= Take Me Back: Live at the Gorge =

Live album by Dave Matthews Band
- Released: February 6, 2026 (digital); May 22, 2026 (physical)
- Venue: The Gorge Amphitheatre (Grant County)
- Labels: Bama Rags; ATO

Dave Matthews Band chronology
Where Are You Going: The Singles (2025)	Take Me Back: Live at the Gorge (2026)

Take Me Back: Live at the Gorge is a live album by American group Dave Matthews Band, recorded during a performance at The Gorge Amphitheatre on August 30, 2025. It was released digitally on February 6, 2026, while a physical release is scheduled for May 22, 2026. The concert, which included a full performance of the band's album Before These Crowded Streets (1998), featured guest musicians including Béla Fleck, Joe Lawlor, and Jake Simpson.

== Track listing ==
Disc one

1. "All Along the Watchtower" (Bob Dylan) – 9:33
2. "You Never Know" (Carter Beauford, Stefan Lessard, Dave Matthews, LeRoi Moore, Boyd Tinsley) – 8:48
3. "Cornbread" (Matthews, Mark Batson) – 10:06
4. "It Could Happen" (Beauford, Lessard, Matthews, Tim Reynolds, Rashawn Ross, Arthur "Buddy" Strong) – 5:21
5. "#41" (Beauford, Lessard, Matthews, Moore, Tinsley) – 16:56
6. "Pantala Naga Pampa" (Matthews) » "Rapunzel" (Beauford, Lessard, Matthews) – 7:35
7. "The Last Stop" (Lessard, Matthews) – 11:33

Disc two

1. "Don't Drink the Water" (Matthews) – 7:29
2. "Stay (Wasting Time)" (Lessard, Matthews, Moore) – 6:01
3. "Halloween" (Matthews) – 5:56
4. "The Stone" (Matthews) – 12:14
5. "Crush" (Matthews) – 18:13
6. "The Dreaming Tree" (Lessard, Matthews) – 11:26

Disc three

1. "Pig" (Beauford, Lessard, Matthews, Moore, Tinsley) – 7:23
2. "Spoon" (Matthews) – 6:07
3. "Satellite" (Matthews) – 5:32
4. "Tripping Billies" (Matthews) – 9:17
5. "Rye Whiskey" (traditional) – 3:30
6. "What Would You Say" (Matthews) – 4:47
