= Dave Matthews Band discography =

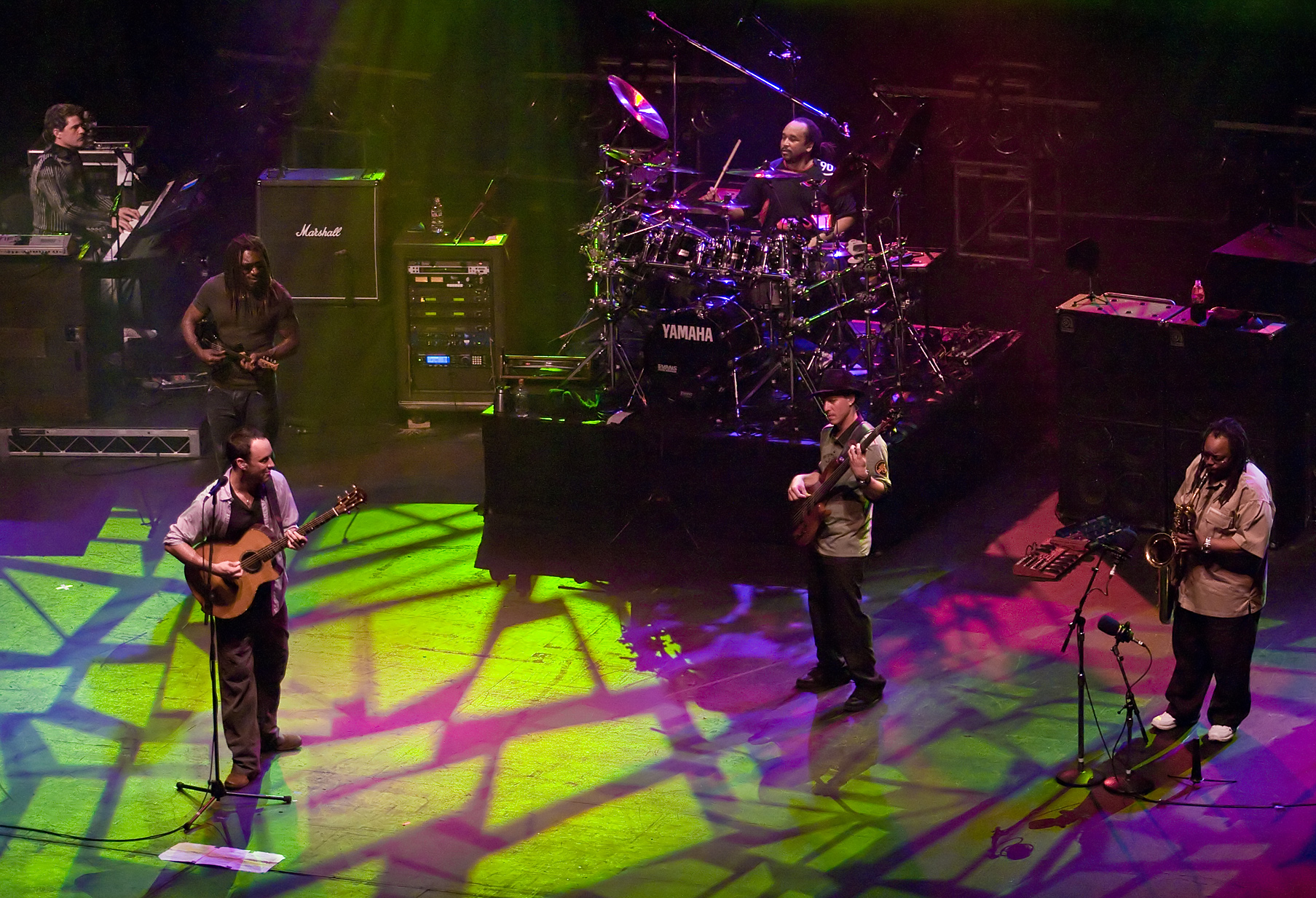
- Dave Matthews Band, 2005
- Studio albums: 10
- Extended plays: 2
- Live albums: 85
- Compilation albums: 3
- Singles: 36
- Video albums: 8
- Music videos: 2

The American rock band Dave Matthews Band has released 10 studio albums, 85 live albums, three compilation albums, eight video albums, two extended plays, 36 singles (including one as a featured artist), and 21 music videos. DMB has sold over 30 million albums in the United States.

After signing with RCA Records, Dave Matthews Band released its debut studio album, Under the Table and Dreaming (1994). In the United States, the album peaked at number 11 on the Billboard 200 and was certified six times platinum by the Recording Industry Association of America (RIAA). The group's next studio album, Crash (1996), peaked at number two on the Billboard 200 and was certified seven times platinum by the RIAA. Before These Crowded Streets (1998) reached number one on the Billboard 200 and was certified four times platinum by the RIAA; the band's single "Crush", which became the band's first entry on the US Billboard Hot 100, appeared on that album. Before These Crowded Streets was followed by Everyday (2001) (which debuted at number one on the Billboard 200, was certified three times platinum by the RIAA, and featured the band's first top 40 hit, "The Space Between"), Busted Stuff (2002) (which reached number one on the Billboard 200, was certified two times platinum by the RIAA and included another Top 40 hit, "Where Are You Going"), Stand Up (which reached number one, was certified platinum, and contained the band's most successful single to date, "American Baby"), Big Whiskey and the GrooGrux King (which debuted at number one and was certified platinum by the RIAA), Away from the World (2012), and Come Tomorrow (2018).

The group has released multiple live albums throughout its career. While always encouraging fan recordings of concerts for personal enjoyment, the success of the band led to the illegal sale of such recordings. Such copies were often very expensive and of low quality. To meet the demand of the illegal distribution of such recordings, the band released its first concert album, Live at Red Rocks 8.15.95, in October 1997. As of August 2021, the band has released a total of 96 live albums, including 56 from the Live Trax series and 23 from the DMBlive series.

== Albums ==
=== Studio albums ===
List of albums, with selected chart positions and certifications
Title	Album details	Peak chart positions										Certifications
Title	Album details	US	AUS	CAN	DEN	GER	NLD	NZ	POR	SWE	UK	Certifications
Under the Table and Dreaming	Released: September 27, 1994; Label: RCA; Formats: CD, CS, LP, download	11	—	—	—	—	—	—	—	—	—	RIAA: 6× Platinum; MC: Gold
Crash	Released: April 30, 1996; Label: RCA; Formats: CD, CS, LP, download	2	—	25	—	—	—	37	—	—	—	RIAA: 7× Platinum; MC: Platinum
Before These Crowded Streets	Released: April 28, 1998; Label: RCA; Formats: CD, CS, LP, download	1	66	6	—	—	—	29	—	44	168	RIAA: 4× Platinum; MC: Platinum
Everyday	Released: February 27, 2001; Label: RCA; Formats: CD, download	1	71	1	31	97	—	30	—	58	89	RIAA: 3× Platinum; BPI: Silver; MC: Platinum
Busted Stuff	Released: July 16, 2002; Label: RCA; Formats: CD, download	1	—	1	—	—	—	—	—	—	—	RIAA: 2× Platinum
Stand Up	Released: May 10, 2005; Label: RCA; Formats: CD, download	1	16	3	—	—	—	35	—	—	—	RIAA: Platinum
Big Whiskey & the GrooGrux King	Released: June 2, 2009; Label: RCA; Formats: CD, LP, download	1	64	2	—	74	99	—	24	—	59	RIAA: Platinum; MC: Gold
Away from the World	Released: September 11, 2012; Label: RCA; Formats: CD, LP, download	1	—	3	—	—	90	—	—	—	—	RIAA: Gold
Come Tomorrow	Released: June 8, 2018; Label: RCA; Formats: CD, CS, LP, download	1	—	2	—	—	—	—	—	—	—	
Walk Around the Moon	Released: May 19, 2023; Label: RCA; Formats: CD, CS, LP, download	5	—	—	—	—	—	—	—	—	—	
"—" denotes releases that did not chart or were not released in that territory.

=== Live albums ===
List of albums, with selected chart positions and certifications
Title	Album details	Peak chart positions	Certifications
Title	Album details	US	Certifications
Remember Two Things	Released: November 9, 1993; Label: Bama Rags; Formats: CD, vinyl (LP), CS	49	RIAA: Platinum
Live at Red Rocks 8.15.95	Released: October 28, 1997; Label: RCA; Formats: CD, vinyl	3	RIAA: 2× Platinum
Listener Supported	Released: November 23, 1999; Label: RCA; Formats: CD	15	RIAA: 2× Platinum
Live in Chicago 12.19.98 at the United Center	Released: October 23, 2001; Label: RCA; Formats: CD	6	RIAA: Platinum
Live at Folsom Field, Boulder, Colorado	Released: November 5, 2002; Label: RCA; Formats: CD	9	RIAA: Platinum
The Central Park Concert	Released: November 18, 2003; Label: RCA; Formats: CD	14	RIAA: Platinum
The Gorge	Released: June 29, 2004; Label: RCA; Formats: CD	10	RIAA: Gold
Weekend on the Rocks	Released: November 29, 2005; Label: RCA; Formats: CD	37	
Live at Piedmont Park	Released: December 11, 2007; Label: RCA; Formats: CD, download	68	
Live at Mile High Music Festival	Released: December 16, 2008; Label: RCA; Formats: CD, download	97	
Europe 2009	Released: December 22, 2009; Label: RCA; Formats: CD, download	120	
Live in New York City	Released: November 9, 2010; Label: RCA; Formats: CD, download	36	
Live at Wrigley Field	Released: May 31, 2011; Label: RCA; Formats: CD, download	49	
Live on Lakeside	Released: November 16, 2011; Label: RCA; Formats: Download	—	
Live in Atlantic City	Released: December 16, 2011; Label: RCA; Formats: CD	—	
Warehouse Warm-Up 2019	Released: June 5, 2019; Label: RCA; Formats: Download		
Live at the Hollywood Bowl	Released: December 6, 2019; Label: RCA; Formats: CD, Vinyl		
Take Me Back: Live at the Gorge	Released: January 29, 2026		
"—" denotes releases that did not chart or were not released in that territory.

=== DMBLive ===
List of DMBLive albums
Title	Album details
DMBLive Blue Note, Columbia, MO 10/22/1994	Released: December 19, 2008; Label: RCA; Formats: Download
DMBLive Town Point Park, Norfolk, VA 4/26/1994	Released: December 27, 2008; Label: RCA; Formats: Download
DMBLive Irving Plaza, New York, NY 3/26/1994	Released: July 17, 2009; Label: RCA; Formats: Download
DMBLive The Bayou, Washington, DC 4/10/1993	Released: September 16, 2009; Label: RCA; Formats: Download
DMBLive Warfield Theatre, San Francisco, CA 5/10/1995	Released: September 16, 2009; Label: RCA; Formats: Download
DMBLive The Flood Zone, Richmond, VA 01/27/1993	Released: November 30, 2009; Label: RCA; Formats: Download
DMBLive Frank Erwin Center, Austin, TX 10/24/1996	Released: February 25, 2010; Label: RCA; Formats: Download
DMBLive The Bayou, Washington, DC 12/21/1992	Released: June 8, 2010; Label: RCA; Formats: Download
DMBLive Lafayette College, Easton, PA 2/25/1995	Released: September 14, 2010; Label: RCA; Formats: Download
DMBLive Backstage Theatre, Seattle, WA 11/26/94	Released: January 19, 2011; Label: RCA; Formats: Download
DMBLive Oak Mountain Amphitheatre, Pelham, AL 09/09/1996	Released: September 23, 2011; Label: RCA; Formats: Download
DMBLive Mud Island Amphitheatre, Memphis, TN 07/20/1995	Released: September 23, 2011; Label: RCA; Formats: Download
DMBLive Masquerade Nightclub, Tampa, FL 3/2/1994	Released: June 20, 2012; Label: RCA; Formats: Download
DMBLive Cameron Indoor Stadium, Durham, NC 4/7/1995	Released: May 2, 2013; Label: RCA; Formats: Download
DMBLive The Revolver Club, Madrid, Spain 3/25/1995	Released: May 31, 2013; Label: RCA; Formats: Download
DMBLive Palace Theatre, Albany, NY 2/8/1995	Released: August 15, 2013; Label: RCA; Formats: Download
DMBLive Trax Nightclub, Charlottesville, VA 7/28/1992	Released: January 12, 2014; Label: RCA; Formats: Download
DMBLive The Academy, New York, NY 4/5/1995	Released: March 25, 2015; Label: RCA; Formats: Download, Vinyl
DMBLive Georgia Theatre, Athens, GA 10/14/1994	Released: September 3, 2015; Label: RCA; Formats: Download
DMBLive First Union Center, Philadelphia, PA 11/30/1998	Released: December 9, 2015; Label: RCA; Formats: Download, Vinyl
DMBLive Trax, Charlottesville, VA 02/22/1994	Released: March 3, 2016; Label: RCA; Formats: Download, Vinyl
DMBLive Georgia Theatre, Athens, GA 04/06/1994	Released: October 17, 2016; Label: RCA; Formats: Download
DMBLive Madison Square Garden, New York, NY 10/03/1996	Released: December 16, 2016; Label: RCA; Formats: Download
DMBLive Des Eurockeennes, Lac de Malsaucy, France 07/09/1995	Released: February 8, 2017; Label: RCA; Formats: Download

=== Compilation albums ===
List of albums, with selected chart positions and certifications
Title	Album details	Peak chart positions		Certifications
Title	Album details	US	CAN	Certifications
The Best of What's Around Vol. 1	Released: November 7, 2006; Label: RCA; Formats: CD, LP, download	10	42	RIAA: Gold
Live Trax	Released: July 31, 2007; Label: RCA; Formats: CD	—	—	
Live Trax 2008	Released: October 28, 2008; Label: Bama Rags; Format: download (iTunes exclusive)	—	—	
DMB Live 25	Released: July 28, 2017; Label: Bama Rags; Format: Vinyl, download	—	—	
Rhino's Choice	Released: June 14, 2019; Label: RCA; Format: Vinyl, CD, download	158	—	
Where Are You Going: The Singles	Released: February 7, 2025; Label: RCA; Format: Vinyl, CD, download	—	—	
"—" denotes releases that did not chart or were not released in that territory.

=== Ticket Purchase Releases ===
List of ticket purchase releases
Title	Album details
2018-12-14 Charlottesville, VA	Released April 11, 2019; Free download with any ticket purchase for the 2019 Summer Tour; Label: RCA; Format: Download

=== Video albums ===
List of video albums
Title	Album details
Listener Supported	Released: November 23, 1999; Label: RCA; Formats: VHS, DVD
The Videos 1994–2001	Released: August 21, 2001; Label: RCA; Formats: VHS, DVD
Live at Folsom Field, Boulder, Colorado	Released: November 5, 2002; Label: RCA; Formats: DVD
The Central Park Concert	Released: November 18, 2003; Label: RCA; Formats: DVD
The Gorge	Released: June 29, 2004; Label: RCA; Formats: DVD
Weekend on the Rocks	Released: November 29, 2005; Label: RCA; Formats: DVD
Live at Piedmont Park	Released: December 11, 2007; Label: RCA; Formats: DVD
Europe 2009 – Across the Pond	Released: December 22, 2009; Label: RCA; Formats: DVD

== Extended plays ==
List of extended plays, with selected chart positions
Title	EP details	Peak chart positions
Title	EP details	US
Recently	Released: May 17, 1994; Label: Bama Rags; Formats: CD, 10" Vinyl	163
The Haiti Relief Project	Released: January 29, 2010; Label: RCA; Formats: Download	—
"—" denotes releases that did not chart or were not released in that territory.

== Singles ==
List of singles, with selected chart positions and certifications, showing year released and album name
Title	Year	Peak chart positions										Certifications	Album
Title	Year	US	US AAA	US Adult	US Alt.	US Main.	US Pop	AUS	CAN	JPN	UK	Certifications	Album
"What Would You Say"	1994	—^{[A]}	—	35	11	5	9	—	—	—	—		Under the Table and Dreaming
"Jimi Thing"	1994	—	—	—	—	—	—	—	—	—	—		Under the Table and Dreaming
"Typical Situation"	1994	—	—	—	—	—	—	—	—	—	—		Under the Table and Dreaming
"Ants Marching"	1995	—^{[B]}	—	22	18	18	19	—	30	—	—		Under the Table and Dreaming
"Satellite"	1995	—^{[C]}	7	—	18	36	34	—	—	—	—		Under the Table and Dreaming
"Too Much"	1996	—	1	—	5	9	—	91	23	—	—		Crash
"So Much to Say"	1996	—^{[E]}	3	38	19	20	31	—	26	—	—		Crash
"Crash into Me"	1996	—^{[F]}	2	9	7	—	18	—	30	—	—		Crash
"Two Step"	1997	—	11	—	—	—	—	—	—	—	—		Crash
"Tripping Billies"	1997	—	6	—	18	—	—	—	76	—	—		Crash
"Don't Drink the Water"	1998	—^{[G]}	1	—	4	19	—	—	21	—	—		Before These Crowded Streets
"Stay (Wasting Time)"	1998	—^{[H]}	1	20	8	35	33	—	31	—	—		Before These Crowded Streets
"Crush"	1998	75	3	20	11	—	38	—	15	—	—		Before These Crowded Streets
"Rapunzel"	1999	—	18	—	—	—	—	—	—	—	—		Before These Crowded Streets
"I Did It"	2001	71	1	20	5	23	—	—	—	—	—		Everyday
"The Space Between"	2001	22	1	4	10	—	18	97	—	—	35		Everyday
"Everyday"	2001	—^{[I]}	1	8	38	—	—	—	—	—	—		Everyday
"Where Are You Going"	2002	39	1	3	20	—	33	—	—	—	—		Busted Stuff
"Grace Is Gone"	2002	—	4	—	—	—	—	—	—	—	—		Busted Stuff
"Grey Street"	2002	—^{[J]}	5	18	33	—	—	—	—	—	—		Busted Stuff
"American Baby"	2005	16	2	8	—	—	—	—	—	—	—	RIAA: Gold	Stand Up
"Dreamgirl"	2005	—	3	—	—	—	—	—	—	—	—		Stand Up
"Everybody Wake Up (Our Finest Hour Arrives)"	2006	—	11	—	—	—	—	—	—	—	—		Stand Up
"Smooth Rider"	2006	—	—	—	—	—	—	—	—	—	—		Stand Up
"Funny the Way It Is"	2009	37	1	21	22	—	—	—	—	—	—		Big Whiskey & the GrooGrux King
"Why I Am"	2009	—	2	—	—	—	—	—	—	—	—		Big Whiskey & the GrooGrux King
"You and Me"	2009	57	2	27	—	—	—	—	53	97	—		Big Whiskey & the GrooGrux King
"Mercy"	2012	95	1	—	—	—	—	—	—	73	—		Away from the World
"If Only"	2012	—	11	—	—	—	—	—	—	—	—		Away from the World
"Samurai Cop (Oh Joy Begin)"	2018	—	5	—	—	—	—	—	—	—	—		Come Tomorrow
"That Girl Is You"	2018	—	—	—	—	—	—	—	—	—	—		Come Tomorrow
"Again and Again"	2018	—	14	—	—	—	—	—	—	—	—		Come Tomorrow
"Come Tomorrow"	2019	—	25	34	—	—	—	—	—	—	—		Come Tomorrow
"Madman's Eyes"	2023	—	4	—	—	—	—	—	—	—	—		Walk Around the Moon
"Monsters"	2023	—	4	—	—	—	—	—	—	—	—		Walk Around the Moon
"Walk Around the Moon"	2023	—	—	—	—	—	—	—	—	—	—		Walk Around the Moon
"Break Free"	2023	—	26	—	—	—	—	—	—	—	—		Walk Around the Moon
"—" denotes releases that did not chart or were not released in that territory.

=== As featured artist ===
List of singles, with selected chart positions, showing year released and album name
Title	Year	Peak chart positions			Album
Title	Year	US AAA	US Sales	UK	Album
"Work It Out" (Jurassic 5 featuring Dave Matthews Band)	2006	30	41	116	Feedback

== Other charted songs ==
List of non-single songs, with selected chart positions, showing year released and album name
Title	Year	Peak chart positions	Album
Title	Year	DEN	Album
"Recently"	1994	19	Recently

== Music videos ==
List of music videos, showing year released and director
Title	Year	Director(s)
"What Would You Say"	1994	David Hogan
"Ants Marching"	1995	David Hogan
"Satellite"	1995	Wayne Isham
"Too Much"	1996	Ken Fox
"So Much to Say"	1996	Ken Fox
"Two Step"	1996	—N/a
"Crash Into Me"	1996	Dean Karr
"Tripping Billies"	1996	Ken Fox
"Don't Drink the Water"	1998	Dean Karr
"Stay (Wasting Time)"	1998	Dean Karr
"Crush"	1998	Dean Karr
"I Did It"	2001	Dave Meyers
"The Space Between"	2001	Dave Meyers
"Everyday"	2001	Chuck McBride
"Where Are You Going"	2002	Digital Kitchen
"Grey Street"	2002	—N/a
"American Baby"	2005	Dave Meyers
"Dreamgirl"	2005	Dave Meyers
"Funny the Way It Is"	2009	George Ratliff
"Why I Am" (live)	2009	Sam Erickson
"You and Me"	2009	Michael Baldwin
"Mercy"	2012	James Frost
"Rooftop"	2013	Aaron Farrington

== Notes ==
- A "What Would You Say" did not enter the Billboard Hot 100, but peaked at #15 on the Bubbling Under Hot 100 Singles chart, which acts as a 25-song extension to the Hot 100. It also peaked at #22 on the Hot 100 Airplay chart.
- B "Ants Marching" did not enter the Billboard Hot 100, but peaked at #21 on the Hot 100 Airplay chart.
- C "Satellite" did not enter the Billboard Hot 100, but peaked at #55 on the Hot 100 Airplay chart.
- D "Too Much" did not enter the Billboard Hot 100, but peaked at #39 on the Hot 100 Airplay chart.
- E "So Much to Say" did not enter the Billboard Hot 100, but peaked at #48 on the Hot 100 Airplay chart.
- F "Crash into Me" did not enter the Billboard Hot 100, but peaked at #19 on the Hot 100 Airplay chart.
- G "Don't Drink the Water" did not enter the Billboard Hot 100, but peaked at #51 on the Hot 100 Airplay chart.
- H "Stay (Wasting Time)" did not enter the Billboard Hot 100, but peaked at #44 on the Hot 100 Airplay chart.
- I "Everyday" did not enter the Billboard Hot 100, but peaked at #1 on the Bubbling Under Hot 100 Singles chart, which acts as a 25-song extension to the Hot 100.
- J "Grey Street" did not enter the Billboard Hot 100, but peaked at #19 on the Bubbling Under Hot 100 Singles chart, which acts as a 25-song extension to the Hot 100.
