= The Best of What's Around Vol. 1 =

Greatest hits album by Dave Matthews Band
- Released: November 7, 2006
- Recorded: 1994–2006
- Genre: Rock
- Length: 127:42
- Label: RCA; Bama Rags
- Producer: John Alagía, Steve Lillywhite, Glen Ballard, Stephen Harris, Mark Batson

Dave Matthews Band chronology
Weekend on the Rocks (2005)	The Best of What's Around Vol. 1 (2006)	Live at Piedmont Park (2007)

The Best of What's Around Vol. 1 is a compilation album by Dave Matthews Band. It was released on November 7, 2006 through RCA Records. It is the second greatest hits album by the band. The first disc consists of tracks from the band's first six studio albums, while the second disc consists of previously unreleased live recordings. The album sold 65,000 copies in its first week, earning the number 10 spot on the Billboard 200. It was certified Gold on February 1, 2007.

== Background ==
In July 2006, an email was sent out to members of the Dave Matthews Band's mailing list, informing fans that a compilation was to be released in September, and they were asked to choose 10 of their favorite live songs (and their specific dates). The 10 most popular live songs were to be featured on the second disc of the compilation; however, only eight tracks are featured on disc two. With the rising popularity of the band's latest live release, Live Trax Vol. 6, the compilation's release date was pushed back to November 7, 2006. Inside the CD case of Live Trax Vol. 6 an advertisement for The Best of What's Around Vol. 1 was featured, incorrectly claiming that "Where Are You Going" was to be among the studio tracks appearing on disc one, and that the album was to be released on November 6, not November 7. Sony BMG Music Entertainment released an advanced billing of the album, also incorrectly claiming that it was to feature a live version of "The Dreaming Tree." A third disc (entitled the "Encore CD") featuring four additional live performances was made available to fans who pre-ordered the album, and later received a wider release for an additional cost.

=== Cover art ===
The album's cover art, designed to look like a concert ticket, features several hidden references:

- 1241998 – reference to December 4, 1998, the date the Warehouse Fan Association began
- Saturday, April 20, 1991 – the date of the band's first ever show, performed at the Earth Day festival in Charlottesville, Virginia
- Section 34, Row 36, Seat 41 – reference to three of the band's "numbered" songs:
  - "#34" (from Under the Table and Dreaming)
  - "#36" (from Live at Red Rocks, Listener Supported, and Live Trax Vol. 12)
  - "#41" (from Crash)
- the barcode printed on the ticket is the UPC code of the album

== Reception ==
Professional ratings
Review scores
Source	Rating
AllMusic	4/5 stars
The Encyclopedia of Popular Music	4/5 stars
PopMatters	8/10
The Rolling Stone Album Guide	3/5 stars
Slant Magazine	3/5 stars

Thom Jurek stated in his review of the album that it is "actually a stellar introduction" to the band, while noting that "Those uninitiated who are wondering what all the fuss has been about for the past decade get a real opportunity here to check out the very best of what's been recorded, and get a small taste of the band live as well."

== Track listing ==
Disc one – studio
No.	Title	Writer(s)	Original release	Length
1.	"The Best of What's Around"	Dave Matthews	Under the Table and Dreaming, 1994	4:16
2.	"What Would You Say"	Matthews	Under the Table and Dreaming	3:42
3.	"Crash into Me"	Matthews	Crash, 1996	5:16
4.	"Too Much"	Matthews; Boyd Tinsley; Stefan Lessard; LeRoi Moore; Carter Beauford	Crash	4:22
5.	"Rapunzel"	Matthews; Lessard; Beauford	Before These Crowded Streets, 1998	6:00
6.	"Crush"	Matthews	Before These Crowded Streets	8:09
7.	"So Right"	Matthews; Glen Ballard	Everyday, 2001	4:40
8.	"The Space Between"	Matthews; Ballard	Everyday	4:03
9.	"Grey Street"	Matthews; Tinsley; Lessard; Moore; Beauford	Busted Stuff, 2002	5:07
10.	"Grace Is Gone"	Matthews; Tinsley; Lessard; Moore; Beauford	Busted Stuff	4:38
11.	"Hunger for the Great Light"	Matthews; Tinsley; Lessard; Moore; Beauford; Mark Batson	Stand Up, 2005	4:21
12.	"American Baby"	Matthews; Tinsley; Lessard; Moore; Beauford; Batson	Stand Up	4:35
Total length:				59:09

Disc two – live
No.	Title	Writer(s)	Recording date and venue	Length
1.	"Don't Drink the Water"	Matthews	July 16, 2005 – Sound Advice Amphitheatre, West Palm Beach, FL	6:31
2.	"Warehouse" (with Rashawn Ross)	Matthews	July 2, 2006 – Alpine Valley Music Theatre, East Troy, WI	10:57
3.	"Say Goodbye"	Matthews	July 5, 2000 – Comerica Park, Detroit, MI	9:26
4.	"Stay (Wasting Time)"	Matthews; Lessard; Moore	July 19, 2003 – Verizon Wireless Amphitheater, Selma, TX	6:23
5.	"Everyday" (with Vusi Mahlasela and Rashawn Ross)	Matthews; Ballard	June 17, 2006 – Saratoga Performing Arts Center, Saratoga Springs, NY	10:27
6.	"Louisiana Bayou" (with Robert Randolph)	Matthews; Tinsley; Lessard; Moore; Beauford; Batson	June 26, 2005 – Nissan Pavilion, Bristow, VA	7:24
7.	"Ants Marching"	Matthews	March 26, 2005 – State Theatre, Sydney, New South Wales, Australia	7:36
8.	"Two Step"	Matthews	June 11, 2001 – Giants Stadium, East Rutherford, NJ	9:50
Total length:				68:34

Encore CD (pre-order bonus disc)
No.	Title	Writer(s)	Recording date and venue	Length
1.	"Minarets"	Matthews	August 31, 1995 – Great Woods, Mansfield, MA	8:29
2.	"#41" (with Béla Fleck and the Flecktones)	Matthews; Tinsley; Lessard; Moore; Beauford	April 20, 2002 – Corel Centre, Ottawa, ON	32:10
3.	"What You Are" (with Rashawn Ross)	Matthews; Ballard	June 16, 2006 – Saratoga Performing Arts Center, Saratoga Springs, NY	9:08
4.	"The Last Stop"	Matthews; Lessard	June 20, 2003 – Darien Lake Performing Arts Center, Darien, NY	10:33
Total length:				60:20

Notes:

- All tracks on disc two and the Encore CD (except "Minarets") feature Butch Taylor.
- "What You Are" and "The Last Stop" are featured as bonus tracks on the iTunes Store release of the album.

== Charts ==
Chart (2006)	Peak position
Canada Albums (Nielsen Soundscan)	42
US Billboard 200	10
US Top Catalog Albums (Billboard)	33
US Top Rock Albums (Billboard)	1

== Certifications ==
Region	Certification	Certified units/sales
United States (RIAA)	Gold	500,000^{^}
^{^} Shipments figures based on certification alone.
