= Live in Chicago 12.19.98 at the United Center =

2001 live album by Dave Matthews Band

Live album by Dave Matthews Band
- Released: October 23, 2001
- Genre: Rock
- Length: 128:50
- Label: RCA
- Producer: John Alagía

Dave Matthews Band chronology
The Videos 1994–2001 (2001)	Live in Chicago 12.19.98 at the United Center (2001)	Busted Stuff (2002)

Professional ratings
Review scores
Source	Rating
AllMusic	3/5 stars
Classic Rock	3/5 stars

Live in Chicago 12.19.98 at the United Center, also known as simply Live in Chicago 12.19.98, is a live album by the Dave Matthews Band, released by RCA on October 23, 2001. It was recorded at the United Center in Chicago, Illinois. It was originally broadcast as a live webcast, with the recording released on CD.

== Track listing ==
All songs by David J. Matthews unless noted.

Disc one

1. "Intro" – 0:45
2. "The Last Stop" – 11:04
3. "Don't Drink the Water" – 6:57
4. "#41" – 10:20
  - with Victor Wooten
5. "#40" » – 0:37
  - solo by Dave Matthews
6. "Lie in Our Graves" – 12:38
7. "What Would You Say" – 5:35
  - with Maceo Parker
8. "Pantala Intro" » – 5:05
9. "Pantala Naga Pampa" » – 0:40
10. "Rapunzel" – 7:21
11. "Stay (Wasting Time)" – 6:53

Disc two

12. "The Maker" (Daniel Lanois) – 9:37
  - with Mitch Rutman and Victor Wooten
13. "Crash into Me" – 5:56
14. "Jimi Thing" – 14:10
15. "So Much to Say" (Matthews, Peter Griesar) » "Anyone Seen the Bridge?" » – 5:41
16. "Too Much" – 5:13
17. "Christmas Song" – 5:52
18. "Watchtower Intro" » – 2:25
  - solo by Stefan Lessard
19. "All Along the Watchtower" (Bob Dylan) – 12:01

== Personnel ==
Dave Matthews Band

- Carter Beauford – percussion, drums
- Stefan Lessard – bass guitar
- Dave Matthews – guitar, vocals
- LeRoi Moore – saxophone, horns
- Boyd Tinsley – violin

Additional musicians

- Maceo Parker – saxophone on "What Would You Say"
- Tim Reynolds – electric guitar
- Mitch Rutman – electric guitar on "The Maker"
- Victor Wooten – bass guitar on "#41" and "The Maker"
