= Live at Piedmont Park =

Live album by Dave Matthews Band
- Released: December 11, 2007
- Recorded: Piedmont Park, Atlanta, Georgia, September 8, 2007
- Genre: Rock
- Length: 154:40
- Label: RCA

Dave Matthews Band chronology
Weekend on the Rocks (2005)	Live at Piedmont Park (2007)	Big Whiskey & the GrooGrux King (2009)

Professional ratings
Review scores
Source	Rating
Rolling Stone	2/5 stars
Allmusic	4/5 stars

Live at Piedmont Park is a live album and video release by the Dave Matthews Band from a 2007 benefit concert in Atlanta. The concert was held at Atlanta's Piedmont Park in front of an audience of over 80,000 people to raise over US $1 million of a US $42.5 million project to expand 53 acres (210,000 m^{2}) of the city's park. Also performing that day were the Allman Brothers Band. The performance featured guest appearances by Warren Haynes on "What Would You Say" and Gregg Allman on "Melissa." The concert featured many old songs such as "Don't Drink the Water" and "Two Step", but also introduced the first released recordings of: "#27", "Cornbread", and "Eh Hee".

The concert was performed the day after band saxophonist Leroi Moore's 46th birthday. Matthews, the band, and the audience serenade Moore with an apparently spontaneous rendition of "Happy Birthday to You" following the performance of "One Sweet World."

The concert is infamous for missing the backup vocals of drummer Carter Beauford throughout the whole show. Although Carter sang all of his parts, they are not heard on the recording or live DVD. Footage shows him singing in his mic, but no audio corresponds in the recording. This is likely due to an error in mixing.

== CD track listing ==
Disc 1:

1. "One Sweet World" (Mildred Hill/Patty Smith Hill/Dave Matthews) – 9:02
2. "Two Step" (Matthews) – 13:28
3. "Cornbread" (Mark Batson/Matthews) – 5:06
4. "Don't Drink the Water" (Matthews) – 12:23
5. "You Might Die Trying" (Batson/Matthews) – 7:12
6. "Grey Street" (Matthews) – 5:57
7. "#27" (Matthews) – 5:42
8. "What Would You Say" (Matthews) feat. Warren Haynes – 8:16
9. "Melissa" (Gregg Allman) feat. Gregg Allman – 6:01

Disc 2:

1. "Louisiana Bayou" (Batson/Matthews) – 8:07
2. "The Dreaming Tree" (Stefan Lessard/Matthews) – 15:28
3. "Eh Hee" (Matthews) – 4:55
4. "So Much to Say" (Peter Griesar/Matthews/Boyd Tinsley) – 5:34
5. "Anyone Seen the Bridge?" (Dave Matthews Band) – 1:59
6. "Too Much" (Dave Matthews Band) – 6:24
7. "#40" (Matthews) – 1:04
8. "Warehouse" (Matthews) – 12:23
9. "Stay (Wasting Time)" (Matthews) – 7:34

Encore CD:

1. "All Along the Watchtower" (Bob Dylan) – 9:52
2. "Ants Marching" (Matthews) – 8:14

== DVD track listing ==
Disc 1:

1. "One Sweet World"
2. "Two Step"
3. "Corn Bread"
4. "Don't Drink the Water"
5. "You Might Die Trying"
6. "Grey Street"
7. "#27"
8. "What Would You Say" feat. Warren Haynes
9. "Melissa" feat. Gregg Allman
10. "Louisiana Bayou"
11. "The Dreaming Tree"
12. "Eh Hee"

Disc 2:

1. "So Much to Say"
2. "Anyone Seen the Bridge?"
3. "Too Much"
4. "#40"
5. "Warehouse"
6. "Stay (Wasting Time)"
7. "All Along the Watchtower" (Bob Dylan)
8. "Ants Marching"
9. Credits

== Personnel ==
Dave Matthews Band

- Dave Matthews - guitars, lead vocals
- Boyd Tinsley - violins, backing vocals
- Leroi Moore - saxophones, backing vocals
- Stefan Lessard - bass
- Carter Beauford - drums, percussion, backing vocals

Guests

- Gregg Allman - acoustic guitar, vocals
- Warren Haynes - electric guitar
- Butch Taylor - keyboards, backing vocals
- Rashawn Ross - trumpet, backing vocals
