= Live Trax (Dave Matthews Band album) =

Live album by Dave Matthews Band
- Released: July 31, 2007
- Recorded: 1995–2007
- Genre: Rock
- Label: RCA

Live Trax series chronology
Vol. 9 (2007)	Live Trax compilation (2007)	Vol. 10 (2007)

Live Trax is a live compilation album of songs from the Dave Matthews Band's Live Trax series. The album was released on July 31, 2007, and is sold exclusively at Starbucks Coffee locations. A total of nine tracks are featured on the compilation—one from each of the nine Live Trax volumes released between November 2004 and June 2007.

== Promotion ==
The album was promoted by both Starbucks and XM Satellite Radio, along with the promotion of XM's new station, Starbucks XM Café. During the first month of the album's release, Starbucks featured in-store sweepstakes for customers who signed up for an XM Radio trial, where they would be entered to win various prizes, including Dave Matthews Band concert tickets, and passes for a meet-and-greet session with Dave Matthews, himself. In addition to the sweepstakes, XM featured special episodes of the Starbucks XM Café radio show The Daily Grind, featuring highlights from the album during the entire week following the album's release.

== Track listing ==
Live Trax
No.	Title	Writer(s)	Source	Length
1.	"Dancing Nancies"	David J. Matthews	Live Trax Vol. 7 (December 31, 1996)	10:05
2.	"When the World Ends"	Matthews; Glen Ballard	Live Trax Vol. 8 (August 7, 2004)	3:48
3.	"Where Are You Going"	Carter Beauford; Stefan Lessard; Matthews; LeRoi Moore; Boyd Tinsley	Live Trax Vol. 2 (September 12, 2004)	3:53
4.	"You Might Die Trying"	Beauford; Lessard; Matthews; Moore; Tinsley; Mark Batson	Live Trax Vol. 9 (March 24, 2007)	6:17
5.	"#41"	Beauford; Lessard; Matthews; Moore; Tinsley	Live Trax Vol. 4 (April 30, 1996)	7:55
6.	"Don't Drink the Water"	Matthews	Live Trax Vol. 6 (July 8, 2006)	6:33
7.	"Grace is Gone"	Beauford; Lessard; Matthews; Moore; Tinsley	Live Trax Vol. 3 (August 27, 2000)	5:01
8.	"Pantala Naga Pampa" » "Rapunzel"	Beauford; Matthews; Lessard	Live Trax Vol. 1 (December 8, 1998)	7:40
9.	"Tripping Billies"	Matthews	Live Trax Vol. 5 (August 23, 1995)	4:53
