= The Videos 1994–2001 =

Video by Dave Matthews Band
- Released: August 21, 2001
- Recorded: 1994–2001
- Genre: Rock; jazz fusion; folk rock; soft rock
- Label: RCA
- Director: David Hogan, Wayne Isham, Ken Fox, Dean Karr, Dave Meyers
- Producer: Douglas Biro

Dave Matthews Band chronology
Everyday (2001)	The Videos 1994–2001 (2001)	Live in Chicago 12.19.98 at the United Center (2001)

Professional ratings
Review scores
Source	Rating
Allmusic	4/5 stars

The Videos 1994–2001 is a music video compilation by the Dave Matthews Band, released on August 21, 2001 on VHS and DVD. The compilation features all of the band's 12 music videos from their first four albums, from "What Would You Say" to "The Space Between", with the earliest released in 1995, contrary to the compilation's title. Each video features a Dolby Digital stereo and 5.1 surround sound mix, as well as an audio commentary by the video's director. The compilation also features a behind-the-scenes documentary for "Don't Drink the Water", "Stay (Wasting Time)", and "I Did It".

== Track listing ==
No.	Title	Director	Length
1.	"What Would You Say"	David Hogan	4:05
2.	"Ants Marching"	David Hogan	4:28
3.	"Satellite"	Wayne Isham	4:19
4.	"Too Much"	Ken Fox	3:49
5.	"So Much to Say"	Ken Fox	3:08
6.	"Crash into Me"	Dean Karr	4:12
7.	"Tripping Billies"	Ken Fox	4:08
8.	"Don't Drink the Water"	Dean Karr	4:35
9.	"Stay (Wasting Time)"	Dean Karr	3:58
10.	"Crush"	Dean Karr	4:27
11.	"I Did It"	Dave Meyers	3:38
12.	"The Space Between"	Dave Meyers	3:38
