= Listener Supported =

Live album by Dave Matthews Band
- Released: November 23, 1999
- Recorded: September 11, 1999
- Venue: Continental Airlines Arena (East Rutherford, New Jersey)
- Genre: Rock
- Length: 128:37
- Label: BMG
- Producer: John Alagia

Dave Matthews Band chronology
Before These Crowded Streets (1998)	Listener Supported (1999)	Everyday (2001)

Professional ratings
Review scores
Source	Rating
Allmusic	2.5/5 stars
The Music Box	3.5/5 stars
Rolling Stone	3.5/5 stars

Listener Supported is an album by the Dave Matthews Band, released on November 23, 1999. It was recorded live at Continental Airlines Arena in East Rutherford, New Jersey on September 11, 1999.

In addition to being the third live release by Dave Matthews Band, Listener Supported was filmed by PBS for an In the Spotlight special, and the entire concert was released on VHS the same day and DVD on February 8, 2000. The title of this release is taken from PBS's "supported by viewers like you" underwriting spot. It is currently the only Dave Matthews Band live album to not contain the date or location in the title. This is because part of the broadcast agreement allowed PBS to release their own audio CD version of the television special.

Listener Supported was also the first live release to feature keyboardist Butch Taylor and "The Lovely Ladies" on vocals. In addition to songs from each of their RCA studio albums, Listener Supported features the previously unreleased songs "#40", "True Reflections" (sung by Boyd Tinsley), and the heartbeat intro to "Pantala Naga Pampa", as well as the full band versions of "#36", "Granny" and "Long Black Veil".

== Track listing ==
Disc one

1. "Intro" (David J. Matthews) – 6:25
2. "Pantala Naga Pampa" (Matthews) – 0:41
3. "Rapunzel" (Carter Beauford, Stefan Lessard, Matthews) – 7:09
4. "Rhyme & Reason" (Matthews) – 5:58
5. "The Stone" (Matthews) – 7:28
6. "#41" (Beauford, Lessard, Matthews, LeRoi Moore, Boyd Tinsley) – 9:47
7. "Crash into Me" (Matthews) – 6:02
  - contains an interpolation from the composition "Dixie Chicken" (Lowell George, Martin Kibbee)
8. "Jimi Thing" (Matthews) – 13:12
9. "#36" (Matthews) – 7:34
  - with The Lovely Ladies
10. "Warehouse" (Matthews) – 8:32

Disc two

1. "Too Much" (Matthews, Beauford, Moore, Lessard, Tinsley) – 4:52
2. "True Reflections" (Tinsley) – 7:25
  - with The Lovely Ladies
3. "Two Step" (Matthews) – 14:38
4. "Granny" (Matthews) – 4:24
5. "Stay (Wasting Time)" (Matthews, Lessard, Moore) – 7:07
  - with The Lovely Ladies
6. "#40" (Matthews) – 1:49
  - solo by Dave Matthews
7. "Long Black Veil" (Danny Dill, Marijohn Wilkin) – 8:44
  - with The Lovely Ladies
8. "Don't Drink the Water" (Matthews) – 7:09
9. "Intro to..." (Matthews) – 1:36
10. "All Along the Watchtower" (Bob Dylan) – 7:51

== Personnel ==
Dave Matthews Band

- Carter Beauford – percussion, drums, vocals
- Stefan Lessard – bass guitar
- Dave Matthews – guitar, vocals
- LeRoi Moore – saxophone, horns
- Boyd Tinsley – violin, lead vocals on "True Reflections"

Additional musicians

- The Lovely Ladies – backing vocals
  - Tawatha Agee
  - Chinah Bess
  - Brenda White King
- Butch Taylor – keyboards

== Charts ==
=== Weekly charts ===
Chart (1999)	Peak position
US Billboard 200	15

=== Year-end charts ===
Chart (2000)	Position
US Billboard 200	111

== Certifications ==
Region	Certification	Certified units/sales
United States (RIAA)	2× Platinum	2,000,000^{^}
^{^} Shipments figures based on certification alone.
