= Live at Wrigley Field =

Live album by Dave Matthews Band
- Released: May 31, 2011
- Recorded: September 18, 2010
- Venue: Wrigley Field (Chicago, Illinois)
- Genre: Rock
- Label: RCA

Dave Matthews Band chronology
Live in New York City (2010)	Live at Wrigley Field (2011)

Professional ratings
Review scores
Source	Rating
Allmusic	3.5/5 stars

Live at Wrigley Field is a live album by Dave Matthews Band recorded on September 18, 2010, at Wrigley Field in Chicago. The album was recorded on the second night of a two night stint at the venue. Most notably, this performance was the last on the band's 2010 Summer tour, and 2011 touring hiatus. It is also their final official live album to date. The album reached number 49 in the Billboard 200 chart.

Discs 1-4 were released as a part of the Live at Wrigley Field Double Play box set on May 31, 2011.

== CD track listing ==
Disc 1 (9/17/10):

1. "One Sweet World"
2. "Pantala Naga Pampa » Rapunzel"
3. "Funny the Way It Is"
4. "Lying in the Hands of God"
5. "Crush"
6. "Burning Down the House"
7. "Proudest Monkey »"
8. "Satellite"
9. "Shake Me Like a Monkey"
10. "Write a Song"

Disc 2 (9/17/10):

1. "Dancing Nancies"
2. "Why I Am"
3. "You & Me"
4. "Sister"
5. "Don't Drink the Water »"
6. "Everyday »"
7. "Ants Marching"
8. "The Needle and the Damage Done"
9. "All Along the Watchtower"

Disc 3 (9/18/10):

1. "You Might Die Trying"
2. "Stay Or Leave"
3. "Seven"
4. "Crash into Me"
5. "Good Good Time"
6. "#41
7. "Tripping Billies"
8. "Digging A Ditch"
9. "Squirm"
10. "Gravedigger
11. "Spaceman"
12. "Stay (Wasting Time)"

Disc 4 (9/18/10):

1. "Can't Stop"
2. "Grey Street"
3. "Jimi Thing"
4. "Time Bomb"
5. "Two Step"
6. "Christmas Song"
7. "Cornbread"
8. "The Last Stop"

== Personnel ==
Dave Matthews Band

- Dave Matthews - guitars, lead vocals
- Boyd Tinsley - violins, backing vocals
- Stefan Lessard - bass
- Carter Beauford - drums, percussion, backing vocals
- Jeff Coffin - saxophones
- Tim Reynolds - electric guitars
- Rashawn Ross - trumpet, backing vocals
