= Butch Taylor =

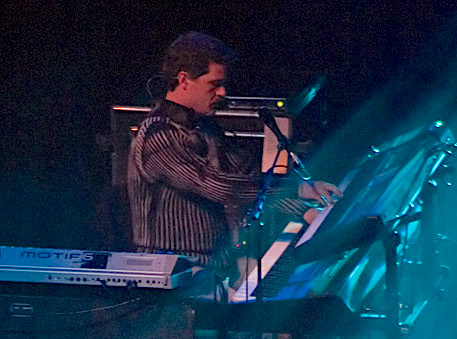
- Taylor in 2005, performing with Dave Matthews Band

Background information
- Also known as: "Mr. Chops"
- Born: Clarence Francis Taylor; April 13, 1961 (age 65); Shawsville, Virginia, United States
- Genres: Rock, jazz
- Occupations: Musician, composer, writer
- Instruments: Keyboards, guitars

Butch Taylor (born Clarence Francis Taylor on April 13, 1961) is a composer, writer, keyboardist and long time guest musician with Dave Matthews Band.

== Early life ==
Butch Taylor was born in Shawsville, Virginia on April 13, 1961. Taylor attended James Madison University where he played trumpet in the JMU Jazz Ensemble. It was there he met future Dave Matthews Band saxophonist, LeRoi Moore. He studied for a bachelor's degree in English and a master's degree in music.

Taylor later played in Richmond, Virginia-based jazz fusion band Secrets with drummer Carter Beauford, saxophonist LeRoi Moore, trumpeter John D'earth, vocalist Dawn Thompson, bassist Keith Horne, keyboardist Dane Bryant, saxophonist Eddie Williams and virtuoso guitarist Tim Reynolds.

== Dave Matthews Band ==
Although not a formal member of the band, he acted as a permanent member of the group from 1998 until 2008, making contributions on both studio and live albums. Taylor played on the band's studio albums Before These Crowded Streets (1998) and Stand Up (2005). His first time guesting with the band live was on June 5, 1998 at Foxborough Stadium in Foxborough, Massachusetts and he would continue guesting sporadically for the next few tours. From May 18, 2001 to April 1, 2008 Taylor played every Dave Matthews Band show. He played a total of 488 concerts with the group until announcing his departure from touring on May 27, 2008. The band's official fan club, the Warehouse Fan Association, released this message:

Keyboardist Butch Taylor has decided to leave Dave Matthews Band. We are saddened by this sudden news but he has our full support. He’s given so much to us and our audience through the years and he will be missed.

Taylor joined the band on September 24, 2017 for the Concert for Charlottesville, the band's home town, at Scott Stadium, a benefit concert to raise funds for the victims killed and injured during the Unite the Right rally held from August 11–12, 2017. The band labeled the event as "An Evening of Music and Unity." This marked the first time Taylor guested with the band since April 1, 2008. The set also featured Stevie Wonder on vocals.

In 2018, Taylor joined the band once again in the studio to record 3 songs for their ninth album Come Tomorrow.

== Current work ==
Between 2009 and 2015, Taylor played on studio albums for Richmond, Virginia indie rock band Carbon Leaf. In 2012 Taylor started Robert Jospé Express with Charlottesville jazz drummer Robert Jospé.

Taylor is the pianist for the Free Bridge Quintet, the faculty jazz quintet at the University of Virginia. He also serves as a professor of jazz piano at the university.

Taylor currently lives in Scottsville, VA. He is divorced and has three adult sons. He is currently the Chief Engineer/Producer/Composer at Ravensworth Studios also in Scottsville.

== Discography ==
=== With Dave Matthews Band ===
==== Studio ====
- Before These Crowded Streets (1998)
- Stand Up (2005)
- Come Tomorrow (2018)

==== Live ====
- Listener Supported (1999)
- Live at Soldier Field (2000)
- Live at Folsom Field, Boulder, Colorado (2001)
- The Gorge (2002)
- The Central Park Concert (2003)
- Weekend on the Rocks (2005)
- The Best of What's Around Vol. 1 (2006)
- Live at Piedmont Park (2007)

=== with Carbon Leaf ===
- Nothing Rhymes with Woman (2009)
- Love Loss Hope Repeat (2015)

=== With Nikhil Korula ===
- Solo Sessions EP (2013)

=== With Robert Jospé Express ===
- Classics (2014)

=== With Robert Jospé ===
- Just Lookin' (2019)
