= Spoon (Dave Matthews Band song) =

Song by Dave Matthews Band

from the album Before These Crowded Streets
- Released: April 28, 1998
- Studio: The Plant Studios, Sausalito, California; Electric Lady Studios, New York City
- Genre: Rock
- Length: 7:33
- Label: RCA
- Songwriter: David J. Matthews
- Producer: Steve Lillywhite

"Spoon" is a Dave Matthews Band song from the album Before These Crowded Streets. Dave Matthews used Peter Gabriel's song "Passion" as an inspiration for this song.

The song features Alanis Morissette on background vocals and one verse, Tim Reynolds on lead guitar, and Béla Fleck on banjo.
