= The Stone (Dave Matthews Band song) =

Song by Dave Matthews Band

from the album Before These Crowded Streets
- Released: April 28, 1998
- Recorded: The Plant Studios, Sausalito, CA & Electric Lady Studios, New York, NY
- Genre: Progressive rock
- Length: 7:28
- Label: RCA
- Songwriter: David J. Matthews
- Producer: Steve Lillywhite

"The Stone" is a Dave Matthews Band song from the album Before These Crowded Streets. A ballad about mistakes and forgiveness, it features distinct backing by the Kronos Quartet. It contains lush orchestrations which were arranged by trumpeter John D'earth.

== Background ==
The song originally held the working title "Chim Chimeney." The song is written in a 6/8 time signature and features orchestral arrangements by John D'earth, with the Kronos Quartet on strings. A 28-second studio jam in 2/2 is heard at the end of the track that features Béla Fleck.

One interpretation of the song is a theme of Dave Matthews' fear of asking his wife for marriage, as well as the life of Judas Iscariot who betrayed Jesus in his final days.

== Live performance ==
In concert, especially at acoustic shows, Matthews has been known to interpolate Elvis Presley's "Can't Help Falling in Love" towards the end of the song as the crowd sings along. Late saxophonist LeRoi Moore plays the melody of the song on the album version. During live performances of the song, the band plays an outro not featured on the studio version. Toward the end of the song, after it decrescendos, the band suddenly and intensely comes back in with the main riff of the song and finishes that way, as opposed to fading out gradually as on the album itself.

== Live releases ==
- Listener Supported
- Live in Las Vegas (Dave Matthews & Tim Reynolds album)
- Live in New York City (Dave Matthews Band)
- Live in Rio
- Live Trax Vol. 2
- Live Trax Vol. 3
- Live Trax Vol. 8
- Live Trax Vol. 11
- Live Trax Vol. 19
- The Gorge (Special Edition)
- Warehouse 5 Vol. 2
- Weekend on the Rocks

== Covers ==
Phillip Phillips covers this song on "Phillip Phillips: Journey to the Finale"
