= Halloween (Dave Matthews Band song) =

Song by Dave Matthews Band

from the album Before These Crowded Streets
- Released: April 28, 1998
- Recorded: The Plant Studios, Sausalito, CA & Electric Lady Studios, New York, NY
- Genre: Rock
- Length: 5:07 (6:30 on Recently)
- Label: RCA
- Songwriter: David J. Matthews
- Producer: Steve Lillywhite

"Halloween" is a song by Dave Matthews Band from the 1998 album Before These Crowded Streets. The song was originally released as a live track on their Recently EP in 1994. It debuted live on Halloween of 1992 and was originally titled "The Halloween Song." It opened the show, and included Kristen Asbury on vocals. The debut was different from newer versions of Halloween, and it is also the longest version of the song (12:07) to date.

"Halloween" is the only track on Before These Crowded Streets not to have lyrics included in the CD cover.

== Live releases ==
- Recently (original EP release)
- Live at Luther College — Dave Matthews & Tim Reynolds acoustic
- Warehouse 5 Vol. 3
- The Gorge (Special Edition)
- Weekend on the Rocks
- Live Trax Vol. 9
- Live Trax Vol. 15
- Live in Atlantic City
- Live Trax Vol. 35
- "2012 Summer Tour Sampler"
