= Recently =

Recently may refer to:

- Recently (album), by Joan Baez
- Recently (EP), by Dave Matthews Band
