= True Reflections =

Studio album by Boyd Tinsley
- Released: June 17, 2003
- Genre: Rock
- Length: 47:45
- Label: RCA
- Producer: Craig Street; Espen Noreger

True Reflections is a rock album by American musician Boyd Tinsley released in June 2003. Though best known as a violinist with The Dave Matthews Band, the album focuses on his singing. He was the first member of the group to release a solo album.

The album was not well received by critics, who largely ignored it, and sales were modest, only debuting at #97 on the Billboard 200. A retrospective review of True Reflections for AllMusic was a positive 4 stars out of 5, describing the album as "making the best of his dusky, unpretentious voice" with the only shortcoming being the persistently melancholy mood of the songs.

== Track listing ==
1. "It's Alright" – 4:59
2. "Show Me" – 4:28
3. "So Glad" – 3:59
4. "Listen" – 4:13
5. "Cause It's Time" – 3:34
6. "Long Time to Wait" – 5:33
7. "Perfect World" – 2:52
8. "Cinnamon Girl" (Neil Young) – 3:12
9. "Run" – 5:27
10. "What a Time For Love" – 3:54
11. "True Reflections" featuring Dave Matthews – 5:34
