= Recently (EP) =

EP by Dave Matthews Band
- Released: May 17, 1994; November 28, 2014 (vinyl re-issue)
- Recorded: February 21–22, 1994
- Venues: The Birchmere in Alexandria, Virginia; Trax in Charlottesville, Virginia
- Genre: Rock
- Length: 26:37
- Label: Bama Rags
- Producers: John Alagia and Dave Matthews Band

Dave Matthews Band chronology
Remember Two Things (1993)	Recently (1994)	Under the Table and Dreaming (1994)

Professional ratings
Review scores
Source	Rating
AllMusic	4/5 stars

Recently is an EP by the Dave Matthews Band, released in 1994. All songs are live recordings. "Recently" is an edit of the live version found on Remember Two Things, recorded at The Flood Zone in Richmond, VA on August 10, 1993; "Dancing Nancies" and "Warehouse" were recorded at The Birchmere in Alexandria, Virginia on February 21, 1994; "All Along the Watchtower" and "Halloween" were recorded at Trax in Charlottesville, Virginia on February 22, 1994.

In September 2014, it was announced that a 10" Special Edition double vinyl, containing both the initial release as well as the "Pumpkin" Promo EP would be released for Record Store Day on Black Friday.

== Track listing ==
All songs written by Dave Matthews except where noted.

Original EP

1. "Recently" (Edit 2) – 3:53
2. "Dancing Nancies" – 5:54
3. "Warehouse" – 5:10
4. "All Along the Watchtower" (Bob Dylan) – 7:03
5. "Halloween" – 6:30

Tracks 2 and 3 are live acoustic versions performed by Dave Matthews and Tim Reynolds.

Promo EP

1. "Recently" (Radio Edit) – 3:31
2. "Ants Marching" (Radio Edit) – 4:36
3. "Tripping Billies" (Remember Two Things Radio Edit) – 4:45
4. "The Song That Jane Likes" (Radio Edit) – 3:23

The promotional cover of Recently showing a woman standing in the background topless as her elbow covers her breasts, and the man stood farther back towards the left side of the image, with a pumpkin visible in his left hand. The Recently promo with this cover was released before the EP itself and features different tracks, including an alternate edit of the title song. The promotional release, informally referred to as the "Pumpkin Recently," is currently one of the rarest releases in the band's catalog.
