= Pantala Naga Pampa =

Song by Dave Matthews Band

from the album Before These Crowded Streets
- Released: April 28, 1998
- Studio: The Plant Studios, Sausalito, California; Electric Lady Studios, New York City
- Genre: Rock
- Length: 0:41
- Label: RCA
- Songwriter(s): David J. Matthews
- Producer(s): Steve Lillywhite

"Pantala Naga Pampa" is the first track on the Dave Matthews Band's album, Before These Crowded Streets.

The song was the shortest track recorded by the band in the studio (until "bkdkdkdd" was released on the 2018 album Come Tomorrow) and was based on an old live song known as "What Will Become of Me?" part of which can be heard at the end of "Jimi Thing" on Matthews and Tim Reynolds' album, Live at Luther College.

When performed live, the song regularly segues into "Rapunzel," just as it does on the studio recording. This can be heard on Listener Supported. In 2024, the band started experimenting by playing the song into songs other than Rapunzel, while playing Rapunzel standalone later in the set.

A band representative told a band fan site in 2002 that the phrase "pantala naga pampa" is believed by the band to mean "I have a snake in my pants" in colloquial Tamil. They learned the phrase from their cook, who was fond of using the phrase.

In a tweet in 2019, bassist Stefan Lessard all but confirmed the meaning of the phrase in reference to a news story of a man stealing a snake by hiding it in his pants.
