= Dreaming Tree Wines =

Dreaming Tree Wines is a line of wines created by the collaboration of award-winning Sonoma County winemaker Sean McKenzie and South African-American musician Dave Matthews in Geyserville, CA. The company was named after The Dreaming Tree, a track from the Dave Matthews Band's "Before These Crowded Streets" 1998 album.

Available nationwide and released in 2011, Dreaming Tree Wines contains a 2010 Central Coast Chardonnay, a 2009 North Coast Cabernet Sauvignon, and a 2012 North Coast Crush, a red blend wine.

== Environmental Concern ==
Dreaming Tree uses wine bottles that weigh 50% less than average, with sustainably grown cork, and recycled paper for the labels.
