= Pig (song) =

Song by Dave Matthews Band

from the album Before These Crowded Streets
- Released: April 28, 1998
- Recorded: The Plant Studios, Sausalito, CA & Electric Lady Studios, New York, NY
- Genre: Progressive rock
- Length: 6:57
- Label: RCA
- Songwriters: Matthews, Lessard, Beauford, Moore, Boyd Tinsley
- Producer: Steve Lillywhite

"Pig" is a Dave Matthews Band song from the album Before These Crowded Streets. The song evolved from an earlier tune entitled "Don't Burn the Pig", which was written about a television program Dave Matthews viewed in England where pigs were burned to test their reaction to pain. After 11 live performances between 1996 and 1998, "Don't Burn the Pig" was recorded in the studio during the Before These Crowded Streets sessions, and then the song reworked itself into "Pig", with the same notion in mind; however, it interpreted more of a carpe diem theme.

A 33-second studio jam is heard at the end of the studio track, based on "Deed Is Done", an early song by the band, and "Anyone Seen the Bridge?", a segue jam that debuted live in 1996.

Dave Matthews Band has performed "Pig" since 1998, up through the summer of 1999. The song did not return to live set lists until spring 2002, where it was played the most during that year than any other year. Since the song's debut, "Pig" has been played 227 times; however, it still remains a rarity among the band's set lists.

== Live releases ==
- The Gorge
- Weekend on the Rocks
- Live Trax Vol. 6
- Live Trax Vol. 26
