= Before These Crowded Streets =

Studio album by Dave Matthews Band
- Released: April 28, 1998
- Recorded: 1997–1998
- Studios: Record Plant (Sausalito); Electric Lady (New York)
- Genres: Alternative rock; jazz fusion; progressive rock
- Length: 70:14
- Label: RCA
- Producer: Steve Lillywhite

Dave Matthews Band chronology
Live at Red Rocks 8.15.95 (1997)	Before These Crowded Streets (1998)	Listener Supported (1999)

Singles from Before These Crowded Streets
- 1. "Don't Drink the Water" Released: March 28, 1998; 2. "Stay (Wasting Time)" Released: June 28, 1998; 3. "Crush" Released: October 5, 1998

Before These Crowded Streets is the third studio album by the American rock band Dave Matthews Band. It was released on April 28, 1998, through RCA Records. The album was produced by Steve Lillywhite, his last collaboration with the group until 2012's Away from the World. Recording took place at The Plant Recording Studios in Sausalito, California and Electric Lady Studios in New York.

Taking its title from a line in "The Dreaming Tree", the album marked a shift in the band's sound, having darker themes and textures and more complex arrangements. Certain songs see the band apply polyrhythms and Middle-Eastern scales. Numerous guests are featured on the album, including Béla Fleck, Alanis Morissette and the Kronos Quartet. Additionally, guitarist Tim Reynolds guests on every track; he would later join the band as a full-time member. Lyrically, the album tackles both personal and socio-political themes, such as war in "The Last Stop" and the slaughter of Native Americans in "Don't Drink the Water".

Before These Crowded Streets was a critical and commercial success. The album debuted at the top of the Billboard 200, selling 421,000 units in its first week of release and knocking the Titanic soundtrack from the top of the chart after a run of 16 consecutive weeks at number one. Three singles were released from the album—"Don't Drink the Water", "Stay (Wasting Time)", and "Crush"—all of which received varying levels of commercial success.

On August 30, 2025, the band, unannounced, performed the album in its entirety during a show at The Gorge Amphitheatre. The performance was universally praised, and instantly became regarded as one of the band’s best shows of all time. This performance was released as Take Me Back: Live at the Gorge on February 6, 2026. The live album’s cover artwork features the distinctive coffee rings from the original album.

== Background ==
Dave Matthews discussing Before These Crowded Streets in 1998

Several tracks on the album are followed by brief interludes, which include instrumental outtakes, excerpts from jam sessions, and portions of songs that were never developed into full studio recordings.

- A clip in which LeRoi Moore is heard answering his cell phone follows "Rapunzel."
- A clip of flute music follows "Don't Drink the Water."
- A string passage by the Kronos Quartet serves as a segue from "Halloween" to "The Stone."
- An outtake featuring Bela Fleck and Alanis Morissette follows "The Stone."
- A clip of "Doobie Thing," an early DMB instrumental song, follows "The Dreaming Tree."
- A clip of "Anyone Seen the Bridge?", a live show transition song, and a short excerpt of "Deed is Done," an unreleased song from the previous tour, follows "Pig."
- A clip now referred to as "The Last Stop Reprise" follows "Spoon."

=== Excluded songs ===
Songs that were recorded during the sessions, but were not included on the final cut:

- "Help Myself" – Licensed for the Scream 2 soundtrack in lieu of "Halloween", which the band decided was too good to leave off the album.
- "Don't Burn the Pig" – Evolved into "Pig" during the sessions.
- "Get in Line"
- "MacHead"
- "#40 (Always)"

==== MacHead ====
"MacHead" was a song recorded during the album's sessions, but it was never completed, so did not make the album. Producer Steve Lillywhite named the song, claiming it sounded like a cross between the sound of Paul McCartney and Radiohead. The song's existence is only known from an image on the 1999 fan calendar with a list of the working titles of the other songs on this album and from an alleged meeting in which Jake Vigliotti claims to have heard said recording.

"[MacHead] is a song that we were working on for [Before] These Crowded Streets and it's a song that we just never got to completion before we finished the album. Who knows, maybe one of these days we'll finish it and record it again, but we finished the album before we finished the song."

— Boyd Tinsley, May 2006

Some fans familiar with the idea of "MacHead" speculated it had been developed, renamed, and added to the band's catalog. They speculate that "MacHead" developed into "Bartender", which debuted in January 1999 at a Dave Matthews and Tim Reynolds concert just months after the April '98 release of Before These Crowded Streets. In November 2009, Jake Vigliotti claims to have heard 6 different demo takes of "Machead" from an early 1997 recording session for the album, effectively confirming its existence to the fan community.

In a 2010 interview with Cali from CBS Radio, Stefan Lessard was asked to give his thoughts on Machead. He replied that "Machead's this little number that I believe was the last song to possibly make it on Before These Crowded Streets and I think there's a recording I have of it somewhere. So it's just finding a recording of it and listening to it and that's on our homework list." The song finally leaked in July of 2024.

== Reception ==
Professional ratings
Review scores
Source	Rating
AllMusic	3.5/5 stars
The Baltimore Sun	3.5/4 stars
Entertainment Weekly	B−
The Guardian	2/5 stars
Los Angeles Times	3/4 stars
Pitchfork	7.6/10
Rolling Stone	3.5/5 stars
The Rolling Stone Album Guide	4.5/5 stars
Spin	5/10
USA Today	3/4 stars

Before These Crowded Streets received generally positive reviews from critics. Writing for The Baltimore Sun, J. D. Considine stated that with the album, the band had "improved on every level", praising the writing, playing and ambition of the arrangements. Additionally, he praised the band for integrating many guests on the album and for "broadening [their] palette". Mark Weingarten, writing for the Los Angeles Times, highlighted the tracks "Rapunzel" and "The Stone" in particular for their "vertiginous polyrhythms and serpentine riffs that dart around Matthew's clenched vocals, yet always manage to lock into an enjoyable groove."

In a retrospective review for AllMusic, Stephen Thomas Erlewine felt that despite the "songwriting remain[ing] a problem" and finding Matthews' lyrics occasionally "embarrassing", the album's "sonic daring results in the most satisfying album they've yet recorded." Another retrospective review came from Pitchfork's Jason P. Woodbury, who wrote that it "remains DMB's most experimental album, a crossroads in the band's history" and stated that it "explores the uneasy zone between celebratory anthems and grim lamentations".

== Track listing ==
Special guest Tim Reynolds is featured on all tracks.

Before These Crowded Streets track listing
No.	Title	Writer(s)	Guest musician(s)	Length
1.	"Pantala Naga Pampa"	Dave Matthews		0:40
2.	"Rapunzel"	Matthews, Stefan Lessard, Carter Beauford	Butch Taylor	6:00
3.	"The Last Stop"	Matthews, Lessard	Béla Fleck	6:57
4.	"Don't Drink the Water"	Matthews	Alanis Morissette, Béla Fleck	7:01
5.	"Stay (Wasting Time)"	Matthews, Lessard, LeRoi Moore	Tawatha Agee, Cindy Mizelle, Brenda White King	5:35
6.	"Halloween"	Matthews	John D'earth, Kronos Quartet	5:07
7.	"The Stone"	Matthews	John D'earth, Kronos Quartet, Béla Fleck	7:28
8.	"Crush"	Matthews	Butch Taylor	8:09
9.	"The Dreaming Tree"	Matthews, Lessard	Greg Howard	8:48
10.	"Pig"	Matthews, Lessard, Beauford, Moore, Boyd Tinsley		6:57
11.	"Spoon"	Matthews	Alanis Morissette, Béla Fleck	7:33
Total length:				70:14

== Personnel ==
Dave Matthews Band

- Carter Beauford – drums, percussion, backing vocals
- Stefan Lessard – bass guitar
- Dave Matthews – vocals, acoustic guitar
- LeRoi Moore – saxophone, penny whistle, bass clarinet
- Boyd Tinsley – acoustic violin

with special guest:

- Tim Reynolds – electric guitar and mandolin

Additional musicians

- The Lovely Ladies – background vocals (5)
  - Tawatha Agee
  - Cindy Myzell
  - Brenda White-King
- John D'earth – trumpet (6)
- Béla Fleck – banjo (3, 4, 11)
- Greg Howard – Chapman Stick (9)
- Kronos Quartet – strings (6, 7)
  - David Harrington – violin
  - John Sherba – violin
  - Hank Dutt – viola
  - Joan Jeanrenaud – cello
- Alanis Morissette – guest vocals (4, 11)
- Butch Taylor – piano and organ (2, 8)

Technical

- Steve Lillywhite – producer, mixing
- Stephen Harris – engineer
- John Alagía – additional pre-production
- Joel Cortright – assistant engineer
- John Seymour – assistant engineer
- Ted Jensen – mastering
- John D'earth – orchestral arrangements (6, 7)
- Thane Kerner – art direction, design
- Ellen von Unwerth – photography

== Charts ==
=== Weekly charts ===
Weekly chart performance for Before These Crowded Streets
Chart (1998)	Peak position
Australian Albums (ARIA)	66
Canadian Albums (Billboard)	6
New Zealand Albums (RMNZ)	29
Swedish Albums (Sverigetopplistan)	44
US Billboard 200	1

=== Year-end charts ===
Year-end chart performance for Before These Crowded Streets
Chart	Year	Position
US Billboard 200	1998	30
US Billboard 200	1999	77
Canadian Alternative Albums (Nielsen SoundScan)	2002	184

== Certifications ==
Certifications for Before These Crowded Streets
Region	Certification	Certified units/sales
Canada (Music Canada)	Platinum	100,000^{^}
United States (RIAA)	4× Platinum	4,000,000^{‡}
^{^} Shipments figures based on certification alone.^{‡} Sales+streaming figures based on certification alone.
