= Tim Reynolds =

American musician (born 1957)

- Reynolds in Argentina with the Dave Matthews Band, 2008
- Born: December 15, 1957 (age 68); Wiesbaden, West Germany
- Citizenship: United States
- Occupations: Musician; songwriter; multi-instrumentalist
- Musical career
- Genres: Instrumental rock; jazz; jazz fusion; classical music; funk; R&B; Americana; psychedelic rock; rock and roll
- Instruments: Guitar; Mandolin; Banjo; Bass; Violin; Piano; Keyboards; Djembe; Vocals
- Years active: 1991–present
- Labels: T.R. Music; RCA; ATO
- Member of: TR3; Dave Matthews & Tim Reynolds; Dave Matthews Band; Dave Matthews & Friends; Mutants
- Website: timreynolds.com

Tim Reynolds (born December 15, 1957) is an American guitarist and multi-instrumentalist known as both a solo artist and as lead guitarist for the Dave Matthews Band. AllMusic critic MacKenzie Wilson has called Reynolds "an under-rated master".

Reynolds plays the guitar, piano, sitar, drums, violin, bass, keyboards, ethnic percussive instruments, solo djembe, harp, uses drum machines for special effects, and sings, although his performances are primarily instrumental rock music. As well as being the founding member of the band TR3, while he was a regular performer at Miller's, a bar in Charlottesville, Virginia, he befriended and encouraged the bartender, a young Dave Matthews, to form a band of his own, introducing him to local musicians, several of whom make up the Dave Matthews Band. While Reynolds long declined the offer to join as an official member, he recorded and toured as a sideman with the Dave Matthews Band from its inception until late 1998, joining them as a permanent member in June 2008. He often tours with Dave Matthews as an acoustic duo in addition to performing as a member of Dave Matthews & Friends.

== Early years ==
Reynolds was born in Wiesbaden, Germany, where his father, who served in the U.S. Army, was stationed. He says he hails from nowhere, because the family moved so often. His family lived many places, including Germany, a farm in Indiana, an army base in Alaska, Kansas, and Missouri, where he lived longer than any other place until he was old enough to move away as an adult. Both parents were extremely devout Christians and he says he grew up with Christian music all around him. However, his older sister owned some albums from the Beatles, which he says, even as a very young child, he loved instantly, playing air guitar to their music.

Upon reaching adolescence, Reynolds learned guitar and bass guitar, so he could perform in the family's local church choir three times a week, while also beginning to experiment with learning what eventually became second nature: adding riffs infused with rock and roll, funk and soul music by the age of twelve. Upon graduation from high school, he moved away from the Midwest. His talent brought him together with what would be two other founding members of the Dave Matthews Band, Carter Beauford and Butch Taylor in the fusion band Secrets in Richmond, Virginia. Later landing in Charlottesville, Virginia, finding jazz, jazz fusion, and experimental music enthusiasts there, Reynolds found the college town a more welcoming environment for him to branch out musically than any of his previous homes, and added to his experimentation other musical influences to his repertoire, including sixties psychedelic rock, citing some of his early influences as Jimi Hendrix, Carlos Santana and Led Zeppelin.

By the 1990s, he had formed the Tim Reynolds Three, or TR3, and had added other influences, such as Nine Inch Nails, Bob Marley and Marilyn Manson. In addition, he continued to learn to play other instruments, including the sitar, sarod, the mandello, keytar, tubular bells and other "exotic" instruments that were not commonly seen in Western rock music of the time.

== Musical collaborations ==
=== As a duo with Dave Matthews ===
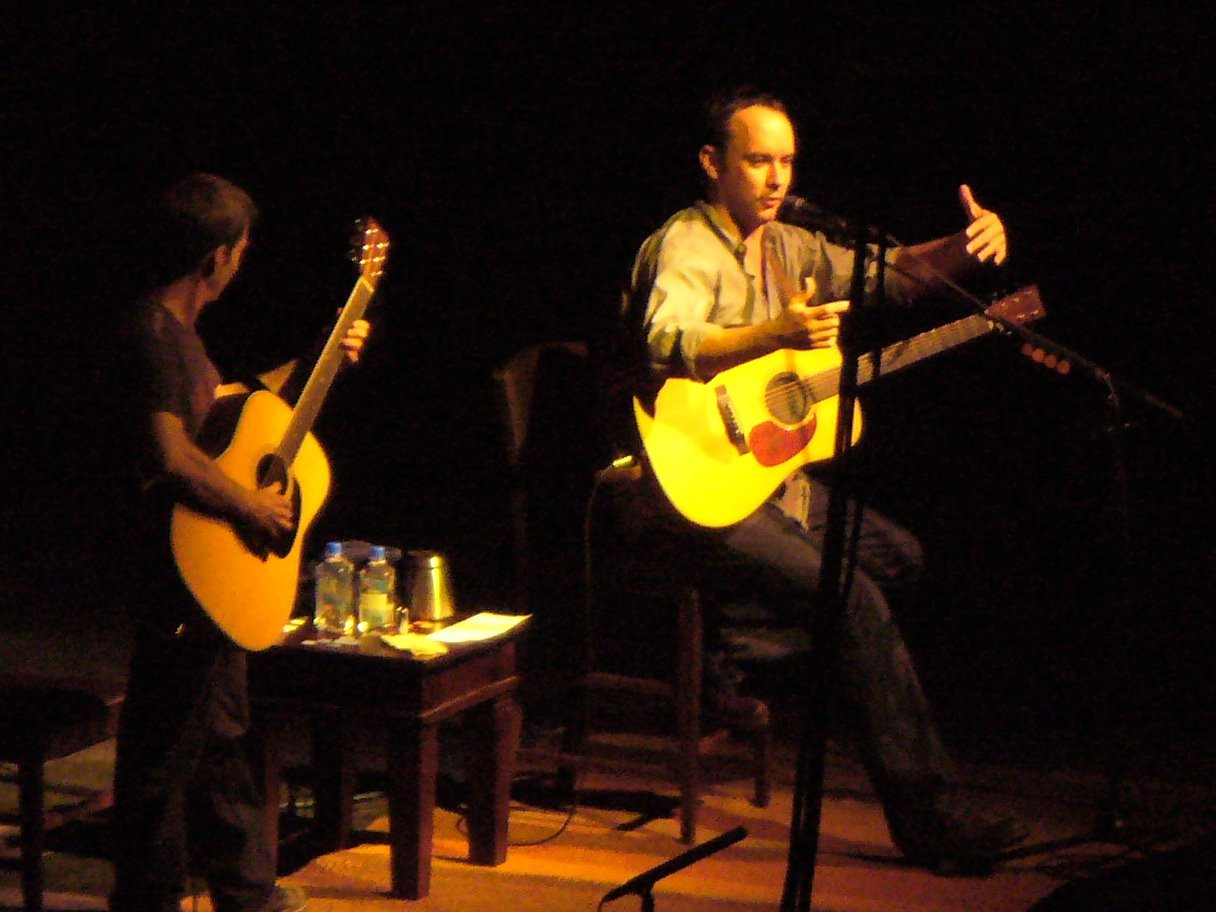
Reynolds and Matthews, (2010)

Reynolds was performing in Charlottesville in the late 1980s when his friend Nic Cappon encouraged him to perform at a local bar, Miller's, where he met bartender Dave Matthews. Reynolds explains:

I played there [Miller's in Charlottesville] all the time. Dave Matthews was the bartender. I knew the rest of his [future] band way before that. We played together in Charlottesville since I moved there in 1981. I would play with LeRoi Moore and Carter Beauford. Dave moved to town in 1987. When the Dave Matthews Band started (1991), I already had my own band (TR3). I told him (Matthews), "I've got a band and I kind of like the way it is. You should start your band." I could see that he needed to do his own thing.

In 1993, Reynolds and Matthews started playing a few acoustic duo sets. These featured Matthews' music, stripped down to just the acoustic guitar, paired with Reynolds' guitar and occasional use of slide guitar. During these sets, Reynolds would play between one and four of his own pieces that spanned his own catalog of work. After a few years these shows gained popularity, and in 1996 Matthews and Reynolds embarked on their first full tour together as a duo. In 1999, coinciding with the release of the 40-date tour, Live at Luther College was released.

After a short break, Reynolds toured again with Matthews as a duo in 2003. Reynolds and Matthews then reprised their duo shows as an opening act for the Dave Matthews & Friends tour in 2003 and early 2004. They played several shows together in 2006 and 2007. Reynolds joined Matthews on a mini-tour of Europe in February and March 2007. On 14 August 2007, Matthews and Reynolds released a live CD/DVD set, Live at Radio City, including the songs "Stay or Leave", "Gravedigger", "Cornbread", and "Dancing Nancies," among others. It also includes two of Reynolds' own songs: "You are My Sanity" and "Betrayal". The Radio City show was also released in high definition on Blu-ray.

In 2008, Reynolds once again joined Dave Matthews Band for the recording of Big Whiskey and the Groogrux King with producer Rob Cavallo. It was Reynolds's first recording collaboration with Matthews since 2003's Some Devil and his first with the Dave Matthews Band since 1998's Before These Crowded Streets.

Reynolds and Matthews performed together several times in April 2008: in support of Presidential candidate Barack Obama, at the "Seeds of Compassion" show in Seattle and at Jack Johnson's Kokua Festival at the Waikiki Shell on the island of Oahu, in Hawaii.

Reynolds toured as lead guitarist with the Dave Matthews Band in support of Big Whiskey and the GrooGrux King in 2009. As of the summer/fall tour of 2023, he is still a full-time member of the Dave Matthews Band.

=== Dave Matthews and Friends ===
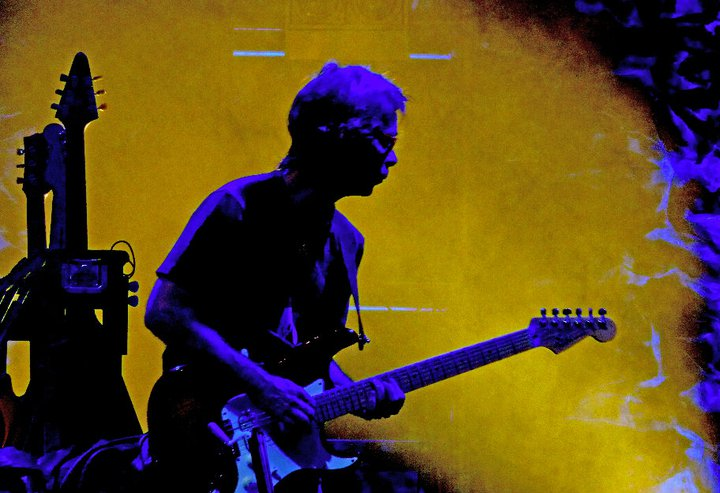
Tim Reynolds playing with the Dave Mathews Band in Chile.

Following the release of Dave Matthews' first solo album, Some Devil, Matthews brought together many of the album's collaborators and embarked on a small winter 2003/2004 U.S. tour. The group consisted of Trey Anastasio (of Phish) on guitar, Brady Blade on drums, Tony Hall on bass, Ray Paczkowski on keys, and Reynolds on guitar. Each show opened with a small acoustic Matthews and Reynolds set, and then followed with the full-band set with Reynolds performing on electric guitar. Most of Some Devil was played live that tour, along with a wide variety of covers, including, by Reynolds' request, Peter Gabriel's hit "Solsbury Hill".

Dave Matthews & Friends performed occasional shows again in 2004, 2005, and 2006. In 2008, Reynolds joined the Dave Matthews Band on their summer North American tour, and scheduled to rejoin them on their Spring 2009 North American tour.

Both Matthews and Reynolds have an open taping policy that additionally extends to TR3.

== Charity ==
Reynolds and Matthews performed on a 2008 album called Songs for Tibet, an initiative to support Tibet and Dalai Lama Tenzin Gyatso and to underline the human rights violations allegedly committed against Tibet by China. On 4 October 2009 Reynolds performed with Matthews in St. Louis, Missouri to support Farm Aid in 2009 and again in Hartford, Connecticut on 22 September 2018.

== Personal life ==
Reynolds has a son Josef, born in February 1982 with his ex-wife, Linna. In 1995, he and then-girlfriend Diane Thomas had a daughter, Eura. They resided in New Mexico with her son Justin Bileyu. In 2008, Thomas moved with their children to North Carolina. Tim followed, to be near his daughter Eura. He currently resides in North Carolina, after living for 17 years in Virginia and several years in New Mexico. On 1 August 2017, Reynolds married Kristin Nienkirchen in Turks and Caicos.

== Discography ==
=== Studio albums ===
- 1993 – Stream
- 1997 – Sanctuary
- 1999 – Astral Projection
- 2000 – See into Your Soul
- 2000 – Stream (re-release)
- 2001 – Nomadic Wavelength
- 2001 – ID – From the Lab (vol one)
- 2002 – Petroglyph
- 2005 – Parallel Universe
- 2010 – The Limbic System
- 2016 – That Way
- 2020 - ‘’Venus Transit’’
- 2021 - ‘’Soul Pilgrimage’’

=== Live albums ===
- 1996 – Gossip of the Neurons
- 2002 – Chaos View

=== As TR3 ===
- 1988 – TR3
- 1991 – Shifting Currents
- 1995 – Light Up Ahead
- 1995 – Dear Charlottesville
- 1995 – Comin' After You
- 2009 – Radiance
- 2011 – Live from SPACE and Beyond
- 2014 – Like Some Kind of Alien Invasion
- 2019 - "The Sea Versus the Mountain"

=== As Dave Matthews and Tim Reynolds ===
- 1999 – Live at Luther College
- 2007 – Live at Radio City
- 2008 – DMBLive – Prism Coffeehouse Charlottesville, VA 4/22/1993
- 2009 – DMBLive – Appalachian State University Boone, NC 3/29/2003
- 2010 – Live in Las Vegas
- 2012 – Live Trax Vol. 23
- 2012 – Live Trax Vol. 24
- 2012 – Live Trax Vol. 41
- 2012 – DMBLive – Memphis, Richmond, VA 6/13/1993
- 2014 – DMBLive – J.T. Kingsbury Hall Salt Lake City, UT 3/3/1999
- 2019 – Live Trax Vol. 48
- 2019 – Live Trax Vol. 49

==== With Dave Matthews Band ====
- 1993 – Remember Two Things
- 1994 – Recently
- 1994 – Under the Table and Dreaming
- 1996 – Crash
- 1997 – Live at Red Rocks 8.15.95
- 1998 – Before These Crowded Streets
- 2001 – Live in Chicago 12.19.98
- 2004 – Live Trax Vol. 1
- 2008 – Live Trax Vol. 13
- 2008 – Live at Mile High Music Festival
- 2008 – Live Trax Vol. 14
- 2009 – Live Trax Vol. 15
- 2009 – Big Whiskey and the GrooGrux King
- 2009 – Europe 2009
- 2010 – Live in New York City
- 2010 – Live Trax Vol. 19
- 2011 – Live at Wrigley Field
- 2011 – Live in Atlantic City
- 2012 – Live Trax Vol. 22
- 2012 – Away from the World
- 2018 – Come Tomorrow
- 2019 – Live at the Hollywood Bowl
- 2023 – Walk Around The Moon

== Awards ==
=== Grammys ===
- 2010: Album of the Year – Big Whiskey and the GrooGrux King (as featured artist) – Nominated
- 2011: Best Rock Instrumental Performance – "Kundalini Bonfire" – Nominated
