= Crush (Dave Matthews Band song) =

1998 single by Dave Matthews Band

Single by Dave Matthews Band

from the album Before These Crowded Streets
- Released: October 5, 1998
- Recorded: Electric Lady (New York City)
- Length: 8:09 (album version); 4:12 (radio edit)
- Label: RCA
- Songwriter: David J. Matthews
- Producer: Steve Lillywhite

Dave Matthews Band singles chronology
"Stay (Wasting Time)" (1998)	"Crush" (1998)	"Rapunzel" (1999)

Music video
- "Crush" on YouTube

"Crush" is a song by American rock band Dave Matthews Band, released as the third single from their third studio album, Before These Crowded Streets (1998). As a single, it reached number three on the US Billboard Triple-A chart and gave the band their first hit on the Billboard Hot 100, peaking at number 75. As the album version is over eight minutes in length, the song time was cut almost in half for radio airplay and the music video.

== Background and composition ==
According to Matthews, he wrote the song in awe of women, as he said of the song in 1998: "I feel that I have worked my whole life to get to the point where I should have a good understanding of women. But I’m still trying, and although I think I’m a little closer, as any guy knows, we still have a long way to go."

The song was almost omitted from Before These Crowded Streets as the band struggled with it in the studio until bassist Stefan Lessard came up with the opening bass line that set the tone of the song for the rest of the band.

== Music video ==
The music video, directed by Dean Karr, is shot in black and white. It takes place in a nightclub, with Dave Matthews sitting at the bar drinking, singing, and smoking, while the rest of the band plays in the background. In the end, Dave gets up to take a guitar from a waiter in the backstage room and gets up to join the rest of the band.

== Track listing ==
1. "Crush" (edit) – 4:12
2. "Crush" – 8:09

== Charts ==
=== Weekly charts ===
Chart (1998–1999)	Peak position
Canada Top Singles (RPM)	15
US Billboard Hot 100	75
US Adult Alternative Airplay (Billboard)	3
US Adult Pop Airplay (Billboard)	20
US Alternative Airplay (Billboard)	11
US Pop Airplay (Billboard)	38

=== Year-end charts ===
Chart (1998)	Position
US Triple-A (Billboard)	48

Chart (1999)	Position
US Adult Top 40 (Billboard)	44
US Modern Rock Tracks (Billboard)	22
US Triple-A (Billboard)	10
