= Two Step (song) =

1996 song by Dave Matthews Band

Promotional single by Dave Matthews Band

from the album Crash
- Released: 1996
- Length: 6:26 (album version); 3:53 (radio edit)
- Label: RCA
- Songwriter: David Matthews
- Producer: Steve Lillywhite

Dave Matthews Band singles chronology
"Crash into Me" (1996)	"Two Step" (1996)	"Tripping Billies" (1997)

"Two Step" is a song by American rock group Dave Matthews Band. It was released as a promotional single from their second album, Crash, and reached number 11 on the US Billboard Triple-A chart in October 1996. The song has appeared on multiple live albums, including Live at Red Rocks 8.15.95, The Best of What's Around Vol. 1, and The Central Park Concert.

== Charts ==
Chart (1997)	Peak position
US Adult Alternative Airplay (Billboard)	11
