= So Much to Say =

1996 single by Dave Matthews Band

Single by Dave Matthews Band

from the album Crash
- Released: August 1996
- Studio: Bearsville (Woodstock, New York)
- Length: 4:07 (album version); 3:05 (radio edit)
- Label: RCA
- Songwriters: Dave Matthews; Boyd Tinsley; Peter M. Griesar
- Producer: Steve Lillywhite

Dave Matthews Band singles chronology
| "Too Much" (1996) | "So Much to Say" (1996) | "Crash into Me" (1996) |

"So Much to Say" is a song by American rock group Dave Matthews Band. It was released in August 1996 as the second single from their second studio album, Crash (1996). The song won the Grammy Award for Best Rock Performance by a Duo or Group with Vocal at the 39th Annual Grammy Awards in 1997. Commercially, "So Much to Say" reached number three on the US Billboard Triple-A chart, ending 1996 as the chart's second-most successful song, and number 26 in Canada.

== Track listings ==
US single

1. "So Much to Say" (album version) – 4:06
2. "So Much to Say" (edit) – 3:05

Australian single

1. "So Much to Say" (edit) – 3:05
2. "So Much to Say" (album version) – 4:06
3. "#41" (Live at Luther College) – 5:30

== Charts ==
=== Weekly charts ===
| Chart (1996) | Peak position |
|---|---|
| Canada Top Singles (RPM) | 26 |
| US Radio Songs (Billboard) | 48 |
| US Adult Alternative Airplay (Billboard) | 3 |
| US Adult Pop Airplay (Billboard) | 38 |
| US Alternative Airplay (Billboard) | 19 |
| US Pop Airplay (Billboard) | 31 |

=== Year-end charts ===
| Chart (1996) | Position |
|---|---|
| US Modern Rock Tracks (Billboard) | 71 |
| US Triple A (Billboard) | 2 |
