= Tripping Billies =

1997 single by Dave Matthews Band

Promotional single by Dave Matthews Band

from the album Crash
- Released: March 1997
- Genre: Rock
- Length: 4:18 (Radio Edit); 5:00 (Album Version)
- Label: RCA
- Songwriter(s): David J. Matthews
- Producer(s): Steve Lillywhite

Dave Matthews Band singles chronology
"Two Step" (1996)	"Tripping Billies" (1997)	"Don't Drink the Water" (1998)

"Tripping Billies" is a song by the Dave Matthews Band, released as the fifth single from the album Crash. It peaked at #18 on the Billboard Modern Rock Tracks chart in June 1997. The original version of the song, which appeared on their independent release Remember Two Things, was featured on the soundtrack of the film White Man's Burden. It is also notable for being the first track that violinist Boyd Tinsley played with the group, as he had been invited to contribute to the demo before eventually becoming a full-time member.

Singer-songwriter Jimmy Buffett performed "Tripping Billies" at concerts on numerous occasions.

== Track listing ==
1. "Tripping Billies" (Edit) — 4:18
2. "Tripping Billies" (Album Version) — 5:00
3. "Tripping Billies" (Live Version) — 5:28

== Charts ==
Chart (1997)	Peak position
U.S. Billboard Modern Rock Tracks	18
Canada RPM Alternative 30	20
