= What Would You Say =

Single by Dave Matthews Band

from the album Under the Table and Dreaming
- B-side: "Recently"
- Released: September 1994
- Recorded: 1994
- Studio: Bearsville (Woodstock, New York)
- Genre: Alternative rock; folk rock; jazz rock
- Length: 3:42 (radio version); 4:07 (album version)
- Label: RCA
- Songwriter: David J. Matthews
- Producer: Steve Lillywhite

Dave Matthews Band singles chronology
"What Would You Say" (1994)	"Jimi Thing" (1994)

"What Would You Say" is a song by American rock group Dave Matthews Band. It was released in September 1994 as the lead single from their debut album, Under the Table and Dreaming (1994). It reached #11 on the US Modern Rock Tracks chart. In June 1995 it peaked at #9 on the Mainstream Top 40 chart. John Popper of Blues Traveler appears as a guest performer, playing the harmonica.

== Track listing ==
1. "What Would You Say" - 3:42
2. "Recently" (Radio Edit) - 3:31

== Charts ==
=== Weekly charts ===
Weekly chart performance for "What Would You Say"
Chart (1994–1995)	Peak position
US Adult Contemporary (Billboard)	30
US Adult Pop Airplay (Billboard)	35
US Alternative Airplay (Billboard)	11
US Bubbling Under Hot 100 (Billboard)	15
US Mainstream Rock Airplay (Billboard)	5
US Pop Airplay (Billboard)	9
US Radio Songs (Billboard)	22
US Cash Box Top 100	46

=== Year-end charts ===
Year-end chart performance for "What Would You Say"
Chart (1995)	Rank
US Hot 100 Singles Airplay (Billboard)	67
US Top Mainstream Rock Tracks (Billboard)	24
US Top 40/Mainstream Top Titles (Billboard)	36
