= Don't Drink the Water (Dave Matthews Band song) =

1998 single by Dave Matthews Band

Single by Dave Matthews Band

from the album Before These Crowded Streets
- Released: April 1, 1998
- Length: 7:03 (album version); 4:35 (radio edit)
- Label: RCA
- Songwriter: David J. Matthews
- Producer: Steve Lillywhite

Dave Matthews Band singles chronology
"Tripping Billies" (1997)	"Don't Drink the Water" (1998)	"Stay (Wasting Time)" (1998)

Music video
- "Don't Drink the Water" on YouTube

"Don't Drink the Water" is a song by American rock band Dave Matthews Band, released as the first single from their album Before These Crowded Streets. RCA Records made the single available for download on April 1, 1998. The song, which features guest vocals from Alanis Morissette and a banjo played by Béla Fleck, addresses the persecution of the Native Americans in the United States.

"Don't Drink the Water" gave the band their highest-charting hit on the US Billboard Modern Rock Tracks chart, peaking at number four, and their second number one on the Billboard Triple-A chart. It also charted in Canada, peaking at number 21 on the RPM 100 Hit Tracks chart and number three on the RPM Alternative 30.

== Track listings ==
US single

1. "Don't Drink the Water" (edit) – 4:35
2. "Don't Drink the Water" (album version) – 7:03

Australia single

1. "Don't Drink the Water" (edit) – 4:35
2. "Crash into Me" (live) – 5:33
3. "Tripping Billies" (live) – 5:28

== Charts ==
=== Weekly charts ===
Chart (1998)	Peak position
Canada Top Singles (RPM)	21
Canada Adult Contemporary (RPM)	56
Canada Rock/Alternative (RPM)	3
US Radio Songs (Billboard)	50
US Adult Alternative Airplay (Billboard)	1
US Alternative Airplay (Billboard)	4
US Mainstream Rock (Billboard)	19

=== Year-end charts ===
Chart (1998)	Position
Canada Rock/Alternative (RPM)	36
US Mainstream Rock Tracks (Billboard)	68
US Modern Rock Tracks (Billboard)	30
US Triple-A (Billboard)	35
