= Boyd Tinsley =

American musician

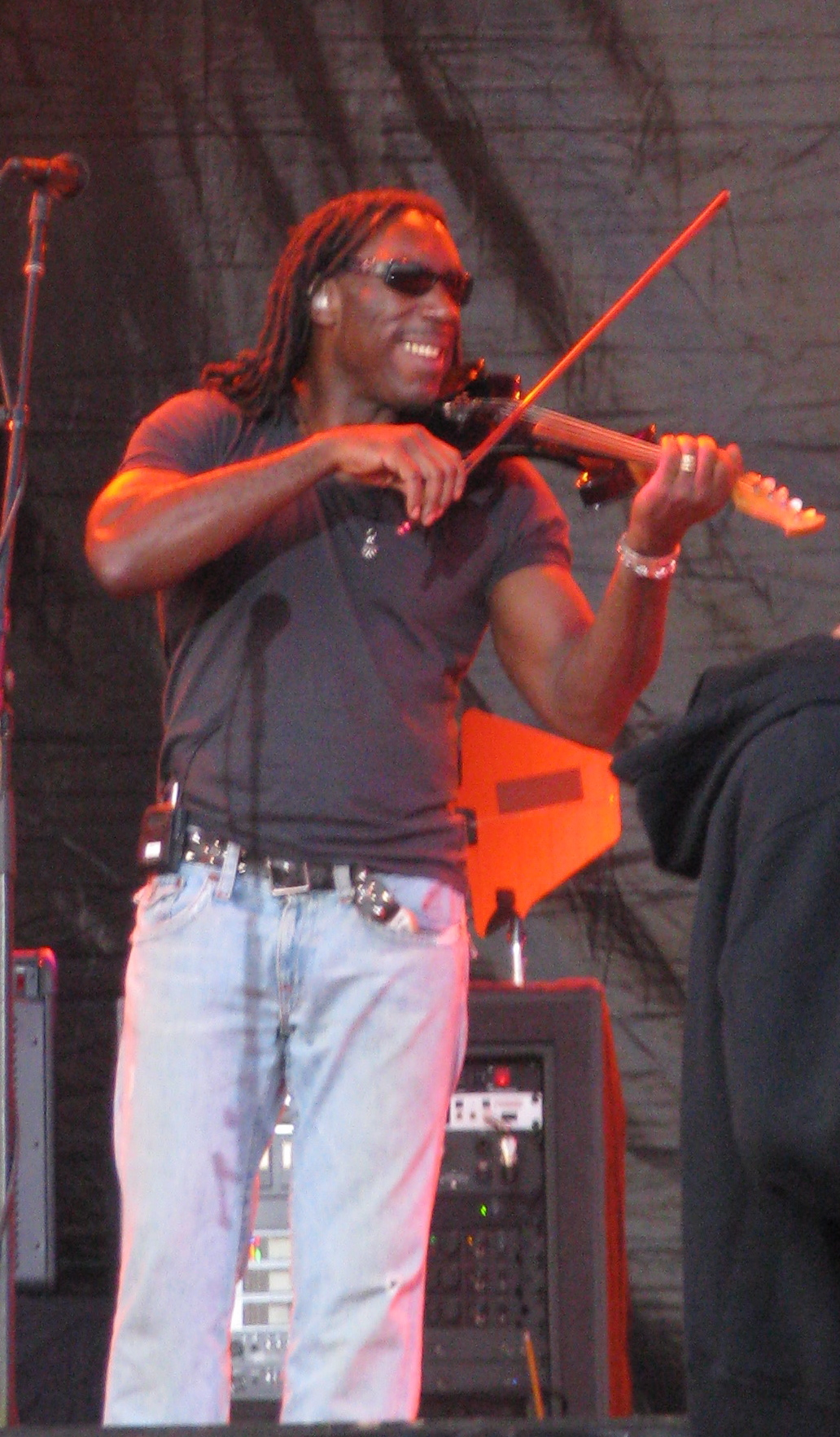
- Tinsley playing an electric violin in July 2008

Background information
- Born: May 16, 1964 (age 62); Charlottesville, Virginia, United States
- Genres: Rock; classical; alternative rock
- Occupations: Musician; composer; athlete; poet
- Instruments: Violin; viola; mandolin; vocals; guitar
- Years active: 1991–present
- Label: RCA

Boyd Calvin Tinsley (born May 16, 1964) is an American violinist and mandolinist who is best known for having been a member of the Dave Matthews Band.

== Early life ==
Tinsley was born and raised in Charlottesville, Virginia. He grew up in a musical family; his father was a choir director and his uncle a bassist who also played the trumpet for local bands. Tinsley was an aspiring guitarist until middle school, when he discovered his proficiency on the violin. He studied with Isidor Saslav, then concertmaster of the Baltimore Symphony Orchestra but, at age 16, decided he did not want to pursue a career in classical music.

Tinsley studied history at the University of Virginia, where he was a member of the Sigma Nu fraternity. While in school, he formed a two-man band called Down Boy Down. After graduation, the band was expanded to The Boyd Tinsley Band, which became a popular Charlottesville band, performing covers and its own tunes, and opening several times for Blues Traveler.

== Career ==
=== Dave Matthews Band ===
In 1991, Dave Matthews asked Tinsley to play violin on the song "Tripping Billies" with his band for their demo tape. He still had his own band and would often join Matthews' concerts after playing his own gigs. He became a full-time member in 1992. Matthews later said, "We had no plans of adding a violinist. We just wanted some fiddle tracked on this one song "Tripping Billies", and Boyd was a friend of Leroi. He came in and it just clicked. That completely solidified the band, gave it a lot more power."

Tinsley and Peter Griesar were the first to share song-writing credits with Matthews, on the song "So Much to Say", which won the band its first Grammy. Tinsley was also the first to call the band 'Dave Matthews Band', a name which was meant to be temporary but which stuck.

Tinsley's other (co-) song-writing credits with the band include "41", "American Baby", "Everybody Wake Up (Our Finest Hour Arrives)", "Funny the Way It Is", "Pig", "Proudest Monkey", "Too Much", "Grux", "Shake Me Like a Monkey", "Lying in the Hands of God", "Why I Am", "Drunken Soldier", "Can't Stop", "Baby Blue", "Snow Outside", and "Idea of You". He also co-wrote the Jurassic 5 song "Work It Out", and a song which he co-wrote, "Break Free", appeared on the Dave Matthews Band's 2023 album Walk Around the Moon. He performed on all 10 of the band's studio albums, and its 14 live albums.

After noticeably struggling during the band's 2014 Australian tour, Tinsley revealed on Twitter that he had developed arthritis in his right hand. He underwent surgery to correct carpal tunnel syndrome.

In October 2024, when the Dave Matthews Band was inducted into the Rock and Roll Hall of Fame, Tinsley was included as an inductee.

=== Lawsuit for sexual misconduct ===
On February 3, 2018, Tinsley announced that he was taking a leave of absence from the band, citing exhaustion and the need to focus on his health and family. On the same day, lawyers for former Crystal Garden band member James Frost-Winn sent Tinsley a demand letter, formally accusing Tinsley of sexually harassing Frost-Winn over a one-year period, and requesting a settlement. On May 17, Frost-Winn, then age 28, filed suit against Tinsley. On May 18, the band confirmed that Tinsley was no longer a member, saying "we are shocked by these disturbing allegations", and "Boyd has been a member of the family since the band began and we want him to focus on his health and get better. We support his decision to do this and we're sending positive thoughts his way."

Tinsley responded to the suit, saying that reports of his alleged behavior were "one-sided" and that he would defend himself in and out of court. The parties reached an out-of-court settlement in June 2019, with Tinsley agreeing to pay $837,000.00. On February 21, 2024 another lawsuit was filed by Frost-Winn's representatives claiming that Tinsley had breached the mutual non-disparagement clause of their settlement via social media posts he made on February 22, 2022, where he said "The accusation is a total lie. There is a pattern of me being victimized by mentally unstable and money-grabbing people. This latest individual that I am speaking of concocted this incredulous story of sexual harassment."

=== Other work ===
In 2000, Tinsley made a guest appearance on The Getaway People's second album, Turnpike Diaries.

In 2003, Tinsley released a solo album, True Reflections, featuring the title track he had written over a decade earlier. Tinsley was the principal songwriter of the album. True Reflections focuses on Tinsley as a singer-songwriter and does not feature much violin playing.

On March 20, 2009, Tinsley appeared with former U.S. poet laureate Rita Dove at the Paramount Theater in Charlottesville when she launched her poetry book Sonata Mulattica, about 19th-century violin virtuoso George Bridgetower; Tinsley is mentioned in the first poem in the book, "The Bridgetower". He composed and performed a musical piece for the event, read a poem from the book and discussed his musical life in particular and the role of classically trained African-American musicians in general with Dove.

Tinsley was the producer, writer and composer for the 80-minute cinematic opera Faces in the Mirror, in which he also appeared as an actor. The film premiered at the Woodstock Film Festival on October 13, 2012.

In August 2015, Tinsley formed the band Crystal Garden with Mycle Wastman, Charlie Csontos and Matt Frewen. For two years, he looked for a specific group of musicians who would form a modern day rock band. On the forming of the band, Tinsley commented, "The band was an idea I had maybe three years ago. I really wanted to create a young rock band – not a pop band – but a real rock band that had the same sensibility that rock from the 1960s and 1970s had to it. You know, something rocking from the heart and expressing something real". In their first week of recording sessions at Boyd's studio in Virginia they tracked the bulk of their first studio album, Let The Rocks Cry Out, which Tinsley produced. The album was released digitally on all platforms March 14, 2017, and physically on April 22, 2017. The band appeared on numerous morning shows.

== Personal life ==
Tinsley has two children with his wife Emily: a daughter, Abigail (born 1995) and a son, Noah (born 1999).

Tinsley played in a celebrity doubles tennis match in 2007 with John McEnroe against Pete Sampras and Autria Godfrey. He has recorded a song called "The Ghosts of Wimbledon" for the 2006 ESPN coverage of the tournament. Tinsley sponsored the Boyd Tinsley Tennis Program in Charlottesville.

== Discography ==
See Dave Matthews Band discography for his work with the band.

=== Solo discography ===
True Reflections (2003) – #3 Billboard Internet Sales chart
