= Stay (Wasting Time) =

1998 single by Dave Matthews Band

Single by Dave Matthews Band

from the album Before These Crowded Streets
- Released: June 28, 1998
- Length: 5:35 (album version); 4:30 (album edit)
- Label: RCA
- Songwriters: David J. Matthews; Stefan Lessard; LeRoi Moore
- Producer: Steve Lillywhite

Dave Matthews Band singles chronology
"Don't Drink the Water" (1998)	"Stay (Wasting Time)" (1998)	"Crush" (1998)

Music video
- "Stay (Wasting Time)" on YouTube

"Stay (Wasting Time)" is a song by American rock band Dave Matthews Band, released as the second single from their third studio album, Before These Crowded Streets. The song features Tawatha Agee, Cindy Mizell, and Brenda White King on background vocals. As a single, it reached number eight on the US Billboard Modern Rock Tracks chart and stayed at number one on the Billboard Triple-A chart for seven weeks. The song was used by the Virginia Tourism Corporation for a 2005 television commercial.

== Track listings ==
Australian version

1. "Stay (Wasting Time)" (edit) – 2:55
2. "Stay (Wasting Time)" (album edit) – 4:30
3. "Lover Lay Down" – 6:22

== Charts ==
=== Weekly charts ===
Chart (1998)	Peak position
Canada Top Singles (RPM)	31
US Radio Songs (Billboard)	44
US Adult Alternative Airplay (Billboard)	1
US Alternative Airplay (Billboard)	8
US Adult Pop Airplay (Billboard)	20
US Mainstream Rock (Billboard)	35
US Pop Airplay (Billboard)	33

=== Year-end charts ===
Chart (1998)	Position
US Adult Top 40 (Billboard)	48
US Modern Rock Tracks (Billboard)	49
US Triple-A (Billboard)	6
