= Carter Beauford =

American drummer (born 1958)

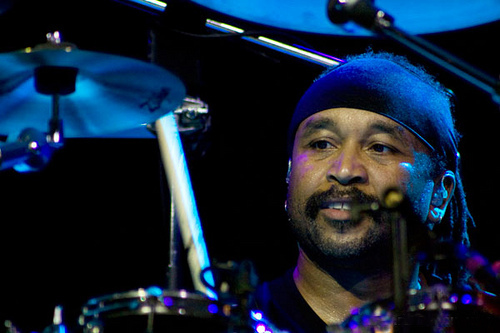
- Beauford performing in 2008

Background information
- Born: Carter Anthony Beauford; November 2, 1958 (age 67); Charlottesville, Virginia, United States
- Genres: Alternative rock; jazz fusion; R&B; world
- Occupations: Musician; composer; arranger; drummer
- Instruments: Drums; percussion; vocals
- Years active: 1991–present
- Label: RCA
- Website: davematthewsband.com

Carter Anthony Beauford (born November 2, 1958) is an American drummer, percussionist, and founding member of Dave Matthews Band. He is known for his ability to adapt to a variety of genres, and both his ambidextrous and his open-handed drumming styles. He plays the drums and sings backing vocals in the band. Beauford was ranked number 10 by a Rolling Stone magazine reader's poll in 2010 for the greatest drummers of all time.

== Background ==
Beauford was first exposed to the drums at age three. At the time, his father had bought tickets to a Buddy Rich concert and could not find someone to watch his son, so he took young Beauford along to the show. Beauford was mesmerized by Buddy Rich on stage. After that show, Beauford's father bought his son a tin drum set with paper heads, since Beauford showed so much interest in learning the instrument. Beauford began performing professionally when he was nine.

Beauford explains his unusual playing style in his instructional video "Under The Table & Drumming", attributing his use of left-hand-lead on a right-handed kit to playing his own kit in front of a mirror as a child in an attempt to emulate his favorite drummers, like Buddy Rich. He unknowingly set up his drums in reverse of whichever performer and set that he had in mind, in an attempt to make the mirrored image of himself match that of the audience's perspective, as he had seen it on stage and TV. This helped him to become completely ambidextrous at a very early age, albeit by accident.

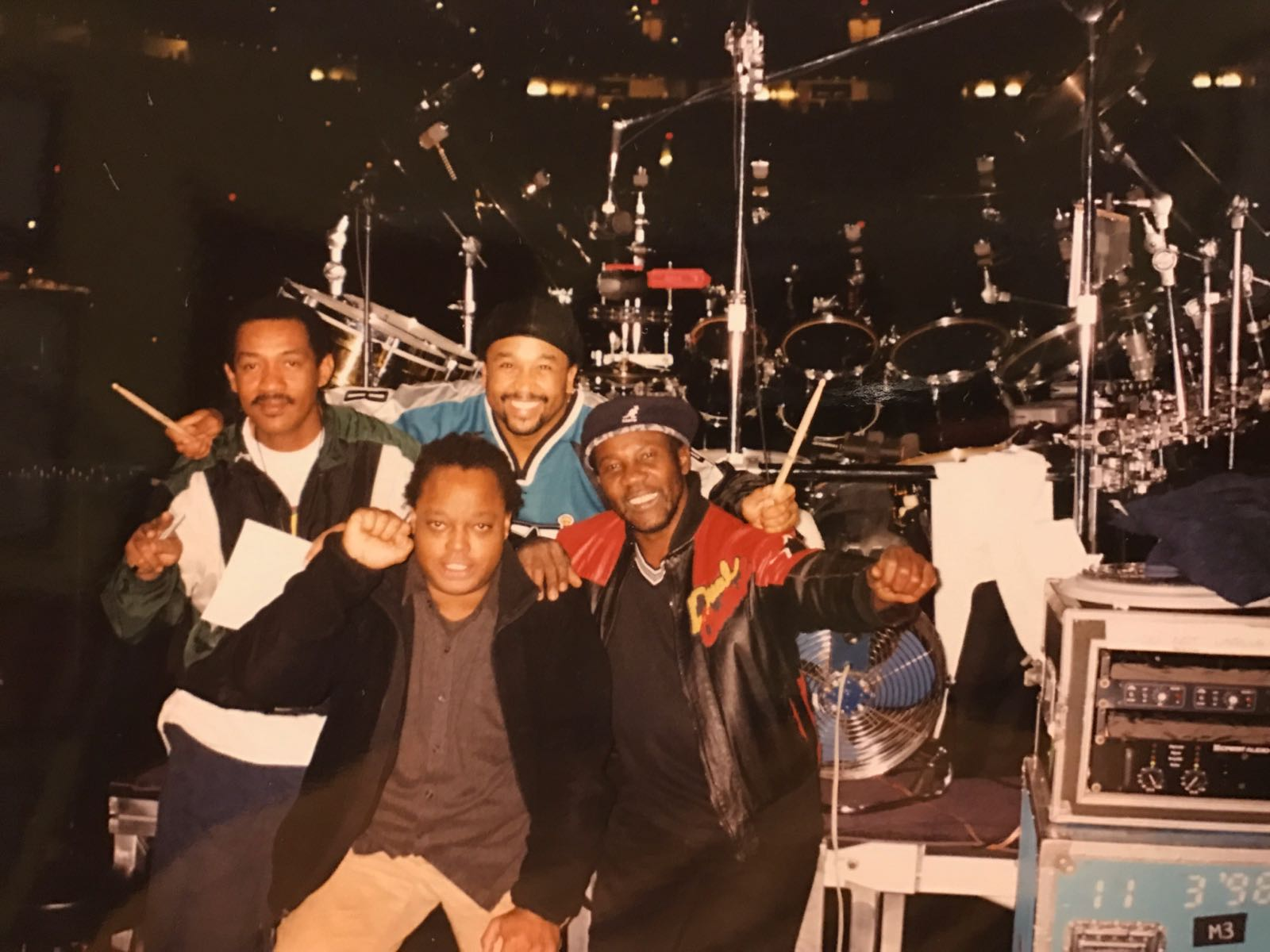
Members from Toots & the Maytals and Dave Matthews Band when performing together in 1998. Paul Douglas (left), Carter Beauford (back), LeRoi Moore (front), Toots Hibbert (right).

Eventually, he joined Secrets, a Richmond, Virginia-based jazz fusion band. Other members included childhood friend and next-door neighbor saxophonist LeRoi Moore, trumpeter John D'earth, vocalist Dawn Thompson, bassist Keith Horne, keyboardist Butch Taylor, keyboardist Dane Bryant, saxophonist Eddie Williams and guitarist Tim Reynolds. Secrets performed throughout Virginia, at places such as The Jewish Mother in Virginia Beach, and at Miller's, the bar in Charlottesville where Dave Matthews worked as a bartender. Beauford also played jazz in Blue Indigo with LeRoi Moore, Sal Soghoian, and George Melvin. Blue Indigo performed regularly at Tokyo Rose and Miller's, and was featured at the Delaware Water Gap Jazz Festival. Eventually, Matthews approached both Beauford and Moore regarding some music he had written that he wished to record. Beauford agreed to perform on a demo, which is how he became involved with the group that was to become the Dave Matthews Band.

== Collaboration ==
Beauford has also worked with other artists on jam projects, including Vertical Horizon, Carlos Santana, Rashawn Ross, John Popper (of Blues Traveler), Tim Reynolds, Béla Fleck and Victor Wooten; both alone and within Béla Fleck and the Flecktones.

== Awards ==
- Modern Drummer Readers Poll 2003 – Best Pop Drummer
- Modern Drummer Readers Poll 2003 – Best Recorded Performance: Dave Matthews Band: Live at Folsom Field, Boulder, Colorado
