= LeRoi Moore =

American musician (1961–2008)

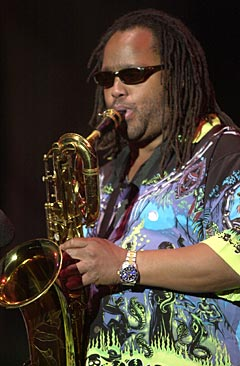
- LeRoi Moore performing in 2005

Background information
- Born: September 7, 1961; Durham, North Carolina, U.S.
- Origin: Charlottesville, Virginia, U.S.
- Died: August 19, 2008 (aged 46) Los Angeles, California, U.S.
- Genres: Rock; jazz
- Occupations: Musician; songwriter; arranger
- Instruments: Saxophone; flute
- Years active: 1991–2008
- Label: RCA
- Formerly of: Dave Matthews Band

LeRoi Holloway Moore (September 7, 1961 – August 19, 2008) was an American saxophonist. He was a founding member of the Dave Matthews Band. Moore often arranged music for songs written by Dave Matthews. Moore also co-wrote many of the band's songs, notably "Too Much" and "Stay (Wasting Time)".

== Biography ==
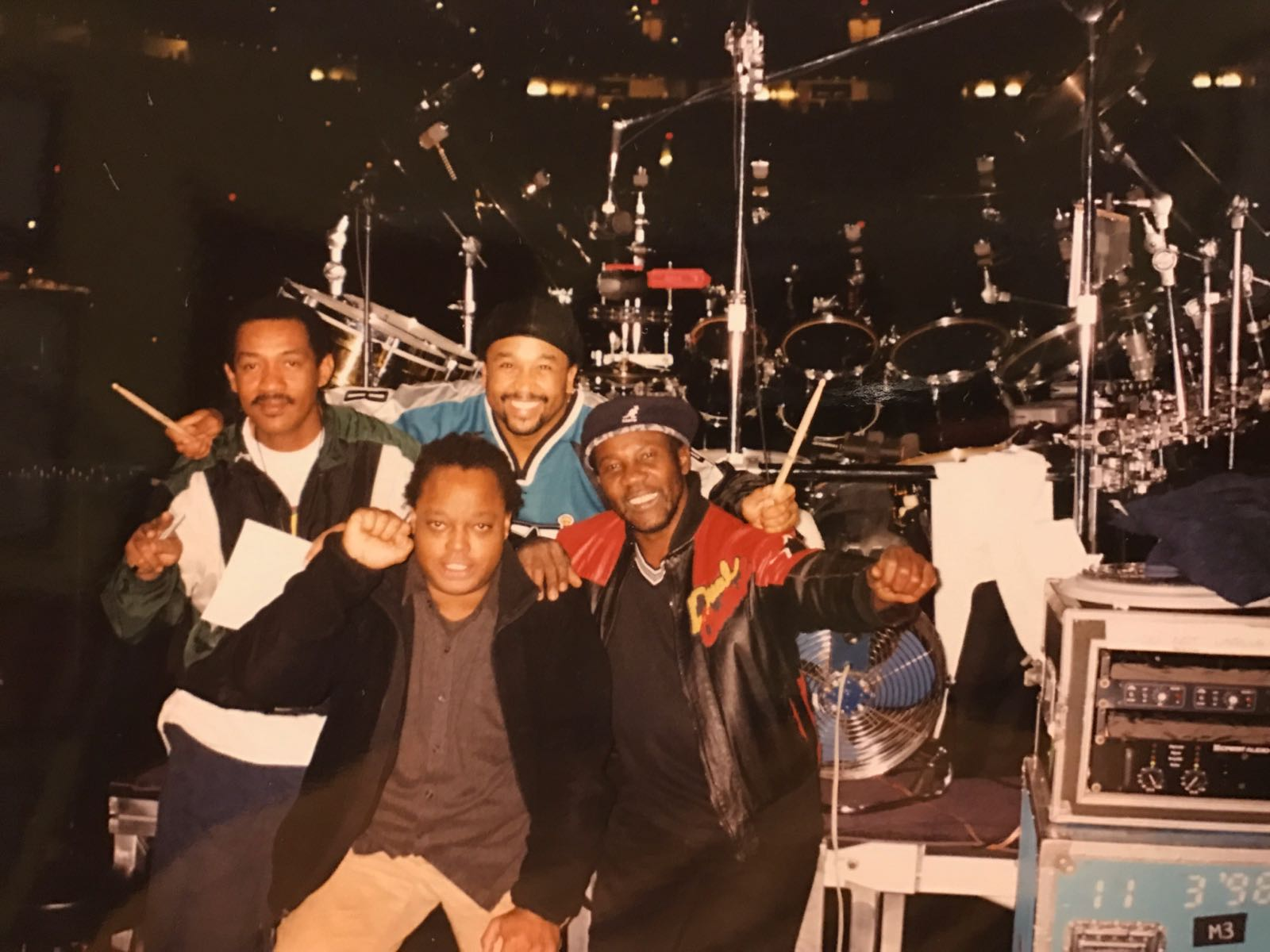
Members from Toots & the Maytals and Dave Matthews Band when performing together in 1998. Paul Douglas (left), Carter Beauford (back), LeRoi Moore (front), Toots Hibbert (right).

Moore was born in Durham, North Carolina to Roxie Holloway Moore and Albert P. Moore. Raised in Virginia, he attended college at James Madison University studying tenor saxophone, and later became an accomplished jazz musician in Charlottesville, Virginia, playing with artists such as John D'earth and Dawn Thompson. Moore began playing professionally after a brief stay in college. Moore helped found the Charlottesville Swing Orchestra (1982), and the John D'earth Quintet. The latter played at Miller's, a Charlottesville bar, every Thursday night in the late 1980s, where Moore first met Dave Matthews in 1991. In an effort to bring in instrumental help for some songs Matthews had written, Moore began recording songs with Matthews.

Moore played bass, baritone, tenor, alto, and soprano saxophones, as well as the flute, bass clarinet, the wooden penny whistle, and the oboe. Moore's woodwind technician, David Saull, notes that Moore had "quite an extensive horn collection."

In addition to performing with the Dave Matthews Band, Moore recorded a 1995 album with Thompson and Greg Howard under the name Code Magenta, combining improvised jazz grooves with spoken-word poetry. He appeared on In November Sunlight, the 1996 debut album of Sokoband (then known as Soko).

Moore also worked as a producer with artist Samantha Farrell on her second album, Luminous.

== Injury and death ==
Moore was injured on June 30, 2008, in an all-terrain vehicle accident on his farm outside Charlottesville, Virginia. His last live performance took place two days prior at the Nissan Pavilion in Bristow, Virginia.

Moore was riding an ATV on his farm to check a fence when he hit a grass-covered ditch, causing the ATV to flip and partially land on him. He broke several ribs and punctured a lung, and was hospitalized at UVA for several days. After his release, he was re-hospitalized in mid-July for complications related to the accident.

Jeff Coffin, the saxophonist from Béla Fleck and the Flecktones, stood in for Moore on subsequent tour dates, starting July 1, 2008, in Charlotte, North Carolina. This marked the first time a band member had missed a show since 1993, two years after the band was formed.

The following statement was released on the band's website:

We are deeply saddened to announce that LeRoi Moore, saxophonist and founding member of Dave Matthews Band, died unexpectedly Tuesday afternoon, August 19, 2008, at Hollywood Presbyterian Medical Center in Los Angeles from sudden complications stemming from his June ATV accident on his farm near Charlottesville, Virginia. LeRoi had recently returned to his Los Angeles home to begin an intensive physical rehabilitation program.

Matthews paid tribute to Moore on the day of his death at the Staples Center, Los Angeles, after the band's first song of the performance, "Bartender." "We all had some bad news today," Matthews told the sold-out crowd. "Our good friend LeRoi Moore passed on and gave his ghost up today and we will miss him forever." Fans then shouted Moore's name in remembrance.

On August 27, Moore was entombed at Holly Memorial Gardens in Albemarle County, Virginia. Attendance at the funeral numbered in the thousands, including the rest of the band, Moore's family, and dedicated fans.

Moore died three months shy of his planned November 8, 2008, wedding to Lisa Beane.

Dave Matthews Band released LeRoi Moore's final concert performance as Live Trax Vol. 14. The concert took place in the band's home state of Virginia in Bristow on June 28, 2008. Proceeds from the CD were donated to local charities that Moore valued.

At the 51st Grammy Awards, the first one following Moore's death, a video tribute to musicians who had died in the previous year excluded Moore, disappointing and angering fans. Neil Portnow, president of the National Academy of Recording Arts and Sciences, responded with a statement noting that Moore was included in a list of deceased musicians in the program for the event, and "unfortunately we are unable to include all of the talented and wonderful people within the allotted timeframe." This created tremendous outrage from the band's fans and many other music celebrities.
