= Dave Matthews =

American singer-songwriter (born 1967)

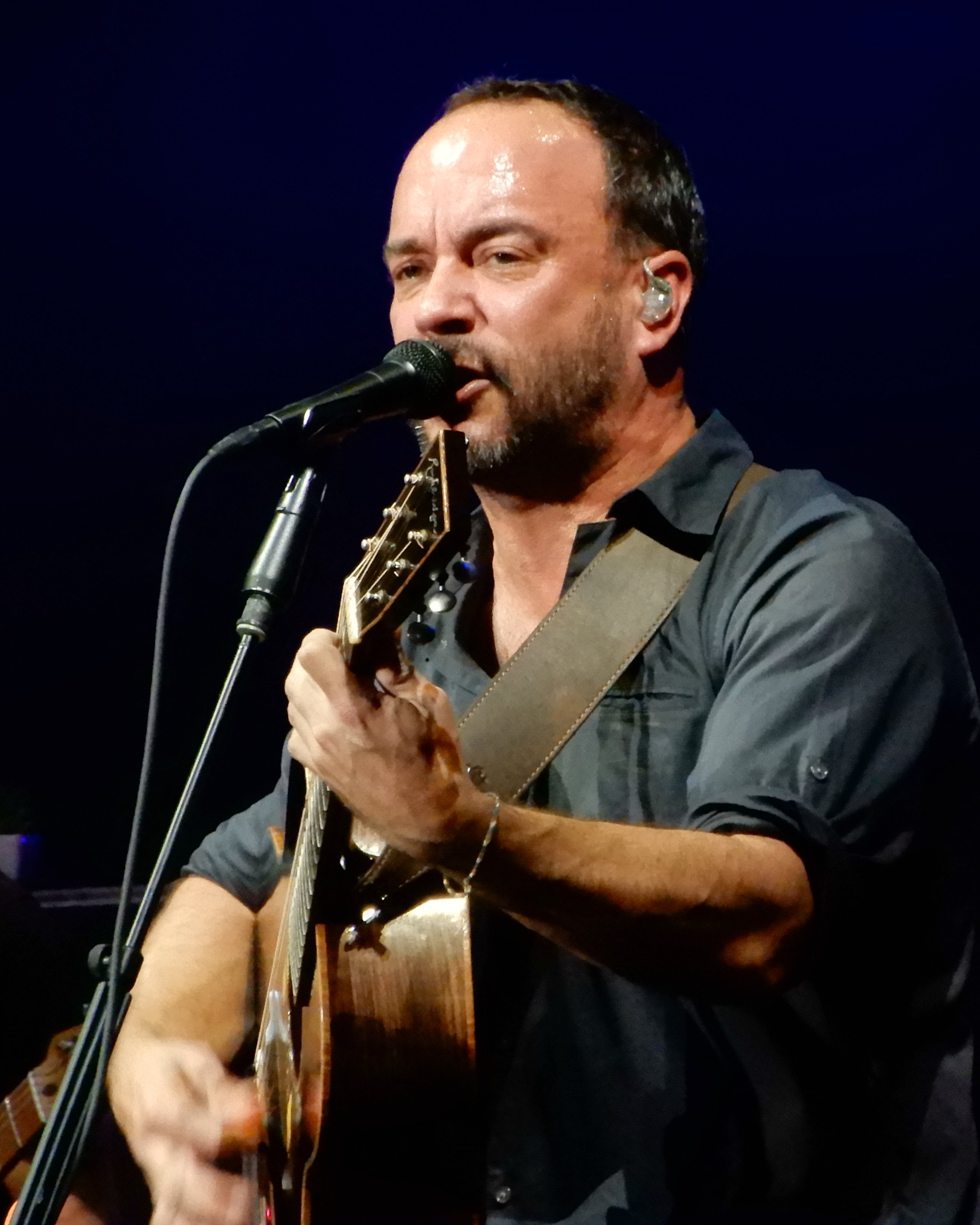
- Matthews in 2018
- Born: David John Matthews; January 9, 1967 (age 59); Johannesburg, South Africa
- Citizenship: United States
- Occupations: Singer-songwriter; musician; record producer; political activist
- Spouse: Jennifer Ashley Harper (m. 2000)
- Children: 3
- Musical career
- Genres: Acoustic rock; jazz rock; alternative rock; blues rock; roots rock
- Instruments: Vocals; Guitar
- Years active: 1989–present
- Labels: RCA; Sony
- Member of: Dave Matthews Band; Dave Matthews & Friends; Dave Matthews and Tim Reynolds
- Website: davematthewsband.com

David John Matthews (born January 9, 1967) is an American musician and the lead vocalist, songwriter, and guitarist for the Dave Matthews Band (DMB).

Matthews was born in Johannesburg, South Africa, and moved frequently between South Africa, the United Kingdom, and the United States while growing up. He started playing acoustic guitar at the age of nine.

From 1991 to 2003, Matthews predominantly focused on songwriting and performing with the Dave Matthews Band, which he started in Charlottesville, Virginia, in 1991. He also has done various solo performances and produced other records. The band relentlessly toured and performed yearly for nearly two decades through 2010, beginning with college party shows and quickly growing into arena and stadium tours by the late 1990s; between 2000 and 2009, the band grossed more revenue than any other act in North America. The band's 2012 album Away from the World made them the only group to have six consecutive studio albums debut at number one on the Billboard charts. This record was extended to seven consecutive number one albums with the 2018 release, Come Tomorrow.

In addition to music, Matthews has had multiple acting roles. He has also won two Grammy Awards: one with the Dave Matthews Band in 1997 for Best Rock Vocal Performance by a Duo or Group ("So Much to Say") and one in 2004 for Best Male Rock Vocal Performance ("Gravedigger") from his solo album.

== Early life ==
David John Matthews was born on January 9, 1967, in Johannesburg, the third of four children born to South African parents, John and Val Matthews. At age two, Matthews moved with his family to Yorktown Heights, New York, where his father, a physicist, started working for IBM.

In 1974, the Matthews family moved to Cambridge, England, for a year, then returned to New York, where his father died from lung cancer in 1977 when Matthews was ten years old. At some point, while residing in New York, Matthews attended his first concert, when his mother took him to a performance by Pete Seeger. The family returned to Johannesburg in 1977.

Matthews naturalized as a U.S. citizen in 1980.

Upon Matthews's graduation from secondary school in 1985, he was faced with conscription into the South African military just as civil disobedience to the practice was becoming widespread. As a Quaker (and consequently pacifist), Matthews left South Africa to avoid service.

Matthews moved to New York in 1986 where he worked for IBM for a short time, then joined his mother that same year in Charlottesville, Virginia, a town Matthews's family had lived in before he was born. In Charlottesville, he became part of the local music community, rehearsing in a warehouse owned by Roulhac Toledano. Although Matthews had started playing the guitar at age nine, it was only in Charlottesville that he started performing publicly. Matthews met local star (and future collaborator) Tim Reynolds through mutual friend, Nic Cappon. In time, Reynolds had Matthews join him on stage, and Matthews was persuaded to record some of his own songs. This led to his first professional musical gig at a modern dance performance by the Miki Liszt Dance Company, based at McGuffey Art Center in Charlottesville, singing "Meaningful Love", composed by John D'earth and Dawn Thompson. In 1991, he hatched the idea to form his own band. Before recording his first demo, Matthews bartended at Miller's in Charlottesville.

== Dave Matthews Band ==
Matthews discussing Before These Crowded Streets in 1998

After writing his first few songs, including "I'll Back You Up", "The Song That Jane Likes" and "Recently", Matthews formed Dave Matthews Band in early 1991 with LeRoi Moore, Carter Beauford, Stefan Lessard, Peter Griesar (who left the band in 1993), and Boyd Tinsley while working at Miller's as a bartender. The band's first show was on March 14, 1991, as part of a benefit for the Middle East Children's Alliance at Trax Nightclub in Charlottesville, Virginia.

Dave Matthews Band released its debut studio album, Under the Table and Dreaming, on September 27, 1994. It features the hits "What Would You Say" (featuring John Popper of Blues Traveler on harmonica), "Satellite", and "Ants Marching". The album was dedicated to the memory of Matthews's older sister Anne, who was killed by her husband in 1994 in a murder–suicide. Under the Table and Dreaming brought the band worldwide fame and was certified six times platinum. Under the Table and Dreaming and its follow-up album, Crash, brought the band a Grammy Award and four additional Grammy nominations. The band won the 1996 Grammy Award for Best Rock Performance by a Duo or Group for "So Much to Say", and was nominated for Best Rock Album for Crash and the Best Rock Song for "Too Much". The band had also been nominated in 1995 for Best Rock Performance by a Duo or Group and Best Music Video, Short Form, for "What Would You Say". The band achieved hits with "Crash into Me", "Too Much", and "Tripping Billies".

The band is known for playing songs differently in each performance; this practice has become a staple of their live shows since the early 1990s. As of 2018, the band has sold 20 million concert tickets.

Dave Matthews Band was inducted into the Rock and Roll Hall of Fame on October 19, 2024.

== Other musical work ==
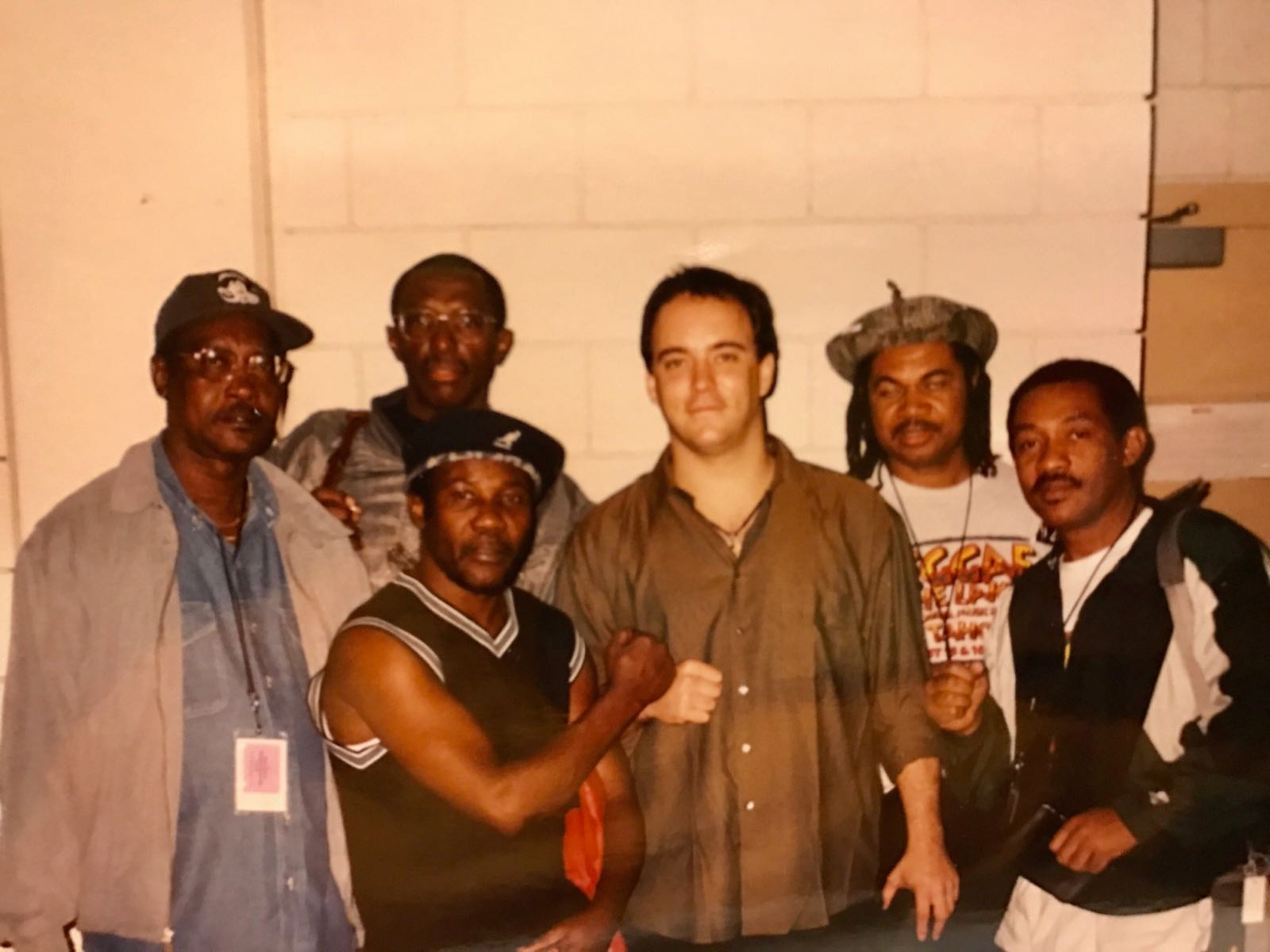
Toots and the Maytals with Dave Matthews when performing together in 1998

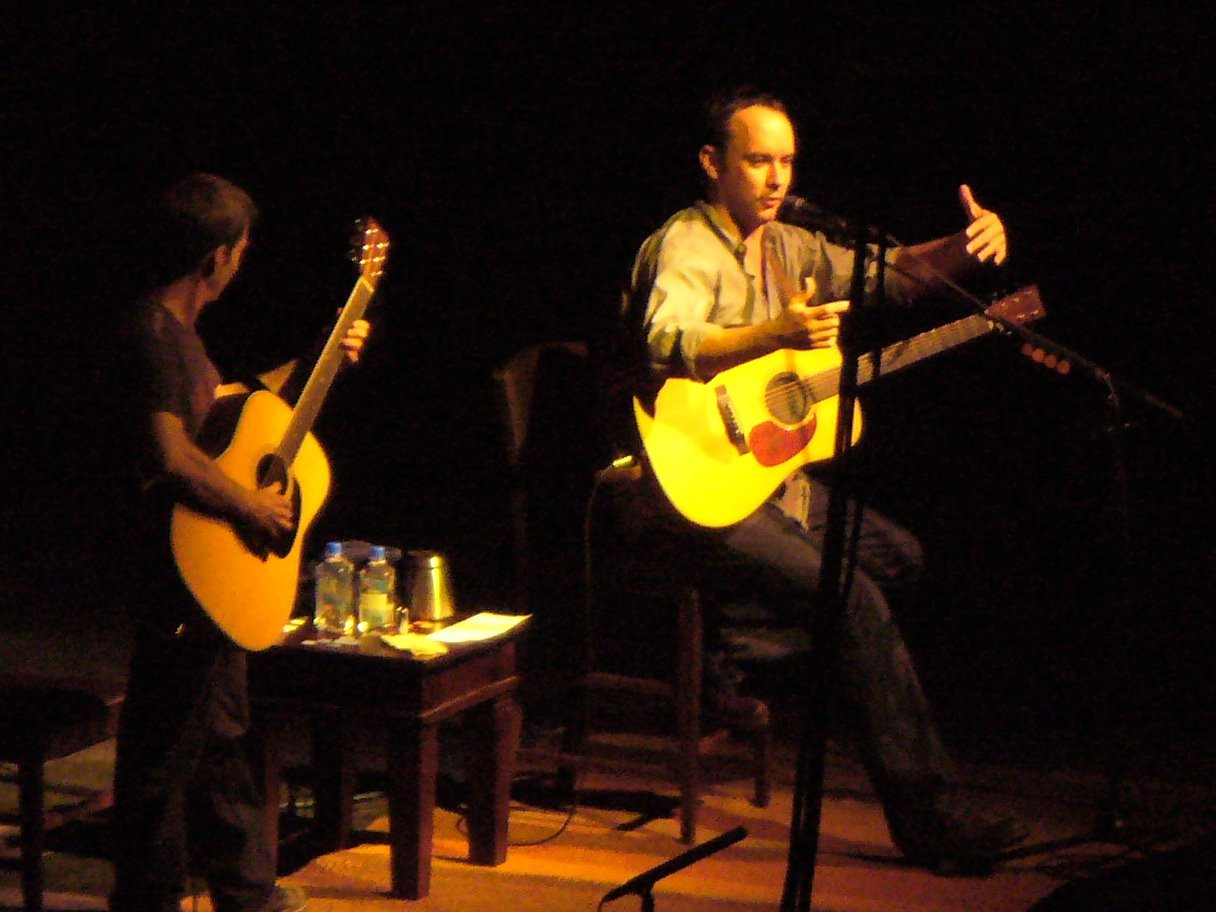
Tim Reynolds (left) and Matthews in 2007 performing in Amherst, Massachusetts, in one of many acoustic shows the two play as a duo

Matthews focused primarily on songwriting and performances with Dave Matthews Band from 1990 to 2003. The band's sound blends acoustic guitar, bass, saxophone, drums and violin. In 1994, DMB signed with RCA Records. Since that period, he has occasionally ventured outside the band in various solo performances and records. Matthews sang on the track "Sing Along" on Blue Man Group's second album The Complex in 2003. Later that year he released the solo album Some Devil, which went platinum; its single "Gravedigger" won a Grammy Award in 2004. To support the album, Matthews toured with a group of musicians (many of whom performed on Some Devil) under the name Dave Matthews & Friends.

Dave often collaborates with banjoist Béla Fleck. Fleck is the frontman and namesake of Béla Fleck and the Flecktones; Matthews appears as guest vocalist with the band on their 1998 release, Left of Cool. Both Fleck and the Flecktones' bassist Victor Wooten have made numerous live appearances and in studio with the Dave Matthews Band. Wooten soloed in the second part of the Daniel Lanois song "The Maker", and also in "#41" on the 1998 live album Live in Chicago. The Flecktones also opened for DMB on several tours. Matthews performed a duet with Emmylou Harris on "My Antonia" on her 2000 album Red Dirt Girl. They also appeared together on the musical television show CMT Crossroads, where the two performed Matthews's "Gravedigger" and the folk song "Long Black Veil".

Matthews played a cover of Neil Young's song "The Needle and the Damage Done" at the 2010 tribute MusiCares Person of the Year, honoring Young on January 29, 2010.

== Acting ==
In the early 1990s, before he was known as a musician, Dave Matthews was an amateur actor, appearing on stage in several productions at Charlottesville's Offstage Theatre and Live Arts theater. The role for which he is best remembered is as a used car salesman in Offstage Theatre's "Just Say No", directed by John Quinn, co-starring Kylie Suture.

Matthews played Will Coleman in the 2003 adaptation of the novel Where the Red Fern Grows.

In 2005, Matthews appeared as Otis in the film Because of Winn Dixie.

Matthews was a cast member and performer in the popular music documentary Before the Music Dies (2006).

In 2007, Matthews appeared briefly in the movie I Now Pronounce You Chuck and Larry, where he plays a homosexual salesman.

In 2007, Matthews guest-starred in the medical-drama series House in the episode "Half-Wit". He played a piano-playing musical savant who had the two hemispheres of his brain severed from each other in order to recover from his epilepsy, but at the expense of his musical abilities. Dave had a piano double for the complex pieces, but played the simpler pieces himself. In the season one episode of House, "Love Hurts", the song "Some Devil" can be heard playing at the end. In another episode, one of the tracks from Stand Up, "You Might Die Trying", was played in the season five episode, "Not Cancer".

In 2008, Matthews appeared in the Adam Sandler movie You Don't Mess with the Zohan as a racist redneck character named James.

Matthews had a significant role in Lake City (2008) with Sissy Spacek and Troy Garity, in which he portrays the character Red.

In 2011, Matthews appeared in another Adam Sandler film, Just Go with It, as wealthy "inventor" Ian "The I-Man" Maxtone-Jones.

== Other activities ==
In 1999, Matthews purchased more than 10 acres (4 hectares) of land in Albemarle County, Virginia, known as Blenheim Farm, to preserve its historical significance. He later decided to plant grapes on the property, since it is located within both the Virginia and Monticello viticultural areas. Blenheim Vineyards was founded in the year 2000.

In 2011, Matthews collaborated with wine makers Steve Reeder and Sean McKenzie in creating the Dreaming Tree Wines.

In April 2012, Matthews was credited as producer on the documentary Last Call at the Oasis, directed by Jessica Yu.

In early 2013, Matthews participated in a jam session at Blade Studios in Shreveport, Louisiana, with Jakob Dylan, Charlie Sexton, Blade studios co-owner Brady Blade, and Sexton's brother Will. This led to the formation of a band named The Nauts with Matthews, Dylan, Blade, and the Sexton brothers as members.

On May 16, 2020, in the midst of the COVID-19 pandemic quarantine, Matthews appeared streaming on the virtual graduation ceremonies for the University of Virginia. He wished students his best and said: "It is now your small opportunity to make the world a better place, as you see fit." He then sang the song "Singing from the Windows".

== Personal life ==
Matthews's older sister Anne, who lived in South Africa, was murdered by her husband in early 1994. The murder of his sister had a profound effect on Matthews's outlook on life and is referenced in some of his songs. Anne Matthews was survived by her two children, and they traveled to the United States following her death. Matthews and his younger sister Jane (after whom the Dave Matthews Band song "The Song That Jane Likes" is named) took responsibility for the children's upbringing.

Matthews married longtime girlfriend Jennifer Ashley Harper in 2000. They have twin daughters born in 2001, and a son born in 2007. They reside in Seattle. In a 2001 interview, Matthews stated that he was agnostic. He joined the Farm Aid board of directors in 2001, to serve alongside fellow musicians Willie Nelson, John Mellencamp and Neil Young to raise money for family farmers in the United States.

=== Political activism ===
Matthews supported Barack Obama for president in 2008, both in the primaries and in the general election. On April 6, 2008, he and Tim Reynolds played a concert titled "Change Rocks" at Indiana University to encourage students to register to vote. The tickets were distributed by the Obama campaign. Questions regarding his citizenship were answered by advertisements and videos on YouTube, where he says he is a "real American" and a "real Virginian," stating that "real Virginians get out and vote." Although bereaved by the loss of band co-founder and saxophonist LeRoi Moore on August 19, 2008, he and Tim Reynolds played for the Democratic National Convention delegates on Sunday, August 24 at Red Rocks.

On September 21, 2009, Matthews stated that some of Obama's harsher critics were motivated by racism, and stated that he "sees it [racism] everywhere" in the United States.

On May 10, 2012, Matthews entertained a sellout crowd at the Paramount Theatre in Seattle where Obama was hosting a campaign fundraiser.

In a September 28, 2015, interview with Rolling Stone, Matthews said that "when I hear someone like Bernie Sanders talking, I think there's a hope." Matthews performed at a San Francisco rally for Sanders during the 2016 presidential primaries and later, during the general election campaign. He was a major donor to the 2017 gubernatorial campaign of progressive Charlottesville politician Tom Perriello.

On October 30, 2021, Matthews performed at a Democratic get out the vote event in Charlottesville, Virginia with gubernatorial candidate Terry McAuliffe. During the 2022 election campaign, Matthews performed at campaign events for Democratic candidates Tim Ryan in Ohio and John Fetterman in Pennsylvania.

On October 3, 2026, Matthews performed at the Power to the People Festival at Merriweather Post Pavilion in Columbia, Maryland. The festival, which was produced by Tom Morello, also featured performances by Morello, Bruce Springsteen, the Foo Fighters and many others. The festival was held in response to U.S. president Donald Trump.

== Awards and accolades ==
=== Rock and Roll Hall of Fame ===
The Dave Matthews Band was inducted into the Rock and Roll Hall of Fame in 2024.

=== Grammy Awards ===
- 1997: Best Rock Vocal Performance by a Duo or Group – "So Much to Say", Dave Matthews Band
- 2004: Best Male Rock Vocal Performance – "Gravedigger", Dave Matthews

=== ASCAP Film and Television Music Awards ===
- Most Performed Song from a Motion Picture – "Where Are You Going" (for Mr. Deeds)
- Dave Matthews was awarded D.M.A. honoris causa by Haverford College on May 15, 2005.
- 2002: Matthews was the recipient of the Orville Gibson Award for Best Acoustic Guitarist.

== Discography ==
=== Studio albums ===
- Some Devil (2003)

=== Live solo albums ===
- Live at Sweet Briar College (2016); originally recorded in 1996

=== Digital downloads ===
Two shows have been released as part of the Dave Matthews Band's DMBlive series available only for online download.

- Dave Matthews Benaroya Hall, Seattle, WA (October 24, 2002) – 2008
- Dave Matthews China Club, NYC (01/09/2004) – 2008

=== Live albums with Tim Reynolds ===
- Live at Luther College – (1999)
- Live at Radio City – (2007)
- DMBLive. Prism Coffeehouse, Charlottesville, VA (04.22.1993) – (2008)
- DMBLive. Appalachian State University, Boone, NC (03.29.2003) – (2008)
- Live in Las Vegas – (2010)
- Live Trax Vol. 23 Whittemore Center Arena, Durham, NH (02.19.96) – (2012)
- Live Trax Vol. 24 Spartanburg Memorial, Spartanburg, SC (02.08.97) – (2012)
- DMBLive. Memphis, Richmond, VA (06.13.1993) – (2012)
- DMBLive. J.T. Kingsbury Hall, Salt Lake City, UT (03.03.1999) – (2014)
- Live Trax Vol. 41 Berkeley Community Theater, Berkeley, CA (03.13.99) – (2017)
- Live Trax Vol. 48 The Birchmere, Alexandria, VA (08.25.94) – (2019)
- Live Trax Vol. 49 Constellation Brands – Marvin Sands Performing Arts Center, Canandaigua, NY, (06.18.19) – (2019)

=== Singles ===
Year	Single	Chart positions				Album
Year	Single	US Mod	US Adult	US AAA	US Pop	Album
2003	"Gravedigger"	35	35	7	—	Some Devil
2003	"Save Me"	—	26	1	—	Some Devil
2004	"Oh"	—	—	1	—	Some Devil
2007	"Eh Hee"	—	—	—	73	Non-album single
2024	"Pretty Bird"	—	—	—	—	Non-album single
"—" denotes releases that did not chart

=== Guest singles ===
Year	Single	Artist	Chart positions			Album
Year	Single	Artist	US Country	US	CAN	Album
2009	"I'm Alive"^{A}	Kenny Chesney	6	32	73	Greatest Hits II

- ^{A} "I What What" charted as an album cut in 2008 before being released as a single in 2009

== Videography ==
=== Video albums ===
Title	Album details
Live at Radio City	Released: 2007; Label: RCA / BMG; Formats: DVD, Blu-ray

=== Collaborations ===
- "Eleanor" and "See Jane" (1994), off the Shannon Worrell album Three Wishes
- "Communication" and "Trouble and Strife" (1998), off the Béla Fleck and the Flecktones album Left of Cool
- "Love Of My Life" (1999), off the Santana album Supernatural (Santana album)
- "My Antonia" (2000) off the Emmylou Harris studio album Red Dirt Girl, where Dave duets with Emmylou on her composition
- "For You" (2002) off the We Were Soldiers soundtrack with Johnny Cash
- "Iwoya" (2002) off the Angélique Kidjo album Black Ivory Soul
- "Joyful Girl" (2002) off the Soulive album Next
- "Sing Along" (2003) off the Blue Man Group album The Complex with music video
- "Tremendous Brunettes" (2005) off the Mike Doughty album Haughty Melodic
- "Love Is The Only Way" (2006) off the Robert Randolph and the Family Band album Colorblind
- "Work It Out" produced by DJ Nu-Mark (2006) off the Jurassic 5 album Feedback
- "Fat Man in the Bathtub" (2008) off the Little Feat album "Join the Band"
- "I'm Alive" (2008) off the Kenny Chesney album Lucky Old Sun
- "Mamma Boulet" (2008) off the Dave Grant album Bubbalon by Bass
- "Caveman", "Sleep" & "Overdue" (2009) off the Danny Barnes album Pizza Box
- "Tomorrow Never Knows" (2010), off the Herbie Hancock album The Imagine Project
- "You Should Know Me", "Oh, Bangladesh" & "And He Slayed Her" (2010) off the Liz Phair album Funstyle
- "All the Same"(2011) off the Vieux Farka Touré album – The Secret
- "A Pirate Looks at Forty" (2012) with Jack Johnson and Tim Reynolds, off the live album Jack Johnson and Friends – Best of Kokua Festival
- "Walk of Shame" (2012) with Jimmy Fallon, off the comedy album Blow Your Pants Off
- "Take Me to Tomorrow" (2013) off the John Denver tribute album – The Music Is You: A Tribute to John Denver
- "Forsaken Savior" (2013) off the Gov't Mule album Shout!
- "Sweetheart" (2018), off the Sarah White album "High Flyer"

== See also ==
- List of celebrities who own wineries and vineyards
