= Where Are You Going: The Singles =

Compilation album by Dave Matthews Band
- Released: February 7, 2025
- Genre: Rock
- Length: 2:26:19 (digital)

Dave Matthews Band chronology
Walk Around the Moon (2023)	Where Are You Going: The Singles (2025)	Take Me Back: Live at the Gorge (2026)

Where Are You Going: The Singles is a compilation album by the American rock band Dave Matthews Band that was released on February 7, 2025. It consists of two vinyl discs.

== Track listings ==
=== Physical edition ===
Side one
No.	Title	Writer(s)	Original album	Length
1.	"What Would You Say"	Dave Matthews	Under the Table and Dreaming, 1994	4:07
2.	"Ants Marching"	Matthews	Under the Table and Dreaming, 1994	4:31
3.	"Satellite"	Matthews	Under the Table and Dreaming, 1994	4:51
4.	"Too Much"	Carter Beauford, Stefan Lessard, Matthews, LeRoi Moore, Boyd Tinsley	Crash, 1996	4:21
5.	"Two Step"	Matthews	Crash, 1996	6:26

Side two
No.	Title	Writer(s)	Original album	Length
1.	"Tripping Billies"	Matthews	Crash, 1996	5:00
2.	"Crash into Me"	Matthews	Crash, 1996	5:16
3.	"So Much to Say"	Matthews, Tinsley, Peter Griesar	Crash, 1996	4:07
4.	"Stay (Wasting Time)"	Matthews, Lessard, Moore	Before These Crowded Streets, 1998	5:35
5.	"Don't Drink the Water" (Single edit)	Matthews	Before These Crowded Streets, 1998	4:38

Side three
No.	Title	Writer(s)	Original album	Length
1.	"Crush" (Single edit)	Matthews	Before These Crowded Streets, 1998	4:12
2.	"The Space Between"	Matthews, Glen Ballard	Everyday, 2001	4:02
3.	"When the World Ends"	Matthews, Ballard	Everyday, 2001	3:31
4.	"Everyday" (Single edit)	Matthews, Ballard	Everyday, 2001	4:10
5.	"Grey Street"	Matthews	Busted Stuff, 2002	3:52
6.	"Where Are You Going"	Matthews	Busted Stuff, 2002	3:52

Side four
No.	Title	Writer(s)	Original album	Length
1.	"Dreamgirl" (Radio edit)	Matthews, Mark Batson	Stand Up, 2005	3:32
2.	"You and Me" (Single edit)	Matthews	Big Whiskey & the GrooGrux King, 2009	4:20
3.	"Funny the Way It Is"	Beauford, Lessard, Matthews, Moore, Tim Reynolds, Tinsley	Big Whiskey & the GrooGrux King, 2009	4:28
4.	"Mercy"	Matthews	Away from the World, 2012	4:28
5.	"Samurai Cop (Oh Joy Begin)"	Matthews	Come Tomorrow, 2018	4:22
6.	"Madman's Eyes" (single edit)	Matthews, Beauford, Lessard, Reynolds, Rashawn Ross, Jeff Coffin, Arthur "Buddy" Strong, Rob Evans	Walk Around the Moon, 2023	4:00

=== Digital edition ===
No.	Title	Writer(s)	Original album	Length
1.	"What Would You Say"	Dave Matthews	Under the Table and Dreaming, 1994	4:07
2.	"Ants Marching"	Matthews	Under the Table and Dreaming, 1994	4:31
3.	"Satellite"	Matthews	Under the Table and Dreaming, 1994	4:51
4.	"Jimi Thing"	Matthews	Under the Table and Dreaming, 1994	5:57
5.	"Too Much"	Matthews	Crash, 1996	4:22
7.	"Tripping Billies"	Matthews	Crash, 1996	5:00
8.	"Crash into Me"	Matthews	Crash, 1996	5:16
9.	"So Much to Say"	Matthews, Tinsley, Peter Griesar	Crash, 1996	4:07
10.	"Stay (Wasting Time)"	Matthews, Lessard, Moore	Before These Crowded Streets, 1998	5:35
11.	"Don't Drink the Water" (Single edit)	Matthews	Before These Crowded Streets, 1998	4:38
12.	"Crush" (Single edit)	Matthews	Before These Crowded Streets, 1998	4:12
13.	"Rapunzel"	Matthews, Lessard, Beauford	Before These Crowded Streets, 1998	6:00
14.	"The Space Between"	Matthews, Glen Ballard	Everyday, 2001	4:02
15.	"When the World Ends"	Matthews, Ballard	Everyday, 2001	3:31
16.	"Everyday" (Single edit)	Matthews, Ballard	Everyday, 2001	4:10
17.	"I Did It"	Matthews, Ballard	Everyday, 2001	3:36
18.	"Grey Street"	Matthews	Busted Stuff, 2002	3:52
19.	"Where Are You Going"	Matthews	Busted Stuff, 2002	3:52
20.	"Grace is Gone"	Matthews	Busted Stuff, 2002	4:38
21.	"Dreamgirl" (Radio edit)	Matthews, Mark Batson	Stand Up, 2005	3:32
22.	"American Baby"	Batson, Beauford, Lessard, Matthews, Moore, Tinsley	Stand Up, 2005	4:35
23.	"You and Me" (Single edit)	Matthews	Big Whiskey & the GrooGrux King, 2009	4:20
24.	"Funny the Way It Is"	Beauford, Lessard, Matthews, Moore, Tim Reynolds, Tinsley	Big Whiskey & the GrooGrux King, 2009	4:28
25.	"Mercy"	Matthews	Away from the World, 2012	4:28
26.	"Everybody Wake Up (Our Finest Hour Arrives)"	Batson, Beauford, Lessard, Matthews, Moore, Tinsley	Stand Up, 2005	4:18
27.	"If Only"	Matthews	Away From the World, 2012	5:38
28.	"Samurai Cop (Oh Joy Begin)"	Matthews	Come Tomorrow, 2018	4:22
29.	"Monsters"	Matthews, Beauford, Reynolds, John Alagía	Walk Around the Moon, 2023	3:33
30.	"Madman's Eyes" (Single edit)	Matthews, Beauford, Lessard, Reynolds, Rashawn Ross, Jeff Coffin, Buddy Strong	Walk Around the Moon, 2023	4:00
31.	"Walk Around the Moon"	Matthews, Beauford, Lessard, Reynolds, Ross, Coffin, Buddy Strong, Rob Evans	Walk Around the Moon, 2023	4:50
Total length:				2:26:19

== Personnel ==
- Dave Matthews – vocals, piano, sitar, guitar, vocals, tambourine, synthesizer, acoustic guitar, electric guitar, background vocals
- Boyd Tinsley – mandolin, background vocals, violin, vocals
- Cindy Mizelle – background vocals
- William Frank "Bill" Reichenbach Jr. – trumpet, trombone
- Stefan Lessard – bass, piano, keyboards, synthesizer, bass guitar
- Carter Beauford bongos, cabasa, congas, vocals, percussion, vibraphone, background vocals, drums
- Butch Taylor – keyboards, organ, piano
- Brenda White-King – background vocals
- Ana Landauer – violin
- David Campbell – conductor
- Joe Lawlor – guitar
- Rob Cavallo – organ, piano
- LeRoi Moore – flute, vocals, woodwind, saxophone, alto saxophone, tenor saxophone, soprano saxophone, baariton saxophone, bass clarinet, background vocals
- Andrew Duckles – viola
- Dan Higgins – tenor saxophone
- Alyssa Park – violin
- Tim Pierce – guitar
- Tim Reynolds – guitar, mandolin, acoustic guitar, electric guitar, 12-string guitar
- Josefina Vergara – violin
- Tawatha Agee – background vocals
- Arthur "Buddy" Strong – organ, piano, background vocals
- Tereza Stanislav – violin
- Michael McDonald – background vocals
- Susan Chatman – violin
- Paula Hochhalter – cello
- Gary Grant – trumpet, flugelhorn
- Glen Ballard – keyboards
- Rashawn Ross – horn, trumpet, keyboards, flugelhorn, background vocals
- Bela Fleck – banjo
- Oliver Kraus – strings
- John Alagia – organ, piano, guitar, co-producer, drum machine, slide guitar, electric guitar, vocals background
- Charlie Bisharat – violin
- Jamie Muhoberac – organ, keyboards
- Jeff Coffin – flute, saxophone, tenor saxophone,soprano saxophone,baritone saxophone
- John Popper – harmonica
- Ann Marie Calhoun – violin
- Thomas Evans – trombone
- Alanis Morissette – guest vocals
- Danny Barnes – banjo
- Mira Stone – violin
- Andrew Page – background vocals
- Jenny Takamatsu – violin
- Jennifer Myer – viola
- Jeff Thomas – background vocals
- Sara Parkins – violin
- Mario de Leon – violin
- Luke Maurer – viola
- Alma Fernandez – viola
- Roger Smith – organ
- Jerry Hey – horn
- Mark Batson – organ, piano, vocals, conductor, keyboards, percussion, synthesizer
- Rodney Wirtz – viola
- Brandi Carlile – vocals
- Michele Richards – violin
- Roger Manning – keyboards
- David Gee – cello
- Kerenza Peacock – violin
- Giovanna Clayton – cello
- Thomas Harte Jr. – bass
- Julie Jung – cello
- Jacob Braun – cello
- Marisa Kuney – violin
- Suzie Katayama – violin

== Charts ==
Chart performance of Where Are You Going: The Singles
Chart (2025)	Peak position
US Top Album Sales (Billboard)	15
US Top Catalog Albums (Billboard)	33
US Vinyl Albums (Billboard)	8
