= Europe 2009 =

Live album by Dave Matthews Band
- Released: December 22, 2009
- Recorded: Piazza Napoleone, Lucca, Italy, July 5, 2009, and Brixton Academy, London, June 26, 2009
- Genre: Rock
- Length: 188:46
- Label: RCA

Dave Matthews Band chronology
Live at Mile High Music Festival (2007)	Europe 2009 (2009)	Live in New York City (2010)

Europe 2009 is a live album and video release by the Dave Matthews Band from several 2009 concerts in Italy and London. The concert on the three CDs was held during the Lucca Summer Festival in Lucca, Italy, on July 5, 2009. The concert featured on the DVD was at Brixton Academy in London, on June 26, 2009. Tim Reynolds, who resumed touring with the band in 2008, appears on both the audio discs and the DVD.

== CD track listing - Live from Lucca ==
=== Disc one ===
1. "Don't Drink the Water" (Dave Matthews) – 8:59
2. "Shake Me Like a Monkey" (Carter Beauford/Stefan Lessard/Matthews/LeRoi Moore/Rashawn Ross/Boyd Tinsley) – 4:56
3. "You Might Die Trying" (Dave Matthews Band/Mark Batson) – 8:27
4. "Seven" (Beauford/Lessard/Matthews/Moore/Ross/Tinsley) – 4:43
5. "Funny the Way It Is" (Beauford/Lessard/Matthews/Moore/Ross/Tinsley) – 6:01
6. "So Damn Lucky" (Stephen Harris/Matthews) – 8:40
7. "Everyday" (Glen Ballard/Matthews) – 8:30
8. "Crash into Me" (Matthews) – 6:36

=== Disc two ===
1. "#41" (Dave Matthews Band) – 21:24
2. "Spaceman" (Beauford/Lessard/Matthews) – 5:01
3. "Corn Bread" (Matthews/Batson) – 6:37
4. "Lying in the Hands of God" (Beauford/Lessard/Matthews/Moore/Ross/Tinsley) – 9:45
5. "Jimi Thing" (Matthews) – 14:10
6. "Why I Am" (Beauford/Lessard/Matthews/Moore/Ross/Tinsley) – 4:43
7. "The Dreaming Tree" (Harris/Matthews) – 14:33

=== Disc three ===
1. "Alligator Pie" (Beauford/Lessard/Matthews) – 4:41
2. "Ants Marching" (Matthews) – 9:21
3. "Gravedigger" (Matthews) – 5:20
4. "Dive In" (Beauford/Matthews) – 6:46
5. "Two Step" (Matthews) – 18:45
6. "Rye Whiskey" (Traditional) – 3:21
7. "Pantala Naga Pampa" (Matthews) – 0:39
8. "Rapunzel" (Beauford/Lessard/Matthews) – 6:48

== DVD track listing - Across the Pond ==
1. Intro
2. "Don't Drink the Water" (Matthews)
3. "Squirm" (Beauford/Matthews)
4. "So Damn Lucky" (Harris/Matthews)
5. "Shake Me Like a Monkey" (Beauford/Lessard/Matthews/Moore/Ross/Tinsley)
6. "Crash into Me" (Matthews)
7. "Funny the Way It Is" (Beauford/Lessard/Matthews/Moore/Ross/Tinsley)
8. "So Much to Say" (Peter Griesar/Matthews/Tinsley)
9. "Anyone Seen the Bridge?" (Dave Matthews Band)
10. "Lie in Our Graves" (Dave Matthews Band)
11. "Seven" (Beauford/Lessard/Matthews/Moore/Ross/Tinsley)
12. "Why I Am" (Beauford/Lessard/Matthews/Moore/Ross/Tinsley)
13. "#41" (Dave Matthews Band)
14. "You & Me" (Matthews)
15. "Lying in the Hands of God" (Beauford/Lessard/Matthews/Moore/Ross/Tinsley)
16. "All Along the Watchtower" (Bob Dylan)
17. "Gravedigger" (Matthews)
18. "Alligator Pie" (Beauford/Lessard/Matthews)
19. "Tripping Billies" (Matthews)
20. End Credits

Bonus Tracks

1. "Dive In" (Beauford/Matthews)
2. "Time Bomb" (Matthews)
3. "Spaceman" (Beauford/Lessard/Matthews)
4. "Two Step" (Matthews)

== Personnel ==
Dave Matthews Band

- Carter Beauford – drums, percussion, backing vocals
- Stefan Lessard – bass guitar
- Dave Matthews – guitars, lead vocals
- Boyd Tinsley – violins, backing vocals

Additional musicians

- Jeff Coffin – saxophones
- Tim Reynolds – electric guitars
- Rashawn Ross – trumpet, backing vocals

Technical

- Joe Lawlor – engineer
- Jeff "Bagby" Thomas – live sound engineer
- Jonathan Russell – mastering at Masterfonics
- Chris Kress – mixing at PMD Recording
- Danielle Warman – mixing assistant (Stereo, Surround and post-mix)
- Jon Altschiller – mixing (Stereo, Surround and post-mix)

== Chart performance ==
Year	Chart	Position
2010	The Billboard 200	120
2010	Top Digital Albums	23
2010	Top Rock Albums	38
