= Live in New York City (Dave Matthews Band album) =

Live album by Dave Matthews Band
- Released: November 9, 2010
- Recorded: Citi Field, Queens, New York, July 17, 2010
- Genre: Rock
- Length: 212:54
- Label: RCA

Dave Matthews Band chronology
Europe 2009 (2009)	Live in New York City (2010)	Live at Wrigley Field (2011)

Professional ratings
Review scores
Source	Rating
Allmusic	3/5 stars

Live in New York City is a live album by Dave Matthews Band recorded on July 17, 2010 at Citi Field in Queens. The album was recorded on the second night of a two night stint at the venue. Released on two CDs, the show contains a mix of new surprises and older fan favorites.

== CD track listing ==
=== Disc one ===
1. "The Stone" (Dave Matthews) – 10:46
2. "Warehouse" (Matthews) – 9:45
3. "One Sweet World" (Matthews) – 10:40
4. "Funny the Way It Is" (Carter Beauford/Stefan Lessard/Matthews/LeRoi Moore/Rashawn Ross/Boyd Tinsley) – 5:27
5. "Seek Up" (Matthews) – 16:54
6. "Seven" (Beauford/Lessard/Matthews/Moore/Ross/Tinsley) – 5:07
7. "Squirm" (Beauford/Matthews) – 5:04
8. "Crash into Me" (Matthews) – 5:36
9. "You Might Die Trying" (Dave Matthews Band/Mark Batson) – 8:39

=== Disc two ===
1. "Proudest Monkey" (Dave Matthews Band) – 6:51
2. "Satellite" (Matthews) – 4:41
3. "Spaceman" (Beauford/Lessard/Matthews) – 5:14
4. "Dancing Nancies" (Matthews) – 10:22
5. "Gravedigger" (Matthews) – 4:42
6. "Blackjack" (Beauford/Lessard/Matthews/Moore/Ross/Tinsley) – 2:00
7. "Stay (Wasting Time)" (Lessard/Matthews/Moore) – 6:27
8. "Two Step" (Matthews) – 15:58
9. "Some Devil" (Matthews) – 4:20
10. "Shake Me Like a Monkey" (Beauford/Lessard/Matthews/Moore/Ross/Tinsley) – 3:53
11. "Bass Solo" (Stefan Lessard) – 1:37
12. "All Along the Watchtower" (Bob Dylan) – 8:51

=== Big Apple Bonus Disc ===
1. "Why I Am"
2. "Grey Street"
3. "Big Eyed Fish...>"
4. "Pantala Naga Pampa" ...> "Rapunzel"
5. "#41 "
6. "Little Red Bird"
7. "Time Bomb...>"
8. "So Damn Lucky"

== Personnel ==
Dave Matthews Band

- Dave Matthews - guitars, lead vocals
- Boyd Tinsley - violins, backing vocals
- Stefan Lessard - bass
- Carter Beauford - drums, percussion, backing vocals

With Guests

- Jeff Coffin - saxophones
- Tim Reynolds - electric guitars
- Rashawn Ross - trumpet, backing vocals

== Chart performance ==
Year	Chart	Position
2010	The Billboard 200	36
2010	Top Digital Albums	24
2010	Top Rock Albums	7
2010	Top Modern Rock/Alternative Albums	4
