= Yukon Kornelius =

US musical group

- Origin: Toronto, Canada
- Genres: Alternative rock
- Years active: 2008–present
- Spinoff of: Barenaked Ladies, Guster, Dave Matthews Band, Spymob
- Members: Adam Gardner; Ed Robertson; Stefan Lessard; Eric Fawcett

Yukon Kornelius is a rock music supergroup. It consists of bassist Stefan Lessard from the Dave Matthews Band (the anchor member), singer/guitarist Ed Robertson of Barenaked Ladies, singer/guitarist Adam Gardner from Guster, and drummer Eric Fawcett from Spymob (billed for the first show as a special guest, but billed in 2009 as part of the band). The band's name comes from Yukon Cornelius, a character in Rudolph the Red-Nosed Reindeer and the band Korn. The band's shows have so far been known for including special guests. The band was originally put together for charitable purposes when the members were together for a planned ski/snowboard trip while filming Warren Miller's Children of Winter, a snow sports film.

== Debut performance ==
On January 9, 2008, Yukon Kornelius played its first show at Okemo Mountain Resort, Vermont. The show benefitted the Vermont and New Hampshire food banks, as well as Gardner's environmental group Reverb.

The band played several songs, including "Yukon Kornelius Theme", "Sympathy for the Devil", "Psycho Killer", "Careless Whisper", "White Room", Guster's "Center of Attention", "Pinch Me", "Lost in the Supermarket", "Stefan Jams on the Bass", and "Rockin' the Free World". Jason Biggs joined the band for a few songs, such as "Don't Fear the Reaper", and "Low Rider". Dee Snider participated in "Highway to Hell", and Snider and Biggs joined in for "We're Not Gonna Take It".

Full setlist including original artists:

1. Yukon Kornelius Theme – Improvised lyrics found at the Dave Matthews Band Almanac
2. (Don't Fear) The Reaper – Blue Öyster Cult
3. Low Rider – War—featuring Steve Morell of the Pete Kilpatrick Band on sax
4. Sympathy for the Devil – Rolling Stones
5. Psycho Killer – Talking Heads
6. Careless Whisper – George Michael — featuring Steve Morell of the Pete Kilpatrick Band on sax
7. White Room – Cream
8. Center of Attention – Guster
9. Pinch Me - Barenaked Ladies
10. Lost in the Supermarket – The Clash
11. Superman – The Clique (made famous by R.E.M.)
12. Improv Jam – Stefan Lessard
13. Rockin' in the Free World – Neil Young
14. We're Not Gonna Take It – Twisted Sister
15. Highway to Hell – AC/DC

Yukon Kornelius played at the Belly Up in Aspen, Colorado on January 24, 2009. Stefan Lessard mentioned via his Twitter account that a mini tour with additional dates was in talks, but due to band members' obligations with their own respective bands, they had to put it off.

The band played a show in Vail, Colorado on December 11, 2009. Amongst other songs the band covered the Dave Matthews Band song "Halloween" with Dee Snider on vocals.

Full set list from the December 11, 2009 show below:

1. Theme
2. Don't Fear the Reaper (Lead vocals by Adam Gardner, Jason Biggs on cow bell) – Blue Oyster Cult
3. Psycho Killer (Lead vocals by Ed Robertson) – Talking Heads
4. Pinch Me (Lead vocals by Ed Robertson) – Barenaked Ladies
5. Center of Attention (Lead vocals by Adam Gardner) – Guster
6. Sympathy for the Devil (Lead vocals by Adam Gardner) – Rolling Stones
7. Careless Whisper (Lead vocals by Eric Fawcett) – Wham!
8. Shimmer – Fuel (Lead vocals by Carl Bell)
9. Rockin’ in the free world (Lead vocals by Tyler Stewart) – Neil Young
10. Reaper Reprise
11. We’re Not Gonna Take It (Lead vocals by Dee Snider) – Twisted Sister
12. Round and Round (Lead vocals by Dee Snider) – Ratt
13. Shout It Out Loud (Lead vocals by Dee Snider) – Kiss
14. Highway To Hell (Lead vocals by Dee Snider) – AC/DC
15. Rock You Like A Hurricane (Lead vocals by Dee Snider) – Scorpions
16. Have Your Self (A Merry Little Christmas, Lead vocals by Dee Snider)
17. Halloween (Lead vocals by Dee Snider) – Dave Matthews Band
18. I Wanna Rock (Lead vocals by Dee Snider) – Twisted Sister

On December 10, 2011, the band performed a show in Vail again. The band Lit opened for them and several guests joined the band during the show. Guests include Jerry DePizzo and Marc Roberge of O.A.R., Boyd Tinsley and Rashawn Ross of the Dave Matthews Band, DJ Logic, Mike McCready of Pearl Jam, Brett Scallions of Fuel, and as always Dee Snider of Twisted Sister. Olympic skiing gold medalist Lindsey Vonn also came out during the band's final song.

Full set list for the December 10 show:

1. Since We First Met – Yukon Kornelius Theme
2. (Don't Fear) The Reaper – Blue Oyster Cult
3. Psycho Killer – Talking Heads
4. Pinch Me – Barenaked Ladies
5. Happier – Guster
6. Miss You – Rolling Stones
7. Night Shift – O.A.R.
8. Fool in the Rain – Led Zeppelin
9. Let's Dance – DJ Logic
10. Limelight – Rush
11. Song 2 – Blur
12. Destroyer – The Kinks
13. Fire – Jimi Hendrix
14. Touch Me – The Doors
15. We're Not Gonna Take It – Twisted Sister
16. You Can't Stop Rock 'n' Roll – Twisted Sister
17. I Wanna Rock – Twisted Sister
18. Halloween – Dave Matthews Band
19. Nightrain – Guns N' Roses
20. God Save the Queen – Sex Pistols
21. Highway to Hell – AC/DC
