= Samurai Cop (Oh Joy Begin) =

Single by Dave Matthews Band

from the album Come Tomorrow
- Released: May 10, 2018
- Length: 4:22
- Label: RCA
- Songwriter: Dave Matthews
- Producers: Rob Cavallo; John Alagía

Dave Matthews Band singles chronology
"If Only" (2012)	"Samurai Cop (Oh Joy Begin)" (2018)	"That Girl is You" (2018)

"Samurai Cop (Oh Joy Begin)" is a song by American band Dave Matthews Band. It was released on May 10, 2018 as the lead single from their ninth studio album Come Tomorrow (2018). The song has been played by the band live since May 2016.

== Reception ==
=== Commercial performance ===
"Samurai Cop (Oh Joy Begin)" was most successful on alternative adult contemporary radio, peaking at number 5 on the Billboard AAA chart. It was also a moderate hit on rock and alternative radio, peaking at number 18 on the US Hot Rock and Alternative Songs chart.

=== Critical reception ===
"Samurai Cop (Oh Joy Begin)" received positive reviews from critics. Rolling Stone likened the track to the work of U2 and highlighted Carter Beauford's drumming and Tim Reynolds' guitar solo.

== Personnel ==
- Carter Beauford – drums
- Jeff Coffin – tenor saxophone, baritone saxophone
- Stefan Lessard – bass guitar
- Dave Matthews – electric guitar, vocals
- Tim Reynolds – guitar
- Rashawn Ross – trumpet, bass trumpet, flugelhorn, horn arrangement
- John Alagía – piano
- Rob Cavallo – organ
- Gary Grant – trumpet, flugelhorn
- Jerry Hey – horn arrangement
- Dan Higgins – tenor saxophone
- Bill Reichenbach Jr. – trombone, bass trumpet

== Charts ==
Chart performance for "Samurai Cop (Oh Joy Begin)"
Chart (2018)	Peak position
US Hot Rock & Alternative Songs (Billboard)	18
US Adult Alternative Airplay (Billboard)	5
