= Live at Mile High Music Festival =

Live album by Dave Matthews Band
- Released: December 16, 2008
- Recorded: Mile High Music Festival, Commerce City, Colorado, July 20, 2008
- Genre: Rock
- Length: 2:34:40
- Label: RCA

Dave Matthews Band chronology
Live at Piedmont Park (2007)	Live at Mile High Music Festival (2008)	Europe 2009 (2009)

Professional ratings
Review scores
Source	Rating
Allmusic	2.5/5 stars

Live at Mile High Music Festival is a live album by the Dave Matthews Band from the 2008 Mile High Music Festival outside Denver, Colorado. In its first week of sales, the album debuted at #97 on the US charts. The concert featured many old songs such as "Don't Drink the Water", "Two Step" and "#41", as well as more recent songs such as "Corn Bread" and "Eh Hee".

This is the first album to be released by the band without saxophonist LeRoi Moore and the first to feature Bela Fleck and the Flecktones saxophonist Jeff Coffin for the entire set. Coffin stepped in for Moore after he was injured in an ATV accident. Moore died on August 19, 2008, from pneumonia, almost a month after this performance.

Tim Reynolds also sat in as a guest for the complete set, as he did throughout the 2008 summer tour.

It was released on Tuesday December 16, 2008.

== Track listing ==
Disc one

1. "Don't Drink the Water" (David J. Matthews) – 7:13
2. "You Might Die Trying" (Carter Beauford, Stefan Lessard, Matthews, LeRoi Moore, Boyd Tinsley, Mark Batson) – 7:29
3. "Eh Hee" (Matthews) – 4:25
4. "Two Step" (Matthews) – 14:05
5. "Proudest Monkey" (Beauford, Lessard, Matthews, Moore, Tinsley) – 8:10 »
6. "Satellite" (Matthews) – 5:07
7. "Corn Bread" (Matthews, Batson) – 6:42

Disc two

1. "Sledgehammer" (Peter Gabriel) – 5:55
2. "Stay (Wasting Time)" (Lessard, Matthews, Moore) – 6:53
3. "Old Dirt Hill (Bring That Beat Back)" (Beauford, Lessard, Matthews, Moore, Tinsley, Batson) – 5:12
4. "Jimi Thing" (Matthews) – 14:57
5. "#41" (Beauford, Lessard, Matthews, Moore, Tinsley) – 15:11
6. "Tripping Billies" (Matthews) – 6:38
7. "So Damn Lucky" (Matthews, Stephen Harris) - 8:09

Disc three

1. "So Much to Say" (Peter Griesar, Matthews, Tinsley) – 5:46 »
2. "Anyone Seen the Bridge?" (Beauford, Lessard, Matthews, Moore, Tinsley) – 1:59 »
3. "Too Much" (Beauford, Lessard, Matthews, Moore, Tinsley) – 5:10 »
4. "Ants Marching" (Matthews) – 8:50
5. "Gravedigger" (Matthews) – 4:49
6. "Louisiana Bayou" (Beauford, Lessard, Matthews, Moore, Tinsley, Batson) – 7:30
7. "Thank You (Falettinme Be Mice Elf Agin)" (Sly Stone) – 8:17

== Personnel ==
Dave Matthews Band

- Dave Matthews - guitars, lead vocals
- Boyd Tinsley - violins, backing vocals
- Stefan Lessard - bass
- Carter Beauford - drums, percussion, backing vocals

With Guests

- Jeff Coffin - saxophones
- Rashawn Ross - trumpet, flugelhorn, backing vocals
- Tim Reynolds - guitar
