= Come Tomorrow (album) =

Studio album by Dave Matthews Band
- Released: June 8, 2018
- Studios: Various studios in Seattle, Los Angeles and Charlottesville
- Genre: Rock
- Length: 54:26
- Label: RCA
- Producers: John Alagía; Mark Batson; Rob Cavallo; Rob Evans; Doug McKean

Dave Matthews Band chronology
Away from the World (2012)	Come Tomorrow (2018)	Walk Around the Moon (2023)

Singles from Come Tomorrow
- 1. "Samurai Cop (Oh Joy Begin)" Released: May 10, 2018; 2. "That Girl is You" Released: May 25, 2018; 3. "Again and Again" Released: June 1, 2018; 4. "Come Tomorrow" Released: June 14, 2019

Professional ratings
Aggregate scores
Source	Rating
Metacritic	71/100
Review scores
Source	Rating
AllMusic	4/5 stars
The New York Times	4/5 stars
Pitchfork	5.0/10
Rolling Stone	3.5/5 stars

Come Tomorrow is the ninth studio album by the American rock band Dave Matthews Band, and was released on June 8, 2018. The album is their first since 2012's Away from the World.

== Recording ==
Working between tours at studios in Seattle, Los Angeles and Charlottesville, Dave Matthews Band chose to record with several different producers, including John Alagia, Mark Batson, Rob Cavallo and Rob Evans.

Nine of the 14 tracks on Come Tomorrow were played live prior to the official album announcement on April 25, 2018. "Do You Remember" was debuted at Farm Aid in 2017, "Again and Again" appeared on DMB setlists in 2016 as "Bob Law", "Samurai Cop" had been a regular at Dave solo, Dave & Tim acoustic and full band shows since 2016, "Here on Out" was played live just once before the announcement and that came on the Seasons of Cuba PBS-televised special in 2016 with Dave being backed by the Chamber Orchestra of Havana. The band had regularly featured "Black and Blue Bird" and "Virginia in the Rain" at shows since 2015.

The longest-tenured songs on the album are "Can't Stop" and "Idea of You", both of which had been in the band's rotation since 2006. It was originally reported that "Come On Come On" was written in 2008, at an early session of the band's recording of Big Whiskey and the GrooGrux King, but the October 2018 leak of "The Batson Sessions" revealed that the song (previously titled "Come On") was virtually unchanged from an April 2006 session with Mark Batson. An extended version of "bkdkdkdd" was previously performed live under the title "Be Yourself".

The cover art for the album was illustrated by Béatrice Coron.

== Release and reception ==
=== Commercial performance ===
Come Tomorrow debuted at number one on the US Billboard 200 with 292,000 album-equivalent units, making it the biggest sales week for a rock album in over four years, and the biggest sales week for an album in 2018, with 285,000 copies sold. It is also their seventh consecutive album to achieve the No. 1 spot on the Billboard 200.

=== Critical reception ===
Come Tomorrow received generally positive reviews from music critics. At Metacritic, which assigns a normalized rating out of 100 to reviews from mainstream critics, the album received an average score of 71, based on 4 reviews, which indicates "generally favorable reviews".

== Track listing ==
Come Tomorrow track listing
No.	Title	Writer(s)	Producer(s)	Length
1.	"Samurai Cop (Oh Joy Begin)"	David J. Matthews	Rob Cavallo; John Alagía	4:22
2.	"Can't Stop"	Carter Beauford; Stefan Lessard; Matthews; LeRoi Moore; Boyd Tinsley; Mark Batson	Mark Batson	4:43
3.	"Here on Out"	Matthews	Cavallo	3:18
4.	"That Girl Is You"	Matthews	Rob Evans	3:16
5.	"She"	Matthews; John Alagía	Alagía; Batson	3:51
6.	"Idea of You"	Beauford; Lessard; Matthews; Moore; Tinsley; Batson	Batson	4:44
7.	"Virginia in the Rain"	Beauford; Lessard; Matthews; Tim Reynolds; Doug McKean	Cavallo; Doug McKean	6:09
8.	"Again and Again"	Matthews	Cavallo; Alagía	4:25
9.	"bkdkdkdd"	Matthews	Cavallo	0:27
10.	"Black and Blue Bird"	Jeff Coffin; Matthews; Rashawn Ross; McKean	Cavallo	3:33
11.	"Come on Come On"	Matthews; Batson	Batson	4:39
12.	"Do You Remember"	Matthews	Alagía; Evans (add.)	4:17
13.	"Come Tomorrow"	Matthews; Batson	Batson; Alagía	4:46
14.	"When I'm Weary"	Matthews; Batson	Batson; Alagía	1:56
Total length:				54:26

== Personnel ==
Dave Matthews Band

- Carter Beauford – drums (1, 2, 5–13), buckets (2)
- Jeff Coffin – tenor saxophone (1, 5, 7–9), baritone saxophone (1, 5), soprano saxophone (10)
- Stefan Lessard – bass guitar (1, 2, 5–13)
- Dave Matthews – vocals (1–8, 10–14), acoustic guitars (3, 4, 6, 8, 10–12), electric guitars (1, 4, 9), guitars (2, 13), baritone guitars (5), Fender Rhodes (7), Wurlitzer (8), piano (4), bass guitar (4), percussion (4)
- Tim Reynolds – electric guitars (5, 7, 9, 12), guitars (1, 8, 13)
- Rashawn Ross – trumpet (1, 2, 5, 6, 8, 9, 12), flugelhorn (1, 7, 10–13), bass trumpet (1, 5), horn arrangements (1, 8, 11–13), backing vocals (8)
- Boyd Tinsley – violin (6)
- LeRoi Moore – alto saxophone (2), tenor saxophone (6)

Additional musicians

- Nico Abondolo – bass (3, 8)
- Tawatha Agee – backing vocals (7, 8)
- Candice Anderson – backing vocals (7, 8)
- John Alagía – piano (1, 5, 10, 12), Hammond B3 organ (6, 12), Moog (5, 8), guitar (5), Nord lead (5), electric guitar (6), baritone guitar (13), backing vocals (13)
- Mark Batson – piano (2, 14), clavinet (5), Fender Rhodes (13), Moog (5)
- Steven Becknell – French horn (3)
- Charlie Bisharat – violin (3, 8)
- Chris Bleth – clarinet (3)
- Robert Brophy – viola (3, 8)
- Sharon Bryant-Gallwey – backing vocals (7, 8)
- David Campbell – string arrangement (3, 8)
- Brandi Carlile – vocals (13)
- Rob Cavallo – organ (1), Wurlitzer (9)
- Luis Conte – percussion (7–9)
- Mario DeLeon – violin (3, 8)
- Andrew Duckels – viola (3, 8)
- Karen Elaine – viola (3, 8)
- Rob Evans – wah pedal and claps (4)
- Joe Fatheringham – trumpet (5)
- Matt Funes – cello (3, 8)
- Gary Grant – trumpet (1, 8), flugelhorn (1)
- Tammy Hatwan – violin (3, 8)
- Jerry Hey – horn arrangements (1, 8)
- Dan Higgins – tenor saxophone (1, 8)
- Alex Iles – trombone (3)
- Alan Kaplan – trombone (3), bass trombone (3)
- Oliver Kraus – strings (11, 13, 14), string arrangements (11)
- Stephen Kujala – flute (3)
- Timothy Landasuer – cello (3, 8)
- Songa Lee – violin (3, 8)
- Natalie Leggett – violin (3, 8)
- Dane Little – cello (3, 8)
- Serena McKinney – violin (3, 8)
- Joseph Meyer – French horn (3)
- Grace Oh – violin (3, 8)
- Alyssa Park – violin (3, 8)
- David Parmeter – bass (3, 8)
- Sara Perkins – violin (3, 8)
- Bill Reichenbach – trombone (1, 8), bass trumpet (1)
- Michelle Richards – violin (3, 8)
- Steve Richards – cello (3, 8)
- Amy Sanchez – French horn (11, 14)
- Tereza Stanislauv – violin (3, 8)
- Rudolph Stein – cello (3, 8)
- Buddy Strong – Hammond B3 organ (10)
- Butch Taylor – piano (2, 6, 11)
- Josephina Vergara – viola (3, 8)

Technical personnel

- Engineers – Doug McKean (1, 3, 7–10), Rob Evans (1, 4, 5, 12–14), Steven Miller (2, 6, 11), Matt Dyson (9), Chris Kress (11)
- Additional engineering – Matt Dyson (1, 5, 8, 11, 12, 14), Aaron Fessel (5, 11, 13, 14), John Alagía (6, 10), Rob Evans (6, 8, 10, 11), Pedro Calloni (11, 12), Chris Kress (11), Jason Shavey (13), Sean Quackenbush (13), Julian Anderson (14)
- Assistant engineers – Tom Rasulo (1, 3, 7–10), Andrew Ching (1, 3, 7–10), Andy Park (1, 3, 7–10), Julian Anderson (1, 12, 13), Rob Evans (2, 6, 11), Wesley Seidman (3)
- Mixing engineers – John Alagía (1, 2, 4, 6–14), Rob Evans (1, 2, 4, 6–14), Doug McKean (3), Billy Centenaro (5, 11)
- Mastering engineer – Brad Blackwood
- Executive producer – John Alagía

== Charts ==
=== Weekly charts ===
Chart (2018–19)	Peak position
Canadian Albums (Billboard)	2
Dutch Albums (Album Top 100)	24
New Zealand Heatseeker Albums (RMNZ)	5
Polish Albums (ZPAV)	49
Portuguese Albums (AFP)	42
Swiss Albums (Schweizer Hitparade)	42
US Billboard 200	1
US Top Rock Albums (Billboard)	1

=== Year-end charts ===
Chart (2018)	Position
US Billboard 200	95
US Top Rock Albums (Billboard)	11
