= A Concert for Charlottesville =

American benefit concert

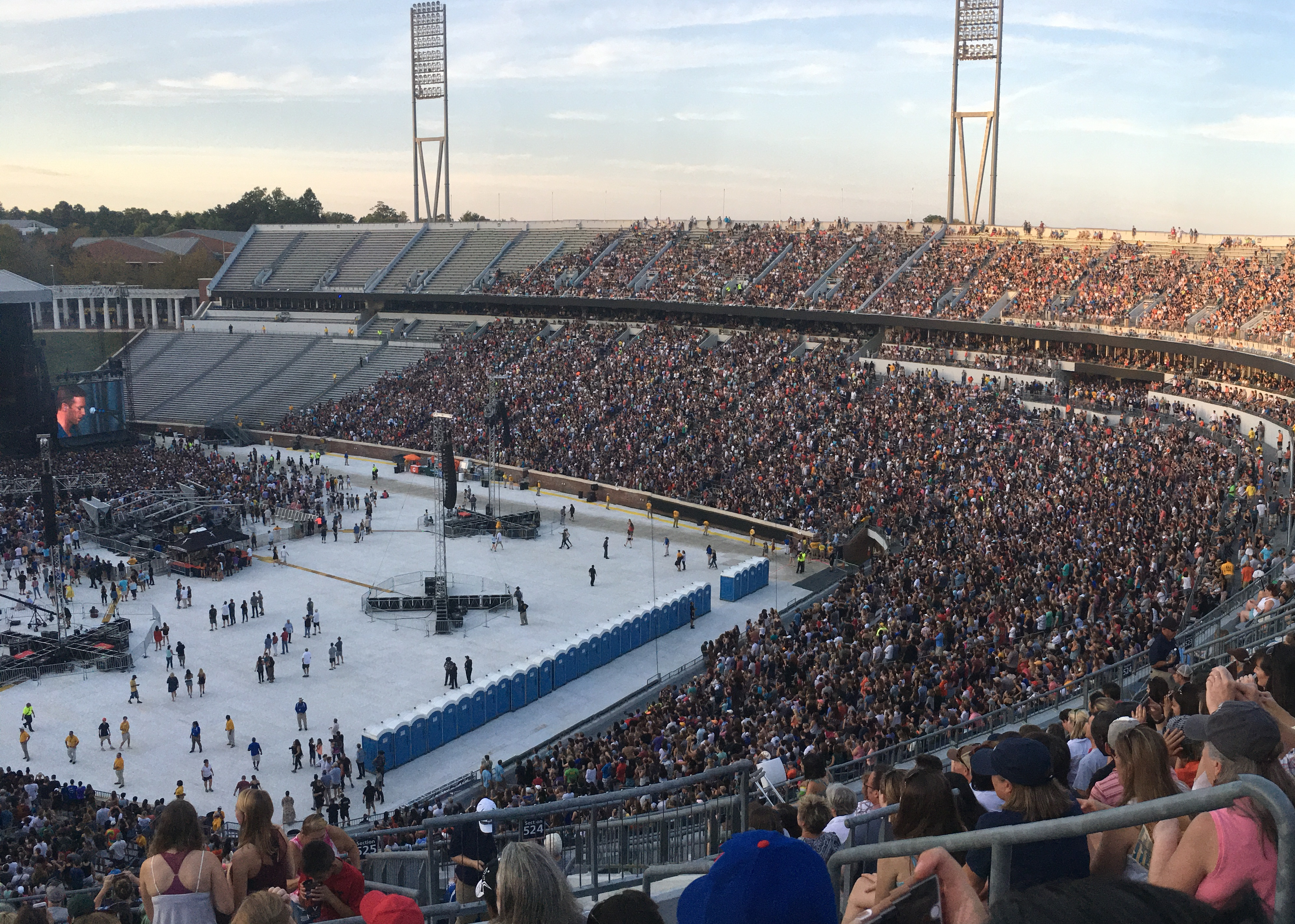
- Chris Martin of Coldplay performs during the benefit concert.
- Created by: Dave Matthews Band
- Starring: Dave Matthews Band; Cage the Elephant; Coldplay; The Roots; Bilal; Brittany Howard; Pharrell Williams; Chris Stapleton; Ariana Grande; Justin Timberlake; John D'earth; Stevie Wonder
- Country of origin: United States

Production
- Producers: Live Nation; Starr Hill Presents; University of Virginia
- Production locations: Scott Stadium, Charlottesville, Virginia, USA

Original release
- Release: September 24, 2017

A Concert for Charlottesville was a benefit concert held on September 24, 2017, organized by the Dave Matthews Band to raise funds for the victims killed and injured during the Unite the Right rally held from August 11–12, 2017. The band labeled the event as "An Evening of Music and Unity."

Tickets for the concert were free but prioritized for the greater Charlottesville area and students, faculty, and staff of the University of Virginia. Attendees were encouraged to donate to the "Concert for Charlottesville Fund," benefiting "victims of the events in Charlottesville on August 11 and 12, their families, first responders, and organizations devoted to the promotion of healing, unity and justice locally and nationwide."

The concert was also live-streamed to audiences around the world through platforms such as YouTube, Facebook, and by Oath Inc. sites, including Tumblr and HuffPost.

== Background ==
On the evening of August 11, a day before the Unite the Right rally was to be held, a group of white nationalists marched onto the University of Virginia campus. The marchers carried lit tiki torches and chanted antisemitic, homophobic, and misogynistic slurs at bystanders.

Just before noon on August 12, the rally was canceled after the Virginia State Police declared that the gathering was an unlawful assembly. After the rally was aborted, James Alex Fields Jr. drove his car through a crowd of counterprotestors on the Downtown Mall. One person, Heather Heyer, was killed and 19 others were injured in the attack. Two Virginia state troopers, Lieutenant H. Jay Cullen and Trooper-Pilot Berke M. M. Bates, were also killed while on their way to assist with public safety in Charlottesville, after their helicopter crashed 7 miles southwest of the city.

== Concert ==
Dave Matthews opened the concert by performing an acoustic rendition of "Mercy". He then invited Susan Bro, the mother of Heather Heyer, onto the stage where she thanked the crowd and asked them to be part of her daughter's legacy.

Bro's speech was followed by a performance by Cage the Elephant. Chris Martin and Jonny Buckland of Coldplay were then announced as special guests by Pharrell Williams. The duo performed some of the band's biggest songs as well as a cover of "You Never Can Tell" by Chuck Berry. The concert then proceeded with performances by The Roots with Bilal and Brittany Howard, Williams, Chris Stapleton, Justin Timberlake and Ariana Grande. The Dave Matthews Band and special guest Stevie Wonder closed out the concert by performing a cover of John Lennon's "Imagine", and Wonder's famous single, "Superstition".

Williams, Matthews, and Wonder at one point during their respective performances each knelt on stage, performing the gesture to show solidarity with NFL players protesting the National Anthem and in response to Donald Trump's criticism of the players.

The concert faced some criticism from local racial justice organizations, including Solidarity Charlottesville. These community members raised issue with the event being planned in part by Charlottesville city officials and University of Virginia leaders, whose inaction they viewed as being partly responsible for the violence on August 11 and 12, as would be confirmed in the Heaphy Report, commissioned by the city in response to the events of Unite the Right. A protest was held across the street at the beginning of the concert, with student and community activists holding banners reading, "No Unity Without Justice."

== Set list ==
1. Dave Matthews – "Mercy"
2. Cage the Elephant – "Punching Bag"
3. Cage the Elephant – "Cold Cold Cold"
4. Cage the Elephant – "Trouble"
5. Cage the Elephant – "Come a Little Closer"
6. Coldplay – "The Scientist"
7. Coldplay – "Adventure of a Lifetime"
8. Coldplay – "You Never Can Tell" (Chuck Berry cover)
9. Coldplay – "Viva la Vida"
10. Coldplay – "Amazing Day"
11. The Roots – "How I Got Over"
12. The Roots and Bilal – "It Ain't Fair"
13. The Roots and Brittany Howard – "Ball of Confusion (That's What the World Is Today)" (The Temptations cover)
14. The Roots and Brittany Howard – "Move On Up" (Curtis Mayfield cover)
15. Pharrell Williams and The Roots – "Feels"
16. Pharrell Williams and The Roots – "Get Lucky"
17. Pharrell Williams and The Roots – "Freedom"
18. Pharrell Williams and The Roots – "Happy"
19. Pharrell Williams and The Roots – "Blurred Lines"
20. The Roots and Pharrell Williams – "The Seed (2.0)"
21. Chris Stapleton – "Sometimes I Cry"
22. Chris Stapleton – "Second One to Know"
23. Chris Stapleton – "Broken Halos"
24. Chris Stapleton – "Fire Away"
25. Chris Stapleton – "Tennessee Whiskey" (David Allan Coe cover)
26. Ariana Grande – "Side to Side"
27. Ariana Grande – "Be Alright"
28. Ariana Grande – "One Last Time"
29. Ariana Grande – "Dangerous Woman"
30. Justin Timberlake – "A Change Is Gonna Come" (Sam Cooke cover)
31. Justin Timberlake – "Drink You Away"
32. Justin Timberlake – "Suit & Tie"
33. Justin Timberlake – "My Love"
34. Justin Timberlake – "TKO" (Intro) / "Holy Grail" (First verse & chorus)
35. Justin Timberlake – "Cry Me a River" (Contains elements of "HUMBLE." by Kendrick Lamar)
36. Justin Timberlake – "Rock Your Body"
37. Justin Timberlake – "Can't Stop the Feeling!" (Contains elements of "Lovely Day" by Bill Withers)
38. Justin Timberlake – "SexyBack" (Contains elements of "The Roof Is on Fire" by Rock Master Scott & the Dynamic Three)
39. Justin Timberlake – "Mirrors"
40. Dave Matthews Band – "Don't Drink the Water"
41. Dave Matthews Band – "Warehouse"
42. Dave Matthews Band – "Satellite"
43. Dave Matthews Band – "Seven"
44. Dave Matthews Band – "You Might Die Trying"
45. Dave Matthews Band and John D'earth – "Grey Street"
46. Stevie Wonder and Dave Matthews Band – "Imagine" (John Lennon cover)
47. Stevie Wonder and Dave Matthews Band – "Love's in Need of Love Today"
48. Stevie Wonder, Dave Matthews Band and John D'earth – "Superstition"

== See also ==
- 2017 in American music
- One Love Manchester
