= Away from the World =

Studio album by Dave Matthews Band
- Released: September 11, 2012
- Recorded: January–May 2012
- Studio: Studio Litho (Seattle)
- Genre: Alternative rock
- Length: 53:59
- Label: RCA
- Producer: Steve Lillywhite

Dave Matthews Band chronology
Big Whiskey & the GrooGrux King (2009)	Away from the World (2012)	Come Tomorrow (2018)

Singles from Away from the World
- 1. "Mercy" Released: July 16, 2012; 2. "If Only" Released: September 11, 2012

Away from the World is the eighth studio album by the American rock band Dave Matthews Band. It was released on September 11, 2012, through RCA Records. The album was primarily recorded at Studio Litho in Seattle, Washington from January to May 2012 and is the band's first to be produced by Steve Lillywhite since Before These Crowded Streets (1998). It is the band's last album to feature full participation from violinist Boyd Tinsley before his departure in 2018.

The album was a commercial success, becoming the band's sixth straight number-one album on the Billboard 200. Two singles were released—"Mercy" and "If Only"—which both found success on Adult Alternative radio. Critical reception was positive, with many reviewers praising the album's production, band interplay, and fusion of multiple genres, and multiple publications including the album on year-end lists of the best albums of 2012.

== Recording ==
Away from the World is the band's first album to be produced by Lillywhite since 1998, although he also worked with the band on their ill-fated "Lillywhite Sessions" in 2000, most of the songs from which were re-recorded with Stephen Harris for the band's 2002 release Busted Stuff. Frequent collaborator John Alagía also contributed, co-producing the tracks "Broken Things", "Mercy", and "Rooftop". Recording began at Studio Litho (established by Stone Gossard of Pearl Jam) in January 2012 and concluded in May of that year. On the band's recording process, Tinsley stated:

Some of the songs that you hear on this album, the basic tracks came out, like, the first or second time we played them. Dave would come in with part of a song. We’d get into the control room and we’d finish it, putting in a chorus or bridge here and working out arrangements. And then we went to the studio, and we just played.

Tower of Power's Roger Smith played Hammond organ on "If Only", while a youth chorus provided vocals on "Gaucho".

== Release and reception ==
On April 24, Matthews debuted soon-to-be lead single "Mercy" on Late Night with Jimmy Fallon. In May, "Gaucho" was made available for download from the band's website for members of the Warehouse Fan Association, although the song did not receive an official single release. Numerous tracks that would be included on the album—"Mercy", "Gaucho", "Sweet", "If Only", "The Riff", "Rooftop", "Snow Outside", and "Belly Belly Nice"—were all played on the band's 2012 summer tour. During the week leading up to the album's release, it was available to stream for free on iTunes. The album's title was taken from a lyric in "The Riff": "Sitting in a box/away from the world out there", which, according to Matthews, relates to the idea that "we are born and die alone" and that "our body is our box".

=== Commercial performance ===
The album debuted at No. 1 on Billboard 200 with album sales of 266,000 in its first week, becoming the band's sixth consecutive album to top the chart. By the end of December 2012, the album had sold 458,000 copies. The album also peaked at the top of Billboard's Top Rock Albums chart, and reached No. 3 in Canada.

"Mercy" was released as the album's lead single on July 16. It became a number-one hit on the Billboard Adult Alternative Airplay chart, and also reached No. 95 on the Hot 100 and No. 30 on the Hot Rock & Alternative Songs chart. The second single, "If Only", was also successful on the AAA chart, reaching number 11.

=== Critical reception ===
Professional ratings
Aggregate scores
Source	Rating
Metacritic	77/100
Review scores
Source	Rating
AllMusic	4/5 stars
Billboard	78/100
Classic Rock	4/5 stars
Consequence of Sound	3.5/5 stars
Entertainment Weekly	B
Evening Standard	4/5 stars
Rolling Stone	3.5/5 stars

Away from the World received a positive reception from critics. Billboard awarded the album four stars out of five, and called the band "as intriguing and adventurous now as it was when the Lillywhite-produced Under the Table and Dreaming came out [in 1994]." Rolling Stone praised Lillywhite's production and the interplay between band members, highlighting the album's fusion of "New Orleans R&B, lithe jazz fusion and nimbly driving jam rock". Megan Ritt of Consequence also gave praise to Lillywhite's production and the album's simplified sound, saying "despite having more players in studio than ever, DMB manages to sound stripped down — and more like itself than it has in a long time." Ritt considered primarily acoustic tracks such as "Sweet" and "Belly Full" to be among the album's highlights, saying that their stripped-back arrangements "unearth a simple truth: these are genuine craftsmen." Writing for The Boston Globe, Scott McLennan singled out album opener "Broken Things" and "The Riff" as highlights, praising the former's "tension-building contrast between desire and darkness" and feeling the latter "wends through fears and hopes and ultimately reveals the breadth of the band’s prowess".

Classic Rock praised "Mercy"'s "tender John Martyn soul", while saying "The Riff" "merits its title" and referring to "If Only" as "just lovely". AllMusic's Stephen Thomas Erlewine also gave the album a rating of four stars out of five. Erlewine felt "there's no denying he's the best producer for the band", commending him for "articulating [the band's] elasticity with clarity and reigning in their excesses." He praised the album's diversity, saying it contains "a little of everything that the Dave Matthews Band does, condensed to a relatively tight 53 minutes", and summed it up as "a rare thing: a return to form lacking an ounce of nostalgia".

The album was listed at No. 29 on Rolling Stone's list of the top 50 albums of 2012, saying its "political entreaties made for some of 2012's best GOTV rock." The Chicago Tribune also included the album in their list of the best releases of the year.

== Track listing ==
No.	Title	Writer(s)	Length
1.	"Broken Things"	David J. Matthews; John Alagía	3:49
2.	"Belly Belly Nice"	Matthews; Rashawn Ross	3:53
3.	"Mercy"	Matthews	4:29
4.	"Gaucho"	Stefan Lessard; Matthews; Tim Reynolds; Ross	4:26
5.	"Sweet"	Matthews	4:12
6.	"The Riff"	Matthews; Ross	5:36
7.	"Belly Full"	Matthews; Alagía	1:44
8.	"If Only"	Matthews	5:38
9.	"Rooftop"	Matthews	4:12
10.	"Snow Outside"	Carter Beauford; Lessard; Matthews; Boyd Tinsley; Jeff Coffin; Reynolds; Ross	6:12
11.	"Drunken Soldier"	Beauford; Lessard; Matthews; Tinsley; Coffin; Reynolds; Ross	9:48
Total length:			53:59

== Personnel ==
Dave Matthews Band

- Carter Beauford – drums, percussion, background vocals
- Stefan Lessard – bass guitar, Rhodes
- Dave Matthews – guitar, piano, lead vocals
- Boyd Tinsley – violin
- Tim Reynolds – electric and acoustic guitars
- Rashawn Ross – trumpet, bass trumpet, flugelhorn, keyboards, background vocals
- Jeff Coffin – soprano saxophone, tenor saxophone, baritone saxophone, flute, alto flute

Guest musicians

- Roger Smith – Hammond organ (track 8)
- Youth Co-Op Choir – background vocals (track 4)

Production

- Steve Lillywhite – producer, mixing (tracks 5, 7, 10)
- John Alagía – co-producer (tracks 1, 3, 9), additional recording
- Daniel Piscina – mixing (track 9 and iTunes bonus live mixes)
- Floyd Reitsma – engineer, mixing (tracks 5, 7, 10)
- Lars Fox – Pro Tools engineer
- Steven Aguilar – assistant engineer
- Michael H. Brauer – mixing
- Ryan Gilligan – mix assistant and Pro Tools engineer
- Justin Armstrong – additional engineering
- Ted Jensen – mastering

== Charts ==
=== Weekly charts ===
Chart (2012)	Peak position
Canadian Albums (Billboard)	3
Dutch Albums (Album Top 100)	90
US Billboard 200	1
US Top Rock Albums (Billboard)	1

=== Year-end charts ===
Chart (2012)	Position
US Billboard 200	58
US Top Rock Albums (Billboard)	13
