= Trax (nightclub) =

Nightclub in Charlottesville, Virginia

Coordinates: 38°1′53.2″N 78°29′46.4″W

Trax, later known as Crossroads, was a nightclub in Charlottesville, Virginia most notable for being a frequent gig for Dave Matthews Band during their early years. The band first played at the club a few months after forming in 1991. Because their local and regional popularity grew, they secured a standing gig at every Tuesday night from late 1992 through the end of 1993. The band became a national touring act on the verge of mainstream stardom by early 1994, so they only played at the club four times after 1993.

Trax was featured briefly in the 1991 movie True Colors.

Trax originally was an industrial building adjacent to the CSX train tracks (thus the name). When it changed hands in the early mid-1990s, it was briefly known as Crossroads. The building also housed a country and western nightclub called Max. The complex was located along 11th Street SW near the University of Virginia and also included John Hornsby's original Music Resource Center for kids. With a capacity of around 900 people, Trax played host to John Prine, Arlo Guthrie, Bill Monroe, Taj Majal, Cinderella (band), Seven Mary Three, Juliana Hatfield, Widespread Panic, Sun Ra, George Clinton, Ziggy Marley, 311, Sonic Youth, Mudhoney, Pavement, My Bloody Valentine, They Might Be Giants, The Pixies, The Ramones, Public Enemy, De La Soul, The Black Crowes, Southern Culture on the Skids, Phish, Shawn Colvin, and other popular acts. Before Ratdog, Bob Weir of the Grateful Dead and Rob Wasserman played there as part of a Native American benefit organized by musician Pete Sears. The benefit also featured Jorma Kaukonen, Michael Falzarano, Pete Sears, Chris Whitley and Dave Matthews. But after the rise of the legal drinking age and the decision by operator Coran Capshaw to spend more time with Dave Matthews Band, whom he managed, the venue fell into a slump. It was taken over by David Fisher in the early nineties for a brief period and then experienced a resurgence under Dana Murphy in the mid nineties, nurturing an ever growing music scene at the time. Earth to Andy frequented the club as well as My Dog Lucy, whose former guitarist would later join Daughtry. Trax closed around the middle of 2001 and was demolished at the end of the following year.
