= Steve Morell =

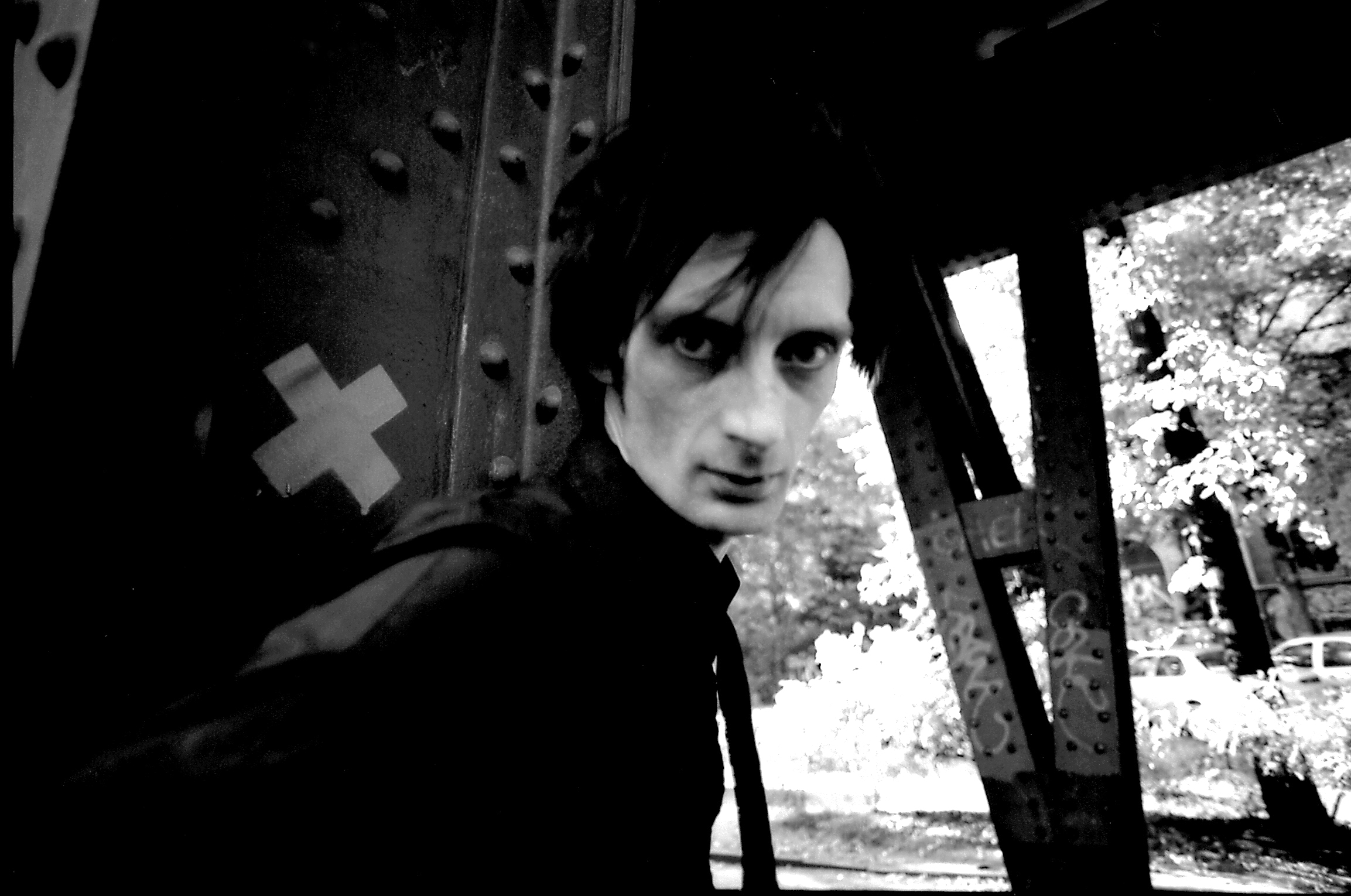

Steve Morell (born Stephan Kraus on 19 April 1967 in Fulda, Germany) is a German musician, male model and music producer.

== Life ==
Morell's roots were in the punk scene of London. Against his family's wishes he relocated to Frankfurt in 1984, and then to Berlin where he founded the music label Pale Music International. He was one of the most important and influential underground-musicians of Berlin and had the unofficial title as "King of Underground". In 2017 he survived skin cancer and started his model career. He was featured in Vogue Homme, Elle and other fashion magazines and got roles in music videos and movies. Morell lives in Berlin and London.
