= Mercy (Dave Matthews Band song) =

Single by Dave Matthews Band

from the album Away from the World
- B-side: "Gaucho"
- Released: July 16, 2012
- Genre: Alternative rock
- Length: 4:28
- Label: RCA
- Songwriter(s): Dave Matthews
- Producer(s): Steve Lillywhite

Dave Matthews Band singles chronology
"You and Me" (2009)	"Mercy" (2012)	"If Only" (2012)

Music video
- "Mercy" on YouTube

"Mercy" is a song by American rock band Dave Matthews Band. Written by frontman Dave Matthews, it was released as the lead single from the band's eighth studio album Away from the World on July 16, 2012.

== Release ==
Dave Matthews debuted "Mercy" solo on Late Night with Jimmy Fallon on April 24, 2012, and Dave Matthews Band released the studio version on July 16, 2012.

It was performed during Hand in Hand: A Benefit for Hurricane Relief by Matthews himself in 2017 and also during the March for Our Lives in Seattle, Washington in 2018.

== Charts ==
=== Weekly charts ===
Chart (2012)	Peak position
Japan (Japan Hot 100)	73
US Billboard Hot 100	95
US Hot Rock & Alternative Songs (Billboard)	30

=== Year-end charts ===
Chart (2012)	Position
US Hot Rock Songs (Billboard)	98
