= Big Whiskey & the GrooGrux King =

Studio album by Dave Matthews Band
- Released: June 2, 2009
- Recorded: November 2007 – February 2009
- Studios: Haunted Hollow (Charlottesville, Virginia); Studio Litho (Seattle, Washington); Studio X (Seattle); Piety Studio (New Orleans, Louisiana); Electric Lady Studios (New York City); Lightning Sound Studios (Hidden Hills, California); Capitol Studios (Hollywood, Los Angeles)
- Genre: Alternative rock
- Length: 54:30 (Main CD); 16:48 (Super Deluxe Bonus CD)
- Label: RCA
- Producer: Rob Cavallo

Dave Matthews Band chronology
Stand Up (2005)	Big Whiskey & the GrooGrux King (2009)	Away from the World (2012)

Singles from Big Whiskey & the GrooGrux King
- 1. "Funny the Way It Is" Released: April 14, 2009; 2. "Why I Am" Released: July 13, 2009; 3. "You and Me" Released: August 24, 2009

Big Whiskey & the GrooGrux King is the seventh studio album by the American rock band Dave Matthews Band, which was released by RCA Records on June 2, 2009.

It is the band's first release since the death of saxophonist LeRoi Moore, and it is their last album to feature Moore. Guitarist Tim Reynolds played on the album, marking his first recording with DMB since 1998's Before These Crowded Streets. Rashawn Ross makes his first appearance on a DMB studio album since joining as a regular touring member in 2006 as well as Jeff Coffin, who has taken Moore's role since June 2008. The album was the first to be produced by Rob Cavallo.

The album debuted at number one on the Billboard 200, selling 424,000 copies in its first week of release. This marked the group's fifth consecutive studio album to open with a sales week of at least 400,000 copies.

Exactly six months after its release, Big Whiskey & the GrooGrux King was nominated for two Grammy Awards: Best Rock Album and Album of the Year, but lost to Green Day's 21st Century Breakdown and Taylor Swift's Fearless, respectively.

On September 4, 2026, the band, unannounced, performed all 13 tracks from the album in order during a show at The Gorge Amphitheatre. This did not include the hidden track "#35" that was on the released album.

== Recording ==
Work on the album began in November 2007 at Haunted Hollow in Charlottesville, Virginia. Production moved to Seattle, Washington in February 2008 at Studio Litho, and continued from October to December 2008 at Studio X. In January 2009 the sessions that would complete the album began at Piety Street Studio in New Orleans, Louisiana.

The album was originally slated to be released on April 14, 2009, but it was moved to June 2. The title of the album was announced on February 26, 2009.

The album cover artwork and all the liner note artwork was hand drawn by Dave Matthews. Matthews said he "had good fun making it." The cover illustration featured a drawing of his recently deceased bandmate LeRoi Moore. Dave's original idea for the cover was not to depict LeRoi but to simply illustrate a Mardi Gras scene. As Dave worked on the art he found that the face of the character in the center gradually began looking more and more like LeRoi until it morphed into his likeness.

The album cover was fully revealed on April 13. In the previous four days, sections of the cover were slowly revealed; the cover was divided into nine pieces and revealed one piece a day for the first several days, and then several pieces the last two days before the final reveal. The art was ultimately revealed by shuffling the pieces in a digital sliding puzzle, where the person has to rearrange the puzzle correctly. Once correct, the center piece was revealed to show the full picture.

== Title ==
In an April 2009 interview with MTV, Dave Matthews and Carter Beauford described the origins of the two-pronged name of the album.

Beauford described the word "GrooGrux" as not only a nickname for LeRoi Moore, but also a nickname for himself, Tim Reynolds, and former collaborator Tim Wicks. Beauford said the made-up word was used to describe the "vibe" and "energy" of their "wild-sounding rhythms" they made when they started playing music together. Beauford also mentioned that Matthews, bassist Stefan Lessard and violinist Boyd Tinsley were now graduates of "The GrooGrux Academy."

Matthews said the origins of "Big Whiskey" came from a chance encounter with a local New Orleans drunk during a photo shoot for the new album. When the band was shooting promotional photos outside of Preservation Hall in the French Quarter of New Orleans, they encountered a local man playing harmonica who was asking tourists for money so he could buy "a big whiskey." Lessard gave Matthews a $20 bill to hand the man, who walked off in celebration. Trumpet player Rashawn Ross then suggested the phrase for the title of the album, which Matthews liked because people would not have to call the album by the more difficult to say "GrooGrux".

== Critical reception ==
Professional ratings
Aggregate scores
Source	Rating
Metacritic	67/100
Review scores
Source	Rating
AllMusic	4.5/5 stars
The A.V. Club	C
Chicago Tribune	3/4 stars
Entertainment Weekly	B
Los Angeles Times	3/4 stars
Mojo	3/5 stars
Q	3/5 stars
Rolling Stone	4/5 stars
Spin	7/10
USA Today	3.5/4 stars

Big Whiskey and the GrooGrux King received generally positive reviews from music critics. At Metacritic, which assigns a normalized rating out of 100 to reviews from mainstream critics, the album received an average score of 67, based on 15 reviews, which indicates "generally favorable reviews".

Rolling Stone called Big Whiskey and the GrooGrux King the band's "best album yet" on the cover of their June 2009 issue, and editor David Fricke awarded the album a rating of four out of five stars.

== Track listing ==
No.	Title	Writer(s)	Length
1.	"Grux"	Beauford; Lessard; Matthews; Moore; Tinsley	1:11
2.	"Shake Me Like a Monkey"	Beauford; Lessard; Matthews; Moore; Tinsley; Ross	4:00
3.	"Funny the Way It Is"	Beauford; Lessard; Matthews; Moore; Tinsley; Reynolds	4:28
4.	"Lying in the Hands of God"	Beauford; Lessard; Matthews; Moore; Tinsley; Reynolds	5:13
5.	"Why I Am"	Beauford; Lessard; Matthews; Moore; Tinsley; Reynolds	3:53
6.	"Dive In"	Beauford; Matthews	4:26
7.	"Spaceman"	Beauford; Lessard; Matthews	4:08
8.	"Squirm"	Beauford; Matthews	5:32
9.	"Alligator Pie (Note: Also listed as "Alligator Pie (Cockadile)" in the liner notes.)"	Beauford; Lessard; Matthews	4:00
10.	"Seven"	Beauford; Lessard; Matthews; Moore; Reynolds	4:17
11.	"Time Bomb"	Matthews	3:59
12.	"Baby Blue"	Beauford; Lessard; Matthews; Moore; Tinsley; Reynolds	3:41
13.	"You & Me" (includes the hidden instrumental track "#35")	Matthews	5:40

The track listing was made available on April 14 on the Dave Matthews Band website, and the first single from the album, "Funny the Way It Is", was made available for free download on the Dave Matthews Band website for the week of 14 April 2009.

== Little Red Bird and bonus songs ==
=== Little Red Bird ===
With the super deluxe boxed set version of the album, the band included Little Red Bird, a four-track EP of songs that were recorded during the sessions, but were not included on the final cut.

No.	Title	Writer(s)	Length
1.	"#27"	Matthews	5:03
2.	"Beach Ball"	Matthews	4:11
3.	"Little Red Bird"	Matthews	2:53
4.	"Write a Song"	Beauford, Lessard, Matthews, Moore, Tinsley	3:50

=== European CD bonus songs ===
The European cut of Big Whiskey featured two extra songs after "You and Me": "Write a Song", from the Little Red Bird EP, and "Corn Bread", a song the band had been playing live for two tours. The studio version of "Corn Bread" features guest banjoist Danny Barnes.

No.	Title	Writer(s)	Length
1.	"Write a Song"	Beauford, Lessard, Matthews, Moore, Tinsley	3:50
2.	"Corn Bread"	Matthews, Mark Batson	4:54

"Corn Bread" and "#27" are the only released songs from the sessions that the band had played live before the sessions began.

=== iTunes bonus songs ===
iTunes released two versions of Big Whiskey: a standard version containing the 13 tracks from the album plus a live version of "Corn Bread", and a more expensive iTunes pass. The pass included videos, exclusive live tracks, and a few songs from the album that were released ahead of the official release date. The pass was active from April 21, 2009 until September 22, 2009, and tracks were automatically downloaded as they became available. On September 9, with the release of iTunes 9, came the Big Whiskey LP, where one can play the music while reading the lyrics, as well as new art by Dave Matthews.

No.	Title	Release date	Length
1.	"Funny the Way It Is" (lead single)	April 21	4:29
2.	"Dave Talking About the Art" (video; included album cover art in .pdf file)	April 28	0:55
3.	"Big Whiskey & the GrooGrux King" (Trailer)	April 28	1:53
4.	"Scenes from Big Whiskey, Pt. 1" (video)	May 5	4:10
5.	"Scenes from Big Whiskey, Pt. 2" (video)	May 12	7:36
6.	"Shake Me Like a Monkey"	May 19	4:00
7.	"Lying in the Hands of God"	May 26	5:13
8.	"Cornbread (Live)" (released with the album)	June 2	5:32
9.	"Funny the Way It Is" (music video)	June 16	4:27
10.	"Scenes from Big Whiskey, Pt. 3" (video)	June 23	5:08
11.	"Scenes from Big Whiskey, Pt. 4" (video)	June 30	12:11
12.	"Write a Song" (bonus song)	June 30	3:50
13.	"Shake Me Like a Monkey" (Live At the Saratoga Performing Arts Center, 6/13/09)	July 28	4:04
14.	"Alligator Pie" (Live at Beacon Theatre, 6/1/09)	August 4	4:22
15.	"Beach Ball" (Live at Cynthia Woods Mitchell Pavilion, 5/1/09)	August 11	6:36
16.	"Why I Am" (music video)	August 25	4:04
17.	"You & Me" (Acoustic version)	September 1	4:19
18.	"Lying in the Hands of God" (Live at SPAC, Saratoga Springs, 6/12/09)	September 1	6:27
19.	"Time Bomb" (Live at Comcast Theatre, Hartford, 6/6/09)	September 1	5:29
20.	"You & Me" (Live At SPAC, Saratoga Springs, 6/12/09)	September 1	4:34
21.	"iTunes LP: Big Whiskey and the GrooGrux King" (interactive iTunes LP)	September 9	n/a

== Personnel ==
Dave Matthews Band

- Carter Beauford – drums, percussion
- Stefan Lessard – bass guitar
- Dave Matthews – guitar, vocals
- LeRoi Moore – saxophone (Note: Moore died during pre-production of the album)
- Boyd Tinsley – violin

Featured musicians

- Tim Reynolds – guitar
- Rashawn Ross – trumpet
- Jeff Coffin – saxophone

Additional musicians

- Danny Barnes – banjo
- Rob Cavallo – occasional organ and piano
- Joe Lawlor – additional guitar
- Jamie Muhoberac – keyboards, organ
- Tim Pierce – additional guitar
- Roger Joseph Manning Jr. – keyboards
- Mr. Okra – produce vendor
- Strings
  - Joel Derouin – concertmaster
  - Charlie Bisharat, Jacqueline Brand, Roberto Cani, Susan Chatman, Mario de Leon, Alan Grunfeld, Gerardo Hilera, Sharon Jackson, Natalie Leggett, Sid Page, Alyssa Park, Vladimir Polimatidi, Michele Richards, Philip Vaiman, Josefina Vergara, Laurence Greenfield, Miwako Watanabe – violin
  - Andrew Duckles (principal), Robert Brophy, Victoria Miskolczy, Karen Elaine, Matt Funes, Darrin McCann – viola
  - Steve Richards (principal), Chris Ermacoff, Suzie Katayama (contractor), Armen Ksajikian, Dane Little, George Kim Scholes, Rudolph Stein – cello
  - Nico Abondolo (principal), Timothy Eckert – bass

Production

- Rob Cavallo – producer
- Doug McKean – engineer
- Lars Fox, Dan Chase – Pro Tools engineers
- Wesley Fontenot, Rob Evans, Floyd Reitsma, Sam Hofstedt, Josh Evans, Paul Suarez, Steve Rea, Russ Waugh, Aaron Walk – assistant engineers
- David Campbell – string arrangements and conducting (6, 8, 12)
- Chris Lord-Alge – mixing (1, 2)
- Doug McKean – mixing (3–13)
- Keith Armstrong, Nik Karpen – assistant mix engineers (1, 2)
- Brad Townsend – additional mix engineering (1, 2)
- Ted Jensen – mastering
- Henry Luniewski – drum tech
- Jerry Johnson – drum and saxophone tech
- Craig Baker – guitar tech
- Erik Porter – bass and violin tech
- Dave Matthews – illustration and art direction

== Charts ==
Chart performance for Big Whiskey & the GrooGrux King
Chart (2009)	Peak position
Australian Albums (ARIA)	64
Canadian Albums (Billboard)	2
Dutch Albums (Album Top 100)	99
German Albums (Offizielle Top 100)	74
Portuguese Albums (AFP)	24
UK Albums (Official Charts)	59
US Billboard 200	1
