= Why I Am (song) =

Single by Dave Matthews Band

from the album Big Whiskey & the GrooGrux King
- Released: July 13, 2009
- Genre: Alternative rock
- Length: 3:54
- Label: RCA
- Songwriters: Carter Beauford, Stefan Lessard, Dave Matthews, LeRoi Moore, Tim Reynolds, Boyd Tinsley
- Producer: Rob Cavallo

Dave Matthews Band singles chronology
"Funny the Way It Is" (2009)	"Why I Am" (2009)	"You & Me" (2009)

"Why I Am" is the second single from American rock band Dave Matthews Band's album Big Whiskey & the GrooGrux King. The song is a tribute to former band member LeRoi Moore, who died on August 19, 2008. The song discusses death and the urgency of living. It was written before Moore's death and features his playing on it.

The song debuted live on April 14, 2009, at Madison Square Garden, alongside two other album songs, "Funny the Way It Is" (the first single) and "Spaceman". The song was performed by the band on The Today Show, Late Show with David Letterman, The Tonight Show with Conan O'Brien, Late Night with Jimmy Fallon, Austin City Limits and Ellen, as well as Fuse Presents..., a show on the US television channel Fuse, which occurred on the same day as the release of Big Whiskey and the GrooGrux King (June 2, 2009).

A music video for the song was recorded live in London, England, and made its American debut on August 14, 2009, via MySpace.

== Charts ==
Chart (2009)	Peak position
US Adult Alternative Airplay (Billboard)	2
US Hot Rock & Alternative Songs (Billboard)	34
