= Funny the Way It Is =

Single by Dave Matthews Band

from the album Big Whiskey & the GrooGrux King
- Released: April 21, 2009
- Genre: Alternative rock
- Length: 4:28 (album version); 4:00 (radio edit)
- Label: RCA
- Songwriters: Carter Beauford; Stefan Lessard; Dave Matthews; LeRoi Moore; Tim Reynolds; Boyd Tinsley
- Producer: Rob Cavallo

Dave Matthews Band singles chronology
"Work It Out" (2006)	"Funny the Way It Is" (2009)	"Why I Am" (2009)

Music video
- "Funny the Way It Is” on YouTube

"Funny the Way It Is" is the first single from Dave Matthews Band's album Big Whiskey & the GrooGrux King. Matthews said that it "talks about the world of opposites that we are in." The single reached number 37 on the Billboard Hot 100 (their fourth and final top 40 hit to date), number 22 on the Modern Rock Tracks (their first song on that chart since 2002's "Grey Street"), and number 17 on the Hot Digital Songs chart in its first week of release. It is also their first number one on the AAA chart since 2002's "Where Are You Going".

The song was also released as a free download on the band's website.

== Music video ==
A music video was released in June 2009, shortly after the album was released. It was directed by Fenton Williams and produced by Ryan Gall and Jeff Crane of Filament Productions.

== Track listing ==
CD version

1. "Funny the Way It Is" – 4:28

Vinyl version

1. "Funny the Way It Is" – 4:28
2. "#27" – 5:01

Promo CDS

1. "Funny the Way It Is" (radio edit) – 4:00

Promo Only released the shortened radio edit on their May 2009 Modern Rock compilation. The radio edit omits a verse towards the end of the song.

== Charts ==
Chart (2009)	Peak position
US Billboard Hot 100	37
US Adult Alternative Airplay (Billboard)	1
US Adult Pop Airplay (Billboard)	21
US Alternative Airplay (Billboard)	22
US Hot Rock & Alternative Songs (Billboard)	19
