= Reverb (organization) =

American environmental organization

Reverb is a non-profit environmental organization that aims to educate and engage musicians and their fans to promote environmental sustainability. It was founded by American environmentalist Lauren Sullivan and her musician husband, Guster guitarist/vocalist Adam Gardner.

The organization's services include carbon neutral concerts and venues, biodiesel for vehicles and generators, waste reduction, biodegradable catering products; recycling, green bus supplies and cleaners, energy efficiency, green contract rider, environmentally sustainable merchandise, green sponsorship, and educational outreach.

Reverb provides learning experiences designed to engage volunteers with local nonprofit groups. Customers can also donate money for environmental causes and receive a sticker.

The group has worked with artists including Drake, Jason Mraz, The Dead, Phish, Dave Matthews Band, John Mayer, Harry Styles, Guster, Barenaked Ladies, Maroon 5, Lilith Fair, and Billie Eilish.
