= You and Me (Dave Matthews Band song) =

Single by Dave Matthews Band

from the album Big Whiskey & the GrooGrux King
- Released: August 24, 2009
- Genre: Alternative rock
- Length: 5:40 (album version); 4:20 (radio edit)
- Label: RCA
- Songwriter: Dave Matthews
- Producer: Rob Cavallo

Dave Matthews Band singles chronology
"Why I Am" (2009)	"You and Me" (2009)	"Mercy" (2012)

Music video
- "You & Me" on YouTube

"You and Me" is the third single by American rock band Dave Matthews Band from their seventh studio album Big Whiskey & the GrooGrux King (2009). It was written by Dave Matthews, produced by Rob Cavallo, and released in 2009.

The song peaked at number 32 on the US Billboard Hot Rock Songs chart, and at number 57 on the US Billboard Hot 100. It also peaked at number two on the US Billboard Adult Alternative Songs chart. In October 2010, Billboard ranked the song as the year's number three "Triple A" song, a listing of the Adult Alternative songs played the most on American radio.

== Background ==
Matthews wrote the lyrics in New York while crossing Saratoga Lake on a boat in mid-August 2007. The song was recorded in early 2008 and was one of the earliest songs finished for Big Whiskey.

In an interview with Evan Serpick of Rolling Stone, Matthews said that "You and Me" was "sort of like a birth song, that 'We can do anything' song"; and that it is intended to be inspiring, as "a little pick me up" at the end of album.

== Composition ==
"You and Me" is in the key of G Major in common time with a tempo of 76 beats per minute. Matthews' vocals span from D_{4} to F#_{5}.

== Release ==
Customers who purchased the iTunes Pass for the album received two bonus versions of "You and Me" on September 1, 2009. One was an acoustic version of the song recorded in the studio, and the other was a live version recorded June 12, 2009, at Saratoga Performing Arts Center, New York.

== Live performances ==
The song was played live at Comcast Theatre on June 6, 2009, in Hartford, Connecticut, four days after the album's release.

Dave Matthews Band appeared on Ellen on September 16, 2009, to play an outdoor concert on the Warner Bros. lot in Burbank, California. During the broadcast, the band played "You and Me".

The band performed the song live at the 52nd Annual Grammy Awards in January 2010.

== Track listing ==
1. You and Me - 5:40
2. Você e Eu (You and Me) [feat. Ivete Sangalo.] - 4:50

== Charts ==
Chart (2009–10)	Peak position
Canada (Canadian Hot 100)	53
Japan Hot 100 (Billboard)	97
US Billboard Hot 100	57
US Billboard Adult Alternative Songs	2
US Billboard Adult Top 40	30
US Billboard Hot Rock Songs	32
US Billboard Digital Songs	33
US Billboard Rock Digital Songs	4

=== All-time charts ===
Chart (1995–2021)	Position
US Adult Alternative Airplay (Billboard)	58
