= Rashawn Ross =

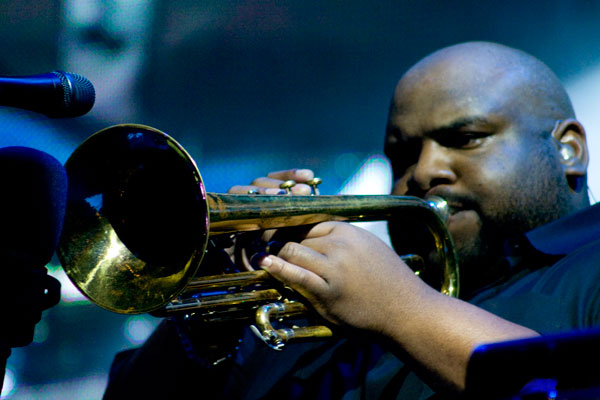
- Ross playing in Buenos Aires, Argentina

Background information
- Born: January 16, 1979 (age 47); St. Thomas, US Virgin Islands
- Genres: Funk; rock; jazz; hip hop; gospel; country
- Occupation: Trumpeter
- Instruments: Trumpet, piano
- Years active: 2000–present

Rashawn Ross (born January 16, 1979) is an American trumpeter and arranger. His contributions to the Dave Matthews Band, first as a touring member and now a full-time member, have garnered him visibility. Ross is an accomplished session musician. Ross has worked with artists in many different genres of music including funk, pop, rock, jazz, hip hop, gospel, and country music. Some of the notable artists whom Ross has supported include Yerba Buena, Soulive, Lettuce, The 1975, and DJ Quik.

== Career ==
Ross attended the Berklee College of Music from 1996–2000. On June 18, 2005, Ross first appeared on stage with the Dave Matthews Band, performing "Louisiana Bayou" from the album Stand Up. He continued to appear sporadically throughout 2005, with his workload increasing as the tour progressed. Initially, he joined the band on the road for the December 2005 final run of the tour, culminating in a 12-song appearance at the final stop of the tour. In 2006 Ross joined the band full-time on the road, performing at all full band tour dates of the year, as well as contributing backing vocals as his contributions increased by the tour's end. Ross has appeared at every performance since 2006 as trumpet player and background vocals. As of August 2025 Ross has appeared with the Dave Matthews Band for 1067 shows.

== Session work ==
Some of the other artists he has performed with include: The Fugees, Maceo Parker, Christian McBride, Chaka Khan, Stevie Wonder, Willie Nelson, The Edge, Rodney Jerkins, Christina Milan, Fred Hammond, Sean Paul, Roy Hargrove, Nicholas Payton, Questlove, Common, Pharoah Monch, Mark Batson, Robert Randolph, Doug E. Fresh, B Real, Chingy, Nate Dogg, Kim Burrell, Richard Smallwood, Kelly Price, James Hall, Meshell Ndegeocello, The String Cheese Incident, MAGIC GIANT, Baaba Maal, Taj Mahal, Warren Haynes, Lettuce, Mike Green, Femi Kuti, Ariana Grande, The 1975, John Mayer and Lady Gaga.

== Discography ==
=== Soulive ===
- Break Out (2005)

=== With the Dave Matthews Band ===
==== Studio ====
- Big Whiskey and the GrooGrux King (2009)
- Away from the World (2012)
- Come Tomorrow (2018)
- Walk Around the Moon (2023)

==== Live ====
- Weekend on the Rocks (2005)
- The Best of What's Around Vol. 1 (2006)
- Live Trax Vol. 06 (2006)
- Live at Piedmont Park (2007)
- Live Trax vol. 09 (2007)
- Live Trax vol. 10 (2007)
- Live Trax vol. 11 (2008)
- Live Trax vol. 13 (2008)
- Live Trax vol. 14 (2008)
- Live at Mile High Music Festival (2008)
- Live Trax vol. 15 (2009)
- Europe 2009 (2009)
- Live Trax vol. 19 (2010)
- Live in New York City (2010)
- Live In Atlantic City
- Live at Wrigley Field (2011)
- Live Trax vol. 22 (2012)
- Live Trax vol. 25 (2013)
- Live Trax vol. 26 (2013)
- Live Trax vol. 27 (2013)
- Live Trax vol. 28 (2013)
- Live Trax vol. 29 (2014)
- Live Trax vol. 32 (2014)
- Live Trax vol. 35 (2015)
- Live Trax vol. 36 (2015)
- Live Trax vol. 42 (2017)
- Live Trax vol. 44 (2017)

=== As a guest ===
- Ninja Sex Party - "Smooth Talkin'"
