= Crash into Me =

1996 single by Dave Matthews Band

Single by Dave Matthews Band

from the album Crash
- Released: October 29, 1996
- Studio: Bearsville (Woodstock, New York)
- Length: 5:16 (album version); 4:15 (radio edit)
- Label: RCA
- Songwriter: Dave Matthews
- Producer: Steve Lillywhite

Dave Matthews Band singles chronology
"So Much to Say" (1996)	"Crash into Me" (1996)	"Two Step" (1997)

"Crash into Me" is a song by American rock group Dave Matthews Band. It was released on October 29, 1996, as the third single from their second album, Crash (1996). It reached number two on the US Billboard Triple-A chart and number 30 in Canada. The song was nominated for Best Rock Performance by a Duo or Group with Vocals at the 1998 Grammy Awards.

== Background and writing ==
On VH1 Storytellers, Matthews stated that the song was written from the perspective of a Peeping Tom watching a girl at night through her bedroom window. Dave Matthews also described the song at the Pinkpop Festival as "a nice song about sex, it's begging for sex."

== Music video ==
The music video was directed by Dean Karr and premiered on November 12, 1996. The video depicts the band members in a forest setting dressed in forest dweller style clothing while surrounded by dancers who perform interpretively around them.

== Charts ==
=== Weekly charts ===
Chart (1997)	Peak position
Canada Top Singles (RPM)	30
Canada Adult Contemporary (RPM)	52
US Radio Songs (Billboard)	19
US Adult Alternative Airplay (Billboard)	2
US Adult Pop Airplay (Billboard)	9
US Alternative Airplay (Billboard)	7
US Pop Airplay (Billboard)	18

=== Year-end charts ===
Chart (1997)	Position
US Hot 100 Airplay (Billboard)	20
US Adult Top 40 (Billboard)	14
US Modern Rock Tracks (Billboard)	25
US Top 40/Mainstream (Billboard)	47
US Triple-A (Billboard)	2

== Cover versions ==
=== Stevie Nicks version ===
"Crash into Me"

Single by Stevie Nicks

from the album The Soundstage Sessions
- B-side: "Landslide" (orchestra version)
- Released: March 17, 2009
- Length: 5:33
- Label: Reprise
- Songwriter: David J. Matthews
- Producers: Joe Thomas, Stevie Nicks, Waddy Wachtel

Stevie Nicks singles chronology
"Stand Back" (2007)	"Crash into Me" (2009)	"Secret Love" (2011)

Stevie Nicks released "Crash into Me" as the first single from her album, The Soundstage Sessions, on March 17, 2009. Nicks has often referred to the song simply as "Crash", hence the single cover title.

==== Track listing ====
No.	Title	Length
1.	"Crash into Me"	5:33
2.	"Landslide" (orchestra version)	4:20

=== Darren Criss and Steve Aoki version ===
"Crash into Me"

Single by Darren Criss and Steve Aoki
- Released: July 12, 2019
- Genre: Electronic dance music
- Length: 3:46
- Label: Ultra
- Songwriters: Colden Grey, David John Matthews

In July 2019, Darren Criss and Steve Aoki released an EDM-style cover of "Crash Into Me." Darren Criss unveiled the song during a class at a gym in Los Angeles. He was excited to be able to work with an EDM pro like Aoki, having said in an interview with Billboard: "...before I had any access to Steve whatsoever, I was always like, 'Man, how the fuck would I pull this off?' So to be able to meet somebody of his pedigree who's exactly the kind of person who would be able to midwife this, it was great." The song was released on July 12, 2019, and peaked at number 12 on Billboard's Dance/Electronic Digital Song Sales chart.

== In popular culture ==
- "Crash into Me" appears in the NBC sitcoms Parks and Recreation and The Office.
- "Crash into Me" is featured prominently in the 2017 film Lady Bird. On the inclusion of the song, director Greta Gerwig stated, "I love Dave Matthews, and I feel like it's an incredibly romantic song and I always wanted to make out to that song and I never did."
