= Stefan Lessard =

21st-century American songwriter and guitarist

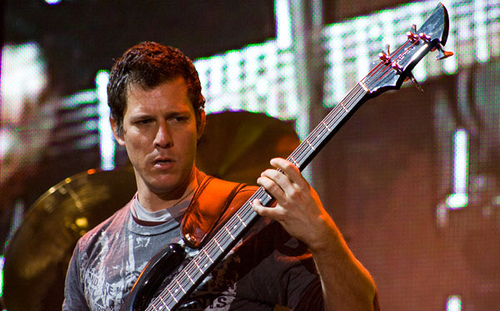
- Lessard performing in 2008

Background information
- Born: Stefan Kahil Lessard; June 4, 1974 (age 52); Anaheim, California
- Occupations: Musician; songwriter
- Instrument: Bass guitar
- Years active: 1991–present
- Member of: Dave Matthews Band; Yukon Kornelius
- Education: Tandem Friends School
- Board member of: Reverb
- Spouse: Josie Baucom (m. 1997–2004) Jaclyn Burton (m. 2005)
- Children: 5 (1 deceased)

Stefan Lessard (born June 4, 1974) is an American musician, best-known as the bassist for Dave Matthews Band, of which he is a founding member. He is also a member of the supergroup Yukon Kornelius.

== Life and career ==
Stefan Kahil Lessard was born on June 4, 1974, to musician parents. His father Ron was a professional bassist and graduated from Berklee College of Music two years after Stefan's birth. During Lessard's early life his family moved between the West and East Coasts several times before settling in Yogaville, an ashram in Virginia in 1984.

Lessard joined Dave Matthews Band at age 16, recommended to the band's guitarist and vocalist Dave Matthews by trumpeter and music teacher John D'earth. Lessard commenced studying jazz at Virginia Commonwealth University. However, due to the rising popularity of Dave Matthews Band, he ceased his studies.

=== Instruments ===
In addition to his typical bass guitar, Lessard also plays double bass and ukulele bass. Among the basses he has used are a 1957 Fender Precision Bass (for recording of Dave Matthews Band's 2023 album Walk Around the Moon), a custom Dingwall 6-string, Music Man StingRays (4- and 5-string), a Modulus fretless, and a Warwick Dolphin.

== Personal life ==
In 1996, Lessard's three-week-old daughter, Aslan, died of unknown causes. He married Josie Baucom in 1997; and they divorced in 2004. He then married Jaclyn Burton in 2005, with whom he has three daughters. In 2007, his home was destroyed by a fire. Lessard now resides in Laguna Beach, California, and he has a son and three daughters.

Lessard is a member of the advisory board of Reverb, a non-profit environmental organization.
