= Sisqó discography =

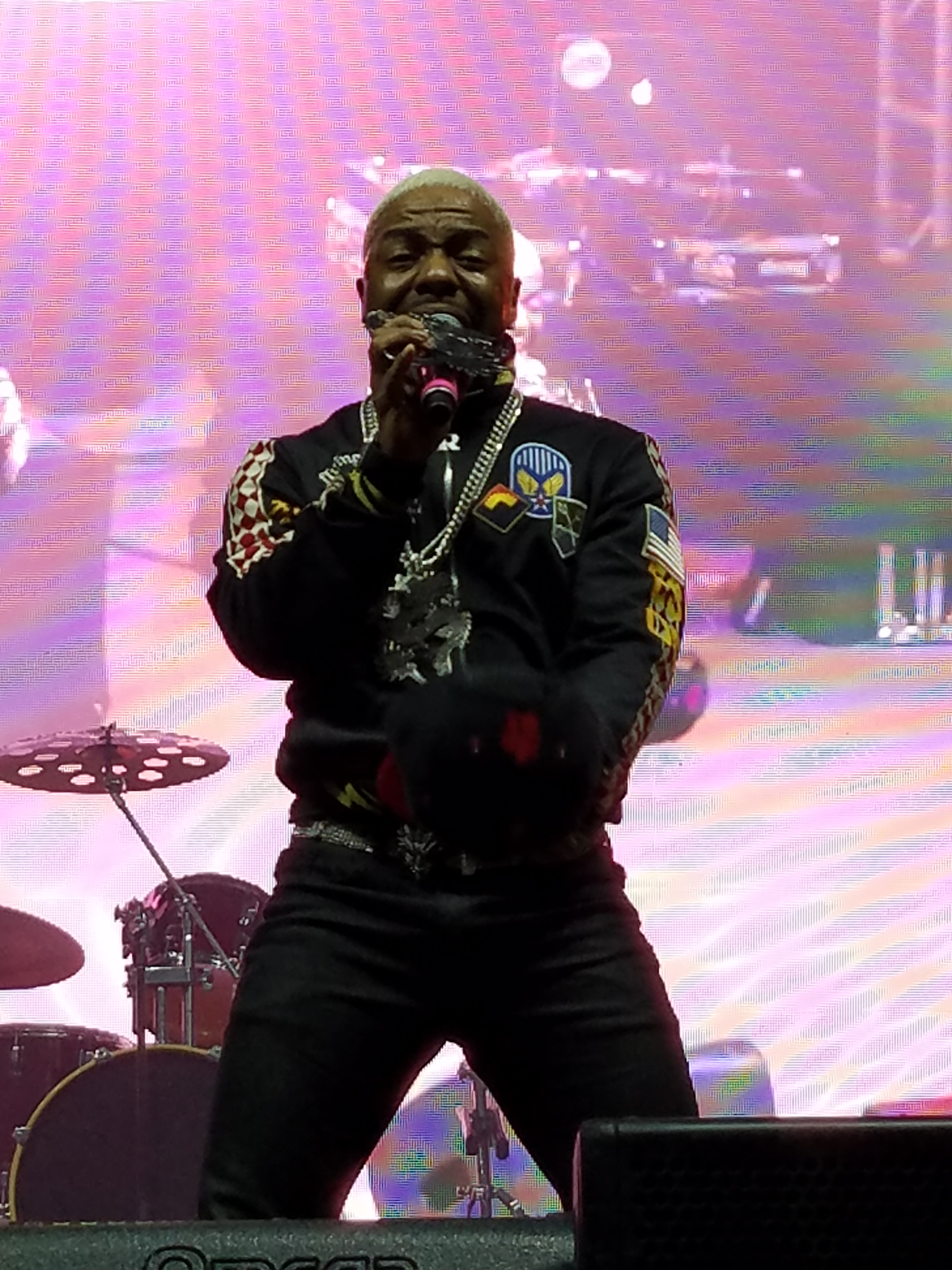
- Studio albums: 3
- EPs: 2
- Compilation albums: 2
- Singles: 12
- Music videos: 19

This is the discography documenting albums and singles released by American R&B singer Sisqó.

== Albums ==
=== Studio albums ===
Title	Album details	Peak chart positions										Certifications (sales threshold)
Title	Album details	US	US R&B	AUS	CAN	FRA	NZ	NOR	SWE	SWI	UK	Certifications (sales threshold)
Unleash the Dragon	Release date: November 30, 1999; Label: Def Soul	2	2	28	6	27	19	23	45	36	15	RIAA: 5× Platinum; ARIA: Gold; BPI: Gold; MC: 2× Platinum
Return of Dragon	Release date: June 19, 2001; Label: Def Soul	7	3	52	44	32	—	—	—	17	22	RIAA: Platinum; BPI: Silver
Last Dragon	Release date: February 10, 2015; Label: Dragon Music Group	—	—	—	—	—	—	—	—	—	—	

=== Compilation albums ===
Title	Album details	Peak chart positions	
Title	Album details	US	US R&B
Hits	Release date: October 11, 2005; Label: Def Soul Classics	72	22
The Best of Sisqó: 20th Century Masters – The Millennium Collection	Release date: January 1, 2006; Label: Def Soul/Island	—	—
"—" denotes releases that did not chart

== EPs ==
Title	EP details
Thong Song – Best Of	Release date: February 15, 2013; Label: X-Ray
Genesis EP	Release date: November 29, 2019; Label: Dragon Music Group

== Singles ==
=== As lead artist ===
Year	Title	Peak chart positions										Album
Year	Title	US	US R&B	AUS	FRA	GER	NLD	NZ	SWE	SWI	UK	Album
1999	"Got to Get It" (featuring Make It Hot)	40	12	28	—	48	36	50	—	—	14	Unleash the Dragon
2000	"Thong Song"	3	1	2	15	15	3	1	8	8	3	Unleash the Dragon
2000	"Unleash the Dragon" (featuring Beanie Sigel)	—	—	18	—	—	31	—	41	47	6	Unleash the Dragon
2000	"Incomplete"	1	1	28	—	51	51	—	—	—	13	Unleash the Dragon
2001	"Can I Live?" (featuring The Dragon Family)	—	72	100	—	87	—	—	—	—	—	Return of Dragon
2001	"Dance for Me"	—	—	40	91	55	6	—	31	10	6	Return of Dragon
2006	"Who's Ur Daddy?"	—	—	—	—	—	—	—	—	—	—	Non-album singles
2006	"Perfect Christmas"	—	—	—	—	—	—	—	—	—	—	Non-album singles
2014	"A-List" (featuring Waka Flocka Flame)	—	—	—	—	—	—	—	—	—	—	Last Dragon
2014	"L.I.P.S."	—	23	—	—	—	—	—	—	—	—	Last Dragon
2021	"La Thong" (featuring JD Pantoja)	—	—	—	—	—	—	—	—	—	—	Non-album singles
2022	"It's Up"	—	—	—	—	—	—	—	—	—	—	Non-album singles
"—" denotes releases that did not chart.

=== As featured artist ===
Year	Song	Chart positions			Album
Year	Song	US	AUS	GER	Album
1998	"It's All About Me" (Mýa featuring Sisqó)	6	—	—	Mýa
2000	"What These Bitches Want" ^{1} (DMX featuring Sisqó)	49	—	—	...And Then There Was X
2000	"How Many Licks?" (Lil' Kim featuring Sisqó)	75	57	58	The Notorious K.I.M.
2015	"Without You (Value)" (Jung Key, Gummy)	—	—	—	Non-album singles
2017	"Thong Song" (JCY featuring Sisqó)	—	—	—	Non-album singles
2019	"Absolutely" (The Funky Bunch featuring Sisqó)	—	—	—	Non-album singles
2020	"A-list (Remix)" (Speedy & Sisqó featuring Waka Flocka Flame)	—	—	—	Non-album singles
2020	"Secret Garden 2020" (Omar Wilson, Raheem DeVaughn, Shawn Stockman, Sisqó)	—	—	—	Non-album singles
2020	"Don Don (Remix)" (Daddy Yankee, Anuel AA, Kendo Kaponi feat. Sisqó)	—	—	—	Non-album singles

Note

- ^{1} Edited version titled "What You Want" or "What They Really Want"

== Guest appearances ==
List of non-single guest appearances, with other performing artists, showing year released and album name
Title	Year	Other performer(s)	Album
"I Don't Know"	1998	Queen Latifah	Order in the Court
"September"	2001	Vitamin C	Get Over It
"So Damn Hood"	2002	Crooked I	Hood Star
"So Damn Hood (Remix)"	2002	Crooked I, Juvenile	—N/a
"Da Song"	2003	Little Clayway, Da Kid, Rod Lee	Da Song – Single
"Love Is on My Mind (Higher)"	2003	Shawna, Baby Cham	Red Star Sounds Presents Def Jamaica
"Welcome to Bmore"	2003	Cooli Hi & the Crown Vic Click	Purple Haze Vol. 2
"Revolution"	2003	Cooli Hi & the Crown Vic Click	Purple Haze Vol. 2
"The Realest"	2005	Cooli Hi, Nokio, Mr. Butch & Make It Hott	Crown Victoria
"Sleep for Days"	2008	Cooli Hi	Crown Victoria - the Sequel
"See It to Believe It"	2013	Future, Test	FBG The Movie
"On the Floor"	2013	Lil' Mo	P.S. I Love Me: Reloaded Diva
"Give Me a Good Song"	2016	Marie Osmond	Music Is Medicine
"Church, Pt. 2"	2017	Mega Ran	Extra Credit

== Soundtrack appearances ==
List of songs with performers
Year	Title	Other performer(s)	Album
2000	"Thong Song (Remix)"	Foxy Brown	The Best R&B of 2000 Soulfood the Series
2000	"Thong Song (Remix) Uncensored"	Foxy Brown	Nutty Professor II: The Klumps soundtrack

== Music videos ==
List of music videos, with directors and artists
Title	Year	Director(s)	Artist(s)	Note(s)	Ref.
"It's All About Me"	1998	G. Thomas Ferguson, Haqq Islam	Mýa, Sisqó		
"Got to Get It"	1999	Hype Williams	Sisqó, Make It Hot		
"Thong Song"	2000	Joseph Kahn	Sisqó		
"Thong Song Uncensored"	2000	Little X	Sisqó, Foxy Brown		
"What You Want"	2000	Hype Williams	DMX, Sisqó		
"How Many Licks?"	2000	Francis Lawrence	Lil' Kim, Sisqó	Sisqó does not appear in the video	
"Unleash the Dragon"	2000	Martin Weisz	Sisqó, Make It Hot	Never broadcast on television	
"Incomplete"	2000	Chris Robinson	Sisqó	Another version was produced for the Stargate remix	
"I Sings"	2001	Sanaa Hamri	Mary Mary, BB Jay	Sisqó appears dancing with Mary Mary near the end of the video	
"Can I Live?"	2001	Dave Meyers	Sisqó, LovHer, Cooli Hi	Another version was produced for the Stargate remix	
"Dance for Me"	2001	Dave Meyers	Sisqó		
"Who's Ur Daddy?"	2006	Verna Stein	Sisqó		
"Sleep for Days"	2011	Supa Dave	Cooli Hi, Sisqó		
"A-List"	2014	Itchy House Films	Sisqó, Waka Flocka		
"L.I.P.S."	2014	Parris	Sisqó		
"Without You"	2015	—N/a	Sisqó, Gummy		
"Thong Song"	2017	Sam Brave	JCY, Sisqó		
"Secret Garden"	2020	Derek Blanks	Omar Wilson, Raheem DeVaughn, Shawn Stockman, Sisqó		
"La Thong"	2021	Kaled Lopez	Sisqó, JD Pantoja		

== Home videos ==
Title	Video details	Note(s)
The Thong Song Uncensored	Released: June 27, 2000; Label: Millennium Media Ser; Formats: VHS, DVD	
24 Hours with Sisqó	Released: March 29, 2001; Label: Mvd Visual; Formats: DVD	
Dru Hill Hits: The Videos	Released: October 11, 2005; Label: Def Soul Classics; Formats: DVD	Includes videos for "Thong Song" and "Incomplete"
