= Dave Meyers videography =

Music videos directed by American director

This is a list of music videos directed by Dave Meyers.

== Music videos ==
=== 1997 ===
- E-40 featuring B-Legit and Richie Rich – "Yay Deep"
- Made Men – "You Could Be the One"
- Plexi – "Forest Ranger"
- Twista – "Get It Wet"
- Sons of Funk – "Pushin' Inside You"
- Master P – "Ghetto D"
- Master P – "6 in the Mornin'"
- Kurupt – "It's a Set Up"
- The WhoRidas – "Keep It Goin'"
- Young Bleed featuring Master P and Fiend – "Times So Hard"
- Luke – "Raise the Roof"

=== 1998 ===
- E-40 – "Hope I Don't Go Back"
- Ginuwine featuring Timbaland – "Same Ol' G"
- Ice Cube – "War & Peace"
- Magic featuring C-Murder – "No Hope"
- MC Ren – "Ruthless for Life"
- Silkk the Shocker featuring Destiny's Child – "Just 'B' Straight" (version 2)
- C-Murder featuring Master P & Silkk the Shocker – “A 2nd Chance”

=== 1999 ===
- Kid Rock - "Bawitdaba"
- Powerman 5000 - "When Worlds Collide"
- Juvenile - "Back That Thang Up"
- Kid Rock - "Cowboy"
- Def Leppard - "Goodbye"
- Sugar Ray - "Falls Apart"
- Lil Wayne - "Tha Block Is Hot"
- Powerman 5000 - "Nobody's Real"
- Filter - "Take a Picture"
- LL Cool J - "Shut 'Em Down"
- Jay-Z featuring Beanie Sigel - "Do It Again (Put Ya Hands Up)"
- Eve featuring Faith Evans - "Love Is Blind"

=== 2000 ===
- Buckcherry - "Check Your Head"
- Da Brat - "That's What I'm Looking For"
- Pink - "There You Go"
- Tal Bachman - "If You Sleep"
- Static-X - "I'm with Stupid"
- Enrique Iglesias - "Be with You"
- Nas featuring Ginuwine - "You Owe Me"
- Drag-On featuring DMX - "Niggaz Die for Me"
- Hanson - "This Time Around"
- Goodie Mob featuring TLC - "What It Ain't (Ghetto Enuff)"
- Beanie Sigel - "The Truth"
- Da Brat featuring Tyrese - "What'chu Like"
- DMX - "Party Up (Up in Here)"
- Kid Rock - "American Bad Ass"
- Hanson - "If Only"
- Lil' Mo - "Ta Da"
- Eve featuring Jadakiss - "Got It All"
- Jermaine Dupri and Nas featuring Monica - "I've Got to Have It"
- Lil' Bow Wow - "Bounce with Me"
- Creed - "With Arms Wide Open"
- Kottonmouth Kings - "Peace Not Greed"
- Britney Spears - "Lucky"
- Pink - "Most Girls"
- Mack 10 - "From tha Streetz"
- Ja Rule featuring Christina Milian - "Between Me and You"
- VAST - "Free"
- Killing Heidi - "Weir" (USA Version)
- Outkast - "B.O.B."
- Jay-Z - "I Just Wanna Love U (Give It 2 Me)"
- NSYNC - "This I Promise You"
- The Offspring - "Original Prankster"
- Pru - "Candles"
- Lil' Bow Wow featuring Snoop Dogg - "Bow Wow (That's My Name)"
- Chico DeBarge - "Playa Hater"
- Mýa - "Free"
- Mack 10 featuring T-Boz - "Tight to Def"
- Lil Zane - "None Tonight"
- Xzibit - "X"
- Pink - "You Make Me Sick"

=== 2001 ===
- Jay-Z featuring Beanie Sigel & Memphis Bleek - "Change the Game"
- O-Town - "Liquid Dreams"
- Scarface - "Look Me in My Eyes"
- Dido - "Thank You"
- Monica - "Just Another Girl"
- Memphis Bleek - "Do My..."
- Lil' Bow Wow featuring Jagged Edge - "Puppy Love"
- Run-DMC - "Rock Show"
- Dave Matthews Band - "I Did It"
- Outkast - "So Fresh, So Clean"
- Janet Jackson - "All for You"
- Tyrese - "I Like Them Girls"
- Saliva - "Your Disease"
- Missy Elliott - "Get Ur Freak On"
- The Product G&B - "Cluck Cluck"
- Nicole - "I'm Lookin'"
- Usher - "U Remind Me"
- Dave Matthews Band - "The Space Between"
- Snoop Dogg featuring Tyrese - "Just a Baby Boy"
- Sisqó featuring LovHer - "Can I Live?"
- Redman featuring DJ Kool - "Let's Get Dirty (I Can't Get in da Club)"
- Missy Elliott featuring Ludacris and Trina - "One Minute Man"
- Jennifer Lopez - "I'm Real"
- Jagged Edge featuring Nelly - "Where the Party At" (version 1)
- Sisqó - "Dance for Me"
- Brian McKnight - "Love of My Life"
- Redman - "Smash Sumthin'"
- Jennifer Lopez featuring Ja Rule - "I'm Real (Murder Remix)"
- Limp Bizkit - "Boiler"
- Macy Gray - "Sweet Baby"
- Mary J. Blige - "Family Affair"
- Slipknot - "Left Behind"
- Jay-Z - "Izzo (H.O.V.A.)"
- Ja Rule featuring Case - "Livin' It Up"
- Jermaine Dupri featuring Nate Dogg - "Ballin' Out of Control"
- Christina Milian - "AM to PM"
- Pink - "Get the Party Started" (version 1)
- Nikka Costa - "Everybody Got Their Something"
- No Doubt featuring Bounty Killer - "Hey Baby"
- Missy Elliott featuring Ginuwine and Tweet - "Take Away"
- The Offspring - "Defy You"
- Creed - "My Sacrifice"
- Ja Rule featuring Ashanti - "Always on Time"

=== 2002 ===
- Aaliyah – "More Than a Woman"
- Enrique Iglesias - "Escape"
- Brandy - "What About Us?"
- Mick Jagger - "Visions of Paradise"
- Pink - "Don't Let Me Get Me"
- Lil' Bow Wow - "Take Ya Home"
- Celine Dion - "A New Day Has Come"
- Anastacia - "One Day In Your Life"
- Creed - "One Last Breath"
- B2K - "Gots ta Be"
- Papa Roach - "She Loves Me Not"
- Jennifer Lopez featuring Nas - "I'm Gonna Be Alright"
- Missy Elliott - "4 My People"
- Celine Dion - "I'm Alive"
- Aerosmith - "Girls of Summer"
- Britney Spears featuring Pharrell - "Boys" (The Co-Ed Remix)
- Shakira - "Objection / Te Aviso, Te Anuncio"
- Beenie Man featuring Janet Jackson - "Feel It Boy"
- Trina featuring Tweet - "No Panties"
- Lifehouse - "Spin"
- TLC - "Girl Talk"
- Missy Elliott - "Work It"
- Mariah Carey - "Through the Rain"
- Creed - "Don't Stop Dancing"
- Amerie - "Talkin' to Me"
- Toni Braxton featuring Loon - "Hit the Freeway"
- Birdman featuring Diddy - "Do That"
- Missy Elliott featuring Ludacris - "Gossip Folks"
- Khia featuring Markus Vance - "You My Girl"

=== 2003 ===
- Jennifer Lopez featuring LL Cool J - "All I Have"
- Ginuwine - "Hell Yeah"
- Thalía featuring Fat Joe - "I Want You / Me Pones Sexy"
- Pink - "Feel Good Time"
- Stacie Orrico - "(There's Gotta Be) More to Life"
- JS - "Ice Cream"
- Korn - "Did My Time"
- Westside Connection featuring Nate Dogg - "Gangsta Nation"
- Ludacris - "Stand Up"
- Missy Elliott - "Pass That Dutch"
- Missy Elliott - "Back in the Day" (Unreleased)

=== 2004 ===
- Ludacris - "Splash Waterfalls"
- Dilated Peoples featuring Kanye West and John Legend - "This Way"
- Janet Jackson - "Just a Little While" (version 1)
- Janet Jackson - "I Want You"
- N.E.R.D - "She Wants to Move"
- Hilary Duff - "Come Clean"
- Jay-Z - "Dirt off Your Shoulder"
- Brandy featuring Kanye West - "Talk About Our Love"
- Kelly Clarkson - "Breakaway"
- Britney Spears - "Outrageous" (Unfinished)

=== 2005 ===
- Lil Jon and the East Side Boyz - "Roll Call"
- Dave Matthews Band - "American Baby"
- Missy Elliott featuring Ciara - "Lose Control"/"On & On"
- Dave Matthews Band - "Dreamgirl"
- The Veronicas - "4ever" (Australian version)
- Rhymefest featuring Kanye West - "Brand New"
- Santana featuring Steven Tyler - "Just Feel Better"
- Korn - "Twisted Transistor"

=== 2006 ===
- Pink - "Stupid Girls"
- Missy Elliott - "We Run This"
- Pink - "U + Ur Hand"

=== 2007 ===
- Fergie featuring Ludacris - "Glamorous"
- Natasha Bedingfield - "I Wanna Have Your Babies"
- Korn - "Evolution"
- Pretty Ricky featuring Sean Paul - "Push It Baby"
- Rob Thomas - "Little Wonders"

=== 2008 ===
- Missy Elliott - "Ching-a-Ling/Shake Your Pom Pom"
- Pink - "So What"
- T.I. - "Whatever You Like"

=== 2009 ===
- Pink - "Please Don't Leave Me"
- Lil Wayne - "Prom Queen"
- Rob Thomas - "Her Diamonds"
- Britney Spears - "Radar"
- Pink - "Funhouse"

=== 2010 ===
- Ludacris – "How Low"
- Avril Lavigne – "Alice"
- Leona Lewis – "I Got You"
- Justin Bieber featuring Usher – "Somebody to Love (Remix)"
- Katy Perry – "Firework"
- Pink – "Raise Your Glass"

=== 2011 ===
- Pink – "Fuckin' Perfect"
- David Guetta featuring Flo Rida and Nicki Minaj – "Where Them Girls At"
- David Guetta featuring Taio Cruz and Ludacris – "Little Bad Girl"
- Avril Lavigne – "Wish You Were Here"

=== 2012 ===
- Rihanna – "Where Have You Been"
- P!nk – "Blow Me (One Last Kiss)" (Black & White and Colored Versions)

=== 2015 ===
- Janelle Monáe and Jidenna – "Yoga"
- Ciara – "Dance like We're Making Love"
- Janet Jackson – "No Sleeep"
- Pia Mia – "Touch"
- Missy Elliott featuring Pharrell – "WTF (Where They From) (Directed with Missy Elliott)"

=== 2016 ===
- Bebe Rexha featuring Nicki Minaj – "No Broken Hearts"
- Janet Jackson – "Dammn Baby"
- Pink – "Just Like Fire"
- CL – "Lifted"
- CL - "All In"

=== 2017 ===
- Bebe Rexha – "I Got You"
- Missy Elliott featuring Cainon Lamb – "I'm Better (Directed with Missy Elliott)"
- Ariana Grande and John Legend – "Beauty and the Beast"
- WINNER – "Really Really"
- Kendrick Lamar – "HUMBLE." (Directed with Little Homies)
- SZA – "Drew Barrymore"
- Kendrick Lamar featuring Rihanna – "LOYALTY." (Directed with Little Homies)
- Katy Perry featuring Nicki Minaj – "Swish Swish"
- Kelly Clarkson – "Love So Soft"
- Camila Cabello featuring Young Thug – "Havana"
- Kendrick Lamar featuring Zacari – "LOVE." (Directed with Little Homies)

=== 2018 ===
- Justin Timberlake – "Supplies"
- Zedd, Maren Morris, and Grey – "The Middle"
- Kendrick Lamar and SZA – "All the Stars" (Directed with Little Homies)
- Maroon 5 – "Wait"
- WINNER – "Everyday"
- Ariana Grande – "No Tears Left to Cry"
- Jay Rock – "WIN" (Directed with Dave Free)
- Ariana Grande featuring Nicki Minaj – "The Light Is Coming"
- Ariana Grande – "Raindrops (An Angel Cried)"
- Ariana Grande – "God Is a Woman"
- Travis Scott – "Stop Trying to Be God"
- Janet Jackson and Daddy Yankee – "Made for Now"
- Camila Cabello – "Consequences" (music's video script written along with Camila Cabello)
- Travis Scott featuring Drake – "Sicko Mode"
- Imagine Dragons – "Zero"
- Cai Xukun – "Wait Wait Wait"

=== 2019 ===
- Maren Morris – "Girl"
- Billie Eilish – "Bad Guy"
- Taylor Swift featuring Brendon Urie – "Me!" (Directed with Taylor Swift)
- Rich Brian featuring Bekon – "Yellow"
- Ed Sheeran and Travis Scott – "Antisocial"
- Shawn Mendes and Camila Cabello – "Señorita"
- Normani – "Motivation" (Directed with Daniel Russell)
- Camila Cabello – "Liar"
- Travis Scott – "Highest in the Room" (Directed with Travis Scott)
- Harry Styles – "Adore You (Original & Extended Versions; music's video script written along with Chris Shafer)"

=== 2020 ===
- Camila Cabello featuring DaBaby – "My Oh My"
- Rita Ora – "How to Be Lonely"
- Harry Styles – "Falling"
- Anderson .Paak – "Lockdown"
- Drake featuring Lil Durk – "Laugh Now Cry Later"
- Ariana Grande – "Positions"

=== 2021 ===
- Saweetie featuring Doja Cat – "Best Friend"
- Pink – "All I Know So Far (Original & Extended Versions)"
- DJ Khaled featuring Post Malone, Megan Thee Stallion, Lil Baby, and DaBaby – "I DID IT"
- Coldplay – "Higher Power"
- Ed Sheeran – "Bad Habits"
- Drake featuring Future and Young Thug – "Way 2 Sexy"
- Ed Sheeran – "Shivers"
- Coldplay and BTS – "My Universe"

=== 2022 ===
- Coldplay and Selena Gomez – "Let Somebody Go"
- Megan Thee Stallion and Dua Lipa – "Sweetest Pie"
- Ciara featuring Coast Contra – "Jump"
- SZA – "Shirt"

=== 2023 ===
- Drake feat. 21 Savage – "Spin Bout U"
- Little Simz – "Gorilla"

=== 2024 ===
- Jennifer Lopez – "Can't Get Enough"
- Jennifer Lopez – "Rebound"
- Usher & PEELZ – "Ruin"
- Travis Scott – "I Know?" (Directed with Travis Scott)
- Sabrina Carpenter – "Espresso"
- Usher & H.E.R. – "Risk It All"
- Victoria Monét – "Alright"
- Lisa featuring Rosalía – "New Woman"
- Sabrina Carpenter – "Taste"
- Dr. Dre & Snoop Dogg – "Missionary" (Short film)

=== 2025 ===
- Snoop Dogg featuring Tom Petty and Jelly Roll – "Last Dance with Mary Jane"
- Little Simz – "Young"
- Lola Young – "One Thing"
- Blackpink – "Jump"
- Doja Cat – "Stranger"

=== 2026 ===
- Burna Boy – "For Everybody" (Sporty TV Collaboration)
- Raye featuring Hans Zimmer – "Click Clack Symphony."
- Ludacris – "Pull Over" (directed with Cam Erickson)
- Victoria Monét – "Reach Out"
- Fontaines D.C. – "Marianne" (directed with Cam Erickson)
- Anderson .Paak X Cordae – "A Good Day"
- Rosé – "New Trick"
