= Weekend on the Rocks =

Live album by Dave Matthews Band
- Released: November 29, 2005
- Recorded: September 9–12, 2005
- Venues: Red Rocks Amphitheatre, Morrison, Colorado
- Genre: Rock
- Length: 131:04
- Label: RCA Records
- Producers: John Alagía, Coran Capshaw, Bruce Flohr, Terry Fryer, Patrick G. Jordan, Hank Neuberger, Stephen Warner

Dave Matthews Band chronology
Stand Up (2005)	Weekend on the Rocks (2005)	The Best of What's Around Vol. 1 (2006)

Professional ratings
Review scores
Source	Rating
Allmusic	3/5 stars

Weekend on the Rocks is a live album by Dave Matthews Band. It contains highlights of the four shows in four days the band performed at Red Rocks Amphitheatre in Morrison, Colorado on September 9–12, 2005. The set is packaged on two CDs and one DVD. However, a complete recording of the four shows, entitled The Complete Weekend on the Rocks, is available on eight discs. This is the second officially released live recording of Dave Matthews Band concerts at Red Rocks Amphitheatre. The first was Live at Red Rocks 8.15.95.

== Track listing ==
Disc one

1. "The Stone" (David J. Matthews) – 10:10
2. "American Baby" (Carter Beauford, Stefan Lessard, Matthews, LeRoi Moore, Boyd Tinsley, Mark Batson) – 4:31
3. "Time of the Season" (Rod Argent) – 4:29
4. "Say Goodbye" (Matthews) – 7:19
5. "#34" (Beauford, Matthews, Moore, Haines Fullerton) – 5:51
6. "Steady as We Go" (Beauford, Lessard, Matthews, Moore, Tinsley, Batson) – 4:18
7. "Hunger for the Great Light" (Beauford, Lessard, Matthews, Moore, Tinsley, Batson) – 3:41
8. "Bartender" (Beauford, Lessard, Matthews, Moore, Tinsley) – 16:37

Disc two

1. "Don't Burn The Pig" (Beauford, Lessard, Matthews, Moore, Tinsley) – 7:01
2. "You Never Know" (Beauford, Lessard, Matthews, Moore, Tinsley) – 7:10
3. "Stand Up (For It)" (Beauford, Lessard, Matthews, Moore, Tinsley, Batson) – 4:22
4. "#41" (Beauford, Lessard, Matthews, Moore, Tinsley) – 15:20
5. "Stolen Away on 55th & 3rd" (Beauford, Lessard, Matthews, Moore, Tinsley, Batson) – 5:28
6. "Smooth Rider" (Beauford, Lessard, Matthews, Moore, Tinsley, Batson) – 12:10
7. "Halloween" (Matthews) – 4:55
8. "Louisiana Bayou" (Beauford, Lessard, Matthews, Moore, Tinsley, Batson) – 9:00
9. "Everyday" (Matthews, Glen Ballard) – 8:44

=== DVD ===
1. "Stand Up (For It)"
2. "Time of the Season"
3. "Dreamgirl"
4. "Everybody Wake Up (Our Finest Hour Arrives)"
5. "Crash into Me"
6. "So Much to Say" » "Anyone Seen the Bridge?"
7. "Too Much"
8. "Louisiana Bayou"
9. "Recently"
10. "Jimi Thing"

== Track listing for The Complete Weekend on the Rocks ==
The Complete Weekend on the Rocks is an expanded version, containing all four shows on eight CDs and one DVD. It is only available online, as opposed to the condensed version, which is more widely available.

=== Disc one (9/9/05) ===
1. "Everyday" – 9:25
2. "Time of the Season" – 4:28
3. "Say Goodbye" – 7:13
4. "Dreamgirl" – 10:25
5. "Louisiana Bayou" – 7:49
6. "The Stone" – 9:42
7. "Stolen Away On 55th & 3rd" – 5:44
8. "Bartender" – 16:43

=== Disc two (9/9/05) ===
1. "What Would You Say" – 5:45
2. "Everybody Wake Up (Our Finest Hour Arrives)" – 5:24
3. "American Baby Intro" – 7:05
4. "Dancing Nancies" – 10:35
5. "Warehouse" – 10:10
6. "So Much to Say" – 5:30
7. "Too Much" – 5:43
8. "Old Dirt Hill" – 6:58
9. "Ants Marching" – 7:40

=== Disc three (9/10/05) ===
1. "Seek Up" – 22:15
2. "One Sweet World" – 6:09
3. "Don't Drink the Water" – 6:37
4. "Hunger for the Great Light" – 3:45
5. "Rhyme & Reason" – 5:35
6. "#34" – 5:58
7. "Smooth Rider" – 8:39
8. "Jimi Thing" – 19:19

=== Disc four (9/10/05) ===
1. "Blackbird" – 9:58
2. "Steady as We Go" – 4:07
3. "Hello Again" – 8:06
4. "Crash into Me" – 5:43
5. "Louisiana Bayou" – 8:44
6. "The Best of What's Around" – 5:52
7. "American Baby" – 4:45
8. "Tripping Billies" – 5:23
9. "Where Are You Going" – 3:41
10. "Two Step" – 18:04

=== Disc five (9/11/05) ===
1. "Don't Burn The Pig" – 7:11
2. "You Never Know" – 7:16
3. "Stand Up" – 4:29
4. "Grey Street" – 4:43
5. "When The World Ends" – 3:36
6. "Dreamgirl" – 9:19
7. "Lie in Our Graves" – 15:39
8. "Lover Lay Down" – 7:44
9. "What You Are" – 9:07

=== Disc six (9/11/05) ===
1. "Out of My Hands" – 4:28
2. "#41" – 15:21
3. "Granny" – 5:09
4. "Halloween" – 4:52
5. "Butterfly" – 2:48
6. "Crush" – 14:02
7. "Pantala Naga Pampa" – 0:39
8. "Rapunzel" – 7:09
9. "Louisiana Bayou" – 7:35
10. "All Along the Watchtower" – 10:13

=== Disc seven (9/12/05) ===
1. "Recently" – 8:27
2. "Drive In Drive Out" – 6:35
3. "Typical Situation" – 13:10
4. "Everyday" – 8:27
5. "Everybody Wake Up (Our Finest Hour Arrives)" – 5:56
6. "Old Dirt Hill" – 7:38
7. "Hunger for the Great Light" – 3:40
8. "American Baby Intro" – 12:18
9. "Dreamgirl" – 10:53

=== Disc eight (9/12/05) ===
1. "Jimi Thing" – 22:39
2. "Exodus" (with Robert Randolph, Ivan Neville & David CasT) – 19:02
3. "Louisiana Bayou" (with Robert Randolph & David CasT) – 9:35
4. "Smooth Rider" – 12:33
5. "Too Much" – 6:00

== Personnel ==
Dave Matthews Band

- Carter Beauford – drums, vocals
- Dave Matthews – guitar, vocals
- LeRoi Moore – horn, vocals
- Stefan Lessard – bass
- Boyd Tinsley – violin, vocals

Guest artists

- Robert Randolph – pedal steel
- Rashawn Ross – trumpet
- Butch Taylor – keyboards, vocals

Production

- John Alagia – mixing, producer
- Scott Campbell – mixing
- Coran Capshaw – executive producer
- C. Taylor Crothers – photography
- Mike Czaszwicz – engineer
- Rob Evans – digital assembly, digital editing
- Bruce Flohr – executive producer
- Terry Fryer – producer
- Patrick G. Jordan – executive producer
- Tosh Kasai – digital editing, engineer
- Chris Kress – digital assembly, digital editing
- Joe Lawlor – live recording
- Stephen Marcussen – mastering
- Hank Neuberger – producer
- Frank Pappalardo – engineer, mixing
- Jeff Romano – digital editing
- Brian Scheuble – mixing
- Joe Thomas – video director, video producer
- Stephen Warner – producer
- Stewart Whitmore – digital editing
- Fenton Williams – lighting design

== Chart performance ==
Year	Chart	Position
2005	The Billboard 200	37
