= Can I Live =

Can I Live may refer to:

- "Can I Live?", a 2001 song by Sisqó
- "Can I Live" (Jay-Z song), 1996
- "Can I Live", a 2005 song by Nick Cannon
- "Can I Live", a 2000 song by Black Rob from the album Life Story
- "Can I Live", a 2018 song by Trina from the album Trina
- "Can I Live?", a 2022 song by Sampa the Great from the album As Above, So Below
