= The Masked Singer (American TV series) season 11 =

The Masked Singer
- Season 11
- Promotional poster for season eleven, featuring "Goldfish"
- Starring: Robin Thicke; Jenny McCarthy Wahlberg; Ken Jeong; Rita Ora
- Hosted by: Nick Cannon
- No. of contestants: 16
- Winner: Vanessa Hudgens as "Goldfish"
- Runner-up: Scott Porter as "Gumball"
- No. of episodes: 13

Release
- Original network: Fox
- Original release: March 6 – May 22, 2024

Season chronology
- ← Previous; Season 10 Next → Season 12

The eleventh season of the American television series The Masked Singer premiered on Fox on March 6, 2024, and concluded on May 22, 2024. The season was won by actor Vanessa Hudgens as "Goldfish", with actor Scott Porter finishing second as "Gumball".

== Panelists and host ==
Season 11 panelists and host

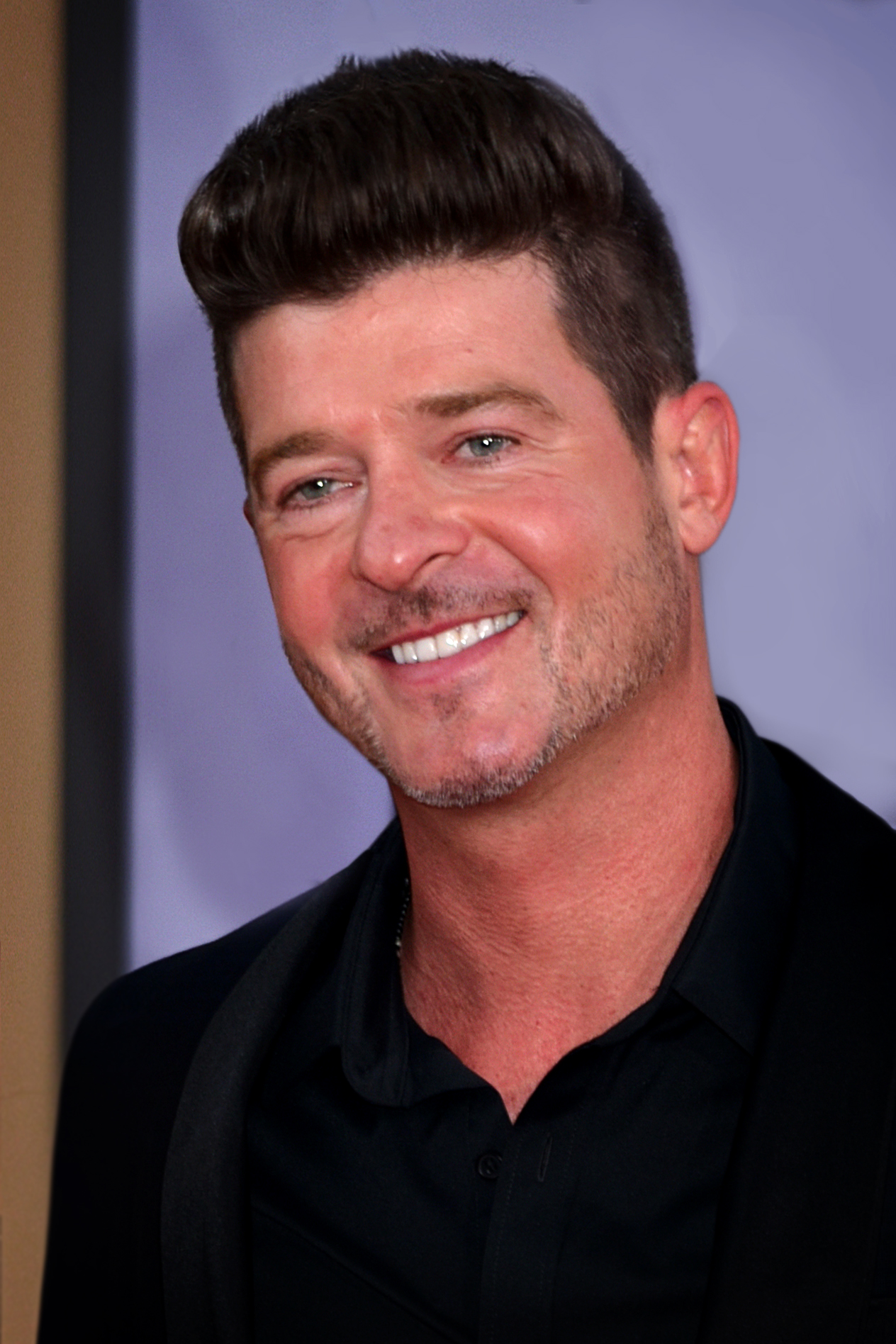
Robin Thicke

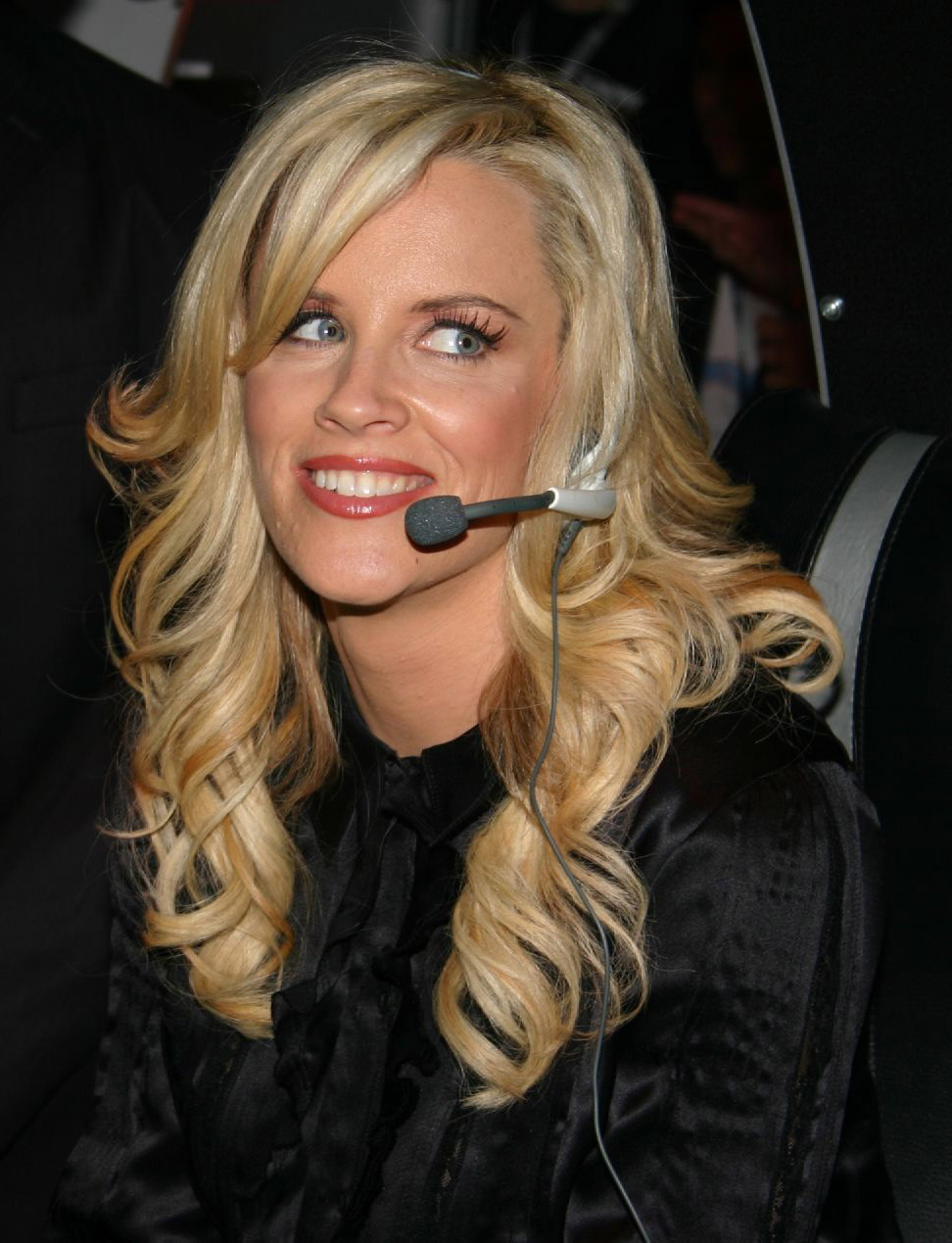
Jenny McCarthy Wahlberg

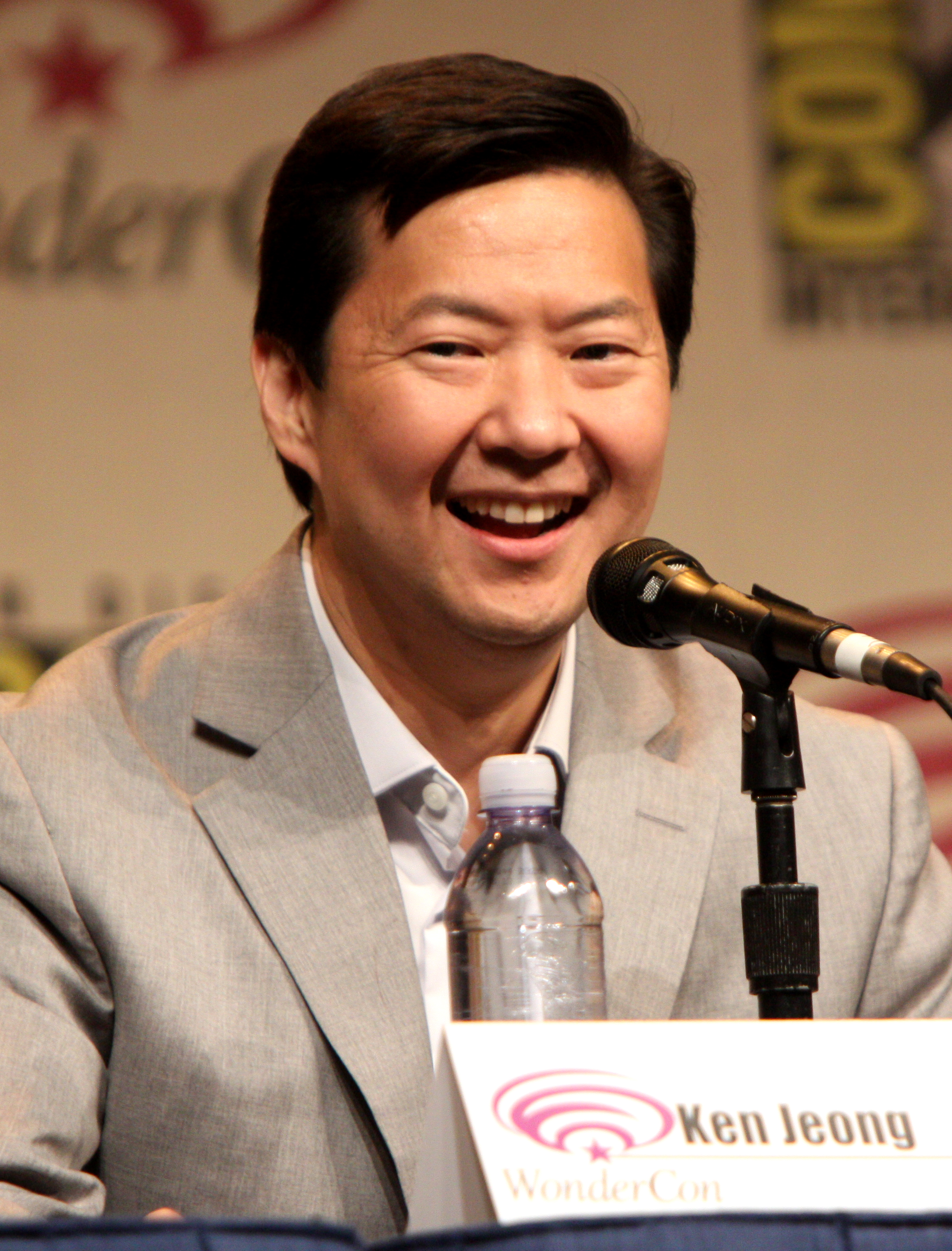
Ken Jeong

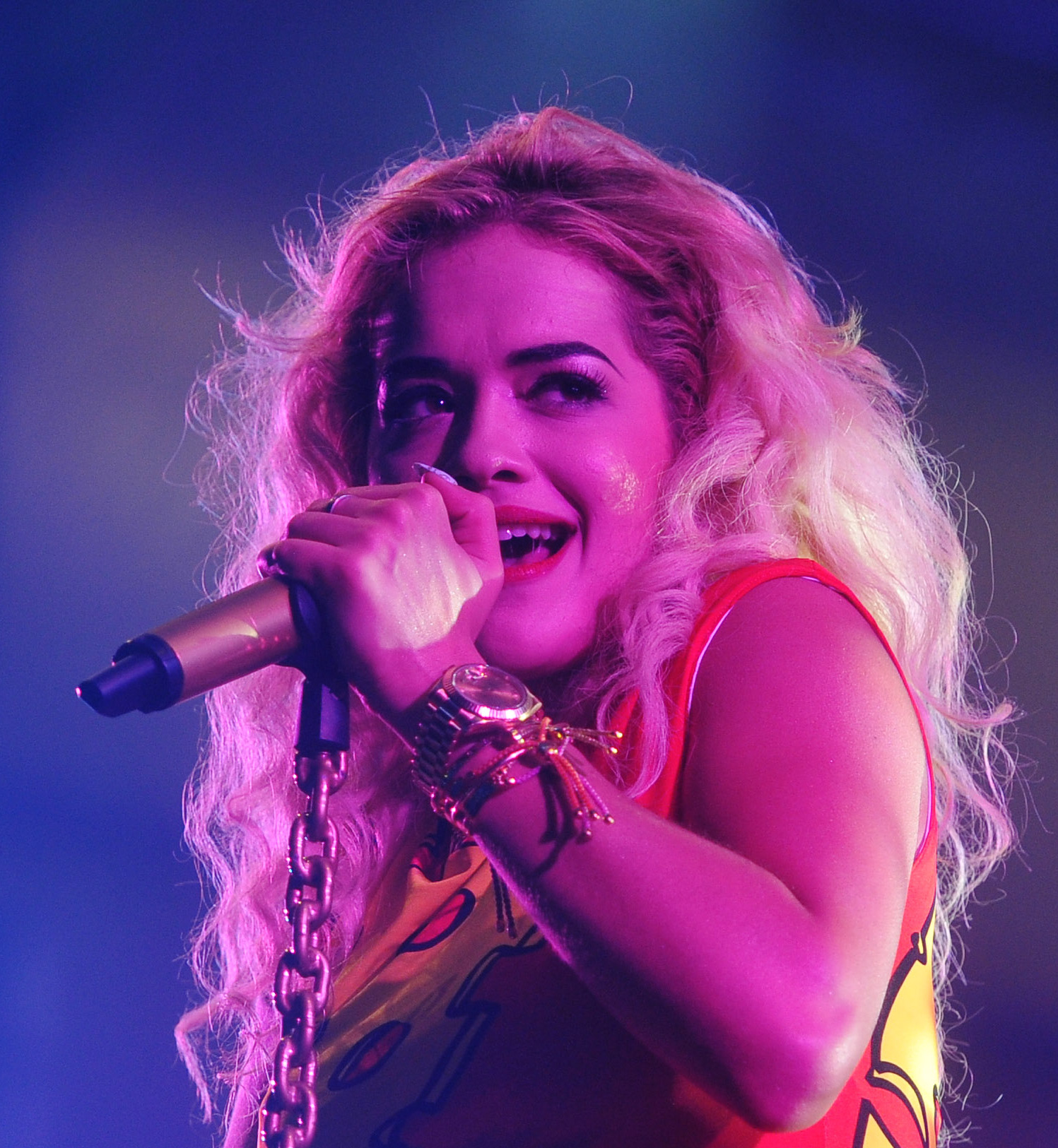
Rita Ora

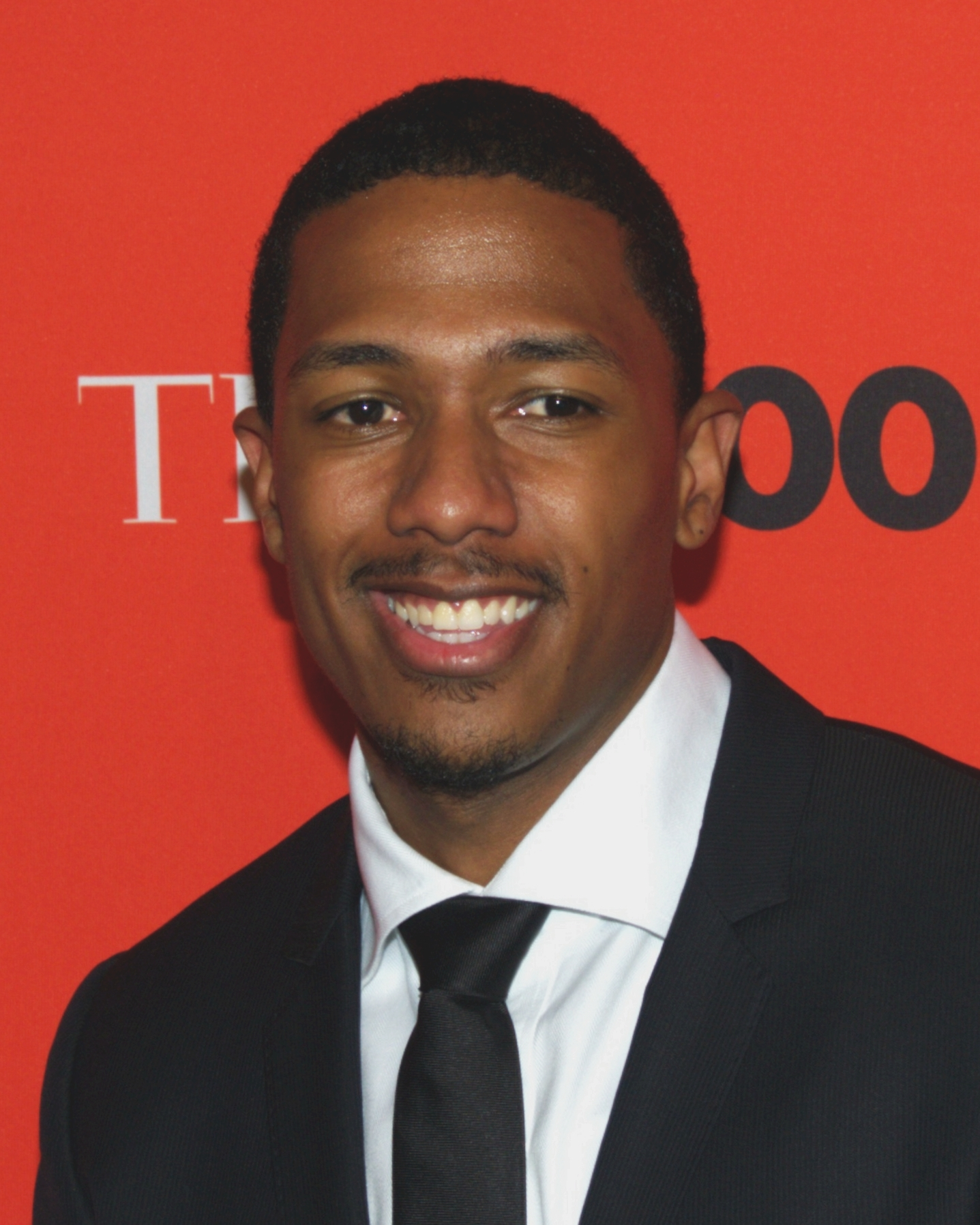
Nick Cannon

Nick Cannon, singer-songwriter Robin Thicke, television and radio personality Jenny McCarthy Wahlberg, and actor and comedian Ken Jeong all returned as host and panelists. On September 13, 2023, it was announced that recording artist and panelist of the British adaptation of the show, Rita Ora, would substitute for longtime panelist Nicole Scherzinger, as the latter stars in the West End revival of Sunset Boulevard, conflicting with the filming of the eleventh season. Ora's addition marks the first major change to the panel since the series' inception.

The second episode features season four winner LeAnn Rimes ("Sun") as an additional guest, the fourth episode included Jill Whelan and Heidi and Spencer Pratt as additional guests, the sixth episode included Transformers characters Optimus Prime (voiced by Peter Cullen) and Bumblebee as additional guests, and the eighth episode included Carnie Wilson of season eight runners-up Wilson Phillips ("Lambs") and Raven-Symoné ("Black Widow" from season two) as additional guests.

== Production ==
The format is similar to its predecessor; featuring three groups, with Group A starting with five costumes and Groups B and C starting with four. Each group featured one wild card added later during the season. The panelists have one opportunity to use the "Ding Dong Keep It On" bell (introduced in the ninth season) to save one contestant, who moves to the quarterfinals with the group finalists. From there, three competed in the semifinals and two moved on to the finale.

Much like the previous three seasons of the series, the eleventh season featured the return of themed nights. Throughout the season, themes included nights dedicated to Billy Joel and Queen, musical film The Wizard of Oz, film-toy franchise Transformers, "Girl Groups", and "Shower Anthems". Additionally for the first time, themes such as "Soundtrack of My Life" and "TV Themes" were featured once again after having already been represented in previous seasons.

== Contestants ==
The season featured 16 celebrities split into three groups, as well as three wild card contestants who entered the competition later during the season.

The contestants are said to boast a combined total of 22 Grammy nominations, 11 platinum albums, 33 Teen Choice nominations, 108 million records sold, 1.7 billion Spotify streams, and 326 film appearances.

Stage name	Celebrity	Occupation(s)	Episodes											
Stage name	Celebrity	Occupation(s)	1	2	3	4	5	6	7	8	9	10	12	13
Stage name	Celebrity	Occupation(s)	Group A	Group B	Group C			A		B		10	12	13
Goldfish	Vanessa Hudgens	Actor/singer	SAFE					SAFE	WIN			SAFE	SAFE	WINNER
Gumball	Scott Porter	Actor		RISK						SAFE	WIN	RISK	SAFE	RUNNER-UP
Clock	Thelma Houston	Singer			SAFE	SAFE	WIN					SAFE	OUT	
Poodle Moth	Chrissy Metz (Note: Metz previously appeared during the fifth season as a guest panelist.)	Actor/singer			SAFE	SAFE	KEPT (Note: While in the middle of their unmasking and per the chanting of the audience, panelist Rita Ora used the "Ding Dong Keep It On" bell to save Poodle Moth from elimination, allowing the portrayer to keep their mask on and continue in the competition.)					OUT		
Beets	Clay Aiken	Singer/activist		SAFE						SAFE	OUT			
Beets	Ruben Studdard	Singer		SAFE						SAFE	OUT			
Seal (WC)	Corey Feldman	Actor								RISK	OUT			
Miss Cleocatra	Jenifer Lewis	Actor/singer		SAFE						OUT				
Starfish	Kate Flannery	Actor	SAFE					SAFE	OUT					
Ugly Sweater	Charlie Wilson	Singer	SAFE					SAFE	OUT					
Koala (WC)	DeMarcus Ware	Former NFL player						OUT						
Lovebird	Colton Underwood	TV personality	SAFE					OUT						
Lizard	Sisqó	Singer			RISK	RISK	OUT							
Sir Lion (WC)	Billy Bush	Broadcaster				OUT								
Spaghetti & Meatballs	Joe Bastianich	Restaurateur/TV personality			OUT									
Afghan Hound	Savannah Chrisley	TV personality		OUT										
Book	Kevin Hart	Actor/comedian	WD (Note: After his performance, Hart immediately unmasked himself revealing it to be a prank on Cannon.)											

- WIN The masked singer won with their performance and advanced in the competition.
- KEPT The masked singer was saved from elimination by a panelist using the "Ding Dong Keep It On" bell.
- RISK The masked singer was in the bottom two, but was not eliminated.
- SAFE The masked singer was safe from elimination.
- OUT The masked singer was eliminated from the competition and unmasked.
- WD The masked singer unmasked themselves and left the competition.
- The masked singer did not perform.

(WC) This masked singer is a wild card contestant.

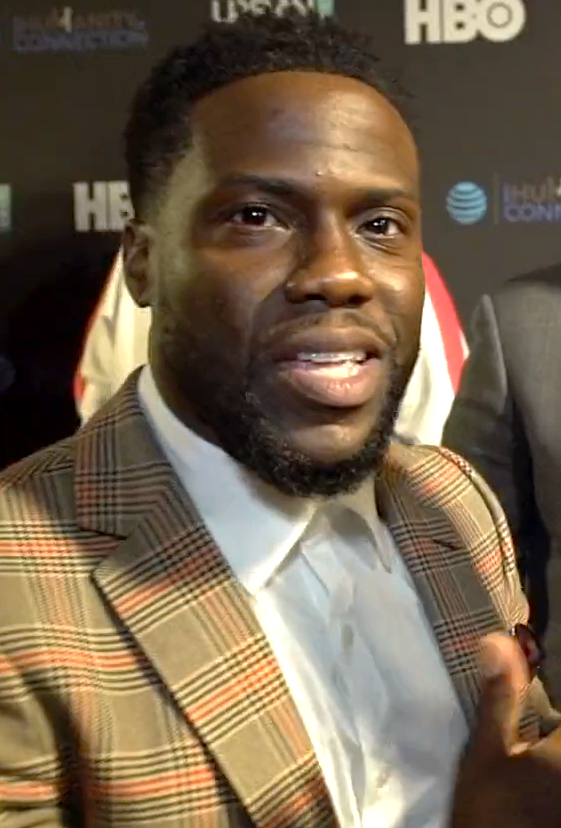
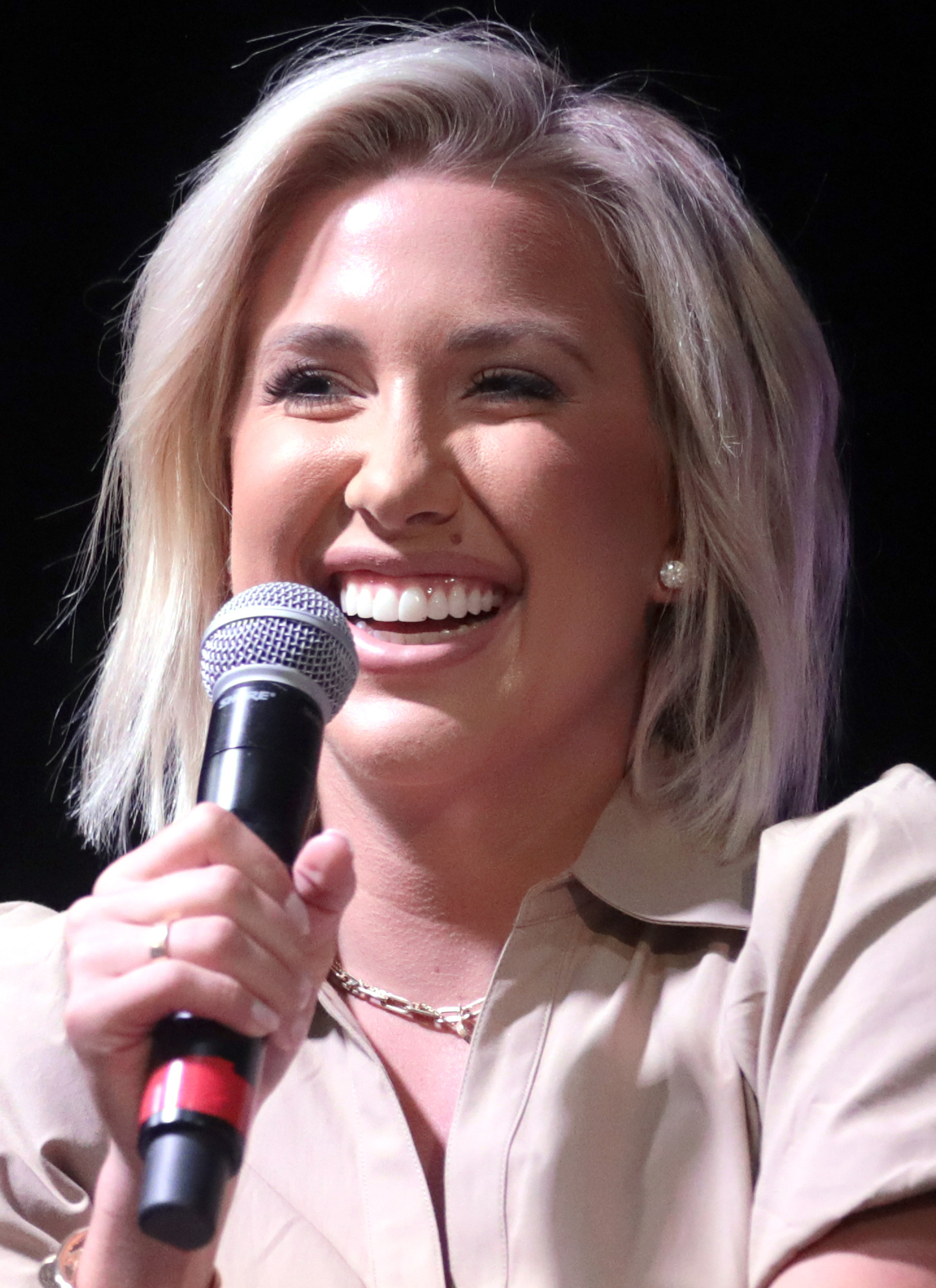
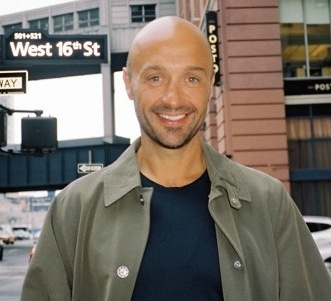
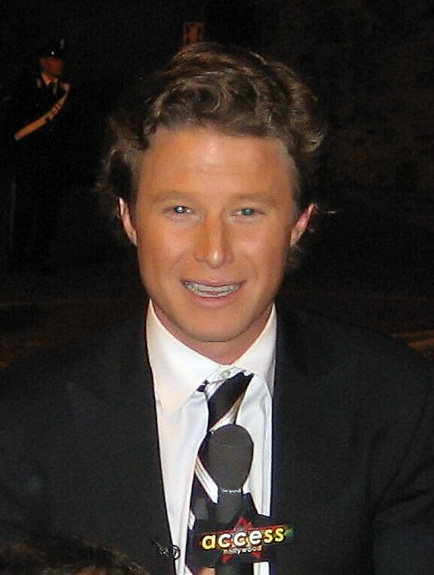
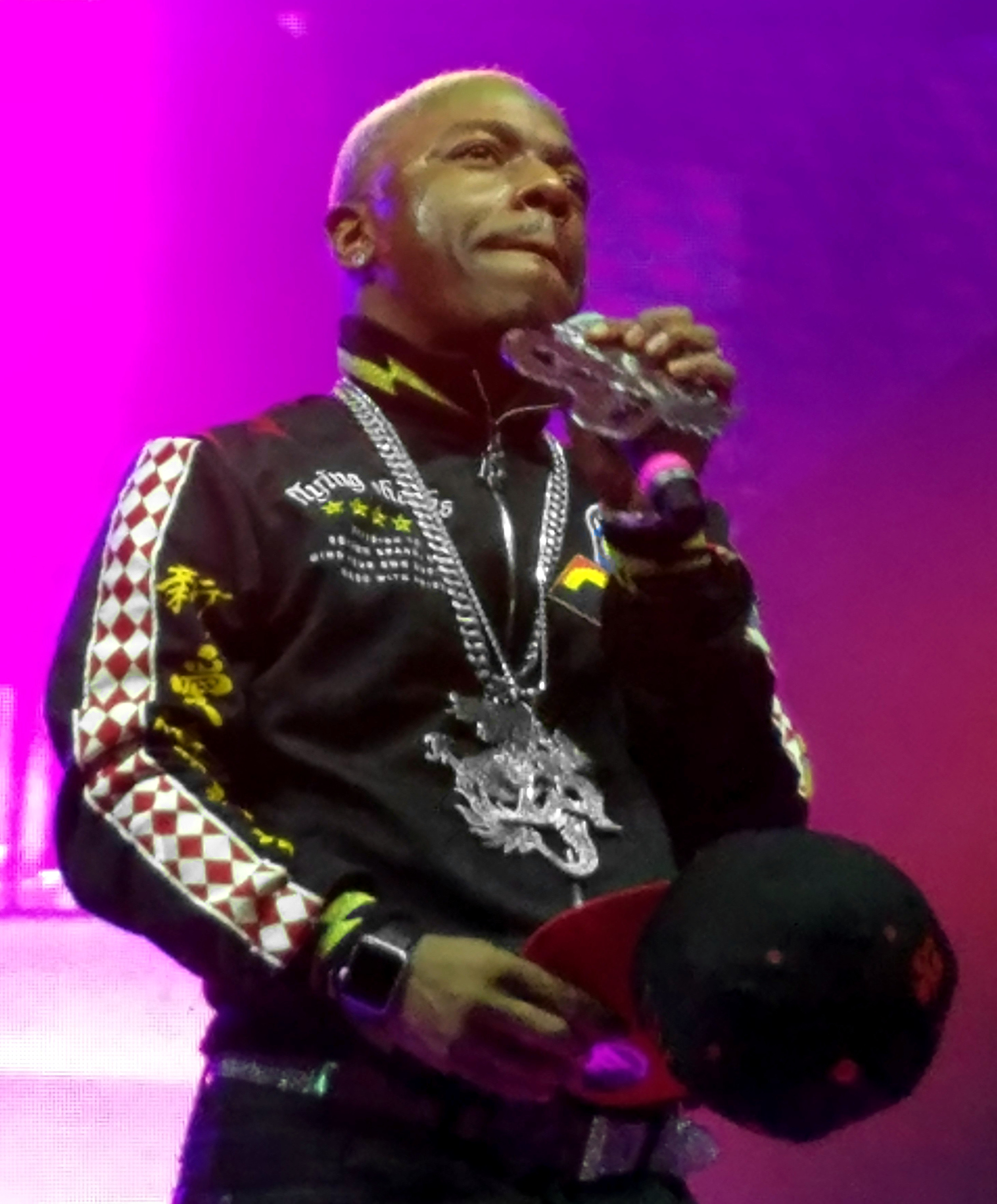
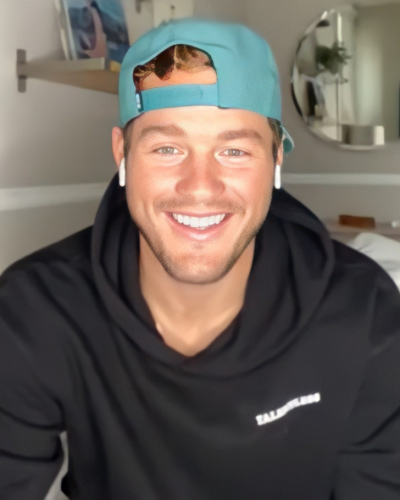
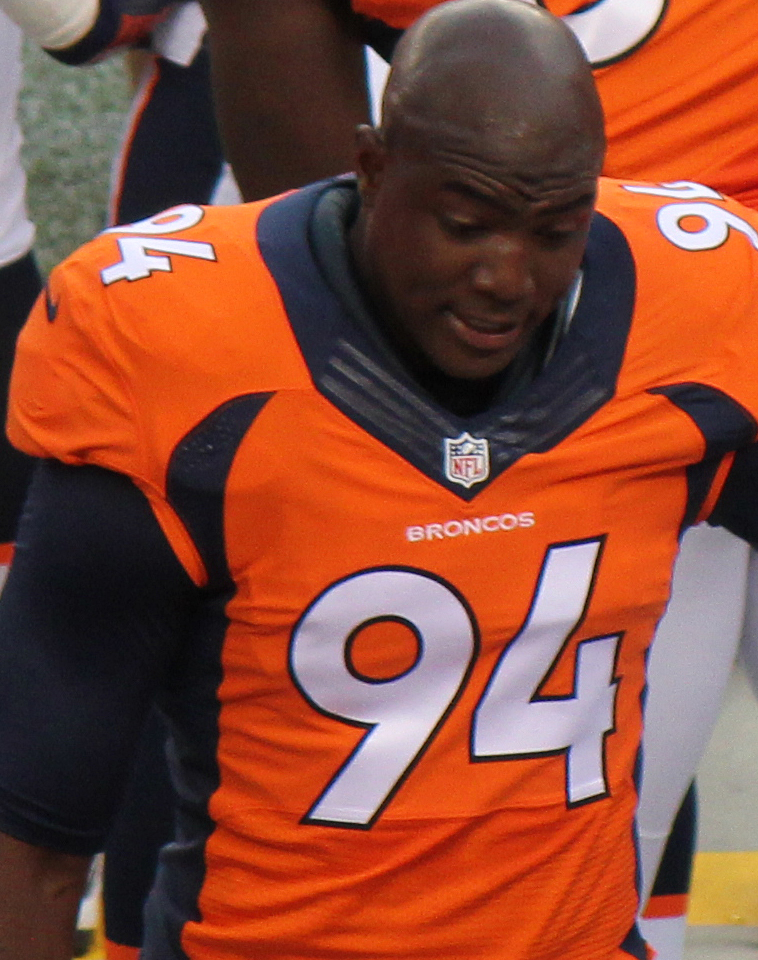
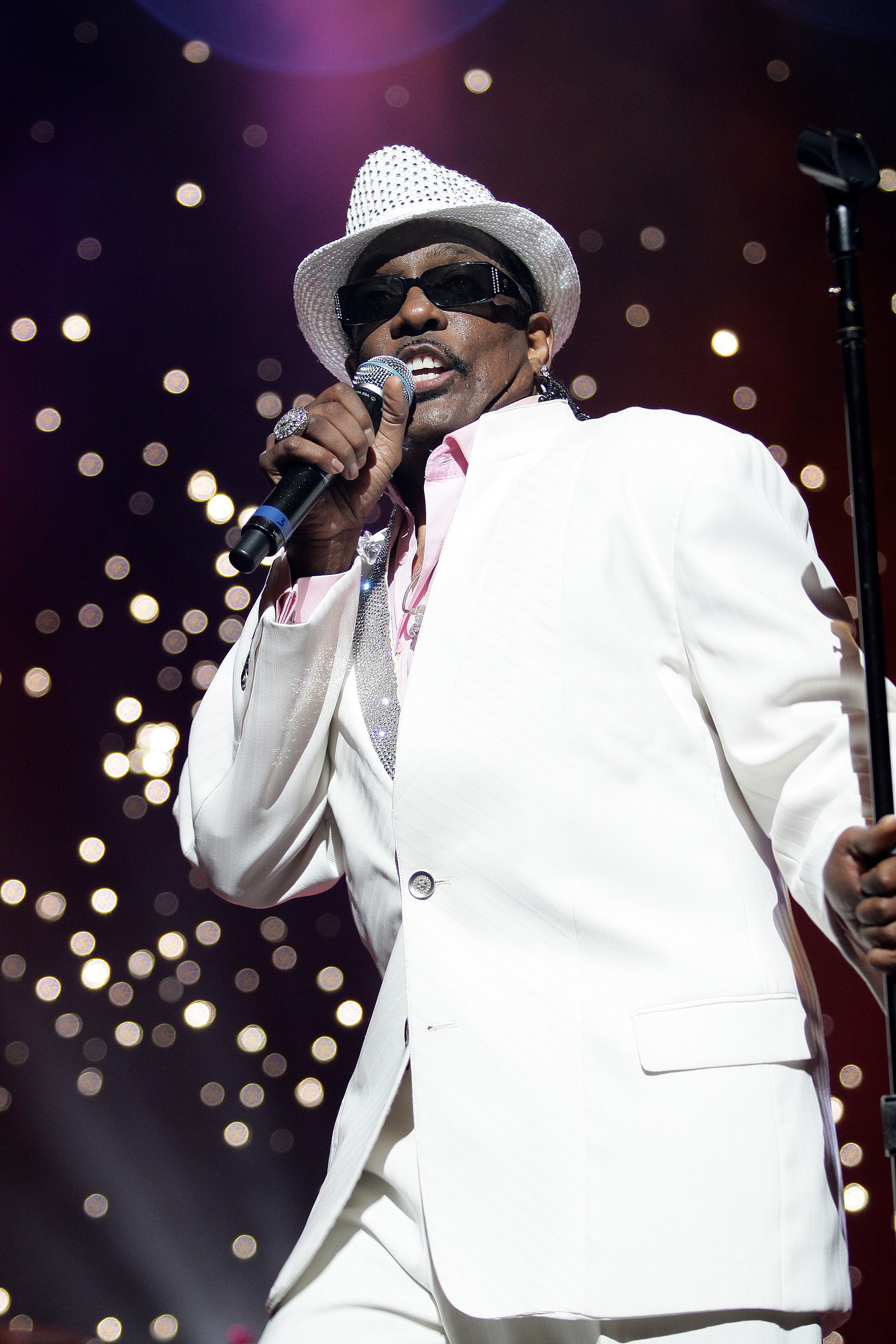
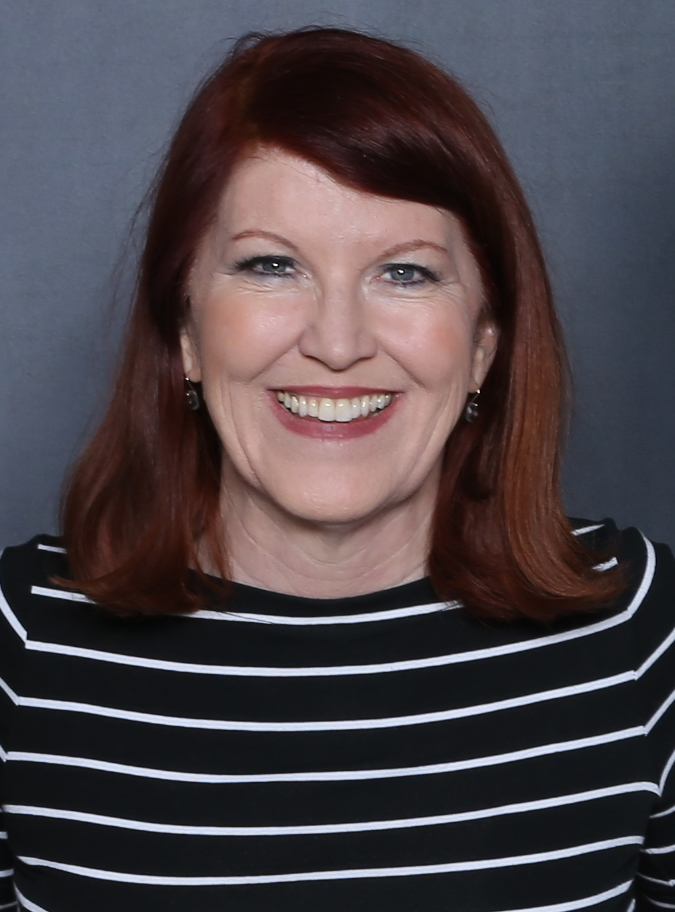
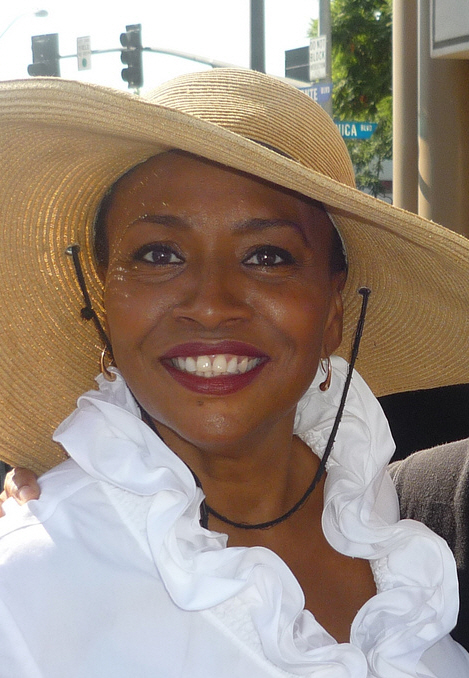
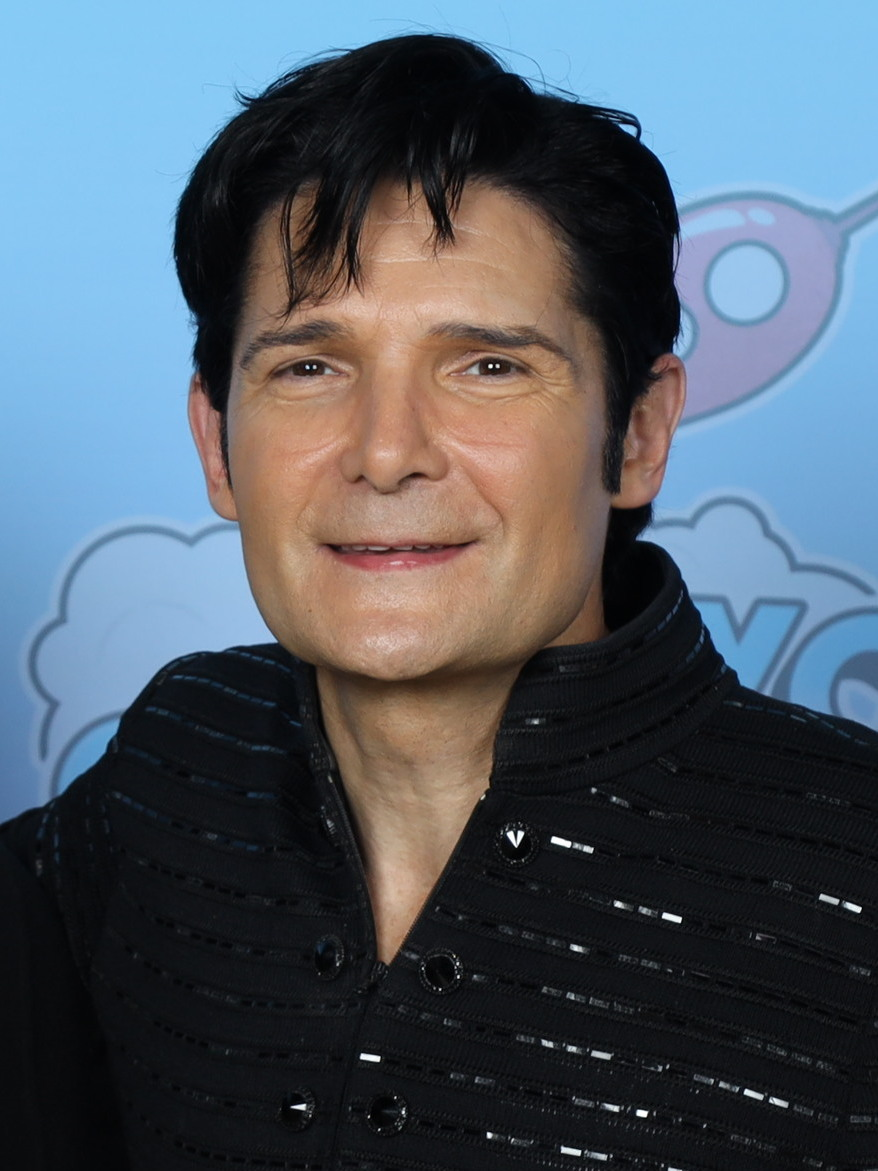
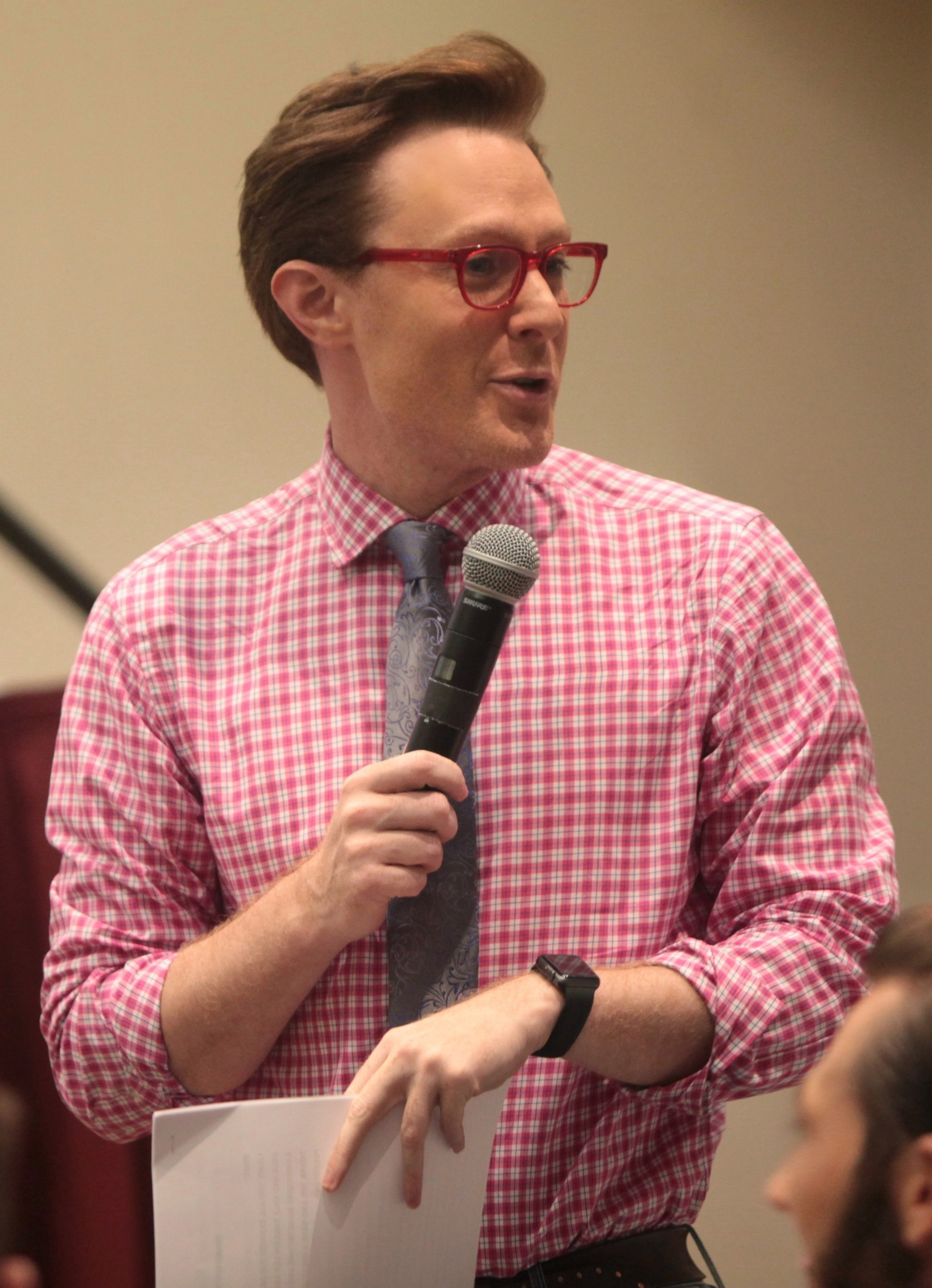
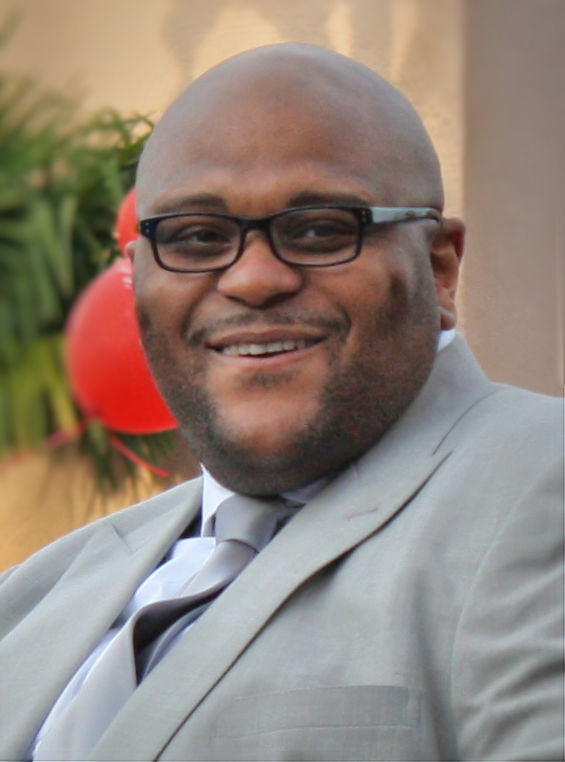
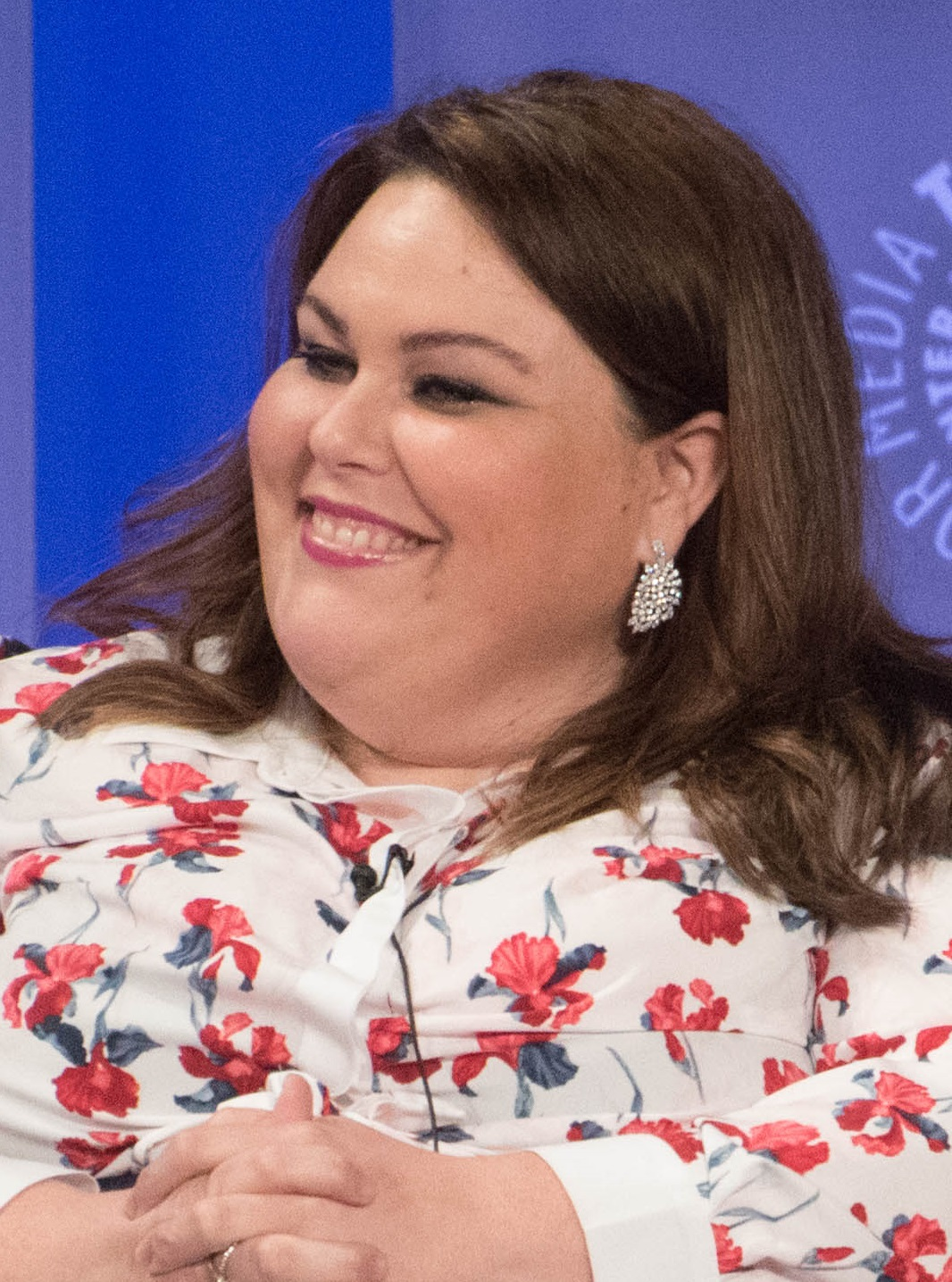
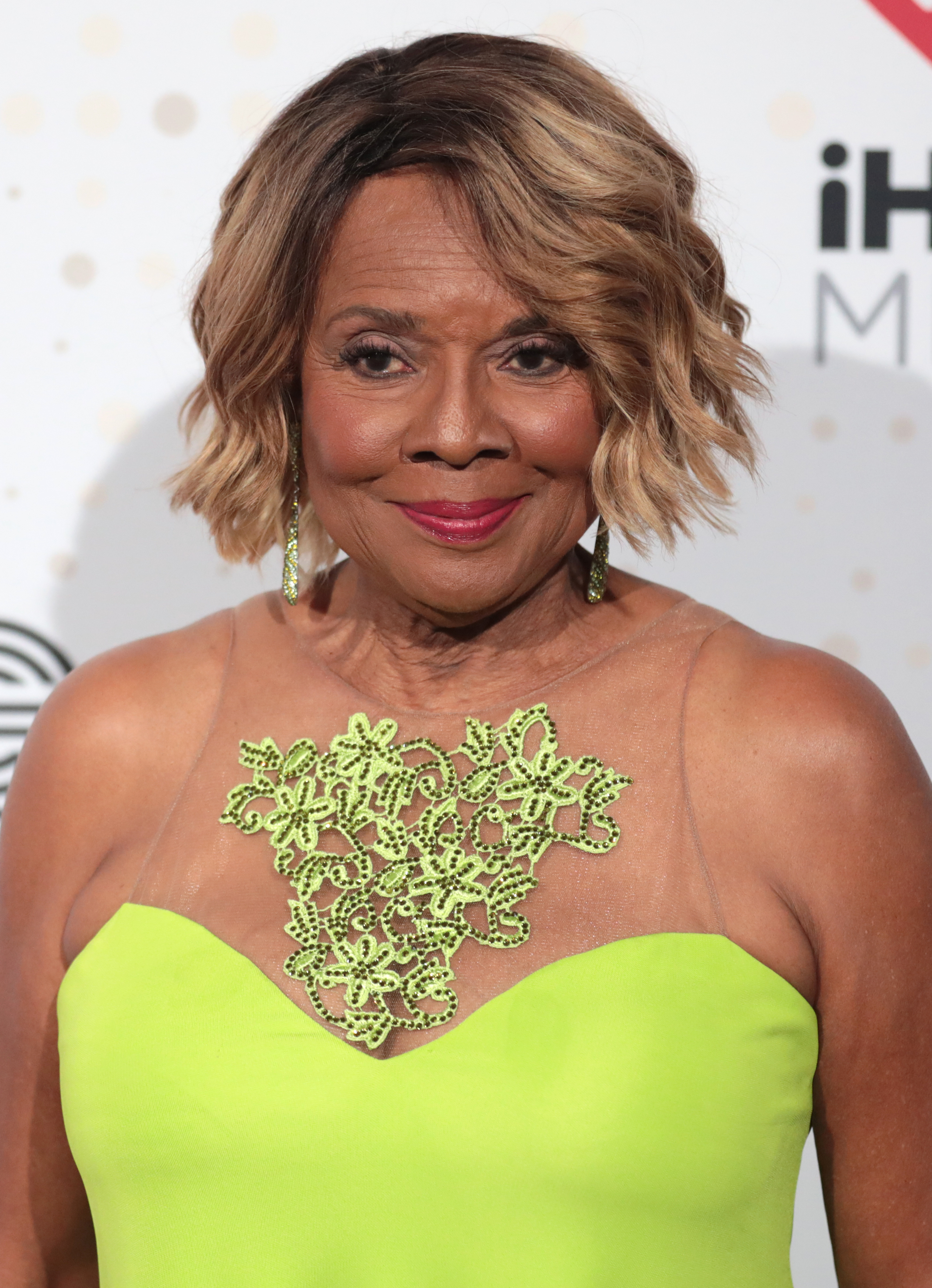
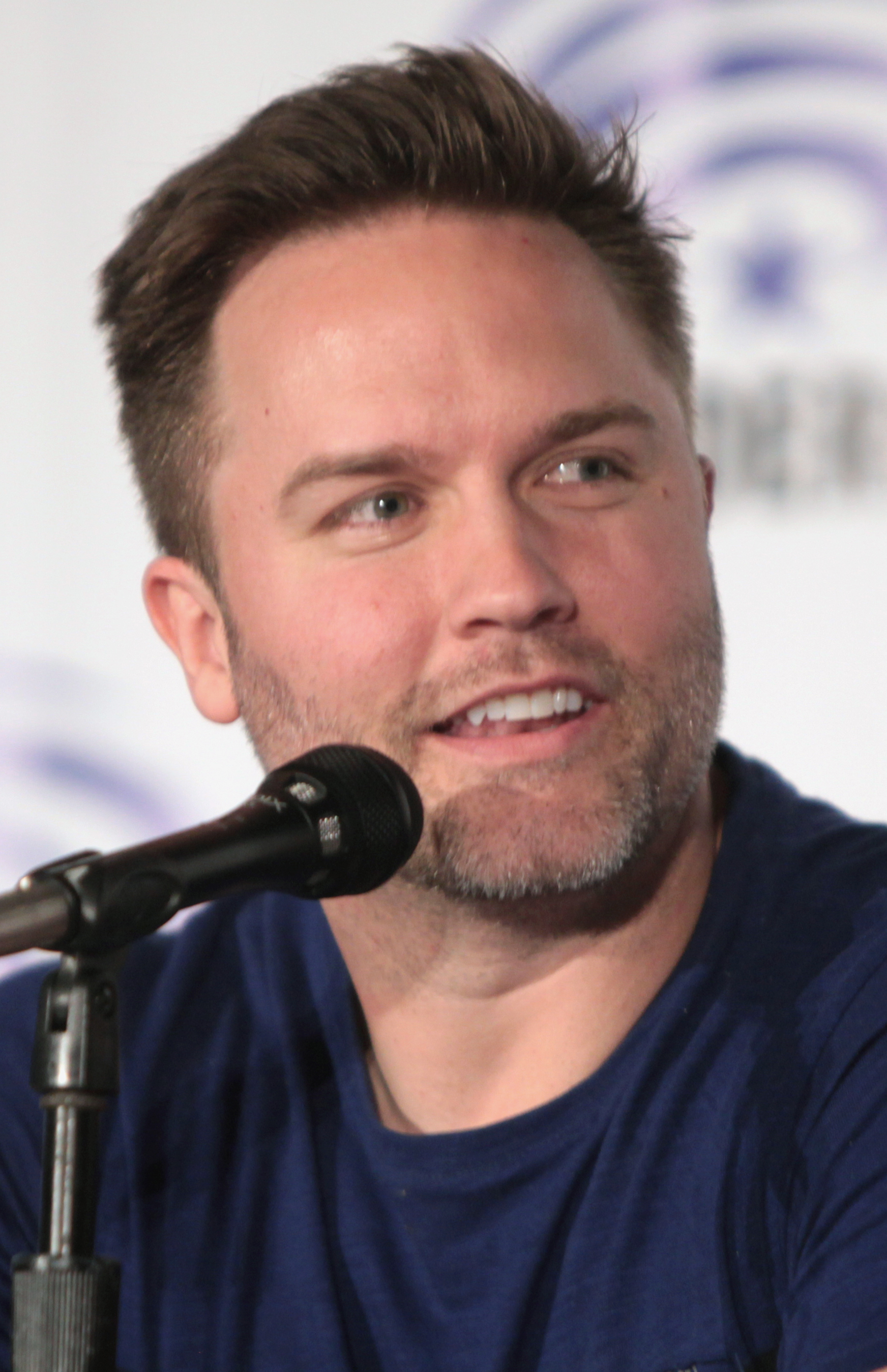
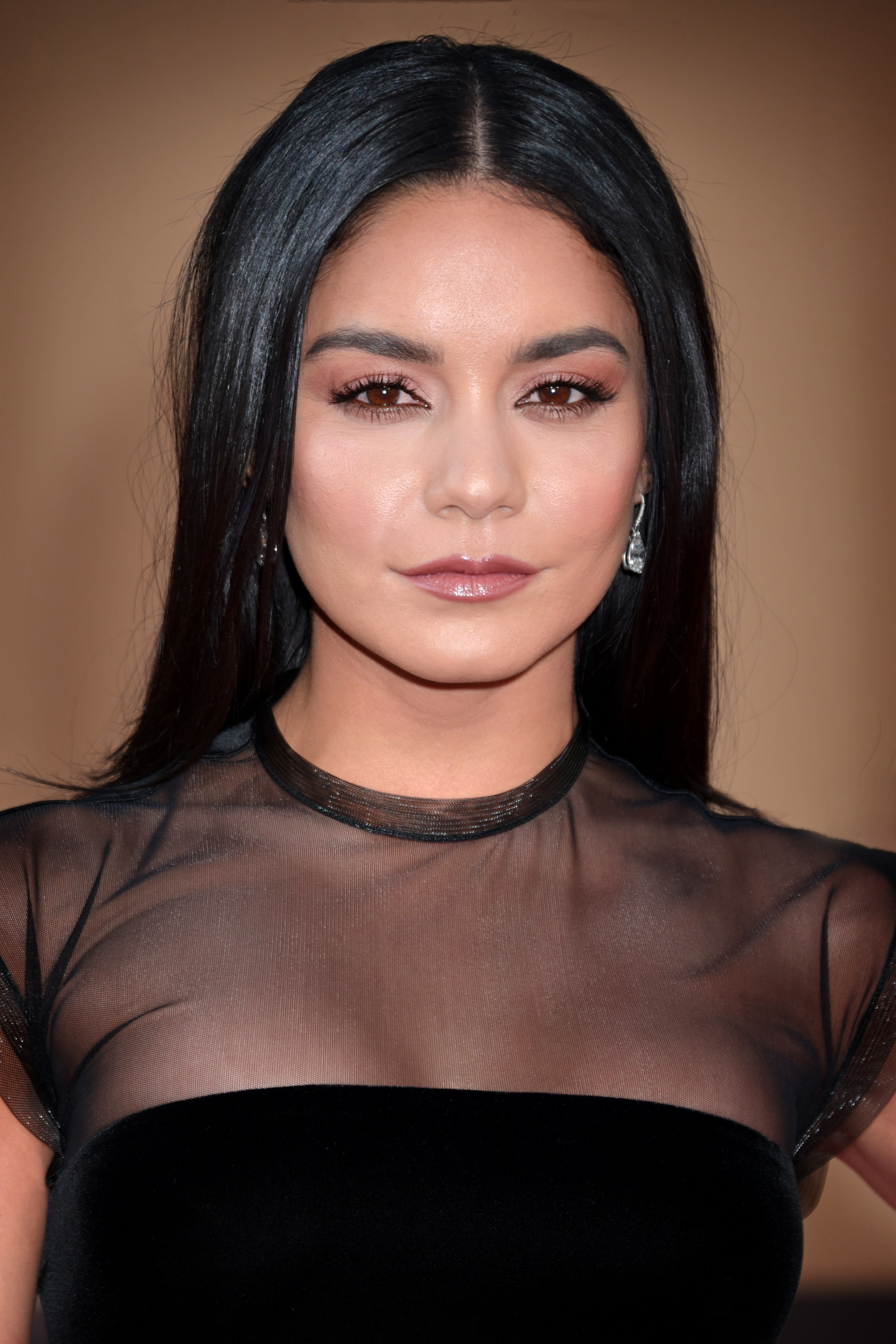
The celebrities who competed in the eleventh season of The Masked Singer, pictured in order of elimination (L–R):
Kevin Hart ("Book"), Savannah Chrisley ("Afghan Hound"), Joe Bastianich ("Spaghetti & Meatballs"), Billy Bush ("Sir Lion"), Sisqó ("Lizard"), Colton Underwood ("Lovebird"), DeMarcus Ware ("Koala"), Charlie Wilson ("Ugly Sweater"), Kate Flannery ("Starfish"), Jenifer Lewis ("Miss Cleocatra"), Corey Feldman ("Seal"), Clay Aiken and Ruben Studdard ("Beets"), Chrissy Metz ("Poodle Moth"), Thelma Houston ("Clock"), Scott Porter ("Gumball"), and Vanessa Hudgens ("Goldfish")

== Episodes ==
=== Week 1 (March 6) - "Season 11 Premiere: Rita We Love Your Ora" ===
Guest performance: Panelist Rita Ora performs "Who Are You" by The Who

Performances on the first episode
#	Stage name	Song	Identity	Result
1	Goldfish	"Vampire" by Olivia Rodrigo	undisclosed	SAFE
2	Starfish	"Material Girl" by Madonna	undisclosed	SAFE
3	Ugly Sweater	"The Best" by Tina Turner	undisclosed	SAFE
4	Lovebird	"Home" by Phillip Phillips	undisclosed	SAFE
5	Book	"So Sick" by Ne-Yo	Kevin Hart	WD

=== Week 2 (March 13) - "Group B Premiere: The Wizard of Oz Night" ===
Guest performance: LeAnn Rimes performs "Over the Rainbow" by Judy Garland

Performances on the second episode
#	Stage name	Song	Result	
1	Gumball	"If I Only Had a Heart" by Jack Haley/"Heartbeat Song" by Kelly Clarkson	RISK	
2	Miss Cleocatra	"Stormy Weather" by Etta James	SAFE	
3	Afghan Hound	"The Lion Sleeps Tonight" by The Tokens	RISK	
4	Beets	"Home" by Michael Bublé	SAFE	
Smackdown			Identity	Result
5	Afghan Hound	"Ding-Dong! The Witch Is Dead" by Harold Arlen and Yip Harburg	Savannah Chrisley	OUT
5	Gumball	"Ding-Dong! The Witch Is Dead" by Harold Arlen and Yip Harburg	undisclosed	SAFE

=== Week 3 (March 20) - "Group C Premiere: Billy Joel Night" ===
Guest performance: Panelist Robin Thicke performs "My Life"

Performances on the third episode
#	Stage name	Billy Joel song	Result	
1	Poodle Moth	"Just the Way You Are"	SAFE	
2	Clock	"Piano Man"	SAFE	
3	Spaghetti & Meatballs	"Only the Good Die Young"	RISK	
4	Lizard	"Uptown Girl"	RISK	
Smackdown			Identity	Result
5	Spaghetti & Meatballs	"Movin' Out (Anthony's Song)"	Joe Bastianich	OUT
5	Lizard	"Movin' Out (Anthony's Song)"	undisclosed	SAFE

=== Week 4 (March 27) - "TV Theme Night" ===
Guest performance: The panel performs "The Ballad of Gilligan's Isle" by Sherwood Schwartz and George Wyle (from Gilligan's Island)

Performances on the fourth episode
#	Stage name	Song	Result	
1	Clock	"Good Times Theme Song"	SAFE	
2	Poodle Moth	"Unwritten" - The Hills theme song	SAFE	
3	Lizard	"Scooby-Doo, Where Are You? Theme Song"	RISK	
Wild card	Sir Lion	"Love and Marriage" - Married… with Children theme song	RISK	
Smackdown			Identity	Result
5	Lizard	"Who Are You" - The Masked Singer theme song	undisclosed	SAFE
5	Sir Lion	"Who Are You" - The Masked Singer theme song	Billy Bush	OUT

=== Week 5 (April 3) - "Group C Finals: Shower Anthems Night" ===
Group performance: "Shower" by Becky G

Performances on the fifth episode
#	Stage name	Song	Identity	Result
1	Clock	"Respect" by Aretha Franklin	undisclosed	SAFE
2	Lizard	"Bring Me to Life" by Evanescence	Sisqó	OUT
3	Poodle Moth	"The House That Built Me" by Miranda Lambert	undisclosed	SAFE
Battle Royale
4	Clock	"Ain't No Mountain High Enough" by Marvin Gaye and Tammi Terrell	undisclosed	WIN
4	Poodle Moth	"Ain't No Mountain High Enough" by Marvin Gaye and Tammi Terrell	undisclosed	KEPT

- After being unmasked, Sisqó sang his signature song "Thong Song" as his encore performance.

=== Week 6 (April 10) - "Transformers Night" ===
Performances on the sixth episode
#	Stage name	Song	Identity	Result
1	Starfish	"21 Guns" by Green Day (from Transformers: Revenge of the Fallen)	undisclosed	SAFE
2	Ugly Sweater	"Brick House" by Commodores (from Transformers: Revenge of the Fallen)	undisclosed	SAFE
3	Lovebird	"All That You Are" by Goo Goo Dolls (from Transformers: Dark of the Moon)	Colton Underwood	OUT
4	Goldfish	"Baby Come Back" by Player (from Transformers)	undisclosed	SAFE
Wild card	Koala	"Everybody Wants to Rule the World" by Tears for Fears (from Bumblebee)	DeMarcus Ware	OUT

=== Week 7 (April 17) - "Group A Finals: Queen Night" ===
Group performance: "We Are the Champions"

Performances on the seventh episode
#	Stage name	Queen song	Identity	Result
1	Ugly Sweater	"I Want to Break Free"	Charlie Wilson	OUT
2	Starfish	"Under Pressure" (with David Bowie)	undisclosed	SAFE
3	Goldfish	"The Show Must Go On"	undisclosed	SAFE
Battle Royale
4	Goldfish	"Another One Bites the Dust"	undisclosed	WIN
4	Starfish	"Another One Bites the Dust"	Kate Flannery	OUT

- After being unmasked, Wilson sang The Gap Band's "You Dropped a Bomb on Me" as his encore performance.

=== Week 8 (April 24) - "Girl Group Night" ===
Guest performance: The panel performs "Wannabe" by Spice Girls

Performances on the eighth episode
#	Stage name	Song	Result	
1	Miss Cleocatra	"Free Your Mind" by En Vogue	RISK	
2	Beets	"I'm So Excited" by The Pointer Sisters	SAFE	
3	Gumball	"Wide Open Spaces" by The Chicks	SAFE	
Wild card	Seal	"Hold On" by Wilson Phillips	RISK	
Smackdown			Identity	Result
5	Miss Cleocatra	"Waterfalls" by TLC	Jenifer Lewis	OUT
5	Seal	"Waterfalls" by TLC	undisclosed	SAFE

=== Week 9 (May 1) - "Group B Finals: Soundtrack Of My Life" ===
Group performance: "It's My Life" by Bon Jovi

Performances on the ninth episode
#	Stage name	Song	Identity	Result
1	Beets	"One Moment in Time" by Whitney Houston	undisclosed	SAFE
1	Beets	"One Moment in Time" by Whitney Houston	undisclosed	SAFE
2	Seal	"It's Tricky" by Run-D.M.C.	Corey Feldman	OUT
3	Gumball	"Carry On Wayward Son" by Kansas	undisclosed	SAFE
Battle Royale
4	Beets	"(I've Had) The Time of My Life" by Bill Medley and Jennifer Warnes	Clay Aiken	OUT
4	Beets	"(I've Had) The Time of My Life" by Bill Medley and Jennifer Warnes	Ruben Studdard	OUT
4	Gumball	"(I've Had) The Time of My Life" by Bill Medley and Jennifer Warnes	undisclosed	WIN

=== Week 10 (May 8) - "Quarter Finals: Final Four" ===
Performances on the tenth episode
#	Stage name	Song	Result	
1	Clock	"Get on Your Feet" by Gloria Estefan	SAFE	
2	Gumball	"I'm Yours" by Jason Mraz	RISK	
3	Poodle Moth	"Price Tag" by Jessie J ft. B.o.B	RISK	
4	Goldfish	"Unforgettable" by Nat King Cole	SAFE	
Smackdown			Identity	Result
5	Poodle Moth	"If I Could Turn Back Time" by Cher	Chrissy Metz	OUT
5	Gumball	"If I Could Turn Back Time" by Cher	undisclosed	SAFE

=== Week 11 (May 15) - "Road To The Semi-Finals" and "Semi-Finals: Then There Were Three" ===
Performances on the eleventh episode
#	Stage name	Song
1	Goldfish	"Let's Stay Together" by Al Green
2	Gumball	"Go the Distance" by Michael Bolton
3	Clock	"We Are Family" by Sister Sledge

Group performance: "Higher Love" by Kygo feat. Whitney Houston

Performances on the twelfth episode
#	Stage name	Song	Identity	Result
1	Gumball	"I Lived" by OneRepublic	undisclosed	SAFE
2	Clock	"Dancing in the Street" by Martha and the Vandellas	Thelma Houston	OUT
3	Goldfish	"You Oughta Know" by Alanis Morissette	undisclosed	SAFE
Battle Royale	"A Moment Like This" by Kelly Clarkson			

- After being unmasked, Houston performed her signature song "Don't Leave Me This Way".

=== Week 12 (May 22) - "Finale: One Mask Takes It All" ===
Performances on the thirteenth episode
#	Stage name	Song	Identity	Result
1	Gumball	"Latch" by Disclosure ft. Sam Smith	Scott Porter	RUNNER-UP
1	Gumball	"Renegade" by Styx	Scott Porter	RUNNER-UP
2	Goldfish	"Heart of Glass" by Blondie	Vanessa Hudgens	WINNER
2	Goldfish	"Don't Let the Sun Go Down on Me" by Elton John	Vanessa Hudgens	WINNER

== Ratings ==
Viewership and ratings per episode of The Masked Singer (American TV series) season 11
No.	Title	Air date	Timeslot (ET)	Rating/share (18–49)	Viewers (millions)	Ref.
1	"Season 11 Premiere: Rita We Love Your Ora"	March 6, 2024	Wednesday 8:00 p.m.	0.4/5	3.29	
2	"Group B Premiere: The Wizard of Oz Night"	March 13, 2024	Wednesday 8:00 p.m.	0.4/5	3.44	
3	"Group C Premiere: Billy Joel Night"	March 20, 2024	Wednesday 8:00 p.m.	0.4/5	3.19	
4	"TV Theme Night"	March 27, 2024	Wednesday 8:00 p.m.	0.4/5	3.24	
5	"Group C Finals: Shower Anthems Night"	April 3, 2024	Wednesday 8:00 p.m.	0.4/5	3.36	
6	"Transformers Night"	April 10, 2024	Wednesday 8:00 p.m.	0.5/6	3.43	
7	"Group A Finals: Queen Night"	April 17, 2024	Wednesday 8:00 p.m.	0.4/5	3.44	
8	"Girl Group Night"	April 24, 2024	Wednesday 8:00 p.m.	0.4/5	3.41	
9	"Group B Finals: Soundtrack Of My Life"	May 1, 2024	Wednesday 8:00 p.m.	0.4/5	2.95	
10	"Quarter Finals: Final Four"	May 8, 2024	Wednesday 8:00 p.m.	0.4/4	3.01	
11	"Road To The Semi-Finals"	May 15, 2024	Wednesday 8:00 p.m.	0.4/4	2.77	
12	"Semi-Finals: Then There Were Three"	May 15, 2024	Wednesday 9:00 p.m.	0.4/4	2.91	
13	"Finale: One Mask Takes It All"	May 22, 2024	Wednesday 8:00 p.m.	0.4/4	2.99	
