= Stand Up (Dave Matthews Band album) =

Studio album by Dave Matthews Band
- Released: May 10, 2005
- Studio: Haunted Hollow (Charlottesville)
- Genres: Alternative rock; folk rock
- Length: 56:24
- Label: RCA
- Producer: Mark Batson

Dave Matthews Band chronology
The Gorge (2004)	Stand Up (2005)	Weekend on the Rocks (2005)

Studio albums chronology
Busted Stuff (2002)	Stand Up (2005)	Big Whiskey & the GrooGrux King (2009)

Singles from Stand Up
- 1. "American Baby" Released: March 28, 2005

Professional ratings
Aggregate scores
Source	Rating
Metacritic	63/100
Review scores
Source	Rating
AllMusic	2/5 stars
Blender	3/5 stars
E!	A−
Entertainment Weekly	A−
Los Angeles Times	2.5/4 stars
Now	3/5 stars
Rolling Stone	3.5/5 stars
Slant Magazine	3.5/5 stars
USA Today	3/4 stars

Stand Up is the sixth studio album by the American rock band Dave Matthews Band. It was released on May 10, 2005, through RCA Records. The album was primarily recorded at Haunted Hollow Studio in Charlottesville, Virginia and was the band's first album to be produced by Mark Batson. It is the band's last album to feature full participation from saxophonist LeRoi Moore before his death in 2008.

Stand Up was a commercial success, becoming the band's fourth consecutive album to reach number one on the Billboard 200. The album spawned one single, "American Baby", and it became their highest-charting song, peaking at number 16 on the Billboard Hot 100. Three other songs from the album—"Dreamgirl", "Everybody Wake Up (Our Finest Hour Arrives)", and "Smooth Rider"—were released as promotional singles. Critical reception was positive, with many praising the band's ability to update its sound with elements of soul and funk.

== Background ==
In late 2004, Dave Matthews Band returned to their studio in Charlottesville, Virginia. Having decided they wanted to take some chances and pursue a funkier side to their music, A&R Bruce Flohr had tracked down a new producer in Mark Batson. According to Flohr in an interview with HitQuarters, "When the band and him (sic) got together it was instant creative karma. Things took off like a bat out of hell."

== Release and promotion ==
Prior to the album's release, Dave Matthews Band published a website showcasing video clips from the production of the album with commentary by producer Mark Batson. Additionally, VH1 streamed the album in its entirety before the official release.

The album was in CD format, DualDisc format (one side CD, one side DVD-Video), and as a digital download from the band's website or iTunes Music Store.

== Track listing ==
All songs by Dave Matthews Band and Mark Batson, except "Hello Again" by Dave Matthews Band.

Stand Up
No.	Title	Length
1.	"Dreamgirl"	4:01
2.	"Old Dirt Hill (Bring That Beat Back)"	5:00
3.	"Stand Up (For It)"	4:13
4.	"American Baby Intro"	2:03
5.	"American Baby"	4:35
6.	"Smooth Rider"	2:17
7.	"Everybody Wake Up (Our Finest Hour Arrives)"	4:17
8.	"Out of My Hands"	3:41
9.	"Hello Again"	3:56
10.	"Louisiana Bayou"	5:36
11.	"Stolen Away on 55th & 3rd"	4:17
12.	"You Might Die Trying"	4:44
13.	"Steady as We Go"	3:22
14.	"Hunger for the Great Light"	4:20
Total length:		56:24

== Personnel ==
Dave Matthews Band

- Carter Beauford – drums, percussion (1, 2, 7, 11), vocals (2, 3)
- Stefan Lessard – bass guitar, guitar (14), vocals (3)
- Dave Matthews – vocals (1–3, 5–14), guitar (1–7, 9–14), piano (4, 8)
- LeRoi Moore – tenor saxophone (1, 3–5, 7, 9, 11–14), baritone saxophone (5, 7, 12, 13), soprano saxophone (1), vocals (3), pyrotechnics (5)
- Boyd Tinsley – violin (1–4, 9–11, 13, 14), electric violin (5, 7, 12), mandolin (7), vocals (3)

Additional musicians

- Mark Batson – piano (1, 2, 4, 6, 13), organ (5, 6, 10, 12, 13), keyboards (1, 3), Moog synthesizer (5, 14), Fender Rhodes piano (2), Mellotron (7), vocals (7), percussion (7), clavinet (10), synthesizers (11), Wurlitzer organ (12), string arrangements and conducting (1, 2, 7, 14)
- Ann Marie Calhoun – violin (1, 2, 7, 14)
- Sue Dench – viola (4)
- Lee Grove – additional percussion (1)
- Jennifer Myer – viola (1, 2, 7, 14)
- Leo Payne – violin (4)
- Audrey Riley – cello (1, 2, 4, 7, 14), string arrangements (4)
- Mira Stone – violin (1, 2, 7, 14)
- Butch Taylor – piano (1, 2), Fender Rhodes piano (7, 11), Wurlitzer electric piano (2, 10), organ (7, 9, 14), keyboards (1), background vocals (12, 14)

Technical personnel

- Mark Batson – producer, engineer (1–8, 10–14)
- Danny Clinch – photography
- Alex Dromgal – mixing assistant (1, 3, 10, 13)
- Dave Emery – mixing assistant (1, 3, 10, 13)
- Rob Evans – assistant engineer (2–4, 6–14), engineer (1, 5)
- Aaron Fessel – engineer (4)
- Brian Gardner – mastering
- Serban Ghenea – mixing (2, 4, 5, 6, 7, 9, 11, 12, 14)
- Lee Grove – additional programming (1, 3, 10, 13)
- John Hanes – additional Pro Tools engineer
- Wyndsor Taggart Hug – art direction, design
- Thane Kerner – art direction, design
- Chris Kress – engineer
- Brian Malouf – additional pre-production
- Kevin Mahoney – assistant mixing 5, 6, 11, 12, 14)
- Tim Roberts – mixing assistant (2, 4, 5, 6, 7, 9, 11, 12, 14)
- Mark "Spike" Stent – mixing (1, 3, 10, 13)

== Charts ==
=== Weekly charts ===
Chart (2005)	Peak position
Australian Albums (ARIA)	16
Canadian Albums (Billboard)	3
New Zealand Albums (RMNZ)	35
US Billboard 200	1

=== Year-end charts ===
Chart (2005)	Position
US Billboard 200	36
