= Last Dragon =

Studio album by Sisqó
- Released: February 10, 2015
- Recorded: 2011–2014
- Genre: R&B, hip hop
- Label: Massenburg Media, Dragon Music

Sisqó chronology
Return of Dragon (2001)	Last Dragon (2015)	Genesis EP (2019)

Singles from Last Dragon
- 1. "A-List" Released: October 1, 2014; 2. "LIPs" Released: November 10, 2014

Last Dragon is the third solo studio album by American R&B singer Sisqó of Dru Hill, released on February 10, 2015, by Massenburg Media and Sisqo's imprint, Dragon Music.

== Background ==
In 2012, during a performance in Doha, Sisqó announced he was working on his third album. On December 10, Sisqó announced on his Twitter account that those who pre-order Last Dragon will be entitled to an instant download of the track "Round & Round". Sisqó expressed an interest in working with R. Kelly on the album.

== Track listing ==
No.	Title	Writer(s)	Producer(s)	Length
1.	"Last Dragon"	K. Moore, L. Hill, M. Andrews, R. Shelton, K. Veney	One Up Entertainment	1:31
2.	"A-List" (featuring Waka Flocka Flame)	Juaquin Malphurs, Raymond Murdock, Mark Andrews, Kevin Veney	One Up Entertainment, Murdock (co.)	3:56
3.	"Find Out"	K. Moore, L. Hill, M. Andrews, R. Shelton, K. Veney	One Up Entertainment	3:37
4.	"Monsta"	K. Moore, L. Hill, M. Andrews, R. Shelton, K. Veney, M. Barney, A. Bennett	One Up Entertainment, District 9 Music	3:15
5.	"LIPS"	K. Moore, L. Hill, M. Andrews, R. Shelton, K. Veney, K. Peck	One Up Entertainment	3:29
6.	"L.G.D.T."	Pier Jones		3:04
7.	"Breathtaker"	Derrick Thompson		3:43
8.	"Round & Round"	K. Moore, L. Hill, M. Andrews, R. Shelton, K. Veney	One Up Entertainment	2:57
9.	"David Blaine"	C. Frith, R. Shelton, M. Andrews, L. Hill, K. Veney, K.G. Miles	One Up Entertainment	3:49
10.	"Victim" (with Dru Hill)	K. Moore, L. Hill, M. Andrews, R. Shelton, K. Veney, R. Murdock, D. Pearson	One Up Entertainment, DP, Murdock	3:38
11.	"Love Spell"	A.M. Carpenter, L. Hill, M. Andrews, R. Shelton, K. Veney, M. Barney, A. Bennett	One Up Entertainment	4:09
12.	"Ipologize"	Wirlie Morris		3:56
