= JCY (group) =

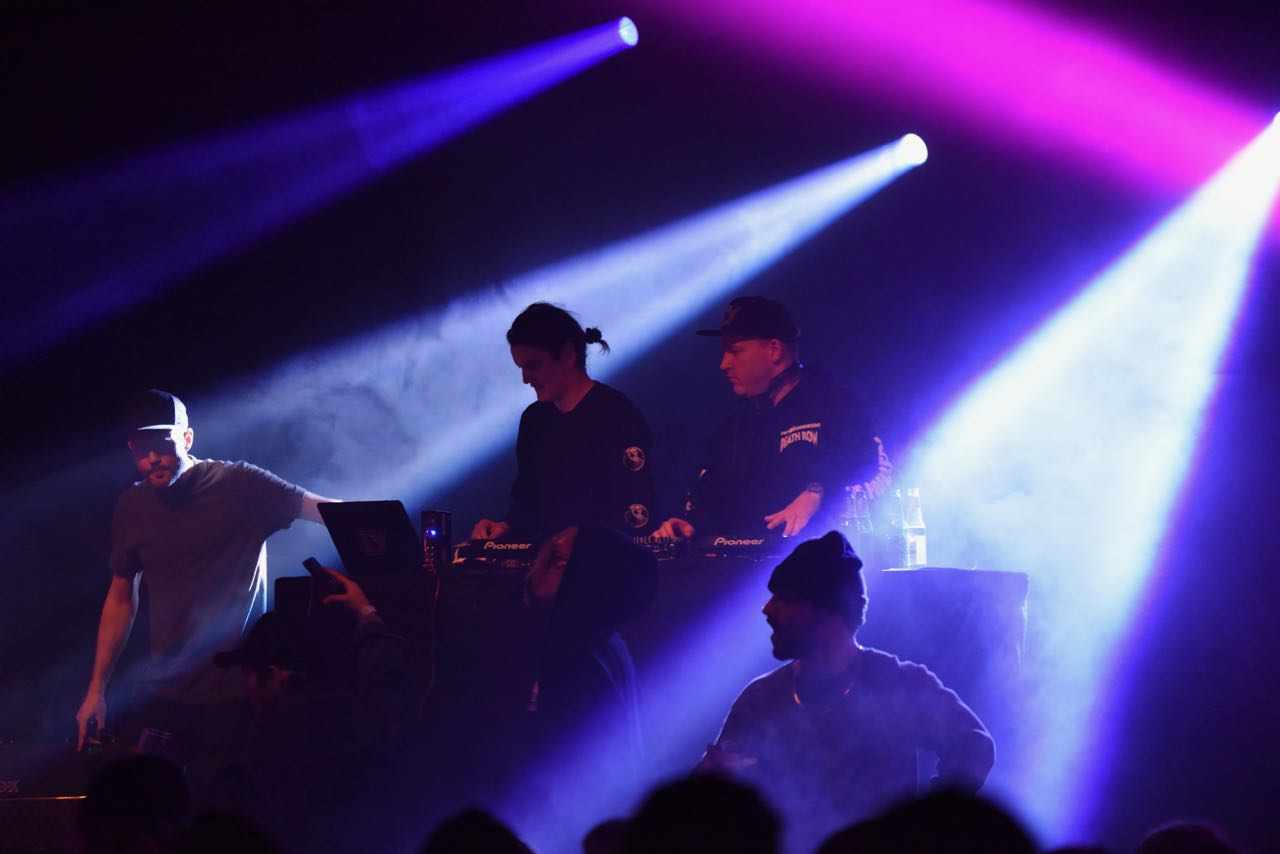
- Left to right Patski Love, RykkinnFella and Chris Stallion

Background information
- Origin: Norway
- Genres: EDM; dance
- Years active: 2016–present
- Labels: Warner Music Norway
- Website: www.facebook.com/jcyprod/

JCY (pronounced Juicy) is a Norwegian production trio made up of the members Patrick "Patski Love" Hauge (born 7 June 1979), Chris "Stallion" Welsh (born 9 June 1984) and Alexander "RykkinnFella" Austheim (born 26 December 1987). They signed with Warner Music Norway in 2016, and released their debut single "Your Way" (featuring Cal) later that year.

== Career ==
=== Background ===
Patrick Hauge had an early interest in music, and signed his first record deal shortly after finishing high school. It was with Lars Larssen Naumann that he created the group Multicyde in 1998. Their song "Not for the Dough" was a huge success, and it was nominated for two awards at the Norwegian Grammys i 1999, Spellemannprisen. The group dissolved in 2001, and shortly after Hauge started working with the Anglo-Norwegian DJ Chris Welsh.

Chris Welsh began producing music from his childhood bedroom, and started his music career through the Norwegian music group Oslo Fluid in 1997. In collaboration with Norwegian rap-group Klovner i Kamp, they founded the label City Connections in 1999. They released their own music through the label until it was closed down in 2004. Welsh rapped on Oslo Fluid's album Cycles of Life from 2000, which was nominated for album of the year in the category dance/hip hop at the Spellemann awards the same year.

In 2004 Hauge and Welsh met, and they created the DJ duo and club concept Juicy. They have hosted sold-out shows all across Scandinavia, Europe and the US for over 12 years, and quickly established themselves at this scene. In 2010 they won an award for their concept through Aftenposten, and have been accompanied by artists like Major Lazer, Snoop Dogg, Lil Jon, Calvin Harris, DJ Mustard and Steve Aoki over the years.

Alexander Austheim did not join the duo until 2016, and they rebranded themselves as JCY. Austheim first made a name for himself as RykkinnFella through creating Russemusikk (party music aimed at high school seniors), as well as remixing and producing for other artists. Among other things he made the track "Fireogtyvegods" with the group Karpe Diem, and the featured album won a Spellemann for best album in the category hip hop in 2008. He has also worked with artists such as Isac Elliot, Bearson, Fatin and Suite 16, and has also been hand picked to participate in Stargate's master class.

==== 2016-present ====
Since the establishment of JCY, the group have played a number of shows in Norway, in addition to releasing their own music. Most notably they performed at X-Games Hafjell 2017 alongside artists like Julie Bergan and TRXD, and have a confirmed booking for Landstreffet i Stavanger 2017 where they will play for the 9th consecutive year.

With a combined background in hip hop, soul, funk, disco, house and pop, the trio makes EDM-pop inspired by many genres. So far they have not put their own vocals on their releases, but have instead collaborated with other artists.

== Discography ==
Singles

- "Your Way" (featuring Cal) (2016)
- "Wasting Your Time" (featuring Alida) (2017)
- "Thong Song" (featuring Sisqo) (2017)
