= Return of Dragon =

Studio album by Sisqó
- Released: June 19, 2001
- Recorded: August 2000 – April 2001
- Genres: R&B, hip hop
- Length: 42:19
- Labels: Def Soul; Island Def Jam
- Producers: Nathan Mooring; Warryn Campbell; Teddy Riley; Pajam; Jason Edmonds; Al West

Sisqó chronology
| Unleash the Dragon (1999) | Return of Dragon (2001) | Last Dragon (2015) |

Singles from Return of Dragon
- 1. "Can I Live" Released: May 8, 2001; 2. "Dance For Me" Released: July 12, 2001

Return of Dragon is the second solo studio album by American R&B recording artist Sisqó of the group Dru Hill. It was released on June 19, 2001 on Def Soul Records. The album did very well on the charts but its singles, "Can I Live" and "Dance for Me", were commercial disappointments compared to his debut album, Unleash the Dragon (1999). Despite the fact that Sisqó announced a third single, "Dream", this never materialized due to the commercial failure of the album. The song "Without You" was originally planned to be featured on Dru Hill's third album, Dru World Order but tensions grew between the group while working on the album and it was put on hold. Return of Dragon was later certified Platinum by the Recording Industry Association of America (RIAA) for excess of one million copies. Return of Dragon would be Sisqó's last album until Last Dragon (2015). After he returned to his group, following the release of this album, Sisqo was dropped from Def Soul Recordings and his group two years later.

== Critical reception ==
Professional ratings
Aggregate scores
| Source | Rating |
|---|---|
| Metacritic | 61/100 |
Review scores
| Source | Rating |
| AllMusic | 3/5 stars |
| Entertainment Weekly | B |
| MTV Asia | 3/5 stars |
| New York Post | 3/4 stars |
| NME | 2.5/5 stars |
| Q | 3/5 stars |
| Robert Christgau | C+ |
| Rolling Stone | 2.5/5 stars |
| Vibe | 3.5/5 stars |

Return of Dragon garnered generally positive reviews from music critics. At Metacritic, which assigns a normalized rating out of 100 to reviews from mainstream critics, the album received an average rating of 61, based on 9 reviews.

David Crowley of Vibe praised the more romantic songs off the album for showcasing Sisqó's vocal abilities, concluding that, "Return of the Dragon largely shows Sisqó's growth as a musician and a man. And you don't even need a thong to enjoy it." AllMusic's Jason Birchmeier commended the record's songwriters and producers for crafting a lean track list that offers catchy singles, calling it "an energetic, slick, and stylish album with plenty of subtle sex and overt gloss — everything early-2000s pop listeners demand in their superstars." He concluded that "In short, Sisqó gives you exactly what you want — assuming you liked his debut album — offering a can't-miss collection of should-be hits and even more of his ceaseless crooning." Tom Sinclair of Entertainment Weekly praised the album's mixture of raunchy sex anthems and sensitive love ballads, calling it "a vast improvement over a debut that felt as artistically flimsy as the subject matter of 'Thong Song'." Barry Walters, writing for Rolling Stone, said that despite the commendable efforts of the producers to experiment with R&B instrumentations, they fall under the weight of studio mixing and Sisqó's shortcomings as a lyricist, calling it "a messy album, one that's instrumentally inventive, melodically underdeveloped, vocally overcooked and lyrically just plain lazy." Victoria Segal of NME was critical of the glossy production and so-called romantic lyrics throughout the record. Britt Robson of The Washington Post also gave a review concluding that "Musically, "Return of Dragon" is much stronger than its predecessor. A phalanx of producers (most notably Al West on "Infatuated," Teddy Riley on "Can I Live" and Nathan "N8" Walton on "Last Night") provides catchy, digitized riffs that give the up-tempo tracks the panoramic sheen of a video game. Sisqo lives up to his end of the bargain with a double-threat blend of stirring R&B vocals and sharp rap cadences. The lyrical content of the tunes and the way they are juxtaposed for maximum stylistic contrast throughout the disc, however, are fickle to a fault and laden with superficial sincerity."; Ending with ""Return of Dragon" is practically destined to move millions of units. Sisqo, who in interviews frequently alludes to his blue-collar upbringing, has a right to be proud of that. Yet to all but his most delusional fans, it's a thoroughly impersonal triumph."

== Track listing ==
Return of Dragon track listing
| No. | Title | Writer(s) | Producer(s) | Length |
|---|---|---|---|---|
| 1. | "Intro" | Nathan Mooring; Jarod Barnes | Jarod B; Boy Genius | 0:52 |
| 2. | "Not Afraid" | Al West; Mark Andrews | West; J.P. Edmund | 2:57 |
| 3. | "Infatuated" | West; Andrews | West; Edmund; Andrews | 3:28 |
| 4. | "Can I Live" (featuring The Dragon Family) | Teddy Riley; Richard Stanard; D'Wayne Jones | Riley | 4:04 |
| 5. | "Without You" (performed by Dru Hill) | James Moss | P.A.J.A.M. | 3:09 |
| 6. | "Homewrecker" | Christopher A. Stewart; Tab Hale; Traci Hale | Tricky Stewart | 3:58 |
| 7. | "Last Night" | Nathan Walton; Tavia Ivey; D'Gregory Craig | N8 | 3:44 |
| 8. | "Close Your Eyes" (Interlude) | Mooring; Barnes | Jarod B; Boy Genius | 1:12 |
| 9. | "Close Your Eyes" | Andrews; Mooring; Barnes | Jarod B; Boy Genius | 4:27 |
| 10. | "Dance for Me" | Marquis Collins; Andrews; Rich Shelton; Loren Hill; Kevin Veney; James Travis | One Up | 4:10 |
| 11. | "Off the Corner" (featuring The Associates) | Collins; Andrews; Shelton; Hill; Veney; Travis; D'Wayne Jones; Clifton Beaufort | One Up | 5:40 |
| 12. | "Dream" (featuring Chinky) | Warryn Campbell; Jason Edmonds | Campbell; Edmonds | 4:46 |

Japanese bonus track
| No. | Title | Writer(s) | Producer(s) | Length |
|---|---|---|---|---|
| 13. | "You Don't Know Me" (featuring LovHer) | West; Andrews | West | 3:09 |

== Charts ==
=== Weekly charts ===
Weekly chart performance for Return of Dragon
| Chart (2001) | Peak position |
|---|---|
| Australian Albums (ARIA) | 52 |
| Australian Urban Albums (ARIA) | 8 |
| Belgian Albums (Ultratop Flanders) | 39 |
| Belgian Albums (Ultratop Wallonia) | 22 |
| Canadian Albums (Nielsen SoundScan) | 44 |
| Canadian R&B Albums (Nielsen SoundScan) | 18 |
| Dutch Albums (Album Top 100) | 27 |
| European Top 100 Albums (Music & Media) | 40 |
| French Albums (SNEP) | 32 |
| German Albums (Offizielle Top 100) | 22 |
| Japanese Albums (Oricon) | 31 |
| Scottish Albums (Official Charts) | 62 |
| Swiss Albums (Schweizer Hitparade) | 17 |
| UK Albums (Official Charts) | 22 |
| UK R&B Albums (Official Charts) | 7 |
| US Billboard 200 | 7 |
| US Top R&B/Hip-Hop Albums (Billboard) | 3 |

=== Year-end charts ===
Year-end chart performance for Return of Dragon
| Chart (2001) | Position |
|---|---|
| Canadian R&B Albums (Nielsen SoundScan) | 88 |
| US Top R&B/Hip-Hop Albums (Billboard) | 94 |

== Certifications ==
Certifications for Return of Dragon
| Region | Certification | Certified units/sales |
|---|---|---|
| United Kingdom (BPI) | Silver | 60,000^{^} |
| United States (RIAA) | Platinum | 1,000,000^{^} |
^{^} Shipments figures based on certification alone.
