= Everybody Wake Up (Our Finest Hour Arrives) =

Single by Dave Matthews Band

from the album Stand Up
- Released: 2006
- Recorded: Haunted Hollow Studio, Charlottesville, Virginia
- Genre: Rock
- Length: 4:17
- Label: RCA
- Songwriters: Mark Batson, Carter Beauford, Stefan Lessard, Dave Matthews, LeRoi Moore, Boyd Tinsley
- Producer: Mark Batson

Dave Matthews Band singles chronology
"Dreamgirl" (2005)	"Everybody Wake Up (Our Finest Hour Arrives)" (2006)	"Smooth Rider" (2006)

"Everybody Wake Up (Our Finest Hour Arrives)" is a song recorded and performed by the Dave Matthews Band from their sixth studio album studio album, Stand Up (2005). The song was released as the third radio single in support of the album.

== Track listing ==
American radio promo

1. "Everybody Wake Up (Our Finest Hour Arrives)" (album version) – 4:17

== Charts ==
Chart (2005)	Peak position
US Adult Alternative Airplay (Billboard)	11

== Personnel ==
- Carter Beauford – drums, percussion
- Stefan Lessard – bass
- Dave Matthews – vocals, guitar
- LeRoi Moore – tenor and baritone saxophones
- Boyd Tinsley – electric violin, mandolin
- Butch Taylor – Rhodes, organ
- Mark Batson – Mellotron, vocals, percussion
