= Genesis EP =

EP by Sisqó
- Released: November 29, 2019
- Recorded: Summer 2019
- Genres: R&B, hip hop
- Length: 14:59
- Label: Dragon Music Group
- Producer: Don Trunk

Sisqó chronology
Last Dragon (2015)	Genesis EP (2019)

Genesis EP is the second EP by American R&B recording artist Sisqó, released on November 29, 2019, under Dragon Music Group to celebrate the 20th anniversary of the release of his debut solo album, Unleash the Dragon.

== Background ==
The album was confirmed in early November 2019 while Sisqó was touring Australia during the RNB Fridays Live festival that the album would be released on Black Friday.

Sisqó performed Drag/On as part of his set and solo performance while touring with Dru Hill leading up to the release.

== Track listing ==
No.	Title	Writer(s)	Producer(s)	Length
1.	"Drag/On"	Don Trunk	Don Trunk	3:33
2.	"Bend Down"			4:27
3.	"Round & Round"	K. Moore, L. Hill, M. Andrews, R. Shelton, K. Veney	One Up Entertainment	2:58
4.	"Baby Girl" (featuring Bossman)		Rod Lee	4:01

== Release history ==
Region	Date	Label	Format
Worldwide	November 29, 2019	Dragon Music Group	Download
