= Omar Wilson =

American singer

Omar Wilson is an American R&B artist from Norwalk, Connecticut.

== Career ==
Wilson has been performing since the age of six, where his solo performances at Norwalk's Calvary Baptist Church brought response from the audience. As a teenager, he performed as a group member of Lost Souls in North Carolina and developed skills in both rap and hip-hop.

Omar Wilson has been performing in NYC and Connecticut clubs for over a decade. He’s opened for artists like Boys II Men and The Neville Brothers. Growing up in Norwalk, Connecticut, Omar's influences included Sam Cooke, Donny Hathaway, Stevie Wonder, Marvin Gaye, James Brown, Lauren Hill, Mary J Blige and old-time soul acts like the Delfonics. His music speaks to his own personal experiences growing up in an urban environment bridging the gap between Hip Hop and Soul.

Wilson is a three time Apollo winner since 2007 and maintained his victory upon becoming Best R&B Male of the Year for both 2008 and 2009 at the Underground Music Awards held at BB Kings in NYC. Wilson performed the National Anthem at Mohegan Sun Casino during the live broadcast of a TKO boxing event; he also performed his songs as the fight crowd started to gather.

Wilson released his first record nationally after going single into the RnB genre instead of performing the chorus for his Group his first track was "Get to Know You Better" featuring platinum recording artist Angie Stone. Wilson's first mixtape "Pieces of The Product" was a great street indie release. In the summer of 2011, he followed up and released a second mixtape entitled "The Product". The first single called "Never Again" was released May 10, 2012.

== "Faith!" track ==
Wilson has also worked with artist DMX, and they calibrated and created a track called "Faith!".

Entertainment journalist Chuck Taylor, a long-time editor for Billboard magazine, reviewed the track: "North Carolina–based singer/songwriter Omar Wilson’s new offering 'Faith' is positioned to propel the three-time Apollo winner to the mass appeal he has long deserved. With its classic soul instrumental palette and a gritty, passion-soaked vocal that would make Otis Redding mighty proud, the song offers a joyous universal message of hope, ... Add a fire-and-brimstone rap from platinum superstar DMX and “Faith” is primed to shine."

A blog commentary noted that "Omar Wilson cranks out an inspirational, uplifting tune, while DMX gives it some texture ..." and "This is one of the most lucid, and well-recorded X moments in the last few years."
