= Dreamgirl (song) =

Single by Dave Matthews Band

from the album Stand Up
- Released: August 8, 2005
- Recorded: Haunted Hollow Studio, Charlottesville, Virginia
- Genre: Rock
- Length: 4:01 (Album version); 3:32 (Radio mix)
- Label: RCA
- Songwriters: Dave Matthews, Mark Batson,
- Producer: Mark Batson

Dave Matthews Band singles chronology
"American Baby" (2005)	"Dreamgirl" (2005)	"Everybody Wake Up (Our Finest Hour Arrives)" (2005)

"Dreamgirl" is a song by the Dave Matthews Band that appears on their 2005 studio album, Stand Up. The song, which was written by Dave Matthews and producer Mark Batson, was the second radio single released in support of the album. The music video for the song features Julia Roberts, a longtime fan of the band.

== Track listing ==
American radio promo

1. "Dreamgirl" (radio mix) - 3:32
2. "Dreamgirl" (album version) - 4:01
3. Suggested callout hook - 0:10

== Charts ==
Chart (2005)	Peak position
US Adult Alternative Airplay (Billboard)	3
