= American Baby =

2005 single by Dave Matthews Band

Single by Dave Matthews Band

from the album Stand Up
- Released: March 28, 2005
- Recorded: Haunted Hollow (Charlottesville, Virginia)
- Length: 4:35 (album version); 3:42 (radio edit)
- Label: RCA
- Songwriters: Mark Batson; Carter Beauford; Stefan Lessard; Dave Matthews; LeRoi Moore; Boyd Tinsley
- Producer: Mark Batson

Dave Matthews Band singles chronology
"Grey Street" (2002)	"American Baby" (2005)	"Dreamgirl" (2005)

"American Baby" is a song by American rock band Dave Matthews Band, released as the first single from their sixth studio album, Stand Up. The song peaked at number 16 on the US Billboard Hot 100, making their highest-charting single in the United States. A music video was filmed for the song.

== Charts ==
=== Weekly charts ===
Weekly chart performance for "American Baby"
Chart (2005)	Peak position
Canada Hot AC Top 30 (Radio & Records)	18
US Billboard Hot 100	16
US Adult Alternative Airplay (Billboard)	2
US Adult Contemporary (Billboard)	39
US Adult Pop Airplay (Billboard)	8

=== Year-end charts ===
Year-end chart performance for "American Baby"
Chart (2005)	Position
US Adult Top 40 (Billboard)	29
US Triple-A (Billboard)	7

== Release history ==
Release dates and formats for "American Baby"
Region	Date	Format(s)	Label(s)	Ref.
United States	March 28, 2005	Hot adult contemporary; triple A; modern rock radio	RCA	
United States	June 7, 2005	Contemporary hit radio	RCA	
