= Dance for Me (Sisqó song) =

2001 single by Sisqó

"Dance For Me"

Single by Sisqó

from the album Return of Dragon
- Released: July 12, 2001
- Recorded: 2001
- Genre: R&B
- Length: 4:08
- Label: Def Soul
- Songwriters: Marquis Collins, Sisqó, Rich Shelton, Loren Hill, Kevin Veney and James Travis
- Producer: One Up Entertainment

Sisqó singles chronology
"Can I Live?" (2000)	"Dance For Me" (2001)	"Who's UR Daddy?" (2006)

Music video
- "Dance for Me" on YouTube

"Dance for Me" is a 2001 single recorded by Sisqó for Def Soul. The song charted at #6 in the UK Singles chart.

== Music video ==
Directed by Dave Meyers, the video took place in Universal Studios Florida with then-Eden's Crush's member Ivette Sosa playing the love interest.

== Track listing ==
CD single
No.	Title	Length
1.	"Dance For Me (Radio/Clean Edit)"	4:09
2.	"Dance For Me (WV Remix)"	6:39
3.	"Dance For Me (G Club Vocal Remix)"	6:58
4.	"Dance For Me (G Club Dub)"	6:24

LP single
No.	Title	Length
1.	"Dance For Me (Wookie's Camdino Soul Mix)"	4:49
2.	"Dance For Me (Wookie's Camdino Dub Mix)"	4:57
3.	"Dance For Me (Album Version)"	4:08

== Chart ==
=== Weekly charts ===
Chart (2001)	Peak position
Australia (ARIA)	40
Australian Urban (ARIA)	12
Belgium (Ultratip Bubbling Under Flanders)	2
Belgium (Ultratip Bubbling Under Wallonia)	9
Europe (European Hot 100 Singles)	15
France (SNEP)	91
Germany (GfK)	55
Ireland (IRMA)	32
Netherlands (Dutch Top 40)	6
Netherlands (Single Top 100)	10
Scotland Singles (OCC)	6
Sweden (Sverigetopplistan)	31
Switzerland (Schweizer Hitparade)	10
UK Singles (OCC)	6
UK Dance (OCC)	2
UK Hip Hop/R&B (OCC)	3
US Rhythmic Airplay (Billboard)	39

=== Year-end charts ===
Chart (2001)	Position
Netherlands (Dutch Top 40)	88
Netherlands (Single Top 100)	89
Switzerland (Schweizer Hitparade)	73
UK Singles (Official Charts Company)	123
UK Urban (Music Week)	15
