= Can I Live? =

Single by Sisqó

from the album Return of Dragon
- Released: May 8, 2001 (US)
- Recorded: 2001
- Genre: New jack swing
- Length: 3:37
- Label: Def Soul; The Island Def Jam Music Group
- Songwriters: Teddy Riley; Richard Stanard; D'Wayne Jones
- Producers: Teddy Riley; Jones

Sisqó singles chronology
| "How Many Licks?" (2000) | "Can I Live?" (2001) | "Dance For Me" (2001) |

Music video
- "Can I Live?" on YouTube

"Can I Live?" is a song by American R&B singer Sisqó, released in May 2001 as the lead single from his second studio album Return of Dragon (2001). It was written and produced by Sisqó and Teddy Riley. "The Dragon Family" and R&B group LovHer appear on the track as guest vocalists. "Can I Live?" only managed to peak at number 72 on the Billboard Hot R&B/Hip-Hop Songs chart, but was a minor chart success in Germany.

== Music video ==
Directed by Dave Meyers, the video takes place in a nightclub where Sisqó attracts women with his dancing.

== Live performances ==
Sisqó performed the song live at the inaugural BET Awards in Las Vegas on June 19, 2001.

== Track listing ==
Germany maxi CD
| No. | Title | Length |
|---|---|---|
| 1. | "Can I Live" (Stargate radio edit) | 4:07 |
| 2. | "Can I Live" (radio edit) | 4:02 |
| 3. | "Can I Live" (explicit album version) | 4:04 |
| 4. | "Can I Live" (video) | 4:08 |

12" promo CD
| No. | Title | Length |
|---|---|---|
| 1. | "Can I Live" (radio edit w/o rap) | 4:01 |
| 2. | "Can I Live" (radio edit w/rap) | 4:02 |
| 3. | "Can I Live" (LP version) | 4:02 |
| 4. | "Can I Live" (instrumental) | 4:00 |
| 5. | "Last Night" (radio edit) | 3:42 |
| 6. | "Last Night" (LP version) | 3:42 |
| 7. | "Last Night" (instrumental) | 3:42 |

== Charts ==
Chart performance for "Can I Live?"
| Chart (2001) | Peak position |
|---|---|
| Australia (ARIA) | 100 |
| Germany (GfK) | 87 |
| US Hot R&B/Hip-Hop Songs (Billboard) | 72 |
