= The Gorge (album) =

Live album by Dave Matthews Band
- Released: June 29, 2004
- Recorded: September 6–8, 2002, The Gorge Amphitheatre, George, Washington
- Genre: Rock
- Length: 112:30 (audio)
- Label: RCA
- Producer: John Alagía

Dave Matthews Band chronology
The Central Park Concert (2003)	The Gorge (2004)	Stand Up (2005)

Professional ratings
Review scores
Source	Rating
Allmusic	4/5 stars
Rolling Stone	4/5 stars

The Gorge is a collection of the songs played during Dave Matthews Band's three-night concert in 2002 at The Gorge Amphitheatre in George, Washington. The album was released in a three-disc set featuring 2 CDs and a DVD with live footage, advanced multi-angle features, behind the scenes clips, and a music video. The DVD was directed by Fenton Williams of Filament Productions. The DVD was authored by Neil Matthews at Ascent Media in New York City. The entire three-night concert was also released online through the band's online store as an MP3 or FLAC download, or as a six-CD box set.

== Track listing ==
Disc one

1. "Pantala Naga Pampa" (David J. Matthews) » "Rapunzel" (Carter Beauford, Stefan Lessard, Matthews) – 7:50
2. "The Song That Jane Likes" (Matthews, Mark Roebuck) - 4:33
3. "Fool to Think" (Matthews, Glen Ballard) – 4:19
4. "You Never Know" (Beauford, Lessard, Matthews, LeRoi Moore, Boyd Tinsley) – 7:13
5. "Granny" (Matthews) – 4:08
6. "Gravedigger" (Matthews) – 5:18
7. "Everyday" (Matthews, Ballard) » "#36" (Matthews) – 8:47
8. "Two Step" (Matthews) – 19:01

Disc two

1. "Drive In, Drive Out" (Matthews) – 6:14
2. "The Space Between" (Matthews, Ballard) – 4:55
3. "Kit Kat Jam" (Beauford, Lessard, Matthews, Moore, Tinsley) – 5:27
4. "Lie In Our Graves" (Beauford, Lessard, Matthews, Moore, Tinsley) – 16:59
5. "Proudest Monkey" (Beauford, Lessard, Matthews, Moore, Tinsley) – 8:49
6. "Warehouse" (Matthews) – 8:56

Disc (DVD)

1. "Grey Street" (Beauford, Lessard, Matthews, Moore, Tinsley)
2. "Ants Marching" (Matthews)
3. Inside the Gorge (documentary)
4. "Pig" (Beauford, Lessard, Matthews, Moore, Tinsley)
5. "Dancing Nancies" (Matthews)
6. "What Would You Say" (Beauford, Lessard, Matthews, Moore, Tinsley)
7. "Loving Wings" (Matthews) » "Where Are You Going" (Beauford, Lessard, Matthews, Moore, Tinsley)
8. Inside the Gorge (featuring "Gravedigger")
9. "Seek Up" (Matthews)
10. "Halloween" (Matthews)
11. "Tripping Billies" (Matthews)
12. Inside the Gorge (Making the "Grace Is Gone" video)
13. "Grace Is Gone" (Music video)

== Special edition ==
The six-disc special edition features each song from all three nights. This release was only available from Musictoday.com's online store and was not sold in stores.

Disc one – September 6, 2002

1. "Don't Drink the Water" – 10:43
2. "When the World Ends" – 4:08
3. "You Never Know" – 7:20
4. "Grace Is Gone" – 6:57
5. "#41" – 14:07
6. "Satellite" – 5:29
7. "Bartender" – 13:42
8. "So Much to Say" » – 4:16
9. "Anyone Seen the Bridge?" » – 1:23
10. "Too Much" – 4:35

Disc two – September 6, 2002

11. "Fool to Think" – 4:56
12. "One Sweet World" – 9:18
13. "Loving Wings" – 7:04
14. "Where Are You Going" – 3:57
15. "Everyday" » "#36" – 8:59
16. "Grey Street" – 6:31
17. "Gravedigger" – 5:49
18. "Ants Marching" – 7:43

Disc three – September 7, 2002

19. "Grace Is Gone" – 7:50
20. "The Stone" – 8:35
21. "Pig" – 8:29
22. "Rhyme and Reason" – 6:03
23. "Captain" – 5:48
24. "I Did It" – 3:41
25. "Dancing Nancies" – 9:48
26. "Warehouse" – 8:51
27. "What Would You Say" – 5:28
28. "Crush" – 11:55

Disc four – September 7, 2002

29. "Kit Kat Jam" – 5:55
30. "Jimi Thing" – 15:24
31. "Drive In, Drive Out" – 6:19
32. "Loving Wings" – 7:12
33. "Where Are You Going" – 4:23
34. "Two Step" – 20:03
35. "Cry Freedom" – 4:39
36. "What You Are" – 8:33

Disc five – September 8, 2002

37. "Pantala Naga Pampa" » "Rapunzel" – 8:46
38. "Grey Street" – 5:53
39. "Granny" – 4:36
40. "If I Had It All" – 4:24
41. "Crash into Me" – 5:55
42. "The Song That Jane Likes" – 4:33
43. "The Space Between" – 4:53
44. "Seek Up" – 20:59
45. "Proudest Monkey" – 9:16
46. "Too Much" – 5:13
47. "Digging a Ditch" – 5:19

Disc six – September 8, 2002

48. "Lie in Our Graves" – 18:37
49. "Lover Lay Down" – 8:27
50. "Grace Is Gone" – 7:12
51. "The Dreaming Tree" – 4:28
52. "All Along the Watchtower" – 12:09
53. "Long Black Veil" – 5:55
54. "Halloween" – 9:06
55. "Tripping Billies" – 6:20

== Personnel ==
Dave Matthews Band

- Carter Beauford – percussion, drums, backup vocals
- Stefan Lessard – bass guitar
- Dave Matthews – acoustic guitar (electric guitar on "What You Are"), vocals
- LeRoi Moore – saxophones, backup vocals
- Boyd Tinsley – electric violin, backup vocals

Additional musicians

- Butch Taylor – keyboards

Technical personnel

- Gary Adcock - screen graphics: tour
- Dave Bell - production assistant
- Michael Caron - stadium video: tour
- Mo Hale - stage manager: tour
- Jim Hathaway - tour security
- Patrick Jordan - project manager
- Felix Kawamura - opening title designer
- Thane Kerner - package art director
- Thane Kerner - package designer
- Mike Lane - engineer
- Dean Lawrence - tour manager
- Malan McCubbin - engineer in charge (as Malin MacCubin)
- Andrew McHaddad - communications
- Ken McMillan - production assistant
- Anthony Miller - head utility
- Chris Mitchell - engineer in charge
- Terry O'Gara - production assistant
- Jonathan O'Keefe - merchandiser: tour
- Erik Porter - violin/bass technician: tour
- David Richard - production assistant
- David Saull - horn technician: tour
- Jod Soraci - high definition color correction: Riot Colors
- Greg Tannebring - assistant communications
- Geoffrey Trump - tour accountant
- Adam Warner - production assistant
- Angie Warner - backstage coordinator: tour
- Fenton Williams - video director: tour
