= List of awards and nominations received by Dave Matthews Band =

Dave Matthews Band awards and nominations
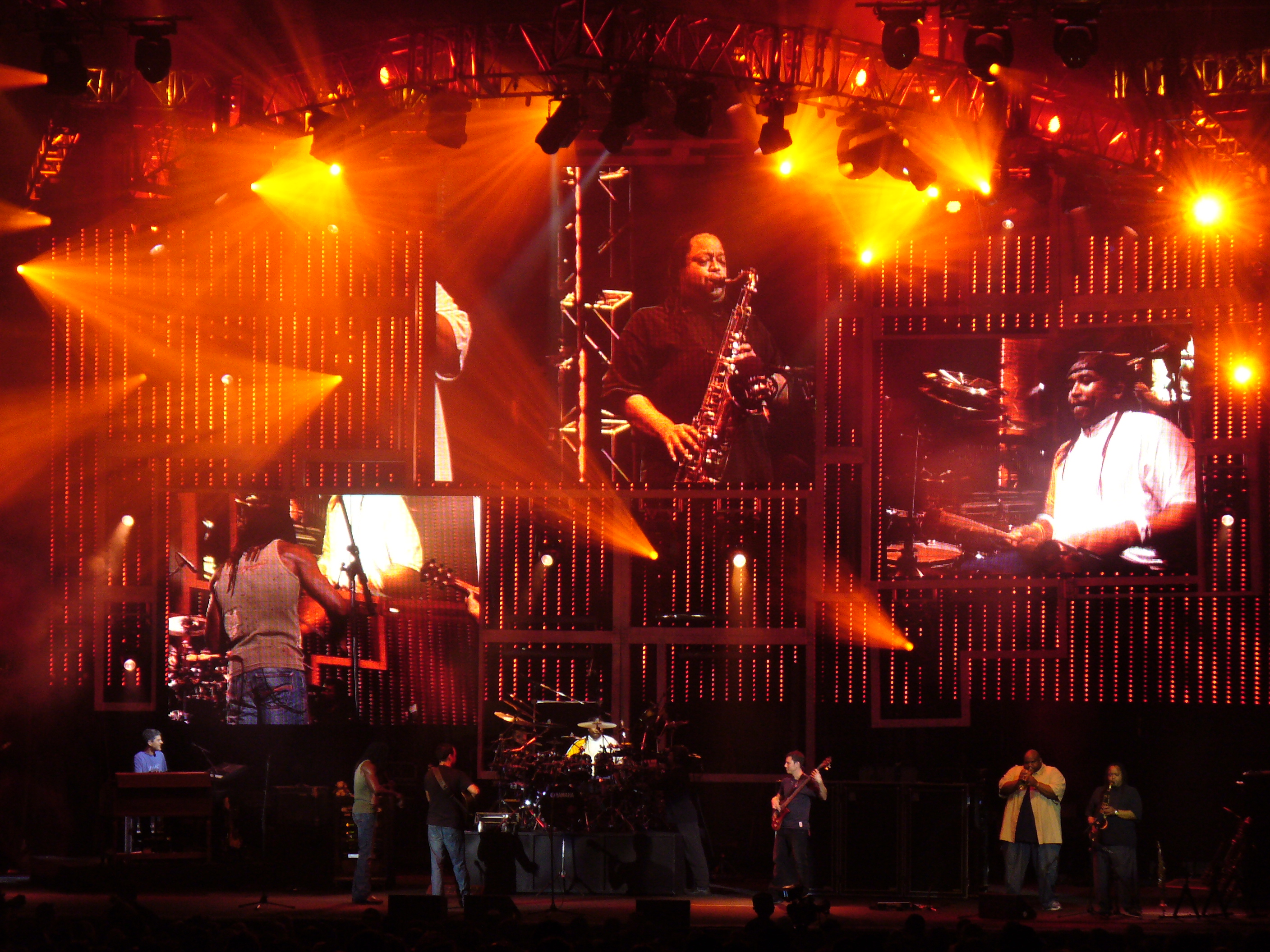
- Dave Matthews Band during the 2006 Summer Tour at the Toyota Pavilion at Montage Mountain in Scranton, Pennsylvania
Awards and nominations
Award	Wins	Nominations
American Music Awards	0	3
Grammy	1	14
MTV VMA	0	6
My VH1 Music Awards	4	4
NAACP Image Awards	1	1

Totals (Note: Certain award groups do not simply award one winner. They acknowledge several different recipients, have runners-up, and have third place. Since this is a specific recognition and is different from losing an award, runner-up mentions are considered wins in this award tally. For simplification and to avoid errors, each award in this list has been presumed to have had a prior nomination.)
- Wins: 7
- Nominations: 29

Dave Matthews Band is an American rock band formed in Charlottesville, Virginia in 1991 by singer-songwriter and guitarist Dave Matthews. The band has sold over 31 million albums in the United States, making it one of the top 100 highest-selling music acts of all time. Dave Matthews Band won the 1996 Grammy Award for Best Rock Vocal Performance by a Duo or Group for "So Much to Say" and has been nominated for 13 additional Grammys. The band has received three American Music Awards nominations and six MTV Video Music Awards nominations, but has yet to win an award at either ceremony. Overall, Dave Matthews Band has received six awards from 28 nominations.

In 2019 and 2023, the Dave Matthews Band was nominated for induction into the Rock and Roll Hall of Fame and inducted in 2024.

== American Music Awards ==
The American Music Awards is an annual awards ceremony created by Dick Clark in 1973. Dave Matthews Band has received three nominations.

Year	Nominee / work	Award	Result
1997	Dave Matthews Band	Favorite Pop/Rock Band/Duo/Group	Nominated
2002	Dave Matthews Band	Favorite Pop/Rock Band/Duo/Group	Nominated
2002	Everyday	Favorite Pop/Rock Album	Nominated

== Grammy Awards ==
The Grammy Awards are awarded annually by the National Academy of Recording Arts and Sciences of the United States. Dave Matthews Band has received one award from fourteen nominations.

Year	Nominee / work	Award	Result
1996	"What Would You Say"	Best Rock Vocal Performance by a Duo or Group	Nominated
1996	"What Would You Say"	Best Music Video, Short Form	Nominated
1997	"So Much to Say"	Best Rock Vocal Performance by a Duo or Group	Won
1997	"Too Much"	Best Rock Song	Nominated
1997	Crash	Best Rock Album	Nominated
1998	"Crash Into Me"	Best Rock Vocal Performance by a Duo or Group	Nominated
1998	"Crash Into Me"	Best Rock Song	Nominated
1999	"Crush"	Best Pop Performance by a Duo or Group with Vocal	Nominated
1999	Before These Crowded Streets	Best Rock Album	Nominated
2000	"Love of My Life" with Santana	Best Pop Collaboration with Vocals	Nominated
2002	"The Space Between"	Best Rock Vocal Performance by a Duo or Group	Nominated
2003	"Where Are You Going"	Best Pop Performance by a Duo or Group with Vocal	Nominated
2010	Big Whiskey and the GrooGrux King	Best Rock Album	Nominated
2010	Big Whiskey and the GrooGrux King	Album of the Year	Nominated

== MTV Video Music Awards ==
The MTV Video Music Awards is an annual awards ceremony established in 1984 by MTV. Dave Matthews Band has received six nominations.

Year	Nominee / work	Award	Result
1997	"Crash Into Me"	Best Group Video	Nominated
1997	"Crash Into Me"	Best Rock Video	Nominated
1998	"Don't Drink the Water"	Best Rock Video	Nominated
1998	"Don't Drink the Water"	Best Cinematography	Nominated
2001	"I Did It"	Best Group Video	Nominated
2002	"Everyday"	Best Group Video	Nominated

== VH1 Music Awards ==
The VH1 Music Awards was a short-lived annual awards ceremony established by the VH1 music channel. Dave Matthews Band has received four awards from four nominations.

Year	Nominee / work	Award	Result
2000	Dave Matthews Band	Favorite Group	Won
2001	"The Space Between"	Damn I Wish I Wrote That	Won
2001	Everyday	Must-Have Album	Won
2001	Dave Matthews Band	Favorite Group	Won

== NAACP Image Awards ==
The NAACP Image Awards are presented annually by the American National Association for the Advancement of Colored People. Dave Matthews Band has received one award.

Year	Nominee / work	Award	Result
2004	Dave Matthews Band	Chairman's Award	Won

== Rock and Roll Hall of Fame ==
The Rock and Roll Hall of Fame is a museum located on the shores of Lake Erie in downtown Cleveland, Ohio, United States, dedicated to the recording history of some of the best-known and most influential artists, producers, and other people who have influenced the music industry.

Year	Nominee / work	Award	Result
2019	Performer	Nominated	
2024	Performer	Won	
