= Live at Radio City =

Live album by Dave Matthews and Tim Reynolds
- Released: August 14, 2007
- Recorded: Radio City Music Hall, New York City, New York on April 22, 2007
- Genre: Rock
- Length: 147:00
- Label: RCA

Dave Matthews and Tim Reynolds chronology
Live at Luther College (1999)	Live at Radio City (2007)	Live in Las Vegas (2010)

Dave Matthews chronology
Imagine We Were (2005)	Live at Radio City (2007)	Benaroya Hall 10.24.02 (2008)

Professional ratings
Review scores
Source	Rating
Allmusic	3.5/5 stars
Rolling Stone	3/5 stars

Live at Radio City is a live album and video by Dave Matthews and Tim Reynolds recorded at Radio City Music Hall on April 22, 2007. This was the first release by Matthews and Reynolds since Live at Luther College, released in 1999.

== Release ==
The concert was released as both a two-disc album on CD and a two-disc video on DVD. A Blu-ray Disc version of the video was scheduled to be released two weeks after the CD and DVD release date, on August 28, 2007, but was postponed until September 4, 2007. The DVD release features various bonus features, such as a behind-the-scenes documentary, a 5.1 audio mix, and a photo gallery. The DVD was directed by Sam Erickson of 44 Pictures and Fenton Williams of Filament Productions.

The album debuted at number three on the U.S. Billboard 200, selling about 70,000 copies in its first week; it also debuted at number one on the Top Rock Albums, Top Alternative Albums and Top Internet Albums charts.

== Songs ==
The tracks were recorded at a live acoustic rock concert at Radio City Music Hall in New York City on April 22, 2007. The 26-song set features 12 songs from Dave Matthews Band albums and six songs from Dave Matthews' Some Devil album. The other songs in the set include various unreleased and cover songs. Matthews and Reynolds played the entire set together, with the exception of two solos by Reynolds—"Betrayal" and "You Are My Sanity"—and one solo performance by Matthews—"Some Devil." This is the first time Matthews has played piano at a show, and he also plays a small piece of The Beatles' "Blackbird" before "Out of My Hands".

== Track listing ==
All songs by David J. Matthews unless otherwise noted.

=== Disc one ===
1. "Bartender" – 8:30
2. "When the World Ends" (Matthews, Ballard) – 4:13
3. "Stay or Leave" – 4:09
4. "Save Me" – 4:41
5. "Crush" – 7:54
6. "So Damn Lucky" (Matthews, Harris) – 6:51
7. "Gravedigger" – 4:19
8. "The Maker" (Lanois) – 5:17
9. "Old Dirt Hill (Bring That Beat Back)" (Matthews, Batson) – 5:49
10. "Eh Hee" – 5:00
11. "Betrayal" (Reynolds) – 5:31
12. "Out of My Hands" (Matthews, Batson) – 5:23
13. "Still Water" (Lanois) – 2:21
14. "Don't Drink the Water" – 6:09

=== Disc two ===
1. "Oh" – 5:09
2. "Corn Bread" (Matthews, Batson) – 4:36
3. "Crash into Me" – 6:05
4. "Down by the River" (Young) – 5:45
5. "You Are My Sanity" (Reynolds) – 5:58
6. "Sister" – 3:44
7. "Lie in Our Graves" – 8:53
8. "Some Devil" – 5:11
9. "Grace Is Gone" – 4:12
10. "Dancing Nancies" – 9:03
11. "#41" – 5:48
12. "Two Step" – 6:29
