= Live at Red Rocks 8.15.95 =

Live album by Dave Matthews Band
- Released: October 28, 1997
- Recorded: August 15, 1995
- Venues: Red Rocks Amphitheatre, Morrison, Colorado
- Studio: Alpha Beat Audio
- Genre: Rock
- Length: 125:15
- Label: RCA
- Producer: John Alagía

Dave Matthews Band chronology
Crash (1996)	Live at Red Rocks 8.15.95 (1997)	Before These Crowded Streets (1998)

Professional ratings
Review scores
Source	Rating
Allmusic	4/5 stars

Live at Red Rocks 8.15.95 is an album by the Dave Matthews Band, released on October 28, 1997. It was recorded live at Red Rocks Amphitheatre in Morrison, Colorado on August 15, 1995. The band's performance was during the third consecutive year at which they had played at the venue (although in 1993 only as a warm up for The Tragically Hip / The Samples.). Guitarist Tim Reynolds guested with the band during the entire show. Most of the songs featured were from the band's most recent album Under the Table and Dreaming. "Ants Marching," "Satellite," "Seek Up," "Recently," and "Tripping Billies" originally appeared on the band's first album, Remember Two Things, while "Proudest Monkey," "Two Step," "Lie in Our Graves," and "Drive In Drive Out" would not appear as studio recordings until the release of Crash in 1996. "#36" was later reworked into the song "Everyday," which was included on the album of the same name in 2001. Also included is the band's cover of "All Along the Watchtower."

Live at Red Rocks was the first of many live releases by the Dave Matthews Band. Before this release, live concerts were only available as bootleg recordings, which lacked audio mixing and remastering. Despite being a live release, the album was very successful during its release, hitting #3 on the album charts, and selling over two million copies. This release has so far been the band's most successful live release. Due to its popularity, the band went on to release numerous other live albums, including another from Red Rocks, Weekend on the Rocks featuring highlights from a four-night stand at Red Rocks in 2005.

== Track listing ==
All songs written by Dave Matthews except where noted.

Disc one

1. "Seek Up" – 13:29
2. "Proudest Monkey" * (Matthews, Carter Beauford, Stefan Lessard, LeRoi Moore, Boyd Tinsley) – 7:04
3. "Satellite" – 5:07
4. "Two Step" – 9:21
5. "The Best of What's Around" – 6:18
6. "Recently" * – 6:12
7. "Lie in Our Graves" ** – 8:19
8. "Dancing Nancies" – 9:12
9. "Warehouse" – 8:04

Disc two

1. "Tripping Billies" – 4:49
2. "Drive In Drive Out" – 6:20
3. "Lover Lay Down" – 6:23
4. "Rhyme and Reason" – 7:03
5. "#36" *** – 12:55
6. "Ants Marching" – 6:52
7. "Typical Situation" – 7:01
8. "All Along the Watchtower" (Bob Dylan) – 7:03

* Includes instrumental/vocal excerpts from "Sunshine on My Shoulders" (John Denver, Richard Kniss, Mike Taylor), likely a reference to the concert special recorded by John Denver at Red Rocks in 1973.

** Includes an instrumental excerpt from "Over the Rainbow" (Harold Arlen, Yip Harburg)

*** Includes an instrumental excerpt from "Linus and Lucy" (Vince Guaraldi)

== Personnel ==
Dave Matthews Band

- Carter Beauford – percussion and drums
- Stefan Lessard – bass guitar
- Dave Matthews – acoustic guitar and vocals
- LeRoi Moore – woodwinds
- Boyd Tinsley – violin

Additional musicians

- Tim Reynolds – electric guitar
