= Live at Folsom Field, Boulder, Colorado =

Live album by Dave Matthews Band
- Released: November 5, 2002
- Recorded: July 11, 2001
- Genre: Rock
- Length: 150:53
- Label: RCA
- Producer: John Alagía

Dave Matthews Band chronology
Busted Stuff (2002)	Live at Folsom Field, Boulder, Colorado (2002)	The Central Park Concert (2003)

Professional ratings
Review scores
Source	Rating
Allmusic	3/5 stars
Rolling Stone	3/5 stars

Live at Folsom Field, Boulder, Colorado is the fourth live album released by the Dave Matthews Band. It was recorded in Boulder, Colorado at Folsom Field, the football stadium of the University of Colorado Boulder on July 11, 2001. It was released on the RCA Records music label on November 5, 2002 on Compact Disc, VHS, and DVD. The DVD was directed by Fenton Williams of Filament Productions. In promotional material prior to the release, the album was originally titled Open up the Curtains, a reference to the song "I Did It."

The concert went 15 minutes past the allotted 10:30 p.m. curfew time for the venue, and Dave Matthews Band were fined $1,000 for every minute they performed past the curfew, for a total of $15,000. Concerts were suspended at Folsom Field indefinitely following the show, and no concerts were performed at the stadium until two Dead & Company shows in 2016.

== Track listing ==
Disc one

1. "Don't Drink the Water" – 9:10
2. "JTR" – 6:52
  - with The Lovely Ladies
3. "When the World Ends" – 3:46
4. "So Right" – 6:15
5. "Big Eyed Fish" – 7:08
6. "Bartender" – 9:54
7. "What You Are" – 6:56
8. "Crash into Me" – 5:57
9. "Everyday" – 8:42
  - with The Lovely Ladies
10. "I Did It" – 3:44
  - with The Lovely Ladies
11. "If I Had It All" – 4:31
  - with The Lovely Ladies

Disc two

12. "Angel" – 14:29
  - with The Lovely Ladies
13. "Warehouse" – 9:25
14. "Recently" – 4:12
15. "Digging A Ditch" – 5:33
16. "What Would You Say" – 4:53
17. "All Along the Watchtower" (Dylan) – 9:24
  - with Butch Taylor
18. "The Space Between" – 5:00
  - with The Lovely Ladies
19. "Stay (Wasting Time)" – 7:47
20. "Two Step" – 9:18
21. "Ants Marching" – 7:55

== Personnel ==
Dave Matthews Band

- Carter Beauford – percussion, drums
- Stefan Lessard – bass guitar
- Dave Matthews – acoustic and electric guitar, vocals
- LeRoi Moore – saxophone
- Boyd Tinsley – electric violin

Guests

- The Lovely Ladies – vocals
  - Tawatha Agee
  - Cindy Myzell
  - Brenda White King
- Butch Taylor – keyboards

Technical personnel

- Doug Biro .... executive producer: RCA Records
- Danny O'Bryen .... producer
- Hugh Surratt .... executive producer: RCA Records
- Fenton Williams .... producer
- Stephan Gomes .... set carpenter: DMB tour crew
- John Alagia .... stereo mixer
- Jeff Child .... audio technician: DMB tour crew
- Derek Featherstone .... audio technician: DMB tour crew
- Scott Harvey .... delay audio: tour
- Jeff Juliano .... stereo mixer
- Gary Long .... sound
- Lonnie Quinn .... audio crew chief: DMB tour crew
- Larry Reed .... sound
- Derek Sample .... sound re-recording mixer: Post Fix Inc.
- Stewart Whitmore .... digital sound editor: Marcussen Mastering, Hollywood, CA (as Stewart Whitemore)
- Jeff Richter .... supervising editor
- Ed Cherney .... music mixer: Capitol Studios, Los Angeles, CA
- Steve Genewick .... assistant music mixer: Capitol Studios, Los Angeles, CA
- Stephen Marcussen .... music mastering
- Doug Biro .... creative director: RCA Records
- Hugh Surratt .... creative director: RCA Records
- Chris Osterhus – film editing
- Jeff Richter – film editing
- Greg Rogers – film editing

== Year-end charts ==
Chart (2002)	Position
Canadian Alternative Albums (Nielsen SoundScan)	155
