= Live in Las Vegas (Dave Matthews and Tim Reynolds album) =

Live In Las Vegas

Live album by Dave Matthews and Tim Reynolds
- Released: February 9, 2010
- Recorded: Planet Hollywood Resort and Casino, Las Vegas, Nevada on December 12, 2009
- Genre: Rock
- Length: 2:23:01
- Label: RCA

Dave Matthews and Tim Reynolds chronology
Live at Radio City (2007)	Live In Las Vegas (2010)

Singles from Live in Las Vegas
- 1. "Squirm / Lying in the Hands of God" Released: April 17, 2010

Live In Las Vegas is a live album by Dave Matthews and Tim Reynolds. The recorded show was performed on December 12, 2009, at the Planet Hollywood Resort and Casino in Las Vegas, Nevada. This album is the acoustic duo's third official release.

== Songs and performance ==
The songs on Live in Las Vegas were recorded live concert at Planet Hollywood Resort and Casino in Las Vegas on December 11 and 12, 2009. This album marks the first official release of acoustic versions of songs from Big Whiskey and the GrooGrux King.

Thirteen songs were Dave Matthews Band songs, five from the Dave Matthews solo album Some Devil, one song was a Tim Reynolds original, and the remaining songs were various unrecorded or borrowed songs. Similar to Live at Radio City, Matthews and Reynolds performed together, with the exception of two songs played solo by Reynolds ("Kundalini Bonfire" and "Kashmir" by Led Zeppelin) and Matthews playing "Some Devil" solo.

== Track listing ==
=== Disc one ===
1. "Eh Hee" - 6:08
2. "Dancing Nancies" - 8:11
3. "Squirm" - 5:24
4. "Grace Is Gone" - 4:34
5. "Alligator Pie" - 4:41
6. "One Sweet World" - 5:37
7. "Loving Wings" - 4:19
8. "Grey Street" - 4:31
9. "Kundalini Bonfire" - 4:43
10. "Oh" - 2:59
11. "Christmas Song" - 4:57
12. "Funny the Way It Is" - 5:56
13. "Stay or Leave" - 4:08
14. "Shake Me Like a Monkey" - 4:24
15. "Lying in the Hands of God" - 5:37

=== Disc two ===
1. "Bartender" - 8:44
2. "Kashmir" - 7:13
3. "So Damn Lucky" - 6:42
4. "Little Red Bird" - 3:02
5. "Save Me" - 4:19
6. "You and Me" - 4:32
7. "Crush" - 7:45
8. "Some Devil" - 4:28
9. "Typical Situation" - 7:55
10. "Sister" - 4:14
11. "Two Step" - 7:58

== Double Down bonus disc ==
Members of the DMB Warehouse who pre-ordered the "Live in Las Vegas" CD also received an eight-track bonus CD called "Double Down" containing songs from the first two shows at Planet Hollywood on December 10 and 11, 2009.

=== Track listing ===
1. "The Stone" - 8:56 - 12/11/2009
2. "Cornbread" - 5:00 - 12/11/2009
3. "Gravedigger" - 4:07 - 12/10/2009
4. "Rye Whiskey" - 3:25 - 12/11/2009

1. "#27" - 5:06 - 12/11/2009
2. "Spaceman" - 5:21 - 12/10/2009
3. "The Wayfarer" - 5:08 - 12/10/2009
4. "Time Bomb" - 5:14 - 12/10/2009

== Vinyl release ==
A 7" vinyl release of the song Squirm, with Lying in the Hands of God as the B-side was released on April 17, 2010, for Record Store Day.

== Video releases ==
On June 25, 2010, "Funny The Way It Is" (performed on the Live in Las Vegas live album) was released as a high definition video for the official Dave Matthews Band iPhone app. On September 1, 2010, a video of "Grey Street" was released on the official app. For the 2010 holiday season, the Live in Las Vegas video of "Christmas Song" was released through the Dave Matthews Band website.

== Grammy nomination ==
The piece "Kundalini Bonfire" was nominated for a Grammy Award in the category of Best Rock Instrumental Performance but ultimately lost to the Jeff Beck's "Hammerhead".
