= The Central Park Concert =

Live album by Dave Matthews Band
- Released: November 18, 2003
- Recorded: September 24, 2003, at Central Park, New York City, New York
- Genre: Rock, jazz rock
- Length: 164:29
- Label: RCA
- Producer: John Alagía (CD); Doug Brio, Daniel Catullo, Jack Gulick(DVD)

Dave Matthews Band chronology
Live at Folsom Field, Boulder, Colorado (2002)	The Central Park Concert (2003)	The Gorge (2004)

The Central Park Concert is a 2003 live album by the American rock group, Dave Matthews Band, recorded in Central Park, New York City. The concert attracted more than 120,000 people, which makes it the biggest audience to attend a Dave Matthews Band concert.

Professional ratings
Review scores
Source	Rating
Allmovie	3/5 stars
Allmusic	4/5 stars
Rolling Stone	3/5 stars

== Track listing ==
Disc one

1. "Don't Drink the Water" (Matthews) – 10:09
2. "So Much to Say" (Griesar, Matthews, Tinsley) – 4:14
3. "Anyone Seen the Bridge?" » "Too Much" (Beauford, Lessard, Matthews, Moore, Tinsley) – 6:41
4. "Granny" (Matthews) – 4:32
5. "Crush" (Matthews) – 11:19
6. "When the World Ends" (Ballard, Matthews) – 3:54

Disc two

7. "Dancing Nancies" (Matthews) – 9:44
8. "Warehouse" (Matthews) – 9:40
9. "Ants Marching" (Matthews) – 5:51
10. "Rhyme & Reason" (Matthews) – 5:36
11. "Two Step" (Matthews) – 18:56
12. "Help Myself" (Matthews) – 5:22

Disc three

13. "Cortez the Killer" (Young) – 10:52
  - featuring Warren Haynes on guitar and vocals
14. "Jimi Thing" (Matthews) – 16:39
  - featuring Warren Haynes on guitar
  - includes an interpolation of "For What It's Worth"
15. "What Would You Say" (Matthews) – 5:27
16. "Where Are You Going" (Matthews) – 3:53
17. "All Along the Watchtower" (Dylan) – 12:59
  - features a bass guitar intro jam of "The Star-Spangled Banner" by Stefan Lessard
18. "Grey Street" (Matthews) – 4:58
19. "What You Are" (Ballard, Matthews) – 6:40
20. "Stay (Wasting Time)" (Lessard, Matthews, Moore) – 6:59

=== DVD track listing ===
Disc one

1. Prelude »
2. "Don't Drink the Water"
3. "So Much to Say" » "Anyone Seen the Bridge?"
4. "Too Much"
5. "Granny"
6. "Crush"
7. "When the World Ends"
8. "Dancing Nancies" »
9. "Warehouse"
10. "Ants Marching"
11. "Rhyme & Reason"
12. "Two Step"

Disc two

13. "Help Myself"
14. "Cortez, the Killer"
15. "Jimi Thing"
16. "What Would You Say"
17. "Where Are You Going"
18. "All Along the Watchtower"
19. "Grey Street"
20. "What You Are"
21. "Stay (Wasting Time)"

== Personnel ==
Dave Matthews Band

- Carter Beauford — percussion, drums, backup vocals
- Stefan Lessard — bass guitar
- Dave Matthews — guitars, vocals
- LeRoi Moore — saxophones, backup vocals
- Boyd Tinsley — violin, backup vocals

Additional musicians

- Butch Taylor — keyboards, backup vocals
- Warren Haynes — guitar, vocals

== Charts ==
=== Weekly charts ===
Chart (2003–2005)	Peak position
Australian Music DVDs (ARIA)	17
Canadian Alternative Albums (Nielsen Soundscan)	24
US Billboard 200	14

=== Year-end charts ===
Chart (2004)	Position
US Billboard 200	187

== Certifications ==
Region	Certification	Certified units/sales
Australia (ARIA)	Gold	7,500^{^}
United States (RIAA)	Platinum	1,000,000^{^}
^{^} Shipments figures based on certification alone.
