= The Lillywhite Sessions =

- One of many fan-made covers for the album

Studio album (bootleg) by Dave Matthews Band
- Released: March 2001 (unofficially leaked)
- Recorded: Winter 1999 – Summer 2000
- Genre: Alternative rock
- Length: 69:39
- Producer: Steve Lillywhite

Dave Matthews Band chronology
Everyday (2001)	The Lillywhite Sessions (2001)	Live in Chicago 12.19.98 (2001)

The Lillywhite Sessions (tLWS) is a collection of songs recorded by Dave Matthews Band in 1999 and 2000 and produced by Steve Lillywhite. The songs, recorded by the band as a follow-up to their 1998 album Before These Crowded Streets, were ultimately scrapped by the band's label. Upon being forced by the label to abandon the album-in-progress, Dave Matthews was assigned to work with producer Glen Ballard who, in association with Matthews, wrote the album Everyday in just ten days. This contrasted with the band's prior style of writing, which included significant collaboration between the band members in the studio. The recordings later emerged on the Internet shortly after the release of Everyday, and created controversy among fans as well as the music industry, which was early in its campaign to curb illegal file downloads. The Lillywhite Sessions were never officially released, but most of the songs were later recorded for their 2002 album Busted Stuff.

== Track listing ==
1. "Busted Stuff" – 4:05
2. "Grey Street" – 5:53
3. "Diggin' a Ditch" – 4:24
4. "Sweet Up and Down" – 4:43
5. "JTR" – 5:36
6. "Big Eyed Fish" – 5:16
7. "Grace Is Gone" – 5:12
8. "Captain (Crazy)" – 5:27
9. "Bartender" –10:07
10. "Monkey Man" – 7:21
11. "Kit Kat Jam" – 4:00
12. "Raven" – 6:24

Also recorded but cut from the album is the track "Build You a House".

== Recording sessions ==
The album was supposed to be produced in the manner of the band's prior three (Under the Table and Dreaming, Crash, and Before These Crowded Streets), all of which had been produced by Steve Lillywhite. Having recorded Dave Matthews Band in studios in New York City, Woodstock, New York and Sausalito, California, Lillywhite had an established relationship with its members. For this album, the band purchased a house near their hometown of Charlottesville, Virginia and converted a portion of it into a recording studio. The band tried some new things, including Matthews playing a twelve string guitar. In early 2000, Lillywhite posted a report on the band's website with details about the session-in-progress, saying that the band had recorded a number of new songs, including "Sweet Up and Down," and had reworked a song which the Dave Matthews Band performed with Santana in 1999, "John the Revelator," retitling it "JTR."

During the recording of the sessions, RCA Records executive Bruce Flohr asked drummer Carter Beauford about his feelings about the songs at that point, to which he replied that he "didn't feel it" and was almost certain that the other band members "didn't feel it" either, implying that the recordings were not going in the direction in which the band had intended. The songs that had been recorded at that point were very dark, which Dave Matthews claimed was partly inspired by his alcohol consumption during the sessions, inspiring him to write "sad bastard songs" that were full of pity.

"[The songs] inspired pity, self pity, or pity for the sad bastard that wrote them. I felt like I was in the process of failing, in the process of letting everyone down. In the process of not supplying the band with songs, not giving the producer the music, not giving the record company tunes—so inside that environment, I was continuing to do just that, come up with these sad bastard songs."

— Dave Matthews

The album was scheduled for release in the second half of 2000. The band eventually decided to scrap the sessions, and perform their summer tour without a completed album to support. The band played a number of new songs that summer from those sessions, including "Grey Street," "Raven," "Sweet Up and Down," "Grace Is Gone," "Bartender," "Digging a Ditch" and the reworked "JTR."

=== "The Summer So Far" ===
Although Rolling Stone referred to The Lillywhite Sessions' original title as The Summer So Far, the album was never intended to be titled as such. The title The Summer So Far was simply the name of the band's most current recording of the sessions, dubbed by engineer Stephen Harris, who later produced Busted Stuff. Dave Matthews himself has claimed in several interviews that he intended to title the final album Busted Stuff, which he eventually did when the band went back in the recording studio in 2002 to re-record the album. The title Lillywhite Sessions was dubbed by fans, and the name stuck.

"When we stopped recording for the band to start their summer tour, I returned to England with one of the eight CDs that I had made. Five for the Band, one for [Steve Lillywhite], one for Bruce Flohr, and the one for myself and had written on them 'the summer so far'. We only did that because all the other CDs that I had made up to then, I had called 'the story so far'. 'The summer so far' was never going to be an album title, by the way, just a way to distinguish what was then the most up-to-date CD."

— Stephen Harris

=== Everyday ===
During the tour, Matthews was introduced to producer Glen Ballard, and discussed completing the shelved Sessions. During the nine days they spent together, Matthews and Ballard wrote an entire album of new songs before the rest of the band had joined them. The album, which featured electric guitar by Matthews and a minimal use of the rest of the band, was released in February 2001 as Everyday.

== Internet leak ==
In March 2001, Craig Knapp, the lead singer of Dave Matthews Band cover band "Ants Marching," received a CD from a friend containing the lost Lillywhite Sessions. He then contacted producer Steve Lillywhite via e-mail inquiring what to do with the tracks, and posted his message on the message boards at Dave Matthews Band fan site "DMBML."

Hello Mr. Lillywhite,

I thank you in advance for taking the time to read this E-mail. I have unintentionally placed myself in a very precarious situation.

About a week ago, I received an E-mail from a DMB fan who claimed they had some unreleased material from the new Dave Matthews Band CD. He asked if I wanted a copy, and I said yes, thinking it was going to be acoustic takes from "Everyday." In any event, I received a package yesterday, and it was indeed the session that you and DMB recorded in Virginia.

I love it very much, excellent work. I am blessed to receive this gift.

My question for you is one of moral standards. I would really like to share these songs with the DMB trading community. However, I feel that if the Dave Matthews Band and Steve Lillywhite didn't release these songs, then what gives me that right? I don't want to disrespect the band, or yourself. I guess my question is simply this:

Am I disrespecting the Dave Matthews Band and Steve Lillywhite by making these songs available?

I would really appreciate a response when you get a chance.

Thank you so much for your time,

Craig Knapp

Knapp received an apparently faked e-mail response from Lillywhite, giving Knapp approval to release the tracks via the Internet. Since Knapp only had a 56k dial-up modem, he decided to transfer the songs to someone with a lot of bandwidth who could host them. Using Napster, Knapp then sent the tracks to a fellow member of DMBML, Drew Wiley, who released over the Internet the 96 kbit/s MP3s. Within days, the tracks were also released as 128 kbit/s MP3s, and later as lossless SHN files. The tracks made their way all over the internet via private servers and peer-to-peer programs like Napster. After the release of Everyday, which many fans complained was too "pop-ish", the leak of the Sessions gave some fans what they wanted—an album recorded much like older Dave Matthews Band material.

=== Demo #2 leak ===
A second demo, referred to as "disc two," had been admitted into existence to the communities after the initial release, and slowly, low-quality leaks of some of the disc started to circulate on Dave Matthews Band fan sites. Most of the information about this disc is from Drew Wiley. Wiley leaked one full song that has been released off this second disc, "Build You a House," a very rough song recorded early in the sessions and dropped later making no appearance on the widely spread Lillywhite Sessions disc. The clips that were released are recordings that Wiley made over the phone while his source played the tracks therefore they have notoriously bad audio quality, but provide a glimpse into what the band was doing during the early part of The Lillywhite Sessions. Songs like "JTR" and "Bartender" in their earliest rawest forms can be found on this disc, as well as an intro to "Grace Is Gone."

Below is a copy of the text file that accompanied the internet-circulated demo:

Dave Matthews Band

The Summer So Far -- Demo #2

(The Lillywhite Sessions)

Producer: Steve Lillywhite

Recorded: Winter 2000 - Summer 2000

Track Name Time

---------------------------------------------------------------------------------------------------

d1t01 Bartender 06:37.94

d1t02 JTR 07:52.70

d1t03 Busted Stuff 03:56.92

d1t04 Sweet Up & Down 04:32.58

d1t05 Diggin' a Ditch 04:15.09

d1t06 Build You a House 03:58.60

d1t07 Captain 05:38.37

d1t08 untitled jam 05:48.18

d1t09 Grace is Gone 07:33.00

d1 totals 50:13:4

== Reception ==
Professional ratings
Review scores
Source	Rating
Allmusic	4/5 stars
Entertainment Weekly	A−

Once the album leaked, attention by fans and media escalated. Many fans were eager for an official release of the sessions. Online feedback from fans, including a website-based campaign called "Release Lillywhite Recordings Campaign," received media attention from Entertainment Weekly and Rolling Stone, which gave the unmastered album better reviews than the successful Everyday. During the 2001 summer tour, the band didn't just debut live versions of the songs from Everyday, but also began to play "Big Eyed Fish," which was on the sessions but up to that point had never been performed live. The Dave Matthews Band was unexpectedly touring behind two albums, the one which they actually released, and the one which they didn't want in the marketplace. In response to the album's leak, Steve Lillywhite said, "I cannot condone the release of these unfinished recordings, although I feel these are some of the most moving pieces of music that I've ever recorded with Dave Matthews Band."

In 2018 singer-songwriter Ryley Walker released a complete cover of the album, also entitled The Lillywhite Sessions.

== Busted Stuff and live performances ==
In 2002 the Dave Matthews Band released Busted Stuff, a new album which contained re-recordings of many of the songs that were left collecting dust with Sessions. The new album contained 11 tracks—nine tracks re-recorded from The Lillywhite Sessions, and two new tracks ("Where Are You Going" and "You Never Know"). "JTR," "Sweet Up and Down," and "Monkey Man," were the three tracks not re-recorded on the album.

"JTR" returned as part of the band's concert rotation, having appeared on the Live at Folsom Field album and played during the 2006 summer tour. It returned again in 2010 and has since been played intermittently during the band's tours. Its most recent performance came during the band's 2024 summer tour.

"Sweet Up and Down" was performed several times by the band during their 2000 summer tour before vanishing from their setlists just a month and a half after the tour's start. It reemerged in 2003 during the Dave Matthews & Friends tour. The song also made a brief return to DMB setlists in 2007, and returned again during the 2010 summer tour. The song would make a return a decade later on February 28, 2020, at a one-off DMB show at the Cosmopolitan in Las Vegas.

"Monkey Man" was never released on an album or played live, making it the only song that is exclusively available on The Lillywhite Sessions.

== Mastered release ==
In April 2006, a self-described recording engineer using the alias of "Karmageddon" mastered the tracks from The Lillywhite Sessions and released them on the Internet. Using the original SHN files released online, Karmageddon burned the songs to a CD-R and ran them through high-end audio mastering equipment, such as a parametric equalizer, audio converters, and a tube compressor. The songs were then balanced to distribute the music evenly through stereo channels, and eventually burned back onto a CD-R. Following the release of the mastered album, "Karmageddon" claimed in an interview that the mastering process he used is "basically the TRUE industry standard as to how a CD gets finalized before mass-production." Once the mastered album was released on the internet, it became the first-ever mastered copy of The Lillywhite Sessions, since the original leaked files were simply raw tracks from the mixing board and were never mastered.
