= Live at Luther College =

Live album by Dave Matthews and Tim Reynolds
- Released: January 19, 1999
- Recorded: February 6, 1996, Luther College, Decorah, Iowa
- Genre: Folk rock
- Length: 2:16:12
- Label: RCA
- Producer: John Alagía

Dave Matthews and Tim Reynolds chronology
Live at Luther College (1999)	Live at Radio City (2007)

Professional ratings
Review scores
Source	Rating
Allmusic	4/5 stars

Live at Luther College is a live album by Dave Matthews and Tim Reynolds recorded at the Center for Faith and Life at Luther College in Decorah, Iowa. Recorded on February 6, 1996, and released nearly three years later, it was the first concert recording by the pair to be made available commercially. The album features several previously unreleased or rare tracks, including "What Will Become of Me?", which would later be used as the basis for the song "Pantala Naga Pampa" on the 1998 studio album Before These Crowded Streets. Six songs would appear on the studio album Crash, released later in 1996.

Live at Luther College was followed eight years later by the duo's Live at Radio City.

== Track listing ==
All songs by David J. Matthews unless noted.

=== Disc one ===
1. "One Sweet World" – 5:43
2. "#41" (Carter Beauford, Stefan Lessard, Matthews, Leroi Moore, Boyd Tinsley) – 5:37
3. "Tripping Billies" – 5:49
4. "Jimi Thing/What Will Become of Me?" – 8:13
5. "Satellite" – 4:39
6. "Crash into Me" – 5:33
7. "Deed is Done" (Beauford, Lessard, Matthews, Moore, Tinsley) – 4:51
8. "Lover Lay Down" – 5:33
9. "What Would You Say" – 5:06
10. "Minarets" – 7:00
11. "Cry Freedom" – 5:39
12. "Dancing Nancies" – 7:15

=== Disc two ===
1. "Typical Situation" – 7:02
2. "Stream" (Reynolds) – 5:49
3. "Warehouse" – 9:17
4. "Christmas Song" – 5:24
5. "Seek Up" – 7:43
6. "Say Goodbye" – 5:19
7. "Ants Marching" – 5:26
8. "Little Thing" – 6:18
9. "Halloween" – 3:00
10. "Granny" – 3:22
11. "Two Step" – 6:34

== Personnel ==
- Dave Matthews – acoustic guitar, vocals
- Tim Reynolds – acoustic guitar

== Charts ==
=== Weekly charts ===
Chart (1999)	Peak position
US Billboard 200	2

=== Year-end charts ===
Chart (1999)	Position
US Billboard 200	68
