= Fenton Williams =

Production designer and video director

Fenton Williams is a production designer and video director. He has worked with Dave Matthews Band since 1991. He began as their road manager and has served as Dave Matthews Band's lighting designer and video director for the last 20 years. He has also worked with acts such as John Mayer, Eric Clapton, and Liza Minnelli and events such as Bonnaroo Music Festival, Z100's Jingle Ball & Nashville Rising.

Other than his work with Dave Matthews Band, Williams worked with Tim McGraw as the set and lighting designer for McGraw's 2010 Southern Voice Tour, 2011 Emotional Traffic Tour, & the Zac Brown Band with his company Filament Productions. In 2004, Williams filled in for Phish's lighting director, Chris Kuroda, for their 3-day gig in Las Vegas. In 2005, Williams founded Filament Productions, a touring video company, based in Charlottesville, VA. In addition to producing the set and lighting design for Tim McGraw's 2010 Southern Voice Tour, Filament Productions is also in charge of the video direction and production design. Williams has also directed many live concert DVDs and Music Videos.

== Credits ==
Year	Artist	Production	Role
2015	Dave Matthews Band	2015 Summer Tour	Production & Lighting Designer
2014	Dave Matthews Band	A Very Special Evening With Dave Matthews Band	Production & Lighting Designer
2013	Dave Matthews Band	2013 Summer Tour	Production & Lighting Designer
2012	Dave Matthews Band	Fall Tour	Production & Lighting Designer
2012	Dave Matthews Band	2012 Summer Tour	Production & Lighting Designer
2012	Zac Brown Band	2012 Tour	Production & Lighting Designer
2011	Zac Brown Band	"Keep Me in Mind" (music video)	Director
2011	Dave Matthews Band	2011 DMB Caravan Festivals	Production & Lighting Designer
2011	Zac Brown Band	2011 Summer Tour	Production & Lighting Designer
2011	Tim McGraw	Emotional Traffic Tour	Production & Lighting Designer
2010	Dave Matthews & Tim Reynolds	Fall Tour	Production & Lighting Designer
2010	Country Strong	Motion Picture	Production Designer (Segments)
2010	Dave Matthews Band	Fall Tour	Production & Lighting Designer
2010	Nashville Rising	Benefit Concert	Production & Lighting Designer
2010	Dave Matthews Band	Summer Tour	Production & Lighting Designer
2010	Tim McGraw	Southern Voice Tour	Production & Lighting Designer
2010	Dave Matthews Band	Europe Winter Tour	Production & Lighting Designer
2009	Dave Matthews & Tim Reynolds	"Live in Las Vegas"	Director & Lighting Designer
2009	Dave Matthews Band	Europe Summer Tour	Production & Lighting Designer
2009	Dave Matthews Band	Summer Tour	Production & Lighting Designer
2009	Dave Matthews Band	"Funny The Way It Is" (music video)	Director
2009	Dave Matthews Band	Spring Tour	Production & Lighting Designer
2008	Dave Matthews Band	South America Fall Tour	Production & Lighting Designer
2008	Dave Matthews Band	Summer Tour	Production & Lighting Designer
2008	Dave Matthews & Tim Reynolds	Spring Tour	Production & Lighting Designer
2007	Dave Matthews Band	"Live at Piedmont Park" concert DVD	Production & Lighting Designer
2007	Dave Matthews Band	Summer Tour	Production & Lighting Designer
2007	Dave Matthews & Tim Reynolds	"Live at Radio City" (concert DVD)	Director & Lighting Designer
2007	Dave Matthews Band	"Eh Hee" (music video)	Director
2007	Dave Matthews Band	Europe Spring Tour	Production & Lighting Designer
2007	Dave Matthews Band	Australia Spring Tour	Production & Lighting Designer
2007	Dave Matthews & Tim Reynolds	Europe Winter Tour	Production & Lighting Designer
2006	Dave Matthews Band	Summer Tour	Production & Lighting Designer
2006	Dave Matthews (solo)	U.K. Spring Tour	Production & Lighting Designer
2005	Dave Matthews Band	Fall Tour	Production & Lighting Designer
2005	Dave Matthews Band	Summer Tour	Production & Lighting Designer
2005	Dave Matthews Band	"Stand Up Take 1" (documentary)	Producer & Cinematographer
2005	Dave Matthews Band	Australia Spring Tour	Production & Lighting Designer
2004	Dave Matthews Band	Vote for Change Tour	Production & Lighting Designer
2004	Dave Matthews Band	Summer Tour	Production & Lighting Designer
2004	Phish	Vegas Run	Lighting Designer
2004	Dave Matthews & Friends	Winter Tour	Production & Lighting Designer
2004	Dave Matthews Band	"The Gorge (album)" (concert DVD)"	Director & Producer & Lighting Designer
2003	Dave Matthews Band	"The Central Park Concert" (concert DVD)	Lighting Designer & Creative Consultant
2003	John Mayer	"Any Given Thursday" (concert DVD)	Lighting Designer
2003	Dave Matthews & Tim Reynolds	Tour	Production & Lighting Designer
2003	Dave Matthews Band	Summer Tour	Production & Lighting Designer
2003	Dave Matthews & Friends	Winter Tour	Production & Lighting Designer
2002	Dave Matthews Band	"Live at Folsom Field, Boulder, Colorado" (concert DVD)	Director & Producer
2002	Dave Matthews Band	Fall Tour	Production & Lighting Designer
2002	Dave Matthews Band	Summer Tour	Production & Lighting Designer
2002	Dave Matthews Band	Spring Tour	Production & Lighting Designer
2002	Eric Clapton	"One More Car, One More Rider - Live on Tour 2001" (concert DVD)	Assistant Director
2002	Bonnaroo	2002 Bonnaroo Music Festival	Performance Director
2001	Dave Matthews (solo)	Fall Tour	Production & Lighting Designer
2001	Dave Matthews Band	Summer Tour	Production & Lighting Designer
2000	Dave Matthews Band	Fall Tour	Lighting Designer
2000	Dave Matthews Band	Summer Tour	Lighting Designer
1999	Dave Matthews Band	"Listener Supported (album)" (concert DVD)	Lighting Designer
1999	Dave Matthews Band	Summer Tour	Lighting Designer
1999	Dave Matthews & Tim Reynolds	Tour	Lighting Designer
1998	Dave Matthews Band	Fall Tour	Lighting Designer
1998	Dave Matthews Band	Summer Tour	Lighting Designer
1998	Dave Matthews Band	Summer Europe Tour	Lighting Designer
1998	Dave Matthews Band	Spring Tour	Lighting Designer
1997	Dave Matthews Band	Summer Tour	Lighting Designer
1997	Dave Matthews & Tim Reynolds	Tour	Lighting Designer
1996	Dave Matthews Band	New Year's Run Tour	Lighting Designer
1996	Dave Matthews Band	Fall Tour	Lighting Designer
1996	Dave Matthews Band	H.O.R.D.E. Tour	Lighting Designer
1996	Dave Matthews Band	Summer Europe Tour	Lighting Designer
1996	Dave Matthews Band	Summer Tour	Lighting Designer
1996	Dave Matthews Band	Spring International Tour	Lighting Designer
1996	Dave Matthews & Tim Reynolds	Tour	Lighting Designer
1995	Dave Matthews Band	New Year's Run Tour	Lighting Designer
1995	Dave Matthews Band	Summer Tour	Lighting Designer
1995	Dave Matthews Band	Summer Europe Tour	Lighting Designer
1995	Dave Matthews Band	Spring Tour	Lighting Designer
1995	Dave Matthews Band	Spring Europe Tour	Lighting Designer
1995	Dave Matthews Band	Winter Tour	Lighting Designer
1994	Dave Matthews Band	New Year's Run Tour	Lighting Designer
1994	Dave Matthews Band	Fall Tour	Lighting Designer
1994	Dave Matthews Band	Summer Tour	Lighting Designer
1994	Dave Matthews Band	Spring Tour	Lighting Designer
1994	Dave Matthews Band	Winter Tour	Lighting Designer
1994	Dave Matthews & Tim Reynolds	Tour	Lighting Designer
1993	Dave Matthews Band	New Year's Run Tour	Lighting Designer
1993	Dave Matthews Band	Fall Tour	Lighting Designer
1993	Dave Matthews Band	Summer Tour	Lighting Designer
1993	Dave Matthews Band	Spring Tour	Lighting Designer
1993	Dave Matthews Band	Winter Tour	Lighting Designer
1993	Dave Matthews & Tim Reynolds	Tour	Lighting Designer
1992	Dave Matthews Band	Fall Tour	Lighting Designer
1992	Dave Matthews Band	Summer Tour	Lighting Designer
1992	Dave Matthews Band	Winter Tour	Lighting Designer

All tours took place in North America unless otherwise noted.
