= Tribe of Heaven =

Musical collaboration between Mark Roebuck and Dave Matthews

Tribe of Heaven is a collaboration between Mark Roebuck and Dave Matthews, recorded in 1989.

Dave Matthews was a fellow bartender to Mark Roebuck, and assisted Roebuck in writing and recording an entire album. Ten folk rock songs were recorded during the Tribe of Heaven sessions. Of these nine were ultimately released, including five written solely by Roebuck, three by Roebuck and Matthews, and a cover of U2's "In God's Country." The tracks were recorded at the studio in Greg Howard's home in Scottsville, Virginia during two separate sessions in 1989. Howard played keyboards on "Imagine We Were" and "Half the Time," and Mike Rosenski played guitar on "Touch."

Imagine We Were was offered to various record labels in early 1990, but no deal was ever established. Matthews went on to form Dave Matthews Band the next year, and included a Tribe of Heaven song, "The Song That Jane Likes," on the band's first album, Remember Two Things.

== Imagine We Were ==
Imagine We Were

Studio album by Tribe of Heaven
- Released: March 15, 2005
- Recorded: Scottsville, Virginia, 1989
- Genre: Folk rock
- Label: Fear of the Atom

Dave Matthews chronology
Some Devil (2003)	Imagine We Were (2005)	Live at Radio City (2007)

Below is a track listing of Tribe of Heaven's only album, Imagine We Were, released in 2005, over 15 years after its initial recording.

1. "Simple Thing"
2. "In God's Country"
3. "The Song That Jane Likes"
4. "Imagine We Were"
5. "Touch"
6. "Waves Drift Ashore"
7. "One War"
8. "Half the Time"
9. "Subway"
