= The Lillywhite Sessions (Ryley Walker album) =

Studio album by Ryley Walker
- Released: November 16, 2018
- Studio: Hefty
- Genre: Folk
- Length: 74:27
- Label: Dead Oceans
- Producer: John Hughes

Ryley Walker chronology
Deafman Glance (2018)	The Lillywhite Sessions (2018)	Little Common Twist (2019)

Singles from The Lillywhite Sessions
- 1. "Busted Stuff" Released: September 25, 2023; 2. "Diggin' a Ditch" Released: October 23, 2023

The Lillywhite Sessions is the fifth solo studio album by American musician Ryley Walker. It was released on November 16, 2018, through Dead Oceans. The album is a track-by-track cover of The Lillywhite Sessions, a popular bootleg album by Dave Matthews Band, which primarily consists of demos for material which was temporarily shelved before being re-recorded for the band's 2002 album Busted Stuff.

Walker's version of The Lillywhite Sessions was a critical success, with many publications commending the diverse interpretations of the material and melding of disparate styles; the album was also praised by Dave Matthews himself.

== Background ==
In the summer of 2000, Dave Matthews Band started work with longtime producer Steve Lillywhite on what was to be their fourth studio album. However, the band grew dissatisfied with the dark, somber direction in which the sessions were heading, and so the recordings were shelved. Matthews then flew to Los Angeles to work with producer Glen Ballard on the songs, but the pair quickly wrote new material which would make up the album Everyday (2001). However, soon after the release of Everyday, the songs recorded with Lillywhite were leaked through the Internet and have since been commonly referred to by fans as The Lillywhite Sessions. Nine of the twelve songs from The Lillywhite Sessions were re-recorded with producer Stephen Harris for Busted Stuff, released as the follow-up to Everyday in 2002.

Walker's version of The Lillywhite Sessions is the second of two albums he released in 2018, following Deafman Glance, an album Walker stated he "wanted to sound like the Dave record". In an interview with Stereogum, he mentioned having first discussed tackling the band's more well-known songs, such as "Crash into Me" (1996), before deciding to instead attract attention to more obscure material. After deciding on covering The Lillywhite Sessions, Walker convened with bassist Andrew Scott Young to rehearse the songs and plan out arrangements.

== Music ==
Walker's renditions range from simple arrangements faithful to the originals to radical re-interpretations. He described the process of creating the arrangements as "the most fun — and easiest time — I’ve had developing songs". Walker stressed that despite the project being a cover of an "unfinished" album, he was not "trying to cap it off as, like, 'this is the better version'". Some songs feature extended jams, whilst others experiment with entirely different genres and moods. The title track was recorded in a jazz-rock style, with Walker using a hollow-body guitar. "Grey Street" was performed in a slower, more somber arrangement; Walker cited slowcore/sadcore band Red House Painters as a significant influence on his version. "Digging a Ditch" was originally performed in a style similar to the original, until Young proposed speeding up the song and playing it in a "Sonic Youth, Yo La Tengo… Dino Jr. style".

While Walker considered the creation of the new arrangements to be a mostly easy process, he found covering "Monkey Man" to be challenging, particularly due to his dislike of the song. The finished version is an avant-garde-style noise collage, performed in one take with heavy amounts of post-production. Conversely, the version of "Bartender" appearing on the album sticks closely to the original, as Walker felt it had many similarities to "drone-y psych folk… my favorite music in the world". Similarly, "Grace is Gone", which Walker credited with renewing his interest in Matthews, was performed in line with the original.

== Reception ==
Professional ratings
Aggregate scores
Source	Rating
Metacritic	71/100
Review scores
Source	Rating
AllMusic	4/5 stars
Exclaim!	8/10
The Observer	3/5 stars
Paste	7.4/10
Pitchfork	7.8/10
Under the Radar	6.5/10 stars

The Lillywhite Sessions garnered a positive reception from critics; on Metacritic, which assigns a normalized score out 100 to ratings from publications, the album received a weighted mean score of 71 based on 11 reviews, indicating "generally positive reviews".

Writing for Pitchfork, Paul Thompson felt the album tried to "seek a kind of rapprochment" between Walker's appreciation for DMB and current favorite artists of his. Thompson highlighted the extended jamming on "JTR" as the album's "most out-there moment" and the point where the project "truly comes into its own". He additionally praised the album's diversity, saying that across the first four songs in particular, "Walker and company manage to sound like four completely different bands". AllMusic's Stephen Thomas Erlewine felt that Walker's decision to stay true to the original versions of many of the songs helped to make apparent the influence of the original album on his own music, while also "highlighting the imagination between the original set of songs".

In a review for Paste, Annie Galvin listed "Grey Street" and "Digging a Ditch" among the album's high points, describing the former as an "avant-garde tone piece that unravels like a symphonic soundtrack to the apocalypse" and praising the latter's "gut-punch percussion" and "J Mascis–style sawing on electric guitar". Galvin also praised the album's more faithful renditions, such as "Bartender" and "Grace Is Gone", while criticizing the instrumentation of "Big Eyed Fish" as "boastful noodling" and calling the "discordant interpretation" of "Monkey Man" "unlistenable at times".

Dave Matthews expressed his support and appreciation for the project, referring to it as "much more than a cover record".

== Track listing ==
All tracks are written by Dave Matthews Band.

The Lillywhite Sessions
No.	Title	Length
1.	"Busted Stuff"	5:54
2.	"Grey Street"	8:07
3.	"Diggin' a Ditch"	3:17
4.	"Sweet Up and Down"	4:24
5.	"JTR"	10:50
6.	"Big Eyed Fish"	3:49
7.	"Grace Is Gone"	6:14
8.	"Captain"	5:56
9.	"Bartender"	10:30
10.	"Monkey Man"	5:08
11.	"Kit Kat Jam"	5:36
12.	"Raven"	4:42
Total length:		74:27

== Personnel ==
- Ryley Walker – vocals, electric guitar, acoustic guitar
- Andrew Scott Young – double bass, electric bass, vocals
- Ryan Jewell – drums, percussion
- Quin Kirchner – additional percussion
- Nick Mazarrella – saxophone
- Rick Embach – vibraphone
- John Hughes – synthesizer, vocals
