= Granny (song) =

Song by Dave Matthews Band
- Length: 3:56
- Songwriter(s): David J. Matthews
- Producer(s): Steve Lillywhite

"Granny" is a song by Virginia-based jam band Dave Matthews Band. Though never released on an official studio album, "Granny" was dropped from the Under the Table and Dreaming sessions. This song was originally intended to be the first single from that album.

The song does not use LeRoi Moore or Boyd Tinsley on their respective instruments because the song is focused around a guitar melody without accompaniment. The song also features very sparse use of Carter Beauford's drumming throughout the main section. However, the final section of the song includes the repetition of the lyrics "Love...Baby..." where many members of the band sing at the same time. The song remains popular on live setlists to this day and appears on some live albums by the band including Listener Supported, The Central Park Concert and The Gorge. The song is approximately four minutes in length.

This song is one of the most popular regularly played songs of all time. It was played most in 1993 where it was one of the top three most played songs through every consecutive tour for that year. All this promotion was probably because "Granny" was supposed to be the band's first single. Dave Matthews admitted that the band envisioned people walking the streets chanting "LOVE! BABY!", and for a while the crowd did chant at several shows during other songs in the setlist.

Although it was confirmed to be the only unreleased song recorded for Under The Table and Dreaming, it never made it to any other studio albums and is now known for its steady occasional playing. An acoustic version performed by Matthews and Tim Reynolds is included on their album Live at Luther College, recorded in 1996 and released in 1999.

The 2014 deluxe re-release version of Under the Table and Dreaming includes the aforementioned studio version of the song.
