= I Did It =

I Did It may refer to:

== Music ==
- "I Did It" (Dave Matthews Band song), 2001
- "I Did It" (Spica song), 2014
- "I Did It" (DJ Khaled song), 2021
- "I Did It", a 1970 song by Barbara Acklin, written by Eugene Record

== Others ==
- I Did It (film), a 1909 short film
- If I Did It, a 2007 novel by O. J. Simpson and Pablo Fenjves (sometimes stylized where "if" is not easily visible on the cover)
