= Loving Wings =

Single by Dave Matthews Band

"Loving Wings" is a song by the American band Dave Matthews Band (DMB). Having been released on 6 different live albums, "Loving Wings" is the most widely released song that has not been recorded for a studio album that Dave Matthews Band has released. It has been fully played a total of 94 times during various concerts.

== History of the song ==
The initial phase of the song began as an instrumental introduction to the song "Where Are You Going" having first been played live on May 10, 2002 at the Pepsi Center in Denver, Colorado. Initially started as a guitar riff by Dave Matthews, by the summer of 2002 the song grew into the more commonly known version with every member of the band playing a part.

== Live releases ==
- The Gorge Dave Matthews Band
- The Gorge Special Edition Dave Matthews Band
- Dave Matthews Benaroya Hall, Seattle, WA 24 October 2002 DMBLive Series, Dave Matthews Solo
- Live Trax Vol. 2: Golden Gate Park DMB Live Trax Series, Dave Matthews Band
- Live Trax Vol. 40: Madison Square Garden DMB Live Trax Series, Dave Matthews Band
- Warehouse 5 Vol. 8 Warehouse Compilation, Dave Matthews Band
- Warehouse 8 Vol. 5 Warehouse Compilation, Dave Matthews Band
- Live In Las Vegas Dave Matthews and Tim Reynolds
