= Mark Roebuck =

American musician

- Born: Mark Morgan Roebuck; November 23, 1958 (age 67); New Orleans, Louisiana, United States
- Genres: Folk, rock and roll
- Occupations: Musician, songwriter
- Instruments: Vocals, guitar
- Years active: 1982–present
- Labels: Bearsville, Not Lame, Fear of the Atom
- Website: deal-band.com/main.html

Mark Roebuck is an American composer and musician living near Charlottesville, Virginia, known primarily for his work as the main songwriter for the 1980s underground power pop group The Deal, and for his later project, Tribe of Heaven. Imagine We Were, recorded with Dave Matthews in 1989-90 and was finally put out as an independent release in 2005.

== Early career ==
Born in New Orleans, Louisiana, United States Roebuck moved at age four to Petersburg, Virginia. In his teens, he began writing and recording original music and playing professionally as a folk duo with classmate Eric Schwartz. In 1977 Roebuck and Schwartz both moved to Charlottesville to attend the University of Virginia. There they met Memphis musician and classmate Haines Fullerton and formed The Deal. They eventually added Hugh Patton and Jim Jones to the lineup and began playing up and down the east coast, while continuing to record demos of their original material. In 1982, they signed with Premier Talent Agency and completed a management contract with former Ramones manager Linda S. Stein. In 1983 Albert Grossman, head of Warner Bros. Records subsidiary label Bearsville Records, signed the band to a five-album recording contract. In late 1983, The Deal recorded Time Won't Come Back, a five-song EP produced by Richard Gottehrer. Shortly thereafter Warner Bros. severed ties with Bearsville, and the EP was never released. In 1984 Hugh Patton and Eric Schwartz left the band. Former Big Star drummer Jody Stephens briefly signed on, but left and was replaced by Mike Clark. With this new lineup, The Deal began working on a second EP, provisionally titled Tuesday Gone To Ruin, which was completed in late 1985. It included five new original songs, and a guitar solo by fellow Bearsville artist Todd Rundgren. In January, 1986 Albert Grossman died of a massive coronary while flying on the Concorde to a musical convention in Europe, effectively ending Bearsville's status as an active company in the music industry, and ending any chance for the release of the second EP. Roebuck and the other members of the Deal were on the verge of calling it quits when Jody Stephens, by then running Ardent Studios in Memphis, offered the band a spec deal to record an entire album. The result was Brave New World, completed in 1987. The record included some percussion contributions from Stephens as well as a few background vocals from Stephens' Big Star bandmate Alex Chilton. The project was shopped unsuccessfully to major labels, and was eventually released independently. It was largely a critical success, called by the Washington Post, 'remarkably assured pop classicism,' and it led to The Deal being named by Musician Magazine one of the twenty best unsigned bands in the world. However, sales were limited, and in fall 1988 the Deal finally broke up. The music of the Deal remained firmly in obscurity until 2003 when a power pop independent label, Not Lame Recordings, released Goodbye September, a 14-song anthology of the Deal's music. The record was highly praised and became one of Not Lame's best selling releases of that year.

In 1989, after the breakup of the Deal, Roebuck invited then-fellow-bartender Dave Matthews to write and record a folk-acoustic CD. They recorded ten songs at the Scottsville, Virginia studio of Charlottesville musician Greg Howard, calling the project Tribe of Heaven, Imagine We Were. Roebuck was simultaneously working with musicians Mike Colley and TR3's Warren Richardson on another vastly different project, Burning Core. Burning Core fused elements of rap, metal, funk, and jazz and included a co-written composition with future Dave Matthews Band keyboardist Peter Griesar. In 1990 Roebuck traveled to New York with both projects, but was unable to secure a major label deal. Matthews went on to form the Dave Matthews Band, and Roebuck, then working as a bartender at the restaurant Eastern Standard, gave the band their first paying gig. He had them perform every Tuesday night for $50.00, plus free beer and liquor. One of the songs co-written by Matthews and Roebuck on the Tribe of Heaven project, "The Song That Jane Likes," was included on the Dave Matthews Band's first CD Remember Two Things as well as RCA's 2004 release The Gorge. The song has also been included on Volumes 12, 16, 18, and 20 of RCA's Live Trax Series, all released between 2008 and 2012. 15 years after its completion, Tribe of Heaven, Imagine We Were was finally put out as a nine-song independent release in 2005.

== Later projects ==
In 1996, Roebuck and Burning Core bandmate Mike Colley formed the rap-rock quartet SubSeven. In 1998 they put out an eleven-song CD entitled Wild Hallucinations From the Deep Sleep Deprivation. In 2000, after several years away from music, Roebuck joined Big Circle, an ensemble made up of fellow Charlottesville musicians Charlie Pastorfield, Rusty Speidel, Jim Ralston, Tim Anderson, and Tony Fischer. Their 2004 CD Things May Change garnered excellent reviews and was given a 4-Star Rating by the AllMusic. Mark Roebuck released two projects after the end of Big Circle: 2007's Some Half-Remembered Thing with Noonday Ruin and the 2011 acoustic project Midnight To Morning done in collaboration with Tony Fischer.

In 2016 Roebuck began an ongoing collaboration with Tim Ryan and Michael Clarke, releasing ''The World And All Within'' that year. That project led directly to the formation of the band Kingdom of Mustang, with the addition of Rusty Speidel. Kingdom of Mustang has released five full-length albums since 2018.

Since 2001, he has been married to Julie Henshaw Roebuck, a Psychiatric Nurse Practitioner. They have one child.

== Discography ==
- The Deal, Time Won't Come Back (Unreleased) Warner Bros. Records/ Bearsville Records (1983)
- The Deal, Tuesday Gone To Ruin (Unreleased) Bearsville Records (1985)
- The Deal, Brave New World, (LP/Cassette) Rainbeat Records (1987)
- SubSeven, Wild Hallucinations From The Deep Sleep Deprivation, (CD/Digital) Fear of the Atom Records (1998)
- The Deal, Goodbye September, (CD/Digital) Not Lame Records (2003)
- Big Circle, Things May Change, (CD/Digital) Fear of the Atom Records (2004)
- Tribe of Heaven, Imagine We Were, (CD) Fear of the Atom Records (2005)
- Mark Roebuck with Noonday Ruin, Some Half-Remembered Thing, (CD/Digital) Fear of the Atom Records (2007)
- Mark Roebuck and Tony Fischer, Midnight To Morning, (CD/Digital) Fear of the Atom Records (2011)
- Burning Core, Beast (Songs 1989-92), (Digital) Fear of the Atom Records (2011)
- Mark Roebuck with Michael Clarke and Tim Ryan, The World And All Within, (CD/Digital) Fear of the Atom Records (2016)
- Kingdom of Mustang, Kingdom of Mustang, (CD/Digital) KOM Records (2018)
- Kingdom of Mustang, MORE, (CD/Digital) KOM Records (2019)
- Kingdom of Mustang, Tales From The Atomic Tambourine, (CD/Digital) KOM Records (2020)
- Kingdom of Mustang, Into Beautiful Blue, (CD/Digital) KoolKat Music / KOM Records (2022)
- Kingdom of Mustang, Glad Days, (CD/Digital) KoolKat Music / KOM Records (2024)

=== Guest appearances ===
- Charlie Pastorfield, Maybe We Have Changed, (LP) White Line Records (1982)
- Shannon Worrell, Three Wishes, (CD) Super Duke Records (1994)
