= Too Much (Dave Matthews Band song) =

1996 single by Dave Matthews Band

Single by Dave Matthews Band

from the album Crash
- Released: April 1996
- Studio: Bearsville (Woodstock, New York)
- Length: 4:21 (album version); 3:45 (radio edit)
- Label: RCA
- Songwriters: Carter Beauford; Stefan Lessard; Dave Matthews; LeRoi Moore; Boyd Tinsley
- Producer: Steve Lillywhite

Dave Matthews Band singles chronology
"Satellite" (1995)	"Too Much" (1996)	"So Much to Say" (1996)

"Too Much" is a song by American rock group Dave Matthews Band. It was released in April 1996 as the lead single off their second studio album, Crash (1996). The song reached number five on the US Billboard Modern Rock Tracks chart and number one on the Billboard Triple-A chart, giving the band their first number-one single on that ranking. "Too Much" later appeared on the Dave Matthews Band compilation album The Best of What's Around Vol. 1.

== Track listings ==
US single

1. "Too Much" (Album Version) – 4:20
2. "Too Much" (Edit) – 3:45

International single 1

1. "Too Much" (Edit) – 3:45
2. "Too Much" (Album Version) – 4:20
3. "Jimi Thing" (Live at Luther College) – 7:49

International single 2

1. "Too Much" (Edit) – 3:45
2. "Ants Marching" (Album Version) – 4:31
3. "Jimi Thing" (Acoustic) – 7:49

== Charts ==
=== Weekly charts ===
Chart (1996)	Peak position
Australia (ARIA)	91
Canada Top Singles (RPM)	23
Canada Adult Contemporary (RPM)	48
Canada Rock/Alternative (RPM)	14
US Adult Alternative Airplay (Billboard)	1
US Alternative Airplay (Billboard)	5
US Mainstream Rock (Billboard)	9

=== Year-end charts ===
Chart (1996)	Position
US Mainstream Rock Tracks (Billboard)	44
US Modern Rock Tracks (Billboard)	36
US Triple A (Billboard)	9
