= Dave Matthews and Tim Reynolds =

American musical duo

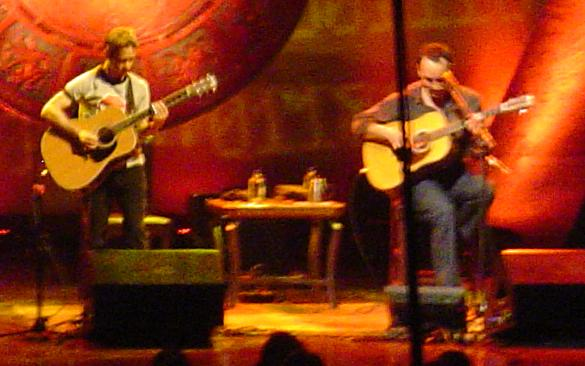
- Matthews and Reynolds live in Boston

Background information
- Also known as: Dave and Tim
- Origin: Charlottesville, Virginia, US
- Genres: Rock, jazz fusion, jam
- Years active: 1993–present
- Labels: RCA (US)
- Spinoff of: Dave Matthews Band
- Members: Dave Matthews; Tim Reynolds
- Website: dmband.com

Dave Matthews and Tim Reynolds or Dave and Tim is a musical act composed of Dave Matthews, member of Dave Matthews Band, and Tim Reynolds, member of TR3 and Dave Matthews Band.

== History ==
Matthews and Reynolds met in Charlottesville, Virginia, while Matthews was a bartender at Miller's. Reynolds encouraged Matthews' musical growth. Matthews wanted to join Reynolds' band TR3, but Reynolds told him to form his own band.

Matthews went on to form Dave Matthews Band (DMB). Reynolds has occasionally joined the band in the studio, as on the albums Under the Table and Dreaming, Crash, Before These Crowded Streets, Big Whiskey and the GrooGrux King, Away from the World, Come Tomorrow and as a touring member of DMB.

By 1993, as a side project, Matthews and Reynolds performed several acoustic set shows, first on April 22, 1993.

From this point onward, they always played acoustic, and they always played every year together (with the exception of the following years: 2000, 2001 and 2002), whether as Dave and Tim, Matthews guesting with TR3, Reynolds guesting with Dave Matthews Band, or Matthews and Reynolds playing in the band Dave Matthews and Friends.

== Discography ==
=== Live albums ===
Title	Album details
Live at Luther College	Released: January 19, 1999; Label: RCA; Formats: CD
Live at Radio City	Released: August 14, 2007; Label: RCA; Formats: CD, DVD, Blu-Ray
Live in Las Vegas	Released: February 9, 2010; Label: RCA; Formats: CD

=== DMBLive ===
Title	Album details
DMBLive Prism Coffeehouse Charlottesville, VA 4/22/1993	Released: December 19, 2008; Label: RCA; Formats: Vinyl, Digital download
DMBLive Appalachian State University Boone, NC 3/29/2003	Released: September 29, 2009; Label: RCA; Formats: Digital download
DMBLive Memphis, Richmond, VA 6/13/1993	Released: March 15, 2012; Label: RCA; Formats: Digital download
DMBLive J.T. Kingsbury Hall Salt Lake City, UT 3/3/1999	Released: January 14, 2014; Label: RCA; Formats: Digital download

=== Extended plays ===
Title	Album details
The Boots	Released: July 25, 2013; Label: RCA; Formats: CD
Blenheim Vineyards Painted Series Vol. 1	Released: July 7, 2014; Label: RCA; Formats: CD
Blenheim Vineyards Painted Series Vol. 2	Released: July 2015; Label: RCA; Formats: CD
Blenheim Vineyards Painted Series Vol. 3	Released: July 2016; Label: RCA; Formats: CD
Blenheim Vineyards Painted Series Vol. 4	Released: July 2017; Label: RCA; Formats: CD
Blenheim Vineyards Painted Series Vol. 5	Released: July 2018; Label: RCA; Formats: CD
Blenheim Vineyards Painted Series Vol. 6	Released: July 5, 2019; Label: RCA; Formats: CD
Blenheim Vineyards Painted Series Vol. 7	Released: August 17, 2020; Label: RCA; Formats: CD
Blenheim Vineyards Painted Series Vol. 8	Released: July 20, 2021; Label: RCA; Formats: CD
Blenheim Vineyards Painted Series Vol. 9	Released: July 21, 2022; Label: RCA; Formats: CD
Blenheim Vineyards Painted Series Vol. 10	Released: July 3, 2023; Label: RCA; Formats: Digital Download

== See also ==
- Dave Matthews
- Tim Reynolds
- Dave Matthews Band
- Dave Matthews and Friends
