= Ether Ore =

Studio album by Greg Howard
- Released: March 22, 2005
- Recorded: October 2003 – December 2004
- Genre: -
- Length: 56:15
- Label: Espresso
- Producer: -

Greg Howard chronology
Lift (2000)	Ether Ore (2005)

Professional ratings
Review scores
Source	Rating
StickNews	(Favorable)

Ether Ore is a solo album from one of the Chapman Stick frontrunners, Greg Howard. Containing tracks recorded live over a period of several months, it brings Howard's strong sense of improvisation across, into the ears of the listener.

== Track listing ==
1. "The First Day" - 2:09
2. "Ether Ore" - 11:03
3. "Tim Was Here" - 1:56
4. "Neptune's Wake" - 9:27
5. "Snow Falling on Eno" - 2:59
6. "Freedom of Expansion" - 25:33
7. "Deep Field Calling" - 3:08

== Personnel ==
- Greg Howard - Chapman Stick
