= Some Devil =

Studio album by Dave Matthews
- Released: September 23, 2003
- Recorded: October 2002–June 2003 at Studio Litho, Seattle, Washington
- Genre: Rock
- Length: 59:14
- Label: RCA
- Producer: Stephen Harris

Dave Matthews chronology
Live at Luther College (1999)	Some Devil (2003)	Imagine We Were (2005)

Singles from Some Devil
- 1. "Gravedigger" Released: 2003; 2. "Save Me" Released: 2003; 3. "Oh" Released: 2004

Professional ratings
Review scores
Source	Rating
AllMusic	3.5/5 stars
PopMatters	N/A

Some Devil is the debut solo studio album by musician Dave Matthews. It was released on September 23, 2003, on RCA Records. It has been certified platinum by the RIAA, signifying over a million copies sold. The album features several guest musicians, including long-time Dave Matthews Band collaborator guitarist Tim Reynolds and Phish frontman and guitarist Trey Anastasio. The album's first single, "Gravedigger", won a Grammy Award in 2004. Some Devil was recorded at Studio Litho in Seattle, Washington, and produced by Stephen Harris, who had previously worked with the Dave Matthews Band on their 2002 album Busted Stuff.

Of the album, Matthews said:

"I hadn't really been thinking about doing a solo album until I had a handful of songs that didn't really fit with the band, so I started with those and it just grew into a full record," Matthews said. "I kind of thought it'd be fun to put it out."

Many fans, while at first skeptical of Matthews' desire to release a solo album, quickly praised his efforts. The album is noted for its moodier tone and the fresh direction shown in Matthews' songwriting.

Since 2003, Matthews has performed Some Devil material in concert with a group coined Dave Matthews & Friends, which consisted mainly of musicians that appear on the album. He has also played album material solo and with long-time acoustic duo partner Tim Reynolds. During the 2008 summer tour, Dave Matthews Band played "Gravedigger" and "So Damn Lucky" regularly, with "Stay or Leave" following suit during the 2009 summer tour.

The song "Some Devil" featured in the House episode "Love Hurts", the Freeform show Pretty Little Liars, and the closing credits to the 2003 film 21 Grams. Finally, the song "So Damn Lucky" is in The CW show Privileged.

The limited-edition version of the album includes a 7-track bonus CD featuring songs from the Dave Matthews/Tim Reynolds 2003 tour. These are Grey Street (4-3-03, Elliott Hall of Music, Purdue University); When the World Ends (3-28-03, Lawrence Joel Veterans Memorial Coliseum); Jimi Thing (3-22-03, Radio City Music Hall); Stay or Leave (4-3-03, Elliott Hall of Music, Purdue University); Seek up (3-20-03, Ryan Center, University of Rhode Island); Crush (3-28-03, Lawrence Joel Veterans Memorial Coliseum) and Drive In Drive Out (3-20-03, Ryan Center, University of Rhode Island).

== Track listing ==
All songs by Dave J. Matthews unless noted.

1. "Dodo" – 4:57
2. "So Damn Lucky" (Matthews, Harris) – 4:34
3. "Gravedigger" – 3:53
4. "Some Devil" – 4:04
5. "Trouble" (Matthews, Harris) – 5:44
6. "Grey Blue Eyes" (Matthews, Anastasio, Harris) – 3:01
7. "Save Me" – 4:33
8. "Stay or Leave" – 4:02
9. "An' Another Thing" – 5:30
10. "Oh" – 2:48
11. "Baby" – 2:19
12. "Up and Away" – 4:19
13. "Too High" – 5:38
14. "Gravedigger" (acoustic) – 3:52

== Personnel ==
Musicians

- Dave Matthews — vocals, guitars (1), acoustic guitar (2, 3, 7–14), electric guitar (2, 4, 13), sitar guitar (2), baritone guitar (8), vocal percussion (8)
  with:
- Brady Blade — drums (1–3, 5, 7, 8, 10, 12, 13), percussion (1, 2, 5, 7, 9, 10, 12)
- Tony Hall — bass guitar (1–3, 5, 7, 8, 10, 12, 13)
- Tim Reynolds — guitar (1, 2, 5, 7, 12), electric guitar (3), acoustic guitar (8, 10), sitar guitar (13)
- Trey Anastasio — electric guitar (2, 3, 6, 12), piano (2), intro guitar (1)
- Stephen Harris — keyboards (1, 5, 9, 12), harmonium (6, 10), programming (1, 2, 5, 6, 9), percussion (3)

Additional musicians

- Alex Veley — organ (7, 12)
- Dirty Dozen Brass Band — horns (1)
  - Roger Lewis – baritone saxophone
  - Kevin Harris – tenor saxophone
  - Efrem Towns – flugelhorn
  - Sammy Williams – trombone
- Audrey Riley – string arrangements (2, 3, 8, 9, 13, 14), horn arrangements (4, 13), orchestral arrangements (11)
- Seattlemusic Group Strings – strings (2, 3, 8, 9, 13, 14)
  - Leonid Keylin, Misha Keylin, Mikhail Schmidt, John Weller, Jean Wells Yablonsky, Peter Kaman, Paul Shure, Bonnie Douglas, Gennady Filimonov, Jennifer Bai, Karen Bentley, Anne Sokol, Steve Bryant, Jennifer Sokol, Clark Story, Mariel Bailey, Marcia Steel, Jamie Laval, Xiao-Po Fei – violin
  - Vincent Comer, Susan Bryant, Cynthia Morrow, Dajana Hobson, Wes Dyring, Shari Link, Michael Lieberman, Eileen Swanson, Andrea Schuler, Heather Bentley – viola
  - David Sabee, Walter Gray, Bruce Bailey, Roberta Downey, Theresa Benshoof, Jackie Robbins, Rajan Krishnaswami, Clare Garabedian – cello
  - Jordan Anderson, Todd Gowers, Chuck Deardorf, Anna Doak – bass
- Seattlemusic Group Horns (Mark Robbins, Susan Carroll, James Weaver, Rodger Burnett) — horns (2, 4, 5, 9, 13)
- Seattlemusic String Quartet – strings (11)
  - Leonid Keylin, Misha Keylin – violin
  - Vincent Comer – viola
  - David Sabee – cello
- Total Experience Gospel Choir — backing vocals (7)
  - DeShe' Brooks-Wright, Tanisha Brooks, Gena Brooks, Lulu Strange, Mary Strange, Sherri Charleston-Johnson – choir
  - Patrinell Wright – director

Technical personnel

- Mark Branch – second orchestral engineering (2, 3, 8, 9, 11, 13, 14)
- Rob Haggett – mixing assistant (6, 9, 14), assistant mix Pro Tools engineer
- Stephen Harris – producer, mixing (4, 6, 9, 11, 12, 14)
- Sam Hofstedt – additional assistant engineer
- Ted Jensen – mastering
- Ric Levy – mixing assistant (12)
- Floyd Reitsma – assistant engineer (1–10, 12–14), mixing assistant (4, 11)
- John Schluckender – second orchestral engineering (2, 3, 8, 9, 11, 13, 14)
- Mark "Spike" Stent – mixing (1–3, 5, 8, 10, 13)
- Dave Treahearn – assistant mix Pro Tools engineer
- Brian Valentino – assistant engineer (11), string Pro Tools engineering (2, 3, 8, 13, 14)
- Paul "P-Dub" Walton – mix Pro Tools engineer
- John Whynot – orchestral engineering (2, 3, 8, 9, 11, 13, 14)

== Charts ==
=== Weekly charts ===
Chart (2003)	Peak position
Italian Albums (FIMI)	46
US Billboard 200	2

=== Year-end charts ===
Chart (2003)	Position
US Billboard 200	65
Chart (2004)	Position
US Billboard 200	190
