= Everyday (Dave Matthews Band song) =

2001 single by Dave Matthews Band

Single by Dave Matthews Band

from the album Everyday
- Released: October 15, 2001
- Length: 4:44 (album version); 4:10 (radio edit)
- Label: RCA
- Songwriters: David J. Matthews; Glen Ballard
- Producer: Glen Ballard

Dave Matthews Band singles chronology
"The Space Between" (2001)	"Everyday" (2001)	"Where Are You Going" (2002)

Music video
- "Everyday" on YouTube

"Everyday" a song from American rock band Dave Matthews Band's album Everyday, appearing as the closing track. Released as the album's third and final single in October 2001, it gave the band their sixth number-one single (and third consecutive) on the US Billboard Triple-A chart. A live version of "Everyday" is included on the Dave Matthews Band compilation album The Best of What's Around Vol. 1. The song evolved from an earlier Dave Matthews Band song entitled "#36" and references "All You Need Is Love" by the Beatles.

== Release ==
"Everyday" was not originally supposed to be the third single from the album. "When the World Ends" was originally slated to be the single, but after the September 11 attacks, it was thought that the dark title would not be appropriate. "Everyday" was serviced to US triple-A radio on October 15, 2001.

== Music video ==
A music video for the song was concepted and directed by then TBWA\Chiat\Day North America creative director Chuck McBride, cinematographed by Lance Acord and produced by Tim Harman through New York production company cYclops in 2001. It features actor Judah Friedlander walking around hugging people (mostly in the band's hometown of Charlottesville, Virginia and Greenwich Village), including Conan O'Brien, Vincent Pastore, Sheryl Crow, Blue Man Group, Tiki Barber and Hallie Kate Eisenberg, as well as the band themselves. The video is a response to the general feeling immediately following the September 11th attacks.

== Live performances ==
The song has experienced consistent popularity as a live staple and has been played live every year since its release. As of 2018, it has been the most played live song from the Everyday album. When the song is played live, "#36" is mixed in with "Everyday". It is also a tradition for the crowd to sing, "Honey Honey come and dance with me" during the parts of the song that "#36" mixes in with. This can be heard on such CDs as The Best of What's Around Vol. 1, Live Trax Vol. 6, The Gorge, Live at Folsom Field, Boulder, Colorado, and on Weekend on the Rocks.

An acoustic version of "Everyday" was played live on February 28, 2001, by Dave Matthews and Trey Anastasio during the latter's solo performance at the Landmark Theatre in Richmond, Virginia. On September 21, 2001, Dave Matthews played an acoustic version of the song as part of the America: A Tribute to Heroes concert, performed in remembrance of the victims of the September 11 attacks.

== Charts ==
=== Weekly charts ===
Chart (2001–2002)	Peak position
US Bubbling Under Hot 100 (Billboard)	1
US Adult Alternative Airplay (Billboard)	1
US Adult Pop Airplay (Billboard)	8
US Alternative Airplay (Billboard)	38
US Pop Airplay (Billboard)	40

=== Year-end charts ===
Chart (2002)	Position
US Adult Top 40 (Billboard)	21
US Triple-A (Billboard)	8

=== All-time charts ===
Chart (1995–2021)	Position
US Adult Alternative Airplay (Billboard)	45

== Release history ==
Region	Date	Format(s)	Label(s)	Ref.
United States	October 15, 2001	Triple-A radio	RCA	
United States	October 16, 2001	Alternative radio	RCA	
United States	October 29, 2001	Hot adult contemporary radio	RCA	
United States	October 30, 2001	Contemporary hit radio	RCA	

== In popular culture ==
In its original form as "#36", the song was written in response to the assassination of Chris Hani, who worked to end South African apartheid. The 2006 "Free Hugs Campaign" video, which spawned the eponymous social movement, features an Australian man using the pseudonym Juan Mann offering unconditional hugs to strangers.
