= Greg Howard (musician) =

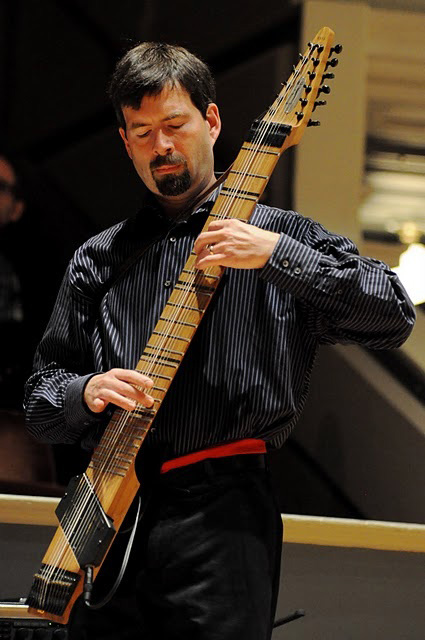

Background information
- Born: July 26, 1964; Washington, D.C.
- Died: April 22, 2023 (aged 58) Charlottesville, Virginia
- Genres: Pop, rock
- Occupations: Musician, composer, arranger, producer, author
- Instruments: Chapman Stick, keyboards, saxophone
- Website: www.greghoward.com

Greg Howard (July 26, 1964 – April 22, 2023) was a Chapman Stick player based in Charlottesville, Virginia. Howard played saxophone and keyboards in area bands before switching to the Stick in 1985. An early recording with guitarist Tim Reynolds was released on cassette in 1987 as Sticks and Stones.

Howard played with the Dave Matthews Band on two albums (Remember Two Things, 1993, and Before These Crowded Streets, 1998) and performed with the band in concert. He also collaborated with Dave Matthews Band saxophonist LeRoi Moore on various projects.

In 2000, the Greg Howard Band (with Dutch musicians Jan van Olffen, Jan Wolfkamp, and Hubert Heeringa) released an album, Lift.

Howard performed and led Chapman Stick seminars in North America and Europe. He has also written three method books: The Stick Book, Volume 1 (1997), and The Greg Howard Songbook (2009), and Tapping into Bach (2021) as well as an instructional DVD for the Stick, Basic Free Hands Technique, released in 2011.

== Discography ==
=== Studio releases ===
- Sticks and Stones: A Collection of Spontaneous Improvisations, 2001 (cassette 1987)

Collaboration with Tim Reynolds, electric guitar

- Stick Figures, 1993, remastered and re-released in 1999
- Shapes, 1994
- Code Magenta, 1995 with Dawn Thompson, vocals; LeRoi Moore, saxophone
- Sticks and Stones: Transmigration, 1996 with Tim Reynolds, guitar and other, remastered 2005.
- Sol, 1997 with Tim Reynolds, guitar; John D'earth, trumpet; others
- Water on the Moon, 1998
- Lift, 2000 with the Greg Howard Band
- Ether Ore, 2005
- AZUL, 2013 with John D'earth and Brian Caputo
- The Holly and the Ivy, 2017 with Angela Kelly

== Gear ==
=== Chapman Stick ===
- Rosewood 10-string (1995)
  - Standard SE Stickup
  - Baritone Melody/Standard Bass tuning
- Paduak 12-string (2000)
  - "The Block" pickup
  - Matched Reciprocal tuning

=== Rack ===
- Lexicon MPX-G2 (Stick melody)
- Rane SP-13 (pre-amp melody, mix all)
- TC Electronic Fireworx (Stick bass)
- Boss VF-1/Boss SE-70 (bass/melody)
- SWR SM-400 (preamp bass, power all)

=== Pedals ===
- Double switch for Fireworx
- Volume pedal for bass side (Fireworx)
- Lexicon MPX-R1
- Shape Shifter(TM) (MIDI pressure pad)
- Boss FC-50 MIDI control for SE-70
- Two on/off switches for SE-70
- Volume pedal for melody side (SE-70)
- Expression pedal for Fireworx

== Other ==
=== Method Books ===
- The Stick Book, Volume 1 (1997)
- The Greg Howard Songbook (2009)
- Tapping into Bach (2021)
