= Remember Two Things =

Live album by the Dave Matthews Band
- Released: November 9, 1993
- Venue: Trax (Charlottesville); Flood Zone (Richmond); The Muse (Nantucket)
- Studio: Flat Five (Salem)
- Genre: Rock
- Length: 60:27
- Label: Bama Rags
- Producer: John Alagía

The Dave Matthews Band chronology
Remember Two Things (1993)	Recently (1994)

Professional ratings
Review scores
Source	Rating
AllMusic	3/5 stars

Remember Two Things is the first full-length album release by the Dave Matthews Band. It was released independently through the band's own Bama Rags label on November 9, 1993. The album received wider release with a reissue by RCA Records on June 24, 1997, and was certified platinum by the RIAA in 2002. Consisting of live tracks interspersed with studio recordings, the album contains many songs that have remained setlist staples for the band.

== Overview ==
"The Song That Jane Likes" is named after Matthews' younger sister. In concert, he often prefaces the song by saying, "I've got a little sister named Jane. This is the song that Jane likes."

All songs are live recordings except for "Minarets" and "Seek Up" (and, on reissues, "Pay for What You Get" and "Typical Situation"), which were recorded in-studio. "I'll Back You Up" and "Christmas Song" are acoustic performances by Matthews and Tim Reynolds; all other songs feature the entire band. Matthews has been cited as saying that "I'll Back You Up" was recorded in a closet near a bathroom, and the version on the album is the one "with no flushing sounds in it."

"Ants Marching" and "Tripping Billies" were recorded at The Muse in Nantucket, Massachusetts, on August 17, 1993. "Recently" was recorded at The Flood Zone in Richmond, Virginia on August 10, 1993.

"Ants Marching" and "Satellite" later appeared on the 1994 album Under the Table and Dreaming, while "Tripping Billies" appeared on its 1996 follow-up, Crash.

== Packaging ==
The album cover art is an autostereogram that, when focused on correctly, shows a person's hand displaying a peace sign. It was created by two former UVA students in Charlottesville: Rick Kwiatkowski and Jeff Smith. The general consensus among Dave Matthews Band fan websites is that the two things referred to in the title are "love your mother" and "leave only footprints" as well as the two fingers displayed in the aforementioned cover.

== Track listing ==
All songs written by David J. Matthews, except "The Song That Jane Likes" written with Mark Roebuck.

Remember Two Things track listing
No.	Title	Length
1.	"Ants Marching"	6:02
2.	"Tripping Billies"	4:49
3.	"Recently"	8:42
4.	"Satellite"	5:01
5.	"One Sweet World"	5:18
6.	"The Song That Jane Likes"	3:33
7.	"Minarets"	4:22
8.	"Seek Up"	7:20
9.	"I'll Back You Up"	4:26
10.	"Christmas Song"	10:54
Total length:		60:27

Bonus tracks (2014 reissue)
No.	Title	Length
11.	"Pay for What You Get"	4:30
12.	"Typical Situation"	7:40
Total length:		72:37

Notes: "Ants Marching" includes an excerpt from "Dueling Banjos" (Arthur "Guitar Boogie" Smith).

Following "Christmas Song" is a hidden track with an outro to "Seek Up", followed by the ambient sounds of a thunderstorm and crickets.

== Personnel ==
Dave Matthews Band

- Carter Beauford – percussion, vocals
- Stefan Lessard – bass guitar
- David Matthews – guitar, vocals
- LeRoi Moore – woodwinds, vocals
- Boyd Tinsley – violin, vocals

Additional musicians

- Greg Howard – Chapman Stick, synthesizer, and percussion samples on "Minarets"
- Tim Reynolds – guitars on "Minarets", "Seek Up", "I'll Back You Up", and "Christmas Song"
