= Filament Productions =

American design company

- Founded: 2005
- Founder: Fenton Williams
- Headquarters: Charlottesville, Virginia
- Services: Production design & touring video
- Website: FilamentProd.com

Filament Productions is a production design and touring video company based in Charlottesville, Virginia, USA, since 2005. It was founded by Fenton Williams, who was the first road manager for the Dave Matthews Band ("DMB"). During the early 1990s, Williams realized he was not the best road manager and found his passion in designing sets and lighting at the DMB concerts. Filament Productions has since grown alongside the Dave Matthews Band, providing the band with video production, lighting and set design.

As of 2010, Filament Productions is one of the top production design and touring video companies in the industry because of its success with the Dave Matthews Band, which has been the third highest grossing touring band in the world and one of the highest attended touring bands in North America. Filament's list of clients now includes Tim McGraw, Zac Brown Band, Grateful Dead and Luke Bryan.

== Philanthropy ==
In 2009, Filament Productions donated a 3,000-square-foot (280 m^{2}) retail space on the Downtown Mall in Charlottesville, Virginia, to the Virginia Film Festival and also provided personnel to record the official trailer that played before every film. On June 22, 2010, Filament partnered with Nashville Rising, a benefit concert for Food Relief Victims in middle Tennessee headed by Faith Hill and Tim McGraw. Filament donated production design and touring video for the event which helped raise over $2 million. Over 19 different artists performed, including Miley Cyrus, Billy Ray Cyrus, Carrie Underwood, Blake Shelton, Jason Aldean, LeAnn Rimes, Luke Bryan, Michael W. Smith, Miranda Lambert, Taylor Swift, Toby Keith, Martina McBride, Amy Grant, Lynyrd Skynyrd, Blake Shelton, Julie Roberts and ZZ Top.

Filament also partnered Restore The Gulf's "Be The One" campaign for which Filament donated a production team to film Dave Matthews for his portion of the video. For the 2010 Virginia Film Festival, Filament produced the official trailer that played before every film, as well as the official commercial for the 2010 Festival.
