= Satellite (Dave Matthews Band song) =

Single by Dave Matthews Band

from the album Under the Table and Dreaming
- Released: 1995
- Recorded: Bearsville (Woodstock, New York)
- Genre: Rock
- Length: 4:51 (Album Version); 4:14 (Cold Radio Version); 4:22 (Fade Radio Version)
- Label: Bama Rags Records
- Songwriter: David J. Matthews

Dave Matthews Band singles chronology
| "Ants Marching" (1994) | "Satellite" (1995) | "Too Much" (1996) |

"Satellite" is a song by American rock group Dave Matthews Band. It was released in 1995 as the fifth and final single from their LP Under the Table and Dreaming (1994). It reached #18 on the Modern Rock Tracks chart. The song originally debuted on their 1993 album Remember Two Things. The guitar part for this song evolved from a finger exercise that Dave Matthews used to do. The cover art of the album features dishes of the Very Large Array in central New Mexico.

== Cover versions ==
- Mika has recorded a version of this song as the B-side for the vinyl copy of the single "Grace Kelly", as well as an acoustic version exclusive to the Best Buy edition of his album Life in Cartoon Motion.
- Josh Groban released his cover on the Deluxe Edition of his All That Echoes album, from 2013.

== Track listing ==
1. "Satellite" (Radio Version) (Cold) — 4:14
2. "Satellite" (Radio Version) (Fade) — 4:22
3. "Satellite" (Album Version) — 4:50
4. "Christmas Song" — 5:34

== Charts ==
| Chart (1995–96) | Peak position |
|---|---|
| US Billboard Hot 100 | 55 |
| US Billboard Pop Songs | 34 |
| US Billboard Alternative Songs | 18 |
| US Billboard Mainstream Rock | 36 |
