= Gravedigger (song) =

Single by Dave Matthews

from the album Some Devil
- Released: September 2003
- Genre: Rock
- Length: 3:53
- Label: RCA
- Songwriter: Dave J. Matthews
- Producer: Stephen Harris

Dave Matthews singles chronology
| "Gravedigger" (2003) | "Save Me" (2003) |

"Gravedigger" is a song by Dave Matthews from his debut solo album, Some Devil. This was the first solo single released by Matthews away from the Dave Matthews Band, and it won a Grammy Award for Best Male Rock Vocal Performance at the 46th Grammy Awards held in February 2004. The song has been performed live by Dave Matthews (solo), by Dave Matthews with Tim Reynolds, at Dave Matthews & Friends concerts, and occasionally as an acoustic solo by Matthews during Dave Matthews Band shows. During the Dave Matthews Band's tours in 2008 and 2009, it was played regularly by the full band.

Matthews said about the song:

"It's kind of these different stories that are brought together by walking through a graveyard with their names and the dates of their births and their deaths, and the stories that came out of their lives. It's sort of just telling those stories and some others as you wander through a graveyard and what you might think if you could walk into the graves and find out what people went through to get there."

There was also an acoustic version of the song on the album Some Devil. The song began as an intro played twice solo by Matthews at full-band DMB shows in the spring of 2002, before debuting as a full solo song in the same tour. In the original "Gravedigger Intro" version, only two people are mentioned: Merrill Lee (1905–1969) and Robert John Smith.

== Music video ==
A music video was produced for the song, directed by Mark Pellington. While filming the video in Montana, Matthews lost his wedding band in the grave, though it was eventually recovered.

== Track listing ==
1. "Gravedigger" — 3:50
2. "Gravedigger" (acoustic) — 3:53

== Chart performance ==
| Chart (2003) | Peak position |
|---|---|
| U.S. Billboard Adult Top 40 | 35 |
| U.S. Billboard Modern Rock Tracks | 35 |
