= The Space Between =

2001 single by Dave Matthews Band

- Artwork for German and Australian retail releases

Single by Dave Matthews Band

from the album Everyday
- Released: April 16, 2001
- Length: 4:02 (album version); 3:34 (radio edit)
- Label: RCA
- Songwriters: David J. Matthews; Glen Ballard
- Producer: Glen Ballard

Dave Matthews Band singles chronology
"I Did It" (2001)	"The Space Between" (2001)	"Everyday" (2001)

Audio
- "The Space Between" on YouTube

"The Space Between" is a song written by American rock band Dave Matthews Band from their fourth studio album, Everyday (2001). Released as a single in April 2001, it gave the band their first top-40 hit in their home country, peaking at number 22 on the US Billboard Hot 100 chart. In the United Kingdom, it became the band's only top-40 hit when it reached number 36 on the UK Singles Chart. "The Space Between" is also included on the Dave Matthews Band compilation album The Best of What's Around Vol. 1.

== Composition ==
The song was written by Dave Matthews and Glen Ballard. Ballard interpreted the lyrics as "an apology" to a loved one; "It’s telling the person who is most vivid in your life, whenever we’ve been apart, I want to make sure that we’re back together."

== Music video ==
The music video, directed by Dave Meyers, was filmed on Lake Pickett surrounded by CGI factories and power plants near Orlando, Florida. The video features Matthews and the band playing the song on the dock of the pond. It also features scenes depicting an old man in a boat, a mother walking through the pond while holding her baby, and a young couple sitting in the back of a pickup truck. As the video progresses, it begins to rain on the band and the unnamed characters; the band plays on, the old man removes rainwater from his boat with a cup, the mother shields her baby from the rain, and the young couple covers themselves with a blanket. In the final scene, the rain stops and Matthews is singing alone on the dock. A woman approaches, and Matthews walks off with her.

== Live performances ==
"The Space Between" was performed live on Saturday Night Live on February 24, 2001.

== Track listings ==
Australian single

1. "The Space Between" (remix) – 3:34
2. "The Space Between" – 4:02
3. "What You Are" – 4:33

UK CD1 single

1. "The Space Between" (album edit) – 4:02
2. "Fool to Think" – 4:13
3. "The Space Between" (video) – 3:38

UK CD2 single

1. "The Space Between" (radio edit) – 3:34
2. "What You Are" – 3:48
3. "I Did It" (video) – 3:38

== Charts ==
=== Weekly charts ===
Weekly chart performance for "The Space Between"
Chart (2001–2002)	Peak position
Australia (ARIA)	97
Netherlands (Dutch Top 40 Tipparade)	3
Netherlands (Single Top 100)	69
Scotland Singles (Official Charts)	25
UK Singles (Official Charts)	35
US Billboard Hot 100	22
US Adult Alternative Airplay (Billboard)	1
US Adult Pop Airplay (Billboard)	4
US Alternative Airplay (Billboard)	10
US Pop Airplay (Billboard)	18

=== Year-end charts ===
2001 year-end chart performance for "The Space Between"
Chart (2001)	Position
Canada Radio (Nielsen BDS)	100
US Billboard Hot 100	65
US Adult Top 40 (Billboard)	9
US Mainstream Top 40 (Billboard)	66
US Modern Rock Tracks (Billboard)	32
US Triple-A (Billboard)	3

2002 year-end chart performance for "The Space Between"
Chart (2002)	Position
US Adult Top 40 (Billboard)	45

== Release history ==
Release dates and formats for "The Space Between"
Region	Date	Format(s)	Label(s)	Ref.
United States	April 16, 2001	Adult alternative radio	RCA	
United States	April 17, 2001	Alternative radio	RCA	
United States	June 5, 2001	Contemporary hit radio	RCA	
Australia	September 3, 2001	CD	RCA; BMG	
United Kingdom	November 19, 2001	CD	RCA; BMG	
