= Everyday (Dave Matthews Band album) =

Studio album by Dave Matthews Band
- Released: February 27, 2001
- Recorded: October 9 – December 1, 2000
- Studio: Conway (Hollywood)
- Genres: Alternative rock; jazz fusion; soft rock; pop rock
- Length: 51:00
- Label: RCA
- Producer: Glen Ballard

Dave Matthews Band chronology
Listener Supported (1999)	Everyday (2001)	The Videos 1994–2001 (2001)

Singles from Everyday
- 1. "I Did It" Released: January 3, 2001; 2. "The Space Between" Released: April 16, 2001; 3. "Everyday" Released: November 15, 2001

Everyday is the fourth studio album by the American rock band Dave Matthews Band. It was released on February 27, 2001, through RCA Records. It is the band's first album to be produced by Glen Ballard, who also co-wrote all twelve of the album's songs with guitarist and vocalist Dave Matthews. The album marked a shift in the band's sound, prominently featuring electric guitar and concise pop arrangements.

Everyday was a commercial success, becoming the band's second number one album in the US. Three singles were released ("I Did It", "The Space Between", and "Everyday"), with "The Space Between" becoming the band's first top 40 hit in the US. Reviews were mixed; some critics disliked the band's change in sound while others welcomed the more accessible material.

== Background ==
In the summer of 2000, the band began sessions with longtime producer Steve Lillywhite for a new album. However, the dark nature of the recordings combined with a feeling of stagnation by the band members led to the sessions being abandoned. Matthews instead flew to Los Angeles to meet with Ballard with the intention of finishing the new material. Instead, Matthews and Ballard began a productive writing partnership that resulted in an album's worth of new songs in less than two weeks. This material ended up being included on Everyday instead, while most of the songs originally recorded with Lillywhite were re-recorded for Busted Stuff in 2002.

== Release and reception ==
=== Critical reception ===
Professional ratings
Aggregate scores
Source	Rating
Metacritic	67/100
Review scores
Source	Rating
AllMusic	2.5/5 stars
E!	C+
Entertainment Weekly	C+
Los Angeles Times	3/4 stars
Now	4/5 stars
Rolling Stone	3.5/5 stars
The Rolling Stone Album Guide	3/5 stars
Slant Magazine	2/5 stars
Spin	5/10
USA Today	3/4 stars

Everyday received generally positive reviews from music critics. At Metacritic, which assigns a normalized rating out of 100 to reviews from mainstream critics, the album received an average score of 67, based on 16 reviews, which indicates "generally favorable reviews".

=== Commercial performance ===
Everyday became the band's second album in a row to top the Billboard 200. The album has since been certified 3× platinum by the Recording Industry Association of America for sales exceeding 3,000,000 copies. It also became the band's first number one album in Canada.

"I Did It", the album's lead single, peaked at number 71 on the Billboard Hot 100. The song was more successful on the Adult Alternative Airplay chart, where it peaked at number one for a week. The album's second single, "The Space Between", became the band's first top 40 hit in the United States, peaking at number 22. Like its predecessor, it also topped the Triple A chart for a week. The title track was released as the album's final single; despite failing to chart on the Hot 100, it topped the Triple A chart for eight weeks, the band's longest stay at the top of the chart until it was surpassed by "Funny the Way It Is" in 2009.

== Track listing ==
All tracks are written by David J. Matthews and Glen Ballard.

No.	Title	Length
1.	"I Did It"	3:35
2.	"When the World Ends"	3:31
3.	"The Space Between"	4:03
4.	"Dreams of Our Fathers"	4:41
5.	"So Right"	4:41
6.	"If I Had It All"	4:03
7.	"What You Are"	4:33
8.	"Angel"	3:58
9.	"Fool to Think"	4:14
10.	"Sleep to Dream Her"	4:25
11.	"Mother Father"	4:24
12.	"Everyday"	4:43

== Personnel ==
Dave Matthews Band

- Carter Beauford – bongos, conga, drums, background vocals, vibraphone
- Stefan Lessard – bass guitar
- Dave Matthews – acoustic guitar, electric guitar, vocals, baritone guitar
- LeRoi Moore – flute, contrabass clarinet, alto saxophone, tenor saxophone, background vocals
- Boyd Tinsley – violin, background vocals

Additional personnel

- Glen Ballard – keyboards, piano
- Carlos Santana – electric guitar on "Mother Father"
- Karl Perrazo – percussion on "Mother Father"
- Vusi Mahlasela – background vocals on "Everyday"

Technical

- Glen Ballard – producer
- Karl Derfler – recording engineer, digital editing
- Scott Campbell – digital editing, additional engineering
- John Nelson – assistant engineer
- Chris Lord-Alge – mixing engineer
- Matt Silva – mixing assistant
- Bob Ludwig – mastering engineer
- Jolie Levine-Aller – production coordinator
- Rachel Cleverley – production assistant
- Thane Kerner – art direction, design
- Catherine Dee – design assistant
- Danny Clinch – cover photography
- Dan Winters – interior photography

== Charts ==
=== Weekly charts ===
Weekly chart performance for Everyday
Chart (2001–2002)	Peak position
Australian Albums (ARIA)	71
Canadian Albums (Billboard)	1
Danish Albums (Hitlisten)	31
German Albums (Offizielle Top 100)	97
Italian Albums (FIMI)	33
New Zealand Albums (RMNZ)	30
Swedish Albums (Sverigetopplistan)	58
UK Albums (Official Charts)	89
US Billboard 200	1

=== Year-end charts ===
Year-end chart performance for Everyday
Chart (2001)	Position
Canadian Albums (Nielsen SoundScan)	42
US Billboard 200	20
Worldwide Albums (IFPI)	26
Chart (2002)	Position
Canadian Albums (Nielsen SoundScan)	176
Canadian Alternative Albums (Nielsen SoundScan)	56
US Billboard 200	134

=== Decade-end charts ===
Chart (2000–2009)	Position
US Billboard 200	96

== Certifications ==
Region	Certification	Certified units/sales
Canada (Music Canada)	Platinum	100,000^{^}
United States (RIAA)	3× Platinum	3,000,000^{^}
United Kingdom (BPI)	Silver	60,000^{^}
^{^} Shipments figures based on certification alone.
