= Where Are You Going =

2002 single by Dave Matthews Band

Single by Dave Matthews Band

from the album Busted Stuff
- Released: May 20, 2002
- Length: 3:52 (album version); 3:46 (radio edit)
- Label: RCA
- Songwriter: Dave Matthews
- Producer: Stephen Harris

Dave Matthews Band singles chronology
"Everyday" (2001)	"Where Are You Going" (2002)	"Grace Is Gone" (2002)

"Where Are You Going" is a song by American rock band Dave Matthews Band, released as the first single from their fifth studio album, Busted Stuff (2002). The single reached number 39 on the US Billboard Hot 100 and number 20 on the Billboard Modern Rock Tracks chart. On the Billboard Triple-A chart, it became the band's fourth consecutive number-one hit as well as their seventh overall.

== Charts ==
=== Weekly charts ===
Chart (2002)	Peak position
US Billboard Hot 100	39
US Adult Alternative Airplay (Billboard)	1
US Adult Pop Airplay (Billboard)	3
US Alternative Airplay (Billboard)	20
US Pop Airplay (Billboard)	33

=== Year-end charts ===
Chart (2002)	Position
US Adult Top 40 (Billboard)	15
US Modern Rock Tracks (Billboard)	68
US Triple-A (Billboard)	3

Chart (2003)	Position
US Adult Top 40 (Billboard)	38
