= Grey Street (song) =

2002 single by Dave Matthews Band

Single by Dave Matthews Band

from the album Busted Stuff
- Released: November 11, 2002
- Length: 5:08 (album version); 4:28 (rock remix)
- Label: RCA
- Songwriter: Dave Matthews
- Producer: Stephen Harris

Dave Matthews Band singles chronology
"Grace Is Gone" (2002)	"Grey Street" (2002)	"American Baby" (2005)

"Grey Street" is the third and final single from American rock band Dave Matthews Band's fifth studio album, Busted Stuff (2002). The first known recording of the song appears on the unofficially-released The Lillywhite Sessions, produced by Steve Lillywhite. The song revolves around the story of a girl who is consumed with feelings of loneliness, boredom and powerlessness. Color—and the lack thereof—are motifs in the song.

== Track listing ==
1. "Grey Street" (rock remix) – 4:28
2. "Grey Street" (album version) – 5:06

== Charts ==
=== Weekly charts ===
Chart (2002–2003)	Peak position
US Bubbling Under Hot 100 (Billboard)	19
US Adult Alternative Airplay (Billboard)	5
US Adult Pop Airplay (Billboard)	18
US Alternative Airplay (Billboard)	33

=== Year-end charts ===
Chart (2003)	Position
US Adult Top 40 (Billboard)	50
US Triple-A (Billboard)	33
