= I Did It (Dave Matthews Band song) =

2001 single by Dave Matthews Band

Single by Dave Matthews Band

from the album Everyday
- Released: January 9, 2001
- Length: 3:36 (album version); 3:16 (UK radio edit)
- Label: RCA
- Songwriters: Glen Ballard; Dave Matthews
- Producer: Glen Ballard

Dave Matthews Band singles chronology
"Rapunzel" (1999)	"I Did It" (2001)	"The Space Between" (2001)

Music video
- "I Did It" on YouTube

"I Did It" is a song by American rock band Dave Matthews Band, released as the lead single from their fourth studio album, Everyday (2001). The song reached number 71 on the US Billboard Hot 100, number five on Billboard Modern Rock Tracks, and number one on the Billboard Triple A chart, giving the band their fourth number one on that chart.

In January 2001, Dave Matthews Band made history by becoming the first major artist to release a single directly to Napster, posting "I Did It" on the controversial file-swapping service six weeks before the new album was officially released.

== Music video ==
The music video for "I Did It", directed by Dave Myers, was filmed in Miami and premiered on VH1, MTV, and MTV2 on February 15, 2001.

== Track listings ==
Australian single

1. "I Did It" – 3:36
2. "I Did It" (UK edit) – 3:16
3. "Fool to Think" – 4:13
4. "Crush" (live) – 10:34

European single

1. "I Did It" (US radio edit) – 3:38
2. "I Did It" (UK radio edit) – 3:16
3. CD-ROM video

== Charts ==
=== Weekly charts ===
Chart (2001)	Peak position
US Billboard Hot 100	71
US Adult Alternative Airplay (Billboard)	1
US Adult Pop Airplay (Billboard)	20
US Alternative Airplay (Billboard)	5
US Mainstream Rock Airplay (Billboard)	23

=== Year-end charts ===
Chart (2001)	Position
US Adult Top 40 (Billboard)	58
US Modern Rock Tracks (Billboard)	41
US Triple-A (Billboard)	16

== Release history ==
Region	Date	Format(s)	Label(s)	Ref.
United States	January 9, 2001	Active rock radio	RCA	
Australia	April 30, 2001	CD	RCA; BMG	
