= Busted Stuff =

Studio album by Dave Matthews Band
- Released: July 16, 2002
- Studio: Record Plant (Sausalito, California)
- Genre: Jazz rock
- Length: 54:36
- Label: RCA
- Producer: Stephen Harris

Dave Matthews Band chronology
Live in Chicago 12.19.98 at the United Center (2001)	Busted Stuff (2002)	Live at Folsom Field, Boulder, Colorado (2002)

Singles from Busted Stuff
- 1. "Where Are You Going" Released: May 20, 2002; 2. "Grace Is Gone" Released: August 26, 2002; 3. "Grey Street" Released: November 11, 2002

Busted Stuff is the fifth studio album by the American rock band Dave Matthews Band. It was released on July 16, 2002, through RCA Records. Much of the album's material was first recorded in 2000 during sessions with longtime producer Steve Lillywhite which were later scrapped. After the release of the Glen Ballard–produced Everyday in 2001, the band returned to the material, re-recording it with producer Stephen Harris.

Busted Stuff was a critical and commercial success. It became the band's third straight number-one album in the U.S., and also topped the chart in Canada. "Where Are You Going", "Grace Is Gone" and "Grey Street" were released as singles; the former peaked at number 39 on the Billboard Hot 100. Reviews were positive, with many celebrating the return to the band's classic style after the more commercial sound of Everyday.

== Background ==
In the summer of 2000, the band worked with Lillywhite in Charlottesville, Virginia, on twelve new tracks. However, due to trepidation from band members and the label over the dark nature of the recordings, the direction of the project shifted and the band started a collaboration with Ballard. While the band originally intended to complete the already-written songs with Ballard, a nine-day songwriting session between lead vocalist and guitarist Dave Matthews and Ballard yielded new material that would be included on the much more upbeat Everyday instead. Matthews felt that the environment in which the songs were recorded contributed to the dour atmosphere, describing the material as "sad bastard songs". Additionally, a period of increased drinking for Matthews further emphasized the dark tone of the sessions and the material. The band felt stagnant during these sessions, with violinist Boyd Tinsley later stating: "The Lillywhite sessions should’ve worked, but they didn’t, and who knows why? It just became a really hard and arduous process after a while. It felt like we weren’t going anywhere." These recordings would be leaked in March 2001 through the internet and are commonly referred to as The Lillywhite Sessions. The band were displeased by the leaking of the material, with Matthews comparing it to "a painter finding his painting for sale in a gallery before he’s finished it. It was a huge violation."

After the release of Everyday, the band returned to the studio to re-record the material from the 2000 sessions, now with Harris producing. Alongside the older material, two newer songs, "Where Are You Going" and "You Never Know" were recorded and included on the album, while three songs from The Lillywhite Sessions, "Sweet Up and Down", "JTR", and "Monkey Man", were excluded. The final versions of the Lillywhite songs are generally considered to be less dark and more polished in comparison to their 2000 counterparts. Some tracks, such as "Grey Street" featured new lyrics, while others were presented in different arrangements or included new sections. "Bartender", already a concert staple, appears in shortened form on the album, being cut from ten to eight minutes.

== Music and lyrics ==
Much of Busted Stuff combines elements of rock and jazz music. In comparison to the much more pop-oriented sound of Everyday, the album harkens back to the band's familiar sound. Rolling Stone described the album's aesthetic as falling in between the "darker folk introspection" of the sessions with Lillywhite and the "pop" approach of Everyday.

The album opens with the jazz-influenced title track, which PopMatters described as lyrically revolving around "the trail of indignities left behind following the breakdown of a relationship." "You Never Know" makes use of shifting, complex time signatures. Despite featuring lyrics in earlier versions, "Kit Kat Jam" appears on the album as an instrumental. Matthews has described the album's closing track, "Bartender", as "one of the best songs he's ever written." Lyrically, the song covers a man's impending death and a look back at the meaning of one's life.

== Commercial performance ==
Busted Stuff was a commercial success, becoming the band's third straight number-one album in the U.S., where the album sold over 621,700 copies in its first week of release. The album also topped the chart in Canada, with first-week sales exceeding 21,700 copies. The album would later be certified 2× platinum.

While not spawning any commercial single releases, "Where Are You Going" was shipped to radio on May 20, 2002. "Grace Is Gone" and "Grey Street" followed as singles on August 26 and November 11, respectively. "Where Are You Going" became the band's second top 40 hit in the U.S., peaking at number 39. It also reached the top of the Billboard Triple-A chart, giving them their seventh Triple-A chart-topper. The song would also be featured on the soundtrack to the 2002 comedy film Mr. Deeds. The second single, "Grace Is Gone", then reached a peak of number four on the Triple-A chart. Finally, "Grey Street" "bubbled under" the Hot 100, charting at number 119. Like the other singles, it was successful on alternative adult radio, reaching number five on the Triple-A chart.

== Critical reception ==
Professional ratings
Aggregate scores
Source	Rating
Metacritic	78/100
Review scores
Source	Rating
AllMusic	4.5/5 stars
Blender	3/5 stars
E!	A−
Entertainment Weekly	A−
Los Angeles Times	2.5/4 stars
Q	3/5 stars
Rolling Stone	3/5 stars
The Rolling Stone Album Guide	4/5 stars
Spin	7/10
USA Today	3/4 stars

Busted Stuff received generally positive reviews from music critics. At Metacritic, which assigns a normalized rating out of 100 to reviews from mainstream critics, the album received an average score of 78, based on 11 reviews, which indicates "generally favorable reviews". Many publications declaring it the band's best album yet. Spin highlighted the contrast between the dark lyrical content and upbeat arrangements and compared it to the Grateful Dead's Workingman's Dead (1970) as "a record that celebrates the solace and pleasure of community in the face of loneliness and impending doom". Rolling Stone praised the simplified arrangements of some tracks, stating that "[the album] suggests a new lesson is starting to take hold: Sometimes simplicity is the best route to the heart of the song." The review listed "Grace is Gone" and "Digging a Ditch" as highlights, praising the former's evocation of "the haunted air of a classic country murder ballad" and the latter's "hymnlike glow".

USA Today awarded the album three stars out of four and stated that the recordings on the album "brighten the mood and tighten the arrangements" of the songs in comparison to the versions recorded with Lillywhite. Blender also felt the new recordings surpassed those from The Lillywhite Sessions, calling them "less tentative, with springier grooves and more polished yet still intimate vocals." The A.V. Club described the finished songs as "shorter and tighter", and felt that the "gloss[ed] up" sound did not compromise the album's "soul-searching introspection". Entertainment Weekly similarly praised the band's new interpretations of the songs in comparison to their Lillywhite counterparts, saying the album is "such a fascinatingly different take on (mostly) the same material that it almost whets your appetite for a third rendering." The magazine also highlighted the increased presence of saxophonist LeRoi Moore in comparison to on Everyday. In a retrospective review for AllMusic, Stephen Thomas Erlewine called Busted Stuff "unquestionably the best album of their [the band]'s career", praising the songs' "heartbreak and yearning" as "palpably real".

Slant considered Busted Stuff a step back from the band's first three albums, but also a vast improvement over Everyday. While the magazine lamented the exclusion of "Sweet Up and Down" and "JTR", which they declared "the catchiest tunes from The Lillywhite Sessions", and found Matthews' vocals on the title track to be "less playful" than on the earlier version, they found that the album as a whole "stretches Matthews thematically and vocally far beyond anything" from the album's predecessor. The review compared "Grey Street" to "the ardent U2 of yesteryear", while considering the album overall to be "relatively demure" while "its themes are dark and its parables profound".

The nine songs originally from the sessions with Lillywhite appeared on Ryley Walker's cover of The Lillywhite Sessions in 2018.

== Track listing ==
All lyrics are written by David J. Matthews; all music is composed by Dave Matthews Band.

Busted Stuff
No.	Title	Length
1.	"Busted Stuff"	3:48
2.	"Grey Street"	5:08
3.	"Where Are You Going"	3:53
4.	"You Never Know"	5:54
5.	"Captain"	3:46
6.	"Raven"	5:38
7.	"Grace Is Gone"	4:38
8.	"Kit Kat Jam"	3:35
9.	"Digging a Ditch"	4:47
10.	"Big Eyed Fish"	5:04
11.	"Bartender"	8:32
Total length:		54:36

== Personnel ==
Dave Matthews Band:

- Carter Beauford – drums
- Stefan Lessard – bass guitar, Dobro, piano, Hammond organ
- Dave Matthews – acoustic and electric guitars, lead vocals
- LeRoi Moore – saxophone, penny whistle, flute
- Boyd Tinsley – electric violin

Production personnel:

- Stephen Harris – producer
- John Alagía – mixing
- John Nelson – engineering
- Leff Lefferts, Enrique Müller – second engineers
- Jared Miller – assistant second engineer
- Ted Jensen – mastering
- Jonathan Adler – assistant editor (track 8)
- Henry Luniewski – drum technician
- Robert Montgomery – guitar technician
- Erik Porter – bass & violin technician
- David Saull – horn technician

Artwork:

- David J. Matthews – art direction, design
- Thane Kerner – art direction, design, digital collage portrait
- Danny Clinch – art direction, design, photography
- Catherine Dee – art direction, design
- Gary Ashley, Hannah Connors – photography assistance

== Charts and certifications ==
=== Weekly charts ===
Weekly chart performance for Busted Stuff
Chart (2002)	Peak position
Canadian Albums (Billboard)	1
US Billboard 200	1

=== Year-end charts ===
Year-end chart performance for Busted Stuff
Chart (2002)	Position
Canadian Albums (Nielsen SoundScan)	78
Canadian Alternative Albums (Nielsen SoundScan)	23
US Billboard 200	37

=== Certifications ===
Region	Certification	Certified units/sales
United States (RIAA)	2× Platinum	2,000,000^{^}
^{^} Shipments figures based on certification alone.
