= Ants Marching =

Single by Dave Matthews Band

from the album Under the Table and Dreaming
- Released: September 1995
- Recorded: 1994
- Studio: Bearsville (Woodstock, New York)
- Genre: Alternative rock
- Length: 4:31
- Label: Bama Rags Records
- Songwriter: David J. Matthews
- Producer: Steve Lillywhite

Dave Matthews Band singles chronology
"Typical Situation" (1994)	"Ants Marching" (1995)	"Satellite" (1995)

"Ants Marching" is a song by American rock group Dave Matthews Band. It was released in September 1995 as the second single from their debut studio album, Under the Table and Dreaming (1994). It reached #18 on the US Billboard Alternative chart and on the Mainstream Rock chart as well. The song was considered a successful hit single. A different recording of it was included on their prior album Remember Two Things (1993). This version was slightly longer, clocking in at 6:08. Dave Matthews wrote the music and lyrics in 1991.

== Track listings ==
=== US CD single ===
1. "Ants Marching" (Album Version) – 4:31
2. "Ants Marching" (Live Version) – 4:45
3. "Ants Marching" (Live Acoustic Version) – 4:19

=== Australia CD single 1 ===
1. "Ants Marching" (Album Version) – 4:31
2. "Ants Marching" (Live Version) – 4:45
3. "Ants Marching" (Live Acoustic Version) – 4:19
4. "All Along the Watchtower" – 7:04

=== Australia CD single 2 ===
1. "Ants Marching" (Album Version) – 4:31
2. "What Would You Say" – 3:41
3. "Typical Situation" (Edit) – 3:57
4. "Ants Marching" (Live Version) – 4:45

== Charts ==
Chart (1995-1996)	Peak position
Canada Top Singles (RPM)	30
US Adult Contemporary (Billboard)	25
US Adult Pop Airplay (Billboard)	22
US Alternative Airplay (Billboard)	18
US Pop Airplay (Billboard)	19
US Radio Songs (Billboard)	21
US Cash Box Top 100	49
