= Crash (Dave Matthews Band album) =

Studio album by Dave Matthews Band
- Released: April 30, 1996
- Recorded: October 1995 – January 1996
- Studios: Bearsville (Woodstock, New York)
- Genres: Folk rock; soft rock; alternative rock
- Length: 68:51
- Label: RCA
- Producer: Steve Lillywhite

Dave Matthews Band chronology
Under the Table and Dreaming (1994)	Crash (1996)	Live at Red Rocks 8.15.95 (1997)

Singles from Crash
- 1. "Too Much" Released: April 1996; 2. "So Much to Say" Released: August 1996; 3. "Crash into Me" Released: October 29, 1996

Crash is the second studio album by the American rock band Dave Matthews Band, released on April 30, 1996 by RCA Records.

By March 16, 2000, the album had sold seven million copies, and was certified septuple platinum by the Recording Industry Association of America. Crash is currently Dave Matthews Band's best-selling album.

== Recording ==
Recording of the album began in October 1995, and ended in January 1996. There were only four known songs from the Crash sessions that "didn't make it to the final cut." However, none of the titles are known.

== Critical reception ==
Professional ratings
Review scores
Source	Rating
AllMusic	3.5/5 stars
Entertainment Weekly	B+
Houston Chronicle	3/5 stars
Los Angeles Times	2.5/4 stars
The Philadelphia Inquirer	3/4 stars
Pitchfork	7.5/10
Q	4/5 stars
The Rolling Stone Album Guide	4/5 stars
Spin	5/10
USA Today	3/4 stars

Q described Crash as "equal parts originality and willful complication", and stated, "Although the band's determinedly jammy methods do lead them away from their songs at times, almost every track of Crash is at least 'good in parts'". Entertainment Weekly's Tom Sinclair praised the band's technical abilities, concluding that "one of the nicest things about DMB's music is that its distinctive complexity serves as a virtual assurance against a flood of lame imitator bands."

Stephen Thomas Erlewine of AllMusic gave a more mixed assessment, stating that while the band continued to get better, the songs themselves lacked memorable hooks, ultimately concluding that "Crash is an album that will please fans, but not novices." Jim DeRogatis of Rolling Stone was unfavorable, deeming Matthews' vocals "too much like Sting's at times" and his lyrics "typically banal", while remarking that the album's musical eclecticism "gives Matthews a slight edge over his peers, but that's sort of like saying you prefer vanilla ice cream to vanilla frozen yogurt." Robert Christgau of The Village Voice evaluated Crash as a "dud".

== Track listing ==
Crash
No.	Title	Writer(s)	Length
1.	"So Much to Say"	David J. Matthews; Boyd Tinsley; Peter Griesar	4:06
2.	"Two Step"	Matthews	6:27
3.	"Crash into Me"	Matthews	5:16
4.	"Too Much"	Carter Beauford; Stefan Lessard; Matthews; LeRoi Moore; Tinsley	4:22
5.	"#41"	Beauford; Lessard; Matthews; Moore; Tinsley	6:39
6.	"Say Goodbye"	Matthews	6:12
7.	"Drive In, Drive Out"	Matthews	5:55
8.	"Let You Down"	Lessard; Matthews	4:07
9.	"Lie in Our Graves"	Beauford; Lessard; Matthews; Moore; Tinsley	5:42
10.	"Cry Freedom"	Matthews	5:54
11.	"Tripping Billies"	Matthews	5:00
12.	"Proudest Monkey"	Beauford; Lessard; Matthews; Moore; Tinsley	9:11
Total length:			68:51

== Personnel ==
Dave Matthews Band

- Carter Beauford – drums, percussion, backing vocals (1, 7, 10, 11, 12)
- Stefan Lessard – bass, tack piano
- Dave Matthews – vocals, acoustic guitar, design assistant
- LeRoi Moore – saxophones, flute, whistles
- Boyd Tinsley – acoustic and electric violins

Additional musicians

- Tim Reynolds – acoustic and electric guitars

Technical personnel

- Steve Lillywhite – production, mixing engineer (3, 5, 6, 8, 10, 12)
- John Siket – engineer
- Chris Laidlaw – 1st assistant engineer
- Scott Gormley – 1st assistant engineer
- Paul Higgins – 2nd assistant engineer
- Phil Painson – additional recording assistant
- Tom Lord-Alge – mixing engineer (1, 2, 4, 7, 9, 11)
- Alex Case – mixing assistant (1, 2, 4, 7, 9, 11)
- John Alagía – additional preproduction
- Ted Jensen – mastering engineer
- Thane Kerner – art direction, design, illustrations
- Jane Matthews – design assistant
- C. Taylor Crothers – Band photography

== Charts ==
=== Weekly charts ===
Chart (1996)	Peak position
Canadian Albums (RPM)	25
New Zealand Albums (RMNZ)	37
US Billboard 200	2

=== Year-end charts ===
Chart (1996)	Position
US Billboard 200	26
Chart (1997)	Position
US Billboard 200	29

Chart (2002)	Position
Canadian Alternative Albums (Nielsen SoundScan)	100

== Certifications ==
Region	Certification	Certified units/sales
Canada (Music Canada)	Platinum	100,000^{^}
United States (RIAA)	7× Platinum	7,000,000^{^}
^{^} Shipments figures based on certification alone.
