= Under the Table and Dreaming =

Studio album by Dave Matthews Band
- Released: September 27, 1994
- Recorded: May 1994
- Studios: Bearsville (Woodstock, New York)
- Genres: Folk jazz; jazz rock; funk rock; afropop; pop rock
- Length: 62:52
- Label: RCA
- Producer: Steve Lillywhite

Dave Matthews Band chronology
Recently (1994)	Under the Table and Dreaming (1994)	Crash (1996)

Singles from Under the Table and Dreaming
- 1. "What Would You Say" Released: September 1994; 2. "Ants Marching" Released: September 1995; 3. "Satellite" Released: November 1995

Under the Table and Dreaming is the debut studio album by the American rock band Dave Matthews Band, released on September 27, 1994. The album's first single was "What Would You Say", featuring John Popper of Blues Traveler on harmonica. Four other singles from the album followed: "Jimi Thing", "Typical Situation", "Ants Marching", and "Satellite". By March 16, 2000, the album had sold six million copies, and was certified six times platinum by the RIAA.

== Recording ==
The acoustic guitar tracks on the album were played by Dave Matthews and Tim Reynolds. During the recording sessions, Matthews and Reynolds would sit face-to-face with a piece of glass between them, playing the same guitar part. This was done twice for each song to yield a total of four acoustic guitar tracks, two apiece from Matthews and Reynolds. Producer Steve Lillywhite frequently turned the volume down on Matthews' parts and turned the volume up on Reynolds', resulting in Reynolds' guitar playing being more prominent on the final album. Reynolds then overdubbed additional acoustic and electric guitar parts.

"Granny" was recorded for this release and Matthews wanted this to be the band's first single, but the song never made it to any of the studio albums. A studio version of this track is included on the 2014 reissue of the album.

The album was dedicated to Matthews' older sister Anne, who was killed by her husband in 1994 in a murder–suicide. Included in the jewel case packet is a picture of Dave Matthews and one of Anne's children.

== Critical reception ==
Professional ratings
Review scores
Source	Rating
AllMusic	4.5/5 stars
The Encyclopedia of Popular Music	4/5 stars
Entertainment Weekly	C+
The Philadelphia Inquirer	4/4 stars
The Rolling Stone Album Guide	3.5/5 stars
The Village Voice	C+

Stereo Review noted that "Matthews is a lucid dreamer and idealist whose folk-jazz forays call to mind Bruce Cockburn, another square peg who wins fans with a combination of artistry and perseverance." The Baltimore Sun determined that "the band has a great sense of groove, evincing all the rhythmic discipline of a jazz band without ever losing its sense of the song."

== Track listing ==
All tracks are written by David J. Matthews, except "#34" by Matthews, LeRoi Moore, Carter Beauford and Haines Fullerton.

Under the Table and Dreaming track listing
No.	Title	Length
1.	"The Best of What's Around"	4:17
2.	"What Would You Say"	3:43
3.	"Satellite"	4:52
4.	"Rhyme & Reason"	5:16
5.	"Typical Situation"	5:59
6.	"Dancing Nancies"	6:08
7.	"Ants Marching"	4:31
8.	"Lover Lay Down"	5:38
9.	"Jimi Thing"	5:57
10.	"Warehouse"	7:06
11.	"Pay for What You Get"	4:35
12.	"#34"	4:58

20th anniversary edition bonus tracks
No.	Title	Length
13.	"Granny"	3:56
14.	"Dancing Nancies" (Acoustic)	4:13
15.	"The Song That Jane Likes" (Acoustic)	2:56

Note: Original CD editions of the album include 22 tracks of silence between "Pay for What You Get" and "#34".

== Personnel ==
Dave Matthews Band

- Carter Beauford – drums, percussion, vocals
- Stefan Lessard – bass guitar
- Dave Matthews – vocals, acoustic guitar, design assistant
- LeRoi Moore – alto, soprano, and tenor saxophone; vocals; flute
- Boyd Tinsley – acoustic violin, vocals

Additional musicians

- Tim Reynolds – acoustic guitar
- John Popper – harmonica on "What Would You Say"
- John Alagía, Michael McDonald, Andrew Page, Jeff Thomas – additional vocals on "Dancing Nancies" and "What Would You Say"
- Steve Forman – additional percussion on "Typical Situation"

Technical personnel

- Steve Lillywhite – producer
- Chris Dickie – engineer
- Andrew Page – assistant engineer
- Tom Lord-Alge – mixing engineer
- Rory Romano – mixing assistant
- Dave Betancourt – mixing assistant
- Ted Jensen – mastering
- Thane Kerner – art direction, design
- Stuart Dee – photography
- Sam Erickson, Christopher Bunn, Will Kerner, Taylor Crothers – additional photography

== Charts ==
=== Weekly charts ===
Chart (1994–1995)	Peak position
US Billboard 200	11

=== Year-end charts ===
Chart (1995)	Position
US Billboard 200	25
Chart (1996)	Position
US Billboard 200	54
Chart (2002)	Position
Canadian Alternative Albums (Nielsen SoundScan)	188

== Certifications ==
Region	Certification	Certified units/sales
Canada (Music Canada)	Platinum	100,000^{‡}
United States (RIAA)	6× Platinum	6,000,000^{^}
^{^} Shipments figures based on certification alone.^{‡} Sales+streaming figures based on certification alone.
