= Jennifer Hudson discography =

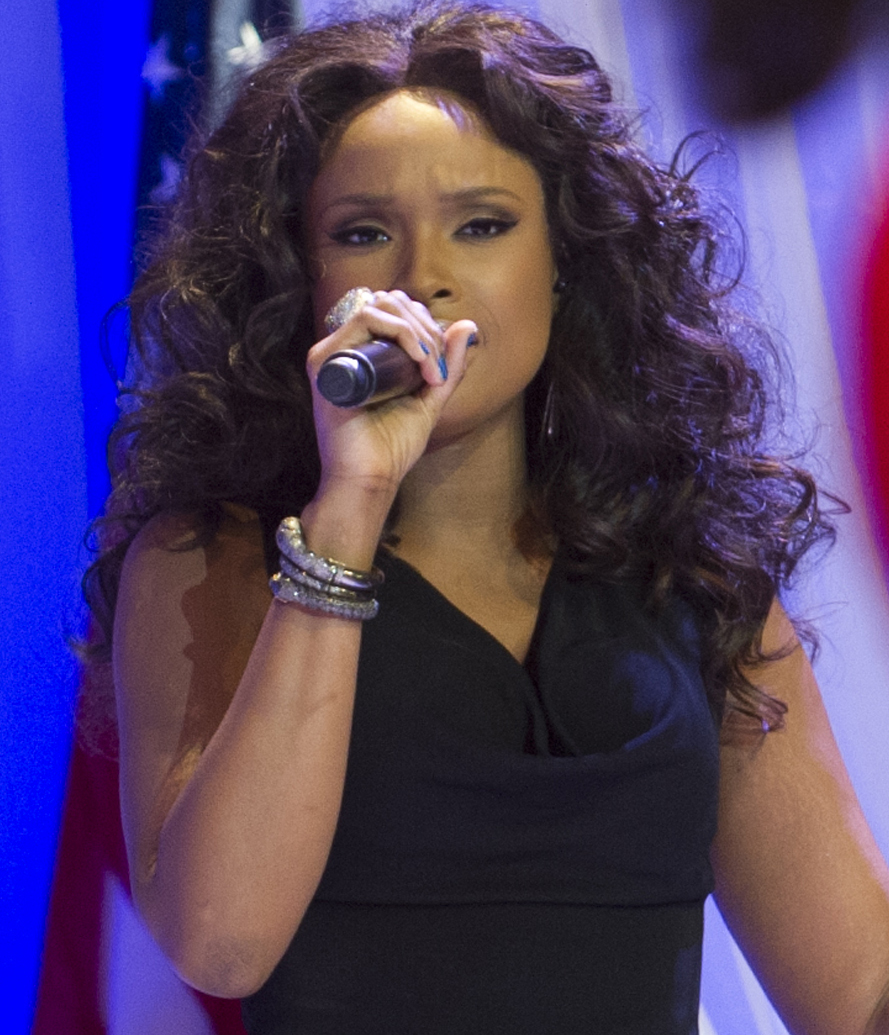
- Hudson in 2013
- Studio albums: 4
- Soundtrack albums: 1
- Singles: 20
- Music videos: 13
- Album appearances: 8
- Soundtrack appearances: 22

American singer and actress Jennifer Hudson has released four studio albums, sixteen singles (including two as a featured artist), five promotional singles and thirteen music videos. She has also made various contributions to other artist's albums and has appeared on the soundtrack for the 2006 musical film, Dreamgirls.

Hudson's music incorporates a range of musical genres such as soul and R&B. Motown is often seen as an influence on Hudson's music. Hudson rose to fame as a contestant on the third series of American Idol, however being eliminated at the "Top 7" stage. Hudson went on to perform as "Effie White" in the 2006 film adaptation of the original production of Broadway musical, Dreamgirls. Hudson won the Academy Award for Best Supporting Actress for her performance, becoming one of the few people to win an award at the ceremony for a debut performance. The soundtrack of the film was again a huge success, reaching number one on the Billboard 200. One of Hudson's performances, "Love You I Do", was nominated for the 2007 Academy Award for Best Original Song, and won the 2008 Grammy Award for Best Song Written for a Motion Picture, Television or Other Visual Media.

Following Hudson's success on Dreamgirls, her self-titled debut album, Jennifer Hudson was released in 2008, to commercial success, debuting at number two on the Billboard 200. Hudson's first single from the album, "Spotlight" was a success around the world, reaching number 24 on the Billboard Hot 100, as well as 11 on its British counterpart. The song also reached number-one on the Hot R&B/Hip-Hop Songs chart. Jennifer Hudson has since been certified Gold in the U.S. Hudson was nominated for three Grammy Awards for Jennifer Hudson, collecting the award for "Best R&B Album" at the 51st Awards Ceremony. Her second album, I Remember Me (2011), also debuted at number two on the Billboard 200 selling 165,000 copies in its first week. The first single, "Where You At", was an R&B hit, reaching the top ten at the Hot R&B/Hip-Hop Songs.

== Studio albums ==
List of albums, with selected chart positions, sales, and certifications
Title	Album details	Peak chart positions										Sales	Certifications
Title	Album details	US	US R&B /HH	AUS	CAN	GER	IRE	JPN	KOR (Int.)	SWI	UK	Sales	Certifications
Jennifer Hudson	Released: September 30, 2008; Label: Arista (#706303), J; Formats: CD, digital download	2	2	73	51	—	46	27	—	—	21	US: 1,000,000 (as of 2011); UK: 172,720 (as of 2011)	RIAA: Gold; BPI: Gold
I Remember Me	Released: March 22, 2011; Label: Arista, J; Formats: CD, digital download	2	2	26	34	84	86	19	13	57	20	US: 675,000 (as of 2014)	RIAA: Gold
JHUD	Released: September 23, 2014; Label: RCA; Formats: CD, digital download	10	2	—	—	—	—	170	59	100	116	US: 100,000 (as of 2014)	
The Gift of Love	Released: October 18, 2024; Label: Interscope; Formats: CD, digital download	160	—	—	—	—	—	—	—	—	—	US: 50,000	
"—" denotes an album that did not chart

== Soundtracks ==
Title	Album details	Peak chart positions		
Title	Album details	US	SWI	UK
Respect	Released: August 13, 2021; Label: Epic, MGM; Formats: Vinyl, CD, digital downloads, streaming	151	93	— (Note: Respect did not enter the UK Albums Chart, but peaked at number 33 on the UK Digital Albums chart and number 2 on the UK Soundtrack Albums chart.)

== Singles ==
=== As lead artist ===
List of singles as lead artist, with selected chart positions and certifications, showing year released and album name
Title	Year	Peak chart positions										Certifications	Album
Title	Year	US	US R&B /HH	AUS	CAN	GER	IRE	KOR (Int.)	SCO	NZ	UK	Certifications	Album
"And I Am Telling You I'm Not Going"	2006	60	14	—	—	—	37	—	32	—	32	BPI: Silver	Dreamgirls: Music from the Motion Picture
"Spotlight"	2008	24	1	96	69	58	32	—	—	21	11	BPI: Platinum; RMNZ: Platinum	Jennifer Hudson
"If This Isn't Love"	2009	63	5	—	—	76	—	— (Note: "If This Isn't Love" did not enter the Korean Goan International Digital chart, but peaked at number 97 on the International Streaming chart.)	—	—	37		Jennifer Hudson
"Giving Myself"	2009	—	84	—	—	—	—	—	—	—			Jennifer Hudson
"Where You At"	2011	64	10	—	—	—	—	15	—	—	103		I Remember Me
"I Remember Me"	2011	—	—	—	—	—	—	30	—	—	89		I Remember Me
"No One Gonna Love You"	2011	—	23	—	—	—	—	—	—	—	—		I Remember Me
"I Got This"	2011	—	54	—	—	—	—	—	—	—	—		I Remember Me
"I Will Always Love You (Live at the 54th Annual Grammy Awards)"	2012	—	— (Note: "I Will Always Love You (Live at the 54th Annual Grammy Awards)" did not enter Billboard Hot R&B/Hip-Hop Songs, but peaked at number 25 on the US Bubbling Under Hot R&B/Hip-Hop Songs chart.,)	—	—	—	—	—	—	—	—		Non-album single
"Think Like a Man" (with Ne-Yo featuring Rick Ross)	2012	90	33	—	—	—	—	20	—	—	—		Think Like a Man OST
"I Can't Describe (The Way I Feel)" (featuring T.I.)	2013	—	— (Note: "I Can't Describe (The Way I Feel)" did not enter Billboard Hot R&B/Hip-Hop Songs, but peaked at number 3 on the US Bubbling Under Hot R&B/Hip-Hop Songs chart. number 27 on the US Hot R&B/Hip-Hop Airplay chart and number 7 on Adult R&B Songs.)	—	—	—	—	54	—	—	109		JHUD
"Walk It Out" (featuring Timbaland)	2014	—	— (Note: "Walk It Out" did not enter Billboard Hot R&B/Hip-Hop Songs, but peaked at number 7 on the US Bubbling Under Hot R&B/Hip-Hop Songs chart., number 43 on the US Hot R&B/Hip-Hop Airplay chart and number 22 on Adult R&B Songs.)	—	—	—	—	56	—	—	—		JHUD
"It's Your World" (featuring R. Kelly)	2014	—	— (Note: "It's Your World" did not enter Billboard Hot R&B/Hip-Hop Songs, but peaked at number 35 on the US Hot R&B/Hip-Hop Airplay chart, number 11 on Adult R&B Songs and number 3 on Dance Club Songs.)	—	—	—	—	—	—	—	—		JHUD
"I Still Love You"	2015	—	—	—	—	—	—	—	—	—	—		JHUD
"Remember Me"	2017	— (Note: "Remember Me" did not enter the US Billboard Hot 100 but peaked at number 19 on the US Adult Contemporary chart.)	—	41	—	—	—	—	50	—	— (Note: "Remember Me" did not enter the UK Singles Chart but peaked at number 55 on the UK Singles Downloads Chart and the UK Singles Sales Chart.)		Non-album singles
"Burden Down"	2017	—	—	—	—	—	—	—	—	—	—		Non-album singles
"I'll Fight"	2018	— (Note: "I'll Fight" did not enter the US Billboard Hot 100, but peaked at number 3 on the US Dance Club Songs chart.)	—	—	—	—	—	—	—	—	—		RBG
"Ain't No Mountain High Enough"	2021	—	— (Note: "Ain’t No Mountain High Enough" did not enter the US Billboard Hot R&B/Hip-Hop Songs chart, but peaked at number 21 on the US Adult R&B Songs chart.)	—	—	—	—	—	—	—	—		Non-album single
"Here I Am (Singing My Way Home)"	2021	—	— (Note: "Here I Am (Singing My Way Home)" did not enter the Billboard Hot R&B/Hip-Hop Songs chart, but peaked at number 21 on the US Adult R&B Songs chart.)	—	—	—	—	—	—	—	—		Respect
"Christmas (Baby Please Come Home)"	2021	—	—	—	—	—	—	—	—	—	—		Non-album single
"—" denotes a recording that did not chart or was not released in that territory.

=== As featured artist ===
List of singles as featured artist, with selected chart positions, showing year released and album name
Title	Year	Peak chart positions							Certifications	Album
Title	Year	US	US R&B /HH	AUS	CAN	IRE	NZ	UK	Certifications	Album
"Overjoyed" (Jamie Williams featuring Jennifer Hudson)	2007	—	—	—	—	—	—	—		After Hours
"We Are the World 25 for Haiti" (as USA for Haiti)	2010	2	—	18	7	9	8	50		Non-album single
"Go All Night" (Gorgon City featuring Jennifer Hudson)	2014	—	—	—	—	—	—	14	BPI: Silver	Sirens
"Trouble" (Iggy Azalea featuring Jennifer Hudson)	2015	67	22	10	73	20	—	7	RIAA: Gold; ARIA: Platinum; BPI: Platinum; RMNZ: Gold	Reclassified
"How Great Thou Art" (Pentatonix featuring Jennifer Hudson)	2017	—	—	—	—	—	—	—		A Pentatonix Christmas
"Oh Santa!" (Mariah Carey featuring Ariana Grande and Jennifer Hudson)	2020	76	20	—	60	76	—	50		Mariah Carey's Magical Christmas Special (Apple TV+ Original Soundtrack)
"—" denotes a recording that did not chart or was not released in that territory.

=== Promotional singles ===
List of promotional singles, with selected chart positions, showing year released and album name
Title	Year	Peak chart positions									Album
Title	Year	US	AUS	AUT	CAN	GER	IRE	NZ	SWI	UK	Album
"The Star-Spangled Banner"	2009	—	—	—	—	—	—	—	—	—	Non-album single
"You Pulled Me Through"	2009	— (Note: "You Pulled Me Through" did not enter the US Billboard Hot 100, but peaked at number 16 on the US Bubbling Under Hot 100 chart.)	—	—	—	—	—	—	—	—	Jennifer Hudson
"One Shining Moment"	2010	—	—	—	—	—	—	—	—	—	Non-album single
"Feeling Good"	2010	—	—	—	—	—	—	—	—	—	I Remember Me
"Night of Your Life" (David Guetta featuring Jennifer Hudson)	2011	81	37	7	30	12	46	38	24	35	Nothing but the Beat
"On Top of the World" (with Pixie Lott, Luan Santana, Yemi Alade & Monali Thakur)	2018	—	—	—	—	—	—	—	—	—	Non-album single
"—" denotes a recording that did not chart or was not released in that territory.

== Other charted songs ==
List of songs, with selected chart positions, showing year released and album name
Single	Year	Peak chart positions										Album
Single	Year	US	US AC	US R&B /HH	US R&B Digital Sales	US Gospel Digital Sales	CAN	KOR Int.	NZ Hot	UK	UK R&B	Album
"Move" (with Beyonce Knowles and Anika Noni Rose)	2006	—	—	—	—	—	—	43	—	—	—	Dreamgirls: Music from the Motion Picture
"Fake Your Way to the Top" (with Beyonce Knowles, Eddie Murphy and Anika Noni Rose)	2006	—	—	—	—	—	—	36	—	—	—	Dreamgirls: Music from the Motion Picture
"Love You I Do"	2006	—	—	—	—	—	—	—	—	80	24	Dreamgirls: Music from the Motion Picture
"Leaving Tonight" (Ne-Yo featuring Jennifer Hudson)	2007	—	—	55	—	—	—	—	—	—	—	Because of You
"All Dressed in Love"	2008	—	—	—	—	—	—	—	—	72	—	Sex and the City Soundtrack
"Jesus Promised Me a Home Over There"	2008	—	—	— (Note: "Jesus Promised Me a Home Over There" did not enter Billboard Hot R&B/Hip-Hop Songs, but peaked at number 10 on the US Bubbling Under Hot R&B/Hip-Hop Songs chart.)	—	6	—	—	—	—	—	Jennifer Hudson
"I'm His Only Woman" (featuring Fantasia)	2008	—	—	— (Note: "I'm His Only Woman" did not enter Billboard Hot R&B/Hip-Hop Songs, but peaked at number 16 on the US Bubbling Under Hot R&B/Hip-Hop Songs chart.)	—	—	—	—	—	—	—	Jennifer Hudson
"Let It Be" (featuring The Roots)	2010	98	—	—	—	—	70	—	—	97	—	Hope for Haiti Now
"Don't Look Down"	2011	—	—	70	—	—	—	—	—	—	—	I Remember Me
"Believe"	2011	—	—	—	—	3	—	—	—	—	—	I Remember Me
"Whatever Makes You Happy" (with Juicy J)	2015	—	—	—	22	—	—	—	—	—	—	Empire: Original Soundtrack from Season 1
"For My God"	2015	—	—	—	—	7	—	—	—	—	—	Empire: The Complete Season 1
"Home" (with Kennedy Holmes)	2018	—	—	—	6	—	—	—	—	—	—	The Season 15 Collection (The Voice Performance)
"Memory"	2019	—	—	—	—	—	—	—	—	— (Note: "Memory" did not enter the UK Singles Chart, but peaked at number 65 on the UK Singles Downloads Chart and UK Singles Sales Chart.)	—	Cats: Highlights from the Motion Picture Soundtrack
"Winter Wonderland"	2024	—	27	—	—	—	—	—	—	—	—	The Gift of Love
"Santa for Someone"	2024	—	—	—	—	—	—	—	37	—	—	The Gift of Love
"—" denotes a recording that did not chart or was not released in that territory.

== Guest appearances ==
Song	Year	Album
"Easy to Be Hard"	2004	Hair – Actor's Fund of America Benefit Recording
"The Future Ain't What It Used to Be" (with Meat Loaf)	2006	Bat Out of Hell III: The Monster Is Loose
"Leaving Tonight" (with Ne-Yo)	2007	Because of You
"The Star-Spangled Banner"	2009	Change Is Now: Renewing America's Promise
"Let It Be Me" (with Rod Stewart)	2009	Soulbook
"You Put a Move on My Heart" (with Quincy Jones)	2010	Q Soul Bossa Nostra
"Proud Mary" (with John Fogerty, Allen Toussaint and Rebirth Brass Band)	2013	Wrote a Song for Everyone
"I'm a Woman" (with Kristin Chenoweth)	2019	For the Girls
"Superstar" (with Anthony Hamilton)	2021	Love Is the New Black

== Soundtrack appearances ==
Song	Year	Album
"Move" (with Beyoncé Knowles and Anika Noni Rose)	2006	Dreamgirls: Music from the Motion Picture
"Fake Your Way to the Top" (with Beyoncé Knowles, Anika Noni Rose and Eddie Murphy)	2006	Dreamgirls: Music from the Motion Picture
"Cadillac Car" (with various artists)	2006	Dreamgirls: Music from the Motion Picture
"Steppin' to The Bad Side" (with various artists)	2006	Dreamgirls: Music from the Motion Picture
"Love You I Do" (with Beyoncé Knowles, Anika Noni Rose and Eddie Murphy)	2006	Dreamgirls: Music from the Motion Picture
"I Want You Baby" (with Beyoncé Knowles, Anika Noni Rose and Eddie Murphy)	2006	Dreamgirls: Music from the Motion Picture
"Family" (with various artists)	2006	Dreamgirls: Music from the Motion Picture
"Dreamgirls" (with Beyoncé Knowles and Anika Noni Rose)	2006	Dreamgirls: Music from the Motion Picture
"It's All Over" (with various artists)	2006	Dreamgirls: Music from the Motion Picture
"And I Am Telling You I'm Not Going"	2006	Dreamgirls: Music from the Motion Picture
"I Am Changing"	2006	Dreamgirls: Music from the Motion Picture
"One Night Only"	2006	Dreamgirls: Music from the Motion Picture
"Dreamgirls"(finale version) (with Beyoncé Knowles, Anika Noni Rose and Sharon Leal)	2006	Dreamgirls: Music from the Motion Picture
"And I Am Telling You I'm Not Going" (dance mix)	2006	Dreamgirls: Music from the Motion Picture
"Love Is Your Color" (with Leona Lewis)	2010	Sex and the City 2
"Bleed for Love" (featuring Soweto Gospel Choir)	2011	Winnie Mandela
"I Can't Let Go"	2013	Smash episode" The Song"
"I Got Love"	2013	Smash episode" The Song"
"Everybody Loves You Now" cover of Billy Joel (with Andy Mientus)	2013	Smash episode" The Song"
"On Broadway" cover of The Drifters (with Katharine McPhee)	2013	Smash episode On Broadway
"Mama Makes Three"	2013	Smash episode On Broadway
"Be Grateful" (with Forest Whitaker and Jacob Latimore)	2013	Black Nativity
"Test of Faith"	2013	Black Nativity
"Hush Child (Get You Through This Silent Night)" (with Jacob Latimore, Luke James and Grace Gibson)	2013	Black Nativity
"He Loves Me Still" (with Angela Bassett)	2013	Black Nativity
"Fix Me Jesus"	2013	Black Nativity
"As" (with Forest Whitaker and Jacob Latimore)	2013	Black Nativity
"I Run"	2015	Chi-Raq (Original Motion Picture Soundtrack)
"Remember the Music"	2015	Empire: Original Soundtrack from Season 1
"Whatever Makes You Happy" (with Juicy J)	2015	Empire: Original Soundtrack from Season 1
"For My God"	2015	Empire: The Complete Season 1
"Big, Blonde and Beautiful"	2016	Hairspray Live!
"I Know Where I've Been"	2016	Hairspray Live!
"You Can't Stop the Beat" (with Maddie Baillio, Garrett Clayton, Ariana Grande, Ephraim Sykes, Harvey Fierstein, Martin Short, Kristin Chenoweth, Dove Cameron, and Company)	2016	Hairspray Live!
"Come So Far (Got So Far to Go)" (with Ariana Grande)	2016	Hairspray Live!
"I'll Follow the Sun" (with the Beat Bugs)	2016	Beat Bugs: Best of Seasons 1 & 2 (Music from the Netflix Original Series)
"Golden Slumbers / Carry That Weight"	2016	Sing: Original Motion Picture Soundtrack
"Hallelujah" (with Tori Kelly)	2016	Sing: Original Motion Picture Soundtrack (Deluxe)
"Memory"	2019	Cats: Highlights from the Motion Picture Soundtrack
"All I Need"	2023	The Color Purple (Music From and Inspired by the Motion Picture)

== Music videos ==
Video	Year	Director
"And I Am Telling You I'm Not Going"	2007	Bill Condon
"Spotlight"	2008	Chris Robinson
"If This Isn't Love"	2009	Diane Martel
"We Are the World 25 for Haiti"	2010	Paul Haggis
"Where You At"	2011	Anthony Mandler
"No One Gonna Love You	2011	Diane Martel
"Think Like a Man"	2012	
"I Can't Describe (The Way I Feel)"	2013	Anthony Mandler
"Walk It Out"	2014	Little X
"I Still Love You	2015	Tabitha Denholm and Molly Schiot
"Remember Me"	2017	
"Burden Down"	2017	Sam Lecca
"Here I Am (Singing My Way Home)"	2021	

== Notes ==
Charts and sales
