= BET Awards 2014 =

American entertainment awards ceremony

14th BET Awards
- Date: June 29, 2014
- Location: Nokia Theatre L.A. Live, Los Angeles, California
- Presented by: Black Entertainment Television
- Hosted by: Chris Rock

Television/radio coverage
- Network: BET

The 14th BET Awards were held at the Nokia Theatre L.A. Live in Los Angeles, California on June 29, 2014. Chris Rock was announced as the host for the awards show on May 14, during the network's 106 & Park music video countdown show. Beyoncé lead the nominations with 6, followed by Jay-Z with 5. Drake, Pharrell Williams and August Alsina were tied for 4. Beyoncé was the biggest winner of the night winning 3 BET Awards, while Nicki Minaj, Drake, August Alsina and Pharrell Williams with 2.

== Performers ==
=== Main Show ===
Artist(s)	Song(s)
Pharrell; Missy Elliott	"Come Get It Bae" (Pharrell) "Pass That Dutch"
Lil Wayne	"Krazy" "Believe Me"
John Legend; Jhene Aiko	"You & I (Nobody in the World)" (Legend) "The Worst"
Chris Brown; Lil Wayne; Tyga; Travis Barker	"Loyal"
Usher	Medley: 1. "Nice and Slow"; 2. "Love in This Club"; 3. "Yeah!"; 4. "Confessions Part I"; 5. "Confessions Part II"; 6. "Follow Me"; 7. "U Remind Me"; 8. "U Don't Have to Call"; 9. "Caught Up"; 10. "Good Kisser"
Jennifer Hudson	"Walk It Out" "It's Your World"
Nicki Minaj	"Chi-Raq" "Pills N Potions" with Burnell Taylor
August Alsina; Chris Brown; Trey Songz	"Kissin' On My Tattoos" (Alsina) "I Luv This S**t (Remix)" "Na Na" (Songz)
John Legend; Ledisi; Yolanda Adams	Tribute to Lionel Richie: 1. "Hello" / "Still" (Legend); 2. "Brick House" (Ledisi); 3. "Jesus Is Love" (Adams)
Lionel Richie	"Easy" "All Night Long (All Night)"
T.I. Iggy Azalea	"No Mediocre" "Fancy" (Azalea)
Troop; Color Me Badd; Silk	Great Love Songs of the 1990s: 1. "All I Do Is Think of You" (Troop); 2. "I Wanna Sex You Up" (Color Me Badd); 3. "Freak Me" (Silk)
Robin Thicke	"Forever Love"
Beyoncé; Jay-Z	"Partition (Remix)"

=== BET Music Matters Stage Performers ===
- Gabi Wilson
- Adrian Marcel
- Sebastian Mikael

== Presenters ==
- Bow Wow
- Keshia Chanté
- Regina Hall
- Kevin Hart
- Keke Palmer
- Larenz Tate
- Gabrielle Union
- Kerry Washington
- Nick Cannon
- Zendaya
- Regina Hall
- Eva Marcille
- Terrence J

== Nominations ==
=== Best Female R&B/Pop Artist ===
- Beyoncé
  - Tamar Braxton
  - Janelle Monáe
  - K. Michelle
  - Rihanna

=== Best Male R&B/Pop Artist ===
- Pharrell Williams
  - John Legend
  - August Alsina
  - Chris Brown
  - Justin Timberlake

=== Best Group ===
- Young Money
  - TGT
  - A$AP Mob
  - Daft Punk
  - Macklemore & Ryan Lewis

=== Best Collaboration ===
- Beyoncé featuring Jay Z – "Drunk in Love"
  - August Alsina featuring Trinidad Jame$ - "I Luv This Shit"
  - Drake featuring Majid Jordan – "Hold On, We're Going Home"
  - Robin Thicke featuring T.I. and Pharrell Williams – "Blurred Lines"
  - Jay Z featuring Justin Timberlake – "Holy Grail"
  - YG featuring Jeezy and Rich Homie Quan – "My Hitta"

=== Coca-Cola Viewers' Choice Award ===
- August Alsina featuring Trinidad Jame$ – "I Luv This Shit"
  - Beyoncé featuring Jay Z – "Drunk in Love"
  - Drake – "Worst Behavior"
  - Jhené Aiko – "The Worst"
  - Pharrell Williams – "Happy"

=== Best Male Hip Hop Artist ===
- Drake
  - Kendrick Lamar
  - J. Cole
  - Future
  - Jay Z

=== Best Female Hip Hop Artist ===
- Nicki Minaj
  - Angel Haze
  - Charli Baltimore
  - Eve
  - Iggy Azalea

=== Video of the Year ===
- Pharrell Williams – "Happy"
  - Beyoncé – "Partition"
  - Beyoncé featuring Jay Z – "Drunk in Love"
  - Chris Brown – "Fine China"
  - Drake – "Worst Behavior"

=== Video Director of the Year ===
- Hype Williams
  - Benny Boom
  - Colin Tilley
  - Director X
  - Chris Brown

=== Best New Artist ===
- August Alsina
  - Ariana Grande
  - Mack Wilds
  - Rich Homie Quan
  - ScHoolboy Q

=== Best Gospel Artist ===
- Tamela Mann
  - Donnie McClurkin
  - Erica Campbell
  - Hezekiah Walker
  - Tye Tribbett

=== Best Actress ===
- Lupita Nyong'o
  - Angela Bassett
  - Oprah Winfrey
  - Kerry Washington
  - Gabrielle Union

=== Best Actor ===
- Chiwetel Ejiofor
  - Forest Whitaker
  - Idris Elba
  - Kevin Hart
  - Michael B. Jordan

=== YoungStars Award ===
- Keke Palmer
  - Gabrielle Douglas
  - Jacob Latimore
  - Jaden Smith
  - Zendaya

=== Best Movie ===
- 12 Years a Slave
  - Lee Daniels' The Butler
  - The Best Man Holiday
  - Fruitvale Station
  - Kevin Hart: Let Me Explain

=== Subway Sportswoman of the Year ===
- Serena Williams
  - Brittney Griner
  - Lolo Jones
  - Venus Williams
  - Skylar Diggins

=== Subway Sportsman of the Year ===
- Kevin Durant
  - Blake Griffin
  - Carmelo Anthony
  - Floyd Mayweather Jr.
  - LeBron James

=== Centric Award ===
- Jhené Aiko – "The Worst"
  - Aloe Blacc – "The Man"
  - Jennifer Hudson featuring T.I. – "I Can't Describe (The Way I Feel)"
  - Liv Warfield – "Why Do You Lie?"
  - Wale feat Sam Dew – "LoveHate Thing"

=== FANdemonium Award ===
- Beyoncé
  - Trey Songz
  - Rihanna
  - Justin Timberlake

=== Best International Act: Africa ===
- Diamond Platnumz
- Davido
  - Mafikizolo
  - Sarkodie
  - Tiwa Savage
  - Toofan

=== Best International Act: UK ===
- Krept and Konan
  - Dizzee Rascal
  - Ghetts
  - Laura Mvula
  - Tinie Tempah
  - Rita Ora
