= I Got This (Jennifer Hudson song) =

Single by Jennifer Hudson

from the album I Remember Me
- Released: October 30, 2011
- Recorded: 2011
- Studio: Roc the Mic Studios (New York City)
- Genre: R&B
- Length: 3:22
- Label: Arista Records; J
- Songwriters: Tor Erik Hermansen; Mikkel Erikssen, Crystle Johnson; Mats Lie Skåre
- Producer: StarGate

Jennifer Hudson singles chronology
"No One Gonna Love You" (2011)	"I Got This" (2011)	"Think Like a Man" (2012)

"I Got This" is a song performed by American singer and songwriter Jennifer Hudson. It was released as the third and final single in the United States from her second studio album, I Remember Me (2011). It was written by Tor Erik Hermansen, Mikkel Erikssen, Crystle Johnson and Mats Lie Skare, with production by StarGate. It was recorded by Mikkel S. Eriken and Miles Walker at Roc The Mic Studios, New York, NYC. It was released to United States contemporary hit radio on October 30, 2011.

== Background and promotion ==
On September 21, 2011, the song was confirmed to be the next single from the album following "Where You At" and "No One Gonna Love You" in an interview with ABC. On October 25, 2011, Hudson released an audio video of the song on her Vevo channel.

== Chart performance ==
On March 12, 2012, the song peaked at number fifty-four on the Billboard Hot R&B/Hip Hop Songs Chart. On March 17, 2012, the song peaked at number eleven on the Adult R&B Songs Chart.

== Charts ==
Chart (2012)	Peak position
US Hot R&B/Hip-Hop Songs (Billboard)	54
US Adult R&B Songs (Billboard)	11
