= Blue Collar (album) =

Studio album by Rhymefest
- Released: July 11, 2006
- Recorded: 2003–2006
- Studios: Animal House Studios (Milwaukee, WI); Baseline Recording Studios II (New York, NY); Encore Studios (Burbank, CA); Allido Sound (New York, NY); Tree Sound Studios (Atlanta, GA); The Record Room (North Miami, FL); Franco De Leon Recording Studio (Chicago, IL); Duplex Studios (Chicago, IL)
- Genre: Hip-hop
- Length: 58:23
- Labels: AllIDo; J
- Producers: Animal House; Cochise; Cool & Dre; Emile; Just Blaze; Kanye West; Mark Ronson; No I.D.; Terry Hunter

Rhymefest chronology
Blue Collar (2006)	El Che (2010)

Singles from Blue Collar
- 1. "Brand New" Released: September 6, 2005; 2. "Dynomite (Going Postal)" Released: March 14, 2006; 3. "Stick" Released: July 11, 2006

Professional ratings
Review scores
Source	Rating
AllMusic	3.5/5 stars
The A.V. Club	A
The Guardian	4/5 stars
HipHopDX	4/5
IGN	8.3/10
Pitchfork	8/10
PopMatters	8/10
Slant	4/5 stars
Spin	3/5 stars
The Village Voice	A−

Blue Collar is the debut studio album by American rapper Rhymefest. It was released on July 11, 2006 via Allido/J Records.

The album was recorded at Animal House Studios in Milwaukee, at Baseline Recording Studios II and Allido Sound in New York City, at Encore Studios in Burbank, at Tree Sound Studios in Atlanta, at The Record Room in North Miami and at Franco De Leon Recording Studio in Chicago, with additional recording took place at Duplex Studios in Chicago.

Production was handled by No I.D., Mark Ronson, Animal House, Cool & Dre, Emile, Cochise, Just Blaze, Kanye West and Terry Hunter. It features guest appearances from Kanye West, Bump J, Citizen Cope, Malik Yusef, Mario, Mike Payne, Mikkey, Q-Tip and the late Ol' Dirty Bastard.

In the United States, the album debuted at number 61 on the Billboard 200 and number 10 on the Top R&B/Hip-Hop Albums charts. Its lead single, "Brand New", made it to number 32 on the UK singles chart.

== Track listing ==
No.	Title	Writer(s)	Producer(s)	Length
1.	"Feel Free (Intro)" (featuring Q-Tip)	Jonathan Davis; Mike Payne; Jon Frost	Animal House	1:11
2.	"Dynomite (Going Postal)"	Che Smith; Justin Smith; Jerry Harris; Toby Henry; Sylvia Robinson	Just Blaze	3:50
3.	"Brand New" (featuring Kanye West)	C. Smith; Kanye West; Gabriel Roth	Kanye West	3:40
4.	"Fever"	John Davenport; Eddie Cooley	No I.D.	3:48
5.	"All I Do"	C. Smith; Emile Haynie; Jeremy Ball; Willie Hutchinson	Emile; Cochise	3:27
6.	"Get Down"	C. Smith; Ernest Wilson; Pierre Barouh; Francis Lai	No I.D.	3:02
7.	"More" (featuring Kanye West)	C. Smith; West; Marcello Valenzano; Andre Lyon	Cool & Dre	4:12
8.	"Chicago-Rillas" (featuring Mikkey and Bump J)	C. Smith; Mikkel Nance; Terrance Boykin; Wilson; Michael Snoddy	No I.D.	4:27
9.	"Stick"	C. Smith; Frost	Animal House	3:31
10.	"All Girls Cheat" (featuring Mario)	C. Smith; Valenzano; Lyon; Ernie Isley; Rudolph Isley; Ronald Isley; Marvin Isley; O'Kelly Isley; Christopher Jasper	Cool & Dre; Mark Ronson (co.)	4:13
11.	"Devil's Pie"	C. Smith; Mark Ronson; Julian Casablancas	Mark Ronson	4:51
12.	"Sister" (featuring Mike Payne)	C. Smith; Garry Glenn	No I.D.; Rhymefest (co.)	3:54
13.	"Mr. Blue Collar (Interlude)" (featuring Malik Yusef)	Malik Yusef; Terry Hunter	Terry Hunter	2:01
14.	"Bullet" (featuring Citizen Cope)	C. Smith; Clarence Greenwood; Haynie	Emile; Mark Ronson (co.); Jon Brion (add.)	4:00
15.	"Tell a Story"	C. Smith; Ronson; Vernon Bullock; Harvey Fuqua; Harry Nilsson	Mark Ronson	4:30
16.	"Build Me Up" (featuring Ol' Dirty Bastard)	C. Smith; Ronson; Tony Macaulay; Mike d'Abo	Mark Ronson	3:46
Total length:				58:23

Sample credits

- Track 2 contains a sample from "We Will Always Be Together" written by Jerry Harris, Toby Henry and Sylvia Robinson as performed by The Whatnauts and a sample from "The Black Prince Has Arrived" performed by Jimmie Walker.
- Track 3 contains a sample of "The Dap Dip" performed by Sharon Jones & the Dap-Kings and a portion of the composition "Pick It Up, Lay It in the Cut" written by Gabriel Roth.
- Track 4 contains a sample from "Fever" written by John Davenport and Eddie Cooley performed by La Lupe.
- Track 5 contains a sample from "Ain't That (Mellow Mellow)" written by Willie Hutchinson as performed by Willie Hutch.
- Track 6 contains a sample from "Un Homme et Une Femme" written by Pierre Barouh and Francis Lai as performed by Francis Lai.
- Track 9 contains a sample of "Take Me to the Mardi Gras".
- Track 10 contains a sample from "Think of Your Thoughts as Children" written and performed by Phillipe Wynn and a portion of the composition "Footsteps in the Dark" written by Ernie Isley, Rudolph Isley, Ronald Isley, Marvin Isley, O'Kelly Isley Jr. and Chris Jasper.
- Track 11 contains a sample from "Someday" written by Julian Casablancas as performed by The Strokes.
- Track 12 contains a sample from "Intimate Friends" written by Garry Glenn as performed by Eddie Kendricks.
- Track 14 contains a sample from "Bullet and a Target" written by Clarence Greenwood as performed by Citizen Cope.
- Track 15 contains a sample from "You Don't Have to Be Alone" written by Vernon Bullock and Harvey Fuqua as performed by The New Birth and a portion of the composition "One" written by Harry Nilsson.
- Track 16 contains a portion of the composition "Build Me Up Buttercup" written by Tony Macaulay and Mike d'Abo.

== Charts ==
Chart (2006)	Peak position
UK R&B Albums (Official Charts)	13
US Billboard 200	61
US Top R&B/Hip-Hop Albums (Billboard)	10
