= Walk It Out =

Walk It Out may refer to:

== Songs ==
- "Walk It Out" (Unk song), 2006
- "Walk It Out" (Jennifer Hudson song), 2014

== Other ==
- Walk It Out! (video game), 2010 Wii game published by Konami, co-developed by Hudson Soft and A.I Co., Ltd. Known as Step To The Beat in PAL regions.
