= Hero (Kirk Franklin album) =

Studio album by Kirk Franklin
- Released: October 4, 2005
- Recorded: July 2005
- Genre: Urban contemporary gospel
- Length: 77:26
- Labels: GospoCentric, Fo Yo Soul Entertainment, Zomba Group
- Producers: Kirk Franklin, Shaun Martin (co), Chris Godbey (co)

Kirk Franklin chronology
A Season of Remixes (2003)	Hero (2005)	Songs for the Storm (2006)

Professional ratings
Review scores
Source	Rating
Allmusic	4/5 stars

Hero is the eighth album by Kirk Franklin, released October 4, 2005 on GospoCentric Records. Hero was certified as Gold by the Recording Industry Association of America (RIAA) on December 2, 2005 and Platinum on December 14, 2006. it is one of the best-selling gospel albums of all time. In 2007, Hero won the Grammy Award for Best Contemporary Soul Gospel Album and "Imagine Me" won the Grammy Award for Best Gospel Song.

== Synopsis ==
Produced by Franklin and co-produced by Shaun Martin and Chris Godbey, the album features songs with several urban contemporary gospel and R&B artists including Dorinda Clark-Cole, Tye Tribbett, Marvin Winans (member of the Winans), Stevie Wonder, Yolanda Adams, and J. Moss.

== Track listing ==
#	Title	Time	Notes
1.	"Intro (America the Beautiful)"	0:45	Vocals by the African Children’s Choir; written by Katharine Lee Bates and Samuel A. Ward
2.	"Looking for You"	4:06	Samples "Haven't You Heard" written by Rushen, Charles Mims, Sheree Brown, Freddie Washington as performed by Patrice Rushen and appears on the soundtrack to "Norbit"; written by Kirk Franklin.
3.	"Hero" (featuring Dorinda Clark Cole)	5:20	Written by Franklin
4.	"Interlude #1" (featuring Fred Hammond)	0:55	Written by Franklin
5.	"Let It Go" (featuring Sonny Sandoval of P.O.D. and tobyMac)	4:59	Samples "Shout" written by Roland Orzabal and Ian Stanley as performed by Tears for Fears; written by Franklin
6.	"The Process"	1:08	
7.	"Imagine Me"	5:18	2007 Grammy Award for Best Gospel Song; written by Franklin
8.	"Could've Been" (featuring J Moss and Tye Tribbett)	6:47	Written by Franklin
9.	"Better"	4:00	Produced & Written by Dre & Vidal and Kirk Franklin
10.	"Afterwhile" (featuring Yolanda Adams)	2:51	Written by Franklin
11.	"Brokenhearted" (featuring Marvin L. Winans)	6:01	Written by Franklin
12.	"Without You"	5:02	Written by Franklin
13.	"Keep Your Head"	4:36	Samples Keep Your Head to the Sky by Earth, Wind, and Fire
14.	"Why" (featuring Stevie Wonder)	4:36	Samples Free by Deniece Williams
15.	"First Love"	5:52	Written by Franklin
16.	"The Appeal"	7:21	Written by Franklin
17.	"Brokenhearted (Reprise)"	1:09	
18.	"Interlude #2"	0:30	
19.	"Sunshine"	4:59	Samples "You Bring The Sun Out" written by Jessy Dixon and Tom Snow as performed by Randy Crawford and Say You Love Me written by D. J. Rogers as performed by Jennifer Holliday; written by Franklin and Ernie Green
20.	"Outro"	1:11	Written by Kerrion Franklin

== Personnel ==
*Note: Personnel listing from Hero album liner.

=== Vocalists ===
- Ashley Guilbert
- Nikki Ross
- Daphanie Wright
- Anaysha Figueroa
- Faith Anderson
- Erica Davis
- Jana Bell
- Charmaine Swimpson
- Isaac Carree
- Eric Moore
- Jason Champion
- Anthony Evans
- Myron Butler

=== Instrumentalists ===
- Kirk Franklin - Keyboards, Minimoog, Piano, Drum Programming
- Terry Baker - Drums
- Shaun Martin - Keyboards, Drum Programming, Minimoog, Programming, Drums
- Jerome Harmon - Keyboards, Hammond B3
- Braylon Lacy - Bass Guitar
- Doc Powell - Lead Guitar, Acoustic Guitar
- Ernie G - DJ, Keyboards, Programming
- Jason Bell - Lead Guitar
- Sheila E. - Percussion, Percussion Color
- Chris Godbey - Programming
- Vidal Davis - Percussion, Additional Instruments
- Andre Harris - Percussion, Additional Instruments
- Ryan Toby - Percussion
- Jason Boyd - Percussion
- Humberto Ruiz - Trombone
- Lee Thornburg - Trumpet
- Paul Cerra - Saxophone
- Dave Monsch - Baritone Sax
- Jamie Hovorka - Trumpet

=== Orchestra ===
- Assa Drori – Violin
- Agnes Gottschewsky – Violin
- Armen Garabedian – Violin
- Elizabeth Wilson – Violin
- Sally Berman – Violin
- Brian Benning – Violin
- Irma Neumann – Violin
- Berj Garabedian – Violin
- Robert Brosseau – Violin
- Shari Zippert – Violin
- Kazi Pitelka – Viola
- Jorge Moraga – Viola
- Renita Koven – Viola
- Karie Prescott – Viola
- Cecilia Tsan – Cello
- Dan Smith – Cello
- Miguel Martinez – Cello
- Earl Madison – Cello
- Frances Liu – Contrabass
- Nicholas Phillippon – Contrabass
- Katie Kirkpatrick – Harp
- Gary Foster – Flute
- Sheridan Stokes – Flute
- Vince Trombetta, Jr. – Flute
- Larry Caplan – Flute
- Don Shelton – Clarinet
- Jeff Driskill – Alto Clarinet
- Phil Feather – Bass Clarinet/Oboe
- John Mitchell – E♭ Contrabass Clarinet/Bassoon
- David Duke – French horn
- John Reynolds – French horn
- Loren Marstellar – Baritone horn
- Chuck Koontz – Tuba
- Brent Fischer – cymbals/Timpani

== Notable singles ==
Hero featured the singles "Looking for You" and "Imagine Me". "Looking for You" was released as a single on September 20, 2005 in the U.S. and was a top-five hit on the Billboard's Hot R&B/Hip-Hop Songs chart.

== Charts ==
Hero peaked at No. 13 on The Billboard 200 chart on October 22, 2005, It also reached No. 4 on the Billboard Top R&B/Hip-Hop Albums chart.

=== Weekly charts ===
Chart (2005)	Peak position
US Billboard 200	13
US Top R&B/Hip-Hop Albums (Billboard)	4

=== Year-end charts ===
Chart (2006)	Position
US Billboard 200	108
US Top R&B/Hip-Hop Albums (Billboard)	32

=== Decade-end charts ===
Chart (2000–2009)	Peak position
US Top Gospel Albums (Billboard)	5

== Awards ==
In 2006, the album won a Dove Award for Urban Album of the Year at the 37th GMA Dove Awards. The song "Looking for You" also won a Dove Award for Urban Recorded Song of the Year.
