= El Che =

El Che may refer to:

- Che Guevara (1928-1967), an Argentine Marxist revolutionary
- Cheteshwar Pujara (1988-), an Indian Test Cricket Batsman
- El Che (album), a 2010 album by Rhymefest
