= Looking for You =

Single by Kirk Franklin

from the album Hero
- Released: 2005
- Recorded: 2005
- Genre: Gospel; house; disco; R&B
- Length: 4:06
- Label: GospoCentric
- Songwriters: Patrice Rushen, Charles Mims Jr, Kirk Franklin, Sheree Brown, Freddie Washington
- Producer: Kirk Franklin

Kirk Franklin singles chronology
"Brighter Day" (2002)	"Looking for You" (2005)	"Imagine Me" (2006)

"Looking For You" is a gospel song by Kirk Franklin and the lead single from his 2005 album Hero.

The song contains a sample from "Haven't You Heard," which was written by Patrice Rushen, Charles Mims Jr, Sheree Brown, and Freddie Washington.

== In film ==
"Looking for You" was part of the soundtrack of the 2007 film Norbit, played during the closing credits.

== Awards ==
The song won a Dove Award for Urban Recorded Song of the Year at the 37th GMA Dove Awards.

== Commercial performance ==
"Looking for You" became a crossover hit as it was popular with gospel, R&B, and pop audiences. The song reached number five on the R&B/Hip-Hop Songs chart, number 61 on the Billboard Hot 100, and number one on the Hot Gospel Songs chart in the United States, making it Kirk Franklin's most successful single to date.

== Personnel ==
Personnel adapted from Hero liner notes.

- Shaun Martin – drum programming, keyboards, Minimoog
- Chris Godbey – drum programming, tracking engineer
- Kirk Franklin – drum programming, keyboards
- Jerome Harmon – keyboard
- D.J. Ernest "Ernie G" Green – Minimoog
- Dave Pensado – mixing engineer

== Charts ==
=== Weekly charts ===
Chart (2005–2006)	Peak position
US Billboard Hot 100	61
US Adult R&B Songs (Billboard)	4
US Hot Gospel Songs (Billboard)	1
US Hot R&B/Hip-Hop Songs (Billboard)	5
Chart (2019)	Peak position
UK Singles Downloads (Official Charts)	87
UK Singles Sales Chart (OCC)	87
UK Physical Singles Chart (OCC)	58

=== Year-end charts ===
Chart (2006)	Position
US Hot R&B/Hip-Hop Songs (Billboard)	5
