= Burnell Taylor =

American singer

- Born: April 14, 1993 (age 33); New Orleans, Louisiana
- Genres: R&B, pop
- Occupation: Singer
- Instrument: Singing
- Years active: 2013–present

Burnell Taylor (born April 14, 1993) is an American singer, who came in seventh place on the twelfth season of American Idol.

== Early life ==
Burnell Taylor was born on April 14, 1993, in from New Orleans, Louisiana. He graduated from Sarah T. Reed High School in 2011. He and his family were survivors of Hurricane Katrina.

== American Idol ==
Taylor auditioned in Baton Rouge, singing "I'm Here". He performed the same song during the semifinals and made it to the top 10. During the top 10, 9, and 8 weeks, he was favored by judges and Jimmy Iovine (when compared to the other boys). He received the lowest number of votes after his top 7 performance of "You Give Love a Bad Name" by Bon Jovi, and was sent home on April 4, 2013, after the judges decided against using their "Judges' Save" power.

=== Performances and results ===
Episode	Theme	Song choice	Original artist	Order #	Result
Audition	Auditioner's choice	"I'm Here"	LaChanze	N/A	Advanced
Hollywood Round, part 1	A Capella	Not aired		N/A	Advanced
Hollywood Round, part 2	Group performance	"Some Kind of Wonderful"	Soul Brothers Six	N/A	Advanced
Hollywood Round, part 3	Solo	"Jar of Hearts"	Christina Perri	N/A	Advanced
Las Vegas Round	Personal choice	"This Time"	John Legend	8	Advanced
Top 20 (10 men)	Personal choice	"I'm Here"	LaChanze	5	Advanced
Top 10 reveal	Victory song	"Ready for Love"	India.Arie	2	N/A
Top 10	Music of the American Idols	"Flying Without Wings"	Westlife	9	Safe (7th)
Top 9	The Beatles	"Let It Be"	The Beatles	2	Safe
Top 8	Music of Motor City	Solo "My Cherie Amour"	Stevie Wonder	7	Bottom 3^{1}
Top 8	Music of Motor City	Trio "I Can't Help Myself (Sugar Pie Honey Bunch)" with Lazaro Arbos and Devin Velez	Four Tops	10	Bottom 3^{1}
Top 7	Rock	Solo "You Give Love a Bad Name"	Bon Jovi	1	Eliminated
Top 7	Rock	Duet "The Letter" with Candice Glover	The Box Tops	4	Eliminated

- ^Note 1 When Ryan Seacrest announced the results for this particular night, Taylor was among the bottom three, but was declared safe first.

== Post-Idol ==
Taylor took part in the American Idols LIVE! Tour 2013 from July 19 and to August 31, 2013. He performed with Nicki Minaj on her song "Pills N Potion" at the 2014 BET Awards on June 29, 2014.
