= Remember Me (Jennifer Hudson song) =

Single by Jennifer Hudson
- Released: March 3, 2017
- Genre: R&B
- Length: 3:52
- Label: Epic
- Songwriters: Jennifer Hudson; Jamie Hartman; Konstantin Sherer; Vincent Stein
- Producers: Jamie Hartman; Konstantin Sherer

Jennifer Hudson singles chronology
"I Still Love You" (2015)	"Remember Me" (2017)	"Burden Down" (2017)

"Remember Me" is a song recorded by American singer Jennifer Hudson and was released on March 3, 2017, by Epic Records. A midtempo ballad, "Remember Me" was written by Hudson, Jamie Hartman, Konstantin Sherer and Vincent Stein, with production by Hartman and Stein.

== Background and promotion ==
Following the release of Hudson's third studio album JHUD in 2014, it was announced she had left RCA Records and had signed a new contract with Epic Records on June 28, 2016. Hudson said to Billboard magazine: "I couldn’t be more excited to embark on this new chapter with two of the most prolific musical legends of this generation, there is no doubt that this is just the beginning of a very special collaboration and I know that the result will be something unforgettable. I am looking forward to the creative process and sharing new music very soon!"

On March 2, 2017, a day before the song's release, Hudson released an audio clip of the song on her YouTube channel. On March 5, 2017, Hudson performed the song on The Voice UK.

== Critical reception ==
The song was met with positive reviews from critics. Rap-Up stated in a review "The Oscar and Grammy winner flexes her powerful pipes on the rousing record, which she co-wrote with Jamie Hartman." Mike Wass from Idolator stated "Jennifer Hudson finally found the appropriate vehicle for those bone-rattling vocals on 'Remember Me', the first taste of the diva's fourth LP is soaring mid-tempo ballad with gut-wrenching lyrics".

== Music video ==
The music video for "Remember Me" premiered on April 10, 2017.

== Chart performance ==
In the United Kingdom, the song debuted at number sixty-seven on the UK Singles Downloads Chart on March 10, 2017. In its second week the song fell thirty-one places to number ninety-eight before falling out of the Top 100 downloads chart. The song re-entered the chart at number seventy-one on April 14, 2017. On April 21, 2017, the song reached its peak charting at number fifty-five.

In Scotland, the song debuted at number sixty on the Scottish Singles Chart. In its second week the song fell thirty-six places to number ninety-six. In its third week the song rose to four places charting at number ninety-two before falling out of the Top 100. The song re-entered the chart at number fifty-seven on April 14, 2017. On April 21, 2017, the song reached its peak, charting at number fifty.

== Track listing ==
Digital download

1. "Remember Me" – 3:52

Digital download - The Remixes

1. "Remember Me" (Kat Krazy Remix) – 3:30
2. "Remember Me" (BAUT Remix) – 3:57
3. "Remember Me" (Ryan Riback Remix) – 3:27
4. "Remember Me" ("J-C" Carr Remix) – 4:48
5. "Remember Me" (Dave Audé Remix) – 3:46

== Personnel ==
Credits adapted from Tidal.

- Jamie Hartman - acoustic guitar, background vocals, band leader, bass, keyboards, piano, strings
- Jennifer Hudson - background vocals
- Elizabeth Komba - background vocals
- Nelson Raphael Beato, Jr. - background vocals
- Lakeisha Lewis - background vocals
- Jeremy Rubelino - band leader
- Vanessa Freebairn-Smith - cello
- Victor Lawrence - cello
- Alisha Bauer - cello
- Alex Williams - engineer
- Joe LaPorta - mastering engineer
- Konstantin Sherer - misc. producer, programmer
- Michael Brauer - mixing engineer
- Mark Robertson - other, violin
- Matt Dyson - recording engineer
- Jorge Velasco - recording engineer
- Rodney Wirtz - viola
- Grace Park - viola
- Andrew Duckles - viola
- Songa Lee - violin
- Cheryl Kim - violin
- Neli Nikolaeva - violin
- Eugenia Choi - violin
- Sam Fischer - violin

== Charts ==
Chart (2017)	Peak position
Australia (ARIA)	41
Scotland (OCC)	50
UK Download (OCC)	55
US Adult Contemporary (Billboard)	19

== Release history ==
Region	Date	Format	Label	Ref
United Kingdom	March 3, 2017	Digital download	Epic	
United States	March 3, 2017	Digital download	Epic	
