= Help Me Believe =

Song by Kirk Franklin

from the album The Fight of My Life
- Length: 6:51
- Label: GospoCentric Records
- Composer(s): Kirk Franklin
- Producer(s): Kirk Franklin

"Help Me Believe" is a song by gospel/hip hop musician Kirk Franklin from his 2007 album, The Fight of My Life. It won the Grammy Award for "Best Gospel Song" at the 51st Grammy Awards in 2009.
