= Rhymefest =

American rapper

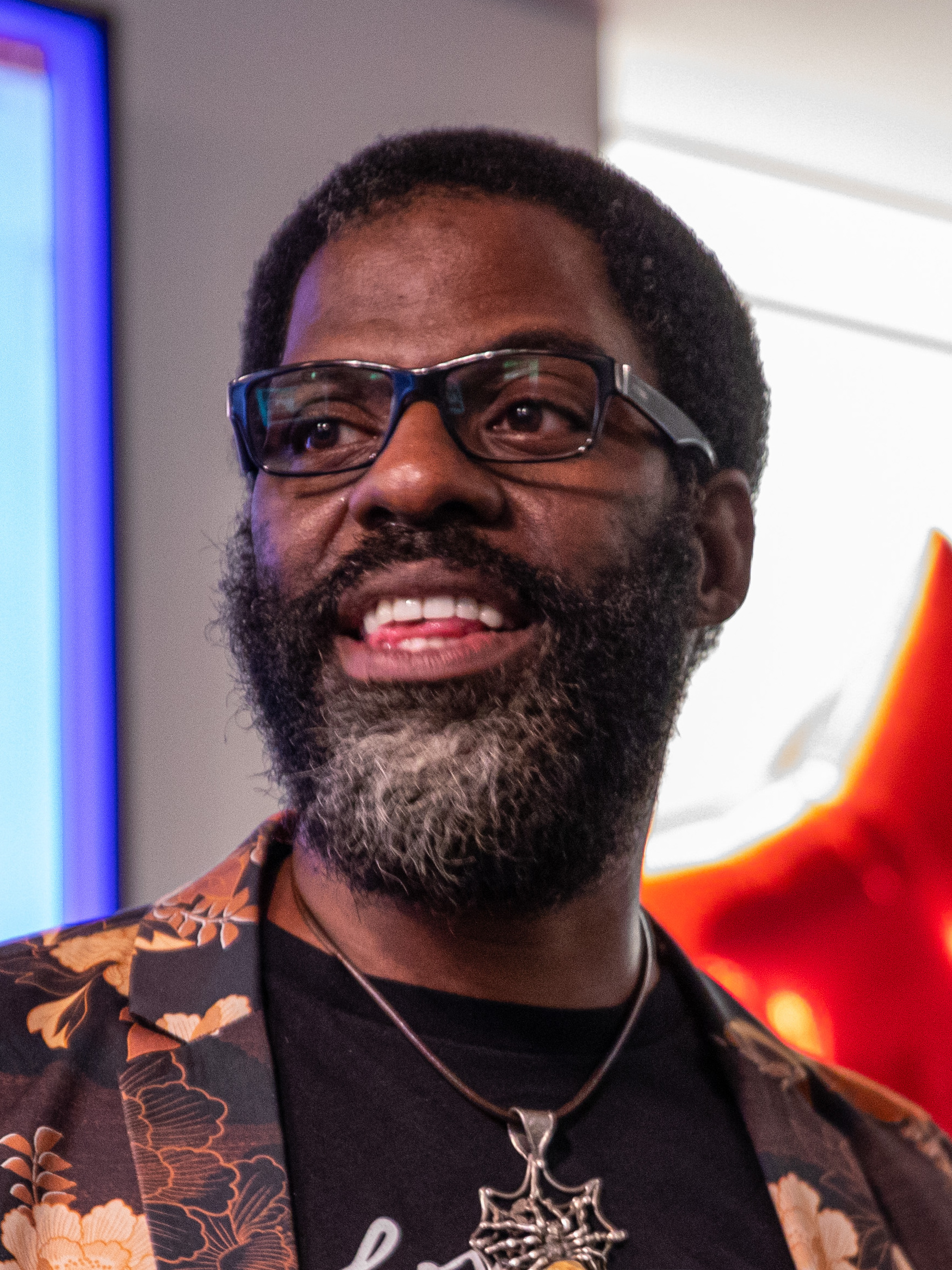
- Rhymefest in 2023

Background information
- Born: Che Armond Smith; July 6, 1977 (age 49); Chicago, Illinois, U.S.
- Genre: Midwestern hip-hop
- Occupations: Rapper; songwriter
- Years active: 1996–present
- Labels: Allido; J; dNBe
- Website: cheworldwide.com

Che Armond Smith (born July 6, 1977), known professionally as Rhymefest, is an American rapper and songwriter from Chicago, Illinois. He is best known for his work with fellow Chicago rapper Kanye West, having co-written West's "Jesus Walks" (which won Best Rap Song) in 2004 and "New Slaves" in 2013. He also co-wrote "Glory", for Common and John Legend in 2014, which received a Golden Globe Award for Best Original Song and an Academy Award for Best Original Song.

As a recording artist, he signed with Mark Ronson's Allido Records, an imprint of J Records to release his debut album, Blue Collar.

== Career ==
Che Armond Smith was born on July 6, 1977 in Chicago, Illinois. Rhymefest started off battle rapping at events such as JumpOff and ScribbleJam against acts like Eminem and Chalk. Smith co-wrote "Glory" alongside John Legend and Common, for the 2014 motion picture Selma. The song received the 2014 Golden Globe Award for Best Original Song and the 2014 Academy Award for Best Original Song. Che has expanded his gifts beyond the borders of music. The subject of the Showtime and Break Thru Films documentary, "In My Father's House", Rhymefest purchased the childhood home of his estranged father only to find that he'd been homeless for most of Che's life, Rhymefest then embarks on a journey to reconnect and redeem their relationship. Rhymefest's film debut was in Emilio Estevez's 2018 film The Public. He played "Big George", starring alongside Alec Baldwin, Gabrielle Union, Taylor Shilling, Michael K. Williams, Christian Slater, and more. Rhymefest has revealed that he will be releasing an album soon titled Love Lessons Pt. 1. The track "OG Philosophy" featuring Black Thought and Raheem DeVaughn arrived in early 2020.

== Politics ==
In 2006, Smith was invited to the British House of Commons to discuss hip-hop and policy with David Cameron. In October 2010, Smith announced his candidacy for Chicago's 20th ward alderman. He placed second in the February 22, 2011 election, and was defeated by incumbent Willie Cochran in the April 5, 2011 runoff election, getting 45.4% of the vote to Cochran's 54.6%.

In 2016, he hosted a "Truth & Reconciliation" event series to enhance awareness about gun violence in Chicago. He ran for an elected position as a member of the Chicago school board in the inaugural 2024 election for the post, and won in the 10th district, which is located on Chicago's south side.

== Art of Culture (formerly Donda's House) ==
Rhymefest is Executive Director and co-Founder of Art of Culture (formerly Donda's House), Inc. The organization was originally named after Kanye West's mother Donda West. Artists who were accepted into Donda's House include Hex Hectic.

== Personal life ==
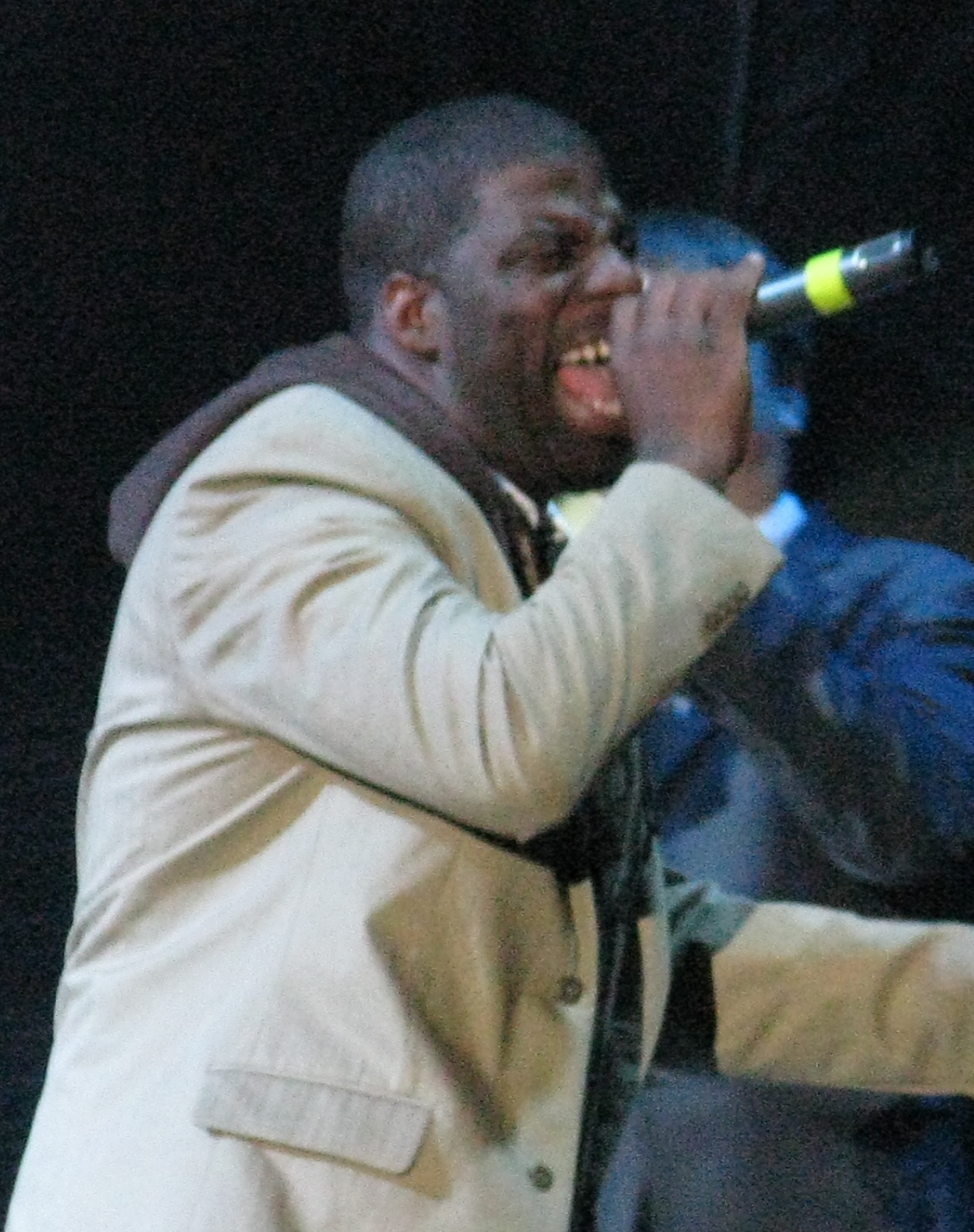
Rhymefest in Manchester, on tour with Kanye West

Rhymefest is Muslim. He has three children and has been married to Donnie Smith since 2010.

=== Che Guevara namesake ===
Che Smith, named for the Marxist revolutionary Che Guevara, addressed the matter, stating:

"When you have a name, a real name, like Che, it's definitely something, whether you want to or not, something that you have to live up to. How could I be named Che and then do all songs about dancing in the club and who got the fattest ass? That would be an oxymoron to who I am. I think there's something very important in a name. So I think when we name ourselves and name our children, I think we have to think about what the future will look like. I named my son Solomon, and when people look at him they say, "Oh, Solomon, the wise king," and I think he's growing into that role. It's evident even in hip-hop. You see people who are Lil' this and Young that. What do they do? They act just like their name dictates."

== Awards and nominations ==
=== Grammy Awards ===
Year	Nominee / work	Award	Result
2005	Jesus Walks (as songwriter)	Song of the Year	Nominated
2005	Jesus Walks (as songwriter)	Best Rap Song	Won
2014	"New Slaves" (as songwriter)	Best Rap Song	Nominated
2016	Glory (as songwriter)	Best Rap Song	Nominated
2016	Glory (as songwriter)	Best Song Written for Visual Media	Won

== Discography ==
=== Albums ===
- 2006: Blue Collar
- 2010: El Che
- 2024: James & Nikki: A Conversation

=== Singles ===
- 1996: "This Is How We Chill (Pts. 1 & 2)"
- 2005: "Dirty Dirty" (Featuring Ol' Dirty Bastard)
- 2006: "Brand New" (featuring Kanye West) #38 Ireland, #32 UK
- 2006: "Dynomite (Going Postal)"
- 2006: "Fever"
- 2006: "Wanted"
- 2007: "Angry Black Man on the Elevator" (featuring Lil Jon)
- 2009: "Chicago"
- 2024: "Creator" (featuring Brittney Carter and Rell Suma)
- 2024: "Pop" (featuring EP Da Hellcat)

=== Mixtapes ===
- 2004: Brand New
- 2005: A Star Is Born, Vol. 1
- 2006: Plugg City: City on My Back
- 2008: Mark Ronson Presents: Man in the Mirror
- 2009: El Che: The Manual Mixtape
- 2010: Dangerous: 5-18
- 2010: Man in the Mirror 2.0
