= El Che (album) =

Studio album by Rhymefest
- Released: June 8, 2010
- Recorded: 2007–2010
- Genre: Hip-hop
- Length: 53:31
- Label: dNBe Entertainment, EMI; 8 9057500214 7
- Producer: S1; S1 and Caleb; Scram Jones; Terry Hunter; Best Kept Secret; Jimi Conway; Dub Sonata

Rhymefest chronology
Blue Collar (2006)	El Che (2010)

Professional ratings
Review scores
Source	Rating
Chicago Tribune	3/4 stars
Pitchfork	(6.9/10.0)
RapReviews.com	8.0/10 stars
Spin Magazine	4/5 stars
Chaundon.com	4/5 stars
thacorner.net	4/5 stars
DJBooth.net	3.5/5 stars

El Che is the second studio album by Chicago rapper Rhymefest, released on June 8, 2010. The album was released under dNBe Entertainment and EMI Records, who picked up the album after it was dropped by J Records as a result of creative differences.

Rhymefest recorded El Che at Soundscape Studios in Chicago, Illinois with Grammy-Award winning engineer/producer, Michael Kolar. Rhymefest utilized his UStream, and broadcast recording sessions live, chatting and replying to fans through his personal Twitter account.

== Track listing ==
The track listing was confirmed by Nah Right and Fake Shore Drive.

No.	Title	Producer(s)	Length
1.	"Intro: The Agent"		1:55
2.	"Talk My Shit"	Best Kept Secret	3:20
3.	"Say Wassup" (featuring Phonte)	S1 & Caleb	3:45
4.	"How High" (featuring Little Brother & Darien Brockington)	S1 & Caleb	3:51
5.	"Chocolates"	S1	3:33
6.	"One Hand Push Up"	S1	3:16
7.	"Prosperity"	Jimi Conway	3:17
8.	"Truth On You" (featuring Twone Gabz)	Terry Hunter	4:18
9.	"Intermission: Juan Carlos"		2:18
10.	"Chicago"	Scram Jones	3:34
11.	"Agony" (featuring Glenn Lewis)	Terry Hunter	4:42
12.	"Last Night"	Scram Jones	2:56
13.	"Give It To Me" (featuring ADaD & Saigon)	Scram Jones	3:08
14.	"Intermission: No Help"		0:39
15.	"City Is Falling" (featuring Slique)	BKS	4:54
16.	"Celebration"	Terry Hunter	4:05

Deluxe Edition bonus tracks
No.	Title	Producer(s)	Length
17.	"Vibin'"	Dub Sonata & Izaac Blaze	2:51
18.	"Goin' In" (featuring Queen Latifah)	Dub Sonata	3:45

== Charts ==
Chart (2010)	Peak position
U.S. Billboard Top R&B/Hip-Hop Albums	53
