= Chris Godbey =

American songwriter and vocal engineer

Christopher L. Godbey
- Born: Houston, Texas, United States
- Education: Baylor University
- Musical career
- Genres: R&B; hip hop; gospel; pop
- Occupations: Songwriter; Vocal engineer; vocal mixer; vocal mastering; producer
- Label: Earflower Inc.
- Website: earflower.net

Chris Godbey is an American songwriter, vocal engineer, producer, and mixer, best known for his frequent work with gospel artist Kirk Franklin (before working alongside producer Timbaland), including Grammy-winning albums Hero, The 20/20 Experience, BEYONCE, The Blueprint 3, Everything Is Love, and The Fight of My Life, among others. Godbey also co-wrote "Take It Easy On Me" from Robin Thicke's 2013 album Blurred Lines, "Walk It Out" from Jennifer Hudson's 2014 album JHUD, and "Yeah, I Said It" from Rihanna's 2016 album Anti.

== Career ==
Godbey, originally from Houston, began his music career as an instrumentalist in various Texas-area rock bands prior to attending Baylor University in 1993 to study telecommunications. While attending school, Godbey worked at a small studio in Waco, TX, before beginning employment with recording studio Dallas Sound Lab upon graduation. He began working with Kirk Franklin and several other gospel acts in Dallas, winning two Grammy Awards for Franklin's albums Hero in 2005 and The Fight of My Life in 2007 respectively, both in the Best Contemporary R&B Gospel Album category. In 2007, Godbey met producer Timbaland through mutual friends, subsequently mixing, engineering, or mastering records, as well as playing bass guitar or programming.

== Selected songwriting, programming and production credits ==
Credits are courtesy of Tidal and Spotify.

| Title | Year | Artist | Album |
|---|---|---|---|
| "Could've Been Me" | 2000 | Kirk Franklin | Kirk Franklin Presents 1NC |
| "Throw Yo Hands Up" | 2002 | Kirk Franklin | The Rebirth of Kirk Franklin |
| "Bukowski" (Congleton/Godbey Remix) | 2004 | Modest Mouse | Float On (AUS/UK CD Single, EUR Maxi-Single) |
| "Incredible" | 2004 | Anthony Evans | Even More |
| "Unity (We Stand)" (Featuring Kirk Franklin) | 2004 | Anthony Evans | Even More |
| "Imagine Me" | 2005 | Kirk Franklin | Hero |
| "Fascinated" (Featuring Justin Timberlake & Timbaland) | 2011 | FreeSol | Non-album single |
| "Hands In The Air" (Featuring Ne-Yo) | 2012 | Timbaland | Step Up Revolution: Music from the Motion Picture |
| "Break Ya Back" (Featuring Dev) | 2012 | Timbaland | Non-album single |
| "Take It Easy On Me" | 2013 | Robin Thicke | Blurred Lines |
| "I Don't Have to Sleep to Dream" | 2013 | Cher | Closer to the Truth |
| "Grown Woman" | 2013 | Beyoncé | Non-album single |
| "Walk It Out" (Featuring Timbaland) | 2014 | Jennifer Hudson | JHUD |
| "Movin’ Bass" (Featuring Jay-Z) | 2014 | Rick Ross | Hood Billionaire |
| "If They Knew" (Featuring K. Michelle) | 2014 | Rick Ross | Hood Billionaire |
| "Yeah, I Said It" | 2016 | Rihanna | Anti |
| "Dust My Shoulders Off" (Featuring Timbaland) | 2016 | Jane Zhang | Past Progressive |
| "Smile" (Featuring Timbaland) | 2016 | Yo Gotti | The Art of Hustle |
| "Too Much" (Featuring Timbaland) | 2018 | Zayn Malik | Icarus Falls |
| "Bow Down (Homecoming Live)" | 2019 | Beyoncé | Homecoming: The Live Album |
| "Have Mercy" | 2021 | Chlöe | Non-album single |
| "Keep Going Up" (With Nelly Furtado & Justin Timberlake) | 2023 | Timbaland | Textbook Timbo |

=== Full Mix, engineered and/or mastered projects ===
Albums with more than 80% Chris Godbey mixing/mastering/engineering credits, showing year released and album name
| Album | Artist | Year | Label |
|---|---|---|---|
| Kirk Franklin Presents 1NC | Kirk Franklin | 2000 | Interscope Records / MCA Records |
| Tha Absolute Truth | Big Tuck | 2006 | DSR / T-Town / Universal Music Group |
| Thirsty | Marvin Sapp | 2007 | Zomba / Verity Records |
| Shock Value II | Timbaland | 2009 | Mosley Music Group / Blackground Records |
| The 20/20 Experience | Justin Timberlake | 2013 | RCA Records |
| The 20/20 Experience – 2 of 2 | Justin Timberlake | 2013 | RCA Records |
| Man of the Woods | Justin Timberlake | 2018 | RCA Records |
| Iconology (EP) | Missy Elliott | 2019 | The Goldmind Inc. / Atlantic Records |
| In Pieces | Chlöe | 2023 | Parkwood / Columbia Records |
| Everything I Thought It Was | Justin Timberlake | 2024 | RCA Records |
| Resurrection | Chlöe & Timbaland | 2026 | Parkwood / Columbia Records |

== Awards and nominations ==
| Year | Ceremony | Award | Result | Ref |
|---|---|---|---|---|
| 2006 | 37th Annual GMA Dove Awards | Dove Award for Urban Album of the Year (Hero) | Won | |
| 2007 | 49th Annual Grammy Awards | Grammy Award for Best Contemporary R&B Gospel Album (Hero) | Won | |
| 2009 | 51st Annual Grammy Awards | Grammy Award for Best Contemporary R&B Gospel Album (The Fight of My Life) | Won | |
| 2015 | BMI R&B/Hip-Hop Awards | Most Performed R&B/Hip-Hop Songs ("Tom Ford") | Won | |
| 2015 | 57th Annual Grammy Awards | Grammy Award for Album of the Year (Beyoncé) | Nominated | |
