= Brand New (Rhymefest song) =

Single by Rhymefest featuring Kanye West

from the album Blue Collar
- Released: November 7, 2005
- Recorded: 2005
- Genre: Hip-hop
- Length: 3:40
- Label: J Records; Allido Records
- Songwriters: Che Smith; Kanye West; Gabriel Rich
- Producer: West

Rhymefest singles chronology
"Dirty Dirty" (2005)	"Brand New" (2005)	"Dynomite (Going Postal)" (2006)

Kanye West singles chronology
"Heard 'Em Say" (2005)	"Brand New" (2005)	"Touch the Sky" (2006)

"Brand New" is the first single from Rhymefest's debut album, Blue Collar, which features rapper and producer Kanye West. It is a hip-hop song, which charted in both Ireland and the United Kingdom in 2006. The music video was directed by DavMeyer.

== Background ==
The music video was released on October 5, 2005, and directed by Dave Meyers. Nick Cannon revealed to have ghostwrote part of West's verse in November 2016, but pointed out that West is a guy who's like: 'If somebody say something dope, let's get to it.'.

== Track listing ==
CD single (Europe)

1. "Brand New" (Radio) – 3:39
2. "Brand New" (Main) – 3:40
3. "Brand New" (Instrumental) – 3:39
4. "These Days" – 3:40
5. "Brand New" (Video) – 3:39

12" single (UK)

1. "Brand New" (Main) – 3:40
2. "Brand New" (Radio) – 3:39
3. "Brand New" (Instrumental) – 3:39

== Charts ==
Chart (2006)	Peak position
Ireland (IRMA)	11
UK Singles (Official Charts)	32
UK Hip Hop/R&B (Official Charts)	4
