= Kirk Franklin Presents: Songs for the Storm Vol. 1 =

Kirk Franklin Presents: Songs For The Storm Vol. 1

Compilation album by Kirk Franklin
- Released: November 7, 2006
- Genre: Urban contemporary gospel
- Length: 67:44
- Labels: Zomba Group, GospoCentric, Fo Yo Soul Entertainment

Kirk Franklin chronology
Hero (2005)	Kirk Franklin Presents: Songs For The Storm Vol. 1 (2006)	The Fight of My Life (2007)

Professional ratings
Review scores
Source	Rating
Allmusic	3/5 stars

Kirk Franklin Presents: Songs For The Storm Vol. 1 is a compilation album by Kirk Franklin. All songs are written and produced by Kirk Franklin.

== Track listing ==
#	Title	Time
1.	Intro	1:01
2.	He Will Take The Pain Away	8:38
3.	Let Me Touch You	5:23
4.	When I Get There	6:24
5.	Conquerors	8:24
6.	When You Fall	4:40
7.	Blessing In The Storm	3:29
8.	The Storm Is Over Now	5:47
9.	You Are	3:53
10.	The Family Worship Medley	7:48
11.	Melodies From Heaven	4:46
12.	Look At Me Now	4:59
