= The Gift of Love (Jennifer Hudson album) =

Studio album by Jennifer Hudson
- Released: October 18, 2024
- Genres: Christmas; gospel
- Length: 52:33
- Label: Interscope
- Producers: Dan Caplen; Brandon Collins; Andrew DeRoberts; David Foster; Kirk Franklin; John Gomez; Ron Hill; Jennifer Hudson; Justin Pearson; Greg Phillinganes; James Poyser; Ryan Tedder; Federico Vindver

Jennifer Hudson chronology
Respect (2021)	The Gift of Love (2024)

The Gift of Love is the fourth studio album by American singer Jennifer Hudson. It was released on October 18, 2024, by Interscope Records. Her first album since JHUD (2014), it features four original songs and ten covers of Christmas standards and carols, two are collaborations with The Joy and Common.

The album received a nomination for Best Traditional Pop Vocal Album at the 68th Annual Grammy Awards.

== Background and recording ==
After her third studio album JHUD, published in September 2014 through RCA Records, Hudson signed a record deal with Epic Records in June 2016. It was announced a new record project for the singer, under Clive Davis executive production, publishing the single. Despite the record deal, between 2016 and 2020 Hudson did not published an album, focusing on television and films. In December 2020 she collaborated on Mariah Carey single "Oh Santa!" with Ariana Grande. In 2021 she recorded Respect: Original Motion Picture Soundtrack through Epic Records and Metro-Goldwyn-Mayer Music, as the soundtrack album to the 2021 biographical film Respect in which Hudson acted as Aretha Franklin.

In August 2023, Hudson announced she was working on a new album during her talk show. In September 2024 Hudson announced her departure from Epic Records and subsequently announced she had signed a new deal with Interscope Records. Hudson began recording the album after her talk show went on hiatus for the summer. In an interview Hudson explained the decision to recorded a Christmas song album:

"I feel like it hasn’t been [a decade] because I sing through everything I do. Through films, commercials, different things, I have never stopped singing. So I didn’t notice that I hadn’t had an official Jennifer Hudson album. But time flies, especially when you’re busy and I’ve been a busy girl. [...] What better way to come back than a Christmas album? It’s been a dream of mine my whole career. I’m a holiday fanatic, so it just makes sense. [...] Holiday music, at least to me, is sentimental. So, like, "The Christmas Song", my grandmother loved this song, so it reminds me of my upbringing and the songs that my grandmother loved or that I used to hear around the house during the holidays"

== Promotions ==
The Gift of Love: An Intimate Live Experience, a tour in the United States which will begin November 24, 2024 in Brooklyn, New York City, and will end in Las Vegas on December 22, 2024.

== Critical reception ==
Professional ratings
Review scores
Source	Rating
AllMusic	4/5 stars

Andy Kellman of AllMusic wrote that the album "has all the trimmings that are to be expected from a holiday recording by a prominent powerhouse" with "tastefully ornate framework with lavish strings and brass, plus robust gospel choirs". Kellman appreciated both her performance in the classic Christmas songs and in the new co-written songs, highlighting "Almost Christmas" where there are "Common with Hudson enhancing the sentiments with graceful and romantic punctuation".

== Track listing ==
The Gift of Love track listing
No.	Title	Writer(s)	Producer(s)	Length
1.	"Hallelujah"	Leonard Cohen	Greg Phillinganes	6:45
2.	"Winter Wonderland"	Felix Bernard; Richard Smith	David Foster	2:21
3.	"Carol of the Bells" (featuring The Joy)	Mykola Leontovych; Peter Wilhousky; Jennifer Hudson	Brandon Collins; Ryan Tedder; Andrew DeRoberts	2:33
4.	"Find the Love"	Hudson; Dan Caplen; John Gomez	Caplen; Gomez; Tedder	2:56
5.	"O Holy Night"	Adolphe Adam; John Sullivan Dwight	Hudson; Gomez; Tedder	4:24
6.	"Make It to Christmas"	Hudson; Jacob Kasher Hindlin; Michael Pollack; Federico Vindver	Vindver	3:38
7.	"Santa for Someone"	Hudson; Kasher Hindlin; Pollack; Vindver	Vindver	3:23
8.	"My Favorite Things"	Oscar Hammerstein II; Richard Rodgers	Collins.; Tedder	3:36
9.	"Little Drummer Boy"	Katherine Kennicott Davis; Harry Simeone; Henry Onorati	Tedder	3:31
10.	"Go Tell It on the Mountain"	Hudson; Kirk Franklin; John Wesley Work Jr.	Franklin; Ron Hill; Justin Pearson	3:57
11.	"Almost Christmas" (featuring Common)	Hudson; Lonnie Rashid Lynn; Clement Clarke Moon; Paris Jones; James Poyser	Poyser	3:29
12.	"Jingle Bells (Prelude)"	James Lord Pierpont	Poyser	1:01
13.	"Jingle Bells"	Pierpont	Poyser	2:09
14.	"The Christmas Song"	Robert Wells; Mel Tormé	Foster	4:04
15.	"Auld Lang Syne"	Robert Burns	Greg Phillinganes	4:38

Bonus track
No.	Title	Writer(s)	Producer(s)	Length
16.	"Let There Be Joy"	Hudston; Collins; Josh Varnadore; Simon Oscroft	Collins; Oscroft	2:34
Total length:				55:07

Extended holiday edition – bonus track
No.	Title	Writer(s)	Producer(s)	Length
11.	"Mary Did You Know"	Mark Lowry; Buddy Greene	Phillinganes	3:42
Total length:				58:50

== Charts ==
Chart performance for The Gift of Love
Chart (2024)	Peak position
US Billboard 200	160
US Top Holiday Albums (Billboard)	10

== Release history ==
It's Christmas release history
Region	Date	Edition(s)	Format	Label	Ref(s)
Various	October 18, 2024	Standard	CD; digital download; streaming	JHUD Productions; Interscope	
Various	November 21, 2025	Extended holiday	CD; digital download; streaming	JHUD Productions; Interscope	
