= Respect (soundtrack) =

2021 soundtrack albums

Respect: Original Motion Picture Soundtrack

Soundtrack album by Jennifer Hudson
- Released: August 13, 2021
- Venues: Muscle Shoals, Alabama; Los Angeles, California
- Studios: Fame Recording Studios; Saturn Sound; The Light House; Westlake Studios
- Genres: Soul; R&B; gospel
- Length: 58:39
- Labels: Epic; MGM
- Producers: Stephen Bray; Jason Michael Webb; will.i.am; Johnny Goldstein

Jennifer Hudson chronology
JHUD (2014)	Respect: Original Motion Picture Soundtrack (2021)	The Gift of Love (2024)

Singles from Respect
- 1. "Here I Am (Singing My Way Home)" Released: June 18, 2021

Respect: Original Motion Picture Score

Film score by Kris Bowers
- Released: August 13, 2021
- Recorded: 2021
- Genres: Soul; classical
- Length: 12:56
- Label: Milan Records

Kris Bowers chronology
Space Jam: A New Legacy (2021)	Respect (2021)	King Richard (2021)

Respect: Original Motion Picture Soundtrack is the soundtrack album to the 2021 American film Respect, released coinciding with the film's theatrical release on August 13, 2021, by Epic Records and Metro-Goldwyn-Mayer Music. Based on the life of American singer Aretha Franklin, the film directed by Liesl Tommy, featured singer-actor Jennifer Hudson portraying Franklin. Hudson performed most of the tracks in the album. The soundtrack featured covers of Franklin's songs, and an original song "Here I Am (Singing My Way Home)" written by Hudson, Carole King, and Jamie Hartman and produced by will.i.am and Johnny Goldstein. It was released as a single on June 18, 2021, and had peaked at number 21 on the Billboard Adult R&B Songs chart. The soundtrack debuted at number 6 on Billboard Top Soundtracks chart. Respect: Original Motion Picture Score, the score album composed by Kris Bowers released on the same date as the film's soundtrack, by Milan Records.

== Background ==
The film's executive music producer, Stephen Bray, said in an interview to Billboard, stating that "From the beginning, the agreement was, 'Let's time travel to the degree we can in terms of recreating these iconic sessions for songs like 'I Never Loved a Man" and "Respect' and 'Ain't No Way.' Let's do the best we can at making it look and sound exactly like it may have back in 1967 or '68.' Super music nerd that I am, I had the time of my life. I would have done it for free. I'm lucky I got hired to do it. It's the most fun I've ever had working." He referred to several documentaries and television shows based on Franklin's life for his research.

To get into the sounds, representing the 1960s, Bray collected vintage Neumann U-47 and U-48 microphones, as well as specific drum kits. He joined with executive music producer Jason Michael Webb, to supervise the soundtrack, and brought Charles Chalmers, a recurrent saxophonist for Franklin, to play for the cover versions of the soundtrack. While the singing was done live on sets, the instrumentation process happened remotely due to the COVID-19 pandemic, where all musicians had to record in their own homes. Bray added "Liesl [Tommy] made it a point to bring in people who can really sing live. That helped us a lot in post (production). We didn't have to worry about doing all that vocal subbing you see in a lot of these kinds of movies."

Hudson apart from singing, also played piano for this film, who attributed on Franklin's connection and influence she had in her life. Speaking to Los Angeles Times, Tommy said "Aretha was capable of so much power when she sings and so much delicacy and nuance. I wanted the way that we feel listening to her music to be the way that we felt watching the film. Another thing that guided me is that she has so much emotion in her singing. I felt that the film should be emotional too because that's who she was. And even though she was very protective of her private life, her private life is all over her music."

== Reception ==
BroadwayWorld's Courtney Savoia wrote "This soundtrack wonderfully succeeds at bringing the music of Aretha Franklin to new generations through the incredibly talented, Jennifer Hudson. It's a beautiful way to bridge the music of past and present and celebrate strong women relating to and inspiring others." Writing for AllMusic, Andy Kellman said "Lesser singers would likely attempt imitation and undoubtedly fall short. Hudson is among the few who could pull it off. Instead, the powerhouse seems to glean her own past as much as that of her subject, and though she nails some of the queen's mannerisms and inflections—especially when the material calls for elation and assertion her voice remains singular. Performances of three songs from the outstanding live gospel album Amazing Grace (1972) don't have the same sense of urgency, and the crowd noise on "Respect" is jarringly disconnected. More often, however, these renderings glow and do right by the queen. Hudson, whose recordings since JHUD (2014) have been scattered in terms of purpose, style, and quality, hasn't sounded this inspired in some time." The Musical Hype gave 4 out of 5 to the soundtrack, saying "Covering an untouchable icon is a tall task, even for a singer as gifted as Jennifer Hudson. All in all, she does an awesome job. On Respect, she does her job – capturing the essence of the icon. Is Respect perfect? By no means, nor would anybody expect it to be. There was and always will be only ONE Queen of Soul. That said, I give mad props to Hudson, who gives her all and very best song after song."

== Track listing ==
Respect: Original Motion Picture Soundtrack
No.	Title	Writer(s)	Length
1.	"There is a fountain filled with blood"	William Cowper, Lowell Mason	2:53
2.	"Ac-Cent-Tchu-Ate the Positive"	Harold Arlen, Johnny Mercer	2:20
3.	"Nature Boy"	Eden Ahbez	3:13
4.	"I Never Loved a Man (The Way I Love You)"	Ronnie Shannon	3:56
5.	"Do Right Woman, Do Right Man"	Chips Moman, Dan Penn	3:13
6.	"Dr. Feelgood"	Aretha Franklin, Ted White	3:24
7.	"Respect"	Otis Redding	3:42
8.	"(Sweet Sweet Baby) Since You've Been Gone"	Aretha Franklin, Ted White	2:26
9.	"Ain't No Way"	Carolyn Franklin	4:16
10.	"(You Make Me Feel Like A) Natural Woman"	Gerry Goffin, Carole King, Jerry Wexler	3:07
11.	"Chain of Fools"	Don Covay	2:29
12.	"Think"	Aretha Franklin, Ted White	1:49
13.	"Take My Hand, Precious Lord"	Rev. Thomas A. Dorsey	2:18
14.	"Spanish Harlem"	Jerry Leiber, Phil Spector	3:38
15.	"I Say a Little Prayer"	Burt Bacharach, Hal David	3:41
16.	"Precious Memories"	J.B.F. Wright	1:57
17.	"Amazing Grace"	Traditional	5:03
18.	"Here I Am (Singing My Way Home)"	Jamie Hartman, Jennifer Hudson, Carole King	5:14
Total length:			58:39

All music is composed by Kris Bowers.

Respect: Original Motion Picture Score
No.	Title	Length
1.	"Run After Mamma"	0:39
2.	"Trauma"	1:14
3.	"You Ain't Goin' Nowhere"	1:30
4.	"I Waited Too Long For This"	0:47
5.	"Aretha Returns Home"	1:10
6.	"Why Mamma Left"	1:03
7.	"Angela Davis"	1:19
8.	"You Are Shaking"	0:51
9.	"Aretha Collapses"	2:36
10.	"Forgiveness"	1:44
Total length:		12:56

== Charts ==
Chart (2021)	Peak position
Swiss Albums (Schweizer Hitparade)	93
UK Album Downloads (Official Charts)	33
UK Soundtrack Albums (Official Charts)	6
US Billboard 200	151
US Soundtrack Albums (Billboard)	2
US Top R&B Albums (Billboard)	16

== Accolades ==
Year	Award organization	Category	Recipient	Result	Ref.
2021	12th Hollywood Music in Media Awards	Best Original Song in a Feature Film	"Here I Am (Singing My Way Home)" – Jamie Hartman, Jennifer Hudson, Carole King	Nominated	
2021	12th Hollywood Music in Media Awards	Best Original Song – Onscreen Performance	"Respect" – Jennifer Hudson, Hailey Kilgore, Saycon Sengbloh	Nominated	
2022	22nd Black Reel Awards	Outstanding Original Song	"Here I Am (Singing My Way Home)" – Jamie Hartman, Jennifer Hudson, Carole King	Nominated	
2022	22nd Black Reel Awards	Outstanding Original Score	Kris Bowers	Nominated	
2022	79th Golden Globe Awards	Best Original Song	"Here I Am (Singing My Way Home)" – Jamie Hartman, Jennifer Hudson, Carole King	Nominated	
2022	64th Annual Grammy Awards	Best Compilation Soundtrack for Visual Media	Respect	Nominated	
2022	64th Annual Grammy Awards	Best Song Written for Visual Media	"Here I Am (Singing My Way Home)" – Jamie Hartman, Jennifer Hudson, Carole King	Nominated	
2022	53rd NAACP Image Awards	Outstanding Soundtrack/Compilation Album	Stephen Bray, Jason Michael Webb	Nominated	
2022	26th Satellite Awards	Best Original Song	"Here I Am (Singing My Way Home)" – Jamie Hartman, Jennifer Hudson, Carole King	Nominated	
