= JHUD =

Studio album by Jennifer Hudson
- Released: September 23, 2014
- Length: 43:43
- Label: RCA
- Producers: Jim Beanz; Jerry "Wonda" Duplessis; Gorgon City; Terry Hunter; J-Roc; Keyz; Stephen Kozmeniuk; Mali Music; Andrea Martin; Nineteen85; Timbaland; Pharrell Williams

Jennifer Hudson chronology
I Remember Me (2011)	JHUD (2014)	Respect (2021)

Singles from JHUD
- 1. "I Can't Describe (The Way I Feel)" Released: September 24, 2013; 2. "Walk It Out" Released: April 28, 2014; 3. "It's Your World" Released: July 8, 2014; 4. "I Still Love You" Released: June 4, 2015

JHUD is the third studio album by American entertainer Jennifer Hudson. It was released on September 23, 2014, by RCA Records, serving as the follow-up to I Remember Me (2011). It was Hudson's first and only album released through RCA following the closure of Arista and J Records. For the album, the singer pursued a new artistic direction, collaborating with producers including Pharrell Williams, Jerry "Wonda" Duplessis, Gorgon City, and Timbaland to create a more personal and energetic sound that reflected her development as an artist. Hudson herself co-wrote on two tracks included on the final album.

The album received generally favorable reviews, with critics praising Hudsons powerful vocals while noting that some of the material and songwriting were inconsistent. The album debuted at number 10 on the US Billboard 200 with 24,000 first-week sales, marking a significant decline from her previous albums I Remember Me and Jennifer Hudson (2008). RCA Records issued several singles in promotion of the album, including "I Can't Describe (The Way I Feel)", "Walk It Out", and "It's Your World"; however, none of the singles made a significant impact on the charts.

== Background ==
In March 2011, Hudson released her second album I Remember Me. As with her self-titled début, Hudson worked with many different producers and songwriters on the project, resulting in a "feel good album". Upon release, it debuted at number two on the US Billboard 200 chart, with first-week sales of 165,000 copies, and was eventually certified gold by the Recording Industry Association of America (RIAA), for shipping over 500,000 copies in the United States. While not as successful as previous releases, lead single "Where You At" became a top-ten hit on the Hot R&B/Hip-Hop Songs chart, though subsequent singles failed to chart or sell noticeably.

After a short musical hiatus, in which she co-starred in the films The Three Stooges (2012), The Inevitable Defeat of Mister & Pete (2013), and Black Nativity (2013), Hudson returned to music recording in mid-2013. Heading for a different direction, Hudson consulted new producers to work with her on her third album: "It's different expressions of me as an artist, a girl, a music lover. Earlier in my career I was just a soloist singing other people's songs. Now I really want to be an artist. I want to lift the people up, have fun, create a moment. I have my own visions that I want to bring to life." On the developing process of her third album, she elaborated in November 2013: "I've been working with Pharrell Williams quite a bit on my album, and Timbaland as well. This whole project this time around is extremely different and every session felt like a party, like we was getting our jam on."

== Promotion ==
The promotion for JHUD began with lead single "I Can't Describe (The Way I Feel)," produced by Pharrell Williams and featuring rapper T.I.. An uptempo dance track influenced by the sounds of the 1970s and 1980s, the song was originally intended for Miley Cyrus during sessions for her album Bangerz, but it was ultimately not completed or included on the album. It achieved modest chart success, reaching number 20 on the UK R&B Singles Chart. The album's second single, the Timbaland-produced "Walk It Out," was released on April 29, 2014. It reached number 22 on the US Adult R&B Songs chart.

The album's third single "It's Your World" featuring R. Kelly, was released on July 8, 2014. The song performed moderately well on the charts, reaching number 11 on the US Adult R&B Songs chart and number 3 on the US Dance Club Songs chart, and received a nomination for Best R&B Performance at the 57th Annual Grammy Awards. In 2019, following the release of the documentary Surviving R. Kelly, "It's Your World" was removed from digital editions of the album, although it was later restored. On August 18, 2014, Hudson released JHUD''s opening track "Dangerous" as a promotional single through her Vevo and SoundCloud accounts. The visuals for another single, "I Still Love You", a collboration with garage duo Gorgon City, premiered as part of Logo's #All50 marriage-equality campaign and were nominated for Best Video with a Message at the 2015 MTV Video Music Awards.

== Critical reception ==
Professional ratings
Aggregate scores
Source	Rating
Metacritic	68/100
Review scores
Source	Rating
AllMusic	4/5 stars
Billboard	4/5 stars
New York Daily News	3/4 stars
The Observer	3/5 stars
Rolling Stone	3/5 stars
Slant Magazine	2/5 stars

JHUD received generally favorable reviews from music critics, some of whom praised Hudson's powerful vocals and her ability to blend contemporary R&B, disco, and house music, while some felt that the material did not always match her vocal strengths. On Metacritic, which assigns a normalized rating out of 100 to reviews from critics, the album received an average score of 68, based on six reviews. Billboard editor Elias Leight remarked that "the spare templates [Hudson] uses here, which are heavy on rhythm and relatively empty otherwise, give her plenty of space to flex her powerful voice." Writing for AllMusic, Andy Kellman forecasting Hudson to be "in full-on diva mode" even though she "occasionally sounds disconnected from the material, but the singer, as powerful as ever, still leaves her indelible mark on everything". Rolling Stone's Christopher R. Weingarten similarly praised Hudson's vocal range, comparing her performances to those of Thelma Houston, Gloria Gaynor, and CeCe Peniston.

Other critics were more reserved about the album's songwriting and consistency. Theo Leanse, writing for The Observer, felt that while "there are highs [and] lows [and] there's always a gooey pleasure to hearing her sing, but you'd hope someone launched through gospel to the American Idol finals and an Oscar win might find better material in an R&B world thundering with great songwriters." Slant Magazine's Andrew Chan argued that although the album attempts to shift Hudson toward a more club-oriented sound, its production often feels formulaic and lacks emotional depth. He praised "He Ain't Going Nowhere" and the closing ballad "Moan" as highlights, but criticized the album's repetitive grooves, limited vocal variety, and uninspired songwriting overall. Melanie J. Sims of the Associated Press praised Hudson's vocals but argued that the album lacks a distinctive personal style. She found several tracks enjoyable, but felt Hudson was conforming to personas and sounds that did not feel authentic to her. New York Daily News editor Jim Farber found that much of JHUD's "material sounds like it was fished out of the slush pile of hotter stars like Beyoncé or Nicki Minaj."

== Commercial performance ==
JHUD debuted at number 10 on the US Billboard 200, selling 24,000 copies in its first week. This marked Hudson's lowest first-week sales and chart debut for a studio album, representing a significant decline from I Remember Me (2011), which had opened with 165,000 copies sold. 'JHUD nevertheless debuted at number two on the Top R&B/Hip-Hop Albums chart, becoming Hudson's third consecutive album to reach the position. Yahoo! Music's Paul Grein attributed the album's relatively weak opening sales in part to the underperformance of its singles, noting that none of its first three singles reached the top 20 on the R&B chart. By December 2014, JHUD had sold 61,000 copies in the United States.

== Track listing ==
JHUD track listing
No.	Title	Writer(s)	Producer(s)	Length
1.	"Dangerous"	Paul Jefferies; Daniel Daley; Stephen Kozmeniuk; Vanessa Kalala; Zale Epstein	Nineteen85; Kozmeniuk; Jim Beanz^{[a]}	4:15
2.	"It's Your World" (featuring R. Kelly)	Robert Kelly; Terry Hunter	Hunter; Harvey Mason Jr.^{[a]}	5:16
3.	"He Ain't Goin' Nowhere" (featuring Iggy Azalea)	Pharrell Williams; Amethyst Kelly	Williams	3:46
4.	"Walk It Out" (featuring Timbaland)	Jennifer Hudson; Timothy Mosley; Jerome Harmon; Mike Tompkins; Lyrica Anderson; Jacob Luttrell; Chris Godbey; Jim Beanz	Timbaland; J-Roc; Beanz^{[a]}	4:43
5.	"I Can't Describe" (featuring T.I.)	Williams; Clifford Harris	Williams	3:46
6.	"I Still Love You"	Andrea Martin; David Taylor; Kye Gibbon; Matthew Robson-Scott	Gorgon City; Martin; Mason Jr.^{[a]}	3:44
7.	"Just That Type of Girl"	Williams	Williams	3:53
8.	"Bring Back the Music"	Kortney Pollard; Jerry "Wonda" Duplessis; Arden "Keyz" Altino	Duplessis; Mali Music; Altino^{[b]}	3:55
9.	"Say It"	Pollard; Duplessis; Altino	Duplessis; Mali Music; Altino^{[b]}	3:41
10.	"Moan"	Pollard; Hudson; David Jackson	Mali Music; Hudson	6:53

JHUD – Japan edition and digital reissue (bonus track)
No.	Title	Writer(s)	Producer(s)	Length
11.	"Never Give It Up"	Williams	Williams	3:37

Notes

- ^{^[a]} signifies a vocal producer
- ^{^[b]} signifies a co-producer

== Personnel ==
Credits adapted from the liner notes of JHUD.

Performers and musicians

- Jennifer Hudson – lead vocals, background vocals
- R. Kelly – featured artist (2)
- Iggy Azalea – featured artist (3)
- Timbaland – featured artist (4)
- T.I. – featured artist (5)
- Swiss Chris – drums (8)
- Daniel Daley – background vocals (1)
- Akene "The Champ" Dunkley – keyboards (8–9)
- "Jigga" James Edwards – additional keyboards (2)
- Gorgon City – synths (6), piano (6), strings (6), bass (6)
- Jamale Hopkins – drums (9)
- David Jackson – keyboards (10)
- Stephen Kozmeniuk – keyboards (1), drums (1)
- Vanessa Lu – background vocals (1)
- Mali Music – background vocals (8), instrumentation (10)
- Nineteen85 – guitar (1), bass (1), drums (1)
- Brent Paschka – electric guitar (3)
- Brandyn Porter – guitar (9)
- Phil Seed – guitar (2)
- Mike Tompkins – additional vocals (4)
- Robert Aaron Vineberg – saxophone (9)

Production

- Arden "Keyz" Altino – co-production (8–9)
- Matt Bang – recording (4)
- Jim Beanz – vocal production (1, 4), recording (1)
- Noel "Gadget" Campbell – mixing (1)
- Andrew Coleman – recording (3, 5, 7), digital editing (3, 5, 7), digital arrangement (3, 5, 7)
- Jacob Dennis – recording assistant (3, 5)
- Matthew Desrameaux – recording assistant (3, 5)
- Jerry "Wonda" Duplessis – production (8–9)
- Peter Edge – executive production
- Joey "BDB" Fernandez – recording (2)
- Serban Ghenea – mixing (5)
- Chris Godbey – recording (4), mixing (4)
- Gorgon City – production (6), drum programming (6)
- Hart Gunther – recording (3), recording assistant (7)
- Mick Guzauski – mixing (3, 7–8, 10)
- John Hanes – engineering for mix (5)
- Jerome "J-Roc" Harmon – production (4)
- Andrew Hey – vocal recording (2, 6)
- Jennifer Hudson – production (10)
- Terry Hunter – production (2), arrangement (2)
- Todd Hurtt – recording assistant (3, 5)
- Jaycen Joshua – mixing (2)
- Ryan Kaul – mixing assistant (2)
- R. Kelly – additional arrangement (2)
- Stephen Kozmeniuk – production (1), recording (1)
- Dave Kutch – mastering
- Jonathan Lackey – recording assistant (6, 10)
- Mike Larson – recording (5, 7)
- Mat Lejeune – recording (10)
- Mali Music – production (8–10)
- Andrea Martin – production (6)
- Harvey Mason Jr. – vocal production (2, 6)
- Keith Naftaly – executive production
- Nineteen85 – production (1)
- Ramon Rivas – recording assistant (7)
- Damien Smith – executive production
- Mark "Spike" Stent – mixing (6)
- Rob Suchecki – recording assistant (4)
- Timbaland – production (4)
- Serge "Sergical" Tsai – recording (8–9), mixing (9)
- Pharrell Williams – production (3, 5, 7)

Design and management

- Eric Archibald – styling
- Fusako Chubachi – art direction
- Yolonda Frederick – make-up
- Edwin Gorostiza – art direction
- Shawn Holiday – A&R
- Anthony Mandler – photography
- Cesar Ramirez – hair
- Damien Smith – management

== Charts ==
=== Weekly charts ===
Weekly chart performance for JHUD
Chart (2014)	Peak position
Japanese Albums (Oricon)	170
South Korean International Albums (Circle)	59
Swiss Albums (Schweizer Hitparade)	100
UK Albums (Official Charts)	116
UK R&B Albums (Official Charts)	10
US Billboard 200	10
US Top R&B/Hip-Hop Albums (Billboard)	2

=== Year-end charts ===
Year-end chart performance for JHUD
Chart (2014)	Position
US Top R&B/Hip-Hop Albums (Billboard)	58
