= The Fight of My Life =

Studio album by Kirk Franklin
- Released: December 18, 2007
- Recorded: 2006–2007
- Genre: Urban contemporary gospel
- Length: 76:54
- Label: GospoCentric
- Producer: Kirk Franklin, James "Jazzy" Jordan, Carla Williams, Jessie Hurst

Kirk Franklin chronology
Songs For The Storm: Volume 1 (2006)	The Fight of My Life (2007)	Hello Fear (2011)

Professional ratings
Review scores
Source	Rating
AllMusic	4/5 stars
Gospelflava.com	(favorable)
BlogCritics magazine	(favorable)
Rhapsody Online	(not rated)

The Fight of My Life is the ninth album by gospel singer Kirk Franklin, released on GospoCentric Records.

== Background ==
Produced by Franklin, James "Jazzy" Jordan, Carla Williams and Jessie Hurst, the album features songs with several urban contemporary gospel, Christian hip hop and Contemporary Christian artists including tobyMac, Rance Allen, Isaac Carree, Doug Williams, Melvin Williams, Da’ T.R.U.T.H., and Donovan Owens. It is the 10th studio album by Franklin and his 11th North American album. The U.S. release on GospoCentric Records occurred on December 18, 2007. The album debuted on the Billboard 200 at #33 with 74,000 copies sold in the first week.

== Track listing ==
All tracks composed by Kirk Franklin except where noted.

#	Title	Time	Notes
1.	"Intro"	0:25	Spoken word by Kirk Franklin
2.	"Declaration (This is It)"	4:24	Music composed by Kenny Loggins and Michael McDonald
3.	"Little Boy" (featuring Rance Allen and Isaac Carree)	5:07	
4.	"Help Me Believe"	6:51	2009 Grammy Award winner ("Best Gospel Song")
5.	"Hide Me"	5:14	
6.	"How It Used to Be"	4:53	
7.	"He Will Supply"	4:26	
8.	"Jesus"	3:43	
9.	"I Am God" (featuring tobyMac)	5:05	
10.	"It Would Take All Day"	5:11	
11.	"A Whole Nation" (featuring Donovan Owens)	4:59	
12.	"Still in Love"	5:19	
13.	"I Like Me" (featuring Da’ T.R.U.T.H.)	3:05	Music composed by Kirk Franklin and Emmanual Lambert
14.	"Chains"	7:28	
15.	"Still (in Control)" (featuring Doug Williams and Melvin Williams)	5:12	
16.	"The Last Jesus"	5:32	

== Personnel ==
=== Vocalists ===
- Nikki Ross
- Anaysha Figueroa
- Ashley Guilbert
- Charmaine Swimpson
- Eric Moore
- Isaac Carree
- Joy Hill
- Faith Anderson
- Sheri Jones-Moffett
- Melonie Daniels
- Candy West
- Jana Bell
- Melodie Davis
- Myron Butler
- Anthony Evans
- Deonis Cook
- Ryan Edgar

=== Musicians ===
- Kirk Franklin – keyboards, programming, piano, claps
- Shaun Martin – keyboards, programming, piano, drums, percussion, claps, vocals
- Robert "Sput" Searight – drums
- Jerome Harmon – keyboards, Hammond B3, programming
- Doc Powell – lead guitar, Acoustic guitar
- Jonathan David Wyatt – keyboards, Hammond B3
- Ayron Lewis – Hammond B3
- Tre Nagella – drum programming, guitar
- Rodney Lawson – lead guitar
- Keith Taylor – bass guitar
- Pablo Batista – percussion
- Terry Baker – drums, percussion
- Brian Haley – drums
- Todd Lawton – bass guitar
- Tim Rosenau – lead guitar
- Ernie G – DJ
- Todd Parsnow – lead guitar
- Braylon Lacy – Upright bass guitar
- Ric Robbins – DJ
- Lloyd Barry – trumpet
- Vinnie Ciesielski – trumpet
- Roy Agee – trombone
- Joe Johnson – saxophone
- Doug Moffet – saxophone
- Matt Cappy – trumpet
- Carl Cox – saxophone
- Jeff Bradshaw – trombone

=== Orchestra ===
- Emma Kummrow – violin
- Igor Szwec – violin
- Olga Konopelsky – violin
- Ghislaine Fleischmann – violin
- Charles Parker – violin
- Gregory Teperman – violin
- Luigi Mazzocchi – violin
- Robert Martin – violin
- H.S. Alexandra Leem – viola
- Peter Nocella – viola
- Jennie Lorenzo – cello

== Charts ==
=== Weekly charts ===
Chart (2007–08)	Peak position
US Billboard 200	33
US Top Christian Albums (Billboard)	1
US Top Gospel Albums (Billboard)	1
US Top R&B/Hip-Hop Albums (Billboard)	7

=== Year-end charts ===
Chart (2008)	Position
US Billboard 200	133
US Christian Albums (Billboard)	4
US Top Gospel Albums (Billboard)	2
US Top R&B/Hip-Hop Albums (Billboard)	37

Chart (2009)	Position
US Top Gospel Albums (Billboard)	23

=== Single ===
Year	Song title	Chart	Peak
2007	"Declaration (This is It)"	Hot R&B/Hip-Hop Songs	35

== Certifications ==
Region	Certification	Certified units/sales
United States (RIAA)	Gold	500,000^{‡}
^{‡} Sales+streaming figures based on certification alone.

== Accolades ==
=== Wins ===
- 40th GMA Dove Awards: Urban Album of the Year
- 51st Grammy Awards: Best Contemporary R&B Gospel Album
- 51st Grammy Awards: Best Gospel Song ("Help Me Believe")

=== Nominations ===
- 40th GMA Dove Awards: Urban Recorded Song of the Year ("Declaration (This Is It)")
