= I Remember Me (album) =

Studio album by Jennifer Hudson
- Released: March 22, 2011
- Recorded: 2009–2011
- Genre: R&B
- Length: 43:32
- Labels: Arista; J
- Producers: Alicia Keys; Chuck Harmony; Rich Harrison; Hit-Boy; R. Kelly; Harvey Mason Jr.; Ne-Yo; Polow da Don; Salaam Remi; SlipMats; Stargate; Swizz Beatz; Ryan Tedder; Noel Zancanella

Jennifer Hudson chronology
Jennifer Hudson (2008)	I Remember Me (2011)	JHUD (2014)

Singles from I Remember Me
- 1. "Where You At" Released: February 8, 2011; 2. "I Remember Me" Released: April 3, 2011; 3. "No One Gonna Love You" Released: May 24, 2011; 4. "I Got This" Released: October 30, 2011

I Remember Me is the second studio album by American singer and actress Jennifer Hudson, released on March 22, 2011, by Arista Records. Hudson worked with a variety of producers and writers on the album, including Alicia Keys, Rich Harrison, Ne-Yo, R. Kelly, Harvey Mason Jr., Ryan Tedder, Diane Warren, and among others.

The album debuted at number two on the US Billboard 200, selling 165,000 copies in its first week and was certified gold by the Recording Industry Association of America (RIAA) in the United States. It received positive reviews from music critics.

== Background ==
Hudson herself announced on Twitter in September 2009 that she would begin the process of her second studio album. Hudson mentioned to Billboard that she wanted her second album to be more personal than her debut and expressed that she wanted to become more hands on with the project. Hudson told InStyle magazine that she wanted this album to be a "feel good" album. She quoted "I wanted to take it to the next level in every way-from the image to the music to the subjects of the songs".

I Remember Me was recorded at various recording studios, namely Maximedia Recording Studio in Dallas, Instrument Zoo in Miami, Chicago Recording Company and The Chocolate Factory in Chicago, Germano Studios, Oven Studios, and Roc The Mic Studios in New York City, Mason Sound and Vanilla Sky Studios in North Hollywood, No Excuses Studios in Santa Monica, and Patriot Studios in Denver. Songwriter Diane Warren revealed to E! in January 2011 that she penned a new song for Hudson titled "Still Here". However, the song first appeared in the UK version of Natasha Bedingfield's 2007 second album, N.B..

== Promotion ==
On January 24, 2011 Hudson premiered the album's lead single "Where You At". It was written by R. Kelly and produced by Harvey Mason Jr. The song went for radio adds that same week. On February 3, 2011 due to radio adds the single made its debut on the US Billboard Hot R&B/Hip-Hop Songs chart at number 53, having so far reached a peak of number 10. The music video premiered on BET's 106 & Park and through Vevo on February 24, 2011.

The title track was released as the album's lead single in the United Kingdom on April 3, 2011. It has peaked at number eighty-nine on the UK Singles Chart. "No One Gonna Love You" impacted on Urban adult contemporary radio in the United States on May 24, 2011. A remix bundle titled "No One Gonna Love You-The Remixes" was released as a digital download in the US and the UK on July 13, 2011. The song reached number 23 on the Hot R&B/Hip-Hop Songs. The third U.S. single was "I Got This".

Non-single track "Don't Look Down" reached number 70 on the US Hot R&B/Hip-Hop Songs chart.

== Critical reception ==
Professional ratings
Review scores
Source	Rating
Allmusic	4.5/5 stars
Chicago Sun-Times	3/4 stars
Entertainment Weekly	B+
The Guardian	3/5 stars
Los Angeles Times	2.5/4 stars
Rolling Stone	3/5 stars
Slant Magazine	2.5/5 stars
USA Today	3.5/4 stars

I Remember Me received generally positive reviews from music critics. At Metacritic, which assigns a normalized rating out of 100 to reviews from mainstream critics, the album received an average score of 68, based on 15 reviews. Simon Price of The Independent stated "while she unquestionably has a voice, the material's nothing you'll want to remember". Genevieve Koski of The A.V. Club wrote that the album "can occasionally get a touch exhausting in its relentless emoting", but complimented its "empowered (and empowering) anthems that inevitably climax with Hudson’s vocal fireworks", but viewed that most of its songs "deserve such bravado" in "cranking her performance to 11 regardless of whether any given song warrants it". Despite writing that "Hudson is still searching for songs to do right by her voice", Allison Stewart of The Washington Post found its "pretty-good assortment of R&B songs" an improvement over her previous album and wrote that Hudson "dispatches even the most technically difficult tracks as if she were swatting away flies, her unblinking confidence reminiscent of Adele". Elysa Gardner of USA Today gave the album three-and-a-half out of four stars and stated "Even when the material [...] flirts with the banal, Hudson's unmannered strength and class shine through, as surely as the technical prowess she wields with confidence and discretion".

Allmusic editor Andy Kellman gave it four-and-a-half out of five stars and praised Hudson's performance and her collaborators' contributions, writing that they both "provide the kind of mature R&B that is not felt merely in the mind, throat, chest, or hips but the entire body". Entertainment Weekly's Mikael Wood gave I Remember Me a B+ rating and complimented its "lighter vibe". Chicago Sun-Times writer Thomas Conner noted its songs as "mid-tempo" and complimented their "deft and delicate rhythmic elements". Ken Capobianco of The Boston Globe found its songs "stronger, and Hudson sounds more poised" than on her debut album. Rolling Stone writer Jody Rosen gave the album three out of five stars and commented that "Sonically, the record is up-to-the-minute; in spirit it's a throwback to the adult-oriented R&B of Anita Baker, Toni Braxton and Whitney Houston". Giving the album four out of five stars, New York Daily News writer Jim Farber praised her singing's focus and commented that "If the material at hand doesn't always provide that style with its ideal vehicle, Hudson's voice makes up for that with an ideal balance of feeling and force".

However, Kevin Ritchie of NOW commented that "Hudson's stratospheric voice [...] overflows with emotion, and subtlety's in short supply". Slant Magazine's Matthew Cole viewed that its material as unoriginal and stated "most of the album's hooks contain gratuitous overdubs, and when Hudson is allowed to take the spotlight, she's liable to overcook the vocal melodies in the pandering, applause-line style that every American Idol competitor learns to live by". Noting "filler songs" as "frequent", Natalie Shaw of MusicOMH gave the album three out of five stars and commented that Hudson's singing "merits something different to many of the by-numbers songs", adding that "subtlety in places would have made for a more rounded album than the blustering, galeforce power that overwhelms most of I Remember Me's arrangements". Mojo gave the album two out of five stars and stated "She's simply not being fed the right material, or getting to work with a sympathetic producer. Hudson is a soul singer not a modern R'n'B one". Los Angeles Times writer Evelyn McDonnell commented that her "big, warm, church-trained R&B diva voice [...] has never seemed comfortable among the bright shiny toys of a pop studio". Carolie Sullivan of The Guardian wrote that "the album ends with overblown ballads", but concluded that "the first three-quarters are heartlifting indeed".

The album also won the NAACP Image Award for Outstanding Album at the 43rd NAACP Image Awards. It was also nominated for Top R&B Album at the 2012 Billboard Music Awards.

== Commercial performance ==
I Remember Me debuted at number two on the Billboard 200 chart, with first-week sales of 165,000 copies in the United States. In its second week, the album sold 56,000 copies and dropped to number seven on the Billboard 200. On April 25, 2011, the album was certified gold by the RIAA, for shipping over 500,000 copies in the US. As of September 2014, the album has sold 459,000 copies in the United States.

In Germany, the album debuted at No. 84, making it Hudson's first studio album to chart in that country.

== Track listing ==
I Remember Me track listing
No.	Title	Writer(s)	Producer(s)	Length
1.	"No One Gonna Love You"	Rich Harrison	Harrison; Harvey Mason Jr.^{[A]}	3:48
2.	"I Got This"	Tor Erik Hermansen; Mikkel Erikssen; Crystal Johnson; Mats Lie Skåre	StarGate; SlipMats^{[B]}; Mason^{[A]}	3:22
3.	"Where You At"	Robert Kelly	R. Kelly; Mason^{[A]}	3:47
4.	"Angel"	Alicia Keys	Swizz Beatz; Keys	3:29
5.	"I Remember Me"	Jennifer Hudson; Ryan Tedder	Tedder; Noel Zancanella^{[C]}; Mason^{[A]}	4:10
6.	"Gone"	Ester Dean; Chauncey Hollis; Jamal Jones	Polow da Don; Hit-Boy; Mason^{[A]}	3:38
7.	"Everybody Needs Love"	Keys; Kasseem Dean; Tony Macaulay	Swizz Beatz; Keys	3:14
8.	"Why Is It So Hard"	Shaffer Smith; Charles Harmon	Ne-Yo; Chuck Harmony; Mason^{[A]}	3:46
9.	"Don't Look Down"	Keys; Salaam Remi	Keys; Remi	3:23
10.	"Still Here"	Diane Warren	Mason	3:41
11.	"Feeling Good"	Anthony Newley; Leslie Bricusse	Remi	2:16
12.	"Believe"	Ronnie Dunn; Craig Wiseman	Mason	4:58
Total length:				43:32

UK/Germany bonus tracks
No.	Title	Writer(s)	Producer(s)	Length
5.	"I Remember Me" (Radio Mix)	Hudson; Ryan Tedder	Tedder; Ash Howes	3:34
13.	"Spotlight"	Eriksen; Hermansen; Smith	StarGate; Ne-Yo	4:10
14.	"Love Is Your Color" (with Leona Lewis)	Salaam Remi; Claude Kelly	Remi	3:41
Total length:				51:23

France/UK/US Target exclusive deluxe edition bonus tracks
No.	Title	Writer(s)	Producer(s)	Length
13.	"Where You At" (Dave Audé Remix)	R. Kelly	Harvey Mason, Jr.; Dave Audé	5:22
14.	"The Star-Spangled Banner (The National Anthem)" (As Performed At Super Bowl XLIII)	Francis Scott Key		2:28
15.	"What You Think"	Andre Harris; Dave Young	Harris	3:32
16.	"Spotlight" (Afroganic Remix / Original Version (UK))	Hermansen; Eriksen; Smith	Ne-Yo; StarGate	4:10
Total length:				1:02:07

France/UK deluxe bonus track
No.	Title	Writer(s)	Producer(s)	Length
17.	"Love Is Your Color" (with Leona Lewis)	Remi; C. Kelly	Remi	3:41
Total length:				1:06:07

US Target exclusive/UK deluxe edition bonus DVD
No.	Title	Length
1.	"The Making of I Remember Me"
2.	"In the Studio with Jennifer"
3.	"Jennifer Discusses the Music"
4.	"Album Cover Photo Shoot"

Notes

- ^{^[A]} denotes vocals producer
- ^{^[B]} denotes co-producer
- ^{^[C]} denotes additional producer

== Personnel ==
Credits for I Remember Me adapted from Allmusic.

- Jonathan Aarons – horn section
- Yuri Agranovsky – strings
- Matt Alanian – engineer
- Eric Archibald – stylist
- Hernst Bellevue – keyboards, programming
- Kamaljit Bhamra – Watson strings
- Tim Blacksmith – management
- Mike Boris – producer
- David Boyd – assistant
- Val Brathwaite – assistant
- Teddy Campbell – drums
- Chops Horns – horn section
- Johan Van Der Coiff – assistant
- Stephen Coleman – string arrangements
- Michael Daley – assistant
- Danny D. – management
- Clive Davis – producer
- Gleyder "Gee" Disla – engineer
- Nathan East – bass
- Rodney East – keyboards
- Lamar 'Mars' Edwards – organ
- Sharon Ehrlich – creation
- Mikkel S. Eriksen – engineer, instrumentation
- Damien "Dammo" Farmer – bass
- Marina Fleyshman – strings
- Abel Garibaldi – engineer
- Onree Gill – string arrangements
- Yaacov Gluzman – strings
- Angela N. Golightly – production coordination
- Eduard Gulkarov – strings
- Chuck Harmony – instrumentation, producer
- Rich Harrison – instrumentation, producer
- Dabling Harward – engineer, vocal engineer
- Freddie Hendrix – horn section
- Vincent Henry – guitar, horn
- Tor Erik Hermansen – instrumentation
- Andrew Hey – assistant, engineer, guitar, vocal engineer
- Hit Boy – producer
- Matt Huber – assistant
- Ken Ifill – mixing
- Tavia Ivey – vocals (background)
- Larry Jackson – producer
- Jeff Gitelman – guitar (electric)
- Cristyle Johnson – vocals (background)
- Mike "TrakGuru" Johnson – engineer
- R. Kelly – arranger, mixing, producer
- Alicia Keys – keyboards, piano, producer, programming, vocal arrangement, vocal producer
- Danielle Korn – licensing
- Dave Kutch – mastering
- Lake View Terrace Voices of Praise – choir, chorus
- Lance Tolbert – bass
- Damien Lewis – assistant
- Kathy Love – creation
- Donnie Lyle – guitar
- Anthony Mandler – photography
- Robert Marks – mixing
- Harvey Mason Jr. – keyboards, mixing, producer, vocal producer
- Kenny Mason – director
- Kay Ta Matsuno – guitar
- Ian Mereness – engineer
- Justin Merrill – assistant
- Ann Mincieli – engineer
- Steve Mostyn – guitar (bass)
- Alexsandr Nazaryan – strings
- Ne-Yo – producer
- Shannon Pezzetta – make-up
- Polow da Don – producer
- Bruce Purse – bass, trumpet
- Kevin Randolph – piano
- Salaam Remi – bass, drum programming, drums, guitar (bass), keyboards, producer
- Ramon Rivas – assistant
- Daniel Rodriguez – creation
- Salaamremi.com – producer
- Dana Salant – production coordination
- Francisco Salazar – strings
- Mats Lie Skåre – instrumentation
- Len Sluetsky – strings
- David Small – assistant
- Damien Smith – management
- Nikolov Stanislav – strings
- Stargate – producer
- Jeremy Stevenson – engineer
- Sum-Mei Luk – licensing
- Swizz Beatz – drum programming, drums, producer
- Phil Tan – mixing
- Ryan Tedder – drum programming, drums, piano, producer, synthesizer
- Sabina Torosjan – strings
- Denise Trotman – design
- Miles Walker – engineer
- Dave Watson – horn section
- Steven Wolf – drums
- Kiyah Wright – hair stylist
- Noel Zancanella – additional production, drum programming, engineer

== Charts ==
=== Weekly charts ===
Weekly chart performance for I Remember Me
Chart (2011)	Peak position
Australian Albums (ARIA)	26
Canadian Albums (Nielsen SoundScan)	34
German Albums (Offizielle Top 100)	84
Irish Albums (IRMA)	86
Japanese Albums (Oricon)	19
Scottish Albums (Official Charts)	37
South African Albums (RISA)	17
South Korean International Albums (Circle)	13
Swiss Albums (Schweizer Hitparade)	57
UK Albums (Official Charts)	20
UK R&B Albums (Official Charts)	4
US Billboard 200	2
US Top R&B/Hip-Hop Albums (Billboard)	2

=== Year-end charts ===
Year-end chart performance for I Remember Me
Chart (2011)	Position
US Billboard 200	74
US Top R&B/Hip-Hop Albums (Billboard)	17

== Certifications ==
Certifications for I Remember Me
Region	Certification	Certified units/sales
United States (RIAA)	Gold	459,000

== Release history ==
Release dates and formats for I Remember Me
Region	Date	Label	Ref.
United States	March 22, 2011	Arista Records	
Germany	April 22, 2011	Arista Records	
France	April 22, 2011	Arista Records	
United Kingdom	April 25, 2011	RCA Records	
