= Nikki Ross (singer) =

American gospel musician (died 2026)

Background information
- Also known as: Nikki L. Ross Bellamy
- Born: Nikki Le'Shae Ross; February 26, 1974; Houston, Texas, U.S.
- Died: August 14, 2026 (aged 52)
- Genres: Gospel, contemporary gospel, jazz
- Occupations: Singer, pianist, organist, arranger, composer
- Instruments: Vocals, piano, organ
- Years active: 1990s–2026

Nikki L. Ross Bellamy (February 26, 1974—August 14, 2026), known professionally as Nikki Ross, was an American gospel singer, pianist, organist, arranger and composer from Houston, Texas. She became known both for her solo work and for recordings and performances with artists including Kirk Franklin, Ricky Dillard, James Fortune, Israel Houghton, PJ Morton, Harry Connick Jr., Robert Glasper, Kim Burrell, Dorinda Clark-Cole, Smokie Norful, Martha Munizzi, Earnest Pugh and Shaun Martin.

Ross was a longstanding figure in Houston gospel music and recorded internationally as a featured vocalist and background singer. Her best-known recordings include "There Is No Way", "He's Been Just That Good" and "I Surrender All" with Ricky Dillard & New G; "Make a Sound" with James Fortune & FIYA; "Yes" with The Walls Group; and "Sunday Kinda Love" with Houghton, Morton and Aaron Lindsey.

== Background and musicianship ==
Ross was from Houston and was a longtime member of New Jerusalem Churches of Sound Doctrine. The church described her as a member whose voice brought her before audiences around the world while she remained closely connected to her home ministry.

In addition to singing, Ross played piano and organ and worked as a vocal arranger. She cited Stevie Wonder as a major influence; other reported influences included Ella Fitzgerald, The Clark Sisters and her godmother, Houston gospel singer and musician, the legendary COGIC songbird - Dr. Bettye Ransom Nelson. Ross was also known among fellow musicians for her absolute pitch.

In a GospelFlava interview, Houston gospel artist Gary Mayes said that Ross brought "an unbelievable presence" to a performance. He highlighted her perfect pitch, her ability to sing while playing keyboards and her work arranging vocals for Gary Mayes & Nu Era.

== Career ==
=== Recording and arranging work ===
Ross worked extensively as a vocalist and arranger for other gospel, jazz and popular-music artists. Her recording credits include projects involving Kirk Franklin, Ricky Dillard, James Fortune, Houghton, Morton, Glasper, Gladys Knight, Kim Burrell, Dorinda Clark-Cole, Smokie Norful, Martha Munizzi, Earnest Pugh and Shaun Martin. She also worked with Gary Mayes & Nu Era and served on the music staff of BET's Sunday Best.

Ross contributed vocals to Franklin's 2007 album The Fight of My Life. The album subsequently won the 2009 Grammy Award for Best Contemporary R&B Gospel Album.

With Ricky Dillard & New G, Ross was featured on "There Is No Way", "He's Been Just That Good" and "I Surrender All". She later appeared on James Fortune & FIYA's "Make a Sound" and The Walls Group's "Yes". Her recorded catalog also included "Peace" with Rodnie Bryant & CCMC, "Nikki's Testimony" with Arcell Vickers, "I Really Love the Lord" with Donald Godbolt & Spiritual Gifts, and other featured appearances.

In 2013, Ross joined Israel Houghton, Aaron Lindsey and PJ Morton on "Sunday Kinda Love", issued in connection with the film I'm in Love with a Church Girl. In 2014 she appeared on drummer Otis Brown III's Blue Note album The Thought of You, singing on the gospel medley "I Love You Lord/We Exalt Thee/In the Beginning" and on "I Am Your Song". Blue Note described the former as a stripped-down performance that expanded into layered gospel harmonies and identified the latter as a gospel song arranged by Derrick Hodge.

=== Solo recordings ===
Although Ross was widely known for supporting other artists, she also pursued a solo career. In 2011 she prepared a live recording in Houston and described her planned sound as a combination of gospel, jazz, praise and worship and other influences. In 2014 she announced the single "Ready for Change" and sought support for a forthcoming solo album.

Ross released the solo single "God Is Able" in 2021. She described it as a testimony about questioning and understanding her purpose while recognizing that God had not left her. She continued recording while experiencing health problems, including an appearance on gospel singer Trent's "Beautiful Day".

=== Television appearance with Harry Connick Jr. ===
In 2017, Ross appeared on Harry, the nationally syndicated talk show hosted by Harry Connick Jr., and performed "The First Noel". During their conversation, Connick named Ross as one of his favorite musicians. Ross also discussed growing up in Houston, meeting Connick and recovering from a health crisis.

== Health and later years ==
Following a serious health episode, Ross was admitted to an Alabama hospital for emergency treatment and was temporarily taken off her touring schedule. Houston-area singers and musicians, including Kim Burrell, Tramaine Hawkins, Kathy Taylor and others, participated in an event supporting her recovery.

Ross later experienced temporary blindness while continuing to record music. She subsequently returned to public performance and remained active in the gospel community. Her final reported public appearance was at the Gospel Music Workshop of America convention in July 2026.

== Death and legacy ==
Ross died on August 14, 2026, at age 52. Her death was announced by New Jerusalem Churches of Sound Doctrine. The cause of death was not immediately reported.

The church and Houston gospel community remembered Ross for a distinctive voice, international performances and continued connection to local church ministry. She was married to Ty Bellamy. Gospel historian Bob Marovich characterized her death as a loss to both Houston's gospel community and the national gospel music scene.

== Selected recordings ==
Recording	Credited artist or context	Release
"There Is No Way"	Ricky Dillard & New G featuring Nikki Ross	Unplugged...The Way Church Used to Be
"He's Been Just That Good"	Ricky Dillard & New G featuring Nikki Ross	Keep Living
"I Surrender All"	Ricky Dillard & New G featuring Nikki Ross	7th Episode: Live in Toronto
"Make a Sound"	James Fortune & FIYA featuring Nikki Ross	Identity
"Yes"	The Walls Group featuring Nikki Ross	Single
"Sunday Kinda Love"	Israel Houghton featuring Aaron Lindsey, PJ Morton and Nikki Ross	I'm in Love with a Church Girl soundtrack
"I Love You Lord/We Exalt Thee/In the Beginning"	Otis Brown III featuring Nikki Ross	The Thought of You
"I Am Your Song"	Otis Brown III featuring Nikki Ross	The Thought of You
"God Is Able"	Nikki Ross	Single
"My Life Is in Your Hands"	Nikki Ross performing a song written by Kirk Franklin	Live in Stockholm
