= I Remember Me (song) =

Single by Jennifer Hudson

from the album I Remember Me
- Released: April 3, 2011
- Recorded: 2010
- Genre: R&B
- Length: 4:10
- Label: Arista/J Records/3RD STREET
- Songwriters: Jennifer Hudson, Ryan Tedder
- Producer: Ryan Tedder

Jennifer Hudson singles chronology
"Where You At" (2011)	"I Remember Me" (2011)	"No One Gonna Love You" (2011)

"I Remember Me" is a song recorded by R&B singer and actress Jennifer Hudson. It was written by Hudson and Ryan Tedder, who also produced the track. It was released as the lead single from her second album I Remember Me in the UK. The single version, which appears on the UK release of I Remember Me was mixed by Ash Howes. This radio mix was released as a single on April 3, 2011.

== Background ==
On March 16, "I Remember Me" was announced as the first single taken from Hudson's second studio album in the UK. Hudson explained in her interview with Digital Spy, "I'm not sure how it happened, but it doesn't matter to me! I love the album so much, and we got so tied up and confused on what to release that it felt better instead to spread the good music out! We're still not sure what to pick as the next single – I think there are a lot of strong contenders!"

Ryan Tedder spoke on his and Hudson's collaboration to MTV. Tedder explained, "I did the title cut for her new album, I Remember Me. I produced and wrote that with her and it's, honestly, probably the most emotional song I've ever been involved with in my entire career... So I sit down and she's like, 'I hear we're going to work together,' and I'm like, 'Yes, we are,' Tedder recalled. She sends me an e-mail with a diary entry dated right after her family was... and it was, literally, her thoughts immediately after that happened. It started with the phrase, 'I remember me. I used to smile. I used to know love. I used to laugh. I used to hear things.' Tedder revealed that Hudson's private entry was 'about four or five paragraphs' and revolved around her initial response to the stunning loss. She said, 'You're the one to write the song. I want you to put music and melody to these words,' and so I pulled as much as I could from it and tried to turn it around and what we ended up with is 'I Remember Me,' which is the name of her album".

== Critical reception ==
"I Remember Me" received mixed reviews from critics. Thomas Conner from Chicago Sun-Times stated that "The title track, which sports Hudson's only co-writing credit here, slings clichés while the background clatter, specifically a bashing electronic drum, starts to become an issue." Brian Mansfield from USA Today claims, "Jennifer says there's little left of the woman she was 10 years ago except her voice and a scar of her hand. And anyone who watched her during American Idol's third season could be forgiven for barely recognizing the Oscar-winning singer and actress of 2011. So this kind of confident self-examination is probably warranted, as she sings, "Memories, they fading, but I'm the one who made them/So I keep the love close enough to say, 'I remember me.'" Slant Magazine's Matthew Cole stated that ""I Remember Me" is the centerpiece of Hudson's album, since it's both the title track and the only song on which she gets a co-writing credit. The words "I remember me" are repeated over and over again each time Hudson takes a show-boating lap around the chorus; nevertheless, I can't say I have any idea what that phrase is supposed to mean beyond some vague gesture of self-affirmation. The song plods and twinkles in equal measure." Entertainment Weekly's Mikael Wood expresses that "Where 2008's Jennifer Hudson was bogged down with serious, self-assuring ballads, here she aims for a lighter vibe... coasting over producer Ryan Tedder's signature emo-soul synths on the sparkling title track." Kitty Empire of The Observer gave the song a negative review, stating "That said, the songs on her second album don't ask much of her, and even the title track struggles to be sufficiently poignant." Orange U.K. stated "I Remember Me AKA the UK comeback single. A deeply personal track, and a brave move to make her international pop return with a song that deals so openly with her troubled life. The title should suggest, however, that the song has a positive outlook – and like the album as a whole, is the story of a woman recovering from tragedy, not one who has been overcome by it. Powerful production echoes the strength of the lyrics and makes for a spine-tingling return to form."

== Promotion ==
In the U.S., Hudson performed "I Remember Me" during the promotion for the album on Sessions@AOL and a special for BET's 106 & Park. Whilst promoting the single release in the UK, Hudson she performed the song on the April 22 edition of The Graham Norton Show, where she was also interviewed. On April 25, she was interviewed and performed "I Remember Me" on Daybreak. Hudson also pre-recorded an interview and performance for The Alan Titchmarsh Show, which was broadcast on May 10, 2011.

== Chart performance ==
The single first appeared on the UK Singles Chart on May 1, 2011, entering the chart at number 89.

== Track listing ==
Digital Single

1. "I Remember Me" (Radio Mix) – 3:34

Other Versions

- "I Remember Me" (Album Version) – 4:10

== Charts ==
Weekly chart performance for "I Remember Me"
Chart (2011)	Peak position
Japan Hot 100 (Billboard)	8
Slovakia Airplay (ČNS IFPI)	93
South Korea International (Gaon)	99
South Korea International (Gaon) Radio mix	30
UK Singles (Official Charts)	89

== Release history ==
List of releases of "I Remember Me"
Region	Date	Format(s)	Ref
United Kingdom	April 3, 2011	Digital download	
Australia	April 18, 2011	Contemporary hit radio	
