= I Can't Describe (The Way I Feel) =

Single by Jennifer Hudson featuring T.I.

from the album JHUD
- Released: September 24, 2013
- Length: 3:46
- Label: RCA
- Songwriters: Clifford Harris; Pharrell Williams
- Producer: Pharrell Williams

Jennifer Hudson singles chronology
"Think Like a Man" (2012)	"I Can't Describe (The Way I Feel)" (2013)	"Walk It Out" (2014)

T.I. singles chronology
"Change Your Life" (2013)	"I Can't Describe (The Way I Feel)" (2013)	"Coke Bottle" (2014)

"I Can't Describe (The Way I Feel)" is a song by the American singer Jennifer Hudson, released worldwide on September 24, 2013, as the lead single from her third album, JHUD (2014). The song was originally intended to be recorded by Miley Cyrus, during sessions for her album, Bangerz, with the rap verse performed by Tyler, The Creator. However, the track was not finalized or approved for the album. Hudson sang it instead, with the rap verse performed by American rapper T.I. The song, which was produced by American musician Pharrell Williams, is an uptempo 1970s- and 1980s-inspired dance ballad that is reminiscent of Evelyn King's disco songs "I'm in Love" and "Love Come Down".

== Music video ==
The music video for "I Can't Describe (The Way I Feel)" was released on January 23, 2014. It was directed by Anthony Mandler.

== Charts ==
Chart (2013–14)	Peak position
South Korea International (Circle)	54
UK Singles (Official Charts Company)	109
UK Hip Hop/R&B (Official Charts)	20
