= No One Gonna Love You =

Single by Jennifer Hudson

from the album I Remember Me
- Released: May 24, 2011
- Length: 3:48
- Label: Arista; J
- Songwriter: Rich Harrison
- Producer: Rich Harrison

Jennifer Hudson singles chronology
"I Remember Me" (2011)	"No One Gonna Love You" (2011)	"Think Like a Man" (2012)

"No One Gonna Love You" is a song recorded by American singer Jennifer Hudson. It was written by Rich Harrison who also produced the song. It is the second US single from her second album I Remember Me. It impacted radio in the United States on May 24, 2011. This song has also been sampled by J. Cole in the single "Crooked Smile" off his Born Sinner album.

== Background ==
"No One Gonna Love You" was written and produced by Rich Harrison. Hudson has expressed that the record was one of the songs she was most excited about recording for parent album I Remember Me. She highlighted its Mary J. Blige-inspired feel and noted that it was a favorite of her son's. Regarding the song's composition, Thomas Conner from The Chicago Sun-Times commented: "Harrison dials everything back, including an interesting plunky muted piano, to showcase Hudson's voice, which builds slowly from ditty to diva in less than four minutes and never boils over."

== Promotion ==
Hudson performed "No One Gonna Love You" on the Late Show with David Letterman on June 16, 2011.

== Chart performance ==
The song has reached number 23 on the Hot R&B/Hip-Hop Songs and number 19 on the Hot Dance Club Songs.

== Music video ==
The music video for "No One Gonna Love You" was directed by Diane Martel and premiered on BET's 106 & Park and Vevo.com on June 24, 2011. The video begins with Hudson reminding her boyfriend not to be late for their anniversary dinner and he becomes confused. Later, Hudson arrives at the restaurant and her boyfriend is not there, but he tries to call her but she ignores his call and goes back to their apartment. When she gets there, she tries to turn on the lights, which are not working. Then her boyfriend turns on a lamp and the place is filled with balloons and streamers. He then surprises Hudson by sneaking an engagement ring on her finger and she becomes overjoyed and they embrace. Scenes of Hudson performing the song in their apartment, as well as dancing with two other dancers on a chair, wearing a black hat are also featured.

== Track listing ==
Official versions

- "No One Gonna Love You" – 3:48
- "No One Gonna Love You" (Bimbo Jones club mix) – 7:29
- "No One Gonna Love You" (Bimbo Jones radio edit) – 4:11
- "No One Gonna Love You" (Jason Nevins club mix) – 6:25
- "No One Gonna Love You" (Jason Nevins instrumental) – 6:25
- "No One Gonna Love You" (Jason Nevins radio edit) – 3:58

== Charts ==
=== Weekly charts ===
Weekly chart performance for "No One Gonna Love You"
Chart (2011)	Peak position
Canada Urban Airplay (Nielsen BDS)	31
US Hot R&B/Hip-Hop Songs (Billboard)	23
US Hot Dance Club Songs (Billboard)	19

=== Year-end charts ===
Year-end chart performance for "No One Gonna Love You"
Chart (2011)	Position
US Adult R&B Songs (Billboard)	24

== Release history ==
List of releases of "No One Gonna Love You"
Region	Date	Format(s)	Label	Ref
United States	May 24, 2011	Radio debut	Arista; J	
United Kingdom	July 13, 2011	Digital download; remix single	Arista; J	
United States	July 13, 2011	Digital download; remix single	Arista; J	
