= Terry Hunter =

- Origin: Chicago, Illinois, U.S.
- Occupation(s): DJ, producer
- Years active: 1990—present
- Labels: T's Box Records
- Website: http://terryhuntermusic.com

Terry Hunter is an American house music DJ and Grammy-nominated producer from Chicago, Illinois. He has been active in the Chicago music scene since the early 1990s. He has produced many of his own albums, as well as remixes for other artists.

== Career ==
In 1990, Hunter produced his first release "Madness", which became an underground hit. While continuing to DJ in Chicago and beyond, he honed serious production skills, contributing his talents to remixes for top artists, including Michael Jackson, Janet Jackson, Mary J. Blige, R. Kelly, Byron Stingily (of Chicago's Ten City), Barbara Tucker and La India. His 1997 track, "Harvest for the World" (a cover of The Isley Brothers track) peaked at #48 on the UK Singles Chart in July that year.

In order to develop the next generation of house music talent, Hunter launched his own label, T's Box Records, in 2004.

In 2006, he became the first new member of Chicago's Chosen Few DJs in nearly 30 years. He was named "Producer of the Year" by 5 Magazine in 2009.

In 2011, Hunter conceived and co-produced the first 'Chicago House DJ Day', bringing together for the first time 100 of the most influential DJs in Chicago house music.

Terry Hunter has been nominated for Grammy Awards three times. His first Grammy nomination in 2015 was in “Best R&B Performance” for producing Jennifer Hudson’s track “It’s Your World”. His remixes of Beyonce's Break My Soul and Mariah Carey's Workin' Hard earned him consecutive Grammy nominations in 2023 and 2024 in the Best Remixed Recording category.
