= Where You At (Jennifer Hudson song) =

Single by Jennifer Hudson

from the album I Remember Me
- Released: February 8, 2011
- Length: 3:47
- Label: Arista; J
- Songwriter: R. Kelly
- Producer: R. Kelly

Jennifer Hudson singles chronology
"Giving Myself" (2009)	"Where You At" (2011)	"I Remember Me" (2011)

"Where You At" is a song recorded by American recording artist Jennifer Hudson. It was written and produced by fellow R&B singer R. Kelly for her second album I Remember Me (2011). Released as the album's lead single, the song debuted on January 24, 2011 and was released on February 8, 2011. Remixes for the song have been made by Dave Audé. The track reached number one on the US Billboard Adult R&B singles chart.

In 2019, Hudson removed the song from all streaming services and would refuse to perform it live in support of several women who had come forward with stories of abuse at the hands of the songs producer and writer, Kelly. As of 2026, the song is available to stream on all music platforms.

== Critical reception ==
The song received acclaim from music critics. Thomas Conner from Chicago Sun-Times admired Hudson's voice saying, "' Where You At,' written and produced by fellow South Sider R. Kelly, roars to a big finish with Hudson shouting, 'Deliver!' until she rockets right off the treble clef—just in time for an incredibly ill-advised fade-out." Elysa Gardner from USA Today claims, "It's a credit to the singer's personal grace and her artistic instincts that she avoids easy sentimentality, dressing down a lover on R. Kelly-written single Where You At..." Kevin Ritchie from Now Magazine enjoyed the lyrics, calling it a "vivid riposte to an elusive lover." Genevieve Koshi from The A.V. Club acclaimed the song by saying, "the R. Kelly-written-and-produced “Where You At” manages a comparatively subtler, sexy groove, and sounds pretty much exactly like you’d expect an R. Kelly song sung by Jennifer Hudson to sound." The music video for the song also won the NAACP Image Award for Outstanding Music Video at the 43rd NAACP Image Awards.

== Promotion ==
Hudson performed "Where You At" on The Oprah Winfrey Show on February 10, 2011. She performed the song on March 23, 2011, on "The Wendy Williams Show" She also performed the song on The Ellen DeGeneres Show which aired on February 16, 2011 and on The View on March 22, 2011. On March 25, 2011 she performed the track on American Idol.

== Chart performance ==
The single first appeared on the US Billboard Hot R&B/Hip-Hop Songs chart at number 53 and peaked at number 10. It also debuted at number 96 on the Billboard Hot 100 chart. In its third week and during the album's release week, the song jumped 25 positions to number 64 on the chart.

== Music video ==
The music video for "Where You At" premiered on BET's 106 & Park and Vevo.com on February 24, 2011 and was directed by Anthony Mandler.

== Track listing ==
- "Where You At" – 3:30
- "Where You At" (Dave Audé Club Instrumental) – 6:45
- "Where You At" (Dave Audé Club Mix) – 6:45
- "Where You At" (Dave Audé Dub) – 6:15
- "Where You At" (Dave Audé Mixshow) – 5:22
- "Where You At" (Dave Audé Radio Edit) – 4:08

== Charts ==
=== Weekly charts ===
Weekly chart performance for "Where You At"
Chart (2011)	Peak position
Netherlands (Urban Top 100)	67
South Korea International (Gaon)	15
US Adult R&B Songs (Billboard)	1
US Billboard Hot 100	64
US Dance Club Songs (Billboard)	3
US Hot R&B/Hip-Hop Songs (Billboard)	10

=== Year-end charts ===
Year-end chart performance for "Where You At"
Chart (2011)	Position
US Adult R&B Songs (Billboard)	17
US Hot R&B/Hip-Hop Songs (Billboard)	54

== Radio debut and release history ==
List of releases of "Where You At"
Region	Date	Format(s)	Ref
United States	January 24, 2011	Radio debut	
United States	February 8, 2011	Digital download	
