= It's Your World (song) =

Single by Jennifer Hudson featuring R. Kelly

from the album JHUD
- Released: July 8, 2014
- Recorded: 2013–2014
- Length: 5:16
- Label: RCA
- Songwriter: Robert Kelly
- Producer: Terry Hunter

Jennifer Hudson singles chronology
"Walk It Out" (2014)	"It's Your World" (2014)	"Go All Night" (2014)

R. Kelly singles chronology
"PYD" (2013)	"It's Your World" (2014)	"Bump & Grind 2014" (2014)

"It's Your World" is a song by American recording artist Jennifer Hudson featuring fellow singer R. Kelly, recorded for her third studio album JHUD (2014). It was written by Kelly and produced by DJ Terry Hunter. Released worldwide on July 8, 2014 as the album's third single, Hudson sang it for the first time at BET Awards 2014 on June 29, 2014. No music video was made for the single. The song was nominated for a Grammy Award for Best R&B Performance. In 2019, Hudson removed "It's Your World" from all streaming platforms and stopped performing it in support of women who had come forward with stories of abuse from Kelly.

== Background ==
"It's Your World" was written by frequent Hudson collaborator R. Kelly, while production was handled by DJ Terry Hunter. Commenting on its composition, Hudson wrote on Twitter: "R. Kelly had to be thinking about Aretha Franklin's "Think" when he created my song "It's Your World". It's a vocal marathon!"

== Live performances ==
The song has been performed by Jennifer Hudson on numerous stages and live shows like BET Awards 2014, The Voice, America's Got Talent, Today Show and Steve Harvey. Kelly has not as of yet performed this song live with Hudson or solo.

== Track listing ==
Digital download

1. "It's Your World " (featuring R. Kelly) – 5:16

== Credits and personnel ==
Credits adapted from AllMusic.

- Jennifer Hudson – Creative Director, Primary Artist
- Robert Kelly – Composer, Featured Artist
- Terry Hunter – Executive Producer

== Charts ==
For the week ending August 24, 2014, "It's Your World" debuted at number 48 on the Hot R&B/Hip-Hop Airplay.

=== Weekly charts ===
Chart (2014–15)	Peak position
US Adult R&B Songs (Billboard)	11
US Dance Club Songs (Billboard)	3
US R&B/Hip-Hop Airplay (Billboard)	35

=== Year-end charts ===
Chart (2014)	Position
US Adult R&B Songs (Billboard)	36
