= Walk It Out (Jennifer Hudson song) =

Single by Jennifer Hudson featuring Timbaland

from the album JHUD
- Released: April 29, 2014
- Genre: R&B
- Length: 4:43
- Label: RCA
- Songwriters: Jennifer Hudson; Timothy Mosley; Jerome Harmon; Mike Tompkins; Lyrica Anderson; Jacob Luttrell; Chris Godbey; James Washington
- Producers: Timbaland; J-Roc

Jennifer Hudson singles chronology
"I Can't Describe (The Way I Feel)" (2013)	"Walk It Out" (2014)	"It's Your World" (2014)

Timbaland singles chronology
"Coke Bottle" (2014)	"Walk It Out" (2014)	"Smile" (2015)

"Walk It Out" is a song by American singer Jennifer Hudson. It was written by Lyrica Anderson, Jacob Luttrell, Chris Godbey, Mike Tompkins, Jim Beanz, J-Roc, Hudson and Timbaland for her third studio album JHUD (2014), while production was handled by the latter. The mid-tempo track was released worldwide on April 29, 2014 as the second single from the album.

== Music video ==
The music video for "Walk It Out" was released on June 16, 2014. Shot in Chicago, it was directed by Little X and follows Hudson through the streets of Chicago. Timbaland and Hudson's partner David Otunga both make cameo appearances in the video.

== Track listings ==
Digital single
No.	Title	Length
1.	"Walk It Out" (featuring Timbaland)	4:43

== Credits and personnel ==
Credits adapted from the liner notes of JHUD.

- Lyrica Anderson – writer
- Matt Bang – recording
- Jim Beanz – vocal production, writer
- Jacob Luttrell – writer
- Chris Godbey – mixing, recording, writer
- Jerome Harmon – producer, writer
- Jennifer Hudson – vocals, writer
- Rob Suchecki – recording assistant
- Timbaland – producer, vocals, writer
- Mike Tompkins – additional vocals, writer

== Charts ==
Chart (2014)	Peak position
South Korea International (Gaon)	56
US Adult R&B Songs (Billboard)	22
US R&B/Hip-Hop Airplay (Billboard)	43
