= Yolanda Adams discography =

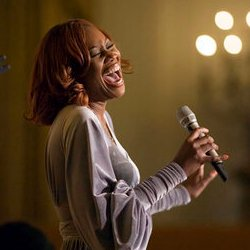
- Yolanda Adams performing at the White House, February 2007
- Studio albums: 11
- Live albums: 2
- Compilation albums: 6

American gospel singer Yolanda Adams has released 11 studio albums, 2 live albums and 6 compilation albums. Adams has been named as the "First Lady of Modern Gospel" by the media. With sales of nearly 10 million records worldwide, she was Billboard's Top Gospel Artist of the 2000s and has sold 4.5 million albums in the US since 1991. Five of her albums have reached number one on the US Billboard Top Gospel Albums chart. The Gospel Music Association inducted her into the Gospel Music Hall of Fame. Mountain High... Valley Low remains her best-selling album in the US, being certified Platinum by RIAA, while her albums Believe and Verity Presents: The Best of Yolanda Adams both reached gold status respectively.

== Albums ==
=== Studio albums ===
List of studio albums, with selected chart positions, sales figures and certifications
Title	Album details	Peak chart positions				Sales	Certifications
Title	Album details	US	US Gospel	US Christ.	US R&B /HH	Sales	Certifications
Just as I Am	Released: September 22, 1987; Label: Nine / Sound of Gospel	—	8	—	—		
Through the Storm	Released: December 26, 1991; Label: Tribute	—	8	—	—		
Save the World	Released: 1993; Label: Tribute	—	6	—	—	US: 150,000	
More Than a Melody	Released: October 1995; Label: Tribute	—	4	4	—	US: 100,000	
Songs from the Heart	Released: September 15, 1998; Label: Verity	—	3	9	—		
Mountain High...Valley Low	Released: September 21, 1999; Label: Elektra	24	1	1	5	US: 1,374,000	RIAA: Platinum
Christmas With Yolanda Adams	Released: October 24, 2000; Label: Elektra	86	1	2	31		
Believe	Released: December 4, 2001; Label: Elektra	42	1	2	7	US: 700,000	RIAA: Gold
Day by Day	Released: May 3, 2005; Label: Atlantic	23	1	—	4		
What a Wonderful Time	Released: October 9, 2007; Label: Columbia	179	2	—	28		
Becoming	Released: May 3, 2011; Label: N-House Music Group	99	3	—	22		
Sunny Days	Released: September 13, 2024; Label: Epic	—	9	—	—		
"—" denotes releases that did not chart or were not released in that territory.

=== Live albums ===
List of live albums, with selected chart positions and sales figures
Title	Album details	Peak chart positions				Sales
Title	Album details	US	US Gospel	US Christ.	US R&B /HH	Sales
Shakin' the House: Live in L.A. (with Hezekiah Walker and Fred Hammond)	Released: March 1, 1996; Label: Benson (#4272) / Verity (#43068) / Zomba (#0844184272)	—	10	17	—	
Yolanda... Live in Washington	Released: June 1, 1996; Label: Verity	—	5	25	—	US: 150,000
The Experience	Released: March 20, 2001; Label: Elektra	63	2	1	24	
"—" denotes releases that did not chart or were not released in that territory.

=== Compilation albums ===
List of compilation albums, with selected chart positions and certifications
Title	Album details	Peak chart positions				Certifications
Title	Album details	US	US Gospel	US Christ.	US R&B /HH	Certifications
At Her Very Best (with The Southeast Inspirational Choir)	Released: 1993; Label: Paula (#812)	—	—	—	—	
The Best of Yolanda Adams	Released: October 26, 1999; Label: Verity	—	9	23	—	RIAA: Gold
Yolanda Adams and Albertina Walker "The Divas of Gospel"	Released: February 27, 2001; Label: Fuel 2000	—	—	—	—	
The Praise and Worship Songs of Yolanda Adams	Released: May 6, 2003; Label: Verity	—	6	26	65	
The Essential Yolanda Adams	Released: October 24, 2006; Label: Verity / Legacy	—	39	—	—	
The Best of Me	Released: May 8, 2007; Label: Atlantic	60	1	—	9	
Playlist: The Very Best of Yolanda Adams	Released: September 2, 2008; Label: Legacy	—	12	26	—	
Setlist: The Very Best of Yolanda Adams Live	Released: July 12, 2011; Label: Legacy / Verity (#88697925572)	—	—	—	—	
"—" denotes releases that did not chart or were not released in that territory.

== Singles ==
=== As a lead artist ===
List of singles, with selected chart positions, showing year released and album name
Title	Year	Peak chart positions				Certifications	Album
Title	Year	US	US Gospel	US R&B /HH	US Adult R&B	Certifications	Album
"The Battle Is the Lord's"	1993	—	—	—	—	RIAA: Gold	Save the World
"Gotta Have Love"	1995	—	—	97	—		More Than a Melody
"The Battle Is the Lord's" (Live)	1996	—	— (Note: "The Battle Is the Lord's" did not enter the US Billboard Hot Gospel Songs chart, but peaked at number 12 on the US Gospel Digital Song Sales chart and number 20 on the US Gospel Streaming Songs chart.)	75	20		Yolanda... Live in Washington
"Only Believe"	1998	—	—	—	—		Songs from the Heart
"Is Your All on the Altar"	1998	—	—	—	—		Songs from the Heart
"Still I Rise"	1998	—	— (Note: "Still I Rise" did not enter the US Billboard Hot Gospel Songs chart, but peaked at number 6 on the US Gospel Digital Song Sales chart.)	—	—		Songs from the Heart
"Open My Heart"	1999	57	— (Note: "Open My Heart" did not enter the US Billboard Hot Gospel Songs chart, but peaked at number 2 on the US Gospel Digital Song Sales chart and number 7 on the US Gospel Streaming Songs chart.)	10	1	RIAA: Gold	Mountain High...Valley Low
"Yeah"	1999	—	—	— (Note: "Yeah" did not enter the US Billboard Hot R&B/Hip-Hop Songs chart, but peaked at number 13 on the US Bubbling Under R&B/Hip-Hop Songs chart.)	29		Mountain High...Valley Low
"Fragile Heart"	2000	—	—	— (Note: "Fragile Heart" did not enter the US Billboard Hot R&B/Hip-Hop Songs chart, but peaked at number 25 on the US Bubbling Under R&B/Hip-Hop Songs chart.)	38		Mountain High...Valley Low
"The Things We Do"	2000	—	—	—	—		Mountain High...Valley Low
"I Believe I Can Fly" (featuring Gerald Levert)	2001	—	—	— (Note: "I Believe I Can Fly" did not enter the US Billboard Hot R&B/Hip-Hop Songs chart, but peaked at number 4 on the US Bubbling Under R&B/Hip-Hop Songs chart.)	25	RMNZ: Gold	The Experience
"Never Give Up"	2001	—	—	79	15		Believe
"I'm Gonna Be Ready"	2001	—	— (Note: "I'm Gonna Be Ready" did not enter the US Billboard Hot Gospel Songs chart, but peaked at number 24 on the US Gospel Streaming Songs chart.)	74	10		Believe
"I Gotta Believe"	2001	—	—	—	—		Believe
"The Prayer" (with Donnie McClurkin)	2003	—	—	—	35		Donnie McClurkin... Again
"Be Blessed"	2005	—	1	—	40		Day by Day
"Victory"	2005	—	3	— (Note: "Victory" did not enter the US Billboard Hot R&B/Hip-Hop Songs chart, but peaked at number 8 on the US Bubbling Under R&B/Hip-Hop Songs chart.)	—		Day by Day
"Someone Watching Over You"	2006	—	31	57	19		Day by Day
"This Too Shall Pass"	2006	—	15	—	27		Day by Day
"Step Aside"	2007	—	10	—	—		Daddy's Little Girls (OST)
"Hold On"	2007	—	15	— (Note: "Hold On" did not enter the US Billboard Hot R&B/Hip-Hop Songs chart, but peaked at number 4 on the US Bubbling Under R&B/Hip-Hop Songs chart.)	26		What a Wonderful Time
"Be Still"	2011	—	4	93	35		Becoming
"When Love Takes Over"	2016	—	—	—	—		The Passion: New Orleans
"In Him There Is No Sorrow" (with Donald Lawrence & Co. and Twinkie Clark)	2023	—	17	—	—		Donald Lawrence Presents Power: A Tribute to Twinkie Clark
"Church Doors"	2024	—	4	— (Note: "Church Doors" did not enter the US Billboard Hot R&B/Hip-Hop Songs chart, but peaked at number 40 on the US R&B/Hip-Hop Airplay chart.)	20		Sunny Days
"Blessings"	2024	—	8	—	—		Sunny Days
"Thank You" (with Trae tha Truth and Chance the Rapper)	2025	—	—	—	—		—N/a
"Hero is Born"	2025	—	—	—	—		Sunny Days
"Hell’s Kitchen’s a Merry Little Christmas" (with Amanda Reid, Phil. and Jessica Vosk featuring Hell’s Kitchen Cast)	2025	—	—	—	—		—N/a
"—" denotes releases that did not chart or were not released in that territory.

=== As a featured artist ===
List of singles as featured artist, with selected chart positions, showing year released and album name
Title	Year	Peak chart positions				Album
Title	Year	US Gospel	US R&B /HH	US Adult R&B	US AC	Album
"I Believe I Can Fly" (Kenny G featuring Yolanda Adams)	2005	—	—	—	28	At Last...The Duets Album
"Where Love Begins" (Patti LaBelle featuring Yolanda Adams)	2006	—	68	17	—	The Gospel According to Patti LaBelle
"When You Love" (Donnie McClurkin featuring CeCe Winans, Yolanda Adams and Mary Mary)	2009	—	—	—	—	We All Are One (Live in Detroit)
"Best for Last" (Donald Lawrence featuring Yolanda Adams & the Tri-City Singers)	2013	— (Note: "Best for Last" did not enter the US Billboard Hot Gospel Songs chart, but peaked at number 15 on the US Gospel Airplay chart.)	—	—	—	20 Year Celebration, Vol. 1: Best for Last
"How Awesome Is Our God" (Israel & New Breed featuring Yolanda Adams)	2015	9	—	—	—	Covered: Alive in Asia
"Bless Somebody Else (Dorothy’s Song)" (Kurt Carr featuring The Kurt Carr Singers & Friends)	2019	— (Note: "Bless Somebody Else (Dorothy’s Song)" did not enter the US Billboard Hot Gospel Songs chart, but peaked at number 12 on the US Gospel Digital Song Sales chart.)	—	—	—	Bless Somebody Else
"Clap Your Hands" (Anita Wilson featuring Yolanda Adams)	2020	—	—	—	—	Dance Soul
"—" denotes releases that did not chart or were not released in that territory.

== Other charted songs ==
List of other charted songs, with selected chart positions, showing year released and album name
Title	Year	Peak chart positions	Album
Title	Year	US Gospel Digital Sales	Album
"In the Midst of It All"	1999	13	Mountain High...Valley Low
"Talkin' 'Bout Jesus" (Gloria Gaynor featuring Yolanda Adams)	2019	12	Testimony
"—" denotes releases that did not chart or were not released in that territory.

== Videography ==
=== DVD/video releases ===
- Yolanda Adams Live in Concert - An Unforgettable Evening (DVD, 2002 reissue)
- Yolanda Live: The Unforgettable Evening: Volume One (VHS)
- Yolanda Adams Live in Washington D.C.: Volume Two (VHS)
- Shakin' The House... Live In L.A. (VHS) (1998) ("Even Me," "You Know that I Know," "I'll Always Remember," and "The Lord is With Us in This Place")
- Come Together - A Night for John Lennon's Words and Music (2001) ("Imagine")
- The Concert for World Children's Day (2002) ("I Believe I Can Fly")
- A Clay Aiken Christmas (2004) ("Oh Holy Night," "Santa Claus Is Coming to Town" (w/Clay Aiken and Barry Manilow) and "Because It's Christmas" (w/Aiken and Manilow))
- Hopeville (2008) - (w/Donnie McClurkin and Kirk Franklin) (DVD)

=== Music videos ===
- "Gotta Have Love" (Tribute, 1996)
- "Yeah" (Elektra, 1999)
- "Open My Heart" (Elektra, 1999)
- "I Believe I Can Fly" (Elektra, 2000)
- "Never Give Up" (Elektra, 2001)
- "Victory" (Atlantic, 2005)
- "This Too Shall Pass" (Atlantic, 2005)
- "Be Still" (N-House Music Group, 2012)

=== Filmography ===
- The Gospel (2005)
- Sweating in the Spirit (2005)
- "The Parkers" (2004)
- "A Clay Aiken Christmas" (TV) (2004)
- "Soul Food" (2004)

== Guest appearances ==
List of non-single guest appearances, with other performing artists, showing year released and album name
Title	Year	Other artist(s)	Album	Ref.
"This Too Shall Pass"	1995	Crystal Lewis	Sisters: The Story Goes On	
"Wholly Holy"	1997	Everette Harp	What's Going On	
"O Little Town of Bethlehem"	1998	—N/a	The Real Meaning Of Christmas: Volume 2	
"Shepherd's Cradle Song"	1998	—N/a	The Real Meaning Of Christmas: Volume 2	
"America the Beautiful / We Shall Overcome"	1999	O'Landa Draper's Associates, Shirley Caesar, Daryl Coley, Rev. James Moore	Sing America	
"Shining Star"	2000	—N/a	Music from and Inspired by Jesus: The Epic Mini-Series	
"If We Could Remember"	2002	—N/a	The Sum of All Fears	
"Higher Ground"	2002	Missy Elliott, Tweet, Karen Clark Sheard, Kim Burrell, Dorinda Clark Cole, Mary Mary	Miss E... So Addictive and 2nd Chance	
"Brand New Day"	2002	Karen Clark Sheard	2nd Chance	
"I Believe"	2004	—N/a	Honey: Music from & Inspired by the Motion Picture	
"I Believe I Can Fly"	2004	Kenny G	At Last...The Duets Album	
"Afterwhile"	2005	Kirk Franklin	Hero	
"Everyday (Family Reunion)"	2006	Chaka Khan, Gerald Levert, Carl Thomas	Madea's Family Reunion	
"Me Dance"	2006	—N/a	Jack's Big Music Show (Season One)	
"I Wish"	2006	Patti LaBelle, Fantasia	Happy Feet: Music from the Motion Picture	
"Order My Steps (Dear Lord)"	2007	Bone Thugs-n-Harmony	Strength & Loyalty	
"You Make Me Feel Brand New"	2008	Johnny Mathis	A Night to Remember	
"You"	2009	—N/a	Madea Goes To Jail	
"Intro"	2017	Anita Wilson	Sunday Song	
"Yolanda & Anita Reprise"	2017	Anita Wilson	Sunday Song	
"O Holy Night"	2017	—N/a	The Star	
"Do You Believe"	2018	PJ Morton	Christmas with PJ Morton	
"How Great"	2019	William McDowell	The Cry: A Live Worship Experience	
"Do You Believe"	2020	PJ Morton	Gospel According to PJ: From the Songbook of PJ Morton	
"One Moment from Glory"	2022	—N/a	Kingdom Business: Season 1	
"The Me You See"	2022	Chaundre Broomfield	Kingdom Business: Season 1	
"In Control"	2022	—N/a	Kingdom Business: Season 1	
"Psalm of Contention"	2022	—N/a	Kingdom Business: Season 1	
"Jesus Can Work It Out"	2022	—N/a	Kingdom Business: Season 1	
"Time"	2023	Kingdom Business Cast	Kingdom Business: Season 2	
"Grace Amazing"	2023	Kingdom Business Cast	Kingdom Business: Season 2	
"We Family"	2023	Kingdom Business Cast, Chaundre Broomfield, Kiandra Richardson	Kingdom Business: Season 2	

== Other releases ==
- Yolanda Adams Smooth Jazz Tribute
  - Artist: Various Artists
  - Release Date: March 13, 2007
  - Label: CC Ent/Copycats
