= Through the Storm (Yolanda Adams album) =

Studio album by Yolanda Adams
- Released: December 26, 1991
- Studio: Hummingbird Recording in Nashville, Tennessee except "The Only Way", recorded at Digital Recorders
- Genre: Gospel
- Length: 49:31
- Label: Tribute
- Producer: Ben Tankard; Yolanda Adams (co-producer); Mervyn Warren

Yolanda Adams chronology
Just as I Am (1987)	Through the Storm (1991)	Save the World (1993)

Professional ratings
Review scores
Source	Rating
AllMusic	3/5 stars
Cross Rhythms	8/10 squares
The Encyclopedia of Popular Music	3/5 stars

Through the Storm is the second studio album by American gospel singer Yolanda Adams. It was released by Tribute Records on December 26, 1991 in the United States. This album and two more: Save the World and More Than a Melody were re-released on Verity Records in 1997 before her last album, Songs from the Heart.

== Track listing ==
Credits taken from the album's liner notes.

No.	Title	Writer(s)	Producer(s)	Length
1.	"You Know That I Know"	Yolanda Adams; Gregory Curtis	Ben Tankard; Adams	4:15
2.	"My Everything"	Adams; Tankard	Tankard; Adams	4:41
3.	"Through the Storm"	V. Michael McKay	Tankard; Adams	4:56
4.	"I'm Free"	Curtis	Tankard; Adams	5:46
5.	"Even Me"	Roberta Martin	Tankard; Adams	5:26
6.	"Forever with Me"	Adams; Tankard	Tankard; Adams	4:14
7.	"The Only Way"	Fred Vaughn; Mervyn Warren	Warren	5:25
8.	"Just a Prayer Away"	Curtis	Tankard; Adams	4:36
9.	"A Message to You"	Adams; Tankard	Tankard; Adams	5:22
10.	"Let Thy Will Be Done"	Armirris Palmore	Tankard; Adams	5:00

== Charts ==
=== Weekly charts ===
Chart (1991)	Peak position
US Top Gospel Albums (Billboard)	8

=== Year-end charts ===
Chart (1992)	Peak position
US Top Gospel Albums (Billboard)	10
