= The Experience (Yolanda Adams album) =

Live album by Yolanda Adams
- Released: March 20, 2001
- Genre: Soul, Gospel
- Length: 65:15
- Label: Elektra
- Producer: Shep Crawford, Yolanda Adams

Yolanda Adams chronology
Christmas With Yolanda Adams (2000)	The Experience (2001)	Believe (2001)

Singles from The Experience
- 1. "I Believe I Can Fly" Released: 2001

Professional ratings
Review scores
Source	Rating
Allmusic	2/5 stars
The Encyclopedia of Popular Music	3/5 stars

The Experience is a 2001 live album by gospel singer Yolanda Adams. The album also includes two covers of R. Kelly's "I Believe I Can Fly": one studio version featuring R&B vocalist Gerald Levert and a live solo version. Both were released as singles. The album was nominated for and won a Grammy for Best Contemporary Soul Gospel Album the following year (the second win for Adams).

== Track listing ==
1. "I Believe I Can Fly" featuring Gerald Levert (R. Kelly) 5:59
2. "Already Alright" (Live) 5:03
3. "Continual Praise" (Live) 4:29
4. "Fragile Heart" (Live) 7:25
5. "What About The Children?" (Live) 6:15
6. "Ye Of Little Faith" (Live) 4:56
7. "Open My Heart (Live) 7:46
8. "That Name" (Live) 5:05
9. "In The Midst Of It All" (Live) 5:39
10. "Yeah" (Live) 5:57
11. "I Believe I Can Fly" (Live) (R. Kelly) 6:12
- Writer credits for tracks 2-10 are from previous albums: Mountain High... Valley Low, Save the World, More Than a Melody

== Charts ==
=== Weekly charts ===
Chart (2001)	Peak position
US Billboard 200	63
US Top R&B/Hip-Hop Albums (Billboard)	24
US Top Gospel Albums (Billboard)	2
US Top Christian Albums (Billboard)	1

=== Year-end charts ===
Chart (2001)	Position
US Top Gospel Albums (Billboard)	9
US Christian Albums (Billboard)	25
