= The Best of Me (Yolanda Adams album) =

Greatest hits album by Yolanda Adams
- Released: May 8, 2007
- Length: 60:13
- Label: Elektra, Atlantic

Yolanda Adams chronology
Day by Day (2005)	The Best of Me (2007)	What a Wonderful Time (2007)

Professional ratings
Review scores
Source	Rating
Allmusic	3.5/5 stars
Cross Rhythms	8/10 squares

The Best Of Me is a 2007 compilation album by Yolanda Adams. It is Adams' fifth consecutive number-one on the US Top Gospel Albums chart, debuting with sales of 12,000 in its first week and has since become her longest-charting on the US Top Gospel Albums chart, with a total of 210 weeks accumlated.

== Track listings ==
1. Victory 4:42
2. I Gotta Believe 3:39
3. Yeah 3:17
4. Open My Heart 5:40
5. This Too Shall Pass 4:58
6. Fragile Heart 4:38
7. Be Blessed 5:44
8. Continual Praise 4:28
9. Never Give Up 5:16
10. I Believe I Can Fly (duet with Gerald Levert) 5:59
11. In the Midst of It All 6:56
12. Someone’s Watching Over You 4:51

== Charts ==
=== Weekly charts ===
Charts	Peak position
US Billboard 200	60
US Top R&B/Hip-Hop Albums (Billboard)	9
US Top Gospel Albums (Billboard)	1

=== Year-end charts ===
Chart (2007)	Position
US Top Gospel Albums (Billboard)	23
Chart (2008)	Position
US Top Gospel Albums (Billboard)	43
Chart (2017)	Position
US Top Gospel Albums (Billboard)	37
Chart (2018)	Position
US Top Gospel Albums (Billboard)	41
Chart (2019)	Position
US Top Gospel Albums (Billboard)	23
Chart (2020)	Position
US Top Gospel Albums (Billboard)	19
Chart (2021)	Position
US Top Gospel Albums (Billboard)	31
Chart (2022)	Position
US Top Gospel Albums (Billboard)	31
Chart (2022)	Position
US Top Gospel Albums (Billboard)	36
