= Yolanda... Live in Washington =

Yolanda... Live In Washington

Live album by Yolanda Adams
- Released: June 1, 1996
- Venue: Jericho City of Praise
- Genre: Gospel
- Length: 72:03
- Label: Verity Records
- Producer: Ben Tankard; Yolanda Adams; Larry Day

Yolanda Adams chronology
More Than A Melody (1995)	Yolanda... Live In Washington (1996)	Songs from the Heart (1998)

Singles from Yolanda...Live In Washington
- 1. "The Battle Is the Lord's" Released: 1996

Professional ratings
Review scores
Source	Rating
Allmusic	3.5/5 stars
Cross Rhythms	6/10 squares
The Encyclopedia of Popular Music	4/5 stars

Yolanda... Live In Washington is an album by gospel singer Yolanda Adams. This album contains performances previously only available on live VHS concerts, as well as two studio tracks: "Praise Your Holy Name," and "Thank You." The latter was re-recorded on Adams' 2001 album Believe.

== Track listing ==
1. "The Only Way" (Fred Vaughn, Mervyn Warren) - 7:06
2. "Let Us Worship Him" (Armirris Palmore) - 7:05
3. "My Everything" (Yolanda Adams, Ben Tankard) - 5:38
4. "Just A Prayer Away" (Gregory Curtis) - 7:37
5. "The Battle Is the Lord's" (V. Michael McKay) - 6:29
6. "I'll Always Remember" (Armirris Palmore) - 9:09
7. "This Joy" (Pharis "June Bug" Evans Jr.) - 6:06
8. "Through The Storm" (V. Michael McKay) - 5:26
9. "Save The World" (Raymond Reeder) - 6:38
10. "Praise Your Holy Name" (Anson Dawkins, Crystal Odom, Derek Clark) - 4:35
11. "Thank You" (John Croslan II) - 6:15

== Personnel ==
- Yolanda Adams – vocals, producer
- Raymond Angry – keyboards
- Angela Bell – additional vocals
- Rodney Covington – additional vocals
- Rémy David – engineer
- Larry Day – producer
- Tyrone Dickerson – keyboards, producer, music director, choir director
- Juanita Edwards – additional vocals
- Anthony Harmon – bass
- Yomme Johnson – additional vocals
- Ann McCrary – additional vocals
- Gayle Mayes – additional vocals
- Armirris Palmore – additional vocals
- Angela Primm – additional vocals
- Desmond Pringle – additional vocals
- Phillip Ratliff – guitar
- Raymond Reeder – choir director
- Oscar Seaton – drums
- Sylvia Logan-Sharp – additional vocals
- Kevin Szymanski – assistant engineer
- Ben Tankard – producer, mixing
- Union Temple Youth – choir vocals
- Union Temple Concert – choir vocals
- Vanessa Williams – additional vocals
- Suzanne Young – additional vocals

== Charts ==
=== Weekly charts ===
Chart (1996)	Peak position
US Top Christian Albums (Billboard)	25
US Top Gospel Albums (Billboard)	5

=== Year-end charts ===
Chart (1996)	Peak position
US Top Gospel Albums (Billboard)	12
Chart (1997)	Peak position
US Top Gospel Albums (Billboard)	11
Chart (1998)	Peak position
US Top Gospel Albums (Billboard)	36
