= LeJuene Thompson =

- Born: Frances LeJuene Hayes; May 15, 1970 (age 56); Greensboro, North Carolina
- Origin: Charlotte, North Carolina
- Genres: gospel, Christian R&B, contemporary R&B, traditional black gospel, urban contemporary gospel
- Occupations: Singer, songwriter
- Instruments: vocals, singer-songwriter
- Years active: 1986–present
- Labels: EMI Gospel, Fontana, LeCe
- Formerly of: The Tri-City Singers
- Website: facebook.com/TheOfficialLeJueneThompson

LeJuene Thompson (born May 15, 1970, as Frances LeJuene Hayes) is an American gospel musician and artist. She started her music career in 2001 with the release of Soul Inspiration by EMI Gospel. This album was her breakthrough on the Billboard magazine charts, placing on the Gospel Albums and Christian Albums. Her second album, Metamorphosis, was released by LeCe Entertainment in 2008. She released her third album, Evolution of Me, with Fontana Records.

== Early life ==
Thompson was born on May 15, 1970, as Frances LeJuene Hayes, in Greensboro, North Carolina, as the ninth of ten siblings in her family. Her parents divorced, so while with her mother, she listened to religious music because her mom was a minister of evangelism. While at her fathers, she listened to secular music, and was captivated by the vocals of Al Green. Early on, she was a member of The Tri-City Singers, before she started her solo career.

== Music career ==
Her solo music career started in 2001, with the release of Soul Inspiration, and this released on September 25, 2001, by EMI Gospel. This was her breakthrough album on the Billboard magazine charts, which it placed at No. 17 on the Gospel Albums and at No. 40 on the Christian Albums. Mark Goodge, indicating in an eight out of ten review by Cross Rhythms magazine, replies, "The title may be a bit corny, but this excellent debut solo album from the former Tri-City Singers vocalist delivers exactly what it says on the tin." The second album, Metamorphosis, was released by LeCe Entertainment on February 2, 2008, yet this album failed to chart. Dancin' Dave Derbyshire, mentioning in an eight out of ten review from Cross Rhythms, responds, "With her eclectic blend of neo-soul styles LeJuene shows off her impressive vocals by effortlessly lifting the smooth sounds of some of the songs and belting out others." Her third album, Evolution of Me, released by Fontana Records in 2012, and again this did not chart.

== Personal life ==
Thompson is married to Cedric Thompson, who is a native of Anderson, South Carolina, and he is a Grammy Award and Stellar Award-winning music producer. The couple have three sons, Cedric Jr., Christopher, and Chandler, and they reside in Charlotte, North Carolina. Thompson is the founder and CEO of Buttrfly Girls that she launched on June 1, 2013. She along with her husband own and operate LeCe Entertainment.

== Discography ==
=== Studio albums ===
List of studio albums, with selected chart positions
Title	Album details	Peak chart positions	
Title	Album details	US Chr	US Gos
Soul Inspiration	Released: September 25, 2001; Label: EMI Gospel; CD, digital download	40	17
Metamorphosis	Released: February 2, 2008; Label: LeCe; CD, digital download	–	–
Evolution of Me	Released: 2012; Label: Fontana; CD, digital download	–	–
