= I'm Gonna Be Ready =

Single by Yolanda Adams

from the album Believe
- Released: 2002
- Recorded: 2001
- Length: 5:39
- Label: Elektra
- Songwriters: James Harris; James Wright; Terry Lewis; Yolanda Adams

Yolanda Adams singles chronology
"Never Give Up" (2001)	"I'm Gonna Be Ready" (2002)	"Someone Watching Over You" (2005)

"I'm Gonna Be Ready" is a song by American singer Yolanda Adams. The song was a single from her 2001 studio album Believe, her last album with major record label Elektra Records. The song charted on the US Billboard Adult R&B Songs chart, peaking at number 10. The song was heavily played on urban gospel radio.

== Charts ==
Chart (2001)	Peak position
US Adult R&B Songs (Billboard)	10
US Hot R&B/Hip-Hop Songs (Billboard)	74
