= The Best of Yolanda Adams =

Greatest hits album by Yolanda Adams
- Released: October 26, 1999
- Genre: Gospel
- Length: 74 mins
- Label: Legacy Recordings

Professional ratings
Review scores
Source	Rating
Allmusic	4/5 stars
Cross Rhythms	10/10 squares
The Encyclopedia of Popular Music	4/5 stars

The Best of Yolanda Adams is an album by gospel singer Yolanda Adams.

== Track listing ==
1. You Know That I Know 4:15
2. Through The Storm 4:56
3. Even Me 5:26
4. The Only Way 5:23
5. Just A Prayer Away 4:36
6. The Battle Is The Lord's 4:25
7. Let Us Worship Him 3:37
8. Save The World 4:57
9. Gotta Have Love 4:22
10. The Good Shepherd 5:59
11. What About the Children 5:19
12. More Than A Melody 4:32
13. Is Your All On The Altar? 5:41
14. Still I Rise 5:34
15. Only Believe 4:30

== Charts ==
=== Weekly charts ===
Chart (1999)	Peak position
US Top Gospel Albums (Billboard)	9
US Christian Albums (Billboard)	23

=== Year-end charts ===
Chart (2000)	Position
US Top Gospel Albums (Billboard)	13
Chart (2001)	Position
US Top Gospel Albums (Billboard)	22

== Certifications ==
Region	Certification	Certified units/sales
United States (RIAA)	Gold	500,000^{^}
^{^} Shipments figures based on certification alone.
