= Hedgeman =

Hedgeman is a surname. Notable people with the surname include:

- Anna Arnold Hedgeman (1899–1990), American civil rights leader and politician
- Ethel Hedgeman Lyle (1887–1950), American woman, founder of Alpha Kappa Alpha
- Javen Hedgeman, American college basketball player
- Jay Hedgeman, American college basketball player
- Lulah McEwen Hedgeman (1938–1997), American musician and educator
- Peyton Cole Hedgeman (1890–1973), American painter
