= Janice Gaines =

- Born: Janice Patrice Reddick; May 22, 1981 (age 45); St. Louis, Missouri, U.S.
- Origin: Memphis, Tennessee, U.S.
- Genre: Urban contemporary gospel
- Occupations: Singer, songwriter
- Instruments: vocals, singer-songwriter
- Years active: 2010–present
- Label: Motown Gospel
- Website: janicegaines.com

Janice Patrice Gaines (née: Reddick; born May 22, 1981) is a Stellar Award and GMA Dove Award-nominated American urban contemporary gospel singer and songwriter. Her debut singles, "Wait On You" and "The Break-Up Song," were released as an extended play album on April 14, 2015. Her debut album, "Greatest Life Ever," released on Motown Gospel, was produced by GRAMMY Award-winning producer LaShawn Daniels. and debuted in the Top 10 on the Billboard Top Gospel Albums chart.

== Early and personal life ==
Gaines was born, Janice Patrice Reddick, in St. Louis, Missouri, on May 22, 1981, but raised in Memphis, Tennessee. She grew up singing in church, where her father was a Methodist minister, Lawrence Lewis Reddick III, and her mother, a singer-songwriter/musician, Jacquelyn Reddick-Jones (née, Merriwether), and she has a brother, Jon. As a teenager, Gaines was the youngest member of the Memphis-based community choir O'Landa Draper & The Associates. Gaines attended Oberlin College in Oberlin, OH, during which time she sang background vocals for R&B singer Howard Hewett. Following college, Gaines attended Ashland Theological Seminary, where she received a Masters of Divinity, before moving to New York City to teach seventh-grade math in the Bronx. She presently resides in Franklin, Tennessee, with her husband, Erik Justin "E.J." Gaines.

== Music career ==
In 2010, Janice Gaines began touring the nation as a member of the Worship Team for Women of Faith, a Christian-based live events organization. Following the 2012 release of her debut single, "One Day," Gaines caught the attention of Motown Gospel president Ken Pennell, who later signed her to a recording agreement.

In December 2014, Janice Gaines was featured on the Motown Christmas album, singing a duet with GRAMMY Award-nominated R&B/soul singer Kem (singer) on the song "Bethlehem."

In 2015, Motown Gospel released two singles from Janice Gaines-- "Wait On You" and "The Break-Up Song". "Wait On You" peaked at No. 21 on Billboard's Hot Gospel Songs chart. Her debut album, Greatest Life Ever, produced by GRAMMY Award-winning producer LaShawn Daniels, was released on October 9, 2015, and debuted at No. 7 on Billboard's Top Gospel Albums chart.

In 2016, Janice Gaines earned her first GMA Dove Award nomination for her debut single, "Wait On You," in the Contemporary Gospel/Urban Recorded Song of the Year category. In 2017, Gaines earned her first Stellar Award nomination for Contemporary Female Vocalist of the Year.

== Discography ==
List of musical projects, with selected chart positions
Title	Project details	Peak chart positions	
Title	Project details	US	US Gos
Greatest Life Ever	Released: October 9, 2015; Label: Motown Gospel; CD, digital download	–	7

Singles

Year	Single	Chart Positions
Year	Single	Gos
2015	"Wait On You"	21
2015	"The Break-Up Song"	–
2014	"Bethlehem" (featuring Kem (singer))	–

=== Awards ===
==== GMA Dove Awards ====
Year	Award	Result
47th GMA Dove Awards (2016)	Contemporary Gospel/Urban Recorded Song of the Year	Nominated

==== Stellar Awards ====
Year	Award	Result
Stellar Awards (2016)	Contemporary Female Vocalist of the Year	Nominated
