= Lulah =

Lulah is a feminine given name. Notable people with the name include:

- Lulah McEwen Hedgeman (1938–1997), American musician and educator
- Lulah Ragsdale (1861–1953), American poet, novelist, and actor
- Rosetta Lulah Baume (1871–1934), American-born New Zealand teacher, feminist and community leader
