= Songs from the Heart (Yolanda Adams album) =

Studio album by Yolanda Adams
- Released: September 15, 1998
- Genre: Gospel
- Length: 52:08
- Label: Verity
- Producer: Percy Bady, Gregory Curtis

Yolanda Adams chronology
Yolanda... Live In Washington (1996)	Songs from the Heart (1998)	Mountain High... Valley Low (1999)

Singles from Songs from the Heart
- 1. "Still I Rise " Released: 1998

Professional ratings
Review scores
Source	Rating
Allmusic	link
Cross Rhythms	5/10 squares
The Encyclopedia of Popular Music	4/5 stars

Songs From The Heart is an album by gospel singer Yolanda Adams. Songs included the single "Still I Rise," dedicated to Rosa Parks, and interpolated from a poem by Maya Angelou. This was Adams' final album for the Verity Records label before signing with Elektra Records and gaining mainstream fame with her follow-up album Mountain High...Valley Low.

== Track listing ==
1. Only Believe (Adams, G. Curtis) 4:29
2. Is Your All on the Altar (Elisha Hoffman) 5:43
3. Still I Rise (Percy Bady) 5:42
4. Never Alone 3:25
5. Jesus Medley: Jesus is All/Oh How He Loves You and Me/Oh How I Love Jesus (F. Whitfield, Will Lamartine Thompson) 8:39
6. God Will Take Care of You (Adams, G. Curtis) 4:12
7. Lord, I Want To Be A Christian 5:11
8. Know Him (D. Frazier) 5:17
9. Come to Me (A. Palmore) 4:53
10. His Presence is Here (D. Frazier) 4:50

*God Will Take Care of You samples the hymn of the same title written by Civilla D. Martin.

== Charts ==
=== Weekly charts ===
Chart (1998)	Peak position
US Top Christian Albums (Billboard)	9
US Heatseekers Albums (Billboard)	15
US Top Gospel Albums (Billboard)	3

=== Year-end charts ===
Chart (1998)	Peak position
US Top Gospel Albums (Billboard)	6
Chart (1999)	Peak position
US Top Gospel Albums (Billboard)	14
