= More Than a Melody =

Studio album by Yolanda Adams
- Released: October 1995
- Genre: Gospel
- Length: 49:35
- Label: Tribute Records
- Producer: Ben Tankard, BeBe Winans

Yolanda Adams chronology
Save the World (1993)	More Than a Melody (1995)	Yolanda... Live in Washington (1996)

Singles from More Than a Melody
- 1. "Open Arms" Released: 1995; 2. "Gotta Have Love" Released: 1995; 3. "Fly Like an Eagle" Released: 1995

Professional ratings
Review scores
Source	Rating
AllMusic	link
Cross Rhythms	7/10 squares
The Encyclopedia of Popular Music	3/5 stars
Muzik	4/5 stars

More Than a Melody is the fourth studio album by gospel singer Yolanda Adams. The album includes singles such as "Gotta Have Love" (for which a commercial cassette single and video were both released) and a cover of the Steve Miller classic "Fly Like an Eagle". The album also includes musical collaborations with O'Landa Draper on "The Good Shepherd" and BeBe Winans on "What About the Children". The album was released on Tribute Records.

== Track listing ==
1. "Open Arms" (Parkes Stewart, Charles Harris) 4:06
2. "Trust and Believe" (Adams, Ben Tankard) 5:49
3. "The Good Shepherd" (V. Michael McKay) 5:58
4. "Gotta Have Love" (Adams, Brian Overton, Khalid Keene, Ted Howard, Terrence Jones) 4:25
5. "What About the Children?" (BeBe Winans) 5:19
6. "More Than a Melody" (Aaron Lindsey, Stewart) 4:57
7. "My Desire" (Adams, Michael Coston, Ted Howard) 4:42
8. "Take Away" (V. Michael McKay) 5:07
9. "Fly Like an Eagle" (Medley) (Steve Miller / Adams, Tankard) 4:06
10. "You Changed My Life" (duet with Doug Williams) (Tankard, Marquis Hunt) 5:08

== Charts ==
=== Weekly charts ===
Chart (1995)	Peak position
US Top Christian Albums (Billboard)	4
US Top Gospel Albums (Billboard)	4

=== Year-end charts ===
Chart (1996)	Peak position
US Top Gospel Albums (Billboard)	15
