= O'Landa Draper =

American singer (1963–1998)

- Born: September 29, 1963
- Origin: Memphis, Tennessee, United States
- Died: July 21, 1998 (aged 34)
- Genres: Gospel
- Occupations: Choir director, songwriter, singer, musician
- Years active: 1986–1998
- Labels: Word, Warner
- Formerly of: Hezekiah Walker, Kirk Franklin, Billy Joel, Ricky Dillard, Donald Lawrence, Albertina Walker, Shirley Caesar, Yolanda Adams, Beverly Crawford, Carlton Pearson

O'Landa Draper (September 29, 1963 – July 21, 1998) was an American Grammy Award-winning Gospel music artist. He was the founder of the Associates Choir and is considered to be one of the top gospel artists of the 1990s. Draper was nominated for the Grammy Award, Stellar Awards and the Dove Award multiple times.

Draper was known for his choir directing style. Draper's work include "My Soul Doth Magnify the Lord", "I See my Miracle", "Lift the Savior Up", "Stand Up", "Gotta Feelin'", and "He Touched Me".

== Early life ==
Draper grew up in Alabama and Washington, D.C., listening to gospel music as a child. His late mother, Marie Draper, was a gospel music promoter and artist, and was a main reason for his fascination in the genre. When he was 13, he moved to Memphis and attended Overton High School (Memphis, Tennessee) where he joined a glee club led by Lulah Hedgeman. He began to write and sing gospel music in the club. After he finished his musical studies in high school, he moved on to the Memphis State where he directed the school's choir. After school he would work part-time for FedEx.

In 1986, he formed his own choir and named them "The Associates" in Memphis, Tennessee. Gospel artists such as Earnest Pugh and Janice Gaines were once members of The Associates.

== Musical career ==
In 1988, gospel great Shirley Caesar used O`landa Draper and the Associates to back her up on her first live recorded music video and one year later on her blockbuster `I Remember Mama`album on the `Word records` label. Caesar went to her record label and shortly after, Draper and the choir were immediately signed to the Word Recordslabel and recorded their first album, Do It Again in 1990. Their second album, Above and Beyond, was their first Grammy-nominated album. The choir went on performing across the United States, making television appearances, performing for presidents such as Jimmy Carter, George H. W. Bush and Bill Clinton. The choir also sang back up for Billy Joel during the 1994 Grammy Awards, performed with celebrities such as actress Jennifer Holliday, performer B.B. King and other gospel artists such as Albertina Walker, Beverly Crawford and Shirley Caesar. Draper has also collaborated with Christian Contemporary Artists such as Russ Taff and Steven Curtis Chapman, specifically during the 1994 Dove Awards. Draper hosted gospel workshops around the world in nations such as Europe and in countries such as the Bahamas. He recorded a live workshop that took place in 1994 in Memphis, Tennessee. It featured artist such as Kirk Franklin and Yolanda Adams. In that same year, Draper recorded Live: A Celebration of Praise, his second Grammy-nominated album. The album's well known song "My Soul Doth Magnify the Lord" was the only song recorded for VHS.

In 1996, Draper recorded for Warner Music Group and released his third Grammy-nominated live album Gotta Feelin which debuted at No. 2 on the Billboard Magazine Gospel Album's chart. The album was also recorded for VHS. The song "Gotta Feelin'" was featured in WOW Gospel 1998, the first Gospel album of the WOW series and the song also made its public debut during Azusa 1996, a popular convention at the time hosted by Bishop Carlton Pearson. In 1998, Draper released his last album before his passing, Reflections. The album won the Grammy Award for Best Gospel Choir or Chorus Album in 1999.

== Death and legacy ==
On July 21, 1998, only a few weeks after the release of his recording of Reflections, Draper died of renal failure.

In 2000, the Associates choir, led by his fiancée Patrina Smith, recorded their last album All About Him (Jesus) in Memphis, Tennessee. The album introduces new songs such as "All about Him", "Clean Me Up" and old favorites such as "My Soul Doth Magnify the Lord". The song "I'll See You Again" is a song dedicated to Draper and his legacy. The album was nominated for the Grammy Award for Best Gospel Choir or Chorus Album in 2002.

Gospel artist Hezekiah Walker, in a tribute to Draper, performed "I've Got a Reason to Praise the Lord" in his live recording album Family Affair in 1999. He renamed the song "I've Got a Reason (Draper's Legacy)." Gospel Artist Earnest Pugh also paid tribute to Draper in his 2013 album, The W.I.N. (Worship in Nassau) Experience. The 13-minute medley featured other Gospel artists such as Shirley Caesar, LeJuene Thompson, Vincent Tharpe and Kenosis and Angel Bigelow-Davis.

In 2010, the Brat Pack, a Gospel group that started in the 1990s that consisted of individual gospel artists' Hezekiah Walker, Donald Lawrence, and Ricky Dillard, reunited to perform during the Gospel Music Workshop of America. They performed Draper's song "My Soul Doth Magnify the Lord". In 2016, the Stellar Awards honored him with the Rev. James Cleveland Lifetime Achievement Award. Ricky Dillard, Donald Lawrence and Hezekiah Walker along with the Associates sang some of his greatest hits. His sister and nephew accepted the award on his behalf.

In 2018, Draper was inducted into the Memphis Music Hall of Fame.

== Discography ==
- Do It Again, 1990
- Above and Beyond, 1991
- All The Bases, 1993
- Live: A Celebration of Praise, 1994
- Gotta Feelin', 1996
- Reflections, 1998
- All About Him (Jesus), 2001 (Posthumous)

== In popular culture ==
The theme song to the Canadian drama series Degrassi: The Next Generation is derived from O'Landa Draper's "Whatever It Takes"; many versions were made for almost each new season.
