= Believe (Yolanda Adams album) =

Studio album by Yolanda Adams
- Released: December 4, 2001
- Genre: Gospel
- Length: 53:31
- Label: Elektra
- Producers: Kevin Bond; Louis Brown; Buster & Shavoni; Warryn Campbell; Mike City; Shep Crawford; Drop Squad; Jimmy Jam & Terry Lewis; James "Big Jim" Wright

Yolanda Adams chronology
The Experience (2001)	Believe (2001)	Day By Day (2005)

Singles from Believe
- 1. "Never Give Up" Released: October 30, 2001; 2. "I'm Gonna Be Ready " Released: 2002

Believe is the eighth studio album by American singer Yolanda Adams. It was released by Elektra Records on December 4, 2001, in the United States. The album features the singles "Never Give Up" and "I'm Gonna Be Ready". The track "Fo' Sho'" was done with labelmate Karen Clark-Sheard and was Sheard's first release after her near death experience. The first track, "Never Give Up", is said to be a response to the September 11 attacks. The album sold 67,000 copies in its best week in January 2002 and was certified Gold by the Recording Industry Association of America (RIAA). As of 2019, the album has sold over 700,000 units. This was Adams' final release on Elektra before the company folded.

== Critical reception ==
Professional ratings
Review scores
Source	Rating
AllMusic	2.5/5 stars
Cross Rhythms	9/10 squares
The Encyclopedia of Popular Music	2/5 stars
New York Post	0.5/4 stars
USA Today	3/4 stars

AllMusic editor Liana Jonas found that "most of the fare on Believe [is] plagued by formulaic R&B and gospel arrangements, predictable key changes and progressions, and less-than-moving lyrics. The album does not justly showcase Adams' fullest vocal potential, which, to be sure, she has in spades based on past recordings. Adams should secure better songwriters and producers. Without them, her many talents go wasted. She can and should do better." New York Post critic Dan Aquilante called Believe "the cutting edge of a brick," criticizing its dull arrangements and lack of energy. He praised only "I'm Thankful" as "a lively song," but otherwise described the album as "a yawn, a waste of a formidable voice."

== Track listing ==
Credits taken from the album's liner notes.

No.	Title	Writer(s)	Producer(s)	Length
1.	"Never Give Up"	Yolanda Adams; Terry Lewis; James Harris III; James Wright	Jimmy Jam & Terry Lewis; Wright^{[A]}	5:17
2.	"I Gotta Believe"	Shep Crawford; Damon Crawford; Ishmael Ferguson	Drop Squad; Crawford	3:41
3.	"Fo' Sho'" (featuring Karen Clark Sheard)	Crawford	Crawford	3:27
4.	"Thank You"	V. Michael McKay	Kevin Bond	5:11
5.	"A Song of Faith"	Michael Flowers	Mike City	4:22
6.	"Unconditional"	Flowers	City	3:40
7.	"Anything"	Adams; Erica Campbell; Tina Campbell; Warryn Campbell; John "Jubu" Smith	W. Campbell	4:29
8.	"Only If God Says Yes"	Bond	Bond	4:50
9.	"Since the Last Time I Saw You"	V. McKay	Bond	3:46
10.	"I'm Gonna Be Ready"	Adams; Harris; Lewis; Wright	Jam & Lewis; Wright^{[A]}	5:39
11.	"Darling Girl"	Adams; Bobby Ross Avila; Issiah J. "Iz" Avila; Louis "Buster" Brown; Scott "Shavoni" Parker	Buster & Shavoni	4:18
12.	"I'm Thankful" (featuring T-Bone)	Adams; Harris; Lewis; Wright; Grant Nicholas; Etienne Clark; Rene Sotomayor	Jam & Lewis; Nicholas; Lil Nick; Wright^{[A]}	4:14

Notes

- ^{^[A]} denotes co-producer

== Charts ==
=== Weekly charts ===
Chart (2001–02)	Peak position
US Billboard 200	42
US Top Christian Albums (Billboard)	2
US Top Gospel Albums (Billboard)	1
US Top R&B/Hip-Hop Albums (Billboard)	7

=== Year-end charts ===
Chart (2002)	Position
US Billboard 200	133
US Top R&B/Hip-Hop Albums (Billboard)	29
US Top Gospel Albums (Billboard)	2
US Christian Albums (Billboard)	5
Chart (2003)	Position
US Top Gospel Albums (Billboard)	11

=== Decade-end charts ===
Chart (2000–2009)	Peak position
US Top Gospel Albums (Billboard)	6

== Certifications ==
Region	Certification	Certified units/sales
United States (RIAA)	Gold	700,000
