= Phil and Brenda Nicholas =

Nicholas
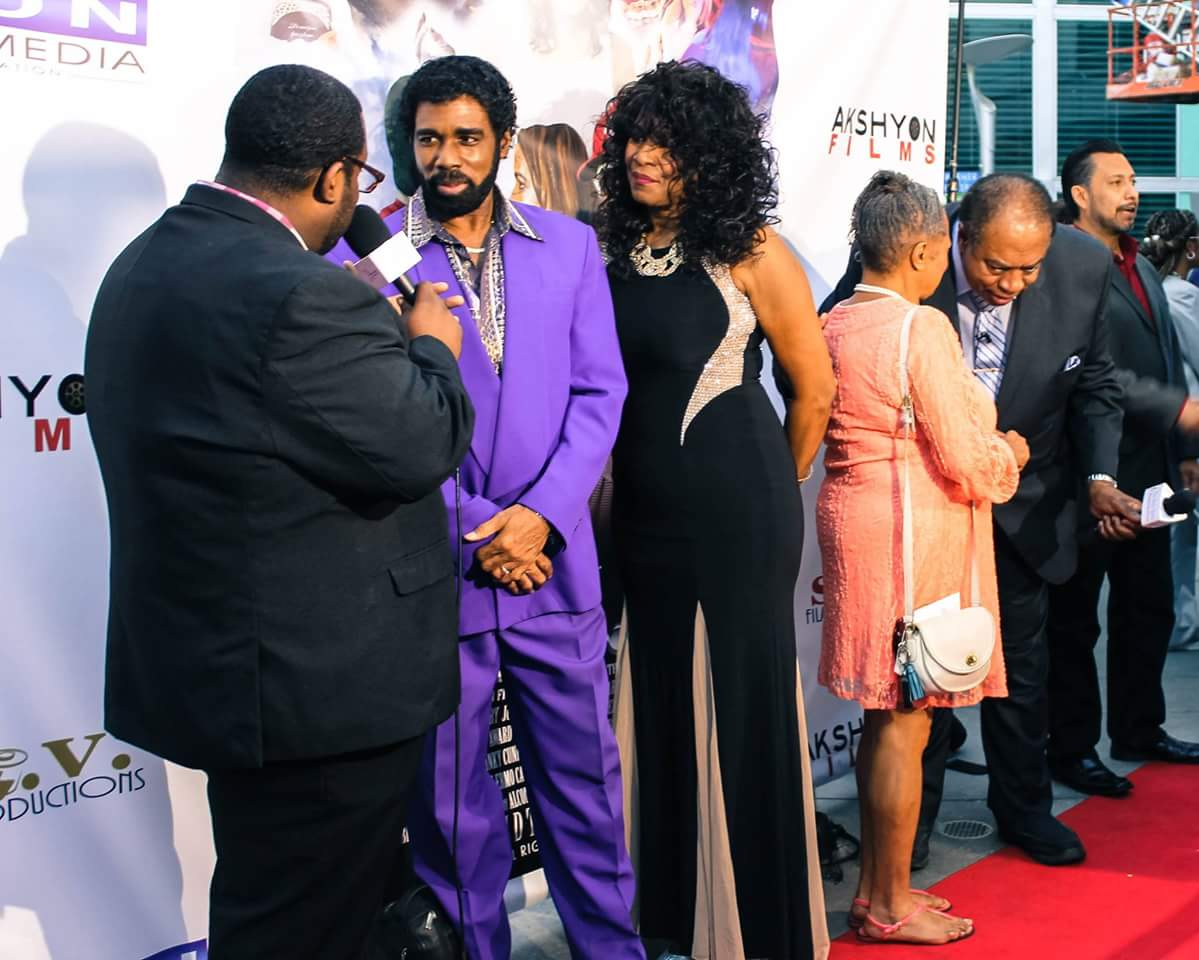
- Phil and Brenda on the Red carpet 2016

Background information
- Origin: Philadelphia, Pennsylvania; Los Angeles, California
- Genres: CCM, gospel, urban contemporary gospel, traditional black gospel
- Years active: 1981–present
- Labels: Message, Command
- Members: Brenda Nicholas; Philip Nicholas
- Website: philandbrendanicholas.com

Philip Nicholas and Brenda Nicholas née Watson, known mononymously as the gospel duo Nicholas, are an African-American husband and wife gospel duo who hail from Philadelphia PA, and Penns Grove, NJ, respectively. Dubbed the sweethearts of gospel, the duo is credited with being the originators of Christian love songs which helped change church culture concerning marriage and relationships. Nicholas has won and been nominated for numerous awards including Grammy, Dove, and Stellar awards. In 1981, they began their gospel music career as a quartet with the release of Tell the World on Message Records. This album yielded their first radio hit "God's Woman". In 1983 Nicholas recorded Words Can't Express, also released on Message Records. This was the duo's last album with Message though Words Can't Express broke into the Billboard Top Gospel Albums chart. The duo then launched their new label, Command Records. Their 1985 debut release for the label, Dedicated, reached the number-one spot on the Gospel Album chart and was Billboard's #1 Gospel album of the year 1986. Nicholas released nine more albums. Four of the albums—A Love Like This (1987), Live in Memphis (1989), More than Music (1990), and Back to Basics (1992)—all placed on the Billboard Top Gospel Albums chart. In 1994, the duo released Fired Up!.

== Background ==
Philip Nicholas, the son of a jazz musician, was born in Philadelphia. The elder Nicholas eventually became a minister of music. While in high school, Philip learned to play the piano, a skill he utilized when he joined the family band known as The Nicholas Chorale Ensemble. Philip's brother, Lonnie, and his nephews, Steve and Ira Jackson, were also members of the ensemble.

After graduating from high school Philip enrolled at Drexel University where he met his future wife, Brenda Watson. Because she was an early morning shower songstress, Watson’s dorm mate introduced Philip to Brenda with the hope that Brenda would join Philip's singing group and give the dormitory floor well-earned relief from Brenda's early morning shower concerts. Eventually, Brenda and Philip merged their personal and professional lives. The two married on February 18, 1978, which was also Philip's 24th birthday.

The newly married duo settled in Los Angeles, where they became ministers of music at the church of renowned pastor Dr. E.V. Hill. While in Los Angeles the two coined the group name Nicholas and decided to pursue careers as professional music artists. In 1981, Philip and his brother, Lonnie Nicholas, established their own record label, Message Records. Because the brothers had different ideas over the label's direction, Philip left Message and created Command Records with ex-Motown producer, Kent Washburn.

== History ==
The duo, although a quartet at this time, released the album entitled Tell the World in 1981, Words Can't Express in 1983, Dedicated in 1985 and "A Love Like This" in 1987. Word's Can't Express, Dedicated and "A Love Like This" , charted, reaching No.10, No. 1 and No. 2, respectively, on the Billboard Top Gospel Albums chart.

The remaining albums released by the duo were 1988's Live in Memphis, 1990's More than Music, 1991's Back to Basics, 1993's The Inspirational Sounds of Nicholas Vol. 1, and The Contemporary Sounds of Nicholas Vol. 2, 1994's Fired Up!. Most of these albums charted nationally: A Live Like This at No. 2, Live in Memphis at No. 10, More than Music at No. 14, and Back to Basics at No. 12.

== Members ==
- Philip W. Nicholas (born February 18, 1954, in Philadelphia, Pennsylvania)
- Brenda L. Nicholas (née Watson) (born December 16, 1953, in Salem, New Jersey)

== Discography ==
List of selected albums, with selected chart positions
Title	Album details	Peak chart position
Title	Album details	US Gospel
Words Can't Express	Released: 1983; Label: Message; vinyl	10
Dedicated	Released: 1985; Label: Command; vinyl	1
A Love Like This	Released: 1987; Label: Command; vinyl	2
Live in Memphis	Released: 1988; Label: Command; vinyl	10
More than Music	Released: 1990; Label: Command; CD	14
Back to Basics	Released: 1991; Label: Command; CD	12
