= The Battle Is the Lord's =

Single by Yolanda Adams

from the album Save the World and Yolanda... Live in Washington
- Released: 1993; 1996 (live version)
- Recorded: 1993; 1996 (live version)
- Genre: Gospel
- Length: 4:24; 6:28 (live version)
- Label: Verity
- Songwriter(s): V. Michael McKay

Yolanda Adams singles chronology
"The Battle Is the Lord's" (1993)	"Gotta Have Love" (1995)

"The Battle Is the Lord's" is a song by American singer Yolanda Adams. It was the lead single from her 1993 album Save the World. It was named Song of the Year at the Stellar Awards in 1994, where it also won Adams the award for Traditional Solo Performance — Female. A later live recording was included on her Grammy-nominated album Yolanda... Live in Washington (1996). The performance of this song was later featured on her DVD An Unforgettable Evening with Yolanda Adams in 2003.

== Charts ==
=== Weekly charts ===
Chart (2002–2019)	Peak position
US Adult R&B Songs (Billboard)	20
US Gospel Digital Songs (Billboard)	12
US Gospel Streaming Songs (Billboard)	20
US Hot R&B/Hip-Hop Songs (Billboard)	75

== Certifications ==
Region	Certification	Certified units/sales
United States (RIAA)	Gold	500,000^{‡}
^{‡} Sales+streaming figures based on certification alone.
