= Ben Tankard =

American musician (born 1964)

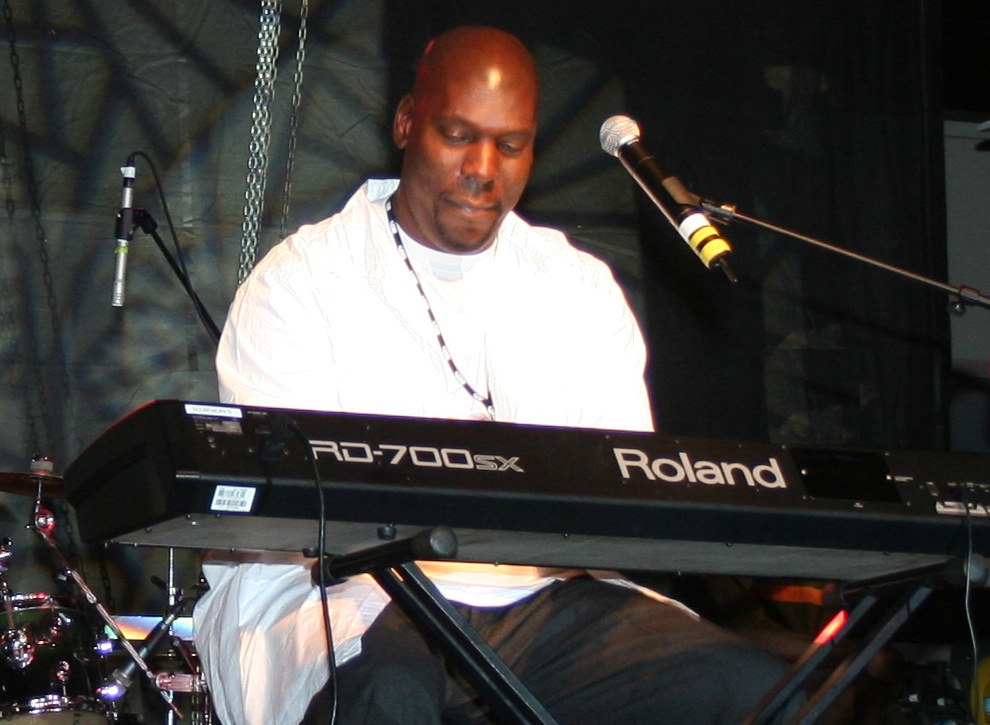
- Tankard in 2009

Background information
- Born: January 10, 1964 (age 62); Daytona Beach, Florida, United States
- Genres: Contemporary gospel, smooth jazz
- Occupation: Musician
- Instrument: Keyboards
- Years active: 1990s–present
- Labels: Tribute, Sony Music, Verity
- Website: bentankard.me

Ben Tankard (born January 10, 1964) is an American gospel/smooth jazz musician, producer, and arranger, former professional basketball player and reality tv Dad.

== Biography ==
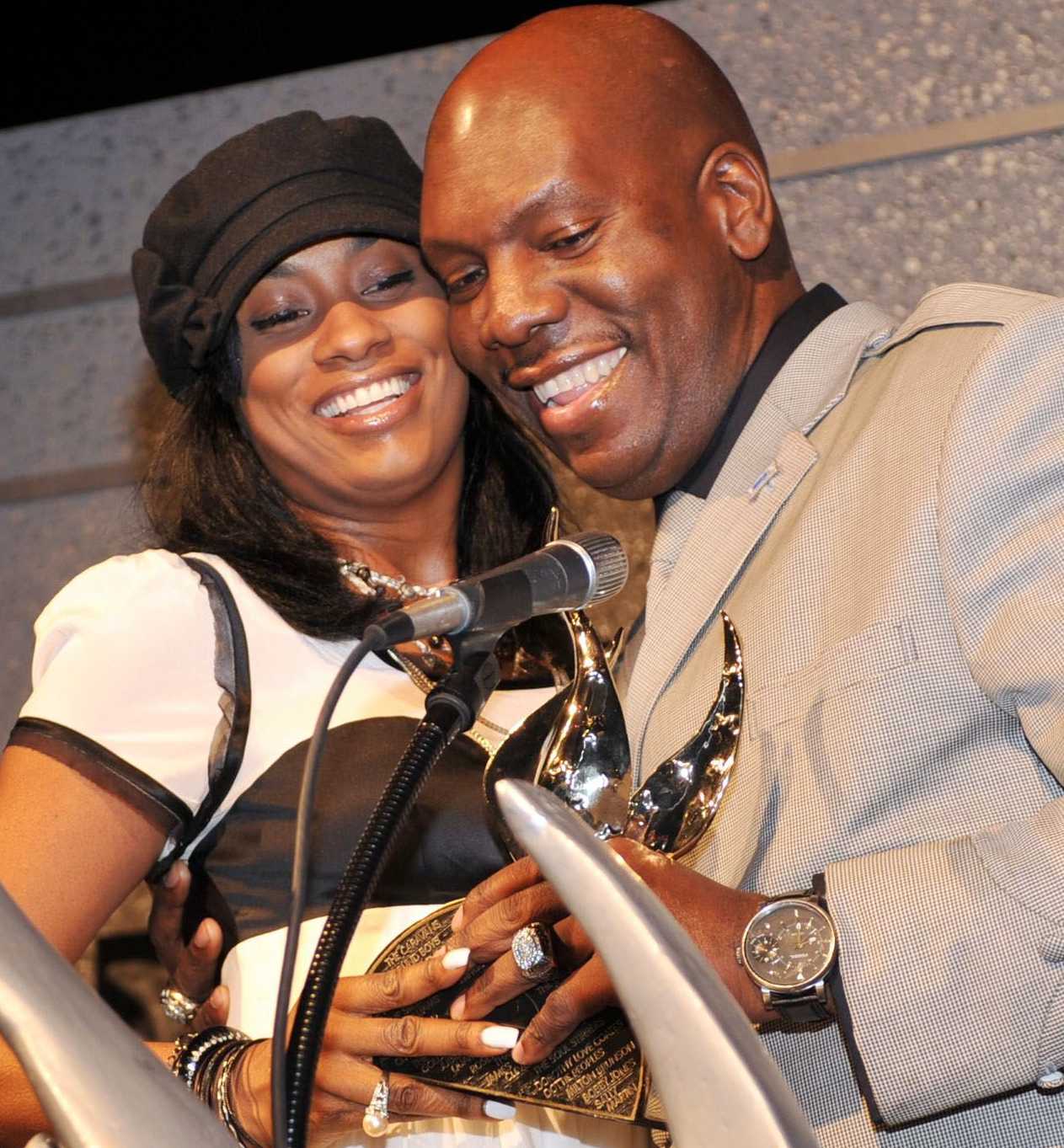
Ben and Jewel Tankard receiving Stellar Award, 2010

Tankard's father was a minister and his mother a missionary. In church, he played drums at an early age. He played tuba in school and received a basketball scholarship. Although he was invited to an NBA camp, he hurt his knee before the season started. During a period of homelessness, he went to church and was inspired by a revival service to turn his life around. He began playing keyboards, recorded Keynote Speaker (1990) for Tribute, and started to learn about arranging and record production. He has worked with Gerald Albright, Twinkie Clark, Fred Hammond, John P. Kee, Shirley Murdock, Kelly Price, and Take 6.

Tankard discovered a third-grade school teacher named Yolanda Adams and signed her to his indy Tribute label. He produced her albums Through the Storm, Save the World, More Than A Melody, and Yolanda... Live in Washington. They collaborated on over 40 compositions. He credits her voice for helping to bring his production style and keyboard playing to a large audience.

He won Stellar Awards' Best Instrumental Album in 2010 for Mercy, Mercy, Mercy.

In 2012, Ben Tankard/ Full Tank was nominated by the Soul Train Music Awards for Best Contemporary Jazz Artist.

Thicker Than Water is an American reality television series that premiered on November 10, 2013, on Bravo. The series chronicles the family dynamic of former professional basketball player and an American gospel-jazz instrumentalist Ben Tankard, his wife Jewel and their children. Bravo previously aired a pilot titled Thicker Than Water: The Marinos in August 2011 that had the same premise but centered on a different family.

In April 2014, Bravo renewed Thicker Than Water for a second season, which premiered on January 4, 2015.

In February 2016, Bravo renewed Thicker Than Water for a third season that premiered on March 27, 2016.

== Discography ==
- All Keyed Up (1989)
- Keynote Speaker (1990)
- Keys to Life (1991)
- An Instrumental Christmas (1991)
- Sunday Drivin (1993)
- Play Me in Your Key (1994)
- Instrumentally Yours (1996)
- Git Yo Prayze On w/Tribe of Benjamin (1997)
- Raize Da Praise by Tribe of Benjamin (1999)
- The Minstrel (1999)
- Christmas Love (2000)
- Song of Solomon (2001)
- Play a Lil' Song for Me (2003)
- Piano Prophet (2004)
- Let's Get Quiet: The Smooth Jazz Experience (2007)
- Mercy, Mercy, Mercy (2009)
- Full Tank (2012)
- Thicker Than Water-The Church Picnic (2013)
- Full Tank 2 (2015)
- Full Tank 3: CanTANKerous (2017)
- Rise! (2018)
- Shine! (2021)
- The Godfather Collection (2024)
- Re-Imagined Songbook (2025)
- Morning Prayers (Quiet Reflections) (2026)
