= Just as I Am (Yolanda Adams album) =

Studio album by Yolanda Adams
- Released: September 22, 1987
- Genre: Gospel
- Length: 33:55
- Label: Nine; Sound of Gospel
- Producer: Thomas Whitfield; Lamar Brantley

Yolanda Adams chronology
Just as I Am (1987)	Through the Storm (1991)

Professional ratings
Review scores
Source	Rating
The Encyclopedia of Popular Music	4/5 stars

Just as I Am is the debut studio album by American gospel singer Yolanda Adams. It was released by the Sound of Gospel on September 22, 1987 in the United States. Production was helmed by Thomas Whitfield, who also worked with singer Vanessa Bell Armstrong on early 1980s gospel releases. Though original pressings of the vinyl and cassette release are difficult to find, the album has since been re-released on CD along with another catalog album from Sound of Gospel by Wanda Nero Butler entitled New Born Soul.

== Track listing ==
No.	Title	Writer(s)	Length
1.	"I Am"	Michael McKay	3:20
2.	"Restore Me"	Thomas Whitfield	4:01
3.	"Signs of the Time"	Jonathan DuBose	3:32
4.	"Just as I Am"	Whitfield	3:43
5.	"Come and Go with Me"	Whitfield; Gregory Troy	4:30
6.	"Wash Me"	Carl Preacher; Whitfield	5:55
7.	"If You Can Take It You Can Make It"	Whitfield; Yolanda Adams	4:16
8.	"Deliverance"	Adams; Whitfield	4:11

== Personnel ==
- Produced by Thomas Whitfield and Lanar Brantley
- Executive Producer: Armen Boladian
- Thomas Whitfield — keyboards, Baldwin & Yamaha pianos; string and synthesizer arrangements and overdubs; all vocal and instrumental arrangements
- Earl J. Wright — synthesizer overdubs; string arrangements programming
- Lanar Brantley — bass guitar; instrumental arrangements; exclusive drum programming and arrangements
- Jonathan DuBose — lead & rhythm guitars; bass section on "Deliverance"
- Larry Fratangelo — percussions exclusively
- Raphael Merriweather Jr. — percussion overdubs
- Walter L. Stevenson Jr. — vocal overdubs and tambourine on "Deliverance" (see YouTube page for artist's artistic portfolio)
- Singers — Sandy Hudson, Michael Fletcher, Doretha Carter, Renee Thomas, Larry D. Edwards, Juliette Cooper, Gwen Morton, Ron Kelley, Valerie Hancox, Larry McMurtry, Thomas Whitfield

== Charts ==
=== Weekly charts ===
Chart (1987)	Peak position
US Top Gospel Albums (Billboard)	8

=== Year-end charts ===
Chart (1988)	Peak position
US Top Gospel Albums (Billboard)	12
