= Milton Brunson =

American musician (1929–1997)

- Also known as: Rev. Milton Brunson
- Born: Milton R. Brunson; June 28, 1929; Chicago, Illinois
- Died: April 1, 1997 (aged 67) Chicago, Illinois
- Genres: gospel, black gospel, traditional black gospel
- Occupations: Singer, songwriter
- Instruments: vocals, singer-songwriter
- Years active: 1947–1997
- Labels: Nashboro, Word, Epic, A&M, Myrrh, Hob, Benson
- Formerly of: Thompson Community Singers ("The Tommies"), Thomas A. Dorsey, Mahalia Jackson, Robert Johnson, Ricky Dillard, Jessy Dixon

Milton R. Brunson (June 28, 1929 – April 1, 1997) was an American gospel musician and former pastor and music director of Christ Tabernacle Baptist Church in Chicago, Illinois. Brunson released his first musical project in 1988, Available to You. The title track has become a gospel standard.

He won a Grammy Award for Best Gospel Choir or Chorus Album at the 37th Annual Grammy Awards, while he was nominated two other times. He had ten albums that have charted on the Billboard Gospel Albums chart over the course of his career and some even after his death. He received a nomination for the Best Gospel Album, Group or Choir at the 1988 Soul Train Music Awards and for Best Gospel Album at the 1993 Soul Train Music Awards.

== Biography ==
=== Early life ===
Brunson was born on June 28, 1929, in Chicago, Illinois. His father was a stockyard worker, while his mother was a music and religion teacher. After he graduated from McKinley High School, he pursued a career in music by getting trained by Thomas A. Dorsey, Mahalia Jackson, and Robert Johnson, to hone his craft in the arts. He eventually became an ordained minister in 1964, and founded, pastored, and was the music director at Christ Tabernacle Baptist Church in Chicago, Illinois.

=== Career ===
His music career started in 1947, at the age of 18 by learning his craft from Thomas A. Dorsey, Mahalia Jackson, and Robert Johnson. After this mentoring process, he started the Thompson Community Singers (nicknamed, "The Tommies"), that appeared on several episodes of the Jubilee Showcase. They played Grant Park during the Chicago Gospel Music Festival and at the Apollo Theater and at Madison Square Garden in New York City. From this, they received enough recognition to play in England, Italy, and many other countries around the world. Brunson and the Thompson Community Singers released twenty-two musical projects, and a few of those were released posthumously. Ten albums got charted on the Billboard Gospel Albums chart, with five of them achieving the top spot on the chart. They received numerous accolades ranging from a nomination for the Best Gospel Album, Group or Choir at the 1988 Soul Train Music Awards and for Best Gospel Album at the 1993 Soul Train Music Awards. In addition, they won a Grammy Award for Best Gospel Choir or Chorus Album at the 37th Annual Grammy Awards, while they were nominated two other times. The Thompson Community Singers boasts some notable alumni particularly, Darius Brooks, Ricky Dillard, and Jessy Dixon.

=== Death ===
Brunson died at his residence in Chicago, Illinois, on April 1, 1997. He is interred at Oakridge Cemetery in Hillside, Illinois.

== Personal life ==
Brunson was married to Joann Brunson. They had three children together: two daughters, Donna Louise and Lavitia, and a son, Kevin.

== Legacy ==
His last album, When You Get High on Jesus, Oh My God, released in 1997 by Hob Records, was a posthumous release. He has a post office branch and school named after him in Austin, a neighborhood on Chicago's West Side. He has gained notoriety for his seemingly random inclusion in a custom Jeopardy board played by YouTubers Bengal and GiraffeNeckMarc.

== Discography ==
List of selected studio albums, with selected chart positions
Title	Album details	Peak chart positions
Title	Album details	US Gos
Miracle Live	Released: 1984; Label: A&M; CD, digital download	6
There Is Hope	Released: 1986; Label: Word; CD, digital download	1
If I Be Lifted	Released: 1987; Label: Word; CD, digital download	1
Available to You	Released: 1988; Label: Word/Epic; CD, digital download	1
Open Our Eyes	Released: 1990; Label: Word/Epic; CD, digital download	1
My Mind Is Made Up	Released: 1991; Label: Word; CD, digital download	1
Through God's Eyes	Released: 1993; Label: Word; CD, digital download	4
Shout	Released: 1995; Label: Word; CD, digital download	5
He's Still Good	Released: 1997; Label: Word; CD, digital download	9
50 Blessed Years	Released: 1998; Label: Word; CD, digital download	24
