= Becoming (Yolanda Adams album) =

Studio album by Yolanda Adams
- Released: May 3, 2011
- Length: 40:07
- Label: N-House
- Producer: Yolanda Adams; Steve Bracey; Crazy C; Drathoven; Errol "Poppi" McCalla; Lab Ox; Vikaden

Yolanda Adams chronology
What a Wonderful Time (2007)	Becoming (2011)	Sunny Days (2024)

Singles from Becoming
- 1. "Be Still" Released: 2011; 2. "Rejoice" Released: 2011; 3. "Gotta Tell Ya" Released: 2012

Becoming is the eleventh studio album by American singer Yolanda Adams. Her first album in four years, it was released on May 3, 2011 on N-House Music Group as a Wal-Mart exclusive. Its release was preceded by the lead single "Be Still" which reached number 4 on the Billboard Gospel Songs. A critical success, Becoming, received Stellar Awards, NAACP Image Awards, and GMA Dove Awards nominations. It won Adams her fourth Best Gospel Artist.

== Critical reception ==
James Christopher Monger of AllMusic wrote that the album "puts the emphasis on the contemporary in CCM with an 11-track collection of inspirational, self-penned dancefloor jams (and one lovely ballad in the first single, "Be Still"). Simple, upbeat, and radio-ready, Becoming is a relentlessly positive and catchy set from one of the genre's most reliable talents."

Professional ratings
Review scores
Source	Rating
AllMusic	3.5/5 stars

== Track listing ==
No.	Title	Length
1.	"Golden"	4:01
2.	"Rejoice"	3:58
3.	"Be Still"	3:46
4.	"Just When"	3:16
5.	"Not Giving Up"	4:40
6.	"Living Proof"	3:33
7.	"Time"	3:24
8.	"You Can (Taylor's Song)"	4:06
9.	"What Would You Do"	3:00
10.	"Overwhelmed"	3:24
11.	"Gotta Tell Ya"	2:45

== Charts ==
=== Weekly charts ===
Chart (2011)	Peak position
US Billboard 200	99
US Independent Albums (Billboard)	18
US Top R&B/Hip-Hop Albums (Billboard)	22
US Top Gospel Albums (Billboard)	3

=== Year-end charts ===
Chart (2011)	Position
US Top Gospel Albums (Billboard)	22

== Release history ==
Region	Date	Formats	Label	Ref.
Various	May 3, 2011	CD; digital download	N-House	
