= Save the World (Yolanda Adams album) =

Studio album by Yolanda Adams
- Released: October 19, 1993
- Genre: Gospel
- Length: 45:22
- Label: Tribute; Benson
- Producer: Ben Tankard

Yolanda Adams chronology
Through the Storm (1991)	Save the World (1993)	More Than a Melody (1995)

Singles from Save the World
- 1. "The Battle Is the Lord's" Released: 1993; 2. "Let Us Worship Him" Released: 1993; 3. "This Joy" Released: 1993; 4. "Right Now" Released: 1994

Professional ratings
Review scores
Source	Rating
Cross Rhythms	6/10 squares
The Encyclopedia of Popular Music	4/5 stars

Save the World is the third studio album by American gospel singer Yolanda Adams. It was released by Tribute and Benson Records on October 19, 1993, in the United States.

== Track listing ==
1. "This Joy" (Pharis Evans) – 4:28
2. "The Battle Is the Lord's" (V. Michael McKay) – 4:23
3. "Real Love" (John Croslan II) – 4:40
4. "Ye of Little Faith" (Armirris Palmore) – 5:11
5. "Let Us Worship Him" (A. Palmore) – 3:35
6. "Save the World" (Raymond Reeder) – 4:35
7. "Right Now" (Adams, Michael Coston, Ted Howard) – 4:20
8. "I'll Always Remember" (A. Palmore) – 5:18
9. "Give It to Him" (Adams, Coston, Howard) – 4:57
10. "Before I Tell Them" (V. McKay) – 3:30

== Charts ==
Chart (1993)	Peak position
US Top Gospel Albums (Billboard)	6
