= Christmas with Yolanda Adams =

Studio album by Yolanda Adams
- Released: October 13, 2000
- Genre: Gospel
- Length: 41:47
- Label: Elektra

Yolanda Adams chronology
Mountain High... Valley Low (1999)	Christmas with Yolanda Adams (2000)	The Experience (2001)

Singles from Christmas with Yolanda Adams
- 1. "Have Yourself a Merry Little Christmas" Released: 2000

Professional ratings
Review scores
Source	Rating
Allmusic	3/5 stars
Cross Rhythms	6/10 squares
The Encyclopedia of Popular Music	2/5 stars
MTV Asia	7/10

Christmas with Yolanda Adams is the seventh studio album by American singer Yolanda Adams. Her first Christmas album, it was released by Elektra Records on October 13, 2000, in the United States.

== Track listing ==
No.	Title	Writer(s)	Length
1.	"Have Yourself a Merry Little Christmas"	Ralph Blane, Hugh Martin	3:35
2.	"Little Drummer Boy"	Katherine Davis, Henry Onorati, Harry Simeone	3:04
3.	"Born This Day"	Louis "Buster" Brown III, S. Dancy, Scott "Shavoni" Parker	4:08
4.	"The Christmas Song"	Mel Tormé, Robert Wells	3:40
5.	"It Came Upon a Midnight Clear"	Edmund Sears, Richard Storrs Willis	4:07
6.	"Carol of the Bells"/"What Child Is This?"		4:38
7.	"Silent Night"	Franz Xaver Gruber, Joseph Mohr	3:20
8.	"The First Noel"		3:04
9.	"O Holy Night"	Adolphe Adam / Brown III, Parker	4:59
10.	"Joy Medley" ("Joy to the World"/"Angels We Have Heard on High"/"Hark the Herald Angels Sing"/"The Hymn of Joy")		4:42

== Charts ==
=== Weekly charts ===
Chart (2000)	Peak position
US Billboard 200	86
US Top Holiday Albums (Billboard)	4
US Top Christian Albums (Billboard)	2
US Top Gospel Albums (Billboard)	1
US Top R&B/Hip-Hop Albums (Billboard)	31

=== Year-end charts ===
Chart (2001)	Position
US Top Gospel Albums (Billboard)	5
US Christian Albums (Billboard)	21
