= Day by Day (Yolanda Adams album) =

Day By Day

Studio album by Yolanda Adams
- Released: August 30, 2005
- Length: 54:14
- Label: Atlantic
- Producer: The Avila Brothers; Gordon Chambers; Mike City; Shep Crawford; Barry Eastmond; Kirk Franklin; Phil Galdston; Jimmy Jam & Terry Lewis; Rickey Minor; Troy Taylor; Gregory Curtis

Yolanda Adams chronology
Believe (2001)	Day By Day (2005)	What a Wonderful Time (2007)

Singles from Day By Day
- 1. "Be Blessed" Released: 2005; 2. "Victory" Released: 2005; 3. "Someone Watching Over You" Released: 2005; 4. "This Too Shall Pass " Released: 2005

Professional ratings
Review scores
Source	Rating
AllMusic	4.5/5 stars
Cross Rhythms	8/10 squares
The Encyclopedia of Popular Music	3/5 stars

Day By Day is the ninth studio album by American singer Yolanda Adams. It was released by Atlantic Records on August 30, 2005 in the United States. The album was nominated for a Dove Award for Urban of the Year at the 37th GMA Dove Awards. It also earned two Grammy Award nominations for Best Gospel Performance and Best Gospel Song, with "Be Blessed" winning the former category at the 48th Annual Grammy Awards.

== Commercial reception ==
Day by Day is Adams' highest-charting album, debuting at number 23 on the US Billboard 200 and number 4 on the Top R&B/Hip-Hop Albums, with first week sales of 29,316; besting her previous peaks of number 24 on the Billboard 200 and number 5 on the Top R&B/Hip-Hop Albums chart with Mountain High...Valley Low (1999). Furthermore, Day by Day is her fourth consecutive number-one album on the US Top Gospel Albums chart, where it spent 3 weeks at number-one. In its second week, the album sold 23,820 units, a 19% dip from its first week. It went on to spend a total of 22 weeks on the Billboard 200 and 56 weeks on the Top R&B/Hip-Hop Albums chart, where it ranked at number 86 on the 2006 year-end chart. On Top Gospel Albums, the album accumulated a total of 100 weeks and ranked at number 5 on the 2006 year-end chart.

== Track listing ==
No.	Title	Writer(s)	Producer(s)	Length
1.	"Victory"	Gregory Curtis	Curtis	4:43
2.	"Tonight" (featuring Kirk Franklin)	Kirk Franklin	Franklin	4:58
3.	"Someone Watching Over You"	Barry Eastmond; Gordon Chambers; Phil Galdston	Eastmond; Chambers; Galdston	4:53
4.	"Alwaysness"	The Avila Brothers; Jimmy Jam & Terry Lewis; Adams	Jam and Lewis; The Avila Brothers Brothers	5:07
5.	"Day By Day"	Curtis	Curtis	3:56
6.	"Lift Him Up" (featuring Donnie McClurkin & Mary Mary)	Harris III; Big Jim Wright; Lewis; Adams	Jam and Lewis; Wright	4:59
7.	"It's Gon Be Nice"	Shep Crawford; Adams	Crawford	2:59
8.	"Be Blessed"	Harris III; Wright; Lewis; Adams	Jam and Lewis; Wright	5:47
9.	"Better Than Gold"	Chambers; Galdston; Troy Taylor	Chambers; Galdston; Taylor	3:38
10.	"Show Me"	Franklin	Franklin	4:12
11.	"I'm Grateful"	Mike City	Flowers	3:38
12.	"This Too Shall Pass"	Connie Ray Harrington; Ty Kelly Lacy	Rickey Minor	5:00

== Charts ==
=== Weekly charts ===
Chart (2005)	Peak position
US Billboard 200	23
US Top Gospel Albums (Billboard)	1
US Top R&B/Hip-Hop Albums (Billboard)	4

=== Year-end charts ===
Chart (2005)	Position
US Top Gospel Albums (Billboard)	7
Chart (2006)	Position
US Top Gospel Albums (Billboard)	5
US Top R&B/Hip-Hop Albums (Billboard)	86
Chart (2007)	Position
US Top Gospel Albums (Billboard)	33
