= Be Blessed =

2005 single by Yolanda Adams

Single by Yolanda Adams

from the album Day By Day
- Released: 2005
- Length: 5:47
- Label: Atlantic
- Songwriters: Jimmy Jam and Terry Lewis; James "Big Jim" Wright; Yolanda Adams

Yolanda Adams singles chronology
"Someone Watching Over You" (2005)	"Be Blessed" (2005)	"Victory" (2005)

"Be Blessed" is a song by American singer Yolanda Adams, a single from her 2005 album Day By Day. The song topped the Gospel Billboard chart making it one of the most successful Gospel songs of 2005.

== Awards ==
At the 2006 Grammy Awards, Adams won Best Gospel Song for this song. That same year, it was also nominated for a Dove Award for Contemporary Gospel Recorded Song of the Year at the 37th GMA Dove Awards.
