= Pages of Life - Chapters I & II =

Pages Of Life - Chapters I & II

Studio album by Fred Hammond
- Released: April 28, 1998
- Recorded: 1997–1998
- Genre: CCM, contemporary gospel
- Length: 143:13
- Label: Verity Records
- Producer: Fred Hammond, Paul Wright III

Fred Hammond chronology
The Spirit of David (1996)	Pages Of Life - Chapters I & II (1998)	Purposed by Design (2000)

Pages of Life - Chapters I & II is the fifth album from contemporary gospel singer Fred Hammond. The album was released on April 28, 1998 through Verity Records and Zomba Recording Corporation. The album is a collaboration with vocalists and musicians of Radical For Christ.

The album consists of two discs:.

- Chapter I contains 16 original tracks, including the smash hit 'Let The Praise Begin'.
- Chapter II is a live album, and contains tracks from Chapter I, and additional original material. It was recorded live at The Straight Gate Church in Detroit on Saturday, November 29, 1997 at 6pm.

== Track listing ==
[Chapter I - Studio]

1. "Let The Praise Begin" (Fred Hammond) - 5:21
2. "He's A Rock (Interlude)" (Fred Hammond) - 0:42
3. "I Wanna Know Your Ways" (Fred Hammond) - 4:35
4. "I Will Bless His Holy Name" (Fred Hammond, Kim Rutherford) - 4:46
5. "Jesus Is All" (Fred Hammond) - 5:13
6. "Your Steps Are Ordered" (Fred Hammond, Kim Rutherford) - 6:20
7. "Please Don't Pass Me By" (Fred Hammond, Tommie Walker, Kim Rutherford) - 5:05
8. "You Were Much Closer" (Fred Hammond, Noel Hall) - 4:50
9. "Just To Be Close To You" (Fred Hammond, Noel Hall) - 2:42
10. "He's God" (Fred Hammond, Noel Hall, Kim Rutherford) - 4:56
11. "All Things Are Working" (Fred Hammond, Tommie Walker, Kim Rutherford) - 5:38
12. "No Way, No Way (You Won't Lose)" (Fred Hammond, Kim Rutherford) - 4:02
13. "Your Love" (Fred Hammond, Kim Rutherford, Jason D. Jordan) - 4:56
14. "I Wanna Be Yours" (Fred Hammond, David Ivey, Noel Hall) - 4:45
15. "You Called Me Friend" (Fred Hammond, Maurice David Crutcher, Kim Rutherford) - 4:04
16. "You Are My Song" (Fred Hammond, Maurice David Crutcher) - 4:00

[Chapter II - Live]

1. "Intro" (Fred Hammond) - 1:27
2. "Let The Praise Begin" (Fred Hammond) - 7:06
3. "When The Spirit Of The Lord" (James McCurdy, Fred Hammond) - 4:42
4. "Glory To Glory To Glory" (Fred Hammond) - 7:02
5. "I Wanna Know Your Ways (Intro)" (Fred Hammond) - 2:35
6. "I Wanna Know Your Ways" (Fred Hammond) - 6:20
7. "Jesus Is All (Intro)" (Writer Unknown) - 6:00
8. "Jesus Is All" (Fred Hammond) - 6:45
9. "Your Steps Are Ordered" (Fred Hammond, Kim Rutherford) - 7:45
10. "No Weapon" (Fred Hammond, Alvin Moore) - 6:10
11. "Dwell" (Fred Hammond, Kim Rutherford) - 5:41
12. "We're Blessed/Shout Unto God" (Fred Hammond, Tommie Walker/Fred Hammond, Tommie Walker, David Ivey) - 5:30
13. "We're Blessed/Shout Unto God (Finale)" (Fred Hammond) - 4:43

== Personnel ==
Producer:

- Fred Hammond for Face to Face Productions - (Chapter I & Chapter II)

Co-Producer:

- Paul Wright III for MPW Entertainment Corp. - (Chapter II)

Executive Producers:

- Fred Hammond - (Chapter I & Chapter II)
- Paul Wright III - (Chapter II)

Lead vocals and arrangement:

- Fred Hammond

Background vocals:

- Radical for Christ

== Charts and certifications ==
The album reached number one on the Billboard Top Gospel Albums chart, remaining atop the chart for more than 15 weeks. It peaked at number 51 on the Billboard 200 albums chart. The album has reached Platinum status.
