= Mountain High... Valley Low =

Mountain High...Valley Low

Studio album by Yolanda Adams
- Released: September 3, 1999
- Genres: Gospel, R&B
- Length: 52:30
- Label: Elektra
- Producers: Kevin Bond; Buster & Shavoni; Warryn Campbell; Fred Hammond; Jimmy Jam & Terry Lewis; Walter Millsap III; Richard Smallwood; Keith Thomas

Yolanda Adams chronology
Songs from the Heart (1998)	Mountain High...Valley Low (1999)	Christmas With Yolanda Adams (2000)

Singles from Mountain High...Valley Low
- 1. "Yeah" Released: 1999; 2. "Open My Heart" Released: 2000; 3. "Fragile Heart" Released: 2000; 4. "Things We Do" Released: 2000

Professional ratings
Review scores
Source	Rating
AllMusic	4.5/5 stars
Cross Rhythms	8/10 squares
The Encyclopedia of Popular Music	4/5 stars

Mountain High...Valley Low is the sixth studio album by American singer Yolanda Adams. It was released by Elektra Records on September 3, 1999, in the United States. The album stands as Adams's best-selling to date, having sold 1,374,000, as of 2009, and is certified platinum by the Recording Industry Association of America (RIAA). The album won the Grammy Award for Best Contemporary Soul Gospel Album and remains one of the best-selling gospel albums of all time.

Several singles were released from Mountain High... Valley Low. The set leads with the Warryn Campbell-produced "Yeah", which was co-written by gospel duo Mary Mary who springboarded from the song to gain their own fame. The most notable single was the second release, "Open My Heart," which became a massive crossover fixture on R&B radio. Both of the singles had accompanying music videos. Remixers like Maurice Joshua, Digital Black-N-Groove, Pound Boys, and Junior Vasquez were brought in to turn both of these songs into dance club-friendly material. "The Things We Do" and "Fragile Heart" were also serviced to radio and fared well on adult contemporary stations.

== Track listing ==
Credits taken from the album's liner notes.

No.	Title	Writer(s)	Producer(s)	Length
1.	"Time to Change"	Erica Atkins; Tina Atkins; Warryn Campbell	Campbell	4:00
2.	"Yeah"	E. Atkins; T. Atkins; Campbell	Campbell	3:17
3.	"Fragile Heart"	Yolanda Adams; Louis Brown; Scott Parker	Buster & Shavoni	4:38
4.	"That Name"	Richard Smallwood	Smallwood	4:46
5.	"In the Midst of It All"	Kevin Bond	Bond	6:57
6.	"The Things We Do"	Keith Thomas; Robin Scoffield	Thomas	5:33
7.	"Open My Heart"	Yolanda Adams; Terry Lewis; James Harris III; James Wright	Jimmy Jam & Terry Lewis; Wright^{[A]}	5:40
8.	"Wherever You Are"	Adams; Lewis; Harris; Wright	Jam & Lewis; Wright^{[A]}	4:20
9.	"He'll Arrive (Coming Back)"	Magdalene Millsap; Walter "Little Walt" Millsap III; Candice Nelson	Little Walt	4:16
10.	"Continual Praise"	Adams; Tommie Walker; Fred Hammond	Hammond	4:28
11.	"Already Alright"	Adams; Lewis; Harris; Wright	Jam & Lewis; Wright^{[A]}	4:35
Total length:				52:30

Notes

- ^{^[A]} denotes co-producer

== Personnel ==
"Time to Change"

- Produced by Warryn Campbell
- Vocals: Yolanda Adams
- Backing vocals: Mary Mary
- Instrumental music performed by Warryn Campbell

"Yeah"

- Produced by Warryn Campbell
- Vocals: Yolanda Adams
- Backing vocals: Mary Mary
- Guitar: Dave Foreman
- Instrumental music performed by Warryn Campbell

"Fragile Heart"

- Produced by Buster & Shavoni: Louis Brown & Scott "Shavoni" Parker
- Lead Vocals: Yolanda Adams
- Background Vocals: Vanessa Williams, Raymond Reeder & Victoria Purcell
- Piano Solo & All Pianos: Tim Carmon
- Additional String Overdubs: Rickey Grundy
- Instrumental music performed by Buster & Shavoni

"That Name"

- Produced by Richard Smallwood
- Lead Vocals: Yolanda Adams
- Background Vocals: Richard Smallwood & Vision
- Instrumental music performed by Richard Smallwood, Bryant Pugh, Darin Atwater, Mark A. Walker & Roger Ryan

"In The Midst of It All"

- Produced by Kevin Bond
- Live Drums: Jeremy Haynes
- Instrumental music performed by Kevin Bond
- Originally performed by Walter Hawkins & The Hawkins Family

"The Things We Do"

- Produced by Keith Thomas
- Music & Strings arranged by Keith Thomas
- Strings arranged & conducted by Ronn Huff
- Strings performed by Nashville String Machine
- Acoustic Guitar: Bruce Gaitsch
- Keyboards, Bass & Drum Machine played by Keith Thomas
- Additional Drum Machine: Mark Hammond
- Additional Background Vocals: Debbie Winans
- Vocal Samples: "Inaugural Address" by John F. Kennedy & "I Have a Dream (Detroit)" by Martin Luther King Jr.

"Open My Heart"

- Produced by Jimmy Jam and Terry Lewis & James "Big Jim" Wright
- Percussion & Live Drums: Stokley Williams
- Guitar: Mike Scott
- Strings arranged by Lee Blaske & Big Jim Wright
- Violins: Brenda Mickens, Carolyn Daws, Elizabeth Sobieski, Michael Sobieski, Elsa Nilsson, Leslie Shank & Thomas Kornacker
- Violas: Alice Preves & Tamas Strasser
- All Other Instruments played by Big Jim Wright
- Background Vocals: Marva King & Yolanda Adams

"Wherever You Are"

- Produced by Jimmy Jam and Terry Lewis & James "Big Jim" Wright
- Background Vocals: Big Jim Wright & Yolanda Adams
- Keyboards: Big Jim Wright & Jimmy Jam
- Bass played by Jimmy Jam
- Percussion: Terry Lewis
- Guitar: Mike Scott
- All Other Instruments played by Big Jim Wright
- Re-Sung Lyrics from "I Wanna Be Where You Are" by Michael Jackson

"He'll Arrive (Coming Back)"

- Produced by Walter "Little Walt" Millsap III
- Lead & Background Vocals: Kelly Price & Yolanda Adams
- Background Vocals: Candice Nelson
- All Music performed by Walter "Lil Walt" Millsap III

"Continual Praise"

- Produced by Fred Hammond
- Keyboards & Drum Machine: Tommie Walker
- Lead Guitar & Live Bass played by Fred Hammond
- Vocals arranged by Fred Hammond
- Background Vocals performed by JoAnn Rosario, Bryan Pratt, David Ivey, Frederick J. Purifoy II, Kevin L. Wilson, Marsha Johns, Miatura Dias, Pam Kenyon M. Donald, Tamika Lucas & Yoshawndala Parker.

"Already Alright"

- Produced by Jimmy Jam and Terry Lewis & James "Big Jim" Wright
- Background Vocals: Big Jim Wright, Marva King & Yolanda Adams
- Drum Machine: Alex Richbourg
- Keyboards: Big Jim Wright
- All Other Instruments played by Jimmy Jam and Terry Lewis

== Charts ==
=== Weekly charts ===
Chart (1999)	Peak position
US Billboard 200	24
US Top R&B/Hip-Hop Albums (Billboard)	5
US Top Gospel Albums (Billboard)	1
US Top Christian Albums (Billboard)	1

=== Year-end charts ===
Chart (1999)	Peak position
US Top Gospel Albums (Billboard)	17
Chart (2000)	Position
US Billboard 200	120
US Top R&B/Hip-Hop Albums (Billboard)	20
US Top Gospel Albums (Billboard)	1
US Christian Albums (Billboard)	1
Chart (2001)	Position
US Top Gospel Albums (Billboard)	2
US Christian Albums (Billboard)	5

=== Decade-end charts ===
Chart (2000–2009)	Peak position
US Top Gospel Albums (Billboard)	1
US Christian Albums (Billboard)	8

== Certifications ==
Region	Certification	Certified units/sales
United States (RIAA)	Platinum	1,374,000
