= Big Jim Wright =

American singer-songwriter

James "Big Jim" Wright
- Also known as: Big Jim; Jimmy Wright
- Born: James Quentin Wright; March 19, 1966; Rockford, Illinois, U.S.
- Died: September 29, 2018 (aged 52)
- Occupations: Musician; songwriter; record producer
- Formerly of: Sounds of Blackness

James Quentin "Big Jim" Wright (March 19, 1966 – September 29, 2018) was an American musician, composer, songwriter, film score and record producer. A member of the vocal and instrumental ensemble Sounds of Blackness, Wright became a frequent collaborator of production duo Jimmy Jam and Terry Lewis and an in-house producer for their company, Flyte Tyme Productions, in the 1990s.

== Biography ==
Wright was born in Rockford, Illinois. The son of Jenniel Wright and Alan Jackson, he lived most of his life in Rockford, also living in Roscoe as well as Rancho Cucamonga, California, and Atlanta, Georgia. In 1984, he graduated from Rockford West High School before relocating to Eden Prairie, Minnesota.

In Minnesota, Wright joined the vocal and instrumental ensemble Sounds of Blackness, serving as the band's producer, arranger and composer. Through band member Ann Nesby he became connected to songwriter-producer Terry Lewis who offered Wright an exclusive publishing contract with their company, Flyte Tyme Production, while he was still providing lead vocals and keyboards for Sounds of Blackness.

In 1999, he wrote and produced Yolanda Adams's NAACP Image Award-winning song "Open My Heart." In 2004, Wright won the Black Reel Award for Best Original or Adapted Song for his contribution on "He Still Loves Me" for the soundtrack of the musical comedy film The Fighting Temptations (2003). In 2006, he won the Grammy Award for Best Gospel Song for co-writing Adams' song "Be Blessed" from her album Day by Day (2006).

== Death ==
On September 29, 2018, Wright was found dead in his Rockford home. He was cremated at Carl E. Ponds Funeral Home. His family had a private visitation for him at Saint Luke Missionary Baptist Church on October 12, 2018. They hosted a public memorial service for him on the next day at Coronado Theater followed by his urn interment at Sunset Memorial Gardens.

== Discography ==
=== Singles ===
- "Til I Found You" (Jam & Lewis & Sounds of Blackness featuring Ann Nesby, Big Jim Wright & Lauren Evans) (2019)

== Selected credits ==
Title	Artist(s)	Originating album	Year	Notes
"Free"	Mýa	Fear of Flying	2000	Co-producer
"How Do I Say"	Usher	8701	2003	Co-producer
"Everybody's Somebody's Fool"	Aretha Franklin	So Damn Happy	2003	Producer
"Sorry Seems to Be the Hardest Word"	Mary J. Blige	Bridget Jones: The Edge of Reason	2004	Co-producer
"Secuction"	Usher	Confessions	2004	Writer, Co-producer
"That's What It's Made For"	Usher	Confessions	2004	Writer, Co-producer
"Alwaysness"	Yolanda Adams	Day by Day	2006	Writer, producer
"Be Blessed"	Yolanda Adams	Day by Day	2006	Writer, producer
"Lift Him Up"	Yolanda Adams	Day by Day	2006	Writer, producer
"Can't Get Enough"	Mary J. Blige	The Breakthrough	2006	Co-producer
"Circles"	Mariah Carey	The Emancipation of Mimi	2006	Co-Writer, Co-producer
"Fly Like a Bird"	Mariah Carey	The Emancipation of Mimi	2006	Co-Writer, Co-producer
"I Wish You Knew"	Mariah Carey	The Emancipation of Mimi	2006	Co-Writer, Co-producer
"What's Not Being Said"	Heather Headley	In My Mind	2006	Writer, Co-producer
"Home"	Carl Thomas	So Much Better	2007	Writer, Co-producer
"Angel"	Chaka Khan	Funk This	2007	Writer, producer
"Back in the Day"	Chaka Khan	Funk This	2007	Writer, producer
"Hail to the Wrong"	Chaka Khan	Funk This	2007	Writer, producer
"Ladies' Man"	Chaka Khan	Funk This	2007	Producer
"One for All Time"	Chaka Khan	Funk This	2007	Writer, producer
"All Hearts Aren't Shaped the Same"	Deborah Cox	The Promise	2008	Writer, producer
"All Over Me"	Deborah Cox	The Promise	2008	Writer, producer
"Beautiful U R"	Deborah Cox	The Promise	2008	Writer, producer
"Did You Ever Love Me"	Deborah Cox	The Promise	2008	Writer, producer
"Down 4 U"	Deborah Cox	The Promise	2008	Writer, producer
"Love Is Not Made in Words"	Deborah Cox	The Promise	2008	Writer, producer
"The Point of It All"	Anthony Hamilton	The Point of It All	2008	Writer, Co-producer
"Betcha Gon' Know"	Mariah Carey	Memoirs of an Imperfect Angel	2009	Co-Writer, Co-producer
"Higher Than This"	Ledisi	Turn Me Loose	2009	Writer, Co-producer
"My Love"	Johnny Gill	Still Winning	2011	Producer
"All I Want for Christmas Is You (SuperFestive!)"	Justin Bieber, Mariah Carey	Under the Mistletoe	2011	Co-Producer
"America the Beautiful"	Mariah Carey	Me. I Am Mariah... The Elusive Chanteuse	2014	Co-Producer
"Camouflage"	Mariah Carey	Me. I Am Mariah... The Elusive Chanteuse	2014	Co-Writer, producer
"Cry"	Mariah Carey	Me. I Am Mariah... The Elusive Chanteuse	2014	Co-Writer, Co-producer
"It's a Wrap"	Mariah Carey	Me. I Am Mariah... The Elusive Chanteuse	2014	Co-Producer
