= Live from Another Level =

Live From Another Level

Live album by Israel & New Breed
- Released: May 4, 2004
- Recorded: November 2003
- Genre: Christian
- Length: 1:53:43
- Label: Integrity Media

Israel & New Breed chronology
Real	Live From Another Level	Alive In South Africa

Live From Another Level is a live worship album by Israel & New Breed. It was recorded in November 2003 at the Total Grace Christian Center in Decatur, Georgia while the DVD to the album was recorded at Sheffield Family Life Worship Center in Kansas City, Missouri. It is Houghton's fourth album, his third on Integrity Media, and his second live recording serving as the follow-up to his 2001 album “New Season.” The album received good reviews from critics.

== Track listing ==
=== Level 1 (Disc 1) - Higher ===
1. Come In From The Outside - 5:38
2. Again I Say Rejoice - 4:59
3. Again I Say Rejoice (Reprise) - 2:04
4. We Win - 4:54
5. All Around - 5:38
6. You've Made Me Glad/Who Is Like The Lord? - 6:51
7. I Hear The Sound - 7:39
8. Spoken Word by Bishop Garlington - 2:31
9. Medley: So Easy To Love You/Friend Of God - 3:43

=== Level 2 (Disc 2) - Deeper ===
1. Friend of God - 6:34
2. Spontaneous Worship - 3:10
3. Friend - 6:25
4. Friend Medley: Joy Of My Desire/No Not One/What A Friend We Have In Jesus - 7:12
5. Rise Within Us - 5:18
6. Another Breakthrough - 7:14
7. Lord Of The Breakthrough - 7:36
8. Breathe Into Me - 5:12
9. Awesome Medley - 2:56
10. Medley: Here I Am To Worship/You Are Good - 7:30
11. Holy - 4:23
12. Going To Another Level - 6:12
