= What a Wonderful Time =

Studio album by Yolanda Adams
- Released: October 17, 2007
- Length: 41:03
- Label: Columbia
- Producer: Warryn Campbell; Gordon Chambers; Michael J. Powell

Yolanda Adams chronology
Day By Day (2005)	What a Wonderful Time (2007)	Becoming (2011)

Singles from What a Wonderful Time
- 1. "Hold On" Released: 2007

Professional ratings
Review scores
Source	Rating
Allmusic	3.5/5 stars

What a Wonderful Time is the tenth studio album by American singer Yolanda Adams. Her second Christmas album and only record to be released by Columbia Records, it was issued on October 17, 2007. What a Wonderful Time consists of ten tracks, featuring five original songs and five cover versions of Christmas standards and carols.

== Track listing ==
No.	Title	Writer(s)	Length
1.	"My Favorite Things"	Richard Rodgers; Oscar Hammerstein II	4:32
2.	"Give Love on Christmas Day"	Berry Gordy; Alphonzo Mizell; Christine Perren; Freddie Perren; Deke Richards	3:48
3.	"What a Wonderful Time"	Yolanda Adams; Maxx Frank	2:37
4.	"Jingle Bells"	James Pierpont	3:02
5.	"Do You Hear What I Hear"	Noël Regney; Gloria Shayne	5:24
6.	"A Season of Love"	Yolanda Adams; Gordon Chambers; Darren Lighty; Keir Gist	4:09
7.	"Hold On"	Yolanda Adams; Stan Jones; Doug Williams; Kevin Evans	4:44
8.	"Just Because"	Maxx Frank; Eric Dawkins	3:52
9.	"Little Drummer Boy"	Harry Simeone; Katherine Kennicott Davis; Henry Onorati	3:17
10.	"With God"	Gregory G. Curtis; Yolanda Adams	5:38
Total length:			41:03

== Charts ==
=== Weekly charts ===
Chart (2007)	Peak position
US Billboard 200	179
US Top Holiday Albums (Billboard)	16
US Top Gospel Albums (Billboard)	2
US Top R&B/Hip-Hop Albums (Billboard)	28

=== Year-end charts ===
Chart (2008)	Position
US Top Gospel Albums (Billboard)	43

== Release history ==
Region	Date	Formats	Label	Ref.
Various	October 17, 2007	CD; digital download	Columbia	
