= Open My Heart =

Single by Yolanda Adams

from the album Mountain High... Valley Low
- Released: 2000
- Recorded: 1998
- Genre: Gospel; R&B
- Length: 5:40
- Label: Elektra
- Songwriters: James Harris; James Q. Wright; Terry Lewis; Yolanda Adams
- Producers: Jimmy Jam & Terry Lewis; James "Big Jim" Wright

Yolanda Adams singles chronology
"Still I Rise" (1998)	"Open My Heart" (2000)	"Yeah" (1999)

"Open My Heart" is a song by Yolanda Adams released in 2000. The song gained Adams great popularity in the secular audiences. Being the most groundbreaking single of her career, she won several awards for this song. "Open My Heart" helped her 1999 album Mountain High...Valley Low gain multi-platinum status and reach charts heights not often attained by artists of the gospel genre.

The song peaked at #10 on the Hot R&B/Hip-Hop Songs chart, and #57 on the Billboard Hot 100 chart. Remixes by Steve "Silk" Hurley and Junior Vasquez helped the song peak at #29 on the Hot Dance Club Play Chart.

The song was sampled by Nick Cannon on his single "Can I Live."

== Song credits ==
- Produced by Jimmy Jam and Terry Lewis & James "Big Jim" Wright
- Percussion & Live Drums: Stokley Williams
- Guitar: Mike Scott
- Strings arranged by Lee Blaske & Big Jim Wright
- Violins: Brenda Mickens, Carolyn Daws, Elizabeth Sobieski, Michael Sobieski, Elsa Nilsson, Leslie Shank & Thomas Kornacker
- Violas: Alice Preves & Tamas Strasser
- All Other Instruments played by Big Jim Wright
- Background Vocals: Marva King & Yolanda Adams

== Track listings ==
US Promo CD Release (PRCD 1484-2)

1. Open Your Heart (Radio Edit) – 5:37
2. Open Your Heart (Album Version) – 5:38
3. Open Your Heart (Audio Bio – Song) – 1:05
4. Open Your Heart (Call-Out Hook) – 0:13

US Promo Remix CD Release (PRCD 1556-2)

1. Open My Heart (Pound Boys Radio Edit)
2. Open My Heart (Pound Boys Vocal)
3. Open My Heart (Pound Boys Dub)

US Limited Edition CD (PRCD 1557-2)

1. Open My Heart (Pound Boys Radio Edit)
2. Open My Heart (Radio Edit)

US Promo 12" Remixes (ED 6238)

1. Open My Heart (Silk's Spiritual Workout)
2. Open My Heart (Silk's Open My Filter Disco Dub Instrumental)
3. Open My Heart (Open My Filter Disco Dub)
4. Open My Heart (Silk's Spiritual Workout Instrumental)

US Double Vinyl Junior Vasquez Remixes (ED 6261)

1. Open My Heart (Junior's Sunday Morning Club Mix)
2. Open My Heart (Junior's Uplifting Mix)
3. Open My Heart (Junior's Sunday Morning Instrumental)
4. Open My Heart (Junior's Sunday Morning Beat)
5. Open My Heart (Junior's Acapella)

== Charts ==
=== Weekly charts ===
Chart (2000–01)	Peak position
US Billboard Hot 100	57
US Dance Club Songs (Billboard)	29
US Hot R&B/Hip-Hop Songs (Billboard)	10

=== Year-end charts ===
Chart (2000)	Position
US Hot R&B/Hip-Hop Songs (Billboard)	31
Chart (2001)	Position
US Hot R&B/Hip-Hop Songs (Billboard)	100

== Certifications ==
Region	Certification	Certified units/sales
United States (RIAA)	Gold	500,000^{‡}
^{‡} Sales+streaming figures based on certification alone.
