= Lulah McEwen Hedgeman =

American musician and educator (1938–1997)

- Lulah Hedgeman c. 1980 (photo: Richard Gardner)
- Occupation: Music teacher
- Known for: Vocal music
- Awards: Outstanding Performing Arts Teachers in America

Academic background
- Education: Fisk University, University of Memphis

Academic work
- Notable students: Wendy Moten, K.Michelle, O'Landa Draper

Lulah McEwen Hedgeman (1938–1997) was an American musician and educator in Tennessee who taught at Memphis' Overton High School for Creative and Performing Arts. Hedgeman built a concert choir, a chamber group, and a jazz show choir and took her singers to the level of international competition. Her background included a B.A. in Music at Fisk University and a Master's degree from the University of Memphis.

She won multiple "teacher of the year" awards at the local and state level, but gained national recognition in 1991 after being chosen as one of Disney's "Outstanding Performing Arts Teachers in America". For this she received a cash award and a paid trip to Hollywood for her 31-member chamber singers, whom she conducted in a Disney Channel program called "American Teacher Awards". In 1994 she was given an "Honorary Doctor of Fine Arts" degree by Rhodes College. She was subsequently called "Dr. Hedgeman" even though the title was an honorary one.

She taught future music professionals Wendy Moten, K.Michelle, O'Landa Draper, and bass-baritone Charles Billings. In 2021, when Moten appeared as a contestant on NBC's "The Voice " she acknowledged Hedgeman and dedicated the performance to her. Hedgeman died suddenly on December 8, 1997, after an apparent heart attack at age 59. It occurred in her home about two hours after she conducted a choir rehearsal. The City of Memphis named a street for her, "Dr. Lulah M. Hedgeman Lane".
