= Tribute Records =

Tribute Records (Ben-Jamin' Universal Music) is an American gospel music record label established in 1990. The label was co-founded by jazz musician and former pro basketball player Ben Tankard and George King. King owned Nashville based Diadem Music Group which produced Contemporary Christian music. Diadem's signature artist Bob Carlisle is best known for his hit song "Butterfly Kisses". Tribute became the urban contemporary gospel (black gospel) division of Diadem and home to several gospel music stars, most notably Tankard (a keyboardist whose solo albums were instrumental releases), Yolanda Adams, Twinkie Clark of The Clark Sisters and others. Tankard was executive producer and music producer on most of the early Tribute releases and his vision was to develop artists and pioneer a new smooth genre of music he coined as "gospeljazz". He featured Yolanda Adam's jazzy vocals on the album and concept video single " You Bring Out The Best In Me " on his 1994 release "Play Me In Your Key". The jazzy collaborations of Tankard and Adams produced major crossover success and brought the name of Tribute Records to the forefront. Office Depot produced a gospel style " Taking Care Of Business " commercial national ad campaign that was centered on Tribute Records, Tankard, and Adams and ran from 1994 to 1996.

Though the Tribute Label (Ben-Jamin' Universal Music) imprint remained with Tankard, the label contracts were later absorbed by Benson Records and later by Zomba Music Group, the gospel conglomerate Verity Records circa 1996. With all the mergers and moves that had taken place with Diadem/Tribute artists and projects, Tankard put the vision for Tribute Records on hold in 1998 and was bought out of his Vice President of A & R / Producer position with Diadem/Benson when the companies were relocated to New York City by Zomba Music Group. Tankard accepted the buy-out and put all his emphasis (and money) on his own solo career. Under a long term artist contract with Verity Records he recorded eight addition instrumental studio albums over the next decade becoming the world's bestselling gospel/jazz artist. Tankard's Verity Records contract expired with the release of his 2009 album Mercy, Mercy, Mercy which won the 2010 Stellar Award."

Tankard's sixteenth studio album, Ben Tankard / Full Tank was released on June 5, 2012 on his revamped Tribute Records (Ben-Jamin' Universal Music & Film) label. It featured music from legendary producer-songwriters, Jimmy Jam and Terry Lewis, and special guest appearances by Mark Kibble / Take 6, & Gerald Albright. The lead single from this release, "Sunday Vibes", featuring Tim Bowman on guitar, was released on May 20 and quickly became the No. 1 most played song on Watercolors (Sirius XM). The CD debuted its first week on the Billboard and Amazon.com top sellers charts in three categories: Jazz, Gospel and Southern Gospel, a first for Tankard in that genre.

In September 2012, Ben Tankard / Full Tank was nominated by the Soul Train Music Awards for Best Contemporary Jazz Artist and the Stellar Awards for Best Urban Contemporary Performance. Tribute/Ben-Jamin' imprint label is also the home to several TV and Film projects Tankard has in development including, " Thicker Than Water: The Tankards ", a new reality show that showcases Tankard's family life, music career, business ventures, passion for aviation, and his role as a motivational speaker with the National Basketball Association (NBA). When asked how will the reality show will look, Ben responded: "It is a cross between Bill Cosby and Run's House, with a twist". Other music releases include: Gospel/Soul singer "Shelly", Urban Praise ensemble "Tribe of Benjamin", and SBM (Sunday's Best Musicians), which is a collection of some the top "under exposed" gospel musicians in America.

== Notable 1990s Tribute Releases ==
- Ben Tankard: Keynote Speaker (1990)
- Yolanda Adams: Through the Storm (1991)
- Ben Tankard: Keys to Life (1991)
- Ben Tankard: An Instrumental Christmas (1991)
- New Jersey Mass Choir: Hope of the World(1992)
- Ben Tankard: Sunday Drivin' (1993)
- Yolanda Adams: Save the World (1993)
- Alabama State Mass Choir Have Thine Own Way (1993)
- Ben Tankard: Play Me In Your Key (1994)
- Yolanda Adams: More Than a Melody (1995)
- Yolanda Adams: Live In Washington (1996)
- Twinkie Clark: The Masterpiece (1996)
- Ben Tankard: Instrumentally Yours (1996)
- Ben Tankard & Tribe of Benjamin: Git Yo Prayze On (1997)

Tribute Records (Ben-Jamin' Universal Music & Film) Releases

- TV Show: "Thicker Than Water: The Tankards" Season II 2014/2015
- Album: Ben Tankard Full Tank 2012 (Featuring Gerald Albright, Tim Bowman, Cynthia Jones, and Mark Kibble (Take 6).
- Album: Shelly Upside Down 2013
- Album: Ben Tankard Full Tank 2.O 2015
- Album : Tribe of Benjamin Tribute to Sounds of Blackness 2016
- Album : Sunday's Best Musicians (collection) 2016 (Online Contest with winners appearing on CD)
- Radio Show: Smooth Vibes w/ Ben
- Social Documentary: "Why Women Try to Change Men" TBA

== See also ==
- List of record labels
