= Yolanda Adams =

American gospel music singer (born 1961)

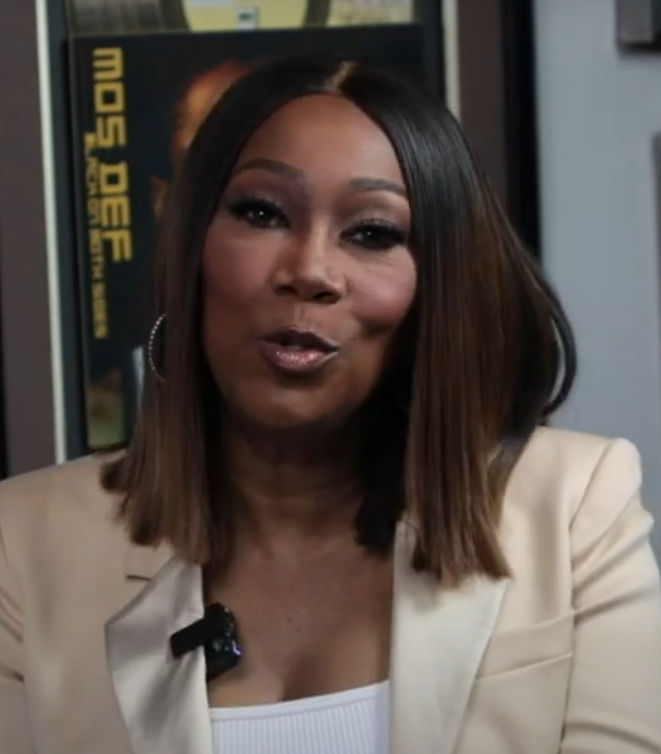
- Adams in 2024

Background information
- Also known as: Queen of Contemporary Gospel Music; First Lady of Modern Gospel
- Born: Yolanda Yvette Adams; August 27, 1961 (age 65); Houston, Texas, U.S.
- Genres: Gospel; R&B; soul
- Occupations: Singer; radio host; actress
- Years active: 1982–present
- Labels: Sound of Gospel; Tribute/Benson; Verity; Elektra; Atlantic; Columbia; N-House
- Website: yolandaadamslive.com

Yolanda Yvette Adams (born August 27, 1961) is an American gospel singer, actress, and host of her own nationally syndicated morning gospel show. She is one of the best-selling gospel artists of all time, having sold over 10 million albums worldwide. In addition to achieving multi-platinum status, she has won four Grammy Awards, four Dove Awards, five BET Awards, six NAACP Image Awards, six Soul Train Music Awards, two BMI Awards and 16 Stellar Awards. She is the first Gospel artist to win the Grammy Award for Best Gospel Song. She is also the first Gospel artist to be awarded an American Music Award.

She is known as the "Queen of Contemporary Gospel Music", the "First Lady of Modern Gospel", while Variety dubbed her the "Reigning Queen of Urban Gospel".

Adams was named by Billboard, in 2009, as the No. 1 gospel artist of the decade, driven by the sales of her No. 1 album Mountain High...Valley Low. In 2016, President Barack Obama awarded Adams with the Presidential Lifetime Achievement Award for her volunteer service. She was inducted into the Gospel Music Hall of Fame by the Gospel Music Association in 2017. In 2018, she became the first gospel artist nominated for a Tony Award for her work on SpongeBob SquarePants. In 2019, she received the Soul Train Music Awards Lady of Soul Award and received critical acclaim for officially opening Super Bowl LIV with her performance of "America the Beautiful". Billboard listed her as one of the Top Gospel Artist of the 2010s. She has scored five number one albums on Billboard's Top Gospel Album. Adams was inducted into the Black Music & Entertainment Walk of Fame in 2022.

== Early life ==
The eldest of six siblings, Adams was born in Houston, Texas. She graduated from Sterling High School in Houston in 1979. After graduating from Texas Southern University, she began a career as a schoolteacher and part-time model in Houston. Eventually, she gave up teaching to perform full-time as a lead singer.

== Musical career ==
=== Beginnings ===
Adams first attracted the attention of Thomas Whitfield and Sound of Gospel Records as a lead singer with Houston's Southeast Inspirational Choir affiliated with the Church of God in Christ, under the direction of Carl Preacher, Brenda Waters, and Shirley Joiner. The choir released the single "For My Liberty" in 1982 with her as the featured vocalist. In 1986, Adams was featured on the Edwin Hawkins Music and Arts Seminar Choir released Give Us Peace, with a performance entitled "My Trust Lies in You". Later, she signed a recording contract with Sound of Gospel which yielded her first album Just as I Am in 1987. In 1990, she was discovered by producer/keyboardist Ben Tankard, and signed to his independent label Tribute Records and released Through The Storm. Tankard's goal with Tribute Records during this time was to develop an audience for a smoother gospel/jazz sound. He featured Adams' vocals on his album and concept video single "You Bring Out The Best in Me" on his 1994 release Play Me in Your Key. The collaboration received positive response from gospel, jazz and "quiet storm" formats.

One year later, Adams followed with Save the World, which included her first signature song "The Battle Is The Lord's". Her next release was 1995's More Than a Melody, which featured more production work from Tankard with contributions from O'Landa Draper, and BeBe Winans. The single "Gotta Have Love", from that album featuring Tony Terry on background vocals, gained mainstream notoriety and was her first single and music video. Yolanda... Live in Washington, released the following year, featured versions of material from her first three albums. The footage from this recording was released as a collection of two videos on VHS initially, and later as a single set on DVD and CD. During this time Tribute Records' parent company Diadem Music Group merged with Benson Music Group, which was eventually bought by New York-based Zomba/Verity Records.

Songs from the Heart was her final release for Verity Records, including "Only Believe", which was a popular song on contemporary radio. The album also included "Still I Rise", a dedication to Rosa Parks, which was inspired by the Maya Angelou poem of the same name.

=== Mainstream breakthrough ===
Adams' first significant attention outside the urban contemporary gospel arena came with the release of Mountain High... Valley Low in 1999 on Elektra Records. Several mainstream artists and producers helped in the production of this album including Jimmy Jam and Terry Lewis (Janet Jackson, Boyz II Men), James "Big Jim" Wright (Mariah Carey, Nicole C. Mullen), Warryn Campbell (Mary Mary, Brandy), and Keith Thomas (BeBe & CeCe Winans). The album went 2× Platinum in 2000 and won Adams a Grammy Award. Notable singles from the album include "Yeah", "Fragile Heart", and "Open My Heart." "Fragile Heart" was dedicated to the memory of Adams' long-time road manager, who died in 1998.

In 2000, Adams released a Christmas album, and in 2001, she released a live album (The Experience). The Experience netted Adams a second Grammy Award for Best Contemporary Soul Gospel Album. Believe, which included the hit "Never Give Up" was released in 2001 and reached gold status according to the Recording Industry Association of America (RIAA). She would later go on to perform this song at "The Salute to Gospel Music" at the White House during President George W. Bush's administration. In 2001, Adams also released a compilation CD entitled The Divas of Gospel; it included the legendary Grammy Award winner Albertina Walker, who was popularly referred to as the "Queen of Gospel Music" until her death in 2010.

Adams recorded a song for the 2003 film Honey entitled "I Believe", which played during the last scene in the final dance.

Adams was also a judge for the 2nd annual Independent Music Awards to support independent artists' careers.

=== Day By Day ===
After nearly four years without releasing an album, Adams returned in 2005 with Day By Day. Although charting higher than Mountain High...Valley Low on the Billboard 100 and Billboard R&B Albums chart, it did not receive RIAA certification. The album featured the singles "Be Blessed", "Someone Watching Over You", "This Too Shall Pass", and "Victory" (which was prominently featured in the movie The Gospel).

After ending her long association with Atlantic Records, Atlantic released a greatest hits collection entitled The Best of Me in May 2007.

Adams signed with Columbia Records in 2007. Columbia released What a Wonderful Time, her second holiday collection, in October 2007. "Hold On" was released as the lead single.

=== Morning radio show and book release ===
The Yolanda Adams Morning Show
- Genre: Comedy, talk, urban contemporary gospel
- Running time: approx. 4 hours
- Country of origin: United States
- Home station: KMJQ-FM
- Starring: Yolanda Adams
- Original release: 2007 – 2016
- Website: theyolandaadamsmorningshow.com

After the release of What a Wonderful Time, Adams embarked on the radio career with The Yolanda Adams Morning Show.

On December 25, 2009, Adams performed on BET's The Mo'Nique Show, where she sang "Already Alright", from her 1999 Mountain High...Valley Low album.

In 2010, Adams released her book "Points of Power", based on one of the segments of her radio show Points of Power.

Adams appeared on the 2011 BET Honors to sing her signature song "The Battle Is the Lord's" in honor of Cicely Tyson. Later, Adams appeared at the 53rd Grammy Awards, taking part in a tribute to Aretha Franklin along with Jennifer Hudson, Christina Aguilera, Florence Welch from Florence and the Machine, and Martina McBride. Adams performed "Spirit in the Dark" – Franklin's classic from 1970. On several occasions, Franklin stated that she "especially loved" Adams' performance. She performed at 2011 BET tribute to Cicely Tyson.

=== Becoming ===
Adams' 11th studio album, Becoming, was released on May 3, 2011, produced by Steve Bracey. The new single, "Be Still", by Donald "Drathoven" Atkins Jr., debuted on Tuesday, April 19 on The Yolanda Adams Morning Show. Becoming was released by Walmart as an exclusive deal. At The BET Awards 2012, Adams' won the award for Best Gospel Artist for the fourth time.

=== Sunny Days– ===
On an April 2013 episode of BET's Lift Every Voice, Adams announced that she was working on her twelfth album. She announced songwriting and producing credits from the likes of gospel producers Donald Lawrence, Israel Houghton and Kirk Franklin. No album was released until 2024: Sunny Days. Its lead single, "Church Doors", was nominated for the Grammy Award for Best Gospel Performance/Song.

== Book release ==
Adams released her first book Points of Power in 2010. It is a Christian book in reference to living a pure, spirit-filled Christian life.

== Personal life ==
Adams was married to Troy Mason from 1987 until 1990. Adams said spousal abuse was the reason for their divorce. In 1997, Adams married former NFL player Tim Crawford. The couple divorced in August 2004 after seven years. Adams and Crawford have one daughter, Taylor Ayanna Crawford, born in 2001.

Adams was inducted into Alpha Kappa Alpha sorority as an honorary member on July 8, 2018.

== Discography ==
- 1987: Just as I Am
- 1991: Through the Storm
- 1993: Save the World
- 1995: More Than a Melody
- 1996: Yolanda... Live in Washington
- 1998: Songs from the Heart
- 1999: Mountain High... Valley Low
- 2000: Christmas with Yolanda Adams
- 2001: The Experience
- 2001: Believe
- 2005: Day by Day
- 2007: What a Wonderful Time
- 2011: Becoming
- 2024: Sunny Days

== Filmography ==
Year	Title	Role	Notes
1997	In the House	Yolanda	Episode: "God Is in the House"
2004	The Parkers	Karla	Episode: "Practice What You Preach"
2005	The Gospel (film)	Herself	
2016	Ride Along 2	Preacher	
2016	The Passion: New Orleans	Gospel Singer	
2020	Blue's Clues & You!	The Sun (voice)	3 episodes
2022–present	Kingdom Business	Denita Jordan	Lead role

== Awards ==
In total, Adams has won four Grammy Awards, sixteen Stellar Gospel Music Awards, four of the Gospel Music Association's Dove Awards, one American Music Award, seven NAACP Image Awards, one Soul Train Music Award, and five BET Awards. In 2022, she was inducted into the Black Music & Entertainment Walk of Fame.

== See also ==
- List of best-selling gospel music artists
