= Top Gospel Albums =

Billboard magazine chart

Top Gospel Albums is a music chart published weekly by Billboard magazine in the United States, ranking the popularity of gospel albums. As of Tuesday, January 31, 2017 (with the charts dated February 11, 2017), it uses the same multi-metric methodology developed for the Billboard 200, which incorporates traditional album sales, track equivalent albums (TEA) and streaming equivalent albums (SEA).

== History ==
Date range	Title
January 30, 1965 — July 10, 1965	Hot Spiritual LP's
October 6, 1973 — March 1, 1980	Best Selling Gospel LPs
April 5, 1980 — September 1984	Best Selling Spiritual LPs
October 1984 — March 1990	Top Spiritual Albums
April 1990 — present	Top Gospel Albums

== Album milestones ==
=== Most cumulative weeks at number one ===
List of albums with ten or more weeks at number one, showing year released.

Album	Wks.	Year	Artist	Ref.
Donda	170	2021	Kanye West	
Jesus Is King	67	2019	Kanye West	
It Remains to Be Seen	53	1993	The Mississippi Mass Choir	
The Nu Nation Project	49	1998	Kirk Franklin	
The Mississippi Mass Choir	46	1988	The Mississippi Mass Choir	
God's Property from Kirk Franklin's Nu Nation	43	1997	Kirk Franklin	
Thirsty	39	2007	Marvin Sapp	
Is My Living in Vain	37	1980	The Clark Sisters	
Live in London and More...	37	2001	Donnie McClurkin	
Kirk Franklin and the Family	36	1993	Kirk Franklin	
Love Alive III	34	1984	Walter Hawkins	
Hero	34	2005	Kirk Franklin	
Live in Chicago	33	1988	Shirley Caesar with Reverend Milton Brunson and the Thompson Community Singers	
Mountain High...Valley Low	32	1999	Yolanda Adams	
The Sound	32	2008	Mary Mary	
Whatcha Lookin' 4	30	1996	Kirk Franklin	
Best Days	30	2012	Tamela Mann	
There is Hope	29	1986	Reverend Milton Brunson and the Thompson Community Singers	
The Rebirth of Kirk Franklin	29	2002	Kirk Franklin	
My Mind is Made Up	27	1991	Reverend Milton Brunson and the Thompson Community Singers	
The Preacher's Wife	26	1996	Whitney Houston	
Heart. Passion. Pursuit.	24	2017	Tasha Cobbs Leonard	
Here I Am	23	2010	Marvin Sapp	
Rough Side of the Mountain	28	1983	Rev. F.C. Barnes & Rev. Janice Brown	
Dedicated	21	1985	Nicholas	
One Way	20	2016	Tamela Mann	
Love Alive IV	19	1990	Walter Hawkins	
We Walk By Faith	19	1992	Rev. John P. Kee & the New Life Community Choir	
Hello Fear	19	2011	Kirk Franklin	
More Than This	19	2024	CeCe Winans	
It's Gonna Rain	18	1982	Reverend Milton Brunson and the Thompson Community Singers	
We Sing Praises	17	1983	Sandra Crouch and Friends	
Blessed	17	1985	The Williams Brothers	
Soul Survivor	17	1987	Al Green	
It Remains to Be Seen...	17	1993	The Mississippi Mass Choir	
Old Church Basement	17	2021	Elevation Worship & Maverick City Music	
Love Alive	16	1976	Walter Hawkins & the Love Center Choir	
Losing My Religion	16	2015	Kirk Franklin	
Live with the Mississippi Mass Choir	15	1990	Reverend James Moore with the Mississippi Mass Choir	
The Live Experience	15	1995	Helen Baylor	
Pages of Life - Chapters I & II	15	1998	Fred Hammond	
WOW Gospel 2004	15	2004	Various Artists	
Psalms, Hymns & Spiritual Songs	15	2005	Donnie McClurkin	
Psalms	14	1984	The Richard Smallwood Singers	
One Lord, One Faith, One Baptism	13	1987	Aretha Franklin	
Incredible	13	2002	Mary Mary	
Rehab	13	2010	Lecrae	
Long Live Love	13	2019	Kirk Franklin	
Somethin' 'Bout Love	12	2004	Fred Hammond	
Phenomenon	11	1991	The Rance Allen Group	
Different Lifestyles	11	1991	BeBe & CeCe Winans	
Kirk Franklin & the Family Christmas	11	1995	Kirk Franklin	
Gravity	11	2012	Lecrae	
Alabaster Box	10	1999	CeCe Winans	
Donnie McClurkin... Again	10	2003	Donnie McClurkin	
WOW Gospel 2016	10	2016	Various Artists	
Hiding Place	10	2018	Tori Kelly	

=== Most cumulative weeks on chart ===
List of albums with 100 or more total weeks on the chart.

Album	Wks.	Artist	Ref.
Playlist: The Very Best Of Marvin Sapp	543	Marvin Sapp	
Hello Fear	490	Kirk Franklin	
Best Days	489	Tamela Mann	
Grace	487	Tasha Cobbs Leonard	
Heart. Passion. Pursuit.	438	Tasha Cobbs Leonard	
The Nu Nation Project	386	Kirk Franklin	
One Place Live	374	Tasha Cobbs Leonard	
The Essential Kirk Franklin	367	Kirk Franklin	
Jesus Is King	361	Kanye West	
Unstoppable	329	Koryn Hawthorne	
Go Get It	286	Mary Mary	
Donda	265	Kanye West	
Move Your Heart	259	Maverick City Music & UPPERROOM	
Believe for It	253	CeCe Winans	
The Best of Me	247	Yolanda Adams	
Old Church Basement	246	Elevation Worship & Maverick City Music	
The Rebirth of Kirk Franklin	238	Kirk Franklin	
God's Property from Kirk Franklin's Nu Nation	230	Kirk Franklin	
Jesus Is Born	212	Sunday Service	
Maverick City Vol. 3 Part 1	204	Maverick City Music	
One Way	200	Tamela Mann	
Love Alive	200	Walter Hawkins & the Love Center Choir	
Jesus is the Best Thing That Ever Happened to Me	198	James Cleveland & the Charles Fold Singers	
Love Alive II	193	Walter Hawkins & the Love Center Choir	
Rough Side of the Mountain	190	Rev. F.C. Barnes & Rev. Janice Brown	
Kingdom Book One	187	Maverick City Music X Kirk Franklin	
Losing My Religion	183	Kirk Franklin	
Kirk Franklin and the Family	182	Kirk Franklin	
God Has Smiled on Me	177	James Cleveland & the Voices of Tabernacle	
It's a New Day	169	James Cleveland & the Southern California Community Choir	
The Preacher's Wife	169	Whitney Houston	
Amazing Grace	167	Aretha Franklin with James Cleveland	
Long Live Love	164	Kirk Franklin	
It Remains to Be Seen	156	Mississippi Mass Choir	
I Don't Feel Noways Tired	155	James Cleveland & the Salem Inspirational Choir	
Make Room	155	Jonathan McReynolds	
Dedicated	141	Nicholas	
Thirsty	141	Marvin Sapp	
The Best Of Fred Hammond	133	Fred Hammond	
Wonderful	131	Edwin Hawkins & the Edwin Hawkins Singers	
Thankful	123	Mary Mary	
Everyday Jesus	122	Anthony Brown & group therAPy	
Pages of Life - Chapters I & II	122	Fred Hammond	
As We Worship: Live	121	William McDowell	
Tramaine	117	Tramaine Hawkins	
Mary Mary	117	Mary Mary	
Jubilee: Juneteenth Edition	117	Maverick City Music	
The Essential Donnie Mcclurkin	117	Donnie McClurkin	
Jesus Christ is the Way	116	Walter Hawkins and the Family	
The Journey (Live)	114	Donnie McClurkin	
The Maverick Way Complete: Complete Vol 02	113	Maverick City Music	
Save the World	112	Yolanda Adams	
Live in Chicago	110	Shirley Caesar	
Hero	110	Kirk Franklin	
No Time to Lose	109	Andraé Crouch	
We Sing Praises	109	Sandra Crouch and Friends	
Live in London and More...	108	Donnie McClurkin	
Purpose By Design	106	Fred Hammond & Radical For Christ	
Give Me a Clean Heart	105	James Cleveland	
Greatest Hits	105	BeBe & CeCe Winans	
Alabaster Box	105	CeCe Winans	
Whatcha Lookin' 4	105	Kirk Franklin	
The Fight of My Life	105	Kirk Franklin	
Nothing But the Hits	105	Fred Hammond	
I'll Do His Will	104	James Cleveland & the Southern California Community Choir	
Adoration: Live in Atlanta	104	Richard Smallwood with Vision	
A Miracle in Harlem	104	Shirley Caesar	
WOW Gospel 1998	104	Various Artists	
Donnie McClurkin	104	Donnie McClurkin	
Donnie McClurkin... Again	104	Donnie McClurkin	
Mountain High...Valley Low	104	Yolanda Adams	
The Spirit of David	104	Fred Hammond & Radical For Christ	
Live in Detroit	104	Vickie Winans	
Throne Room	104	CeCe Winans	
I Need You Now	104	Smokie Norful	
Nothing Without You	104	Smokie Norful	
Somethin' 'Bout Love	104	Fred Hammond	
Alive in South Africa	104	Israel & New Breed	
Maverick City, Vol. 3 Part 2	104	Maverick City Music	
Awesome Wonder	103	Kurt Carr & the Kurt Carr Singers	
Bringing It All Together	103	Vickie Winans	
Live from Another Level	103	Israel & New Breed	
Psalms, Hymns & Spiritual Songs	103	Donnie McClurkin	
20/85 The Experience	103	Hezekiah Walker & LFC	
Yolanda... Live in Washington	102	Yolanda Adams	
Believe	102	Yolanda Adams	
Gospel Greats	101	Aretha Franklin	
The Inner Court	101	Fred Hammond & Radical For Christ	
Alone in His Presence	101	CeCe Winans	
WOW Gospel 2004	101	Various Artists	
Show Up!	101	The New Life Community Choir featuring John P. Kee	
The Best of Yolanda Adams	100	Yolanda Adams	
Day By Day	100	Yolanda Adams	
After the Music Stops	100	Lecrae	

=== Number-one debuts ===
List of albums which have debuted at number-one.

==== 1990s ====
Song	Debut date	Artist	Ref.
Kirk Franklin & the Family Christmas	November 25, 1995	Kirk Franklin	
The Nu Nation Project	October 17, 1998	Kirk Franklin	
The Preacher's Wife	December 14, 1996	Whitney Houston	
Everlasting Love	April 11, 1998	CeCe Winans	
Mountain High...Valley Low	October 9, 1999	Yolanda Adams	

==== 2000s ====
Song	Debut date	Artist	Ref.
Love and Freedom	September 16, 2000	BeBe	
Christmas with Yolanda Adams	December 16, 2000	Yolanda Adams	
Believe	December 22, 2001	Yolanda Adams	
Donnie McClurkin... Again	March 22, 2003	Donnie McClurkin	
Incredible	August 3, 2002	Mary Mary	
Speak Those Things: POL Chapter 3	September 28, 2002	Fred Hammond	
Bringing It All Together	May 24, 2003	Vickie Winans	
Throne Room	September 27, 2003	CeCe Winans	
Smokie Norful: Limited Edition (EP)	November 8, 2003	Smokie Norful	
Live from Another Level	May 29, 2004	Israel & New Breed	
Somethin' 'Bout Love	June 26, 2004	Fred Hammond	
Crossroads	September 11, 2004	Deitrick Haddon	
I Owe You	September 25, 2004	Kierra Sheard	
Nothing Without You	October 23, 2004	Smokie Norful	
Mary Mary	August 6, 2005	Mary Mary	
Day By Day	September 17, 2005	Yolanda Adams	
Purified	October 1, 2005	CeCe Winans	
Victory Live!	June 10, 2006	Tye Tribbett & G.A.	
This Is Me	July 15, 2006	Kierra Sheard	
Free to Worship	October 21, 2006	Fred Hammond	
This Is Who I Am	November 11, 2006	Kelly Price	
Kirk Franklin Presents: Songs for the Storm Vol. 1	November 25, 2006	Kirk Franklin	
The Best of Me	May 26, 2007	Yolanda Adams	
Live – One Last Time	April 28, 2007	The Clark Sisters	
Journey: Live in New York	June 23, 2007	Richard Smallwood with Vision	
Thirsty	July 21, 2007	Marvin Sapp	
A Deeper Level: Live	September 22, 2007	Israel & New Breed	
Alone But Not Alone	October 13, 2007	Marvin Winans	
Thy Kingdom Come	April 19, 2008	CeCe Winans	
Stand Out	May 24, 2008	Tye Tribbett & G.A.	
Rebel	October 18, 2008	Lecrae	
The Sound	November 8, 2008	Mary Mary	
Smokie Norful Live	April 25, 2009	Smokie Norful	

==== 2010s ====
Song	Debut date	Artist	Ref.
Here I Am	April 3, 2010	Marvin Sapp	
Refreshed by Fire	October 2, 2010	Shekinah Glory Ministry	
Rehab	October 16, 2010	Lecrae	
Fresh	November 6, 2010	Tye Tribbett	
Church on the Moon	February 12, 2011	Deitrick Haddon	
Hello Fear	April 9, 2011	Kirk Franklin	
Angel & Chanelle	June 18, 2011	Trin-i-tee 5:7	
Promises	August 6, 2011	Richard Smallwood with Vision	
YRM (Your Righteous Mind)	August 27, 2011	Donald Lawrence & Co.	
Uncommon Me	September 10, 2011	Isaac Carree	
The Awakening of Le'Andria Johnson	September 24, 2011	Le'Andria Johnson	
Free	November 5, 2011	Kierra Sheard	
Identity	February 4, 2012	James Fortune & FIYA	
God, Love & Romance	February 18, 2012	Fred Hammond	
I Win	April 21, 2012	Marvin Sapp	
Go Get It	May 26, 2012	Mary Mary	
Gravity	September 22, 2012	Lecrae	
United Tenors: Hammond, Hollister, Roberson, Wilson	April 13, 2013	Fred Hammond	
Reset	July 13, 2013	Isaac Carree	
Greater Than	August 24, 2013	Tye Tribbett	
R.E.D. (Restoring Everything Damaged)	September 21, 2013	Deitrick Haddon	
20 Year Celebration - Vol. 1: Best For Last	October 12, 2013	Donald Lawrence & Co.	
Church Clothes, Vol. 2	November 23, 2013	Lecrae	
Dear Future Me	March 15, 2014	James Fortune & FIYA	
Deitrick Haddon's LXW	May 10, 2014	Deitrick Haddon	
Graceland	August 14, 2014	Kierra Sheard	
I Will Trust	December 6, 2014	Fred Hammond	
Help 2.0	April 18, 2015	Erica Campbell	
It's Personal	June 6, 2015	Tina Campbell	
You Shall Live	June 20, 2015	Marvin Sapp	
Anthology: Live	July 18, 2015	Richard Smallwood with Vision	
Covered: Alive in Asia	August 15, 2015	Israel & New Breed	
One Place Live	September 12, 2015	Tasha Cobbs Leonard	
Everyday Jesus	August 8, 2015	Anthony Brown & group therAPy	
Life Music: Stage Two	October 10, 2015	Jonathan McReynolds	
Masterpiece	November 28, 2015	Deitrick Haddon	
The Journey (Live)	September 10, 2016	Donnie McClurkin	
One Way	October 1, 2016	Tamela Mann	
Worship Journal: Live	October 22, 2016	Fred Hammond	
Secret Place: Live In South Africa	November 26, 2016	VaShawn Mitchell	
Let Them Fall in Love	February 25, 2017	CeCe Winans	
Dear Future Me	July 15, 2017	James Fortune	
Love and Freedom	August 5, 2017	Anita Wilson accompanied by the Company	
A Long Way from Sunday	August 19, 2017	Anthony Brown & group therAPy	
The Maranda Curtis Experience (EP)	August 26, 2017	Maranda Curtis	
Heart. Passion. Pursuit.	September 16, 2017	Tasha Cobbs Leonard	
Close	October 21, 2017	Marvin Sapp	
The Bloody Win	November 4, 2017	Tye Tribbett	
Make Room	March 24, 2018	Jonathan McReynolds	
Open Heaven: The Maranda Experience	May 12, 2018	Maranda Curtis	
Unstoppable	July 28, 2018	Koryn Hawthorne	
Amazing Grace: The Complete Recordings	August 25, 2018	Aretha Franklin	
Heart. Passion. Pursuit.: Live at Passion City Church	November 17, 2018	Tasha Cobbs Leonard	
Long Live Love	June 15, 2019	Kirk Franklin	
Dream Again	September 7, 2019	James Fortune	
I Made It Out	September 28, 2019	John P. Kee	
2econd Wind: Ready	November 2, 2019	Anthony Brown & group therAPy	
Jesus Is King	November 9, 2019	Kanye West	

==== 2020s ====
Song	Debut date	Artist	Ref.
Kierra	May 2, 2020	Kierra Sheard	
Royalty: Live at the Ryman	October 10, 2020	Tasha Cobbs Leonard	
Move Your Heart	February 13, 2021	Maverick City Music	
Old Church Basement	May 15, 2021	Elevation Worship & Maverick City Music	
Feels Like Home, Vol. 1	March 13, 2021	Israel & New Breed	
Believe for It	March 27, 2021	CeCe Winans	
Donda	September 11, 2021	Kanye West	
The Mav Way: EP Vol. 1, The Maverick Way	September 30, 2023	Maverick City Music, Chandler Moore & Naomi Raine	
Father's Day	October 21, 2023	Kirk Franklin	
The Maverick Way Complete: Complete Vol 02	November 11, 2023	Maverick City Music, Chandler Moore & Naomi Raine	
More Than This	May 11, 2024	CeCe Winans	
Overflow: The Album	June 1, 2024	Transformation Worship	
Tasha	August 9, 2025	Tasha Cobbs Leonard	

== Artist achievements ==
=== Most number-one albums ===
Artists with five or more number-one albums.

Artist	No.	Ref.
Kirk Franklin	14	
James Cleveland	13	
CeCe Winans	10	
Fred Hammond	10	
Reverend Milton Brunson and the Thompson Community Singers	7	
Lecrae	6	
Tasha Cobbs Leonard	6	
Walter Hawkins	5	
Yolanda Adams	5	
Donnie McClurkin	5	
Mary Mary	5	
Marvin Sapp	5	
Deitrick Haddon	5	
Tye Tribbett	5	
Smokie Norful	5	

== Other achievements ==
- Whitney Houston's The Preacher's Wife has the highest one week sales of any charting release on Top Gospel Albums, selling 330,000 units in the chart week dated January 4, 1997.
- Marvin Sapp's Here I Am (2010) was the highest-charting gospel album in the history of the all-genre Billboard 200 chart, where it debuted at number 2, before the release of Jesus Is King (2019) by Kanye West. Prior to this, God’s Property From Kirk Franklin’s Nu Nation debuted and peaked at number 3 on June 14, 1997.
- Kanye West made Billboard history with the release of Jesus Is King (2019), which topped Top Gospel Albums, Top R&B/Hip-Hop Albums, Top Rap Albums charts, Top Christian Albums and the all-genre Billboard 200 simultaneously.
- Kanye West has the highest one week sales — 309,000 (Donda) and 264,000 (Jesus Is King) — for a charting release on both Top Gospel Albums and Top Christian Albums, since both charts adopted a multi-metric methodology in February 2017.
- Kierra Sheard's Kierra (2020) ended Kanye's 6-month run at number-one with his album Jesus Is King.
- CeCe Winans has topped the Top Gospel Albums chart in five consecutive decades, earning her 10th number-one with More Than This (2024).

== See also ==
- Hot Gospel Songs
- Top Christian Albums
- Top Holiday Albums
