= Cross Rhythms (magazine) =

UK Christian music magazine

- Cover of the final issue of Cross Rhythms, published in summer 2005
- Editor: Tony Cummings
- Photographer: Ian Homer
- Categories: Contemporary Christian music
- Frequency: Quarterly
- Circulation: 15,000
- Publisher: Cornerstone House
- Founder: Tony Cummings
- First issue: May 1990
- Final issue Number: 9 August 2005; 85
- Company: Cross Rhythms
- Country: United Kingdom
- Based in: Stoke-on-Trent
- Language: English
- Website: web.archive.org/web/20051129020545/http://www.crossrhythms.co.uk:80/
- ISSN: 0967-540X
- OCLC: 500051110

Cross Rhythms was the eponymously titled music magazine, founded by Tony Cummings produced by the Christian media organisation of the same name.

Cross Rhythms centered almost exclusively on contemporary Christian music, with only the occasional review of more mainstream music. Each issue included interviews with musicians and bands, reviews of various albums and compilations, and features on music festivals or productions. Each issue also included a CD, narrated by Mike Rimmer, containing a selection of the songs featured in the magazine. Later issues featured Edges, a series of commentaries on major issues by communicator Mal Fletcher, and That Mysterious Cross, a series on the Christian cross by Chip Kendall of thebandwithnoname.

== Background ==
Before Tony Cummings founded Cross Rhythms, he began as a journalist in 1963 in a black music fanzine originally called Soul, then Soul Music Monthly, and finally Shout. By 1971, he was writing occasionally for Record Mirror. In 1973, he joined Black Music magazine as a staff writer, eventually becoming editor. Over the next few years, he interviewed artists such as Stevie Wonder, Earth, Wind & Fire, Michael Jackson and many more. He stopped writing for the magazine in 1976, and converted to Christianity in 1980. Within a year he was married, and began to write for the Christian magazine Buzz. Cummings was offered the position of assistant editorship, and interviewed people such as Rev. Ian Paisley and Cliff Richard.

== History ==
After Buzz magazine ended in 1986, Cummings founded Cross Rhythms Magazine with printer Mark Golding in April 1989, with the first issue being made available in May 1990. Two years later, publication of the magazine was taken over by Cornerstone House, a publishing company owned by Chris Cole.

During his years with Cross Rhythms, Cummings has interviewed multiple artists. He also mentored both Daniel Bedingfield and Natasha Bedingfield during their formative musical careers. He has produced albums for Word Records, as well as a number of charity records. Among these was the Agents of Grace compilation, in aid of the suffering in Sudan. He has given seminars at various Christian festivals, such as Spring Harvest and Greenbelt Festival.

After partnering with Christian radio station United Christian Broadcasters (UCB) in 1995, the magazine was given more financial stability. Around this time, Cross Rhythms had a circulation of approximately 15,000. In December 1993, the magazine began giving away a free cassette on the cover, featuring tracks from the latest Christian artists. In February 1999, the format changed to a free CD.

Around 2000, Cross Rhythms's official website was launched, which continued online after the paper magazine ceased publication in the summer of 2005 with its 85th issue. As of August 2009, the website is the sixth most viewed Christian website in the UK. By 2005, it became online only, after the paper version started to run up debts. The website, of which the music news, articles and interviews play a huge part, was the UK's most visited Christian website. As of November 2024, it was sitting at 6th.
