= Kirk Franklin discography =

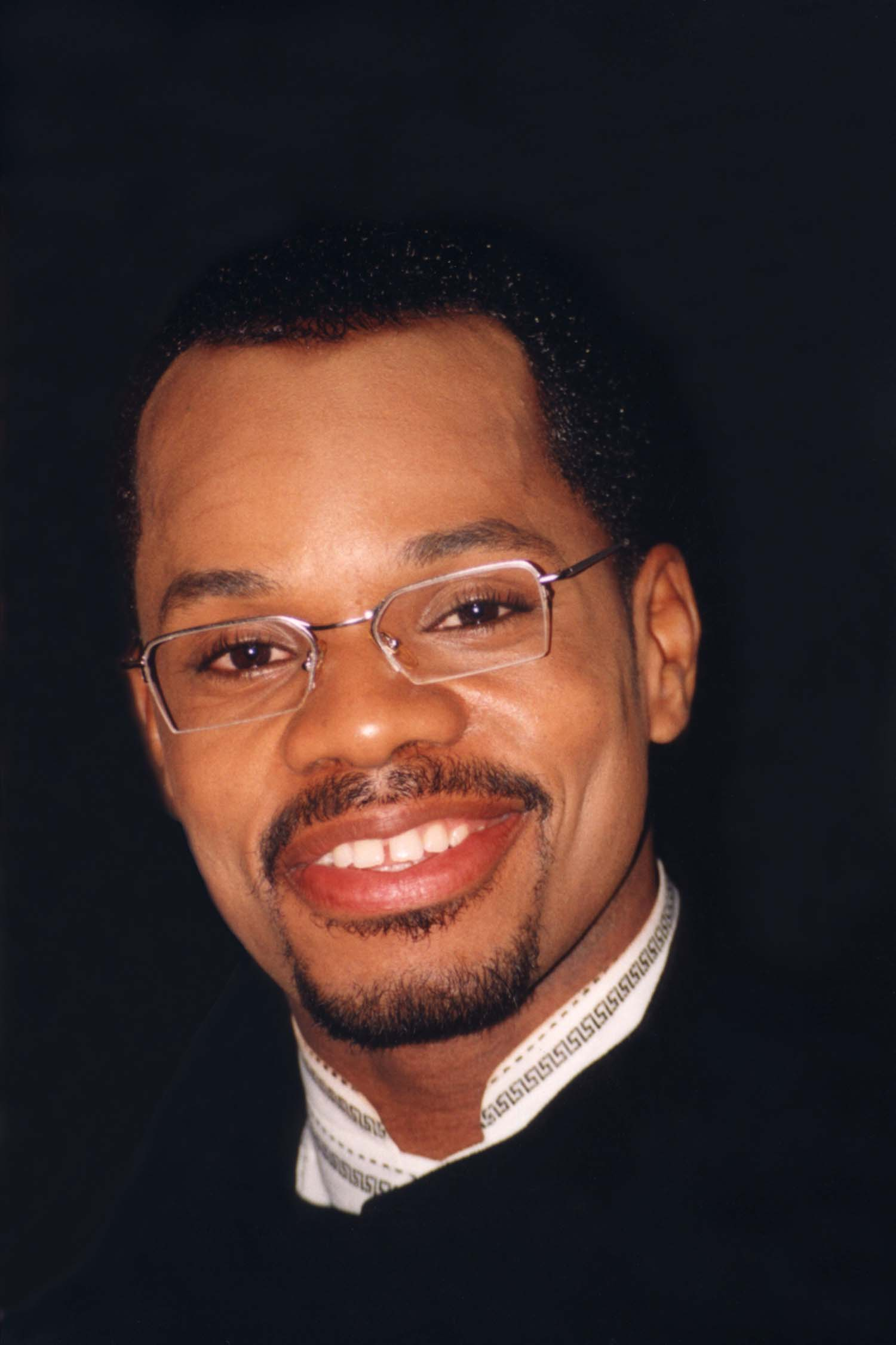
- Studio albums: 14
- Live albums: 4
- Compilation albums: 4

This is the discography of American gospel artist Kirk Franklin. In total, Franklin has won 20 Grammy Awards, 13 Dove Awards and 28 Stellar Awards. Franklin is the best-selling contemporary gospel artist of the SoundScan era and one of the best-selling gospel artists of all-time, with total sales exceeding 15 million, 14.6 of which are certified by the Recording Industry Association of America.

Kirk Franklin has the most number-one songs (8) and albums (14) on the US Billboard Hot Gospel Songs and Top Gospel Albums charts respectively. Franklin became the first artist to top all five of Billboard's main Gospel charts simultaneously—Long, Live, Love topped the Top Gospel Albums, whilst "OK" topped the Gospel Digital Song Sales and "Love Theory" led the Hot Gospel Songs, Gospel Airplay and Gospel Streaming Songs charts dated June 15, 2014.

== Albums ==
=== Studio albums ===
List of albums, with selected chart positions and sales figures
Title	Album details	Peak chart positions								Certifications
Title	Album details	US	US R&B /HH	US Gospel	US Christ.	JPN	KOR Int.	UK C&G	UK R&B	Certifications
God's Property from Kirk Franklin's Nu Nation	Released: May 27, 1997; Label: B-Rite, Interscope (#70007)	3	1	1	—	—	—	–	—	RIAA: 3× Platinum
The Nu Nation Project	Released: September 22, 1998; Label: GospoCentric, Interscope (#90178)	7	4	1	1	—	—	—	—	RIAA: 2× Platinum
Kirk Franklin Presents 1NC	Released: February 8, 2000; Label: B-Rite, Interscope (#4903252)	58	21	2	—	—	—	—	—	
Hero	Released: September 20, 2005; Label: Zomba Gospel LLC, GospoCentric, J (#82876710192)	13	4	1	1	119	—	—	—	RIAA: Platinum
The Fight of My Life	Released: December 18, 2007; Label: Zomba Gospel LLC, GospoCentric (#716772)	33	7	1	1	—	—	—	—	RIAA: Gold
Hello Fear	Released: March 22, 2011; Label: Verity Gospel Music Group (#77917)	5	3	1	—	—	—	20	—	RIAA: Gold
Losing My Religion	Released: November 13, 2015; Label: Fo Yo Soul, RCA (#88875139402)	10	3	1	—	—	27	2	24	
Long Live Love	Released: May 31, 2019; Label: Fo Yo Soul, RCA, Provident Label Group (#588990)	20	12	1	—	—	—	3	—	
Father's Day	Released: October 6, 2023; Label: Fo Yo Soul, RCA (#1702579219)	148	—	1	—	—	—	13	—	
I Am What I Am	Released: October 30, 2026; Label: Fo Yo Soul, Tribl Records	—	—	1	—	—	—	12	—	
"—" denotes releases that did not chart or were not released in that territory.

=== Live albums ===
List of live albums, with selected chart positions and sales figures
Title	Album details	Peak chart positions					Certifications
Title	Album details	US	US R&B /HH	US Gospel	US Christ.	UK C&G	Certifications
Kirk Franklin & the Family (with The Family)	Released: June 29, 1993; Label: B-Rite, Gospocentric (#70010), Sparrow (#G2-72119)	58	6	1	1	—	RIAA: Platinum
Whatcha Lookin' 4 (with The Family)	Released: April 30, 1996; Label: B-Rite, GospoCentric (#GCD 2127)	23	3	1	1	—	RIAA: Platinum
The Rebirth of Kirk Franklin	Released: February 19, 2002; Label: GospoCentric (#70037), Arista (#9223592)	4	4	1	1	—	RIAA: Platinum
Kingdom Book One (with Maverick City Music)	Released: June 17, 2022; Label: Tribl Records, Fo Yo Soul Entertainment, RCA Inspiration; Format: Digital download, streaming	151	—	2	2	5	
"—" denotes releases that did not chart or were not released in that territory.

=== Christmas albums ===
List of holiday albums, with selected chart positions and sales figures
Title	Album details	Peak chart positions					Certifications
Title	Album details	US	US R&B /HH	US Gospel	US Christ.	US Holiday	Certifications
Kirk Franklin & the Family Christmas	Released: November 7, 1995; Label: B-Rite, GospoCentric (#72130)	60	6	1	2	9	RIAA: Gold

=== Compilation albums ===
List of compilation albums, with selected chart positions and sales figures
Title	Album details	Peak chart positions				
Title	Album details	US	US R&B /HH	US Gospel	US Christ.	UK C&G
A Season of Remixes	Released: February 19, 2002; Label: B-Rite, GospoCentric (#70062)	—	—	—	—	—
Kirk Franklin Presents: Songs for the Storm Vol. 1	Released: November 7, 2006; Label: B-Rite, GospoCentric (#88401, #828768840122)	74	9	1	4	—
Setlist: The Very Best of Kirk Franklin Live	Released: December 27, 2011; Label: Verity, Legacy (#88691 90790 2)	—	59	11	—	—
The Essential Kirk Franklin	Released: January 24, 2012; Label: Legacy (#88691 91513 2)	—	50	1	—	10
"—" denotes releases that did not chart or were not released in that territory.

== Singles ==
=== As a lead artist ===
Title	Year	Peak chart positions								Certifications	Album
Title	Year	US	US R&B /HH	US Adult R&B	US Gospel	NLD	NZ	POL	UK	Certifications	Album
"Why We Sing" (with The Family)	1993	—	— (Note: "Why We Sing" did not enter the US Billboard Hot R&B/Hip-Hop Songs chart, but peaked at number 28 on the R&B/Hip-Hop Airplay chart.)	9	—	—	—	—	—	RIAA: Gold	Kirk Franklin & the Family
"Now Behold the Lamb" (with The Family)	1995	—	— (Note: "Now Behold the Lamb" did not enter the US Billboard Hot R&B/Hip-Hop Songs chart, but peaked at number 24 on the US Bubbling Under Hot R&B/Hip-Hop Songs chart.)	—	— (Note: "Now Behold the Lamb" did not enter the US Billboard Hot Gospel Songs chart, but peaked at number 3 on the US Gospel Digital Song Sales chart and number 4 on the US Gospel Streaming Songs chart.)	—	—	—	—		Kirk Franklin & the Family Christmas
"Don't Give Up" (with Hezekiah Walker, Donald Lawrence & Karen Clark-Sheard as the Island Inspirational All-Stars)	1996	— (Note: "Don't Give Up" did not enter the US Billboard Hot 100, but peaked at number 8 on the US Bubbling Under Hot 100 chart.)	28	—	—	—	—	—	—		Don't Be a Menace to South Central While Drinking Your Juice in the Hood: The Soundtrack
"Melodies from Heaven" (with The Family)	1996	—	—	21	— (Note: "Melodies from Heaven" did not enter the US Billboard Hot Gospel Songs chart, but peaked at number 14 on the US Gospel Streaming Songs chart.)	—	—	—	—		Whatcha Lookin' 4
"Stomp" (with God's Property featuring Cheryl "Salt" James)	1997	— (Note: "Stomp" did not enter the US Billboard Hot 100, but peaked at number 56 on the US Radio Songs chart, number 34 on the US Mainstream Top 40 chart and number 12 on the US Rhythmic chart.)	— (Note: "Stomp" did not enter the US Billboard Hot R&B/Hip-Hop Songs chart, but peaked at number 1 on the R&B/Hip-Hop Airplay chart.)	2	— (Note: "Stomp" did not enter the US Billboard Hot Gospel Songs chart, but peaked at number 4 on the US Gospel Digital Song Sales chart.)	88	—	—	60		God's Property from Kirk Franklin's Nu Nation
"You Are the Only One" (with God's Property)	1997	—	—	—	—	—	—	—	—		God's Property from Kirk Franklin's Nu Nation
"Lean on Me" (featuring Mary J. Blige, Bono, R. Kelly, Crystal Lewis & The Family)	1998	79	26	2	— (Note: "Lean on Me" did not enter the US Billboard Hot Gospel Songs chart, but peaked at number 18 on the US Gospel Streaming Songs chart.)	57	27	5	—		The Nu Nation Project
"Revolution" (featuring Rodney "Darkchild" Jerkins)	1998	—	59	30	— (Note: "Revolution" did not enter the US Billboard Hot Gospel Songs chart, but peaked at number 3 on the US Gospel Streaming Songs chart.)	—	—	—	—		The Nu Nation Project
"Gonna Be a Lovely Day"	1999	—	—	—	—	—	—	—	—		The Nu Nation Project
"Nobody" (with 1NC)	2000	—	—	—	—	—	—	—	—		Kirk Franklin Presents 1NC
"Thank You" (with Mary Mary)	2001	—	— (Note: "Thank You" did not enter the US Billboard Hot R&B/Hip-Hop Songs chart, but peaked at number 5 on the US Bubbling Under Hot R&B/Hip-Hop Songs chart.)	32	—	—	—	—	—		Kingdom Come: The Soundtrack
"911" (with Bishop T.D. Jakes)	2002	—	— (Note: "911" did not enter the US Billboard Hot R&B/Hip-Hop Songs chart, but peaked at number 6 on the US Bubbling Under Hot R&B/Hip-Hop Songs chart.)	30	—	—	—	—	—		The Rebirth of Kirk Franklin
"Brighter Day"	2002	—	— (Note: "Brighter Day" did not enter the US Billboard Hot R&B/Hip-Hop Songs chart, but peaked at number 2 on the US Bubbling Under Hot R&B/Hip-Hop Songs chart.)	19	—	—	—	—	—		The Rebirth of Kirk Franklin
"Hosanna"	2002	—	—	—	— (Note: "Hosanna" did not enter the US Billboard Hot Gospel Songs chart, but peaked at number 12 on the US Gospel Digital Song Sales chart.)	—	—	—	—		The Rebirth of Kirk Franklin
"Wake Up" (with Trin-i-tee 5:7)	2005	—	—	—	36	—	—	—	—		Non-album single
"Looking for You"	2005	61	5	4	1	—	—	—	— (Note: "Looking for You" did not enter the UK Singles Chart, but peaked at number 87 on the UK Singles Downloads Chart and number 57 on the UK Physical Singles Chart.)		Hero
"Imagine Me"	2006	—	52	22	2	—	—	—	—	RIAA: Gold	Hero
"Look at Me Now"	2006	—	—	—	—	—	—	—	—		Kirk Franklin Presents: Songs for the Storm Vol. 1
"September"	2007	—	— (Note: "September" did not enter the US Billboard Hot R&B/Hip-Hop Songs chart, but peaked at number 2 on the US Bubbling Under Hot R&B/Hip-Hop Songs chart.)	17	26	—	—	—	—		Interpretations: Celebrating the Music of Earth, Wind & Fire
"Declaration (This is It)"	2007	— (Note: "Declaration (This is It)" did not enter the US Billboard Hot 100, but peaked at number 21 on the US Bubbling Under Hot 100 chart.)	35	13	1	—	—	—	—		The Fight of My Life
"Jesus"	2008	—	96	39	4	—	—	—	—		The Fight of My Life
"I Smile"	2011	85	12	1	1	—	—	—	—	RIAA: Platinum; RMNZ: Gold	Hello Fear
"A God Like You"	2011	—	—	—	10	—	—	—	—		Hello Fear
"Before I Die"	2011	—	89	38	—	—	—	—	—		Hello Fear
"Lean on Me" (featuring the Compassion Youth Choir)	2012	—	—	—	— (Note: "Lean on Me" did not enter the US Billboard Hot Gospel Songs chart, but peaked at number 12 on the US Gospel Digital Song Sales chart.)	—	—	—	—		Non-album single
"Wanna Be Happy?"	2015	—	38	2	—	—	—	—	—	RIAA: Gold	Losing My Religion
"123 Victory" (featuring Pharrell Williams)	2016	—	—	—	1	—	—	—	—		Losing My Religion
"My World Needs You" (featuring Sarah Reeves, Tasha Cobbs & Tamela Mann)	2017	—	—	—	4	—	—	—	—		Losing My Religion
"If You Don't Mind" (with Ledisi)	2017	—	—	—	10	—	—	—	—		Let Love Rule
"Love Theory"	2019	—	— (Note: "Love Theory" did not enter the US Billboard Hot R&B/Hip-Hop Songs chart, but peaked at number 18 on the R&B/Hip-Hop Airplay chart. and number 20 on the US Hot R&B Songs chart.)	3	1	—	—	—	—	RIAA: Gold	Long Live Love
"Just for Me"	2019	—	—	—	3	—	—	—	—		Long Live Love
"OK"	2019	—	—	—	6	—	—	—	—		Long Live Love
"Millionaire (Good Like That)" (with Tauren Wells)	2020	—	—	—	—	—	—	—	—		Citizen of Heaven
"Together" (with For King & Country and Tori Kelly)	2020	— (Note: "Together" did not enter the US Billboard Hot 100, but peaked at number 20 on the US Bubbling Under Hot 100 chart.)	—	—	—	—	—	—	—	RIAA: Gold	Burn the Ships (Deluxe Edition: Remixes & Collaborations)
"We Win" (with Lil Baby)	2021	—	— (Note: "We Win" did not enter the US Billboard Hot R&B/Hip-Hop Songs chart, but peaked at number 27 on the R&B/Hip-Hop Airplay chart and number 21 on the US Rap Airplay chart.)	—	1	—	—	—	—		Space Jam: A New Legacy (Original Motion Picture Soundtrack)
"Fall in Love at Christmas" (with Mariah Carey and Khalid)	2021	— (Note: "Fall in Love at Christmas" did not enter the US Billboard Hot 100 chart, but peaked at number 24 on the US Digital Song Sales chart.)	— (Note: "Fall in Love at Christmas" did not enter the US Billboard Hot R&B/Hip-Hop Songs chart, but peaked at number 45 on the R&B/Hip-Hop Airplay chart and number 24 on the US Hot R&B Songs chart.)	18	—	—	—	—	— (Note: "Fall in Love at Christmas" did not enter the UK Singles Chart, but peaked at number 57 on the UK Singles Downloads Chart.)		Non-album single
"All Things"	2023	—	—	—	5	—	—	—	—		Father's Day
"Try Love"	2023	—	—	—	8	—	—	—	—		Father's Day
"Needs"	2023	—	—	—	19	—	—	—	—		Father's Day
"Witness Me" (with Jacob Collier, Shawn Mendes and Stormzy)	2023	—	—	—	—	—	—	—	—		Djesse Vol. 4
"Thank God" (with T.I., Young Dro and Sunday Service Choir)	2024	—	—	—	6	—	—	—	—		Non-album single
"Do It Again"	2025	—	—	—	5	—	—	—	—		I Am What I Am
"Able"	2025	—	—	—	4	—	—	—	—		I Am What I Am
"Thank You for Everything" (with Karen Clark Sheard)	2026	—	—	—	4	—	—	—	—		I Am What I Am
"This Time" (with GloRilla)	2026	— (Note: "This Time" did not enter the US Billboard Hot 100, but peaked at number 20 on the US Bubbling Under Hot 100 chart.)	— (Note: "This Time" did not enter the US Billboard Hot R&B/Hip-Hop Songs chart, but peaked at number 29 on the R&B/Hip-Hop Airplay chart)	—	1	—	—	—	—		I Am What I Am
"—" denotes releases that did not chart or were not released in that territory.

=== As a featured artist ===
Title	Year	Peak chart positions				Certifications	Album
Title	Year	US R&B /HH	US Adult R&B	US Gospel	US Christ.	Certifications	Album
"There He Is" (Trinitee 5:7 featuring Kirk Franklin)	1999	—	—	—	—		Spiritual Love
"Shelter in the Rain" (Stevie Wonder featuring Kirk Franklin)	2005	93	25	—	—		A Time to Love
"O-o-h Child" (Donnie McClurkin featuring Kirk Franklin)	2005	—	36	13	—		Psalms, Hymns and Spiritual Songs
"I Get Joy" (Coko featuring Kirk Franklin)	2007	—	35	20	—		Grateful
"Lose My Soul" (Tobymac featuring Kirk Franklin & Mandisa)	2008	—	—	—	2		Portable Sounds
"Take Me to the King" (Tamela Mann featuring Kirk Franklin)	2012	44	9	1	—	RIAA: 2× Platinum	Best Days
"Made to Worship" (John P. Kee & New Life featuring Kirk Franklin)	2013	—	—	16	—		Life and Favor
"Bleed the Same" (Mandisa featuring TobyMac and Kirk Franklin)	2017	—	—	—	10		Out of the Dark
"Never Alone" (Tori Kelly featuring Kirk Franklin)	2018	—	25	1	14		Hiding Place
"Hello God" (Tamela Mann featuring Wyclef Jean and Kirk Franklin)	2026	—	—	25	—		Non-album single
"—" denotes releases that did not chart or were not released in that territory.

=== Charity singles ===
Title	Year	Peak chart positions		
Title	Year	US R&B /HH	US Adult R&B	US Gospel
"Are You Listening" (with Artists United for Haiti)	2010	28	26	8

== Other charted and certified songs ==
Title	Year	Peak chart positions										Certifications	Album
Title	Year	US	US R&B /HH (Note: Peaks on the Billboard Hot R&B/Hip-Hop Songs chart: For all except noted: For "Ultralight Beam":)	US Gospel	US Christ.	CAN	IRE	NZ Hot	SWE Heat.	UK	UK HH /R&B	Certifications	Album
"Jesus Is the Reason for the Season" (with The Family)	1993	—	— (Note: "Jesus Is the Reason for the Season" did not enter the US Billboard Hot R&B/Hip-Hop Songs chart, but peaked at number 50 on the R&B/Hip-Hop Airplay chart.)	—	—	—	—	—	—	—	—		Kirk Franklin & the Family Christmas
"My Life Is in Your Hands" (with God's Property)	1997	—	—	— (Note: "My Life Is in Your Hands" did not enter the US Billboard Hot Gospel Songs chart, but peaked at number 17 on the US Gospel Streaming Songs chart.)	—	—	—	—	—	—	—		God's Property from Kirk Franklin's Nu Nation
"The Storm Is Over Now" (with God's Property)	1997	—	—	— (Note: "The Storm Is Over Now" did not enter the US Billboard Hot Gospel Songs chart, but peaked at number 5 on the US Gospel Digital Song Sales chart.)	—	—	—	—	—	—	—		God's Property from Kirk Franklin's Nu Nation
"Something About the Name Jesus" (featuring Rance Allen and Men of Standard)	1998	—	—	— (Note: "Something About the Name Jesus" did not enter the US Billboard Hot Gospel Songs chart, but peaked at number 3 on the US Gospel Digital Song Sales chart.)	—	—	—	—	—	—	—	RIAA: Gold	The Nu Nation Project
"Don't Cry" (with Richard Smallwood)	2002	—	—	— (Note: "Don't Cry" did not enter the US Billboard Hot Gospel Songs chart, but peaked at number 6 on the US Gospel Digital Song Sales chart and number 11 on the US Gospel Streaming Songs chart.)	—	—	—	—	—	—	—		The Rebirth of Kirk Franklin
"Something About the Name Jesus" (Live) (The Rance Allen Group featuring Kirk Franklin)	2004	—	—	— (Note: "Something About the Name Jesus" (Live) did not enter the US Billboard Hot Gospel Songs chart, but peaked at number 1 on the US Gospel Digital Song Sales chart.)	—	—	—	—	—	—	—	RIAA: Gold	The Live Experience
"Hero" (with Dorinda Clark Cole)	2005	—	—	23	—	—	—	—	—	—	—		Hero
"Help Me Believe"	2009	—	—	23	—	—	—	—	—	—	—		The Fight of My Life
"Hello Fear"	2011	—	—	— (Note: "Hello Fear" did not enter the US Billboard Hot Gospel Songs chart, but peaked at number 7 on the US Gospel Digital Song Sales chart.)	—	—	—	—	—	—	—		Hello Fear
"I Am"	2011	—	—	27	—	—	—	—	—	—	—		Hello Fear
"But the Blood"	2011	—	—	— (Note: "But the Blood" did not enter the US Billboard Hot Gospel Songs chart, but peaked at number 21 on the US Gospel Digital Song Sales chart.)	—	—	—	—	—	—	—		Hello Fear
"Everyone Hurts"	2011	—	—	— (Note: "Everyone Hurts" did not enter the US Billboard Hot Gospel Songs chart, but peaked at number 23 on the US Gospel Digital Song Sales chart.)	—	—	—	—	—	—	—		Hello Fear
"Give Me" (featuring Mali Music)	2011	—	—	— (Note: "Give Me" did not enter the US Billboard Hot Gospel Songs chart, but peaked at number 7 on the US Gospel Digital Song Sales chart.)	—	—	—	—	—	—	—		Hello Fear
"The Altar" (featuring Marvin Sapp & Beverly Crawford)	2011	—	—	— (Note: "The Altar" did not enter the US Billboard Hot Gospel Songs chart, but peaked at number 14 on the US Gospel Digital Song Sales chart.)	—	—	—	—	—	—	—		Hello Fear
"Something About the Name Jesus Pt. 2" (featuring Rance Allen, Marvin Winans, John P. Kee & Isaac Carree)	2011	—	—	— (Note: "Something About the Name Jesus Pt. 2" did not enter the US Billboard Hot Gospel Songs chart, but peaked at number 16 on the US Gospel Digital Song Sales chart.)	—	—	—	—	—	—	—		Hello Fear
"So Glad" (featuring Isaac Carree featuring Kirk Franklin, Kierra Sheard & Lecrae)	2013	—	—	— (Note: "So Glad" did not enter the US Billboard Hot Gospel Songs chart, but peaked at number 13 on the US Gospel Digital Song Sales chart.)	—	—	—	—	—	—	—		Reset
"Road Trip"	2015	—	—	23	—	—	—	—	—	—	—		Losing My Religion
"Pray For Me"	2015	—	—	— (Note: "Pray For Me" did not enter the US Billboard Hot Gospel Songs chart, but peaked at number 14 on the US Gospel Digital Song Sales chart.)	—	—	—	—	—	—	—		Losing My Religion
"It's Time" (featuring Tasha Page-Lockhart & Zacardi Cortez)	2015	—	—	— (Note: "It's Time" did not enter the US Billboard Hot Gospel Songs chart, but peaked at number 13 on the US Gospel Digital Song Sales chart.)	—	—	—	—	—	—	—		Losing My Religion
"Over"	2015	—	—	25	—	—	—	—	—	—	—		Losing My Religion
"When" (featuring Kim Burrell & Lalah Hathaway)	2015	—	—	— (Note: "When" did not enter the US Billboard Hot Gospel Songs chart, but peaked at number 8 on the US Gospel Digital Song Sales chart.)	—	—	—	—	—	—	—		Losing My Religion
"Intercession"	2015	—	—	19	—	—	—	—	—	—	—		Losing My Religion
"Ultralight Beam" (Kanye West featuring Chance the Rapper and Kirk Franklin)	2016	67	22	—	—	88	78	10	5	63	15	RIAA: 2× Platinum; IFPA DAN: Gold; RMNZ: Platinum; BPI: Gold	The Life of Pablo
"Finish Line/Drown" (Chance The Rapper featuring T-Pain, Kirk Franklin, Eryn Allen Kane and Noname)	2016	—	— (Note: "Finish Line/Drown" did not enter the US Billboard Hot R&B/Hip-Hop Songs chart, but peaked at number 9 on the US Bubbling Under Hot R&B/Hip-Hop Songs chart.)	—	—	—	—	—	—	—	—	RIAA: Gold	Coloring Book
"We Three Kings"	2017	—	—	25	—	—	—	—	—	—	—		The Star: The Story of the First Christmas
"F.A.V.O.R"	2019	—	—	— (Note: "F.A.V.O.R" did not enter the US Billboard Hot Gospel Songs chart, but peaked at number 5 on the US Gospel Digital Song Sales chart.)	—	—	—	—	—	—	—		Long Live Love
"Strong God"	2019	—	—	17	—	—	—	—	—	—	—		Long Live Love
"Father Knows Best"	2019	—	—	18	—	—	—	—	—	—	—		Long Live Love
"Idols"	2019	—	—	19	—	—	—	—	—	—	—		Long Live Love
"Forever / Beautiful Grace"	2019	—	—	22	—	—	—	—	—	—	—		Long Live Love
"Spiritual"	2019	—	—	— (Note: "Spiritual" did not enter the US Billboard Hot Gospel Songs chart, but peaked at number 17 on the US Gospel Digital Song Sales chart.)	—	—	—	—	—	—	—		Long Live Love
"Wynter's Promise"	2019	—	—	— (Note: "Spiritual" did not enter the US Billboard Hot Gospel Songs chart, but peaked at number 14 on the US Gospel Digital Song Sales chart.)	—	—	—	—	—	—	—		Long Live Love
"Kingdom" (with Maverick City Music)	2022	—	—	5	17	—	—	—	—	—	—		Kingdom Book One
"Bless Me" (with Maverick City Music)	2022	—	—	6	19	—	—	—	—	—	—		Kingdom Book One
"Fear Is Not My Future" (with Maverick City Music featuring Brandon Lake & Chandler Moore)	2022	—	—	3	13	—	—	—	—	—	—		Kingdom Book One
"Jealous" (with Maverick City Music featuring Chandler Moore & Lizzie Morgan)	2022	—	—	—	47	—	—	—	—	—	—		Kingdom Book One
"Talkin Bout (Love)" (with Maverick City Music featuring Chandler Moore & Lizzie Morgan)	2022	—	—	3	13	—	—	—	—	—	—		Kingdom Book One
"Hold Tight" (with Maverick City Music featuring Ryan Ellis & Lizzie Morgan)	2022	—	—	— (Note: "Hold Tight" did not enter the US Billboard Hot Gospel Songs chart, but peaked at number 15 on the US Gospel Digital Song Sales chart.)	—	—	—	—	—	—	—		Kingdom Book One (Deluxe)
"God's Got Us" (with Maverick City Music featuring Chandler Moore)	2022	—	—	—	50	—	—	—	—	—	—		Kingdom Book One (Deluxe)
"Sunday Morning" (Lecrae featuring Kirk Franklin)	2020	—	—	— (Note: "Sunday Morning" did not enter the US Billboard Hot Gospel Songs chart, but peaked at number 8 on the US Gospel Digital Song Sales chart.)	—	—	—	—	—	—	—		Restoration
"Again" (with Chandler Moore, Tori Kelly, Jonathan McReynolds & Jekalyn Carr)	2023	—	—	9	23	—	—	—	—	—	—		Father's Day
"Welcome Home"	2023	—	—	17	—	—	—	—	—	—	—		Father's Day
"Show Me the Way" (Mustard featuring Kirk Franklin)	2024	—	—	3	—	—	—	—	—	—	—		Faith of a Mustard Seed
"Rain Down on Me" (GloRilla featuring Kirk Franklin, Maverick City Music, Kierra Sheard and Chandler Moore)	2024	—	—	1	2	—	—	—	—	—	—		Glorious
"Free Me Tonight" (with Jelly Roll)	2026	—	—	9	—	—	—	—	—	—	—		I Am What I Am
"Hope In You" (with Davido)	2026	—	—	6	—	—	—	—	—	—	—		I Am What I Am
"It Gets Better" (with Tobe Nwigwe)	2026	—	—	14	—	—	—	—	—	—	—		I Am What I Am
"Stay"	2026	—	—	23	—	—	—	—	—	—	—		I Am What I Am
"Someday"	2026	—	—	12	—	—	—	—	—	—	—		I Am What I Am
"It Is Well"	2026	—	—	20	—	—	—	—	—	—	—		I Am What I Am
"—" denotes releases that did not chart or were not released in that territory.

== Guest appearances ==
List of non-single guest appearances, with other performing artists, showing year released and album name
Title	Year	Other artist(s)	Album	Ref.
"Joy"	1992	Georgia Mass Choir, Dorothy Anderson	I Sing Because I'm Happy	
"Holy One"	1993	Trinity Temple Full Gospel Mass Choir, Dalon Collins	Holy One	
"Be Alright"	1993	Trinity Temple Full Gospel Mass Choir	Holy One	
"My Life Is in Your Hands"	1996	God's Property	Get on the Bus	
"Hold On"	1997	Salt-N-Pepa, Sounds of Blackness	Brand New	
"Our Take #1 "Holy One Testimony""	1998	—N/a	Gospel Out-Takes: Good Cuts	
"Let My People Go"	1998	—N/a	The Prince of Egypt: Inspirational	
"Joy"	1998	James Cleveland, Jimmy Wyatt	GMWA Live Collectors Edition	
"I Still Believe"	2000	Crystal Lewis	Fearless	
"J Train"	2001	TobyMac	Momentum	
"One of the Ones Who Did"	2003	Brian McKnight	U-Turn	
"J Train" (Math Remix)	2003	Toby Mac	Re:Mix Momentum	
"J Train" (Awlboard Remix)	2003	DJ Maj, Toby Mac	The Ringleader: Mixtape Volume III	
"I'm Ready"	2003	Shirley Caesar	Shirley Caesar and Friends	
"Since Jesus Came"	2003	Tonéx	Out the Box	
"Incredible"	2004	Anthony Evans	Even More	
"How Many Lashes"	2004	Yolanda Adams	The Passion of the Christ: Original Songs Inspired by the Film	
"And I"	2005	Mary Mary	Mary Mary	
"Shelter in the Rain"	2005	Stevie Wonder	A Time 2 Love	
"The B-O-Y-Z Dance"	2006	Veggietales	Boyz in the Sink	
"Belly Button 2006"	2006	Veggietales	Boyz in the Sink	
"Who Am I?"	2007	Da T.R.U.T.H., Tye Tribbett	Da T.R.U.T.H. and Friends Live!	
"I Just Can't Live"	2010	Myron Butler & Levi	Revealed... Live in Dallas	
"Mercies"	2010	Israel Houghton	Love God. Love People.: The London Sessions	
"In Love"	2012	—N/a	Joyful Noise	
"Lose My Soul" (Shoc Remix)	2012	TobyMac	Dubbed and Freq'd: A Remix Project	
"Done for Me"	2012	Amber Bullock	So in Love	
"Made to Worship"	2012	John P. Kee & New Life	Life and Favor	
"So Glad"	2013	Isaac Carree, Kierra Sheard, Lecrae	Reset	
"Intro"	2014	James Fortune & FIYA	Live Through It	
"Beautiful"	2014	The Walls Group	Fast Forward	
"Something About the Name Jesus" (Producer's Remix)	2014	The Rance Allen Group	Celebrate	
"Hallelujah"	2016	Joy Enriquez, Lindsey Stirling	The Call	
"Finish Line/Drown"	2016	Chance The Rapper, T-Pain, Eryn Allen Kane, Noname	Coloring Book	
"Amazing Grace"	2016	Jordan Smith	Something Beautiful	
"We Three Kings"	2017	—N/a	The Star	
"I Love You"	2018	Sarah Reeves	Easy Never Needed You	
"Love Interlude"	2020	Isaac Carree	No Risk No Reward	
"Take Me Back"	2020	Myron Butler, Kelontae Gavin	My Tribute	
"Sunday Morning"	2020	Lecrae	Restoration	
"Gotta Have You"	2020	PJ Morton, Jermaine Dolly, Lena Byrd Miles	Gospel According to PJ: From the Songbook of PJ Morton	
"The Fullest"	2020	Josh Groban	Harmony	
"Can You Feel It" (Remix)	2021	The Jacksons, Tamela Mann	Triumph (Expanded Version)	
"Hello God"	2021	Tamela Mann, Wyclef Jean	Overcomer	
"Mercy"	2023	Trip Lee	The Epilogue	
"Show Me the Way"	2024	Mustard	Faith of a Mustard Seed	
"RAIN DOWN ON ME"	2024	GloRilla, Maverick City Music, Kierra Sheard, Chandler Moore	GLORIOUS	

== Videography ==
=== Video albums ===
List of video albums, with selected chart positions
Title	Album details	Peak chart positions	Certifications
Title	Album details	US Music Videos	Certifications
Live (with The Family)	Released: May 3, 1994; Label: GospoCentric (#72124)	30	RIAA: Gold
Whatcha Lookin' 4 (with The Family)	Released: April 7, 1998; Label: GospoCentric (#70012)	2	
The Nu Nation Tour (featuring The Family, One Nation Crew, Cece Winans, Trin-i-tee 5:7 and Crystal Lewis)	Released: August 24, 1999; Label: GospoCentric (#70013)	6	
The Rebirth of Kirk Franklin	Released: October 8, 2002; Label: GospoCentric (#70037)	3	RIAA: Gold
"—" denotes releases that did not chart or were not released in that territory.

=== Music videos ===
- "Why We Sing"
- "Melodies From Heaven"
- "Stomp" (featuring Cheryl "Salt" James of Salt-N-Pepa)
- "You Are The Only One"
- "Lean On Me"
- "Revolution"
- "Thank You" (with Mary Mary)
- "Nobody"
- "Brighter Day"
- "Looking for You"
- "Imagine Me"
- "September" from Interpretations: The Music of Earth, Wind, & Fire
- "Let It Go"
- "Declaration (This is It)"
- "Are You Listening?"
- "I Smile"
- "Wanna Be Happy?"
- "Love Theory"
- "OK"
- "All Things"
- "Try Love"

List of music videos showing year released and directors
Title	Year	Other artist(s)	Director(s)	Ref.
"Melodies From Heaven"	1995	—N/a	Tim Malone	
"Stomp"	1997	God's Property, Cheryl "Salt" James	Darren Grant	
"Lean on Me"	1998	Mary J. Blige, Bono, Crystal Lewis, R. Kelly	Mark Gerald	
"Wanna Be Happy?"	2015	—N/a	Rock Jacobs	
"OK"	2019	—N/a	Matthew DeLisi	
"Oil and Water"	2021	Travis Greene, John P. Kee	—N/a	
"Fall in Love at Christmas"	2021	Mariah Carey, Khalid	Mariah Carey, Bryan Tanaka	
"Can You Feel It" (Kirk Franklin Remix)	2019	The Jacksons, Tamela Mann	—N/a	
"All Things"	2023	—N/a	West Webb	
"Try Love"	2023	—N/a	Jalen Jet Turner, West Webb	

=== Other video appearances ===
Celebration of Gospel: Taking You Higher (Performer)

- Released: 2007

The Rance Allen Group: The Live Experience (Performer)

- Released: 2004

WOW Gospel 2002: 12 Top Videos (Performer)

- Released: 2002

Journeys in Black: Kirk Franklin (aka BET Journeys in Black: Kirk Franklin; Participant)

- Released: 2001

== Production discography ==
=== Albums ===
List of albums, by other performing artists, produced by Kirk Franklin, showing year released
Title	Album details	Peak chart positions				
Title	Album details	US	US R&B /HH	US Gospel	US OST	UK Christ. & Gospel
Kingdom Come [Original Soundtrack]	Released: April 3, 2001; Artists: Kirk Franklin, Jill Scott, S.O.P., Sopa, Carl Thomas, Natalie Wilson, Shawn Stockman, Mary Mary, Deborah Cox, Trin-i-tee 5:7, Kurt Carr, Tamela Mann, Crystal Lewis, Tamar Braxton, One Nation Crew, Az Yet, Ashley Guilbert, Shanika Leeks, Bishop Kenneth Ulmer, Caltomeesh West	61	18	1	25	—
Hiding Place	Released: September 14, 2018; Artist: Tori Kelly; Co-producers: Max Stark, Ronald Hill, Rickey Offord	35	—	1	—	1

=== Singles ===
List of singles, by other performing artists, produced by Kirk Franklin, showing year released, certifications and album
Title	Year	Peak chart positions				Certifications	Album
Title	Year	US R&B /HH	US Adult R&B	US Gospel	US Christ.	Certifications	Album
"Lean On Me" (Crystal Lewis)	1998	—	—	—	—		Gold
"Take Me to the King" (Tamela Mann featuring Kirk Franklin)	2012	44	9	1	—	RIAA: 2× Platinum	Best Days
"Different" (Tasha Page-Lockhart)	2014	—	—	9	—		Here Right Now
"God Provides" (Tamela Mann)	2016	—	—	2	—		One Way
"King God" (Marvin Sapp)	2019	—	—	—	—		Close
"Fall in Love at Christmas" (with Mariah Carey and Khalid)	2021	— (Note: "Fall in Love at Christmas" did not enter the US Billboard Hot R&B/Hip-Hop Songs chart, but peaked at number 45 on the R&B/Hip-Hop Airplay chart and number 24 on the US Hot R&B Songs chart.)	18	—	—		Non-album single
"—" denotes releases that did not chart or were not released in that territory.

=== Songs ===
List of non-single releases, by other performing artists, produced by Kirk Franklin, showing year released and album name
Title	Year	Co-producer(s)	Artist(s)	Album	Ref.
"God's Blessing"	1998	—N/a	Trin-i-Tee 5:7	Trin-i-tee 5:7	
"I Still Believe"	2000	—N/a	Crystal Lewis	Fearless	
"God's Blessing"	2003	Babyface, Tyrone Thompson	Papa San	God & I	
"Incredible"	2004	—N/a	Anthony Evans	Even More	
"Tonight"	2005	—N/a	Yolanda Adams	Day by Day	
"Show Me"	2005	—N/a	Yolanda Adams	Day by Day	
"A Song About Jesus"	2009	Shaun Martin	Crystal Aikin	Crystal Aikin	
"Here Right Now"	2014	Shaun Martin, Max Stark	Tasha Page-Lockhart	Here Right Now	
"Fragile"	2014	Shaun Martin, Max Stark	Tasha Page-Lockhart	Here Right Now	
"Yours"	2014	Shaun Martin, Max Stark	Tasha Page-Lockhart, PJ Morton	Here Right Now	
"Welcome"	2014	Shaun Martin, Max Stark	Tasha Page-Lockhart	Here Right Now	
"Life"	2014	Shaun Martin, Max Stark	Tasha Page-Lockhart	Here Right Now	
"Fragile (Reprise)"	2014	Shaun Martin, Max Stark	Tasha Page-Lockhart	Here Right Now	
"Hello God"	2021	—N/a	Tamela Mann, Wyclef Jean, Kirk Franklin	Overcomer	
"That Way"	2023	J. White Did It, Ronnie Jackson	Kingdom Business Cast, Serayah	Kingdom Business 2	
"Go Tell It on the Mountain"	2024	Ron Hill, Justin Pearson	Jennifer Hudson	The Gift of Love	

== Other appearances ==
Live in Washington D.C. (Gospel Music Workshop of America Mass Choir album; Director)

- Released: 1991

I Sing Because I'm Happy (Georgia Mass Choir album; Piano, Vocals)

- Released: 1992

Live from Salt Lake City Utah (Gospel Music Workshop of America Mass Choir album; Director)

- Released: 1992

You Can Make It If You Try (Carnell Murrell album; Director)

- Released: 1992

Chief Cornerstone (Gospel Music Workshop of America Men's Choir album; Piano, Leader)

- Released: 1993

Deliverance (Myrna Summers & DFW Choir album; Director)

- Released: 1993

Lost Without You: Soulful Songs for Love and Marriage (Various Artists album; Performer)

- Released: March 22, 1994
- Label: Capitol Records
- Tracks: "Real Love"

R. Kelly (R. Kelly album; Choir Director)

- Released: 1995
- Label: Jive Records

Don't Be a Menace to South Central While Drinking Your Juice in the Hood (Original Soundtrack album; Producer)

- Released: 1996

Greatest Hits (Georgia Mass Choir album; Vocals)

- Released: 1996

WOW 1997: The Year's 30 Top Christian Artists and Songs (Various Artists album; Producer)

- Released: 1996

Christmas Is... (Various Artists album; Performer)

- Released: 1997

Finally Karen (Karen Clark-Sheard album; Critic)

- Released: 1997
- Label: Island Records

Glory of Gospel, Vol. 1: Best of Inspirational Music (Various Artists album;)

- Released: 1997

Live in Indianapolis (Gospel Music Workshop of America Mass Choir album; Director)

- Released: 1994, 1997

Soul Train Christmas Starfest (Various Artists album; Producer)

- Released: 1997

Dancin' in the Spirit, Vol. 2: The Gospel Jam (Various Artists album; Vocals)

- Released: 1998

GMWA Live Collectors Edition (Rev. James Cleveland album; Performer)

- Released: 1998

Gospel Out-Takes: Good Cuts (Various Artists album; Vocals)

- Released: 1998

Living the Dream: A Tribute to Martin Luther King Jr. (Various Artists album; Producer)

- Released: 1998

MTV Jams (Various Artists album; Producer)

- Released: 1998

Spirit of Power: Inspirational Hits of Gospel (Various Artists album; Performer)

- Released: 1998

Trin-I-Tee 5:7 (Trin-i-tee 5:7 album; Producer)

- Released: 1998

Live Praise and Worship from Christ for the Nation (Various Artists album; Soloist)

- Released: 1999

M2K: Music for the Millennium (Various Artists album; Producer)

- Released: 1999

Spiritual Love (Trin-i-tee 5:7 album; Performer)

- Released: 1999

Touched by an Angel: The Christmas Album (Original Television Soundtrack album; Producer)

- Released: 1999

Hallelujah Halloween XXX (Various Artists album; Soloist)

- Released: 2000

His Woman His Wife (Original Soundtrack album; Keyboards, Producer)

- Released: 2000

M2K Gospel 2000 (Various Artists album; Performer)

- Released: 2000

Play It to the Bone (Original Soundtrack album; Producer)

- Released: 2000

Top 20 Gospel, Vol. 3: Gotta Tell the World (Various Artists album; Performer, Soloist)

- Released: 2000

Whatever It Takes (Various Artists album; Background Coordinator)

- Released: 2000

WOW Gold (Various Artists album; Producer)

- Released: 2000

Boycott [HBO Film] (Original Soundtrack album; Performer)

- Released: 2001

Kingdom Come [Original Soundtrack] (Original Soundtrack album; Producer)

- Released: 2001

N.E. X-Perience, Vol. 1 (Gary Mayes/Nu Era album; Inspiration)

- Released: 2002

This Is Gospel: Meditation (Various Artists album; Performer)

- Released: 2002

WOW Christmas [Red] (Various Artists album; Producer)

- Released: 2002

WOW Gospel 2002 (Various Artists album; Producer)

- Released: 2002

God & I (Papa San album; Producer)

- Released: 2003

WOW Gospel 2003 (Various Artists album; Producer)

- Released: 2003

He-Motions (T. D. Jakes album; Script)

- Released: 2004

WOW Gospel 2004 (Various Artists album; Producer)

- Released: 2004

Day by Day (Yolanda Adams album; Producer)

- Released: 2005
- Label: Elektra Records, Atlantic Records

Gospel Legends [DVD] (Various Artists album; Performer)

- Released: 2005

Gospel Legends [Malaco 3 CD] (Various Artists album; Performer, Soloist)

- Released: 2005

The Gospel [Original Soundtrack] (Original Soundtrack album; Producer)

- Released: 2005

The Preacher's Wife: Original Soundtrack Album (Original Soundtrack album; Songwriter)

- Released: 1996
- Label: Arista
- Tracks:
1. 3 "Joy"

Men of Gospo, Vol. 1 (Various Artists album; Producer)

- Released: 2005

Wow #1s: 31 of the Greatest Christian Music Hits Ever (Various Artists album; Producer)

- Released: 2005

Boyz in the Sink (VeggieTales album; Vocals, Performer, Guest Appearance)

- Released: 2006

Dallas Fort Worth Mass Choir [601] (Dallas Fort Worth Mass Choir album; Director)

- Released: 2006

Georgia Mass Choir [DVD] (Georgia Mass Choir album; Performer)

- Released: 2006

Gospo Classics, Vol. 2 (Various Artists album; Producer)

- Released: 2006

Men of Gospo, Vol. 2 (Various Artists album; Producer)

- Released: 2006

Not in My Family: Songs of Healing and Inspiration (Various Artists album; Producer)

- Released: 2006

Soul Togetherness 2006 (Various Artists album; Producer)

- Released: 2006

Collaborations [Circuit City Exclusive] (Jill Scott album; Producer)

- Released: 2007

Essential Donnie (Donnie McClurkin album; Guest Appearance)

- Released: 2007

Interpretations: Celebrating the Music of Earth, Wind & Fire (Various Artists album; Drums, Keyboards, Programming, Producer, Executive Producer)

- Released: 2007

Noel (Josh Groban album; Arranger, Director)

- Released: 2007

Patty Kark Christmas: At the Manger (Patty Kark album; Arranger)

- Released: 2007

Very Best of Praise and Worship, Vol. 2 (Various Artists album; Producer)

- Released: 2007

Wow #1's (Various Artists album; Producer)

- Released: 2007

Faith of a Mustard Seed (Mustard album; Guest Appearance)

- Released: 2024
- Label: 10 Summers and BMG
- Tracks: "Show Me the Way"
