= List of awards and nominations received by Kirk Franklin =

Kirk Franklin
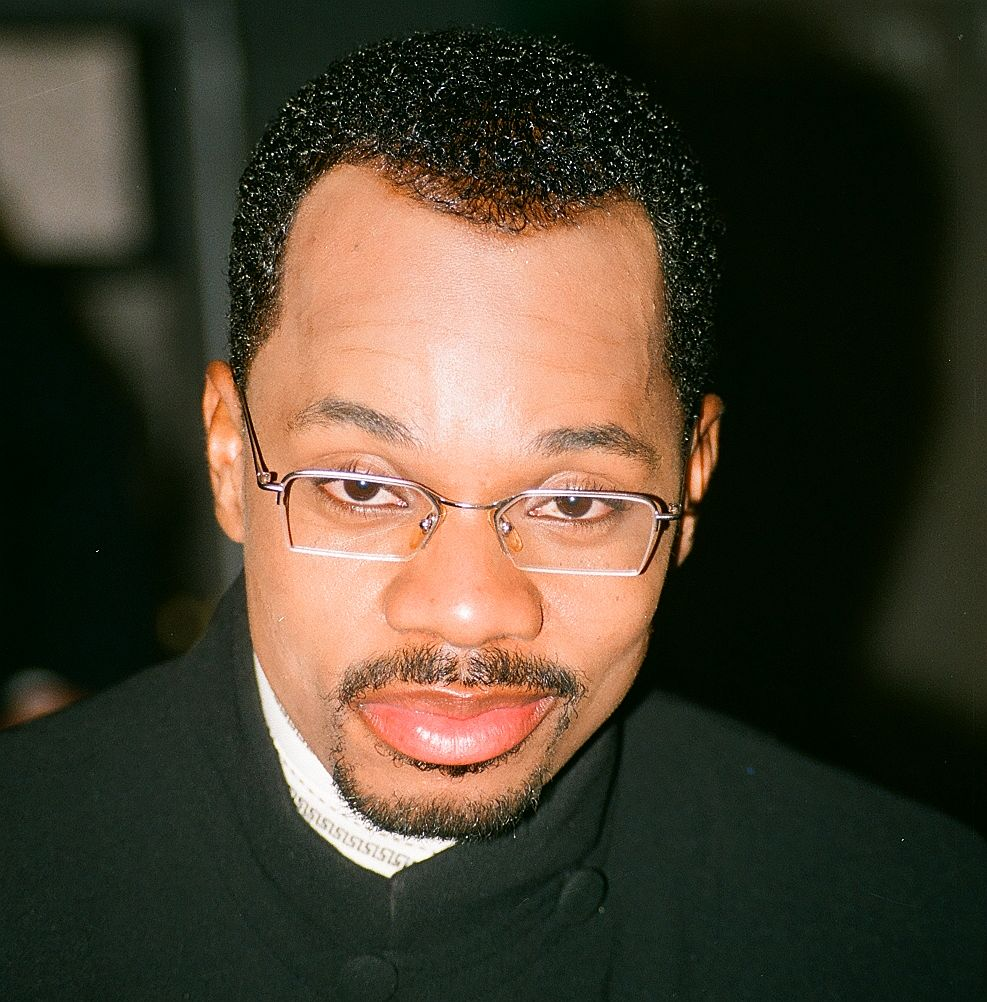
- Franklin in 1998

Background information
- Genres: Urban contemporary gospel, Christian hip hop
- Occupations: Songwriter; record producer; music director; singer
- Years active: 1993–present
- Website: www.kirkfranklin.us

Kirk Franklin is a contemporary gospel singer, author, and leader of urban contemporary choirs such as The Family, Nu Nation, God's Property, and 1NC (One Nation Crew). He has been honored with numerous awards and nominations for his work in music.

== American Music Awards ==
| Year | Category | Result | Ref. |
|---|---|---|---|
| 2006 | Favorite Contemporary Inspirational Artist | Won | |
| 2021 | Favorite Artist - Gospel | Nominated | |

== BET Awards ==
| Year | Nominee / work | Category | Result | Ref. |
|---|---|---|---|---|
| 2026 | "Able" | Dr. Bobby Jones Best Gospel/Inspirational Award | Pending | |
| 2026 | "Do It Again" | Dr. Bobby Jones Best Gospel/Inspirational Award | Pending | |

== Dove Awards ==
The Dove Awards are awarded annually by the Gospel Music Association.

| Year | Category | Nominated work | Result | Ref. |
|---|---|---|---|---|
| 1993 | Traditional Gospel Album of the Year | Kirk Franklin & the Family | Won | |
| 1993 | Traditional Gospel Song of the Year | "Why We Sing" | Won | |
| 1996 | Contemporary Gospel Album of the Year | Whatcha Lookin' 4 | Won | |
| 1997 | Impact Award | Kirk Franklin and the Family | Honored | |
| 1998 | Urban Album of the Year | God's Property | Won | |
| 1998 | Urban Song of the Year | "Stomp" (shared with co-songwriters) | Won | |
| 1999 | Contemporary Gospel Album of the Year | The Nu Nation Project | Won | |
| 2000 | Urban Song of the Year | "Revolution" | Won | |
| 2001 | Urban Gospel Album of the Year | "Kirk Franklin Presents 1NC" | Won | |
| 2001 | Urban Song of the Year | "Nobody" (Kirk Franklin & 1NC) | Nominated | |
| 2002 | Urban Recorded Song of the Year | "Thank You" (with Mary Mary) | Won | |
| 2003 | Contemporary Gospel Album of the Year | The Rebirth of Kirk Franklin | Won | |
| 2006 | Urban Gospel Album of the Year | Hero | Won | |
| 2006 | Urban Song of the Year | "Looking for You" (shared with co-songwriters) | Won | |
| 2007 | Urban Recorded Song of the Year | "Imagine Me" | Won | |
| 2007 | Song of the Year | "Imagine Me" | Nominated | |
| 2009 | Urban Album of the Year | The Fight of My Life | Won | |
| 2009 | Urban Recorded Song of the Year | "Declaration (This Is It)" | Nominated | |
| 2012 | Male Vocalist of the Year | Himself | Nominated | |
| 2012 | Song of the Year | "I Smile" (shared with co-songwriters) | Nominated | |
| 2012 | Contemporary Gospel Recorded Song of the Year | "I Smile" (shared with co-songwriters) | Won | |
| 2012 | Contemporary Gospel Album of the Year | Hello Fear | Won | |
| 2014 | Traditional Gospel Recorded Song of the Year | "Take Me To the King" (shared with Tamela Mann, performer) | Won | |
| 2016 | Contemporary Gospel/Urban Album of the Year | Losing My Religion | Won | |
| 2016 | Gospel Artist of the Year | Himself | Won | |
| 2017 | Contemporary Gospel/Urban Recorded Song of the Year | "My World Needs You" | Won | |
| 2019 | Contemporary Gospel Recorded Song of the Year | "Love Theory" | Won | |
| 2019 | Gospel Artist of the Year | Himself | Won | |
| 2020 | Gospel Artist of the Year | Himself | Nominated | |
| 2020 | Song of the Year | "Love Theory" | Nominated | |
| 2020 | Songwriter of the Year (Artist) | Himself | Nominated | |
| 2020 | Contemporary Gospel Album of the Year | Long Live Love | Won | |
| 2021 | Song of the Year | "Together" | Nominated | |
| 2021 | Songwriter of the Year | Himself | Nominated | |
| 2021 | Gospel Artist of the Year | Himself | Nominated | |
| 2021 | Pop/Contemporary Recorded Song of the Year | "Together" (with For King & Country and Tori Kelly) | Nominated | |

== Grammy Awards ==
The Grammy Awards are awarded annually by the National Academy of Recording Arts and Sciences (NARAS).

| Year | Nominee / work | Award | Result | Ref. |
|---|---|---|---|---|
| 1997 | Whatcha Lookin' 4 (Kirk Franklin & The Family) | Best Contemporary Soul Gospel Album | Won | |
| 1998 | God's Property | Best Gospel Choir or Chorus Album | Won | |
| 1998 | "Stomp" | Best R&B Performance by a Duo or Group with Vocals | Nominated | |
| 1998 | "Stomp" | Best R&B Song | Nominated | |
| 1998 | Himself | Producer of the Year, Non-Classical | Nominated | |
| 1999 | The Nu Nation Project | Best Contemporary Soul Gospel Album | Won | |
| 1999 | "Lean on Me" | Song of the Year | Nominated | |
| 1999 | "Lean on Me" | Best R&B Song | Nominated | |
| 1999 | "Lean on Me" | Best R&B Performance by a Duo or Group with Vocals | Nominated | |
| 2006 | "Looking For You" | Best Gospel Performance | Nominated | |
| 2007 | "Imagine Me" | Best Gospel Song | Won | |
| 2007 | Hero | Best Contemporary R&B Gospel Album | Won | |
| 2009 | The Fight of My Life | Best Contemporary R&B Gospel Album | Won | |
| 2009 | "Help Me Believe" | Best Gospel Song | Won | |
| 2012 | "Hello Fear" | Best Gospel Song | Won | |
| 2012 | Hello Fear | Best Gospel Album | Won | |
| 2015 | "Love on the Radio" | Best Gospel Performance/Song | Nominated | |
| 2016 | "Wanna Be Happy?" | Best Gospel Performance/Song | Won | |
| 2017 | "God Provides" | Best Gospel Performance/Song | Won | |
| 2017 | "Ultralight Beam" (with Kanye West, Chance the Rapper, The-Dream and Kelly Price) | Best Rap Song | Nominated | |
| 2017 | "Ultralight Beam" (with Kanye West, Chance the Rapper, The-Dream and Kelly Price) | Best Rap/Sung Performance | Nominated | |
| 2017 | Losing My Religion | Best Gospel Album | Won | |
| 2019 | "Hiding Place" | Best Gospel Album | Won | |
| 2019 | "Never Alone" (shared with Tori Kelly) | Best Gospel Performance/Song | Won | |
| 2020 | "Long Live Love" | Best Gospel Album | Won | |
| 2020 | "Love Theory" | Best Gospel Performance/Song | Won | |
| 2023 | "Kingdom" (with Maverick City Music) | Best Gospel Performance/Song | Won | |
| 2023 | "Fear Is Not My Future" (with Maverick City Music) | Best Contemporary Christian Music Performance/Song | Won | |
| 2023 | Kingdom Book One (with Maverick City Music) | Best Gospel Album | Won | |
| 2024 | "All Things" | Best Gospel Performance/Song | Won | |
| 2026 | "Do It Again" | Best Gospel Performance/Song | Nominated | |

== NAACP Image Awards ==
| Year | Category | Nominated work | Result | Ref. |
|---|---|---|---|---|
| 1996 | Outstanding Gospel Artist | Kirk Franklin and the Family | Won | |
| 1996 | Outstanding New Artist | Kirk Franklin and the Family | Nominated | |
| 1996 | Outstanding Duo or Group | Kirk Franklin and the Family | Nominated | |
| 1997 | Outstanding Duo or Group | Kirk Franklin and the Family | Won | |
| 1997 | Outstanding Gospel Artist | Kirk Franklin and the Family | Nominated | |
| 1998 | Outstanding Song | "Stomp" (with God's Property and Cheryl James) | Nominated | |
| 1999 | Outstanding Song | "Lean on Me" | Won | |
| 1999 | Outstanding Album | The Nu Nation Project | Nominated | |
| 1999 | Outstanding Male Artist | Himself | Nominated | |
| 1999 | Outstanding Gospel Artist | Kirk Franklin and the Family | Won | |
| 2001 | Outstanding Duo or Group | Kirk Franklin and the Family | Nominated | |
| 2002 | Outstanding Duo or Group | Kirk Franklin and Jill Scott | Nominated | |
| 2003 | Outstanding Album | The Rebirth of Kirk Franklin | Won | |
| 2003 | Outstanding Song | "Brighter Day" | Won | |
| 2003 | Outstanding Gospel Artist (Traditional or Contemporary) | Himself | Won | |
| 2003 | Outstanding Gospel Artist | Himself | Won | |
| 2006 | Outstanding Gospel Artist | Himself | Nominated | |
| 2007 | Outstanding Gospel Artist | Himself | Won | |
| 2008 | Outstanding Gospel Artist | Himself | Won | |
| 2011 | Outstanding Literary Work – Instructional | The Blueprint: A Plan for Living Above Life's Storms | Nominated | |
| 2012 | Outstanding Song | "I Smile" | Won | |
| 2016 | Outstanding Gospel Album – Traditional or Contemporary | Losing My Religion | Nominated | |
| 2019 | Outstanding Song | "Never Alone" (with Tori Kelly) | Nominated | |
| 2020 | Outstanding Gospel/Christian Song – Traditional or Contemporary | Love Theory | Won | |
| 2021 | Outstanding Gospel/Christian Song | "Strong God" | Nominated | |
| 2022 | Outstanding Gospel/Christian Song | "Overcome 2021" | Nominated | |
| 2023 | Outstanding Gospel/Christian Album | Kingdom Book One (with Maverick City Music) | Won | |
| 2024 | Outstanding Gospel/Christian Album | Father's Day | Won | |
| 2024 | Outstanding Gospel/Christian Song | "All Things" | Nominated | |
| 2025 | Outstanding Duo or Group (Contemporary) | "Rain Down On Me" (with GloRilla and Maverick City Music) | Nominated | |
| 2026 | Outstanding Gospel/Christian Song | "Do It Again" | Won | |

== Stellar Awards ==
| Year | Category | Nominated work | Result | Ref. |
|---|---|---|---|---|
| 2000 | Artist of the Year | Himself | Won | |
| 2000 | Song of the Year | "Lean On Me" | Won | |
| 2000 | Producer of the Year | The Nu Nation Project | Won | |
| 2000 | CD of the Year | The Nu Nation Project | Won | |
| 2000 | Contemporary CD of the Year | The Nu Nation Project | Won | |
| 2000 | Contemporary Choir of the Year | The Nu Nation Project | Won | |
| 2000 | Rap Hip-Hop Gospel CD of the Year | The Nu Nation Project | Won | |
| 2000 | Music Video of the Year | "Lean On Me" | Won | |
| 2000 | Urban/Inspirational Performance of the Year | "Thank You" (with Mary Mary) | Won | |
| 2002 | Rap/Hip Hop Gospel CD of the Year | Kingdom Come Soundtrack | Won | |
| 2002 | Producer of the Year | Kingdom Come Soundtrack | Nominated | |
| 2002 | Urban/Inspirational Performance of the Year | Kingdom Come Soundtrack (with Mary Mary) | Won | |
| 2002 | Music Video of the Year | "Thank You" (with Mary Mary) | Nominated | |
| 2003 | Artist of the Year | The Rebirth of Kirk Franklin | Won | |
| 2003 | Producer of the Year | The Rebirth of Kirk Franklin | Won | |
| 2003 | CD of the Year | The Rebirth of Kirk Franklin | Won | |
| 2003 | Song of the Year | "Hosanna" | Won | |
| 2003 | Music Video of the Year | "Hosanna" | Won | |
| 2007 | CD of the Year | Hero | Won | |
| 2007 | Artist of the Year | Hero | Nominated | |
| 2007 | Producer of the Year | Hero | Nominated | |
| 2007 | Contemporary CD of the Year | Hero | Nominated | |
| 2007 | Song of the Year | "Looking For You" | Nominated | |
| 2007 | Music Video of the Year | "Looking For You" | Nominated | |
| 2008 | Artist of the Year | The Fight of My Life | Nominated | |
| 2008 | CD of the Year | The Fight of My Life | Nominated | |
| 2008 | Producer of the Year | The Fight of My Life | Nominated | |
| 2008 | Urban/ Inspirational Single / Performance of the Year | "Declaration: (This Is It)" | Won | |
| 2008 | Music Video of the Year | "Declaration: (This Is It)" | Nominated | |
| 2011 | Special Event CD of the Year | Are You Listening | Nominated | |
| 2012 | Artist of the Year | Hello Fear | Nominated | |
| 2012 | CD of the Year | Hello Fear | Won | |
| 2012 | Producer of the Year | Hello Fear | Won | |
| 2012 | Contemporary CD of the Year | Hello Fear | Won | |
| 2012 | Song of the Year | "I Smile" | Won | |
| 2012 | Urban/ Inspirational Single / Performance of the Year | "I Smile" | Nominated | |
| 2014 | Song of the Year | "Take Me To the King" | Won | |
| 2014 | Producer of the Year | Best Days | Nominated | |

== Urban Music Awards ==
| Year | Category | Result | Ref. |
|---|---|---|---|
| 2009 | Best Gospel Act | Won | |

== Soul Train Awards ==
| Year | Category | Result | Ref. |
|---|---|---|---|
| 1994 | Best Gospel Album | Kirk Franklin & the Family | Nominated |
| 1996 | Best Gospel Album | Kirk Franklin & the Family Christmas | Nominated |
| 1997 | Best Gospel Album | Whatcha Lookin' 4 | Won |
| 1998 | Best R&B/Soul Album – Group, Band or Duo | God's Property from Kirk Franklin's Nu Nation (with God's Property) | Nominated |
| 1998 | Best Gospel Album | God's Property from Kirk Franklin's Nu Nation (with God's Property) | Won |
| 1999 | Best Gospel Album | The Nu Nation Project | Won |
| 2003 | Best Gospel Album | The Rebirth of Kirk Franklin | Won |
| 2006 | Best Gospel Album | Hero | Nominated |
| 2007 | Best Gospel Album | Songs from the Storm, Volume I | Won |
| 2011 | Best Gospel Performance | "I Smile" | Nominated |
| 2015 | Best Gospel/Inspirational Song | "Wanna Be Happy?" | Nominated |
| 2016 | Best Gospel/Inspirational Song | "123 Victory" | Won |
| 2017 | Best Gospel/Inspirational Award | Himself | Nominated |
| 2018 | Best Gospel/Inspirational Award | Himself | Nominated |
| 2019 | Best Gospel/Inspirational Award | Himself | Won |
| 2020 | Best Gospel/Inspirational Award | Himself | Won |
| 2021 | Best Gospel/Inspirational Award | Himself | Won |
| 2022 | Best Gospel/Inspirational Award | Maverick City Music x Kirk Franklin | Won |
| 2023 | Best Gospel/Inspirational Award | "All Things" | Won |
| 2023 | Best Gospel/Inspirational Award | "Try Love" | Nominated |

== Miscellaneous honors ==
| Year | Organization | Award | Nominated work | Result |
|---|---|---|---|---|
| 2021 | Black Music & Entertainment Walk of Fame | | Himself | Inducted |
| 2025 | Missouri Gospel Music Hall of Fame | | Himself | Inducted |
