= 1998 Soul Train Music Awards =

Music awards ceremony in Los Angeles, US

Soul Train Music Awards
- Date: February 27, 1998
- Location: Shrine Auditorium, Los Angeles, California
- Country: United States
- Hosted by: Patti LaBelle, Heavy D and Erykah Badu
- First award: 1987

Highlights
- Most awards: Erykah Badu (4)
- Website: soultrain.com

Television/radio coverage
- Network: WGN America

The 1998 Soul Train Music Awards were held on February 27, 1998, at the Shrine Auditorium in Los Angeles, California. Puff Daddy was the top nominee with five nominations, other top nominees included Janet Jackson, Aaliyah and Maxwell. The show was hosted by Patti LaBelle, Erykah Badu and Heavy D.

== Special awards ==
=== Quincy Jones Award for Outstanding Career Achievements ===
- Whitney Houston

=== Sammy Davis Jr. Award for Entertainer of the Year ===
- Puff Daddy

== Winners and nominees ==
Winners are in bold text.

=== R&B/Soul or Rap Album of the Year ===
- **Erykah Badu – Baduizm**
  - Mary J. Blige – Share My World
  - The Notorious B.I.G. – Life After Death
  - Puff Daddy & the Family – No Way Out

=== Best R&B/Soul Album – Male ===
- **Joe – All That I Am**
  - Usher - My Way
  - Maxwell – MTV Unplugged
  - Prince – Emancipation

=== Best R&B/Soul Album – Female ===
- **Erykah Badu – Baduizm**
  - Mary J. Blige – Share My World
  - Janet Jackson – The Velvet Rope
  - Mariah Carey – Butterfly

=== Best R&B/Soul Album – Group, Band or Duo ===
- **Dru Hill – Dru Hill**
  - Boyz II Men – Evolution
  - Kirk Franklin and God's Property – God's Property from Kirk Franklin's Nu Nation
  - Ol' Skool – Ol' Skool

=== Best R&B/Soul Single – Male ===
- **Usher – "You Make Me Wanna..."**
  - Joe – "Don't Wanna Be a Player"
  - R.Kelly – "I Believe I Can Fly"
  - Kenny Lattimore – "For You"

=== Best R&B/Soul Single – Female ===
- **Erykah Badu – "On and On"**
  - Aaliyah – "One in a Million"
  - Mary J. Blige – "Everything"
  - Monica – "For You I Will"

=== Best R&B/Soul Single – Group, Band or Duo ===
- **Dru Hill – "In My Bed"**
  - God's Property and Kirk Franklin – "Stomp"
  - LSG - "My Body"
  - Puff Daddy and Faith Evans (featuring 112) - “I'll Be Missing You”

=== The Michael Jackson Award for Best R&B/Soul or Rap Music Video ===
- **Puff Daddy and Faith Evans (featuring 112) - “I'll Be Missing You”**
  - Busta Rhymes – "Put Your Hands Where My Eyes Can See"
  - Missy Elliott – "The Rain (Supa Dupa Fly)"
  - Ice Cube - "The World Is Mine"

=== Best R&B/Soul or Rap New Artist ===
- **Erykah Badu**
  - Missy Elliott
  - God's Property
  - Puff Daddy & The Family

=== Best Gospel Album ===
- **Kirk Franklin and God's Property – God's Property from Kirk Franklin's Nu Nation**
  - The Canton Spirituals – Living the Dream: Live from Washington, D.C.
  - GMWA Gospel Announcers Guild – So You Would Know
  - The Williams Brothers – Still Standing

=== Best Jazz Album ===
- **Boney James – Sweet Thing**
  - Zachary Breaux – Uptown Groove
  - Dave Grusin – Dave Grusin Presents West Side Story
  - The Rippingtons – Black Diamond

== Performers ==
- Janet Jackson – "I Get Lonely"
- Boyz II Men – "Doin' Just Fine"
- Puff Daddy, The LOX and Lil' Kim – "It's All About the Benjamins"
- Heavy D – "I'll Do Anything"
- God's Property and Kirk Franklin – "Stomp"
- Whitney Houston Tribute:
  - Ronald Isley – "Exhale (Shoop Shoop)"
  - Terry Ellis – "How Will I Know"
  - Kenny Lattimore – "I Believe in You and Me"
  - Monica – "You Give Good Love"
- Erykah Badu – "Certainly"
- Usher – "You Make Me Wanna..." and "Nice & Slow"
- Patti LaBelle – "If Only You Knew"
- Dru Hill and Jermaine Dupri – "In My Bed"

== Presenters ==
- Busta Rhymes and Immature - Presented Best R&B Soul/Rap New Artist
- Quincy Jones - Presented Sammy Davis Jr. Awards For Entertainer of the Year
- Garcelle Beauvais, Mystro Clark, and Maxwell - Presented Best R&B Soul Single Male
- Ice Cube, Joe, and Destiny's Child - Presented Best R&B Soul Single Female
- Magic Johnson, Johnnie Cochran, and Jagged Edge - Presented Best R&B Soul Album Group, Band, or Duo
- Nia Long, Rome, and Ol' Skool - Presented Best Gospel Album
- BeBe Winans, Savion Glover, and Mary J. Blige - Presented Michael Jackson Award For Best R&B Soul/Rap Music Video
- Rachel Stuart and Next - Presented Best Jazz Album
- Whoopi Goldberg - Presented Quincy Jones For Outstanding Career Achievements
- Sinbad, Traci Bingham, Eric Benet, and Queen Pen - Presented Best R&B Soul/Rap Album of the Year
- Keith Sweat, Chico DeBarge, Aaliyah, and 112 - Presented Best R&B Soul Single Group, Band, or Duo
- Teddy Riley, Chris Tucker, and Missy Elliott - Presented Best R&B Soul Album Male
- Malcolm-Jamal Warner, Queen Latifah, Xscape, and Ginuwine - Presented Best R&B Soul Album Female
