= Kirk Franklin =

American gospel musician (born 1970)

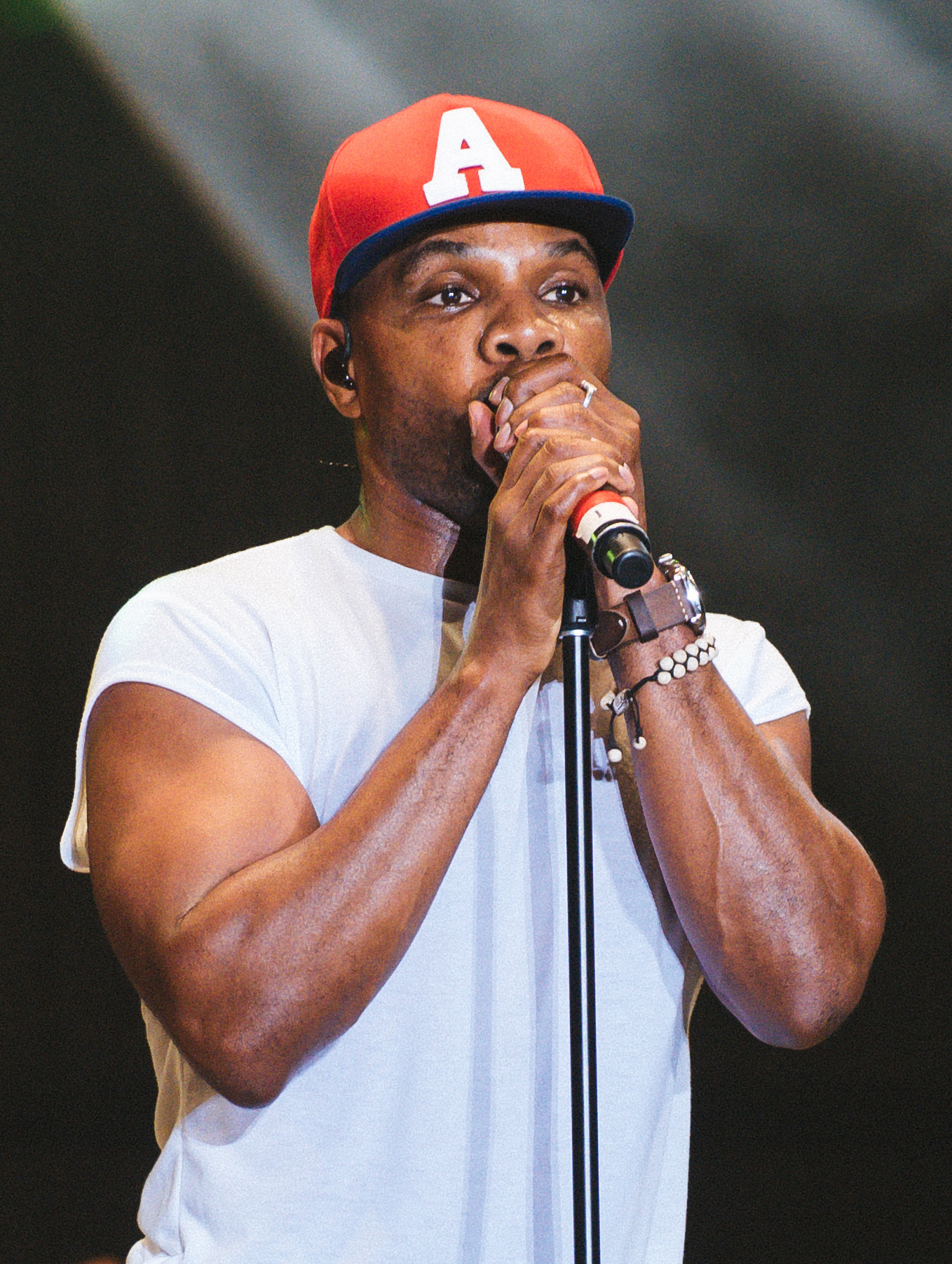
- Franklin in 2017
- Born: Kirk Dewayne Smith; January 26, 1970 (age 56); Fort Worth, Texas, U.S.
- Education: O. D. Wyatt High School
- Occupations: Singer-songwriter; rapper; record producer; choir director; actor
- Years active: 1991–present
- Spouse: Tammy Collins (m. 1996)
- Children: 4
- Awards: Full list
- Musical career
- Genres: Contemporary gospel; soul; Christian hip-hop
- Instruments: Vocals; piano
- Works: Kirk Franklin discography
- Labels: Tribl; Uptown; Provident; RCA Inspiration; Fo Yo Soul; Zomba; RCA; Verity Gospel Music; B-Rite; GospoCentric; Jive; Sparrow; Interscope
- Formerly of: God's Property; 1NC
- Website: kirkfranklin.com

Kirk Dewayne Franklin (born January 26, 1970) is an American gospel singer-songwriter, rapper, record producer, choir director, and actor. Franklin's accolades include 20 Grammy Awards, and Variety has called him a "Reigning King of Urban Gospel", with Franklin being one of the inaugural inductees into the Black Music & Entertainment Walk of Fame. In his earlier career, his act included choirs such as the Family, God's Property, and One Nation Crew (1NC).

== Early life ==
A native of Fort Worth, Texas, Franklin was raised by his aunt, Gertrude, having been abandoned as a baby by his mother. Gertrude recycled aluminum cans to raise money for Kirk to take piano lessons from the age of 4. Kirk excelled and was able to read and write music while also playing by ear.

At the age of seven, Franklin received his first contract, which his aunt turned down. He did join the church choir and became music director of the Mt. Rose Baptist Church adult choir at 11 years of age.

In his teenage years, Franklin rebelled against his strict religious upbringing, and in an attempt to keep him out of trouble, his grandmother arranged an audition for him at a professional youth conservatory associated with a local university. He was accepted, but later he had to deal with a girlfriend's pregnancy and his eventual expulsion from school for bad behavior.

Franklin studied music with Jewell Kelly and the Singing Chaparrals at Oscar Dean Wyatt High School. He continued under her tutelage and ultimately became the pianist for the choir.

When he was aged 15, he witnessed the death of a friend by shooting, after which Franklin returned to the church, where he again directed the choir.

== Career ==
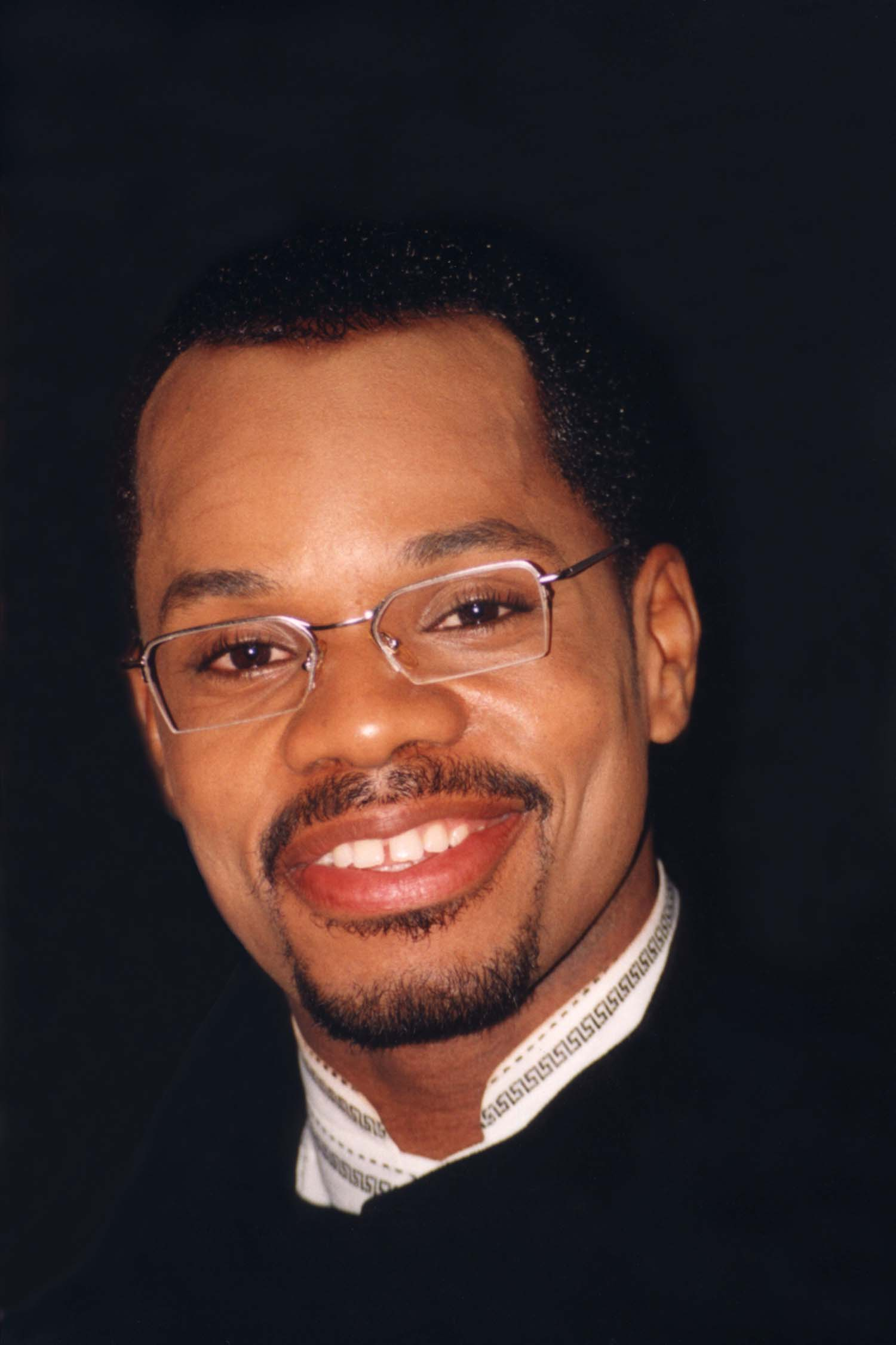
Franklin in 1998

After Kirk Franklin co-founded a gospel group, The Humble Hearts; it was in 1990, when one of the compositions done under Kirk Franklin, had received attention of gospel music figure Milton Biggham, who was choir director of the Georgia Mass Choir. Biggham expressed his impressment, which led to Kirk Franklin leading the DFW Mass Choir in a recording of Franklin's song "Every Day with Jesus". This also led to Biggham hiring Franklin, just 20 years old at the time, to lead the choir at the 1990 Gospel Music Workshop of America Convention, an industry gathering, and eventually an "established" career in 1991.

=== Signing to record label ===
In 1992, while still working with established choirs, Franklin sought to establish "The Family", which featured 15 to 17 in the choir, who were neighborhood friends and associates. The same year, Vicki Mack-Lataillade, the co-founder of GospoCentric Records label, heard one of their demo tapes and was so impressed she immediately signed the choir onto the label.

In 1993, the choir, billed as "Kirk Franklin & The Family", had their debut album, Kirk Franklin & The Family, to be released. It spent almost two years on the gospel music charts and charted on the R&B charts, eventually earning platinum sales status. It remained at No. 1 on the Billboard Top Gospel Albums chart for 42 weeks. It was only the third gospel music album to sell over a million units after Aretha Franklin's Amazing Grace and BeBe & CeCe Winans' Addictive Love.

In May 1994, new material was recorded "live". Nearly two full years later, after the release of a 1995 Christmas album entitled Kirk Franklin & the Family Christmas in late 1995, the delayed Whatcha Lookin' 4 was released in April 1996, with notable studio edits and few-added studio tracks. The album was certified platinum and earned Franklin his first Grammy Award for Best Contemporary Soul Gospel Album.

In 1996, Franklin's song "Joy" was recorded by Whitney Houston and the Georgia Mass Choir. With production by Houston and Mervyn Warren, the composition was included on one of the best-selling gospel album of all time, soundtrack to The Preacher's Wife.

Also in 1996, GospoCentric had established its sublabel B'Rite, in partnership with Interscope Records. It was in 1997, when the collaboration with the choir God's Property, aptly named God's Property from Kirk Franklin's Nu Nation, was released. The lead single, "Stomp", appeared in its "Original Mix", alongside its widespread "remix", in which the latter of the two featured Cheryl "Salt" James (of Salt-N-Pepa). The remix was considered a crossover hit, enjoying heavy rotation on MTV and other music channels and charting at No. 1 on the R&B Singles Airplay chart for two weeks, even making it into the Top 40. God's Property from Kirk Franklin's Nu Nation was No. 1 on the R&B/Hip-Hop Albums chart for five weeks, No. 3 on the Billboard 200, and went on to be certified 3× platinum by the RIAA. It also brought Franklin another Grammy for Best Contemporary Soul Gospel Album, as well as three Grammy nominations.

The Nu Nation Project was released in 1998. The first single, "Lean on Me", produced by Franklin and pop producer Dan Shea, featured the mainstream artists, R. Kelly, Mary J. Blige and Bono of U2, with Contemporary Chrstian singer Crystal Lewis and The Family. "Lean on Me" and the second single "Revolution" (featuring Rodney Jerkins) were considerable hits, and the album contained a version of the Bill Withers song "Gonna Be a Lovely Day". The Nu Nation Project went on to top the Billboard Contemporary Christian Albums chart for 23 weeks and the Billboard Gospel Albums chart for 49 weeks and brought Franklin his third Grammy.

Also in 1998, Franklin had made a guest appearance on the hit television sitcom Sister, Sister.

On November 2, 1998, God's Property sued Franklin. The lawsuit, filed in Los Angeles Superior Court, alleges that Franklin induced God's Property founder Linda Searight into signing an "onerous and one-sided" contract with B-Rite Music.

In 1999, Franklin disbanded the Family, after the acclaimed The Nu Nation Tour. He would shortly record, Kirk Franklin presents 1NC, later on in 1999, which would be released in August 2000. The titular ensemble, is the One Nation Crew, in the form of acronym.

In May 2000, a select amount of the singers of The Family filed a multimillion-dollar lawsuit for their work on The Nu Nation Project against Franklin and GospoCentric Records, in connection to royalties and for "unbalanced" treatment during the success and mainstream attention that God's Property received.

In 2001, the soundtrack Kingdom Come was released after periods of production. The soundtrack featured 1NC, with collaboration with gospel artists Mary Mary, Trin-i-tee 5:7, Crystal Lewis, Kurt Carr, alongside others, and as artists outside of primarily Gospel music, being Az Yet, Jill Scott, Tamar Braxton, Shawn Stockman of Boyz II Men and others.

On January 16, 2010, at the 25th Annual Stellar Awards show taping in Nashville, Tennessee, certain members of The Family and God's Property reunited briefly on stage to perform songs made popular by them in the 1990s. More available members of The Family and God's Property, would reunite in 2023 for The Reunion Tour, which also featured The Clark Sisters, Tye Tribbett, and Israel Houghton. The two choirs would also record a video for Silver and Gold during that same time of The Reunion Tour.

=== Solo artist (2000–present) ===
In June 2000, a live recording of new material was done at Lakewood Church, and after over a year of production, The Rebirth of Kirk Franklin was released in February 2002. It topped the Gospel Albums chart for 29 weeks, was No. 1 on the Hot R&B/Hip-Hop Albums chart and was certified Platinum. The album featured collaborations with Bishop T.D. Jakes, Shirley Caesar, Willie Neal Johnson, TobyMac, Crystal Lewis, Jaci Velasquez, Papa San, Alvin Slaughter, and Yolanda Adams. One Nation Crew sung on the record, however, with several additional background vocals in addition, which formed the billed "Vocals of Life."

In 2004, while GospoCentric had been purchased under Zomba Label, Kirk Franklin launched the new recording label, called Fo Yo Soul Entertainment, in partnership with the two labels.

On October 4, 2005, Hero was released in the United States. The album was certified Gold on December 2, 2005, and Platinum on December 14, 2006, by the Recording Industry Association of America. It reached No. 1 on both the Billboard Top Christian and Top Gospel albums. The first single, "Looking for You", was a hit, as was the follow-up "Imagine Me", which made it onto the R&B charts. At the 2007 Grammy Awards, Franklin won two Grammys for Hero. Additionally, Hero was the 2007 Stellar Awards CD of the Year. In 2005, Franklin appeared with his wife on The Oprah Winfrey Show to discuss how he ended his pornography addiction. In 2010,

Franklin's 10th album, The Fight Of My Life, was released in the United States on December 18, 2007. The album debuted on the Billboard 200 at No. 33 with 74,000 copies sold in the first week. It reached No. 1 on both the Billboard Top Gospel and Top Christian albums charts, and also peaked at No. 7 on the Billboard Top R&B/Hip-Hop Albums Chart. The first single, "Declaration (This is It)", was released on October 23, 2007, and peaked at No. 35 on the Billboard Hot R&B/Hip-Hop Songs Chart. The album features guest appearances from Rance Allen, Isaac Carree, TobyMac, Da' T.R.U.T.H., Doug Williams (singer) and Melvin Williams (singer). The song "Jesus" was released as the album's second single in 2008 and was sent to Urban AC radio on July 15, 2008.

In January 2010, after Haiti had an earthquake, Franklin got an ensemble of gospel artists together to sing the song he wrote, called "Are You Listening". They included Yolanda Adams, Jeremy Camp, Shirley Caesar, Dorinda Clark-Cole, Natalie Grant, Fred Hammond, Tamela Mann, David Mann, Mary Mary, Donnie McClurkin, Bishop Paul S. Morton, J. Moss, Smokie Norful, Marvin Sapp, Karen Clark-Sheard, Kierra Sheard, BeBe Winans, CeCe Winans, and Marvin Winans.. The song was released as a single, when Zomba Gospel was renamed Verity Gospel Music Group, named after the then-"relevant" Verity Records. The same year, Kirk Franklin commenced the publishing of The Blueprint: A Plan for Living Above Life's Storms, a book in which he recounts the family difficulties experienced during his childhood, and how he got out of a sexually active life and an addiction to pornography. Verity Gospel also released the 11th release of Kirk Franklin titled Hello Fear, which was a studio-live hybrid record released on March 22, 2011. The album featured Beverly Crawford, Marvin Sapp, Mali Music, Marvin Winans, John P. Kee, and Rance Allen. The first single, "I Smile," peaked at No. 85 on the Billboard Hot 100, making it his first appearance on that chart in 6 years.

Franklin served as the host and co-executive producer of the BET original series Sunday Best and the musical co-host of GSN's The American Bible Challenge with Jeff Foxworthy. The opportunity of being host of Sunday Best, had been intertwined with Kirk Franklin beginning signing artists onto his label, Fo Yo Soul Recordings, and he had signed notable acts including The Walls Group and artists including Tasha Page-Lockhart. These two, had received 10 Stellar Award nominations at the 30th Stellar Awards. The Walls Group won seven awards, while Page-Lockhart won three of her own, and Franklin won two more for his label.

In September 2015, Franklin announced his 12th studio album, Losing My Religion, which was released on November 13, 2015. The first single off the album, "Wanna Be Happy?", was released on August 28, 2015. It was at this point that Vinson Cunningham referred to him as a hype man when writing for The New Yorker.

Franklin contributed to Tori Kelly's Hiding Place album, released on September 14, 2018. They had intended to collaborate on one song, but it eventually resulted into a larger project.

On January 25, 2019, the single "Love Theory" and official music video for the song was released. "Love Theory" served as the first single from his 13th studio album, Long Live Love. Franklin released his second single, "Just for Me", in April 2019. His third single, "OK," was released in May 2019. Long Live Love was released on May 31.

In February 2019, it was announced that BET's gospel music reality competition, Sunday Best would return from a four-year hiatus, with Franklin reprising his role as host.

After Trinity Broadcasting Network aired the 2019 GMA Dove Awards on October 20, 2019, Franklin commented that his acceptance speech was edited to remove comments he made in relation to the killing of Atatiana Jefferson by a police officer. He stated that he was boycotting the award show going forward as it was not the first time they had edited his acceptance speech to remove "reflections on police violence against Black Americans". GMA president, Jackie Patillo, apologized to Franklin and GMA made an unedited version of the speech available but stated that it was an unintentional action and that they were attempting to reduce the running time to meet a two-hour time-slot. Several other artists supported Franklin's boycott.

In 2021, he was among the inaugural inductees into the Black Music & Entertainment Walk of Fame.

On May 21, 2021, Franklin and American rapper Lil Baby released the song "We Win" for the soundtrack to the 2021 film Space Jam: A New Legacy.

On October 14, 2023, Franklin released his 13th studio album, Father's Day.

In 2024, Franklin was a headline act in the Fun in the Son festival held in Jamaica.

On December 6, 2025, Franklin had new live recording for his upcoming release. On December 17 of the same year, it was announced that he was to receive the Black Music Icon award at the fourth annual Recording Academy Honours on January 29, 2026, presented by The Recording Academy's Black Collective, the event taking place during the week of 68th Annual Grammy Awards.

On October 30, 2026, Franklin released his 14th studio album, I Am What I Am.

== Personal life ==
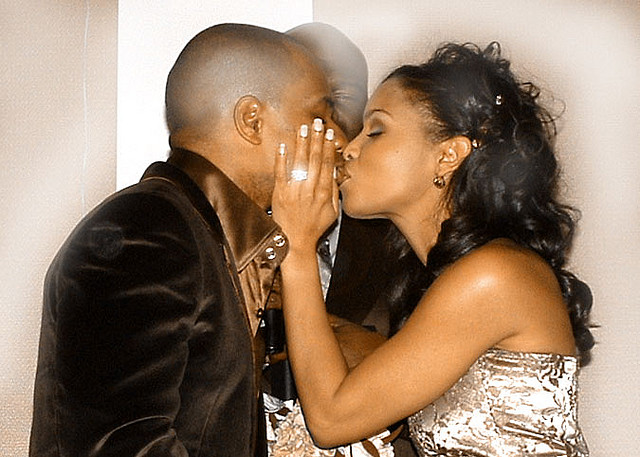
Franklin with his wife in 2006

On January 20, 1996, Franklin married long-time friend Tammy Collins. When they wed, they each had one child from previous relationships. As a couple, they have two children together.

In November 1996, Franklin had a near-death experience after accidentally falling from a stage into an orchestra pit during a concert in Memphis, he suffered a head injury that left him in critical condition; he eventually made a full recovery.

In March 2021, Franklin's oldest son, Kerrion, released an audio recording of a private conversation between him and his father in which both can be heard using profanities. Franklin subsequently said he and Kerrion had a strained relationship and were attending therapy together, and apologized for the heated conversation.

In 2023, Franklin met his biological father Richard Hubbard for the first time and reconciled with his son Kerrion in his documentary film Father's Day: A Kirk Franklin Story.

Franklin has openly discussed how his faith axed his former pornography addiction, which began when he was eight years old and continued for more than a decade.

== Discography ==
=== Kirk Franklin & The Family ===
- Kirk Franklin and the Family (1993)
- Kirk Franklin & the Family Christmas (1995)
- Whatcha Lookin' 4 (1996)

=== Kirk Franklin's Nu Nation ===
- God's Property from Kirk Franklin's Nu Nation (1997)
- The Nu Nation Project (1998)

=== Kirk Franklin and 1 Nation Crew ===
- Kirk Franklin Presents 1NC (2000)

=== Kirk Franklin ===
- The Rebirth of Kirk Franklin (2002)
- Hero (2005)
- The Fight of My Life (2007)
- Hello Fear (2011)
- Losing My Religion (2015)
- Long, Live, Love (2019)
- Father’s Day (2023)
- I Am What I Am (2026)

=== Kirk Franklin & Maverick City Music ===
- Kingdom Book One (2022)

== Filmography ==
Film

Year	Title	Role	Notes
2000	Something to Sing About	Charles	TV Movie
2012	Joyful Noise	Baylor Sykes	
2021	Kirk Franklin's A Gospel Christmas	Himself	TV Movie
2022	The Night Before Christmas	Himself	
2023	Father's Day: A Kirk Franklin Story	Himself	Documentary
2024	K-Pops!	Himself	Cameo

Television

Year	Title	Role	Notes
1995	The 700 Club	Himself/musical guest	
1997	Late Show with David Letterman	Musical guest	
1998	All That	Musical guest	
1998	The Kirk Franklin Show	Himself	Pilot episode
1998	Sister, Sister	James Henry	
1998	The Tonight Show with Jay Leno	Musical guest	
2003	The Proud Family	Reverend Haygood (voice)	
2003	The Tonight Show with Jay Leno	Musical guest	
2004	The Tonight Show with Jay Leno	Musical guest	
2004	The 700 Club	Himself/special guest	
2005	The Oprah Winfrey Show	Himself/special guest	
2016	Steve Harvey	Himself/special guest	
2019	Steve	Himself/special guest	
2022	Kingdom Business	Deacon D'Wayne	
2023	Tamron Hall	Himself/special guest	
2023–25	The Proud Family: Louder and Prouder	Reverend Haygood (voice)	3 episodes
2025	Churchy	Freight Train	TV Series - Guest Star
2026	The Varnell Hill Show	Himself/musical guest	Episode: "Did Ya Miss Me"

== Awards ==
Franklin has received 20 Grammy Awards and 22 GMA Dove Awards. He has also received BET Awards, Soul Train Music Awards and Stellar Awards.
