= The Nu Nation Project =

Studio album by Kirk Franklin
- Released: September 22, 1998
- Recorded: 1997–1998
- Genre: Urban contemporary gospel
- Length: 70:59
- Labels: GospoCentric, Interscope

Kirk Franklin chronology
God's Property (1997)	The Nu Nation Project (1998)	Kirk Franklin presents 1NC (2000)

Singles from The Nu Nation Project
- 1. "Lean on Me" Released: 1998; 2. "Revolution" Released: 1998; 3. "Gonna Be a Lovely Day" Released: 1999

Professional ratings
Review scores
Source	Rating
AllMusic	4/5 stars
Rolling Stone	3/5 stars

The Nu Nation Project is the fifth album by Kirk Franklin. The album combined the choirs the Family and God's Property, and it featured the new group, One Nation Crew. It was released on September 22, 1998, debuting at number 7 on the Billboard 200 with first week sales of 105,000 units and was certified RIAA double platinum in March 2000 after selling 2 million copies in the US. The album won the 1999 Grammy Award for "Best Contemporary Soul Gospel Album". With sales of 3 million units, it is one of the best-selling gospel albums of all time.

== Track listing ==
#	Title	Time	Notes
1.	"Interlude: The Verdict"	1:30	
2.	"Revolution"	5:38	featuring Rodney Jerkins, Background vocals by One Nation Crew; co-produced by Rodney Jerkins
3.	"Lean on Me"	5:08	featuring Bono (lead singer of U2), Crystal Lewis, Mary J. Blige and R. Kelly; Background by the Family and Nu Nation; co-produced by Dan Shea
4.	"Something About the Name Jesus"	6:08	featuring Rance Allen and Men of Standard, Background by the Family
5.	"Riverside"	5:26	Background by the Family
6.	"He Loves Me"	5:43	Background by the Family
7.	"Gonna Be a Lovely Day"	5:41	Background by the Nu Nation and by the Family
8.	"Praise Joint [Remix]"	4:22	Background by God's Property
9.	"Hold Me Now"	5:51	Background by Nu Nation
10.	"You Are"	3:53	Background by the Family, Gospel Tabernacle Church Choir
11.	"Interlude: The Car (Stomp)"	1:25	
12.	"If You've Been Delivered"	3:34	Background by Nu Nation, O.D. Wyatt High School Choir, featuring D.J. Ernie Green (Ernie G)
13.	"Smile Again"	6:52	featuring Donnie McClurkin and James Henderson; Background by God's Property
14	"Love [Remix]"	0:39	Background by Nu Nation
15	"My Desire"	4:17	featuring Fred Hammond Background by the Family, O.D. Wyatt High School Choir
16	"Blessing in the Storm"	3:29	Background by the Family
17	"I Can"	1:23	Background by the Family

== Personnel ==
Production

- Chris Bell – engineer

Vocalists

- Kirk Franklin – lead vocals
- Rodney Jerkins – rap vocals on "Revolution"
- Bono – lead vocals on "Lean on Me"
- Crystal Lewis – lead vocals on "Lean on Me"
- Mary J. Blige – lead vocals on "Lean on Me"
- R. Kelly – lead vocals on "Lean on Me"
- Rance Allen – lead vocals on "Something About the Name Jesus"
- Men of Standard – background vocals on "Something About the Name Jesus"
- Fred Hammond – lead vocals on "My Desire"
- Donnie McClurkin – lead vocals on "Smile Again"
- James Henderson – lead vocals on "Gonna Be a Lovely Day" and "Smile Again"
- Lakiesha Grandy – lead vocals on "He Loves Me" and "Gonna Be a Lovely Day"
- Dalon Collins – lead vocals on "Lean on Me" and "Gonna Be a Lovely Day"
- Caltomeesh West – lead vocals on "Gonna Be a Lovely Day"
- Tamela Mann – lead vocals on "Lean on Me" and "Gonna Be a Lovely Day"
- The Family – background vocals on "Lean on Me", "Riverside", "He Loves Me", "You Are", "Blessing In The Storm", "My Desire", "I Can" and "Lovely Day"
- God's Property – background vocals on "Praise Joint (Remix)" and "Smile Again"
- One Nation Crew – background vocals on "Revolution"
- O.D. Wyatt High School Choir – background vocals on "If You've Been Delivered" and "My Desire"

Instrumentalists

- Kirk Franklin – piano, programming
- Bobby Sparks – keyboards, organ, piano, strings, programming, drum programming
- Jerome Allen – bass
- Mark Harper – lead guitar, acoustic guitar
- Jerome Harmon – organ
- Len Barrett – percussion
- Erick J. Morgan – live drums
- Dan Shea – piano, keyboards and rhythm programming on "Lean On Me"
- Nathan East – bass on "Lean On Me"
- Michael Landau – guitar On "Lean On Me"
- Ricky Lawson – drums on "Lean On Me"
- Jeremy Haynes – live drums on "Riverside"
- Malcolm Robertson – trombone on "My Desire"
- Skip Warren– trumpet on "My Desire"
- Lee Charles Mitchell – tenor saxophone On "My Desire"
- Jack Williams – trumpet on "My Desire"

Ref. Album credit notes

== Chart performance ==
=== Weekly charts ===
Chart (1998)	Peak position
US Billboard 200	7
US Top Christian Albums (Billboard)	1
US Top Gospel Albums (Billboard)	1
US Top R&B/Hip-Hop Albums (Billboard)	4

=== Year-end charts ===
Chart (1998)	Position
US Billboard 200	164
US Top R&B/Hip-Hop Albums (Billboard)	65
Chart (1999)	Position
US Billboard 200	86
US Top R&B/Hip-Hop Albums (Billboard)	32
Chart (2025)	Position
US Gospel Albums (Billboard)	12
