= Kirk Franklin Presents 1NC =

Studio album by Kirk Franklin and One Nation Crew
- Released: February 8, 2000/August 15, 2000
- Recorded: 1999
- Genre: Urban contemporary gospel
- Length: 59:28
- Label: B-Rite/Interscope/MCA

Kirk Franklin chronology
The Nu Nation Project (1998)	Kirk Franklin Presents 1NC (2000)	The Rebirth of Kirk Franklin (2002)

One Nation Crew chronology
Kirk Franklin Presents 1NC (2000)

Professional ratings
Review scores
Source	Rating
Allmusic	3.5/5 stars
USA Today	3.5/4 stars

Kirk Franklin Presents 1NC is the only collaborative album by Kirk Franklin with the One Nation Crew. It was released on August 15, 2000, the first to be released after the retirement of the Family.

== Track listing ==
All songs written by Kirk Franklin except the interludes, "I Can't Live Without You" (Brandon Kizer, Candy West, Myron Butler, Nathan Young) and "Be Like Him".

#	Title	Time
1.	"Interlude"	1:21
2.	"Movin’ On"	3:26
3.	"Unconditional"	4:03
4.	"Interlude"	0:06
5.	"Breath Away"	5:22
6.	"Be Like Him"	2:32
7.	"Nobody"	4:32
8.	"Interlude"	0:54
9.	"Donna"	4:36
10.	"Free"	4:47
11.	"Interlude"	0:20
12.	"Hands Up"	3:48
13.	"When You Fall"	4:42
14.	"Could’ve Been Me"	4:06
15.	"Interlude: Prayer in Schools"	0:31
16.	"Lost Hearts"	4:24
17.	"I Can’t Live Without You"	4:44
18.	"In Your Grace"	5:15
