= The Rebirth of Kirk Franklin =

Live album by Kirk Franklin
- Released: February 19, 2002
- Recorded: June 16, 2000–October 2001
- Venues: Lakewood Church, Houston, Texas
- Genre: Urban contemporary gospel
- Length: 78:12
- Label: GospoCentric

Kirk Franklin chronology
Kirk Franklin presents 1NC (2000)	The Rebirth of Kirk Franklin (2002)	A Season of Remixes (2003)

Professional ratings
Review scores
Source	Rating
AllMusic	4/5 stars

The Rebirth of Kirk Franklin is the seventh album released by Kirk Franklin. The U.S. release on GospoCentric Records occurred on February 19, 2002. The album was recorded live on June 16, 2000 at Lakewood Church in Houston, Texas. Originally scheduled to be released sometime in mid-June or early July 2001, the album encountered multiple delays primarily due to modifying songs before finally being released on February 19, 2002. The album debuted at number 4 on the Billboard 200 with first week sales of 91,000 copies and was certified Platinum in May 2003 by the Recording Industry Association of America (RIAA) after selling 1 million copies in the US; it is one of the best-selling gospel albums of all time.

== Track listing ==
#	Title	Time	Notes
1.	Intro	2:09	
2.	Hosanna	5:07	Strings & Horns arranged by Lloyd Barry
3.	Caught Up (featuring Shirley Caesar)	5:57	
4.	911 (featuring Bishop T.D. Jakes & Scene 23)	4:41	Background Vocals: Scene 23, Angel Taylor, Chanelle Haynes, Ashley Guilbert, Candy West, Eric Dawkins, John Gray, LeDon Bishop, Tamela Mann & Myron Butler
5.	The Blood Song (featuring Donnie McClurkin, Crystal Lewis & Jaci Velasquez)	5:36	Strings arranged by Chris McDonald
6.	Brighter Day	5:40	Strings & Horns arranged by Lloyd Barry
7.	My Life, My Love, My All	6:22	Strings arranged by Chris McDonald
8.	Lookin' Out For Me (featuring Willie Neal Johnson)	5:53	
9.	He Reigns (The Medley) (featuring Papa San)	4:27	DJ Turntables: Ernie Green; Strings & Horns arranged by Shaun Martin & Lloyd Barry
10.	Interlude	2:37	
11.	Don't Cry	6:08	Piano: Richard Smallwood; Strings arranged by Chris McDonald
12.	The Transition	0:46	
13.	Always	6:44	Strings arranged by Chris McDonald
14.	When I Get There	5:41	Strings & Horns arranged by Lloyd Barry
15.	Interlude	0:43	
16.	Outro (The Blood) (featuring Yolanda Adams & Alvin Slaughter)	5:11	Contains a replayed sample from "The Blood Will Never Lose Its Power" performed by Andraé Crouch & The Disciples
17.	Throw Yo Hands Up (featuring tobyMac)	4:28	Bonus Track; Strings & Horns arranged by Shaun Martin

"Throw Yo Hands Up" was featured in the Xbox game Project Gotham Racing under the artist name Souljahz.

== Personnel ==
=== Vocalists ===
Note: Members from One Nation Crew are featured in the choir

Faith Anderson, Joy Willis, Dinora Brandon, Shanika Leeks, Daphanie Wright, Joy Hill, Carinia Hill, Myron Butler, Machelle Robinson, Ashley Guilbert, Karla Nivens, Sheila Ingram, LeTitia Calhoun-Smith, Kendra Greene, Hope Jones, Jana Bell, Nathan Young, Krista Norman, Tierannye Daniels, Tiwanna Phillips, Brandon Kizer, Candy West, Patricia Rangel, Lashonda Watson, Frank Lawson, Heith Guilbert, Douglas Fell, Donald Wright Jr., Cortrinia Holly, Tommy King, Jason Huff, Michael “Michah” Kimbrow, Demetrius McClendon

=== Musicians ===
- Bobby Sparks II: Hammond B-3, Keyboards
- Shaun Martin: Keyboards
- Keith Taylor: Bass
- Lawrence "Peabody" Ferrell: Drums
- Todd Parsnow: Lead Guitar, Acoustic Guitar
- Terry Baker: Drums
- Michael Robinson: Piano
- Rickey “Bongo" Carthen: Percussion
- Mark Baldwin: Electric Guitar, Acoustic Guitar
- David Huntsinger: Piano
- Ernest "Ernie G" Greene: DJ
- Chris McDonald: Trombone
- Vinny Ciesielski: Trumpet
- Quinton Ware: Trumpet
- Doug Moffitt: Tenor Sax
- Jim Horn: Baritone Sax, Alto Sax
- The Nashville Strings: Strings

== Charts ==
=== Weekly charts ===
Chart (2002)	Peak position
US Billboard 200	4
US Top Christian Albums (Billboard)	1
US Top Gospel Albums (Billboard)	1
US Top R&B/Hip-Hop Albums (Billboard)	1

=== Year-end charts ===
Chart (2002)	Position
US Billboard 200	95
US Top R&B/Hip-Hop Albums (Billboard)	34
Chart (2025)	Position
US Top Gospel Albums (Billboard)	24

=== Decade-end charts ===
Chart (2000–2009)	Peak position
US Top Gospel Albums (Billboard)	3
