= Whatcha Lookin' 4 =

Live album by Kirk Franklin & The Family
- Released: April 30, 1996
- Recorded: May 1994
- Genre: Gospel
- Length: 1:17:56
- Label: GospoCentric Records
- Producers: Kirk Franklin; Buster & Shavoni

Kirk Franklin & The Family chronology
Kirk Franklin & the Family Christmas (1995)	Whatcha Lookin' 4 (1996)	God's Property (1997)

Professional ratings
Review scores
Source	Rating
Allmusic	3/5 stars
Muzik	4.5/5 stars

Whatcha Lookin' 4 is an American Gospel music album released on April 30, 1996, by Kirk Franklin & the Family on GospoCentric Records. With sales of 2 million units, it is one of the best-selling gospel albums of all time.

== Background ==
Whatcha Lookin' 4 is the third album released by Kirk Franklin and The Family. It also features backup by God's Property. The U.S. release on GospoCentric Records occurred on April 30, 1996. The album was recorded about two years earlier in May 1994, but the release date was delayed three times.

All the songs on the album were written by Franklin except "Anything 4 U" (written by Kirk Franklin, Louis "Buster" Brown III & Scott "Shavoni" Parker), "Jesus Paid It All" (arranged by Franklin), and "When I Think About Jesus".

Kirk Franklin & The Family: Kirk Franklin, Jeannette Johnson, Keisha Grandy, Terri Pace, Stephanie Glynn, Demetrice "De" Clinkscale, Dalon Collins, David Mann, Darrell Blair, Byron Cole, Jon "J.D." Drummond, Yolanda McDonald, Sheila "Mother" Brice, Tamela Mann, Theresa Young, Carrie "Mousey" Young Davis

== Track listing ==
#	Title	Time	Vocalist(s)	Notes
1.	Savior More than Life	6:44	Lead Vocals: Keisha Grandy	Acoustic Guitar: Bryan James
2.	Whatcha Lookin' 4	4:25	Lead Vocals: Darrell Blair, Dalon Collins, Tamela Mann, Kirk Franklin; Background Vocals: God's Property	
3.	Melodies from Heaven	4:34	All Vocals: Kirk Franklin & The Family	
4.	Conquerors	8:24	Lead Vocals: Dalon Collins	Percussion Programming: Lawrence Robinson
5.	Don't Take Your Joy Away	6:35	Lead Vocals: Tamela Mann	
6.	When I Think About Jesus	1:38		
7.	Mama's Song	4:16	Lead Vocals: Kirk Franklin	
8.	Jesus Paid It All	5:04	Lead Vocals: Kirk Franklin, Darrell Blair, Dalon Collins	
9.	I Love You Jesus	7:25	Lead Vocals: Teresa Young, Stephanie Glynn, Sheila Brice	
10.	Washed Away	5:20	Lead Vocals: Jeannette Johnson, Carrie Young-Davis	
11.	Where the Spirit Is	4:03	Lead Vocals: Jon Drummond	
12.	Let Me Touch You	5:26	Lead Vocals: Dalon Collins	
13.	Anything 4 U	5:08	Lead Vocals: David Mann, Yolanda McDonald, DemeTrice Clinkscale, Darrell Blair	Music Programming & Synth Drums: Buster & Shavoni; Recording Engineers: Bob Tucker (Basic Tracks); Louis "Buster" Brown (Overdubs)
14.	Whatcha Lookin' 4 (remix)	4:36	Lead Vocals: Kirk Franklin, Dalon Collins, David Mann, Tamela Mann	Trumpet: Lawrence Robinson; Mixed by Craig Burbridge, Dalon Collins, Tamela Mann, David Mann, Chris Simpson,
15.	Melodies from Heaven (skate remix)	4:18	Lead Vocals: Kirk Franklin	Mixed by Craig Burbridge

== Certifications and Chart success ==
The album was certified Gold on August 16, 1996 and Platinum on May 28, 1997.

Whatcha Lookin' 4 was #1 on the Billboard Top Gospel Albums Chart and Top Contemporary Christian Chart in 1996. That same year the album reached #3 on the Top R&B/Hip-Hop Albums Chart and #23 on the Billboard 200 Chart.

== Personnel ==
- Kirk Franklin - Piano & Synths
- Erick Morgan - Drums
- Jerome Harmon - Hammond C-3 & Synths
- Bobby Sparks - Grand Piano, Synths, Hammond Organ, Minimoog, Prophet 5
- Jerome Allen - Bass
- Anthony Thomas - Guitar
- Charlie Paakkari - Audio Mixing
- Eric Lewin - Audio Mixing
- Malcolm Harper - Recording Engineer (tracks 1–12, 14–15)
- Gordon Garrison - Assistant Recording Engineer (tracks 1–12, 14–15)
- Eric Lewin - Assistant Recording Engineer (tracks 1–12, 14–15)

== Awards ==
=== Awards Wins ===
Whatcha Lookin' 4 won the Grammy Award for Best Contemporary Soul Gospel Album in 1997.

== Charts ==
=== Weekly charts ===
Chart (1996)	Peak position
US Billboard 200	23
US Top Christian Albums (Billboard)	1
US Top R&B/Hip-Hop Albums (Billboard)	3

=== Year-end charts ===
Chart (1996)	Position
US Billboard 200	136
US Top R&B/Hip-Hop Albums (Billboard)	25
