= Kirk Franklin & the Family Christmas =

Christmas

Studio album by Kirk Franklin & The Family
- Released: November 7, 1995
- Genre: Urban contemporary gospel
- Length: 53:01
- Label: GospoCentric

Kirk Franklin & The Family chronology
Kirk Franklin & the Family (1993)	Christmas (1995)	Whatcha Lookin' 4 (1996)

Professional ratings
Review scores
Source	Rating
Allmusic	3/5 stars

Christmas is an album by Kirk Franklin & the Family. Serving as their first and currently their only Christmas album.

== Synopsis ==
Christmas is the second album by Franklin and is also the second album released by Franklin in collaboration with The Family Choir. The U.S. release on Interscope Records occurred on November 7, 1995.

== Track listing ==
#	Title	Time	Notes
1.	Silent Night	3:49	Lead: Kirk Franklin
2.	Now Behold the Lamb	6:58	Lead: Tamela Mann and Dalon Collins
3.	Jesus Is the Reason for the Season	5:45	Lead: Kirk Franklin and Chris Simpson Background vocals by God's Property
4.	Go Tell It on the Mountain	5:54	Lead: Sheila Brice and Stephanie Glynn
5.	They Need to Know	3:59	Lead: David Mann
6.	There's No Christmas Without You	4:13	Lead: Kirk Franklin and Demetrice Clinkscale
7.	O Come All Ye Faithful	5:18	Lead: Jeannette Johnson
8.	The Night That Christ Was Born	4:32	Lead: Kisha Grandy and Carrie Young-Davis
9.	Thank You For Your Child	4:35	Lead: Kirk Franklin & The Family
10.	Love Song	4:12	Lead: Dalon Collins, and Chris Simpson
11.	Silver & Gold (Remix)	3:46	Lead: Kirk Franklin & The Family

== Certifications ==
The album was certified Gold on January 22, 1999.
