= I Am What I Am (Kirk Franklin album) =

Studio album by Kirk Franklin
- Released: October 30, 2026
- Recorded: 2025–2026
- Genre: Gospel
- Length: 1:05:28
- Labels: Tribl Records; Fo Yo Soul
- Producers: Kirk Franklin; Adam Blackstone; Justin "JP" Pearson; J. White Did It; Maxwell Stark; Ron Hill

Kirk Franklin chronology
Father's Day (2023)	I Am What I Am (2026)

I Am What I Am is the fourteenth studio album by American musician Kirk Franklin. The album was released by Tribl Records, a division of Uptown Records, alongside Fo Yo Soul Recordings.

== Background ==
Franklin's inspirational meaning behind the album title serves as a final, unapologetic statement of self-acceptance and a "mic drop" on decades of public scrutiny over his faith, creative choices and cross-genre collaborations. The album was also Franklin's first ever double album release, consisting of 14 tracks complementing two sides of his artistic craft, with disc one being studio tracks embracing his boundary-pushing musical vision and disc two being live recordings that traces back to his original choir-driven gospel roots.

== Track listing ==
Disc 1 track listing
No.	Title	Length
1.	"Free Me Tonight" (featuring Jelly Roll)	3:11
2.	"This Time" (featuring GloRilla)	2:46
3.	"Hope in You" (featuring Davido)	3:27
4.	"It Gets Better" (featuring Tobe Nwigwe)	3:44
5.	"Able"	2:53
6.	"Do It Again"	3:49
7.	"Stay"	4:46
Total length:		21:36

Disc 2 track listing
No.	Title	Length
1.	"Someday (Live)"	6:35
2.	"It Is Well (Live)"	6:31
3.	"Welcome In (Live)"	5:46
4.	"Thank You for Everything (Live)" (with Karen Clark Sheard)	6:36
5.	"Holy (Live)"	7:12
6.	"Beautiful Thorns (Live)"	5:22
7.	"Time (Live)" (with Tim Rogers)	5:40
Total length:		43:52

== Charts ==
Chart performance for I Am What I Am
Chart (2026)	Peak position
UK Christian & Gospel Albums (Official Charts)	12
US Top Gospel Albums (Billboard)	1
