= One Nation Crew =

American gospel vocal group

One Nation Crew (also 1NC) was a gospel vocal group assembled by Kirk Franklin for a full-length album and tour. The group had ten members of various musical backgrounds. They were first featured on the album The Nu Nation Project on some of the tracks. The next album they were on, Kirk Franklin Presents 1NC (B-Rite Music, 2000), was produced by Franklin and Al West, and reached #58 on the Billboard 200. The group performed at the Apollo Theater, at the Grammy Awards, the Essence Awards, and Motown Live in 2000-01. They also sung background on the album The Rebirth of Kirk Franklin which was recorded the same year as they toured.

== Members ==
- Kirk Franklin
- Markita Knight
- Jana Bell
- Candy West
- Ashley Guilbert
- Sheila Ingram
- Brandon Kizer
- Nate Larson
- Frank Lawson
- Shantael Johnson
- Nate Young
- Myron Butler
- Farrell Mannings
- Shanika Leeks
