= Beverly Crawford =

African American gospel vocalist

- Born: Beverly Renae Camps; August 31, 1963 (age 62); Gainesville, Florida
- Genres: Gospel music
- Occupations: Singer, Co-Pastor of Landmark Holy Temple of God, Inc.
- Years active: 1989-Present
- Labels: JDI Records, Warner Bros. Alliance

Beverly Renae Crawford (born Beverly Renae Camps; August 31, 1963) is an American gospel vocalist and co-pastor. She is best known for singing with the New Life Singers on Bobby Jones Gospel on the Black Entertainment Television (BET). Her signature songs include "Praise Jehovah", "Run to the Water", "He's Done Enough", and most recently "It's About Time For A Miracle". Her album Now That I'm Here was nominated for Best Traditional Soul Gospel Album at the 41st Annual Grammy Awards.

== Early life ==
Born in Gainesville, Florida, Beverly is one of seven children born to pastor Walter Camps. She started singing at church at the age of three.

== Career ==
In the late 1980s, her husband, Todd Crawford, recorded a homemade video of her and her sisters singing and submitted copies to several gospel companies, with Bobby Jones Gospel the only one responding. Being impressed with the sisters, Bobby Jones invited them to sing on his show, and after about a couple of visits, he invited Beverly to join his group, New Life.

New Life, were a group of women by the name of Emily Harris, Angela Primm, Nuana Dunlap, Franchine Smith, later Roberta Higgs joined the group and Beverly herself. Beverly continued with Dr. Jones, until 1997.

Beverly stayed on the show from 1990 to 1997, where she was a favorite every week. She began her solo career in 1995 with the release of Jesus, Precious King on Warner Alliance Records (now defunct), followed three years later with Now That I'm Here, which includes the hit title song and "Just As Soon (I'll Be Shouting)". The latter album was nominated for a Grammy in 1999.

In 2001, Crawford released a studio album (except for one live song) entitled Beverly on Dexterity Records (the label of the prominent minister Bishop T.D. Jakes) and in 2003 returned to the live church setting with Live Family and Friends which includes "Higher in the Lord" and "Hold On", and featured guest such as Bobby Jones, Shirley Murdock, Melvin Williams of the Williams Brothers, and her daughter Latrina Crawford.

In 2007, she released her fifth album, Live from Los Angeles, on the LA-based JDI label, which contained the number one hit "He's Done Enough". The song stayed on the top ten lists for over a year.

In January 2009, Crawford won her first Stellar Gospel Music Award for "Traditional Female Vocalist of the Year" for her 2007 release.

On September 19, 2009, she recorded her second album with JDI, live from Los Angeles at Faithful Central Church. It's entitled Live from Los Angeles - Volume 2 and will feature guests, including Shirley Murdock. It was released on September 14, 2010, and includes the hit single "It's About Time for a Miracle". In 2012, she won her second Stellar Gospel Music Award for "Traditional Female Vocalist of the Year" for this record.

Her current release is "Thank You For All You've Done", which was released in May 2014 on JDI. It debuted at #1 on the Gospel Music Billboard Charts. It contains the hit "Sweeping Through The City".

== Personal life ==
Crawford lives in Gainesville, Florida, where she co-founded a church, the Gainesville Family Life Center, with her husband, the Reverend Todd Crawford Sr. They have a daughter and son.

== Discography ==
=== Albums ===
- Jesus, Precious King (1995)
- Now That I'm Here (1998)
- Beverly (2001)
- Live: Family and Friends (2003)
- Live From Los Angeles (2007)
- Live From Los Angeles, Vol. 2 (2010)
- Choo Choo: Beverly's Testimony (2010)
- Churchy Christmas/Joy To The World (2012)
- Thank You For All You've Done (2014)

=== Singles ===
- Lord You Are Good (2023)
