= Declaration (This Is It) =

"Declaration (This is It)"

Single by Kirk Franklin

from the album The Fight of My Life
- Released: October 23, 2007
- Recorded: 2007
- Genre: Gospel
- Length: 4:24
- Label: GospoCentric
- Songwriters: Kirk Franklin, Kenny Loggins, & Michael McDonald
- Producer: Kirk Franklin

Kirk Franklin singles chronology
"September" (2007)	"Declaration (This is It)" (2007)	"Jesus" (2008)

"Declaration (This is It)" is a gospel song by Kirk Franklin from his 2007 album The Fight of My Life. The song contains samples of and interpolations of "This Is It" by Michael McDonald and Kenny Loggins who are credited with Franklin as composers of the song.

Franklin's song "Declaration (This Is It!)" is a remake of the song "This Is It!" by pop-rock singer Kenny Loggins. This song motivates and stirs the soul to action. It denounces the troubles of life's current situation, and proclaims victory through faith in God.

— Takiela Bynum, Blogcritics Magazine

== Charts ==
"Declaration (This Is It)" became a crossover hit, moving to #13 on the U.S. Billboard Hot Adult R&B Airplay Chart and #35 on the U.S. Billboard Hot R&B/Hip-Hop Songs Chart.

Chart (2008)	Peak position
U.S. Billboard Bubbling Under Hot 100 Singles	23
U.S. Billboard Hot Gospel Songs	1
U.S. Billboard Hot R&B/Hip-Hop Songs	35

== Personnel ==
=== Vocals ===
1. Anaysha Figueroa
2. Charmaine Swimpson
3. Ashley Guilbert
4. Nikki Ross
5. Melodie Davis
6. Issac Carree
7. Joy Hill
8. Myron Butler
9. Caltomeesh West
10. Deonis Cook
11. Anthony Evans

=== Instruments ===
1. Robert "Sput Searight - Drums
2. Ayron Lewis - Hammond B-3
3. Rodney Lawson - Lead guitar
4. DaBoyz'nBarry - Strings & Horns

=== Other personnel ===
1. Programming - Shaun Martin, Kirk Franklin
2. Ernest "Ernie G" Green - DJ
3. Larry Gold - String arrangement
4. Chris Godbey - String recording
5. Tre Nagella - String recording
6. Eric Hartman - Engineer, Asst. Engineer
7. Ryan Moys - String recording
8. Jason Goldstein - Mixing

*Note: Personnel listing from The Fight of My Life album liner.

== Awards ==
The song was nominated for a Dove Award for Urban Recorded Song of the Year at the 40th GMA Dove Awards.
