= Lean on Me (Kirk Franklin song) =

1998 single by Kirk Franklin

Single by Kirk Franklin featuring Mary J. Blige, Bono, R. Kelly, Crystal Lewis & The Family

from the album The Nu Nation Project
- Released: September 22, 1998
- Recorded: 1998
- Genre: Urban contemporary gospel
- Length: 5:08
- Label: GospoCentric, Interscope
- Songwriter(s): Kirk Franklin
- Producer(s): Kirk Franklin; Dan Shea

Kirk Franklin singles chronology
"You Are the Only One" (1997)	"Lean on Me" (1998)	"Revolution" (1998)

"Lean on Me" is a song by American gospel artist Kirk Franklin. Released in 1998, the song greatly helped ascend Kirk Franklin's album The Nu Nation Project. The Nu Nation Project went on to top the Billboard Contemporary Christian Albums chart for 23 weeks and the Billboard Gospel Albums chart for 49 weeks, and brought Franklin his third Grammy.

== History ==
Released as the first single in 1998, "Lean on Me" helped catapult The Nu Nation Project to becoming a 2× platinum gospel album. The single is also an interpretation of the Bill Withers song “"Lean on Me”. The song was a collaboration with artists Bono, Mary J. Blige, Crystal Lewis, Tamela Mann, and R. Kelly. The song was heavily praised for reaching both the gospel and secular radio. 1.5 million copies of the single have been sold to date and the single was nominated for Song of the Year Category for the 41st Grammy Awards. The single was also nominated for Best R&B Song and Best R&B Performance by a Duo or Group with Vocal.

Kirk performed "Lean On Me" at the Grammy Awards in Los Angeles on 24 February before a TV audience of 1.5 billion people alongside Bono, Gerald Levert, Crystal Lewis, and Mary J. Blige.

== Live performances ==
- "Lean on Me" was performed at the 41st Grammy Awards.

== Chart performance ==
Weekly chart performance for "Lean on Me"
Chart (1998)	Peak position
Netherlands (Single Top 100)	57
New Zealand (Recorded Music NZ)	27
Poland (Polish music charts)	5
US Billboard Hot 100	79
US Hot R&B/Hip-Hop Songs (Billboard)	26

== See also ==
- Gospel Music
- Kirk Franklin
