= Father's Day (Kirk Franklin album) =

Studio album by Kirk Franklin
- Released: October 6, 2023
- Recorded: 2023
- Genre: Gospel
- Length: 40:24
- Labels: RCA Inspiration; Fo Yo Soul
- Producers: Kirk Franklin; Ron Hill; Chandler Moore; Devin Morrison; Kenneth KP Paige; Justin Pearson; Demetrius Smith; Max Stark; Maxwell Stark

Kirk Franklin chronology
Kingdom Book One (2022)	Father's Day (2023)	I Am What I Am (2026)

Professional ratings
Review scores
Source	Rating
Journal of Gospel Music	4/5 stars

Father's Day is the thirteenth studio album by American musician Kirk Franklin. The album was released by RCA Inspiration, a division of RCA Records, alongside Fo Yo Soul Recordings.

== Background ==
The first single "All Things" was released in May 2023. The second single "Try Love" was released in August 2023, both singles charted in the top 10 of the Billboard Hot Gospel Songs chart. In September 2023, a 35-minute documentary called Father's Day: A Kirk Franklin Story premiered on Franklin's YouTube channel, the documentary serves as a visual accompaniment for the album which was only meant to be recording sessions and behind the scenes footage, however while filming the documentary, speculation about the real identity of Franklin's biological father had begun to circulate at his aunt's funeral to which he did not attend due to his estranged mother being there. A man by the name of Richard Hubbard who attended the funeral told a mutual friend that he once had relations with Franklin's mother, which had sparked speculation among those in attendance as to whether he could really be Franklin's father. Franklin previously believed that his father was another man, Dwight Allen (who died in 2020) after he was told by his mother. A DNA test was taken and the results came back positive that Richard Hubbard was the father. In the documentary, Franklin opens up about the challenges of growing up as an adopted child, it also shows the events of him meeting his biological father for the first time, reuniting with his estranged mother as well as reconciling with his oldest son Kerrion whom he had a complicated relationship with.

== Track listing ==
Father's Day track listing
No.	Title	Length
1.	"Welcome Home"	5:11
2.	"Try Love"	4:32
3.	"All Things"	3:09
4.	"Needs"	3:27
5.	"You Still Love Us"	3:24
6.	"Listen"	4:24
7.	"Unconditional" (featuring Le'Andria Johnson)	4:01
8.	"Again" (featuring Chandler Moore, Tori Kelly, Jonathan McReynolds and Jekalyn Carr)	6:14
9.	"Again & Again" (featuring Kelontae Gavin and Maranda Curtis)	2:41
10.	"Somebody's Son"	3:21
Total length:		40:24

== Charts ==
Chart performance for Father's Day
Chart (2023)	Peak position
UK Christian & Gospel Albums (Official Charts)	13
US Billboard 200	148
US Top Gospel Albums (Billboard)	1
