= O. D. Wyatt High School =

Public school in Texas, United States

Oscar Dean Wyatt High School

Location
- 2400 East Seminary Drive; Fort Worth, Texas 76119; United States; 32.682689°N 97.294284°W

Information
- Type: Public, Secondary
- School district: Fort Worth Independent School District
- Teaching staff: 101.44 (FTE)
- Enrollment: 1,443 (2017-18)
- Student to teacher ratio: 14.23
- Colors: Columbia blue, navy, and white
- Mascot: Chaparral
- Website: odwyatt.fwisd.org

Oscar Dean Wyatt High School is a secondary school in Fort Worth, Texas, United States. The school is located at 2400 East Seminary Drive. The school is a part of the Fort Worth Independent School District. In 2022 the student body was 54 percent Hispanic and 38 percent African American.

The school serves sections of Fort Worth and the FWISD portion of Forest Hill.

== History ==
The school was named after Oscar Dean Wyatt, a longtime principal of R. L. Paschal High School.

When the school opened, the student body chose its mascot, the chaparral, from Fort Worth's American Basketball League team, the Ft Worth Chaparrals.

In 2019 some area residents of Rosemont, in the portion zoned to Paschal, protested when they found the FWISD planned to rezone them to South Hills High School.

=== 1976 shooting ===
In 1976, student Ronald Allridge of O.D. Wyatt High School shot two fellow students; Lorenzo Kneeland, 15, was fatally shot, while James Christian, also 15, was shot and injured but survived. Ronald was arrested, and was sentenced to 10 years in prison as a juvenile. He was released in 1983. Ronald and his younger brother James later gained infamy for a series of violent holdups and murders in the Fort Worth area; January–March 1985.

== Attendance zone ==
In 2019 a portion of Rosemont was zoned to Wyatt.

== Athletics ==
O.D. Wyatt Chaparrals compete in the following sports in UIL Class 5A:

- Football
- Basketball (Boys & Girls)
- Track & Field (Boys & Girls)
- Baseball
- Volleyball
- Softball
- Soccer
- Tennis
- Wrestling
- Golf
