= The Rance Allen Group =

Gospel music singers (1970–2020)

- Origin: Monroe, Michigan, United States
- Genres: Gospel, R&B
- Years active: 1970–2020
- Labels: Gospel Truth Records, Stax, Bellmark
- Past members: Rance Allen; Thomas Allen; Steve Allen

The Rance Allen Group was a gospel music group formed in Monroe, Michigan, and based in Toledo, Ohio, named after its lead vocalist, Bishop Rance Allen.

The group was formed by vocalist, guitarist, pianist, and songwriter Rance Allen (b. Monroe, Michigan) with his brothers Tom (drums) and Steve (bass guitar); another brother, Esau (percussionist), joined the group on an intermittent basis. During an appearance at a gospel talent contest in Detroit, Michigan, they came to the attention of one of the judges, record promoter Dave Clark, who worked for Stax Records. The group was the first to be signed to the Stax imprint Gospel Truth, and they recorded for the Stax organization throughout the 1970s. In 1972, the group appeared in the documentary film Wattstax. Following this appearance, the group was named "Best Religious Group" by the National Association of Television and Radio Announcers (NATRA). David Porter co-produced the group's 1975 album A Soulful Experience, for which he wrote an autobiographical song, "Just Found Me".

The group's incorporation of rock and soul into traditional black gospel music prefigured the crossover success of such artists as Amy Grant, Andrae Crouch, and The Winans. In 1978, the group had a Top 30 R&B hit, "I Belong to You".

The group received a nomination at the 34th Grammy Awards for Best Contemporary Soul Gospel Album for their 1991 album Phenomenon.

The group's latest release, God Has Been So Good, is a collaboration with hip-hop pioneer Glenn "Sweety G" Toby, producer Bernard Jackson and new gospel artist Mydason.

== Rance Allen ==
Rance Allen (November 19, 1948 – October 31, 2020) was an American Bishop, Minister, and gospel musician, and the founder and leader of the Rance Allen Group. Known for his extremely wide vocal range and powerful singing voice, Allen became known as the main lead vocalist and the leader of the influential group.

He was the senior pastor of the New Bethel Church Of God In Christ in Toledo, Ohio, since its July 1985 establishment. In November 2011, Rance Allen was elevated to the office of Bishop in the Church of God in Christ, for the Michigan Northwestern Harvest Jurisdiction.

Allen was born in 1948 in Monroe, Michigan to Thomas and Emma Pearl Allen, to a family of African American, Afro-Caribbean, and Afro-Latino American heritage. He had 11 siblings: six sisters and five brothers. Allen founded the Rance Allen Group in Detroit in 1969 joined by his brothers Thomas and Steve.

Allen was married to Ellen Marie Allen (née Groves). The two were married on December 1, 1970. The couple had no children together.

Allen and his group had performed with many gospel musicians throughout the country, including Andrae Crouch, Marvin Winans, Bebe and Cece Winans, the Clark Sisters, Kirk Franklin, Marvin Sapp, John P. Kee, Fred Hammond, Tye Tribbett, Shirley Caesar, and Donnie McClurkin. He also performed for President Barack Obama at a White House Celebration of Gospel Music and was nominated for five Grammy Awards.

Allen died on October 31, 2020, from complications due to a medical procedure he had the previous week. He was 71 years old.

== Awards ==
| Year | Award-giving body | Award | Reference |
|---|---|---|---|
| 2012 | Stellar Awards | Quartet of the Year: "The Live Experience II: Celebrating 40 Years of Music and Ministry" | |
| 2012 | Stellar Awards | Traditional Group/Duo of the Year: "The Live Experience II: Celebrating 40 Years of Music and Ministry" | |

== Discography ==
- Rance Allen Group (1972)
- Truth Is Where It's At (1972)
- Brothers (1973)
- Sanctified (1975; UK-only compilation)
- A Soulful Experience (1975; reissued 1981 as Ain't No Need Of Crying)
- Say My Friend (1977; reissued 1979 as The Way It Is)
- Straight from the Heart (1978; reissued on CD with bonus tracks in 1994)
- Smile (1979)
- I Feel Like Goin' On (1980)
- Hear My Voice (1983)
- I Give Myself to You (1984)
- The Best of The Rance Allen Group (1988) (Stax Records)
- Phenomenon (1991)
- Up Above My Head (1995 compilation)
- You Make Me Wanna Dance (1995)
- Let The Music Get Down In Your Soul (1997; vault release)
- Miracle Worker (2000)
- The Soulful Truth Of The Rance Allen Group (2001; UK-only compilation)
- All the Way (2002)
- Wattstax (various artists; box set) (2003)
- The Live Experience (2004)
- Closest Friend (2007)
- The Live Experience II (2011)
- Amazing Grace (2012)
- Celebrate (2014)
- Live From San Francisco (2016)
- God Has Been So Good (2020)
