= God's Property from Kirk Franklin's Nu Nation =

God's Property from Kirk Franklin's New Nation

Studio album by God's Property and Kirk Franklin
- Released: May 27, 1997
- Recorded: 1996
- Genre: Urban contemporary gospel
- Length: 72:03
- Labels: GospoCentric, Interscope

God's Property chronology
Whatcha Lookin' 4 (1996)	God's Property from Kirk Franklin's New Nation (1997)

Kirk Franklin chronology
Whatcha Lookin' 4 (1996)	God's Property from Kirk Franklin's Nu Nation (1997)	The Nu Nation Project (1998)

Professional ratings
Review scores
Source	Rating
Allmusic	4/5 stars

God's Property from Kirk Franklin's Nu Nation is a collaborative live album by God's Property and Kirk Franklin. It was released on May 27, 1997 recorded as a live-in-studio project in July 1996. At the time of its release, urban contemporary gospel had gained massive ground in the music industry, thus sending the album to its third position peak on the Billboard 200 album chart and making it the first gospel album to top the Top R&B/Hip-Hop Albums chart, where it reached number one on five nonconsecutive weeks. With sales of 3 million units, it is one of the best-selling gospel albums of all time.

== Track listing ==
#	Title	Time	Notes
1.	"Stomp (Remix)"	5:04	Written by Kirk Franklin (features interpolation of "One Nation Under A Groove" written by George Clinton, Jr., Garry Shider, and Walter Morrison, who are also credited with writing "Stomp"); Guest performance by Cheryl "Salt" James.
2.	"My Life Is In Your Hands"	5:34	Written by Kirk Franklin (It can be heard on the end credits to Spike Lee's "Get On The Bus", and is added to the soundtrack album 'Get On The Bus: music from and inspired by the motion picture', available on 40 Acres and A Mule MusicWorks and Interscope Records.)
3.	"It's Rainin'"	3:49	written by Larron Vaughn
4.	"More Than I Can Bear"	5:21	Written by Kirk Franklin
5.	"Up Above My Head"	4:11	written by Myron Butler
6.	"Love"	5:23	Written by Kirk Franklin
7.	"Sweet Spirit"	4:54	written by Robert Searight Jr.
8.	"Faith"	5:45	Written by Kirk Franklin (embodies portions of "Yes, We Can Can" by Allen Toussaint, who is also credited as a writer of this song)
9.	"You Are The Only One"	6:47	Written by Kirk Franklin and Greg Brown (contains interpolation of "If I Was Your Girlfriend" written by Prince Rogers Nelson).
10.	"So Good"	5:10	Written by Kirk Franklin
11.	"The Storm Is Over Now"	5:46	Written by Kirk Franklin
12.	"Stomp (Original Mix)"	5:36	Written by Kirk Franklin (features interpolation of "One Nation Under A Groove" written by George Clinton, Jr., Garry Shider, and Walter Morrison, who are also credited with writing "Stomp")
13.	"He'll Take The Pain Away"	8:40	Written by Kirk Franklin

== Chart performance and RIAA certification ==
The album debuted at #3 on the Billboard 200 with first week sales of 120,000 copies, making it the highest charting gospel album at the time (until Marvin Sapp's Here I Am debuted at #2 in 2010). It was also #1 on the Top R&B/Hip-Hop Albums chart for 5 non-consecutive weeks making it the first gospel album ever to top that chart. It was also #1 on the Top Gospel Albums chart for 42 consecutive weeks also making it the longest streak at #1 on that chart, and the album would remain on the chart for 105 weeks total. In October 2001 the album was certified triple platinum with over 3 million copies sold across the United States.

== Charts ==
=== Weekly charts ===
Chart (1997)	Peak position
US Billboard 200	3
US Top Gospel Albums (Billboard)	1
US Top R&B/Hip-Hop Albums (Billboard)	1

=== Year-end charts ===
Chart (1997)	Position
US Billboard 200	40
US Top R&B/Hip-Hop Albums (Billboard)	7
Chart (1998)	Position
US Billboard 200	175
US Top R&B/Hip-Hop Albums (Billboard)	67
Chart (2025)	Position
US Top Gospel Albums (Billboard)	21

=== Singles chart positions ===
==== "Stomp" ====
Year	Chart	Peak
1997	U.S. Billboard Rhythmic Top 40	12
1997	U.S. Billboard Hot R&B/Hip-Hop Airplay	1
1997	U.S. Billboard Hot 100 Airplay	52

== Personnel ==
Musicians

- Kirk Franklin: Piano/Organ
- Keith Taylor: Bass
- David "Paco" Cruz: Electric Guitar
- Bobby Sparks: Keyboards
- Shaun Martin: Keyboards/Organ
- Robert "Sput" Searight: Drums/Keyboards
- Jerome Harmon: Organ
- Lawrence Ferrell: Drums
- R.C. Williams: Organ/Keyboards
- Jerriel Carter: Trumpet
- Jason Davis: Saxophone
- Derrick Harris: Saxophone

== See also ==
- List of number-one R&B albums of 1997 (U.S.)
