= Kirk Franklin and the Family =

Kirk Franklin and the Family Live!

Live album by Kirk Franklin & the Family
- Released: June 29, 1993
- Recorded: July 25, 1992
- Venues: Grace Temple Seventh-day Adventist Church, Fort Worth, Texas
- Genres: Urban contemporary gospel, Traditional Gospel, soul, funk
- Length: 53:54
- Label: GospoCentric
- Producers: Rodney Frazier; Arthur Dyer

Kirk Franklin & the Family chronology
Kirk Franklin and the Family Live! (1993)	Christmas (1995)

Professional ratings
Review scores
Source	Rating
AllMusic	4.5/5 stars

Kirk Franklin and the Family (Live) is the debut album released by Kirk Franklin. The album was recorded by Franklin in collaboration with his seventeen-voice formed choir, the Family. It was released on June 29, 1993. With sales of 2 million units, it is one of the best-selling gospel albums of all time.

== Background information ==
The album was recorded live on July 25, 1992 at Grace Temple Seventh-day Adventist Church in Fort Worth, Texas and produced by Rodney Frazier and Arthur Dyer.

All songs on the album were written and arranged by Kirk Franklin. "Speak To Me" includes partial adaptation of a Stanley Brown/Hezekiah Walker composition.

== Track listing ==
#	Title	Time	Lead vocals	Notes
1.	Why We Sing	5:55	Kirk Franklin	Contains re-sung lyrics from "His Eye Is on the Sparrow" performed by Ethel Waters, based on Gospel hymn written by Civilla D. Martin & Charles H. Gabriel
2.	He's Able	4:05	Kirk Franklin; David Mann	
3.	Silver & Gold	4:52	Cassandra Cleveland	
4.	Call on the Lord	3:32	Sheila Brice	
5.	Real Love	5:22	Teresa Young; Dalon Collins; Yolanda McDonald	
6.	He Can Handle It	5:09	Kirk Franklin	
7.	A Letter from My Friend	5:41	Dalon Collins	
8.	The Family Worship Medley	7:55	Terri Pace; Nelda Washington; Demetrius Herefort; Darrell Blair; Tamela Mann	
9.	Speak to Me	4:19	Kirk Franklin; Byron Cole	
10.	Till We Meet Again	7:14	Carrie Young-Davis; Ramona White; Duawne Starling	

== Charts ==
=== Weekly charts ===
Chart (1993–1995)	Peak position
US Billboard 200	58
US Top R&B/Hip-Hop Albums (Billboard)	6
US Top Gospel Albums (Billboard)	1

=== Year-end charts ===
Chart (1995)	Position
US Billboard 200	192
US Top R&B/Hip-Hop Albums (Billboard)	16

== Certifications ==
The album was certified Platinum on November 14, 1995.

== Personnel ==
=== Vocalists ===
- David Mann
- Elder Jonathan Drummond
- Dalon Collins
- Byron Cole
- Minister Darrell Blair
- Tommy Colter
- Duawne Starling
- Sheila Brice
- Ramona White
- Nelda Washington
- Terri Pace
- Carrie Young-Davis "Mousie"
- Kesha Grandy
- Tamela Mann
- Jeannette Williams
- Demetrius "Dee" Hereford
- Yolanda McDonald
- Teresa Young
- Cassandra Cleveland-Robertson

=== Musicians ===
- Jerome Allen - bass
- Eric Morgan - drums
- Jerome Harmon, Bobby Sparks - keyboards
- Anthony Thomas - bandleader

== Awards ==
The album won a GMA Dove Award for Traditional Gospel Album of the Year at the 24th GMA Dove Awards in 1993.
