= God's Property =

American gospel choir

- Origin: Dallas, Texas, U.S.
- Genres: Gospel
- Years active: 1993–2003
- Members

God's Property was a gospel choir known for its collaborations with Kirk Franklin, and other recording artists.

== Music career ==
In 1992, God's Property Choir was organized and founded by Linda Ray Hall-Searight, a public school music teacher in Dallas, Texas. She and her son, Grammy Awards winner Robert Sput Searight, and daughters Robin and Rachella Searight, were responsible for recruiting all of the original singers and musicians of this choir. Linda Searight groomed the choir into an exceptional performing organization, that was often featured on national television shows in the mid and late 1990s. The choir began to collaborate with Kirk Franklin in 1994, and sang backup on his 1995 album, Whatcha Looking' 4. Franklin, produced and co-wrote most of the songs on the group's 1997 album (also produced by Scott "Shavoni" Parker and Buster & Kevin Bond). Kirk Franklin often worked out new material with the choir in the studio, and appeared with the choir on the Late Show with David Letterman. The choir has performed with Celine Dion at the encore of the "Call The Man/Power of the Dream" concert in Dallas, and on The 10th Annual Essence Awards in 1997 with Stevie Wonder. In 1998, a few of God's Property singers performed a few songs for Kirk Franklin's The Nu Nation Project.

On November 2, 1998, God's Property sued their record label. The lawsuit, filed in Los Angeles superior court, alleges that Franklin's parent label executives Vickie Mack induced God's Property founder Linda Searight into signing an "onerous and one-sided" contract with B-Rite Music.

In 2013, the group reunited with Franklin for a live performance.

== Albums ==
The choir's May 27, 1997 album, God's Property from Kirk Franklin's Nu Nation with Franklin, won the NAACP Image Award for Outstanding Gospel Artist, the NAACP Image Award for Outstanding Music Video, the Soul Train Music Award for Best Gospel Album and the Grammy Award for Best Gospel Choir or Chorus Album in 1997. The album, driven by the radio hit "Stomp", sold at least 2.7 million copies and was on the Billboard's gospel chart for at least 71 weeks. "Stomp" made it onto the following charts: Hot 100 Airplay, R&B/Hip-Hop Airplay, Hot R&B/Hip-Hop Recurrent Airplay, Rhythmic Top 40, and Mainstream Top 40. To date, the album is the highest-charting gospel album in history.
