= Soul Train Music Award for Best Gospel Album =

Annual US music award

This page lists the winners and nominees for the Soul Train Music Award for Best Gospel Album. The award was first given during the 1989 ceremony, after the categories honoring solo albums and group albums were combined. The category was retired after the 2007 ceremony.

== Winners and nominees ==
Winners are listed first and highlighted in bold.

=== 1980s ===
Year	Artist	Single	Ref
1989
1989	**Take 6**	**Take 6**	
1989	Shirley Caesar	Live in Chicago	
1989	The Clark Sisters	Conqueror	
1989	James Cleveland	Inspired	

=== 1990s ===
Year	Artist	Single	Ref
1990
1990	**BeBe & CeCe Winans**	**Heaven**	
1990	Al Green	I Get Joy	
1990	Mississippi Mass Choir	Mississippi Mass Choir Live	
1990	The Winans	Live at Carnegie Hall	
1991
1991	**The Winans**	**Return**	
1991	Commissioned	State of Mind	
1991	Tramaine Hawkins	Live	
1991	Take 6	So Much to Say	
1992
1992	**BeBe & CeCe Winans**	**Different Lifestyles**	
1992	Reverend James Cleveland and the L.A. Gospel Messengers	Reverend James Cleveland and the L.A. Gospel Messengers	
1992	The Rance Allen Group	Phenomenon	
1992	Sounds of Blackness	Evolution of Gospel	
1993
1993	**Shirley Caesar**	**He's Working It Out for You**	
1993	Milton Brunson and The Thompson Community Singers	My Mind is Made Up	
1993	Commissioned	Number 7	
1993	John P. Kee and the New Life Choir	We Walk By Faith	
1994
1994	**Mississippi Mass Choir**	**It Remains to Be Seen**	
1994	Shirley Caesar	Stand Still	
1994	Kirk Franklin and the Family	Kirk Franklin and the Family	
1994	The Winans	All Out	
1995
1995	**Sounds of Blackness**	**Africa to America: The Journey of the Drum**	
1995	Helen Baylor	The Live Experience	
1995	Hezekiah Walker & the Fellowship Crusade Choir	Live in Atlanta at Morehouse College	
1995	BeBe & CeCe Winans	Relationships	
1996
1996	**The New Life Community Choir Featuring John P. Kee**	**Show Up**	
1996	Yolanda Adams	More Than a Melody	
1996	Shirley Caesar	He Will Come	
1996	Kirk Franklin and the Family	Kirk Franklin and the Family	
1997
1997	**Kirk Franklin**	**Whatcha Lookin' 4**	
1997	Rev. Clay Evans	I've Got a Testimony	
1997	Dottie Peoples and the Peoples Choice Chorale	Count on God	
1997	The Williams Sisters	Live on the East Coast	
1998
1998	**Kirk Franklin and God's Property**	**God's Property from Kirk Franklin's Nu Nation**	
1998	The Canton Spirituals	Living the Dream: Live from Washington, D.C.	
1998	GMWA Gospel Announcers Guild	So You Would Know	
1998	The Williams Brothers	Still Standing	
1999
1999	**Kirk Franklin**	**The Nu Nation Project**	
1999	Ronnie Bryant and the Christian Community Choir	He's a Keepa	
1999	Fred Hammond	Pages of Life - Chapters I & II	
1999	Walter Hawkins and the Love Center Choir	Love Alive V: 25th Anniversary Reunion	

=== 2000s ===
Year	Artist	Single	Ref
2000
2000	**Dottie Peoples**	**God Can & God Will**	
2000	Dorothy Norwood	The Lord is a Wonder	
2000	Richard Smallwood	Healing: Live in Detroit	
2000	Vickie Winans	Live in Detroit, Vol. 2	
2001
2001	**Mary Mary**	**Thankful**	
2001	Chester D.T. Baldwin and Music Ministry Mass	Sing It on Sunday Morning!	
2001	Mississippi Mass Choir	Emmanuel (God With Us)	
2001	Lee Williams and the Spiritual QC's	Good Time	
2002
2002	**Donnie McClurkin**	**Live in London**	
2002	Yolanda Adams	The Experience	
2002	Kim Burrell	Live in Concert	
2002	Doug and Melvin Williams	Duets	
2003
2003	**Kirk Franklin**	**The Rebirth of Kirk Franklin**	
2003	The Canton Spirituals	Walking By Faith	
2003	Donald Lawrence and The Tri City Singers	Go Get Your Life Back	
2003	Hezekiah Walker and the Love Fellowship Crusade Choir	Family Affair II: Live at Radio City Music Hall	
2004
2004	**Byron Cage**	**The Prince of Praise (Live at New Birth Cathedral)**	
2004	Donnie McClurkin	Donnie McClurkin... Again	
2004	Marvin Sapp	Diary of a Psalmist	
2004	Vickie Winans	Bringing it All Together	
2005
2005	**Israel and New Breed**	**Live From Another Level**	
2005	Karen Clark-Sheard	The Heavens Are Telling	
2005	J Moss	The J Moss Project	
2005	Kierra "Kiki" Sheard	I Owe You	
2006
2006	**Donnie McClurkin**	**Psalms, Hymns & Spiritual Songs**	
2006	Kurt Carr Project	One Church	
2006	Kirk Franklin	Hero	
2006	CeCe Winans	Purified	
2007
2007	**Kirk Franklin**	**Songs from the Storm, Volume I**	
2007	The Caravans	Paved the Way	
2007	Bishop G.E. Patterson & Congregation	Singing the Old Time Way, Volume II	
2007	Youth for Christ	The Struggle is Over	

== See also ==
- Soul Train Music Award for Best Gospel Album – Group or Band
- Soul Train Music Award for Best Gospel Album – Solo
