= Grammy Award for Best Contemporary R&B Gospel Album =

1991–2011 honor presented at the Grammy Awards

- Awarded for: Outstanding gospel albums incorporating contemporary R&B music
- Country: United States
- Presented by: National Academy of Recording Arts and Sciences
- First award: 1991
- Final award: 2011
- Website: grammy.com

The Grammy Award for Best Contemporary R&B Gospel Album was an honor presented at the Grammy Awards, a ceremony that was established in 1958 and originally called the Gramophone Awards, to recording artists for quality gospel albums incorporating contemporary R&B music. Honors in several categories are presented at the ceremony annually by the National Academy of Recording Arts and Sciences of the United States to "honor artistic achievement, technical proficiency and overall excellence in the recording industry, without regard to album sales or chart position." In 1991, the award originated as Best Contemporary Soul Gospel Album, and renamed in 2007. Previously, a similar award, the Grammy Award for Best Soul Gospel Performance, Contemporary, was given from 1978 to 1983.

According to the category description guide for the 52nd Grammy Awards, the award is presented to "a newly recorded album with at least fifty-one percent R&B Gospel vocal tracks. A solo artist with a choir or chorus is eligible when the choir/chorus provides backing on what is considered an album for the solo artist."

The award was discontinued in 2012 in a major overhaul of Grammy categories. From 2012 forward, recordings in this category have been shifted to the Best Gospel Album category.

== Recipients ==
Years reflect the year in which the Grammy Awards were presented, for works released in the previous year.

Year^{[I]}	Performing artists	Work	Nominees	Ref.
1991	Take 6	So Much 2 Say	The Winans – Return; The Richard Smallwood Singers – Portrait; Edwin Hawkins – Face to Face; Daryl Coley – He's Right On Time/Live from Los Angeles	
1992	BeBe & CeCe Winans	Different Lifestyles	Helen Baylor – Look a Little Closer; Witness - Mean What You Say; The Rance Allen Group – Phenomenon; Ricky Dillard's New Generation Chorale – The Promise	
1993	Mervyn Warren (producer) & Various Artists	Handel's Messiah: A Soulful Celebration	Daryl Coley – When the Music Stops; Al Green – Love is Reality; The Richard Smallwood Singers – Testimony; Vickie Winans – The Lady	
1994	The Winans	All Out	Vanessa Bell Armstrong – Something on the Inside; The Richard Smallwood Singers – Live; Helen Baylor – Start All Over; Angie & Debbie – Angie and Debbie	
1995	Take 6	Join the Band	Yolanda Adams – Save the World; Helen Baylor – The Live Experience; Commissioned – Matters of the Heart; Tramaine Hawkins – To a Higher Place	
1996	CeCe Winans	Alone In His Presence	Yolanda Adams – More Than a Melody; Anointed – The Call; Various Artists – Motown Comes Home; Doug Williams – Heartsongs	
1997	Kirk Franklin & the Family	Whatcha Lookin' 4	Yolanda Adams – Live in Washington; Helen Baylor – Love Brought Me Back; Hezekiah Walker, Yolanda Adams and Fred Hammond – Shakin' the House...Live In L.A.; The Winans – Heart & Soul	
1998	Take 6	Brothers	Oleta Adams – Come Walk With Me; Andrae Crouch – Pray; Donnie McClurkin – Donnie McClurkin; Marvin Sapp – Grace And Mercy	
1999	Kirk Franklin	The Nu Nation Project	Yolanda Adams – Songs From The Heart; Karen Clark-Sheard – Finally Karen; Fred Hammond & Radical For Christ – Pages Of Life - Chapters I & II; CeCe Winans – Everlasting Love	
2000	Yolanda Adams	Mountain High... Valley Low	Gladys Knight – Many Different Roads; Take 6 – So Cool; Winans Phase 2 – We Got Next; CeCe Winans – His Gift	
2001	Mary Mary & Warryn Campbell (producer)	Thankful	Fred Hammond & Radical For Christ - Purpose By Design; Hezekiah Walker & The Love Fellowship Crusade Choir – Family Affair; BeBe Winans – Love & Freedom; CeCe Winans – Alabaster Box	
2002	Yolanda Adams; Benjamin J. Arrindell, Biff Dawes, Derek Lewis (engineers)	The Experience	Fred Hammond – In Case You Missed It And Then Some; Tramaine Hawkins – Still Tramaine; Angie Winans – Melodies from the Heart; Kim Burrell – Live In Concert	
2003	Eartha	Sidebars	Fred Hammond – Speak Those Things: POL Chapter 3; BeBe Winans – Live and Up Close; Deitrick Haddon – Lost and Found; Commissioned – The Commissioned Reunion Live	
2004	Donnie McClurkin	...Again	T. D. Jakes & Various Artists – Follow The Star; Ann Nesby – Make Me Better; Kirk Whalum – The Gospel According To Jazz Chapter II; Vickie Winans – Bringing It All Together	
2005	Smokie Norful	Nothing Without You	Tonéx & The Peculiar People – Out the Box; Israel and New Breed – Live From Another Level; Various Artists – Bishop T. D. Jakes Presents He-Motions; Fred Hammond – Somethin' 'Bout Love	
2006	CeCe Winans	Purified	Yolanda Adams – Day By Day; Mary Mary – Mary Mary; J. Moss – The J.Moss Project; BeBe Winans – Dream	
2007	Kirk Franklin	Hero	Myron Butler & Levi – Set Me Free; Israel and New Breed – A Timeless Christmas; Kierra Sheard – This Is Me; Tye Tribbett & G.A. – Victory Live!	
2008	Fred Hammond	Free to Worship	Coko – Grateful; J. Moss – V2; Trin-i-Tee 5:7 – T57; Marvin Winans – Alone But Not Alone	
2009	Kirk Franklin	The Fight of My Life	Jason Champion – Reflections; Mary Mary – The Sound; The Murrills – Donald Lawrence Introduces: Family Prayer; Tye Tribbett & G.A. – Stand Out	
2010	Heather Headley	Audience of One	Sheri Jones-Moffett – Renewed; J. Moss – Just James; Smokie Norful – Smokie Norful: Live; Kierra Sheard – Bold Right Life	
2011	BeBe & CeCe Winans	Still	Forever Jones – Get Ready; Fred Hammond – Love Unstoppable; VaShawn Mitchell – Triumphant; Aaron Sledge – Aaron Sledge	

^{^[I]} Each year is linked to the article about the Grammy Awards held that year.

== Record holders ==
- Most Wins

Rank	1st	2nd	3rd
Artist	Kirk Franklin; Cece Winans	Take 6	Yolanda Adams
Total Wins	4 wins	3 wins	2 wins

- Most Nominations

Rank	1st	2nd	3rd	4th	5th
Artist	Yolanda Adams	Fred Hammond	Cece Winans	Kirk Franklin; Take 6 Helen Baylor	Mary Mary; Bebe Winans; The Winans; Richard Smallwood
Total Wins	8 nominations	7 nominations	5 nominations	4 nominations	3 nominations

== See also ==
- Grammy Award for Best Gospel Album
- Grammy Award for Best Rock Gospel Album
- List of Grammy Award categories
