= Rap or Go to the League =

Studio album by 2 Chainz
- Released: March 1, 2019
- Recorded: 2017–19
- Genre: Hip hop
- Length: 55:00
- Labels: Gamebread; T.R.U.; Def Jam
- Producers: 2 Chainz (exec.); LeBron James (exec.); 30 Roc; 9th Wonder; Anthony Evans; ATL Jacob; B Clark; Buddah Bless; Cardiak; Cardo; Da Honorable C.N.O.T.E.; Datboisqueeze; Dem Jointz; Dez Wright; FKi 1st; GYLTTRYP; Hitmaka; Jabz; Mike Dean; Mike WiLL Made-It; Mustard; N.O. Joe; Paul Cabbin; Pharrell Williams; Rob Holladay; Terrace Martin; WondaGurl

2 Chainz chronology
The Play Don't Care Who Makes It (2018)	Rap or Go to the League (2019)	No Face No Case (2020)

Singles from Rap Or Go To The League
- 1. "Girl's Best Friend" Released: November 18, 2018; 2. "Rule the World" Released: March 19, 2019

Rap or Go to the League is the fifth studio album by American rapper 2 Chainz. It was released on March 1, 2019, through Gamebread, The Real University (T.R.U.), and Def Jam Recordings. The production on the album was handled by multiple producers, including 9th Wonder, Da Honorable C.N.O.T.E., Mike Dean, Mustard, Pharrell Williams, Terrace Martin, and WondaGurl, among others. LeBron James also served as executive producer. The album features guest appearances by Young Thug, Travis Scott, Kendrick Lamar, Ariana Grande, Ty Dolla Sign, Lil Wayne, Kodak Black and others.

Rap or Go to the League was supported by two singles: "Girl's Best Friend" and "Rule the World". The album received widespread critical praise from music critics and was a commercial success. It debuted at number four on the US Billboard 200 chart, earning 65,000 album-equivalent units in its first week.

== Background ==
In February 2018, 2 Chainz released the EP The Play Don't Care Who Makes It and soon after announced that his next album would be titled Rap or Go to the League.

In February 2019, it was revealed that Los Angeles Lakers small forward LeBron James would executive produce the album. The album cover was later revealed.

A Def Jam press release said the intent of the album is "celebrating black excellence and focusing on the power of education and entrepreneurship." The press release also says the title "challenges the notion that the only way out of the inner city is either to become a rapper or a ball player".

On February 28, 2019, the official tracklist was revealed.

== Promotion ==
In November 2018, the song "Girl's Best Friend", featuring American artist Ty Dolla Sign, was released as a double single with the song "Hot Wings" as "Hot Wings Are a Girl's Best Friend". The music video for "Rule the World" featuring American singer Ariana Grande was released on March 11, 2019, and it then became the album's second single eight days later, on March 19.

== Critical reception ==
Professional ratings
Aggregate scores
Source	Rating
Metacritic	82/100
Review scores
Source	Rating
AllMusic	4/5 stars
Consequence of Sound	B+
Exclaim!	8/10
HipHopDX	3.9/5
NME	4/5 stars
Pitchfork	7.6/10
The 405	8/10

Rap or Go to the League received critical acclaim from critics. At Metacritic, which assigns a weighted mean rating out of 100 to reviews from mainstream publications, the album received a score of 82, based on 8 reviews. Sheldon Pierce of Pitchfork called the album his most cogent and organized album by far, and his most thoughtful one and stated that "the album is proposed as the rapper’s rejection of the very premise in the title, and in asides and outros he does occasionally question this bifurcation of black liberation, but the music mostly tracks his own path to prosperity through a minefield." He also stated that "As he provides more context for his story than ever, he rewrites the rule book on winning, opening up about his life as certified dealer to rap stars, critiquing the broken collegiate athletics apparatus, and warring against Uncle Sam." Thomas Hobbs of NME gave the album four stars. Hobbs praises 2 Chainz' growth as an artist stating "But even though 2 Chainz has been prolific as a guest rapper, he’s yet to release the kind of classic solo album that will truly solidify his status as a top-tier rapper. This is something he’s hoping to change with ‘Rap Or Go To The League’, a record that suggests that his talent is finally starting to catch up with all his hard work."

== Commercial performance ==
Rap or Go to the League debuted at number four on the US Billboard 200 chart, earning 65,000 album-equivalent units (including 13,000 copies as pure album sales) in its first week. This became 2 Chainz' fifth consecutive US top-ten album on the chart. The album also debuted at number one on the US Top R&B/Hip-Hop Albums chart, becoming his third album to top the chart. In its second week, the album dropped to number 14 on the chart, earning an additional 26,000 units.

== Track listing ==
Credits adapted from Tidal, album's liner notes and Instagram.

No.	Title	Writer(s)	Producer(s)	Length
1.	"Forgiven" (featuring Marsha Ambrosius)	Tauheed Epps; Marsha Ambrosius; Dwayne Abernathy, Jr.; Shawn Carter; Hugh Perry; Maxwell Smith; Kanye West	Dem Jointz	5:23
2.	"Threat 2 Society"	Epps; Patrick Douthit; Douglas Williams; Leonard Williams; Melvin Williams	9th Wonder	3:46
3.	"Money in the Way"	Epps; Tyron Douglas; Bruce Hawes; Joseph Jefferson	Buddah Bless; Jabz	2:42
4.	"Statute of Limitations"	Epps; Samuel Gloade; Michael Williams II; Sammie Norris; James Phillips; Todd Shaw; Jonathan Smith; Phalon Alexander	30 Roc; Mike WiLL Made-It^{[d]}	2:29
5.	"High Top Versace" (featuring Young Thug)	Epps; Jeffery Williams; Jacob Canady	ATL Jacob	2:57
6.	"Whip" (featuring Travis Scott)	Epps; Jacques Webster II; Mike Dean; Ebony Oshunrinde	Dean; WondaGurl^{[a]}	3:47
7.	"NCAA"	Epps; Carlton Mays, Jr.	Da Honorable C.N.O.T.E.	4:08
8.	"Momma I Hit a Lick" (featuring Kendrick Lamar)	Epps; Kendrick Duckworth; Pharrell Williams	P. Williams	2:54
9.	"Rule the World" (featuring Ariana Grande)	Epps; Ariana Grande; Carl McCormick; Christian Ward; Robert Watson; Racquelle Anteola; Moore Ray III; Lerron Carson; Richard Harrison	Cardiak; Paul Cabbin; Hitmaka; Rob Holladay^{[b]}	4:06
10.	"Girl's Best Friend" (featuring Ty Dolla Sign)	Epps; Tyrone Griffin, Jr.; Ronald LaTour; Dylan Cleary-Krell; Brock Korsan	Cardo; Dez Wright^{[a]}	3:13
11.	"2 Dollar Bill" (featuring Lil Wayne and E-40)	Epps; Dwayne Carter, Jr.; Earl Stevens; Dijon McFarlane; Terrace Martin	Mustard; Martin^{[b]}; GYLTTRYP^{[d]}; Anthony Evans^{[c]}	4:00
12.	"I Said Me"	Epps; Gloade; Adarius Moragne; Lonnie Smith; Oscar Hammerstein II; Richard Rodgers	30 Roc; Datboisqueeze	5:32
13.	"I'm Not Crazy, Life Is" (featuring Chance the Rapper and Kodak Black)	Epps; Chancelor Bennett; Bill Kapri; Trocon Roberts; Dean	FKi 1st; Dean^{[b]}	5:30
14.	"Sam"	Epps; Chad Butler; Bernard Freeman; Joseph Johnson	B Clark N.O. Joe	4:11
Total length:				55:00

Notes

- ^{^[a]} signifies a co-producer
- ^{^[b]} signifies an additional producer
- ^{^[c]} signifies a vocal producer
- ^{^[d]} signifies an uncredited co-producer
- "Forgiven" features additional vocals from Sunni Patterson and Francis and the Lights
- "2 Dollar Bill" features background vocals from Anthony Evans, Chelsea "Peaches" West, Denise Carite and Tiffany Palmer
- "I'm Not Crazy, Life Is" features background vocals from Joi
- "Sam" features additional vocals from B Clark

Sample credits

- "Forgiven" contains elements of "Lucifer", written by Shawn Carter, Kanye West, Hugh Perry, and Maxwell Smith, and performed by Jay-Z.
- "Threat 2 Society" contains a sample of "So Good to Be Alive", written by Douglas Williams, Leonard Williams, and Melvin Williams, and performed by The Truthettes.
- "Money in the Way" contains a sample of "Can't You See What You're Doing to Me", written and performed by The Three Degrees.
- "Statue of Limitations" contains a sample of "Couldn't Be a Better Player", written by Lil Jon & The Eastside Boyz featuring Too $hort.
- "Rule the World" contains a sample of "Why Don't We Fall in Love", written by Richard Harrison, and performed by Amerie.
- "2 Dollar Bill" contains an interpolation of "Phone Home", written by Dwayne Carter, Eddie Montilla, Andre Lyon and Marcelo Valenzano.
- "I Said Me" contains a sample of "My Favorite Things", written by Oscar Hammerstein II and Richard Rodgers, and performed by Mary J. Blige; and a sample of "A Garden of Peace", written and performed by Lonnie Liston-Smith.

== Personnel ==
Credits adapted from Tidal and album's liner notes.

Instrumentation

- Philip Cornish – additional keyboards (track 9)(track 1)
- Tyler Cates – guitar (track 7)
- Blair Taylor – additional keyboards

Technical

- Zach Steele – recording (track 1)
- Bainz – recording (track 5)
- Nolan Presley – recording (track 2–14)
- Billy Hickey – recording (track 9)
- Migui Maloles – recording (track 11)
- Francisco "Frankie" Ramirez – recording (track 11)
- Dem Jointz – mixing (track 1)
- Finis "KY" White – mixing (track 1–5, 7–14), recording (track 1)
- Alex Tumay – mixing (track 5)
- Mike Dean – mixing (track 6)
- Serban Ghenea – mixing (track 9)
- Glenn Schick – mastering (all tracks)

== Charts ==
=== Weekly charts ===
Chart (2019)	Peak position
Australian Albums (ARIA)	35
Belgian Albums (Ultratop Flanders)	94
Canadian Albums (Billboard)	10
Dutch Albums (Album Top 100)	32
French Albums (SNEP)	117
Irish Albums (IRMA)	68
Latvian Albums (LAIPA)	20
Lithuanian Albums (AGATA)	19
New Zealand Albums (RMNZ)	37
Norwegian Albums (VG-lista)	30
Swiss Albums (Schweizer Hitparade)	47
UK Albums (Official Charts)	74
US Billboard 200	4
US Top R&B/Hip-Hop Albums (Billboard)	1

=== Year-end charts ===
Chart (2019)	Position
US Top R&B/Hip-Hop Albums (Billboard)	87
