= Soul Train Music Award for Best Gospel Album – Group or Band =

Annual US music award

This page lists the winners and nominees for the Soul Train Music Award for Best Gospel Album – Group or Band. The award was only given out during the first two ceremonies, before being retired in 1989. The Winans are the only group to ever win this award.

== Winners and nominees ==
Winners are listed first and highlighted in bold.

=== 1980s ===
Year	Artist	Album	Ref
1987
1987	**The Winans**	**Let My People Go**	
1987	Aretha Franklin with James Cleveland and the Southern California Community Choir	Amazing Grace	
1987	Various Artists	The Color Purple Original Motion Picture Soundtrack	
1987	The Williams Brothers	Blessed	
1988
1988	**The Winans**	**Decisions**	
1988	Reverend Milton Brunson and The Thompson Community Singers	If I Be Lifted	
1988	Commissioned	Go Tell Somebody	
1988	The Clark Sisters	Heart and Soul	

== See also ==
- Soul Train Music Award for Best Gospel Album
- Soul Train Music Award for Best Gospel Album – Solo
