= Will You Be Ready? =

Studio album by Commissioned
- Released: December 13, 1988
- Studio: Studio A (Dearborn Heights, Michigan); Billy Meadows Studio (Detroit, Michigan)
- Genre: Gospel music
- Length: 49:11
- Label: Light Records
- Producer: Michael Brooks; Fred Hammond

Commissioned chronology
On the Winning Side (1987)	Will You Be Ready? (1988)	Ordinary Just Won't Do (1989)

Professional ratings
Review scores
Source	Rating
AllMusic	3/5 stars
MusicHound R&B: The Essential Album Guide	2.5/5 stars

Will You Be Ready? is the fourth album by the American contemporary gospel music group Commissioned, released in 1988. The album was nominated for a Grammy. It won a GMA Dove Award.

The album peaked at number 6 on the US Billboard Top Gospel albums chart and number 22 on the Billboard Top Contemporary Christian chart.

== Track listing ==
1. "So Good to Know (The Savior)" (Michael Brooks) – 4:41
2. "Waiting to Hear from You" (Brooks) – 4:55
3. "Don't Worry" (Eric Brice, Parks Stewart) – 4:42
4. "Save Me Now" (Fred Hammond) – 5:15
5. "Will You Be Ready?" (Brooks) – 6:56
6. "Lord Jesus Help Me (Help Somebody Else)" (Mitchell Jones) – 4:35
7. "Let's Not Crucify Him Again" (Brooks) – 3:56
8. "More Than You'll Ever Know" (Brooks) – 4:48
9. "Take Your Burdens (To the Lord)" (Stewart, Earl J. Wright) – 3:42
10. "A Praise for You" (Brooks) – 5:39

== Personnel ==
Commissioned

- Fred Hammond – lead and backing vocals, bass guitar, drum programming
- Mitchell Jones – lead and backing vocals
- Karl Reid – lead and backing vocals
- Keith Staten – lead and backing vocals
- Michael Brooks – keyboards, Synclavier, drum programming
- Michael Williams – Synclavier, acoustic drums, electric drums, drum programming

Additional Musicians

- Earl Wright, Jr. – keyboards
- Eric Brice – keyboards, guitars
- John Jaszcz – Synclavier programming
- Randy Poole – Synclavier programming
- Michael J. Powell – guitars
- Mario Resto – guitars
- Dave McMurray – saxophone solos
- Byron Cage – backing vocals
- Sharon Page – backing vocals
- Parkes Stewart – backing vocals
- Witness – backing vocals
- Commissioned Community Choir – various singers

=== Production ===
- Alan Abrahams – executive producer
- Michael Brooks – producer
- Fred Hammond – producer
- Mitchell Jones – associate producer
- Karl Reid – associate producer
- Keith Staten – associate producer
- Michael Williams – associate producer, production assistant
- John Jaszcz – engineer, mix engineer
- Randy Poole – engineer
- Chris Tabor – assistant engineer
- Ray Hammond – production assistant
- Monica Barker – production coordinator
- Ameen Howrani – photography
- Bryant + Associates – design
- John McDaniels – hair stylist
- D.C.D Management – management
