= I Am Persuaded =

Studio album by Fred Hammond
- Released: May 28, 1991
- Recorded: 1990–1991
- Genre: CCM; contemporary gospel; R&B; soul
- Length: 46:01
- Label: Verity, Benson
- Producer: Fred Hammond, Eric Brice, Dan Clearly

Fred Hammond chronology
I Am Persuaded (1991)	Deliverance (1993)

I Am Persuaded is the debut studio album from gospel singer Fred Hammond. It is Hammond's first album as a solo artist, recorded while still a member of the popular gospel group Commissioned. The album was released on May 28, 1991, through Verity Records and Benson Records. The album contains a distinct early 1990s sound, and combines uptempo R&B, soul and new jack swing musical elements with its core gospel sound.

== Chart performance ==
The album peaked at No. 11 on Billboard's Top Gospel Albums chart on September 7, 1991. It remained on the chart for 29 weeks.

== Track listing ==
1. "I Am Persuaded" (Eric Brice, Fred Hammond) – 5:40
2. "Mender of Broken Hearts" (Fred Hammond, Eddie Howard Jr.) – 5:09
3. "I Came to Jesus As I Was / Grace" (Fred Hammond, Bernard Wright) – 9:47
4. "If It Had Not Been (For the Lord on Our Side)" (Anson Dawkins, Mitchell Jones) – 5:00
5. "Go (A Young Minister's Affirmation)" (Maxx Frank, Fred Hammond) – 4:56
6. "That's What I'll Do to Keep on Lovin' You" (Maxx Frank, Michael Winans, Regina Winans) – 4:49
7. "Wake Up" (Percy Bady, Steve Huff) – 4:07
8. "That Rugged Cross" (Maxx Frank, Fred Hammond) – 2:55
9. "I'm Not Afraid" (Percy Bady) – 3:34

== Personnel ==
Adapted from AllMusic.com.

- Fred Hammond – producer, lead vocals, background vocals, vocal arrangements, bass, drum programming
- Eric Brice – producer
- Dan Clearly – executive producer
- Mitchell Jones – keyboards, vocal arrangements
- Vic Adams – background vocals
- Mike Allen – background vocals
- Lizz Lee – background vocals
- Andre Reamus – background vocals
- Rayse Biggs – horns
- Dana Davis – drums
- Maxx Frank – keyboards, organ
- Mike Williams – drums
- John Jaszcz – engineer
- Eric Morgeson – engineer
- Randy Poole – engineer
- Ben De Biase – assistant engineer
- Raymond Hammond – assistant engineer
- June Arnold – grooming
- Connie Harrington – art direction
- Russ Harrington – photography

== Charts ==
Chart (1991)	Peak position
U.S. Billboard Top Gospel Albums	11
