= Ordinary Just Won't Do =

Studio album by Commissioned
- Released: May 9, 1989
- Studio: Studio A (Dearborn Heights, Michigan); Pre-production at Billy Meadows Studio (Detroit, Michigan)
- Genre: Gospel music
- Length: 42:13
- Label: Light Records
- Producer: Michael Brooks; Fred Hammond

Commissioned chronology
Will You Be Ready? (1989)	Ordinary Just Won't Do (1989)	State Of Mind (1990)

Ordinary Just Won't Do is the fifth album by American contemporary gospel music group Commissioned, released in 1989 on Light Records.

Domestically, the album peaked at number 4 on the US Billboard Top Gospel albums chart and number 28 on the Billboard Top Contemporary Christian chart.

== Track listing ==
1. "Back in the Saddle" (Michael Brooks) – 4:40
2. "Ordinary Just Won't Do" (Mitchell Jones, Parkes Stewart) – 5:08
3. "If My People" (Brooks) – 4:22
4. "Heart of Mine" (Fred Hammond) – 5:13
5. "A Life That Shows" (Hammond) – 4:18
6. "No More Loneliness" (Jones, Stewart) – 4:41
7. "There's No Excuse" (Brooks) – 4:56
8. "It Was You" (Karl Reid) – 3:50
9. "Here I Am (More Than a Conqueror)" (Brooks) – 4:44
10. "There's No Excuse (Reprise)" (Brooks) – 0:53

== Personnel ==
Commissioned

- Fred Hammond – lead and backing vocals, bass guitar, drum programming
- Mitchell Jones – lead and backing vocals
- Karl Reid – lead and backing vocals
- Keith Staten – lead and backing vocals
- Michael Brooks – keyboards, Synclavier, drum programming
- Michael Williams – drums, electric drums, drum programming

Additional Musicians

- Randy Poole – Synclavier programming
- Eric Brice – lead guitar
- Brad Johnson – guitar solo (4)
- Parkes Stewart – backing vocals

=== Production ===
- Michael Brooks – producer, music and vocal arrangements
- Fred Hammond – producer, music and vocal arrangements, background arrangements
- Mitchell Jones – co-producer, music and vocal arrangements, background arrangements
- Karl Reid – co-producer, music and vocal arrangements
- Keith Staten – co-producer, music and vocal arrangements
- Michael Williams – co-producer, music and vocal arrangements, assistant engineer
- Parkes Stewart – background arrangements
- John Jaszcz – engineer, recording, mixing
- Randy Poole – engineer
- Ray Hammond – production assistant
- Michael Staten – production assistant
- Monica Barker – production coordinator
- Adrian Givens – photography
