= On the Winning Side =

Studio album by Commissioned
- Released: May 19, 1987
- Studio: Studio A (Dearborn Heights, Michigan)
- Genre: Gospel music
- Length: 38:43
- Label: Light Records
- Producer: Michael Brooks; Fred Hammond

Commissioned chronology
Go Tell Somebody (1986)	On the Winning Side (1987)	Will You Be Ready? (1989)

On the Winning Side is the third album by American contemporary gospel music group Commissioned, released in 1987 on Light Records.

Domestically, the album peaked at number 6 on the US Billboard Top Gospel albums chart and number 24 on the Billboard Top Contemporary Christian chart.

== Track listing ==
1. "You Keep on Blessing Me" (Michael Brooks) – 4:14
2. "Strange Land" (Brooks) – 4:16
3. "I'm Gonna Let My Love Flow" (Fred Hammond) – 4:00
4. "You Can Depend on Jesus" (Eric Brice, Parkes Stewart) – 3:54
5. "Only What You Do for Jesus Christ Will Last" (Mitchell Jones) – 4:44
6. "What Will You Say?" (Hammond) – 4:56
7. "When Jesus Sings" (Hammond) – 5:04
8. "Perilous Times" (Hammond) – 3:59
9. "Jesus Cares" (Brooks) – 4:03

== Personnel ==
Commissioned

- Fred Hammond – lead and backing vocals, bass, drum machine programming
- Mitchell Jones – lead and backing vocals
- Karl Reid – lead and backing vocals
- Keith Staten – lead and backing vocals
- Michael Brooks – all keyboards, Synclavier
- Michael Williams – drums, cymbal overdubs

Additional Musicians

- Earl J. Wright – synthesizers
- Eric Brice – guitars
- Michael Wright – guitars
- Larry Fertangelo – percussion
- Parks Stewart – backing vocals

Crowd scene on "Perilous Times"

- Kenny Brown, Raymond Hammond, Carolyn Hudson, Harold McCord and Donna Sersie

=== Production ===
- Alan Abrahams – executive producer
- Michael Brooks – producer, music and vocal arrangements, assistant engineer
- Fred Hammond – producer, music and vocal arrangements
- Mitchell Jones – associate producer
- Karl Reid – associate producer
- Keith Staten – associate producer
- Michael Williams – associate producer, production assistant
- John Jaszcz – engineer
- Randy Poole – assistant engineer
- Peter Prout – assistant engineer
- Ray Hammond – production assistant
- The Christopher Group – concept, design
- Teresa Pratt – designer
- Ameen Howrani – photography
- John McDaniels – hair stylist
- D.C.D Management – management
