= Irreplaceable Love =

Studio album by Commissioned
- Released: March 1, 1996
- Studio: Scrimshaw Sound (Nashville, Tennessee); Hinge Sound (Chicago, Illinois); Stone Creek Studios (Gladwyne, Pennsylvania); Studio A (Dearborn Heights, Michigan); Sunrise Studios (Detroit, Michigan)
- Genre: Gospel music
- Length: 52:11
- Label: Verity Records
- Producer: Mitchell Jones; Dana Davis; Maxx Frank; Steve Grissette; Wanya Morris; Shawn Stockman

Commissioned chronology
Matters of the Heart (1994)	Irreplaceable Love (1996)	Time and Seasons (1999)

Irreplaceable Love is the ninth album by American contemporary gospel music group Commissioned, released on March 1, 1996 via Verity Records. It was the last album with Marvin Sapp.

Domestically, the album peaked at number 3 on the US Billboard Top Gospel albums chart, number 9 on the Billboard Top Contemporary Christian chart and number 19 on the Billboard Top Heatseekers chart.

== Track listing ==
1. "Opening Meditation" (Maxx Frank) – 0:40
2. "Dominion" (Gary Crawford, Dana Davis, Mitchell Jones) – 4:15
3. "Breakin' Away" (Maxx Frank, Steve Grissette) – 4:51
4. "Until My Change Comes" (Montrell Darrett) – 4:43
5. "Do You Still Love Me" (Frank, Grissette) – 4:57
6. "They Must Know" (Dorothy Thornton, Wanya Morris) – 4:34
7. "More Than I (Interlude)" (Jones, Mark Luckey) – 1:06
8. "Irreplaceable Love" (Shawn Stockman) – 4:11
9. "No Weapon" (Darrett, Jones, Perry Michael Allen) – 5:25
10. "I Can Love Again" (Darrett, Jones, Jeff Walker) – 5:12
11. "More Than I" (Jones, Luckey) – 5:11
12. "Crucified with Christ" (Frank, Grissette) – 6:20
13. "Closing Meditation" (Frank) – 0:46

== Personnel ==
Commissioned

- Mitchell Jones – lead vocals (2–4, 9, 11, 12), backing vocals (2–4, 9–12), vocal arrangements (2, 4, 9–11), vocals (5, 6, 8), keyboards (7, 11)
- Karl Reid – backing vocals (2–4, 9–12), vocals (5, 6, 8), lead vocals (10–12)
- Marvin Sapp – lead vocals (2–4, 9–12), backing vocals (2–4, 9–12), BGV arrangements (3), vocals (5, 6, 8)
- Montrell Darrett – lead vocals (2, 4, 9–11), backing vocals (2–4, 9–12), rap intro (3), vocal arrangements (4, 10), vocals (5, 6, 8)
- Maxx Frank – organ (2, 4, 13), keyboards (3, 5, 7, 12), Rhodes electric piano (3), BGV arrangements (3), arrangements (4), programming (6), acoustic piano (11)

Additional musicians

- Nathan DiGesare – programming (6)
- Tom Howard – acoustic piano (6), programming (6)
- Wanya Morris – programming (6)
- Shawn Stockman – programming (8)
- Jeff Walker – additional keyboards (11)
- Derrick Buckingham – guitars (2–4)
- George Cocchini – guitars (5)
- David Cleveland – acoustic guitar (6)
- Tim Bowman – acoustic guitar (11)
- Tony "Downtown" Brown – bass (3)
- Al Turner – bass (11)
- Nathan Maxwell – bass (12)
- John Catchings – strings (5, 11)
- David Davidson – strings (5, 11)
- Pamela Sixfin – strings (5, 11)
- Kristin Wilkinson – strings (5, 11)
- Maurice Cretcher – additional strings (11)
- Craig Alea – string arrangements (5)
- Don Hart – string arrangements (11)
- Steve Grissette – BGV arrangements (3)
- Kevin Chandler – radio voice (3)

=== Production ===
- Sherman M. Brown – executive producer
- Nathan DiGesare – executive producer, recording (2, 10)
- Mitchell Jones – producer (2, 4, 9–11)
- Dana Davis – co-producer (2)
- Maxx Frank – producer (3–5, 12)
- Steve Grissette – producer (3, 12)
- Wanya Morris – producer (6)
- Shawn Stockman – producer (8)
- Craig Bauer – mixing (2–5, 12), recording (3–5, 12)
- Jim "Jiff" Hinger – engineer (6, 8)
- Billy Meadows – tracking (9, 10)
- Steve King – engineer (9, 11)
- Neil Gustafson – assistant engineer (3, 5, 12)
- Scott Streiner – assistant engineer (3, 5, 12)
- Marsha Hain – assistant engineer (8)
- Ray Lubrana – assistant engineer (8)
- Steve Capp – assistant engineer (9, 11), engineer (10)
- Todd Fairall – assistant engineer (9, 11), engineer (10)
- Mike Rapp – art direction
- Robert Ascroft – design
- Andrew Eccles – photography
