= List of killings by law enforcement officers in the United States, April 2023 =

This is a list of people reported killed by non-military law enforcement officers in the United States in April 2023, whether in the line of duty or not, and regardless of reason or method. The listing documents the occurrence of a death, making no implications regarding wrongdoing or justification on the part of the person killed or officer involved. Killings are arranged by date of the incident that caused death. Different death dates, if known, are noted in the description. The table below lists 37 people.

== April 2023 ==
Date	Name (age) of deceased	Race	Location	Description
2023-04-30	Nathaniel Naki (40)		Kaunakakai, Hawaii	Naki was allegedly wielding a machete when officers responded, deployed a taser that proved ineffective, and then shot him.
2023-04-28	unidentified adult male (24)		Greeley, Colorado	The male was slain during a shootout with officers
2023-04-28	Buck Laramore (33)		Thermopolis, Wyoming	Laramore was killed in a shootout with Thermopolis Police Department Sgt. Mike Mascorro during his attempt to arrest him for supplying incorrect information during an earlier investigation into drug possession at a separate location. There was no warrant for Laramore's arrest. Mascorro was shot twice during the shootout, but survived. Mascorro was later cleared of the killing, but the breaking into Laramore's home was deemed illegal.
2023-04-28	Yenitza Arroyo Torres (44)	Latino	Fayetteville, North Carolina	A Fayetteville Police officer shot and killed his wife at their home before killing himself.
2023-04-27	Brown, Banko (24)	Black	San Francisco, California	Brown, a transgender man, was shot and killed by a security guard who thought he was shoplifting from Walgreens.
2023-04-27	Chue Feng Yang (33)	Asian	Minneapolis, Minnesota	An FBI agent shot and killed Yang, a 33-year old Asian man, while serving an arrest warrant for him at a home near Dowling and DuPoint avenues in North Minneapolis. According to the FBI, Yang had barricade himself inside the house for several hours and he was holding a firearm when he later emerged from the home.
2023-04-27	Ainsley Popwell Jr (34)	Unknown	Atlanta, Georgia	Officers responded to a 911 call about a person, Popwell. loading a gun. Popwell discharged a weapon and ran away. Then, officers shot him. No officers were injured.
2023-04-24	Christopher Ochs	White	Saint Ignatius, Montana	Lake County Sheriff's deputies were performing a welfare check on Ochs at a home in Saint Ignatius. When they arrived Ochs emerged wielding a large Bowie knife and charged at the officers. The officers shot and killed Ochs. The Montana Department of Criminal Investigation is reviewing the shooting.
2023-04-23	Robernard Benjamin (39)	Unknown	Lithia Springs, Georgia	Officers responded to a 911 call about a domestic dispute. Benjamin had stabbed a woman multiple times. When police arrived, the woman was trying to get away from Benjamin. Benjamin moved toward the woman and the officers while holding a knife, and an officer shot him. He died on the scene, and no officers were injured.
2023-04-19	Henry Najdeski (52)	White	Fort Wayne, Indiana	An officer driving in downtown Fort Wayne struck Najdeski while turning a corner while Najdeski crossed the street. The officer involved had been involved in four previous crashes in a squad car, one of which resulted in a suspension.
2023-04-13	Darryl Fussell (23)	Unknown	Riverdale, Georgia	While responding to a call about two men trespassing inside a medical office undergoing renovation, police tried to convince Fussell to leave the building. Fussell allegedly grabbed a "sharp tool" and was shot to death by police. No officers were injured.
2023-04-12	Zachary Wayne Pace (36)	White	Blackfoot, Idaho	Blackfoot police were searching for Zachary Pace in connection to an eluding, kidnapping, and aggravated assault case. After locating Pace's vehicle at a hotel, Pace lead police in a vehicle chase. The Bingham County Sheriff's Department and Fort Hall police joined the chase. Pace crashed his vehicle on Highway 91. As police approached Pace's vehicle, shots were fired and Pace was struck along with two other passengers in Pace's vehicle. Authorities say Pace was armed at the time of the shooting. Pace was taken to a local hospital where he was pronounced dead.
2023-04-12	Matvey Klimenko	White	Jacksonville, Florida	Klimenko was terrorizing a woman with knife inside a Jacksonville home. She escaped through a bathroom window and called police. When the Jacksonville police arrived, they tried to talk Klimenko out of the home with a bullhorn. After that they deployed a K-9 to apprehend Klimenko. After Klimenko appeared to attack the K-9 with the knife, the police shot and killed him.
2023-04-11	Brandon Zapata (20)	Latino	Fort Worth, Texas	Police were called to a mall by security, including an off-duty officer. Police restrained Zapata, who fell unconscious and died; his death was later ruled a homicide.
2023-04-10	Connor Sturgeon (25)	White	Louisville, Kentucky	Sturgeon shot several people at a bank he formerly worked at, killing five, before being killed by police.
2023-04-09	unidentified adult male		Smithdale, Mississippi	
2023-04-09	Lacorvis Daley (28)	Black	Lafayette, Louisiana	Daley was killed in a police shoot out after he was reported for killing his girlfriend's mother, her child, and his son.
2023-04-09	Deiondre Solomon (28)	Black	Lafayette, Louisiana	Solomon was shot and killed by an off-duty officer working security, shortly after shooting and wounding a man.
2023-04-08	Glenn Perry (50)	White	Cameron, Wisconsin	Perry, with a history of DV offenses, was angry about his divorce and felt he was 'pushed around' by police. During a traffic stop, he shot and killed 2 officers. He then died in a shoot out with police.
2023-04-08	Homea Spencer (44)	Black	Plantation, Florida	After reports of shot fired, police responded to the area where Spencer was. Spencer, with a history of mental illness, was found with a firearm that he pointed at police. They shot and killed him.
2023-04-07	Mark Wadsworth (62)		Edgewater, Florida	Wadsworth was shot following pulling and pointing a gun at responding officers.
2023-04-07	Christian Torrez (18)	Latino	Oxnard, California	Torrez was threatening residents with a 3-inch knife when police responded. They used non-lethal force and commanded Torrez to drop the weapon. He refused and was shot.
2023-04-06	John Wilburn (52)		Madisonville, Tennessee	Tennessee Bureau of Investigation officer Zachary Cochran shot Wilburn at a residence. Investigation and details still pending.
2023-04-06	unidentified adult male		Eugene, Oregon	The family of a highly intoxicated man called police requesting he be taken to a hospital and warned he is combative when intoxicated. When the officers made contact, the male was holding a pellet gun, began charging at the officers and pointing it and was shot.
2023-04-05	unidentified adult male		Houston, Texas	Officers witnessed a man leaving a store quickly and found out it had just been robbed. When they made contact the man had a firearm and refused to comply. He was shot.
2023-04-05	unidentified adult male		Los Angeles, California	A man wanted for murder was hiding out in a truck yard when police attempted to apprehend him. He then attacked a female officer and attempted to wrestle her gun away from her and punched her in the face. She shot the suspect.
2023-04-05	Robert Dotson (52)		Farmington, New Mexico	Police were responding to a domestic violence call at a house around 11:30 p.m., but instead arrived at a house diagonally across the street. Police knocked on the door and announced "Farmington Police" three times, but not loudly. The officers realized they had the wrong address and began backing away from the house, one joking about the mistake. When the officers were about 20 feet away, Dotson, the homeowner, opened the screen door with a handgun held in his right hand beside his waist and the officers shot him several times. Dotson's wife, not initially realizing the people outside her home were police, fired at the officers from the same doorway, allegedly with Dotson's handgun, but put the gun down after realizing they were in fact police officers. Dotson died at the scene. His wife and the police officers were not injured.
2023-04-03	James Corey Donald (45)	White	Laurel, Mississippi	Donald and an off-duty sheriff's deputy got into an argument at a church, where the deputy was volunteering as a security guard. According to authorities, the deputy chased Donald into the parking lot before shooting him in the back. The deputy was charged with second-degree murder.
2023-04-03	Brandon Harris (19)		Colorado Springs, Colorado	Harris was wanted for grand theft auto and police went on a chase with him. He fled the vehicle and went into a Burlington Coat Factory where he fire off at least one round at officers. They returned fire, killing him.
2023-04-02	Jose Luis Hernandez (66)	Hispanic	Livingston, Texas	Hernandez pointed a gun at officers. He was shot by first responders.
2023-04-03	Michael L. Rogel (39)	White	Bozeman, Montana	Michael Rogel called 911 and stated he belied "people were coming to kill him." Rogel suffered from paranoid schizophrenia which may have been related. When police officers approached his vehicle, Rogel allegedly produced a firearm which led to police shooting him.
2023-04-02	Eduardo Lee Hoover (38)		Washington, Pennsylvania	Hoover was shot by police following a chase. According to police, officers shot Hoover after he drove his truck in reverse towards police.
2023-04-02	unidentified adult male		Las Cruces, New Mexico	A man drove through a border patrol checkpoint and went on an hour long high speed chase with border patrol. After spike strips were deployed, he exited his vehicle with a club and began a foot chase. He attempted to hit agents with the club numerous times and used a shirt to block the taser attempts by agents. After knocking an agent to the ground, he hit them twice before being shot.
2023-04-01	Dwight Cornwell (76)		Phoenix, Arizona	Cornwell was attempting to break into a woman's residence through her window using his firearm. When police told him to drop his weapon, he refused to comply, shooting a round into the air, and was shot.
2023-04-01	Tyler Raymer (28)	White	Versailles, Missouri	Raymer shot at two deputies who returned fire, killing him.
2023-04-01	Zachery Polk (53)	White	Wayne, Michigan	Police were called to the Ford Stamping Plant in Wayne, Michigan. When the officers arrived, Polk allegedly pointed a gun at them, which caused an officer to shoot Polk. Polk was taken to a hospital where he later died.
2023-04-01	Erick Jara (27)	Unknown	Grand Junction, Colorado	Jara was shot after he had a knife and had attempted to stab his roommate.

== See also ==
- Death in custody § United States
- Henry A. Wallace Police Crime Public Database
- List of cases of police brutality
- List of countries with annual rates and counts for killings by law enforcement officers
- List of law enforcement officers killed in the line of duty in the United States
- List of law enforcement officers convicted for an on-duty killing in the United States
- List of police reforms related to the George Floyd protests
- List of unarmed African Americans killed by law enforcement officers in the United States
- Lists of killings by law enforcement officers
- Police brutality in the United States
- Police misconduct § United States
- Police riot § United States
- Police use of deadly force in the United States
