= Time and Seasons =

Studio album by Commissioned
- Released: October 12, 1999
- Genre: Gospel music
- Length: 72:12
- Label: Verity Records
- Producer: Commissioned

Commissioned chronology
Irreplaceable Love (1996)	Time and Seasons (1999)	The Commissioned Reunion Live (2002)

Time and Seasons is the tenth album by American contemporary gospel music group Commissioned, released on October 12, 1999 via Verity Records. New members, Marcus Cole and Chris Poole joined in this group after the departure of then-member Marvin Sapp, who left the group in 1997.

Domestically, the album peaked at number 6 on the US Billboard Top Gospel albums chart, number 13 on the Billboard Top Contemporary Christian chart and number 28 on the Billboard Heatseekers chart.

== Track listing ==
1. "Shama of God" (1:35)
2. "Barach You" (4:37)
3. "Glorious Praise" (4:10)
4. "Testimony Service" (1:24)
5. "Testify" (4:23)
6. "You've Been Good" (4:50)
7. "Trying of Your Faith" (4:34)
8. "Psalms 84" (4:37)
9. "Just Worship" (1:17)
10. "Believe" (4:22)
11. "One Love" (4:45)
12. "Charge It to My Head" (4:17)
13. "That Ain't No Commissioners" (1:19)
14. "You Stayed With Me Lord" (2:09)
15. "Thank You for Loving Me" (4:49)
16. "Ordinary Just Won't Do" (4:54)
17. "Clean Heart" (5:13)
18. "You Are Forgiven" (4:55)
19. "Walk Right" (4:02)

== Personnel ==
- Karl Reid: vocals
- Marcus Cole: vocals, keyboard programming
- Mitchell Jones: vocals, drum programming
- Chris Poole: vocals

Additional Musicians

- Rufus Troutman: talk box
- Michael J. Mindingall & Communion: background vocals
- Tim Bowman: guitar
