= Kree Woods =

American singer-songwriter

- Born: Kristen Noel Woods; December 9, 1987 (age 37)
- Genres: Indie-Pop, Singer/Songwriter
- Labels: Yosh Bros. Entertainment
- Website: kreewoods.com

Kristen Noel Woods (born December 9, 1987) is a Nashville-based indie-pop singer/songwriter best known for her single "Cave In", which was featured on MTV's 2011 season of The Real World: Las Vegas and peaked at No. 10 on the iTunes singer/songwriter charts, also gaining more than 30,000 views on YouTube.

== Biography ==
Woods was raised in Franklin, Tennessee, graduating from Centennial High School (2006) before attending Auburn University, from which she earned her Bachelor of Fine Arts in musical theatre in 2010.

== Career ==
Woods began working with award winning producer and engineer John Jaszcz and production team Zodlounge Music to release her first five-song EP under Jaszcz's Yosh Bros Entertainment independent record label in March 2011. This EP featured "Cave In," that attained a strong following on YouTube and reached No. 10 on the iTunes singer/songwriter chart following a featured spot on MTV's The Real World: Las Vegas in April and May 2011.

The new music blog, Kings of A&R, featured Woods on February 15, 2011 in promotion of her upcoming EP. It was also featured on April 14, 2011 in anticipation of her MTV placement.

A second five-song EP is slated for release in Fall 2011.

On April 9, 2013, after a successful campaign to raise funds on Kickstarter, Woods released a full-length, 11-song album titled "Talking Underwater" with Zodlounge Records. Kree previewed the songs at SXSWM in March 2013 and will embark on a US tour in May 2013 to support the album.

== Discography ==
Release date	Album
March 2011	Kree Woods
2011	Chance Happening
April 2013	Talking Underwater
