= Go Tell Somebody =

Studio album by Commissioned
- Released: February 25, 1986
- Studio: Proving Ground Studio (Detroit, Michigan); Studio A (Dearborn Heights, Michigan)
- Genre: Gospel music
- Length: 37:45
- Label: Light Records
- Producer: Michael Brooks; Fred Hammond

Commissioned chronology
I'm Going On (1984)	Go Tell Somebody (1986)	On the Winning Side (1987)

Go Tell Somebody, is the second album by American contemporary gospel music group Commissioned, released in 1986 on Light Records.

Domestically, the album peaked at number 2 on the US Billboard Top Gospel albums chart.

== Track listing ==
1. "Victory" (Michael Brooks, Mitchell Jones) - 4:59
2. "Love Isn't Love" (Brooks) - 5:13
3. "Go Tell Somebody" (Brooks) - 4:43
4. "Cry On" (Jones, Parkes Stewart) - 5:09
5. "Who Do Men Say I Am" (Fred Hammond) - 4:32
6. "Hide The Word" (Brooks) - 4:51
7. "Learn To Pray" (Brooks) - 4:01
8. "Running Back To You" (Hammond) - 4:45

== Personnel ==
Commissioned

- Fred Hammond – vocals, bass guitar (1–4, 6–8), Synclavier computer (5)
- Mitchell Jones – vocals
- Karl Reid – vocals
- Keith Staten – vocals
- Michael Brooks – keyboards (1–4, 6–8), grand piano (5), Roland Juno-106 (5), Roland JX-8P (5), Yamaha DX100 (5), Yamaha TX7 (5), Synclavier computer (5), percussion (5), horn arrangements (7)
- Michael Williams – drums (1–4, 6–8), percussion (5), Latin percussion

Additional musicians

- Earl J. Wright – Yamaha DX7, Moog synthesizer solo (1, 4), Moog synthesizer (2), keyboards (7)
- Eric Brice – electric guitar, lead guitar (1), guitars (6, 7)
- Michael Wright – electric guitar, guitar solo (2), guitars (3, 6, 7)
- Michael J. Powell – classical guitar (8)

=== Production ===
- Alan Abrahams – executive producer
- Michael Brooks – producer
- Fred Hammond – producer
- Billy Brooks – engineer
- John Jaszcz – engineer
- Eric Livengood – engineer
- Stephen King – engineer
- Janis Broughton – project coordinator
- Ameen Howrani – photography
- Tim Alderson – cover art
- Greg Gaylor – clothing
- John McDaniels – hair stylist
- Andre Chippe – make-up
- D.C.D Management – management
