= Rule the World (2 Chainz song) =

2019 single by 2 Chainz featuring Ariana Grande

Single by 2 Chainz featuring Ariana Grande

from the album Rap or Go to the League
- Released: March 19, 2019
- Recorded: January 2019
- Genre: Old-school hip-hop; R&B
- Length: 4:06
- Label: Def Jam
- Songwriters: Tauheed Epps; Robert Watson; Racquelle Anteola; Melvin Moore; Carl McCormick; Richard Harrison
- Producers: Cardiak; Rob Holladay; Hitmaka; Paul Cabbin

2 Chainz singles chronology
"Girl's Best Friend" (2018)	"Rule the World" (2019)	"2 Dollar Bill" (2019)

Ariana Grande singles chronology
"Break Up with Your Girlfriend, I'm Bored" (2019)	"Rule the World" (2019)	"Monopoly" (2019)

Music video
- "Rule the World" on YouTube

"Rule the World" is a song by American rapper 2 Chainz featuring American singer-songwriter Ariana Grande, released as the second single from the former's fifth studio album Rap or Go to the League on March 19, 2019. It samples "Why Don't We Fall in Love" by Amerie. It is Epps' and Grande's second collaboration, following the remix of "7 Rings", from Grande's fifth studio album, Thank U, Next (2019). It was nominated for a MTV Video Music Award for Best Hip-Hop Video in 2019.

== Background ==
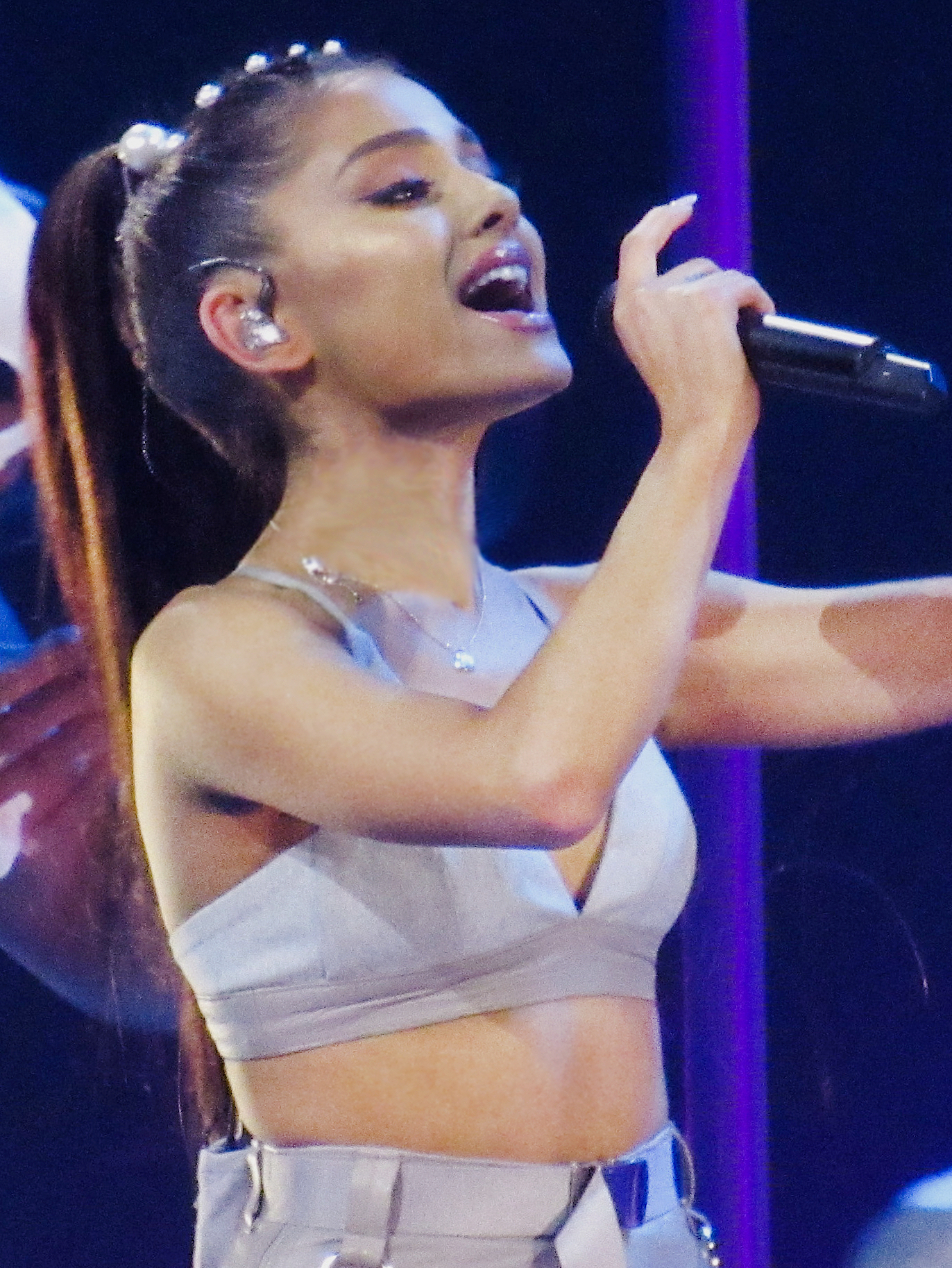
"Rule the World" was recorded as a result of an in-person meeting between 2 Chainz and Ariana Grande (pictured) about plagiarism accusations surrounding "7 Rings"

In January 2019, Grande released the single "7 Rings" from her fifth studio album Thank U, Next (2019). 2 Chainz pointed out the song's similarity to his own 2011 track "Spend It". The music video for "7 Rings" was also accused of stealing 2 Chainz's pink trap aesthetics used to promote Pretty Girls Like Trap Music (2017).

Later in the month, 2 Chainz and Grande met in person to squash the dispute. The meeting went well, ending with 2 Chainz recording the official remix to "7 Rings" and Grande providing featured vocals for "Rule the World".

== Music video ==
A music video for "Rule the World" was released on March 11, 2019. The video, directed by Sebastian Sdaigui, features 2 Chainz and Grande at a luxurious 1920s club, singing the song alongside a band.

== Commercial performance ==
Though met with critical acclaim, often being referred to as "R&B perfection", "Rule the World" debuted at number 94 on the Hot 100 following the release of the parent album, the only charting track of the LP. The song fell off the chart the following week but later re-entered the chart at number 98 in late May, spending a second week there.

== Live performances ==
2 Chainz first performed "Rule the World" alongside Grande on March 20, 2019 during her Sweetener World Tour in Boston, MA. 2 Chainz performed the song live on Jimmy Kimmel Live! in April 2019. In May 2019, 2 Chainz performed the song alongside Amerie on The Ellen DeGeneres Show.

== Credits and personnel ==
Credits adapted from Tidal.

- 2 Chainz – vocals, songwriter
- Ariana Grande – vocals
- Robert Watson – songwriter
- Racquelle Anteola – songwriter
- Moore Ray III – songwriter
- Christopher Michael Brown – songwriter
- Lerron Carson – songwriter
- Richard Harrison – songwriter
- Cardiak – producer, songwriter
- Hitmaka – producer, songwriter
- Paul Cabbin – producer
- Rob Holladay – additional producer
- Billy Hickey – recording engineer, studio personnel
- Nolan Presley – recording engineer, studio personnel
- Finis "KY" White – mixer, studio personnel
- Serban Ghenea – mixer, studio personnel

== Charts ==
=== Weekly charts ===
Chart (2019)	Peak position
Canada Hot 100 (Billboard)	93
Israel (Media Forest TV Airplay)	6
Lithuania (AGATA)	47
New Zealand Hot Singles (RMNZ)	11
US Billboard Hot 100	94
US Hot R&B/Hip-Hop Songs (Billboard)	37
US Rhythmic Airplay (Billboard)	5

=== Year-end charts ===
Chart (2019)	Position
US Rhythmic (Billboard)	38

== Certifications ==
Region	Certification	Certified units/sales
United States (RIAA)	Gold	500,000^{‡}
^{‡} Sales+streaming figures based on certification alone.

== Release history ==
Release dates and formats for "Rule the World"
Region	Date	Format	Label	Ref.
United States	March 19, 2019	Rhythmic contemporary	Def Jam	
