= I Will Trust =

Studio album by Fred Hammond
- Released: November 17, 2014
- Genre: CCM, Contemporary Gospel
- Length: 74:11
- Label: RCA Records

Fred Hammond chronology
United Tenors (2013)	I Will Trust (2014)

Professional ratings
Review scores
Source	Rating
AllMusic	4/5 stars

I Will Trust is the fourteenth solo album from Contemporary Gospel singer Fred Hammond. The album was released on November 17, 2014 through RCA Records.

== Background ==
I Will Trust sees Fred Hammond freshly inspired after he underwent double knee replacement. Feelings of gratefulness and unswerving trust fill the album, which is jubilant—often to a full-tilt extent—even at its most reflective. Unsurprisingly, there are some nimble and juicy basslines here, as heard throughout "I Believe," "It's Mine," and "You Bless Me Over and Over." Rather amazingly, Hammond supported this album with a 30-city tour alongside Donnie McClurkin.

== Track listing ==
No.	Title	Composer(s)	Length
1.	"Festival of Praise"	Noel Hall; Fred Hammond; Pam Kenyon; Tiffany McGhee	7:12
2.	"All the Way"	Philip Feaster; Hammond; Calvin Rodgers	5:54
3.	"His Perfect Love" (featuring BreeAnn Hammond)	Hammond; Shaun Martin	6:56
4.	"Lord Have Your Way"	Autumn Cannon; Feaster; Hammond; McGhee; C. Rodgers; Willie Rodgers	8:43
5.	"I Believe"	Feaster; Hall; Hammond; C. Rodgers	5:29
6.	"Take Me To the Water"	Feaster; Hammond; C. Rodgers	5:21
7.	"Try Jesus"	Feaster; Hammond; Lawrence Jones; C. Rodgers	4:53
8.	"I Will Trust"	Feaster; Hammond; C. Rodgers	6:34
9.	"It's Only the Comforter"	Hall; Hammond	5:53
10.	"It's Mine"	Hammond; Kenyon; King Logan	4:28
11.	"You Bless Me Over and Over"	Feaster; Hammond; C. Rodgers	5:56
12.	"I Owe It All"	Feaster; Lehman Gray; Hammond; Kenyon; McGhee; C. Rodgers	6:52

== Personnel ==
Credits adapted from AllMusic.

- Fred Hammond - Guitar (Bass), Key Bass, Mixing, Vocals
- Lloyd Barry - Horn
- Cristin "Cris" Brenham - Keyboards
- Autumn Cannon - Vocals (Background)
- Kenneth Diggs - Guitar (Bass)
- Alan "Snoop" Evans - Guitar (Bass)
- Philip Feaster - Keyboards, Strings
- Lehman Gray - Vocals (Background)
- Noel Hall - Keyboards, Piano
- BreeAnn Hammond - Clapping, Crowd Noise, Vocals, Vocals (Background)
- Rachel Hammond - Clapping, Crowd Noise, Vocals (Background)
- Lawrence Jones - Guitar
- Pam Kenyon - Vocals (Background)
- Mark Lettieri - Guitar
- King Logan - Drums, Keyboards
- Shaun Martin - Keyboards
- Tiffany McGhee - Vocals (Background)
- Destiny McGill - Vocals (Background)
- Calvin Rodgers - Drums
- Javier Solís - Percussion
- Tisha Stratford - Vocals (Background)
- The Warehouse Crew - Clapping, Crowd Noise, Vocals (Background)
