= Soul Train Music Award for Best Gospel Album – Solo =

Annual US music award

This page lists the winners and nominees for the Soul Train Music Award for Best Gospel Album – Solo. The award was only given out during the first two ceremonies, before being retired in 1989.

== Winners and nominees ==
Winners are listed first and highlighted in bold.

=== 1980s ===
Year	Artist	Album	Ref
1987
1987	**Al Green**	**He Is the Light**	
1987	Shirley Caesar	Celebration	
1987	Andraé Crouch	Autograph	
1987	Tramaine	The Search is Over	
1988
1988	**Vanessa Bell Armstrong**	**Following Jesus**	
1988	Shirley Caesar	Her Very Best	
1988	Aretha Franklin	One Lord, One Faith, One Baptism	
1988	Al Green	Soul Survivor	

== See also ==
- Soul Train Music Award for Best Gospel Album
- Soul Train Music Award for Best Gospel Album – Group or Band
