= I'm Going On =

Album by Commissioned

Studio album by Commissioned
- Released: January 1, 1985
- Recorded: 1984
- Genre: Gospel music
- Length: 34:11
- Producer: Michael Brooks; Fred Hammond

Commissioned chronology
I'm Going On (1985)	Go Tell Somebody (1986)

I'm Going On is the debut album by American contemporary gospel music group Commissioned, released in 1985 on Light Records.

Domestically, Commissioned's debut album reached at number 11, on the US Billboard Top Gospel albums chart.

== Track listing ==
1. "I'm Going On" (Michael Brooks) - 3:50
2. "'Tis So Sweet" (Arrangement: Earl Wright) - 4:12
3. "I Can See Jesus" (Fred Hammond, Darryl Ford) - 4:38
4. "Unworthy" (Brooks) - 4:20
5. "You've Got a Friend" (Brooks) - 3:50
6. "The City" (Brooks) - 3:55
7. "Giving My Problems to You" (Brooks) - 4:23
8. "Surely We Need Him" (Ford) - 4:30

== Personnel ==
- Fred Hammond: vocals, bass
- Keith Staten: vocals
- Mitchell Jones: vocals
- Karl Reid: vocals
- Michael Brooks: keyboard
- Michael Williams: drums
- Scotti Jones: percussion
