= Fred Hammond =

American musician and record producer

- Born: Frederick William Hammond; December 27, 1960 (age 65); Detroit, Michigan, U.S.
- Origin: Detroit, Michigan
- Genres: Gospel, Contemporary Christian, inspirational
- Occupations: Musician, producer
- Instruments: Vocals, bass guitar
- Years active: 1985–present
- Labels: Light, Verity, A&M, Benson
- Website: realfredhammond.com

Frederick William Hammond (born December 27, 1960) is an American gospel singer, bass guitar player, and record producer. He is regarded as one of the most popular figures in contemporary gospel music. He is known for using a variety of different styles in his music such as R&B, hip-hop, and disco.

== Musical career ==
Hammond has been active both as a member of the gospel performing group Commissioned, and as a solo artist (currently for Verity Records). He is a multiple Grammy, Dove, and Stellar award winner and nominee as a performer, producer, and writer.

Hammond first gained recognition while playing bass guitar for the gospel group The Winans. By 1985, he was one of the six original members of the group Commissioned, participating in 10 of the group's 12 albums.

After his time with Commissioned ended, he regained fame in the gospel community after selling millions of albums with his musical group Radical For Christ.

In 2002, Hammond returned to the group Commissioned (now with members Keith Staten, Marvin Sapp, Mitchell Jones, Karl Reid, Michael Williams, and Marcus Cole) to produce the Commissioned Reunion Live album.

Hammond produced "Make Me Like the Moon", a gospel ballad co-written by Chanté Moore and Kenny Lattimore for their 2006 double-CD of gospel and R&B love songs entitled Uncovered/Covered (released October 10, 2006, by LaFace/Verity/Zomba Music Group). He also performs with Sean Combs on the unreleased album, Thank You.

== Discography ==
=== Solo Albums ===
Title	Album details	Chart positions		
Title	Album details	US	US Gospel	US R&B/HH
I Am Persuaded	Released: 1991; Label: Verity Records, Benson Records	—	11	—
Deliverance	Released: 1993; Label: A&M Records	—	26	—
In Case You Missed It....And Then Some	Released: March 6, 2001; Label: Verity Records	—	—	—
Christmas...Just Remember	Released: September 11, 2001; Label: Verity Records	—	2	—
Speak Those Things: POL Chapter 3	Released: September 10, 2002; Label: Verity Records	38	1	13
Hooked on the Hits	Released: September 9, 2003; Label: Verity Records	—	—	—
Somethin' 'Bout Love	Released: June 8, 2004; Label: Verity Records	35	1	4
Free to Worship	Released: October 3, 2006; Label: Verity Records	29	1	—
Love Unstoppable	Released: September 29, 2009; Label: Verity Gospel Music Group	26	1	—
God, Love & Romance	Released: January 31, 2012; Label: Verity Gospel Music Group	8	1	—
United Tenors	Released: March 26, 2013; Label: RCA Records	39	1	—
I Will Trust	Released: November 17, 2014; Label: RCA Records	41	1	—
Worship Journal Live	Released: September 30, 2016; Label: Provident Label Group, RCA Records	113	1	—
Uncle Fred - Texture of a Man	Released: May 11, 2018; Label: Provident Label Group, Face To Face Productions	—	6	—
Sunday Morning Fred	Released: November 14, 2021; Label: Face To Face Productions	—	—	—

=== with Commissioned ===
Title	Album details	Chart positions		
Title	Album details	US	US Gospel	US R&B/HH
I'm Going On	Released: 1985; Label: Light Records	—	—	—
Go Tell Somebody	Released: 1986; Label: Light Records	—	—	—
On The Winning Side	Released: 1987; Label: Light Records	—	—	—
Will You Be Ready?	Released: 1988; Label: Light Records	—	—	—
Ordinary Just Won't Do	Released: 1989; Label: Light Records	—	—	—
State of Mind	Released: Label: Verity Records	—	—	—
Number 7	Released: 1991; Label: A&M Records	—	—	—
Matters of the Heart	Released: 1994; Label: A&M Records	—	—	65
Gospel Greats	Released: December 1, 1995; Label: Benson Records	—	—	—
Praise & Worship	Released: June 13, 2006; Label: Verity Records, Legacy Records	—	—	—

=== with Radical for Christ ===
Title	Album details	Chart positions		
Title	Album details	US	US Gospel	US R&B/HH
The Inner Court	Released: 1995; Label: Benson Records	—	10	—
The Spirit of David	Released: August 20, 1996; Label: Benson Records	—	2	—
Pages of Life - Chapters I & II	Released: April 28, 1998; Label: Verity Records	51	1	—
Purpose By Design	Released: March 21, 2000; Label: Verity Records	46	1	18
The Commissioned Reunion Live	Released: April 23, 2002; Label: Verity Records	—	3	—

=== with FK&M ===
Title	Album details	Chart positions		
Title	Album details	US	US Gospel	US R&B/HH
Time Capsule - The Triolgy	Released: August 30, 2024; Label: 3Brothers/Dare Records	—	—	—

== Awards and nominations ==
=== BET Awards ===
The BET Awards are awarded annually by the Black Entertainment Television network. Hammond has received 8 nominations.

Year	Award	Nominated work	Result
2002	Best Gospel Artist	Himself	Nominated
2005	Best Gospel Artist	Himself	Nominated
2007	Best Gospel Artist	Himself	Nominated
2012	Best Gospel Artist	Himself	Nominated
2015	Best Gospel Artist	Himself	Nominated
2019	Dr. Bobby Jones Best Gospel/Inspirational Award	"Tell Me Where It Hurts"	Nominated
2020	Dr. Bobby Jones Best Gospel/Inspirational Award	"Alright"	Nominated
2022	Dr. Bobby Jones Best Gospel/Inspirational Award	"Hallelujah"	Nominated

=== Dove Awards ===
The Dove Awards are awarded annually by the Gospel Music Association. Hammond has received 9 awards from 34 nominations and has also been inducted into the Hall of Fame.

Year	Award	Nominated work	Result
1990	Contemporary Black Gospel Album of the Year	Will You Be Ready? (with Commissioned)	Won
1991	Contemporary Black Gospel Album of the Year	State of Mind (with Commissioned)	Nominated
1993	Inspiration Album of the Year	Generation 2 Generation	Won
1993	Contemporary Black Gospel Album of the Year	Handel's Messiah: A Soulful Celebration	Won
1993	Contemporary Black Gospel Recorded Song of the Year	"Kings of Glory" (with Commissioned)	Nominated
1995	Contemporary Black Gospel Album of the Year	Matters of the Year (with Commissioned)	Nominated
1996	Urban Album of the Year	Give Your Love (as producer)	Won
1996	Contemporary Gospel Recorded Song of the Year	"Glory To Glory To Glory"	Nominated
1997	Contemporary Gospel Album of the Year	Irreplaceable Love (with Commissioned)	Nominated
1997	Contemporary Gospel Album of the Year	The Spirit of David	Nominated
1997	Contemporary Gospel Recorded Song of the Year	"No Weapon"	Nominated
1999	Contemporary Gospel Recorded Song of the Year	"Let The Praise Begin"	Won
1999	Contemporary Gospel Recorded Song of the Year	"Your Steps Are Ordered"	Nominated
1999	Contemporary Gospel Recorded Song of the Year	"Jesus Is All"	Nominated
1999	Contemporary Gospel Album of the Year	Pages of Life: Chapters 1 & 2	Nominated
2000	Contemporary Gospel Recorded Song of the Year	"Power"	Won
2000	Male Vocalist of the Year	Himself	Nominated
2001	Contemporary Gospel Album of the Year	Purpose by Design	Won
2001	Long Form Video of the Year	Purpose by Design	Nominated
2001	Traditional Gospel Recorded Song of the Year	"When You Praise"	Nominated
2001	Urban Recorded Song of the Year	"I Want My Destiny"	Nominated
2002	Urban Album of the Year	Christmas... Just Remember	Won
2002	Special Event Album of the Year	In Case You Missed It ... and Then Some	Nominated
2003	Contemporary Gospel Album of the Year	Speak Those Things: POL Chapter 3	Nominated
2005	Contemporary Gospel Album of the Year	Somethin' 'Bout Love	Nominated
2005	Contemporary Gospel Recorded Song of the Year	"Celebrate (He Lives)"	Nominated
2006	Contemporary Gospel Recorded Song of the Year	"I Will Find A Way"	Nominated
2007	Contemporary Gospel Album of the Year	Free to Worship	Nominated
2010	Contemporary Gospel Album of the Year	Love Unstoppable	Won
2010	Contemporary Gospel Recorded Song of the Year	"Awesome God"	Nominated
2015	Gospel Artist of the Year	Himself	Nominated
2015	Contemporary Gospel/Urban Album of the Year	I Will Trust	Nominated
2017	Contemporary Gospel/Urban Album of the Year	Worship Journal - Live	Nominated
2017	Contemporary Gospel/Urban Recorded Song of the Year	"Father Jesus Spirit"	Nominated
2026	Traditional Gospel Recorded Song of the Year	"Love Never Fails"	Pending

=== Grammy Awards ===
The Grammy Awards are awarded annually by the National Academy of Recording Arts and Sciences. Hammond has received 1 award from 15 nominations.

Year	Award	Nominated work	Result
1990	Best Soup Gospel Vocal Performance By a Duo, Group, Choir, or Chorus	Will You Be Ready? (with Commissioned)	Nominated
1992	Best Pop Gospel Album'	Shakin' The House...Live	Nominated
1995	Best Contemporary Soul Gospel Album	Matters of the Heart	Nominated
1997	Best Contemporary Soul Gospel Album	Shakin' The House...Live In L.A.	Nominated
1999	Best Contemporary Soul Gospel Album	Pages Of Life - Chapters I And II	Nominated
1999	Best Engineered Album - Non-Classical	The Nu Nation Project	Nominated
2001	Best Contemporary Soul Gospel Album	Purpose By Design	Nominated
2002	Best Contemporary Soul Gospel Album	In Case You Missed It...And Then Some	Nominated
2003	Best Contemporary Soul Gospel Album	Speak Those Things: POL Chapter 3	Nominated
2003	Best Contemporary Soul Gospel Album	The Commissioned Reunion "Live"	Nominated
2005	Best Contemporary Soul Gospel Album	Somethin' 'Bout Love	Nominated
2005	Best Gospel Performance	"Celebrate (He Lives)"	Nominated
2008	Best Contemporary R&B Gospel Album	Free To Worship	Won
2011	Best Contemporary R&B Gospel Album	Love Unstoppable	Nominated
2013	Best Gospel Song	"I Feel Good"	Nominated

=== NAACP Image Awards ===
The NAACP Image Awards are awarded annually by the National Association for the Advancement of Colored People (NAACP). Hammond has received 7 nominations.

Year	Award	Nominated work	Result
1999	Outstanding Gospel Artist	Himself	Nominated
2003	Outstanding Gospel Artist	Himself	Nominated
2005	Outstanding Gospel Artist	Himself	Nominated
2007	Outstanding Gospel Artist	Himself	Nominated
2010	Outstanding Gospel Album	Love Unstoppable	Nominated
2013	Outstanding Gospel Album	God, Love & Romance	Nominated
2017	Outstanding Gospel Album	Worship Journal Live	Nominated

=== Soul Train Awards ===
The Soul Train Music Awards are awarded annually. Hammond has received 5 nominations.

Year	Award	Nominated work	Result
1999	Best Gospel Album	Pages of Life - Chapters I & II	Nominated
2009	Best Gospel Performance	"They That Wait" (with John P Kee)	Nominated
2010	Best Gospel Performance	Himself	Nominated
2015	Best Gospel/Inspirational Song	"I Will Trust" (with BreeAnn Hammond)	Nominated
2022	Best Gospel/Inspiration Award	Himself	Nominated

=== Stellar Awards ===
The Stellar Awards are awarded annually by SAGMA. Hammond has received 9 awards from 58 nominations.

Year	Award	Nominated work	Result
2003	Song of the Year	"King of Glory"	Nominated
2003	Contemporary Male Vocalist of the Year	Christmas... Just Remember	Nominated
2003	Contemporary CD of the Year	The Commissioned Reunion Live (with Commissioned)	Nominated
2003	Contemporary Group/Duo of the Year	The Commissioned Reunion Live (with Commissioned)	Nominated
2003	Group Duo of the Year	The Commissioned Reunion Live (with Commissioned)	Nominated
2003	Producer of the Year	The Commissioned Reunion Live (with Commissioned)	Nominated
2003	Special Event CD of the Year	The Commissioned Reunion Live (with Commissioned)	Won
2005	Contemporary Male Vocalist of the Year	Speak Those Things: POL Chapter 3	Nominated
2005	Producer of the Year	Somethin' 'Bout Love	Won
2005	Artist of the Year	Somethin' 'Bout Love	Nominated
2005	CD of the Year	Somethin' 'Bout Love	Nominated
2005	Contemporary CD of the Year	Somethin' 'Bout Love	Nominated
2005	Contemporary Male Vocalist of the Year	Somethin' 'Bout Love	Nominated
2005	Song of the Year	"Celebrate (He Lives)"	Nominated
2007	Producer of the Year	Better Than That	Nominated
2008	Contemporary Male of the Year	Free To Worship	Won
2008	Artist of the Year	Free To Worship	Nominated
2008	Male Vocalist of the Year	Free To Worship	Nominated
2008	Producer of the Year	Free To Worship	Nominated
2011	Artist of the Year	Love Unstoppable	Nominated
2011	CD of the Year	Love Unstoppable	Nominated
2011	Contemporary Male Vocalist of the Year	Love Unstoppable	Nominated
2011	Contemporary CD of the Year	Love Unstoppable	Nominated
2011	Male Vocalist of the Year	Love Unstoppable	Nominated
2011	Producer of the Year	Love Unstoppable	Nominated
2011	Song of the Year	"They That Wait"	Nominated
2013	Contemporary Male Vocalist of the Year	God, Love & Romance	Won
2013	CD of the Year	God, Love & Romance	Nominated
2013	Contemporary CD of the Year	God, Love & Romance	Nominated
2013	Male Vocalist of the Year	God, Love & Romance	Nominated
2013	Producer of the Year	God, Love & Romance	Nominated
2013	Urban/Inspirational Single or Performance of the Year	"I Feel Good"	Nominated
2014	Producer of the Year	United Tenors	Won
2014	Contemporary CD of the Year	United Tenors	Nominated
2014	Contemporary Group/Duo of the Year	United Tenors	Nominated
2014	Contemporary Male Vocalist of the Year	United Tenors	Nominated
2014	Group/Duo of the Year	United Tenors	Nominated
2014	Urban/Inspiration Single or Performance of the Year	"Here In Our Praise"	Nominated
2016	Contemporary Male Vocalist of the Year	I Will Trust	Nominated
2016	Male Vocalist of the Year	I Will Trust	Nominated
2017	Traditional CD of the Year	Worship Journal Live	Nominated
2017	Traditional Male Vocalist of the Year	Worship Journal Live	Nominated
2019	Special Event CD of the Year	The Best of Fred Hammond	Won
2021	Urban/Inspiration Single or Performance of the Year	"Alright"	Nominated
2021	Producer of the Year	"Alright"	Nominated
2025	Duo/Chorus Group of the Year	Time Capsule - The Trilogy (with Keith Staten and Marcus Cole)	Nominated
2025	Producer of the Year	Time Capsule - The Trilogy (with Keith Staten and Marcus Cole)	Nominated

== Personal life ==
Hammond has two children who have appeared on his 2009 album, Love Unstoppable. Hammond divorced his wife of 18 years, Kim, in 2004, and he currently resides in Cedar Hill, Texas.

Hammond revealed on the Donnie McClurkin Show that his mother confessed to him three months before she died that she tried to get an abortion when she was pregnant with him, and the procedure, done in 1960, before abortions were legal, failed. Hammond's mother returned for a second attempt but decided against the procedure; Hammond was later born in December 1960.

According to Fred Hammond in an interview with Tim Ross, his father is Bishop Charles Watkins (now deceased), a former gospel artist and a former full bishop in the Pentecostal Assemblies of the World, Inc. (Headquartered in Indianapolis, Indiana)

Hammond is an honorary member of Phi Beta Sigma fraternity
