= Love Unstoppable =

Studio album by Fred Hammond
- Released: September 29, 2009
- Genre: Contemporary Christian music, gospel
- Length: 70:01
- Label: Verity Gospel Music Group/Jive

Fred Hammond chronology
Free to Worship (2006)	Love Unstoppable (2009)	Life In The Word (2010)

Professional ratings
Review scores
Source	Rating
AllMusic	3.5/5 stars

Love Unstoppable is the tenth album by the American gospel singer Fred Hammond. The album was released on September 29, 2009, on the newly established Verity Gospel Music Group and Jive partnership.

== Track listing ==
1. "Prelude: BreeAnn" - Michelle & Darius Sean Hammond - 1:25
2. "Awesome God" - Fred Hammond - 7:18
3. "Nobody Like You Lord" - 6:27
4. "Find No Fault" - 5:48
5. "Lost In You Again" - 4:34
6. "I Need You Right Away" (featuring Michael Bethany) - 1:32
7. "Best Thing That Ever Happened" - 5:22
8. "They That Wait" (featuring John P. Kee) - 6:17
9. "We Give You All The Praise" (featuring Ericka R. Warren) - 1:02
10. "Take My Hand" - Fred Hammond - 5:50
11. "I Know What He's Done" - 5:13
12. "Thoughts Of Love" - 4:57
13. "You're Good (Dios Es Bueno)" - 3:45
14. "Lord How I Love You" - 6:07
15. "Happy" - 4:25

== Credits ==
Producers:

- Michael Bethany
- Ericka Warren
- Fred Hammond
- Ray Hammond

Executive Producers:

- Fred Hammond
- Ray Hammond

Worship Leader:

- Fred Hammond

Musicians:

- Calvin Rodgers – Drums
- Phillip Feaster – Keyboards, Organ
- Darius Fentress - Percussion
- Lawrence Jones - Guitar
- Shelton Summons - Keyboards
- Alan Evans II - Bass
- Fred Hammond – Bass, Keyboards
- Bobby Sparks - Organ

Vocals:

- Ericka Warren
- Michael Bethany
- Dynna Wilson Wells
- Destiny Williams
- John P. Kee

Engineers

- Darius Fentress - Engineer
- Derek "DC" Clark - Engineer
- Fred Hammond - Engineer, Mixing
- Ray Hammond - Engineer, Mixing

== Awards ==
At the 41st GMA Dove Awards, Love Unstoppable won a Dove Award for Contemporary Gospel Album of the Year. Also, the song "Awesome God" was nominated for Contemporary Gospel Recorded Song of the Year.

== Chart performance ==
The album peaked at #1 on Billboard's Gospel Albums chart. It has spent 66 weeks on the charts. The song "Awesome God" peaked at #14 on Billboard's Gospel Songs.
