= Number 7 (album) =

Studio album by Commissioned
- Released: March 19, 1991
- Studio: Studio A (Dearborn Heights, Michigan); VanGuard Studio (Oak Park, Michigan); Sound Suite Studio (Detroit, Michigan)
- Genre: Gospel music
- Length: 64:27
- Label: Benson Records
- Producer: Fred Hammond; Mitchell Jones; Bernard Wright; Maxx Frank

Commissioned chronology
State of Mind (1990)	Number 7 (1991)	Matters of the Heart (1994)

Number 7 is the seventh album by the American urban contemporary gospel group Commissioned, released in 1991 on Benson Records.

At the time of the album's release, Commissioned's line-up included four of its six original members (Fred Hammond, Mitchell Jones, Mike Williams and Karl Reid) along with newer members Marvin Sapp, Maxx Frank and Eddie Howard.

== Track listing ==
1. "Second Chance" (Anson Dawkins, Eric Dawkins, Eddie Howard Jr.) – 5:37
2. "Love U With the Rest of My Life" (Fred Hammond, Maxx Frank) – 5:51
3. "We Are Overcomers" (Anson Dawkins, Mitchell Jones) – 5:40
4. "I Really Love the Lord (Interlude)" (Hammond, Frank) – 0:51
5. "Hold Me" (Jones, Parkes Stewart) – 5:56
6. "King of Glory" (Hammond) – 5:57
7. "Please You More" (Hammond, Frank) – 6:29
8. "Be an Example" (Hammond, Anson Dawkins) – 5:23
9. "I Can't Live Without U" (Hammond, Eric Dawkins) – 4:34
10. "Secret Place" (Hammond, Anson Dawkins, Eddie Howard Jr.) – 4:15
11. "I Really Love the Lord" (Hammond, Frank) – 2:42
12. "I Love Thinking of U" (Jones, Stewart) – 4:39
13. "Please You More [instrumental]" (Hammond, Frank) – 6:26

== Chart positions ==
=== Album ===
Year	Chart	Peak
1991	Top Contemporary Christian	22
1991	Top Gospel Albums	7

== Personnel ==
Commissioned

- Fred Hammond – vocals, bass (1, 2, 4, 5, 10, 11), drum programming (1, 2, 6–9, 12, 23), arrangements (1), vocal arrangements (3), keyboards (7–9, 13)
- Mitchell Jones – vocals, keyboards (3, 5, 12), drum programming (3, 5), vocal arrangements (3, 5)
- Karl Reid – vocals
- Marvin Sapp – vocals
- Maxx Frank – keyboards (1, 2, 4, 6–13), string overdub (5), acoustic piano solo (7, 13)
- Eddie Howard Jr. – synth bass (1), keyboards (10, 12)
- Michael Williams – drum overdubs (1), drums (2, 10), drum programming (7, 13), cymbal overdubs (7, 13)

Additional Musicians

- Paul Allen – keyboard programming (1, 8)
- Dave Ward – keyboard programming (1, 8), drum programming (1)
- Eric Dawkins – arrangements (1), keyboards (2, 9)
- Valdez Brantley – keyboards (3, 5), drum programming (3, 5)
- Bernard Wright – keyboards (6, 8–10), keyboard bass (6), drum programming (6)
- Randy Poole – keyboard programming (8)
- Anson Dawkins – drum programming (1, 3, 8, 9), vocal arrangements (3)
- Skip Pruitt – saxophone (7, 13)
- Parkes Stewart – vocal arrangements (3, 5)
- Transformation Crusade – rap (6)

== Production ==
- Dan Cleary – executive producer
- Fred Hammond – executive producer, producer (1, 2, 4, 6–13)
- Maxx Frank – co-producer (1, 2, 4, 7–11, 13)
- Mitchell Jones – producer (3, 5, 12)
- Bernard Wright – producer (6)
- John Jaszcz – engineer, mix engineer
- Dave Ward – engineer (1)
- Randy Poole – engineer (2, 4, 6, 7, 10–13)
- Mike Grace – engineer (3, 5)
- Scott Morgan – engineer (5)
- Kevin Wright – engineer (6, 10), additional engineer
- Eric Morgeson – engineer (10), additional engineer
- Raymond Hammond – sampling
- Connie Harrington – art direction
- Joel Anderson – cover concept, design
- David Thomas – cover concept, design
- Russ Harrington –photography
