= State of Mind (Commissioned album) =

Studio album by Commissioned
- Released: November 20, 1990
- Studio: Studio A (Dearborn Heights, Michigan)
- Genre: Gospel music
- Length: 53:03
- Label: Verity Records
- Producer: Michael Brooks; Fred Hammond

Commissioned chronology
| Ordinary Just Won't Do (1989) | State of Mind (1990) | Number 7 (1991) |

State of Mind is the sixth album by American contemporary gospel music group Commissioned, released in 1990 on Benson Records. It was the last album with the original line-up of the group before lead vocalist Keith Staten and songwriter/producer/keyboardist Michael Brooks left the group to pursue solo careers.

Sonically, the album builds onto the urban contemporary production style showcased in previous albums. The songwriting contains messages that both encourage Christians and invite unbelievers to trust Christ,

Domestically, the album peaked at number 4 on the US Billboard Top Gospel albums chart and number 19 on the Billboard Top Contemporary Christian chart.

The album contains the classic, “I am Here”, an R&B gospel ballad with first person lyrics from God’s point of view.

== Track listing ==
1. "He Set Me Free" (Michael Brooks) – 5:00
2. "One Step After Another" (Fred Hammond) – 4:46
3. "I Am Here" (Mitchell Jones, Parkes Stewart) – 5:03
4. "At the Point of Your Need" (Brooks) – 4:23
5. "I Will Never Leave You" (Jones, Stewart) – 4:56
6. "Back to My First Love" (Brooks) – 4:41
7. "The Way You Love Me" (Hammond) – 5:09
8. "If God Is for Us" (Hammond) – 4:55
9. "Let Me Tell It" (Hammond) – 4:35
10. "Everlasting Love" (Karl Reid) – 5:01
11. "Somebody's Watchin' You" (Brooks) – 4:34

== Personnel ==
Commissioned

- Fred Hammond – vocals, synthesizers, bass guitar, drum programming
- Mitchell Jones – vocals, keyboards, synthesizers
- Karl Reid – vocals
- Keith Staten – vocals
- Michael Brooks – keyboards
- Michael Williams – drums

Additional Musicians

- John Jaszcz – Synclavier programming
- Randy Poole – Synclavier programming
- Eric Brice – guitars
- Randy Jacobs – guitars, sitar
- Dave McMurray – saxophones
- Parkes Stewart – backing vocals

=== Production ===
- Michael Brooks – producer
- Fred Hammond – producer
- John Jaszcz – engineer, mix engineer
- Eric Morgeson – engineer
- Randy Poole – engineer
- Keith Clayton – assistant engineer
- Ray Hammond – assistant engineer
- Tom Lucio – assistant engineer
- Russ Harrington – photography
- Connie Harrington – art coordinator
- Joel Anderson – design
- Robert Pugh – stylist
