= Free to Worship =

Live album by Fred Hammond
- Released: October 31, 2006
- Recorded: April 14, 2006
- Venue: The Potters House Dallas, Texas
- Genre: CCM, contemporary gospel
- Length: 70:45
- Label: Verity Records

Fred Hammond chronology
Somethin' 'bout Love (2004)	Free to Worship (2006)	Love Unstoppable (2009)

Professional ratings
Review scores
Source	Rating
AllMusic	4/5 stars
USA Today	3.5/4 stars

Free to Worship is the ninth album from contemporary gospel singer Fred Hammond. The album was recorded on April 14, 2006, and released on October 31, 2006 through Verity Records.

== Track listing ==
1. "My Heart Is for You" (Fred Hammond, Rodrick Long) - 5:04
2. "He'll Do It!" (Hammond, Jason Jordan) - 5:33
3. "Lord Your Grace" (Derek "DC" Clark, Hammond) - 5:32
4. "This Is the Day" (Everett Jr. Williams) - 4:49
5. "More of You" (PamKenyon M. Donald, Hammond, Jerome Harmon, Ericka Warren, Caltomeesh "Candy" West) - 5:05
6. "Every Time I Think" (Patrick Dopson, Hammond, Bobby Sparks) - 5:11
7. "Keep on Praisin'" (Donald, Hammond, Sparks, Warren, West) - 5:57
8. "No Greater Love" (Noel Hall, Hammond, Kim Rutherford) - 6:11
9. "L.O.U.D. L.O.U.D." (Hammond) - 6:00
10. "There Is No Place" (Warren Campbell, Hammond) - 3:19
11. "Thank You (I Won't Complain)" (Donald, Hammond, Shelton Summons, Warren) - 6:15
12. "Simply Put" (Hammond, Hallerin Hilton Hill) - 6:38
13. "And We Worship You" (Hammond, Long) - 5:11

== Credits ==
Producer:

- Fred Hammond

Executive Producers:

- Fred Hammond
- Max Siegel

Arrangers:

- Calvin Rodgers - Arranger
- Fred Hammond - Arranger, Horn Arrangements, Vocal Arrangements

Worship Leader:

- Fred Hammond

Musicians:

- Jason "JT" Thomas-Drums
- Calvin Rodgers – Drums, Music Director
- Shelton Summons – Fender Rhodes
- Steve Goldsmith - Keyboards
- Kermit Wells - Keyboards
- Darius Fentress - Percussion, Drum Programming
- Darryl Dixon - Guitar
- Steve Lewis III - Flute, Keyboards, Strings
- Jerome Harmon - Keyboards
- Shaun Martin - Fender Rhodes
- Maxx Frank - Organ
- Warryn Campbell - Piano
- Todd Parsnow – Guitar
- Jason Jordan – Keyboards
- Tim Pitchford – Trombone
- Matt Cappy – Trumpet
- Charles Laster, Jr. - Keyboards
- Fred Hammond – Bass, Flute, Strings, Drum Programming, Keyboards
- Bobby Sparks - Organ, Keyboards, Moog Synthesizer
- Rodrick Long - Organ, Keyboards,

Vocals:

- Davey Hammond
- Tillunda Lawson
- Michael Bethany
- Lisa Robinson
- Frank Lawson
- Nakisha Bethany
- Dynna Wilson Wells
- Adrian Smith
- Kari Wilson
- Ericka Warren
- Pamkenyon Donald
- Candy West
- Candace Laster Jones
- Charles Laster, Jr.

Engineers

- Chris Athens - Mastering
- Darius Fentress - Assistant Engineer
- Steve Lewis III - Engineer
- Fred Hammond - Engineer, Mixing,
- Ray Hammond - Engineer, Mixing, Mixing Engineer, Sound Reinforcement, Sound Technician
- John Jaszcz - Engineer
- Timothy Powell - Engineer
- Chris Godbey - Engineer
- Kevin Wilson - Audio Engineer

== Awards ==
At the 38th GMA Dove Awards, Free to Worship was nominated for a Dove Award for Contemporary Gospel Album of the Year.

== Chart performance ==
The album peaked at #1 on Billboard's Christian and Gospel Albums charts. It spent 46 weeks on the latter
