= Matters of the Heart (Commissioned album) =

Matters Of The Heart

Studio album by Commissioned
- Released: January 25, 1994
- Genre: Gospel music
- Length: 65:44
- Label: Benson Records
- Producer: Fred Hammond; Maxx Frank; Mitchell Jones; Bryan Lenox

Commissioned chronology
Number 7 (1991)	Matters Of The Heart (1994)	Irreplaceable Love (1996)

Matters Of The Heart is the eighth album by American contemporary gospel music group Commissioned, released in 1994 on Benson Records. It was the last album with Fred Hammond and Michael Williams, both of whom left after this album.

Domestically, the album peaked at number 7 on the US Billboard Top Gospel albums chart, number 13 on the Billboard Top Contemporary Christian chart and number 65 on the Billboard Hot R&B/Hip-Hop Songs chart.

== Track listing ==
1. "Work on Me Jesus” (Anson Dawkins, Fred Hammond, Mitchell Jones) – 5:00
2. "Stand" (Hammond, Jones) – 4:56
3. "Love Is the Way" (Hammond, Chuckii Booker, Mark Luckey) – 6:27
4. "Dare to Believe" (Jones, Luckey) – 6:20
5. "Another Day in Paradise" (Phil Collins) – 6:58
6. "You Can Always Come Home" (Booker, Hammond, Jones, Darryl McDaniels, Joseph Simmons) – 5:42
7. "When Love Calls You Home" (Hammond, Ty Lacy, Bryan Lenox) – 4:32
8. "Lay Your Troubles Down" (Hammond, Luckey, Maxx Frank) – 6:18
9. "Find Myself in You" (Lacy, Lenox) – 4:06
10. "I'm Learning" (Jones, Parkes Stewart) – 4:55
11. "We Shall Behold Him" (Dottie Rambo) – 6:34
12. "Draw Me Nearer" (Fanny Crosby, William Howard Doane) – 3:56

== Personnel ==
- Fred Hammond: vocals, bass, drum programming, key bass, keyboards, programming
- Karl Reid: vocals
- Marvin Sapp: vocals
- Mitchell Jones: vocals
- Maxx Frank: keyboards, programming, Hammond B-3 organ
- Michael Williams: drums

Additional Musicians

- Noel Hall: keyboards
- Tim Bowman: guitar
- Bo Cooper: piano
- Bryan Lenox: strings, bells, oboe programming, synth bass, drums, percussion, keyboards
- Dann Huff: guitar
- Chuckii Booker: all instruments
- Danny Duncan: programming
- Marty Paoletta: saxophone
- Parkes Stewart: additional background vocals
- Eric Dawkins of Dawkins & Dawkins: additional background vocals
- Run-DMC: rap on 'You Can Always Come Home'
