= Keith Staten =

American gospel musician (born 1964)

- Born: Keith Anthony Staten; January 25, 1964 (age 62); Detroit, Michigan
- Origin: Orlando, Florida
- Genres: CCM, gospel, traditional black gospel, urban contemporary gospel
- Occupations: Singer, songwriter
- Instruments: Vocals, singer-songwriter
- Years active: 1990–present
- Labels: Lection, Glorious, Word, Epic, RiverPhlo
- Formerly of: Commissioned
- Website: keithstaten.com

Keith Anthony Staten (born January 25, 1964) is an American gospel musician. He started his solo music career, in 1990, with the release of, From the Heart, by Lection Records. This was his breakthrough release upon the Billboard magazine Gospel Albums chart. His subsequent album, No Greater Love, was released in 1995 by Glorious Music, but it failed to chart. The third album, Worship in the House, was released by Word Records in tandem with Epic Records in 1996, and this album charted on the Christian Albums chart. He released, Glory in the House, in 1995 with the aforementioned labels, however this time around it charted on the Gospel Albums chart.

== Early life ==
Staten was born as Keith Anthony Staten, on January 25, 1964, in the city of Detroit, Michigan, whose father was a pastor.

== Music career ==
Keith Staten was the lead vocalist for Commissioned from 1982 until 1990, when he left to pursue his solo career. The first solo album, From the Heart, was released on August 21, 1990, by Lection Records, and this album was his breakthrough release upon the Billboard magazine Gospel Albums chart at No. 25. He released, No Greater Love, on March 21, 1995, with Glorious Music, however this album did not place on any charts. His third album, Worship in the House, was released by Word Records alongside Epic Records on November 5, 1996, and this album placed on the Billboard magazine Christian Albums chart at No. 29. The latest album, Glory in the House, was released on April 20, 1999, by the aforementioned record labels, and this time around the album charted on the Gospel Albums chart at No. 17.

== Personal life ==
Staten has been married to his wife for over 25 years, Marketa, and together they have a mid-twenties aged son, Anthony, which they reside in Orlando, Florida.

== Discography ==
List of studio albums, with selected chart positions
| Title | Album details | Peak chart positions | |
| Title | Album details | US Chr | US Gos |
|---|---|---|---|
| From the Heart | Released: August 21, 1990; Label: Lection; CD, digital download | – | 25 |
| No Greater Love | Released: March 21, 1995; Label: Glorious; CD, digital download | – | – |
| Worship in the House | Released: November 5, 1996; Label: Epic/Word; CD, digital download | 29 | – |
| Glory in the House | Released: April 20, 1999; Label: Epic/Word; CD, digital download | – | 17 |
