= Montrell Darrett =

American singer (born 1969)

Montrel Darrett
- Origin: United States of America
- Genres: Urban Soul, R&B, Former Gospel

Montrel Darrett (born as Charles Joseph Montrel Darrett on November 4, 1969 in Evansville, IN) is an American singer. He is the founder and CEO of Urban Icon Entertainment VII. Darrett served 8 years in the U.S. Navy and is a Persian Gulf War veteran. He is a former member of the award-winning gospel performing group Commissioned. As a member of Commissioned, Darrett was a four-time Stellar Award nominee. He wrote and produced the #1 selling Commissioned song to date Until My Change Comes. Darrett also sang with gospel artist, John. P. Kee, where he led the single Be Encouraged on the Show Up project, which became Pastor Kee's first gold selling record.

Darrett is the fourth of six children, all of whom sang. They grew up in Nashville, TN and performed as The Gospel True Notes. Darrett was known for his rendition of Walk Around Heaven from their self-titled debut record with Chanita Records. As a teenager, Darrett recorded several singles. Darrett comes from a lineage of legendary entertainers including Moses Gunn, The Fairfield Four, and singer Deniece Williams.

In 1999, Darrett released a solo album, Chronicles of the Soul. The album hit No. 23 on the Billboard Top Gospel Albums chart. In 2000, Darrett received a Canadian Grammy for writing Canadian gospel artist Sharon Riley’s hit single Life Is.

Darrett's achievements include an ASCAP Writers Award, presented by Jimmy Jam and Terry Lewis, a gold and platinum recipient for Chronicles of the Soul, and a BMI Honorary Award for his work with Commissioned. In 1999, Darrett received a Soul Train Award nomination for New Male Gospel Artist of the Year and also a GMA Dove Award nomination for Male Vocalist of the Year. Darrett has performed and recorded with greats such as Boyz II Men, Dave Hollister, Jodeci, Brandy Norwood, Kirk Franklin, Guy, and Kim Burrell, to name a few.

After time away from the music industry, Darrett returned with his first Urban Soul and R&B project, A SOUL CONVERSATION, from his label Urban Icon Entertainment VII. It will be released Fall 2022. Darrett is also preparing to release his first national independent feature film, Project Black/Colors of Soul, which will star Darrett and Dave Hollister.
