= Marcus Cole (musician) =

American musician (born 1971)

- Born: Marcus Randell Cole; November 9, 1971 (age 55); Saginaw, Michigan
- Origin: Detroit, Michigan
- Genres: Gospel, Christian R&B, urban gospel, black gospel
- Occupations: Singer, songwriter, worship leader
- Instruments: vocals, keyboards
- Years active: 1999–present
- Formerly of: Commissioned
- Website: riverphlo.com/artist/marcus-cole/

Marcus Randell Cole (born November 9, 1971) is an American gospel musician and worship leader, Christian R&B, urban gospel and black gospel recording artist and singer. He started his music career, in 1996, with the gospel music group, Commissioned until 2018. He has released two studio albums, Chillin' Up in Heaven, in 1999, with Godson Records, and, Write My Song, in 2006, from PureSprings Gospel. The second album was his breakthrough release, entering the Billboard magazine charts.

== Early life ==
Marcus Randell Cole was born on November 9, 1971, in Saginaw, Michigan, as the youngest in a family of five children. He graduated from Danville High School in Danville, Illinois, in 1989, where he wrote and performed their class song.

== Music career ==
Cole's music recording career began in 1999, with becoming a member in Commissioned, and the release of his first studio album, Chillin' Up in Heaven, with Godson Records, in September of that year. His second studio album, Write My Song, was released in August 2006, from PureSprings Gospel. This album was his breakthrough release upon the Billboard magazine charts, while it placed on the Gospel Albums chart, where it peaked at No. 34.

== Personal life ==
He currently lives with his family in West Haven, Connecticut, where he was the worship leader at Vertical Church.

== Discography ==
- Chillin' Up in Heaven (1999)
- Write My Song (2006)
