= The Commissioned Reunion Live =

Live album by Commissioned
- Released: April 23, 2002
- Recorded: October 26, 2001, Straight Gate International Church, Detroit, Michigan
- Genre: Gospel music
- Length: 118:50
- Label: Verity Records

Commissioned chronology
| Time and Seasons (1999) | The Commissioned Reunion Live (2002) | Praise & Worship (2006) |

The Commissioned Reunion Live is the 11th overall album and first live album by the American contemporary gospel music group Commissioned, released on April 23, 2002 via Verity Records.

Domestically, the album peaked at number 3 on the US Billboard Top Gospel albums chart and number 8 on the Billboard Top Contemporary Christian chart.

== Track listing ==
Disc 1 and 2

1. "Hype (Strange Land) [Live]" (1:06)
2. "Triumphant Entry [Live]" (2:59)
3. "You've Got A Friend [Live]" (2:32)
4. "I'm Going On [Live]" (4:16)
5. "You Keep on Blessing Me [Live]" (3:00)
6. "Back in the Saddle [Live]" (4:43)
7. "Go Tell Somebody [Live]" (4:29)
8. "Lord Jesus Help Me (Help Somebody Else) [Live]" (6:13)
9. "Everlasting Love [Live]" (3:53)
10. "Hold Me (Leaning) [Live]" (4:24)
11. "I Am Here [Live]" (4:05)
12. "King of Glory [Live]" (5:36)
13. "Let Me Tell It [Live]" (4:26)
14. "Lay Your Troubles Down [Live]" (3:57)
15. "Giving My Problems to You [Live]" (5:13)
16. "The City [Live]" (2:26)
17. "Cry On [Live]" (1:27)
18. "Love Isn't Love [Live]" (2:12)
19. "Ordinary Just Won't Do [Live]" (8:44)
20. "When Love Calls You Home [Live]" (3:15)
21. "Please You More [Live]" (2:37)
22. "Secret Place [Live]" (4:43)
23. "Find Myself in You [Live]" (2:11)
24. "Will You Be Ready? [Live]" (3:41)
25. "'Tis So Sweet [Live]" (3:47)
26. "Running Back to You [Live]" (7:15)
27. "So Good to Know (The Savior) [Live]" (6:08)
28. "Victory [Live]" (4:25)
29. "I Can't Live Without U [Live]" (6:07)
- There are two prologues in the beginning where they are freestyling, known as "Hype (Strange Land)" and "Triumphant Entry".

== Credits ==
Recorded live October 26, 2001 at Straight Gate International Church in Detroit, Michigan.

Producer:

- Fred Hammond
- Noel Hall
- Tommie Walker
- Marcus Cole

Executive producer:

- Fred Hammond

Arrangers:

- Noel Hall – arranger, horn arrangements
- Marvin Thompson – horn arrangements
- Tommie Walker – arranger
- Fred Hammond – arranger, horn arrangements, vocal arrangements
- Luther Hanes – arranger

Worship leaders: Commissioned

- Fred Hammond
- Mitchell Jones
- Karl Reid
- Marcus Cole
- Marvin Sapp
- Keith Staten

Musicians:

- Noel Hall – keyboard, organ, piano, (MD)
- Marvin McQuitty – drums
- Michael Williams – drums
- Darius Fentress – percussion
- Darryl Dixon – electric guitar
- Fred Hammond – bass guitar
- Joey Woolfalk – acoustic guitar
- Earl Wright – keyboard
- Tommie Walker – drum programming, keyboard programming
- Luther Hanes – synthesizer bass
- Mo' Horns includes:
- Randolph Ellis – saxophone
- Marvin Thompson – trombone
- Clifton Brockington – trumpet

Radical For Christ (additional vocals):

- Pamkenyon Donald
- Davey Hammond
- Marsha D. Johns
- Bryan Pratt
- Frederick Purifoy II
- JoAnn Rosario
- Danielle Stephens

Engineers

- Chris Athens – mastering
- Darius Fentress – assistant engineer
- Dan Glomski – assistant remote engineer
- Fred Hammond – engineer, mixing,
- Ray Hammond – engineer, mixing, mixing engineer, sound reinforcement, sound technician
- John Jaszcz – engineer
- Timothy Powell – engineer
- Greg Snyder – sound reinforcement
- Kevin Wilson – engineer, mixing engineer

Production coordinators:

- PamKenyon Donald – production coordination
- Marsha D. Johns – production administrator
- Bryan Pratt – production administrator
