= Melvin Williams (musician) =

American gospel musician (born 1953)

- Born: Melvin LeVarn Williams; July 21, 1953 (age 73); Smithdale, Mississippi, U.S.
- Origin: Jackson, Mississippi, U.S.
- Genres: gospel, traditional black gospel, roots gospel
- Occupations: Singer, songwriter, producer, musician
- Instruments: vocals, acoustic guitar
- Years active: 1988–present
- Labels: Blackberry, Compendia, Melvin Williams Entertainment / New Day Christian
- Formerly of: The Williams Brothers, The Melvin Williams Group
- Website: facebook.com/pages/Official-Melvin-Williams/136936143024621

Melvin LeVarn Williams (born July 21, 1953) is an American gospel musician. He started his solo music career, in 1988, with the release of, Back to the Cross, that was released by Compendia Music Group. His second album, In Living Color – LIVE, was released in 1992, with the backing of Blackberry Records releasing the project. His third album, Never Seen Your Face, was released in 1998, His fourth album, Duets, was released in 2001. His fifth album Crazy Like Love, and sixth album, Love Like Crazy, was released on the same date in 2007. His seventh album, The Best of Melvin Williams, was released in 2009. And his eighth album, Where I Started From, was released in 2017 with his vanity label, Melvin Williams Entertainment's partnership with New Day Christian Distributors. All of these albums, charted on the Billboard Gospel Albums chart.

== Early life ==
Williams was born on July 21, 1953, in Smithdale, Mississippi, as Melvin LeVarn Williams, the son of Leon "Pop" Williams (November 24, 1909 – September 6, 1989), he died in a car accident, and Amanda "Mom" Williams (September 28, 1919 – August 30, 2014), she died at the age of 94. His older brother is Leonard, his younger brother is Doug Williams, and his other brother was the late Frank Williams. Together Melvin and Doug operate Blackberry Records, Inc., The Williams Brother's record label.

== Music career ==
He is one part of The Williams Brothers, that was founded in 1960 by his father. He started his solo music career in 1988, with the release of Back to the Cross by Compendia Music Group, which charted at No. 6 on the Billboard Gospel Albums chart. In 1998 Never Seen Your Face, was released by Blackberry Records on April 7, 1998, and this would chart on the Gospel Albums chart at No. 34. Tony Cummings, indicating in a ten out of ten review by Cross Rhythms, recognizes, Williams is "a brilliant singer able to wrench every last piece of emotion out of songs that defy the depressing obsession with cheap sex of much secular R&B preferring instead lyrics of transcendent love of God." The fifth and sixth albums came out on the same date in 2007, Crazy Like Love and Love Like Crazy, that was released on February 6, 2007, by Blackberry Records. Both of these albums would simultaneously chart on the Gospel Albums chart, with the former charting at No. 17 and the latter at No. 32.

In 2017, New Day Christian Distributors partnered with the Grammy Award Nominated Artist Melvin Williams and his vanity label Melvin Williams Entertainment (MWE) on his highly anticipated new studio recording, Where I Started From. The project, released in July 2017, is the seventh studio album released by the chart-topping artist and features 12 new tracks, including the Top-20 new single track, "Claim It Now." The album peak position No. 9 on the Christian Soundscan Chart and No. 18 on the Top 20 Billboard Charts.Billboard Gospel Albums

For more than 58 years, Melvin Williams played the guitar in vassapoo - playing a right-handed guitar upside down and backwards with his left hand. He is part of a group of musicians/artists, e.g., Kenny "Babyface" Edmonds, Al McKay (formerly of Earth Wind & Fire), Jonathan Butler, Billy Ray Cyrus, Cesar Rosas (formerly of Los Lobos), Dick Dale (the King of Surfer Music), Kurt Cobain, Bobby Womack, Seal, Jimi Hendrix, Justin Bieber, and Albert King, to name a few.

As US Music Ambassador for the U.S. Department of State Bureau of Educational and Cultural Affairs and Jazz at Lincoln Center's "The Rhythm Road: American Music Abroad", Melvin Williams tours internationally hosting Master Class at American Corners and performing concerts at various Performing Arts Theatres, Festivals, Music Conservatories, such as, the Usadba Jazz Festival in Moscow, Russia; the Baku Jazz Center in Baku, Azerbaijan; the Turkmenistan Cinema and Concert Hall in Ashgabat, Turkmenistan; the International Jazz Festival in Chelyabinsk, Club 33 Amphitheatre in Tbilisi Vake Park in Tbilisi, Georgia. In 1950's, the US State Department Ambassadors program began with American Jazz musicians such as Louis Armstrong, Dizzy Gillespie, Benny Goodman and Duke Ellington to foster a mutual understanding between the U.S. and other nations through American music and culture. And in 2009, the Ambassador program expanded to all other genres of music.

Melvin Williams' extension of his Ambassadorship continues today through his "Preserve Traditional Gospel Music: Where I Started From" tour that is currently touring the U.S. and a planned tour of Europe, Australia, Japan, Canada, and South America.

=== Grammy Awards ===
Year	Nominated work	Category	Result
1988	"Back To The Cross"	Grammy Award for Best Soul Gospel Performance, Male	Nominated
1991	"This Is Your Night"	Grammy Award for Best Traditional Soul Gospel Album	Nominated
1994	"In This Place"	Grammy Award for Best Traditional Soul Gospel Album	Nominated
2000	The Concert	Grammy Award for Best Traditional Soul Gospel Album	Nominated
2004	Still Here	Grammy Award for Best Traditional Soul Gospel Album	Nominated
2009	The Journey Continues	Grammy Award for Best Traditional Gospel Album	Nominated

== Discography ==
List of studio albums, with selected chart positions
Title	Album details	Peak chart positions
Title	Album details	US Gos
Back to the Cross	Released: September 20, 1988; Label: Compendia; CD, digital download	6
In Living Color – LIVE	Released: 1993; Label: Blackberry; CD, digital download	6
Never Seen Your Face	Released: April 7, 1998; Label: Blackberry; CD, digital download	34
Duets	Released: 2001; Label: Blackberry; CD, digital download	11
Crazy Like Love	Released: February 6, 2007; Label: Blackberry; CD, digital download	17
Love Like Crazy	Released: February 6, 2007; Label: Blackberry; CD, digital download	32
The Best of Melvin Williams	Released: 2009; Label: Blackberry; CD, digital download	
Where I Started From	Released: July 28, 2017; Label: Melvin Williams Entertainment, LLC / New Day Christian; CD, digital download	9
