= Doug Williams (musician) =

- Born: Douglas LeAllen Williams; September 3, 1956 (age 69); Smithdale, Mississippi
- Origin: Jackson, Mississippi
- Genres: gospel, urban contemporary gospel
- Occupations: Singer, songwriter
- Instrument: vocals
- Years active: 1995–present
- Labels: Blackberry, Orchard
- Formerly of: The Williams Brothers
- Website: blackberryrecords.com

Douglas LeAllen Williams (born September 3, 1956) is an American singer and songwriter. He started his solo music career, in 1995, with the release of gospel album, Heartsongs, that was released by Blackberry Records. The album got him a Grammy Award nomination at the 38th Annual Grammy Awards for the Best Contemporary R&B Gospel Album. His second album, When Mercy Found Me, was released in 2003, with the backing of Blackberry Records releasing the project. His third album, Good Graces, was released in 2005 by Orchard Records. The first two of these album charted on the Billboard Gospel Albums chart.

== Early life ==
Williams was born on September 3, 1956, in Smithdale, Mississippi, as Douglas LeAllen Williams, the son of Leon "Pop" Williams (1908/1909 – 1989), he died in a car accident, and Amanda "Mom" Williams (b:1919 – D:August 30, 2014), she died at the age of 94. He is the youngest sibling and younger brother of Melvin Williams, and the late Franklin Delano Williams.

== Music career ==
He is one part of The Williams Brothers, that was founded in 1960 by his father. He started his solo music career in 1995, with the release of Heartsongs by Blackberry Records, which charted at No. 16 on the Billboard Gospel Albums chart. This album got him a Grammy Award nomination in the Best Contemporary R&B Gospel Album category at the 38th Annual Grammy Awards. His second album, 2003's When Mercy Found Me, was released by Blackberry Records on January 21, 2003, and this would chart on the Gospel Albums chart at No. 28. Trevor Kirk, indicating in a seven out of ten review by Cross Rhythms, realizes, it is "Very enjoyable." The third album came out on October 25, 2005, by Orchard Records, Good Graces, and this failed to chart. Doug continues to live in Mississippi, where he serves as President & chief executive officer of Blackberry Records, Inc., the Williams Brothers’ record label in McComb, Miss.

== Discography ==
List of studio albums, with selected chart positions
Title	Album details	Peak chart positions
Title	Album details	US Gos
Heartsongs	Released: 1995; Label: Blackberry; CD, digital download	16
When Mercy Found Me	Released: January 21, 2003; Label: Blackberry; CD, digital download	28
Good Graces	Released: October 25, 2005; Label: Orchard; CD, digital download	–
Crossover	Released: May 6, 2016; Label: Blackberry; CD, digital download	11
