= The Williams Brothers (gospel group) =

American traditional black gospel music group

- Also known as: The Sensational Williams Brothers; The Williams Brothers Gospel
- Origin: Smithdale, Mississippi
- Genres: Gospel, urban contemporary gospel, traditional black gospel, southern gospel
- Years active: 1960–present
- Labels: Word, Nashboro, Savoy, CBS, New Birth, Malaco, A&M, Melendo, Blackberry, Compendia, Warner Bros., Myrrh, MCA
- Members: Doug Williams; Melvin Williams; Henry Green
- Past members: Leon "Pop" Williams; Leonard Williams; Frank Douglas; Maurice Surrell; Derrick Horne; Maulty "Tuff" Jewell IV; Pharis "June Bug" Evans Jr. Ralph Lofton; Terrell Midge Gatlin
- Website: facebook.com/pages/The-Williams-Brothers-Gospel/112810295415347

The Williams Brothers is an American traditional black gospel music group from Jackson, Mississippi, they were formed in 1960 by Leon "Pop" Williams, who was the Williams' father, and early on the Williams' brother Frank Douglas was a member. At its inception, The group consisted of three brothers, Doug Williams, Leonard Williams, Melvin Williams, and their cousin, Henry Green and a non-family member Maurice Surrell. Later on the group would add Derrick Horne, Maulty "Tuff" Jewell IV, Pharis "June Bug" Evans Jr., Ralph Lofton Jr., and Terrell Midge Gatlin. They released 42 albums with various labels during their tenure, and 23 albums charted on the Billboard charts, mostly on the Gospel Albums chart. They have been nominated for the Grammy Award in the Best Traditional Gospel Album category at the 34th, 37th, 43rd, 47th, and the 52nd Annual Grammy Awards. In 1999, the group was inducted into the International Gospel Music Hall of Fame, which is in Detroit, Michigan.

== Background ==
The Jackson, Mississippi-based traditional black gospel group, The Williams Brothers started in 1960 by Leon "Pop" Williams (November 24, 1908/1909 – September 6, 1989), who was the father of the Williams Brothers and an early member of the group, died in a car accident. Another early member of the group was Franklin Delano Williams (born June 27, 1947 and Died: March 22, 1993, Savannah, GA). At their origination, they were made up of three brothers, Doug Williams, Leonard Williams (born July 1, 1951), Melvin Williams, and their cousin, Henry Green. Over the years, the group added Derrick Horne, Maulty "Tuff" Jewell IV, Pharis "June Bug" Evans Jr., Ralph Lofton, and Terrell Midge Gatlin to their rostrum.

== History ==
The group released 42 albums with a myriad of labels from 1960 until 2014, and those labels were the following: Word Records, Nashboro Records, Savoy Records, CBS Records International, New Birth Records, Malaco Records, A&M Records, Melendo Records, Blackberry Records, Compendia Records, Warner Bros. Records, Myrrh Records, and MCA Records. They have had 23 albums chart on the Billboard magazine charts, mainly on the Gospel Albums chart, and those were the following: Feel the Spirit, Blessed, Hand in Hand, A New Beginning, Ain't Love Wonderful, The Is Your Night, The Williams Brothers Greatest Hits Volume 1, The Williams Brothers, The Best Of And More "Live", In This Place, Still Standing, The Concert, Still Here, SoulLink Live, Greatest Hits Plus, Soullink Live 3: Man in the Mirror, On Broken Pieces: A Hurricane Relief Effort, The Journey Continues, My Brother's Keeper, Celebrating 50 Years, Live At The Hard Rock: Part I, My Brother's Keeper II, and Songs Of Worship, Praise & Deliverance. The group has received five Grammy Award nominations during their tenure in the Best Traditional Gospel Album category, at the 34th edition for the album This Is Your Night, at the 37th edition for In This Place, at the 43rd edition for The Concert, at the 47th edition for Still Here, and at the 52nd edition for The Journey Continues. In 1999, the group was inducted into the International Gospel Music Hall of Fame, which is located in Detroit, Michigan.

== Members ==
=== Current members ===
- Andre "Dray" Tate
- Doug Williams
- Melvin Williams
- Henry Green (born March 23, 1943, Smithville, Mississippi) (died February 4, 2024)

=== Former members ===
- Leon "Pop" Williams
- Leonard Williams
- Franklin Delano Williams
- Maurice Surrell
- Derrick Horne
- Maulty "Tuff" Jewell IV
- Pharis "June Bug" Evans Jr.
- Ralph Lofton
- Terrell Midge Gatlin
- AJ Walker

== Discography ==
(*) – Denotes a Grammy Award nomination, for that particular album

List of selected albums, with selected chart positions
Title	Album details	Peak chart positions
Title	Album details	US Gos
Feel the Spirit	Released: 1983; Label: Myrrh; CD, digital download	3
Blessed	Released: 1985; Label: Malaco; CD, digital download	1
Hand in Hand	Released: 1986; Label: Malaco; CD, digital download	2
A New Beginning	Released: 1988; Label: Melendo; CD, digital download	4
Ain't Love Wonderful	Released: 1990; Label: Malaco; CD, digital download	6
This Is Your Night*	Released: 1991; Label: Blackberry; CD, digital download	4
The Williams Brothers Greatest Hits Volume 1	Released: 1991; Label: Blackberry; CD, digital download	33
The Best Of And More "Live"	Released: 1993; Label: Blackberry; CD, digital download	16
In This Place*	Released: 1994; Label: Malaco/Blackberry; CD, digital download	1
Still Standing	Released: 1997; Label: Blackberry; CD, digital download	15
The Concert*	Released: 2000; Label: Blackberry; CD, digital download	21
Still Here*	Released: 2003; Label: Blackberry; CD, digital download	15
SoulLink Live	Released: 2004; Label: Blackberry; CD, digital download	9
Greatest Hits Plus	Released: 2005; Label: Blackberry; CD, digital download	26
Soullink Live 3: Man In The Mirror	Released: 2006; Label: Blackberry; CD, digital download	36
On Broken Pieces: A Hurricane Relief Effort	Released: 2006; Label: Blackberry; CD, digital download	27
The Journey Continues*	Released: 2009; Label: Blackberry; CD, digital download	16
Celebrating 50 Years	Released: 2010; Label: Blackberry; CD, digital download	24
Live At The Hard Rock - Part I	Released: 2011; Label: Blackberry; CD, digital download	21
My Brother's Keeper II	Released: 2013; Label: Blackberry; CD, digital download	18
Songs of Worship, Praise & Deliverance	Released: 2014; Label: Blackberry; CD, digital download	16
Timeless	Released: 2017; Label: Blackberry; CD, digital download	13

== Concept music videos ==
- "I'm Just a Nobody"
- "Sweep Around"
- "I'm Too Close" (featuring Stevie Wonder)
- "Still Here"
- "Move in Me"
- "Use Me" (featuring Tim Rogers, Stan Jones and Lisa Knowles)
