= Smithdale, Mississippi =

- Unincorporated community
- Location within Mississippi Location within the United States
- Coordinates: 31°20′23″N 90°40′58″W
- Country: United States
- State: Mississippi
- County: Amite
- Elevation: 469 ft (143 m)
- Time zone: UTC-6 (Central (CST))
  - Summer (DST): UTC-5 (CDT)
- ZIP code: 39664
- Area code: 601
- GNIS feature ID: 666423

Smithdale is an unincorporated community located in Amite County, Mississippi, United States. Smithdale is approximately 5.6 miles (9.0 km) south-southwest of Auburn on Mississippi Highway 570 and a part of the McComb, Mississippi Micropolitan Statistical Area.

Smithdale has a post office with a zip code of 39664.

== Notable people ==
- Britte Hughey, member of the Mississippi House of Representatives 1956–1964
- Doug Williams, gospel singer
- Franklin Delano Williams, gospel singer
- Melvin Williams, gospel musician
