= Commissioned (gospel group) =

American urban contemporary gospel group

- Origin: Detroit, Michigan, U.S.
- Genres: Gospel, contemporary Christian, contemporary worship, urban gospel
- Years active: 1983–2006, 2011, 2013, 2017–present
- Labels: Light; Benson; Verity; Intersound; Platinum
- Members: Parkes Stewart; Mitchell Jones; Karl Reid; Michael Williams
- Past members: Fred Hammond; Marvin Sapp; Keith Staten; Maxx Frank; Montrell Darrett; Chris Poole (deceased); Eddie Howard, Jr. Michael Brooks (deceased); Marcus Cole

Commissioned is an American urban contemporary gospel group from Detroit, Michigan. Members included Michael Brooks, Fred Hammond, Keith Staten, Karl Reid, Mitchell Jones, Marvin Sapp, Marcus Cole

The group recorded twelve albums over a period of 17 years, and were nominated for Grammy and Stellar awards.

== Group history ==
The group originates from Detroit, Michigan. The six original members were Fred Hammond, Mitchell Jones, Keith Staten, Karl Reid, Michael Brooks and Michael Williams. The group formed in 1982, two years after Hammond played bass for The Winans. In 1990, Staten and Brooks left the group and were replaced with Marvin Sapp, Maxx Frank and Eddie Howard, Jr. By 1994, Howard had left the group, and Williams left a year later. Hammond also left to pursue a career with the choir Radical For Christ. He was replaced by Montrell Darrett. By 1999, Marcus Cole and Chris Poole had taken the place of Sapp, Frank and Darrett on the group's last studio album.

The R&B group Silk covered the Commissioned ballad "Cry On" on the movie soundtrack for Blankman (1994).

In 2002, Commissioned released a reunion album, which was recorded live at the Straightgate Church in Detroit, Michigan, on October 26, 2001. Most of the group's former members reunited, and featured most of its greatest hits.

The group performed live on stage during the 2002 Stellar Awards in Atlanta, Georgia.

In 2011, they were honored at the BMI Awards after the Stellar Awards. Gospel artists sang musical tributes, including: Dawkins & Dawkins, Deitrick Haddon, Marvin Sapp, The Soul Seekers, The Clark Sisters and Men of Standard. The members who were present at the event were Hammond, Staten, Sapp, Jones, Reid, Williams, Frank, Darrett, Cole and Brooks. The group sang "Victory" from their sophomore record, Go Tell Somebody.

Hammond, Brooks, Staten, Sapp, Reid, Jones, and Williams performed another reunion concert in 2019. It was hosted by the Pentecostal Assemblies of the World Incorporated. The group was invited to perform to celebrate the 104th Summer Convention of the P.A.W. Inc.

== Discography ==
=== Albums ===
Release date	Album title
1985	I'm Going On
1986	Go Tell Somebody
1987	On The Winning Side
1988	Will You Be Ready?
1989	Ordinary Just Won't Do
1990	State of Mind
1991	Number 7
1991	A Collection
1994	Matters of the Heart
1995	The Light Years
1997	Irreplaceable Love
1999	The Best Of Commissioned
1999	Time & Seasons
2002	The Commissioned Reunion Live
2006	Praise & Worship
2006	The Definitive 16 Greatest Hits
2007	New Beginnings Gospel
2008	The Essential Commissioned
2008	Gospel Legacy
2008	Fred Hammond & Commissioned
2011	Setlist: The Very Best Of Commissioned Live
2012	Mad Beats for Happy People

=== Guest appearances ===
List of non-single songs with guest appearances by Commissioned
Title	Year	Album	Artist(s)
"Before It Falls Down"	2000	J2K - Jesus 2000	Various
"All Because of You"	2001	With This Ring	Various
"What Child is This"	2013	Christmas Card	Marvin Sapp
"Honor The King"	2013	Christmas Card	Marvin Sapp

=== Performance videos ===
Release date	Video / DVD title	Label
1991	In Concert (Live) (VHS)	Mercury Video
1998	Matters of the Heart (Video/Live) (VHS)	Verity Records
1998	Commissioned: Live in Concert (VHS)	Xenon Pictures
1998	Number 7 (VHS)	Verity Records
2002	The Commissioned Reunion: Live (video/DVD)	Verity Records
2005	The Winans: The Lost Concert (video/DVD)	Xenon Pictures

== Awards ==
=== Nominations ===
Year	Award-giving body	Award category	Song/album title
1989	Grammy Awards	Best Soul Gospel Performance - Duo, Group, Choir or Chorus	Will You Be Ready?
1991	Grammy Awards	Best Pop Gospel Album	Shakin' the House...Live - Carman & Commissioned (& the Christ Church Choir)
1994	Grammy Awards	Best Contemporary Soul Gospel Album	Matters of the Heart
2001	Stellar Awards	Contemporary Group/Duo of the Year	Time & Seasons
2002	Stellar Awards	Producer of the Year (Israel Humphrey)	Commissioned Reunion Live
2002	Stellar Awards	Group/Duo of the Year	Commissioned Reunion Live
2002	Stellar Awards	Contemporary Group/Duo of the Year	Commissioned Reunion Live
2002	Stellar Awards	Contemporary CD of the Year	Commissioned Reunion Live
2002	Stellar Awards	Special Event CD of the Year	Commissioned Reunion Live
2002	Grammy Awards	Best Contemporary Soul Gospel Album	Commissioned Reunion Live

== Members ==
- Fred Hammond: lead vocals, background vocals, bass guitar (1982-1994, 2001–2002, 2011, 2013, 2018–2022)
- Keith Staten: lead vocals, background vocals (1982-1990, 2001–2002, 2011, 2013, 2017–2024)
- Mitchell Jones: lead vocals, background vocals (1982-2002, 2011, 2013, 2017-present)
- Karl Reid: lead vocals, background vocals (1982-2002, 2011, 2013, 2017-present)
- Eddie Howard, Jr: keyboards (1990-1994)
- Marvin Sapp: lead vocals, background vocals (1990-1996, 2001–2002, 2011, 2013, 2018–2023)
- Michael Williams: drums (1982-1994, 2001–2002, 2011, 2018-present)
- Marcus Cole: lead vocals, background vocals (1996-2002, 2013, 2017–2019, 2022-2024)
- Michael Brooks: keyboards (1982-1990, 2018–2024) (died 2024)
- Montrell Darrett: lead vocals, background vocals (1995-1996)
- Chris Poole: lead vocals, backgrounds vocals (1999-2000) (deceased)
- Maxx Frank: keyboards, B3 organ, mixing (1990-1996)
- Parkes Stewart: lead vocals, background vocals (2023–present)
