= John Jaszcz =

John Jaszcz (Yaa-sh)
- Born: John Nicholas Jaszcz; February 26, 1954; Detroit, Michigan, U.S.
- Occupation(s): Engineer, producer, mixer
- Website: Official website Record label

John Jaszcz (pronounced "Yosh") is an American music engineer, producer, and mixer. "Yosh," as he has been nicknamed, currently lives and works in Franklin, Tennessee, south of Nashville He is a well-known engineer in R&B and gospel music. He has mixed albums for Kirk Franklin (won a Grammy award for his 2005 release Hero among other albums), Dorinda Clark Cole, Tye Tribbett, Israel Houghton, Kurt Carr, Hezekiah Walker, and Ledisi.

John Jaszcz got his start in Detroit as an engineer for records by Parliament-Funkadelic, Bootsy Collins, George Clinton, Zapp, and Commissioned. Jaszcz's move to Tennessee facilitated his involvement in country and rock music working with artists including Billy Ray Cyrus, John Michael Montgomery, and Collective Soul. Jaszcz's production credits include Sonicflood (produced with John Lawry), co-production with guitarist Dennis Coffey, and Jaszcz is involved in co-producing and mixing projects with the Nashville-based production company Zodlounge. In 2010, he began an independent record label, Yosh Bros Entertainment, as a platform for artists he produces. The roster includes Kree Woods and DJ Sahnik.

Jaszcz has won 8 Grammy Awards and multiple Dove Awards. Along with producer and music engineer John Mike, he released a second volume of a drum library (collection) featuring Kevin Kelley, a session drummer.

== Partial discography ==
- Kirk Franklin's album Fight of My Life, Hero, Rebirth, and Hello Fear
- Marvin Sapp's album Here I Am
- Andraé Crouch's album The Journey
- Donna Summer's album Crayons
- CeCe Winans' album Thy Kingdom Come
- Tye Tribbett's album Stand Out, and Fresh
- Dorinda Clark Cole's album Take It Back
- Israel and New Breed's album Friend of God
- Ledisi's album Lost and Found
- Roberta Flack's album Roberta
- The Shy's album All That Matters
- Kree Woods' albums Kree Woods and Chance Happening
- Hezekiah Walker's albums Live In Toronto, Live In Atlanta, and Live In New York
- Code of Ethics's album Code of Ethics and Arms Around the World

Full Discography available at AllMusic
