= WOW Gospel 2004 =

Compilation album by Various Artists
- Released: January 27, 2004
- Genre: CCM, Gospel
- Label: Verity Records

Various Artists chronology
WOW Gospel 2003 (2003)	WOW Gospel 2004 (2004)	WOW Gospel 2005 (2005)

Professional ratings
Review scores
Source	Rating
Allmusic	3/5 stars
Christianity Today	(favourable)

WOW Gospel 2004 is a gospel music compilation album from the WOW series. Released January 27, 2004, it includes thirty songs on a double CD album. It reached number 27 on the Billboard 200 chart in 2004, and hit number one on the Top Gospel Albums chart that year and also in 2006; it made number 19 on the Top R&B/Hip-Hop Albums chart in 2004. The album cover pays tribute to Houston, Texas.

In 2005 the album was certified as platinum in the US by the Recording Industry Association of America (RIAA).

== Track listing ==
=== Disc 1 ===
1. Brighter Day - Kirk Franklin - 5:41
2. I Almost Let Go - Kurt Carr & The Kurt Carr Singers - 5:41
3. You Are God Alone - Marvin Sapp - 5:31
4. You Are God - Darwin Hobbs - 5:52
5. Still Say Thank You (live) - Smokie Norful - 5:47
6. Doesn't Really Matter - Tonéx featuring Applejaxx - 3:48
7. It's Already Done - Bishop T.D. Jakes & The Potter's House Mass Choir - 5:15
8. Worthy - Virtue - 3:30
9. My Everything (Praise Waiteth) - Richard Smallwood/Vision - 5:48
10. Holy - Donnie McClurkin - 5:44
11. I Need You To Survive - Hezekiah Walker & The Love Fellowship Choir - 5:35
12. Bless Me (Prayer Of Jabez) - Donald Lawrence & The Tri-City Singers - 4:58
13. Wade In The Water - The Blind Boys Of Alabama - 3:33
14. Jesus - Debra Killings - 4:43

=== Disc 2 ===
1. You Are My Daily Bread - Fred Hammond - 4:21
2. Shake Yourself Loose - Vickie Winans - 4:46
3. I Won't Let Go - John P. Kee & New Life - 4:53
4. You Can't Hurry God - Dorinda Clark Cole - 5:42
5. Worship Medley (Joy Of The Lord/Oh The Glory) - Deitrick Haddon - 5:15
6. When I Enter Your Rest - Joann Rosario - 4:30
7. Exalted Praise - CeCe Winans presents The Born Again Church Choir - 4:25
8. There's Nothing Too Hard - Lamar Campbell & Spirit Of Praise - 4:37
9. Come Ye Disconsolate - Ted & Sheri - 5:44
10. It's In My Heart - Harvey Watkins Jr. feat. Doug Williams and Melvin Williams - 5:18
11. He's Coming Back - 7 Sons of Soul - 4:49
12. Afterwhile - Keith "Wonderboy" Johnson - 4:04
13. Amazing Grace - Shirley Caesar - 4:13
14. Higher In The Lord - Beverly Crawford - 4:01
15. Right On Time - Lee Williams & The Spiritual QC's - 5:32
16. View The City - RiZen - 4:18

== Certifications ==
Region	Certification	Certified units/sales
United States (RIAA)	Platinum	1,000,000^{^}
^{^} Shipments figures based on certification alone.
