= WOW Gospel 2005 =

Compilation album by Various Artists
- Released: January 25, 2005
- Genre: CCM, Gospel
- Label: Verity Records

Various Artists chronology
WOW Gospel 2004 (2004)	WOW Gospel 2005 (2005)	WOW Gospel 2006 (2006)

Professional ratings
Review scores
Source	Rating
Allmusic	4/5 stars
Black Gospel	(extremely favourable)

WOW Gospel 2005 is a double CD gospel music compilation album in the WOW series. Released on January 25, 2005, it has thirty-one tracks. The album cover pays tribute to Washington, D.C.

It reached 29th place on the Billboard 200 chart in 2005, first place on the Top Gospel Albums chart in both 2005 and 2006, and 13th place on the Top R&B/Hip-Hop Albums chart. In 2006, WOW Gospel 2005 was certified as platinum in the US by the Recording Industry Association of America (RIAA).

== Track listing ==
=== Disc 1 ===
1. Celebrate (He Lives) - Fred Hammond - 4:06
2. God Is Good - Deitrick Haddon - 3:54
3. You Don't Know - Kierra "Kiki" Sheard - 4:11
4. God Will Take Care - Ted & Sheri - 4:36
5. Hallelujah Praise - CeCe Winans - 4:08
6. Healed - Donald Lawrence & Co. - 4:59
7. Because Of Who You Are - Vicki Yohe - 5:15
8. 'Tis So Sweet - Shea Norman - 3:30
9. We Need A Word From The Lord - Vickie Winans - 4:31
10. In Your Name - John P. Kee - 4:22
11. Make Me Over - Tonéx & The Peculiar People - 4:29
12. Take My Life - Micah Stampley - 4:59
13. In The Presence Of A King - Donald Lawrence & The Tri-City Singers - 4:48
14. The Prayer (duet) - Donnie McClurkin featuring Yolanda Adams - 4:33
15. You Cover Me - Donald Lawrence featuring Hezekiah Walker - 5:50
16. Sweet Spirit - 21:03 - 4:12

=== Disc 2 ===
1. Can't Nobody (live) - Smokie Norful - 5:17
2. Again I Say Rejoice - Israel & New Breed - 5:06
3. The Presence Of The Lord Is Here - Byron Cage - 6:38
4. We Acknowledge You - Karen Clark-Sheard - 5:03
5. Suddenly - Bishop Eddie Long presents New Birth Total Praise Choir, feat. Vanessa Bell Armstrong - 4:29
6. Stronger - The Canton Spirituals featuring Paul Porter - 4:39
7. I'm Going To Wait - Shirley Caesar featuring The Caesar Singers & The Greater Grace Temple Community Church Choir - 4:28
8. I Belong To You - The Rance Allen Group - 4:48
9. He Lifted Me - Twinkie Clark - 5:51
10. Let Go And Let God - Keith "Wonderboy" Johnson & The Spiritual Voices - 4:58
11. Let Us All Go Back - Ricky Dillard & New G - 5:30
12. Glorious - Martha Munizzi - 4:09
13. Worship Experience - William Murphy - 5:26
14. Let It Rain - Bishop Paul S. Morton & The Full Gospel Baptist Church Fellowship Mass Choir - 3:54
15. Glory Hallelujah - Darrel Petties & Strength In Praise - 4:00

== Charts ==
=== Weekly charts ===
Chart (2005)	Peak position
US Billboard 200	29
US Top Gospel Albums (Billboard)	1
US Top R&B/Hip-Hop Albums (Billboard)	13

=== Year-end charts ===
Chart (2005)	Position
US Top R&B/Hip-Hop Albums (Billboard)	83

== Certifications ==
Region	Certification	Certified units/sales
United States (RIAA)	Platinum	1,000,000^{^}
^{^} Shipments figures based on certification alone.
