= WOW Gospel 2006 =

Compilation album by Various Artists
- Released: January 31, 2006
- Genre: CCM, Gospel

Various Artists chronology
WOW Gospel 2005 (2005)	WOW Gospel 2006 (2006)	WOW Gospel 2007 (2007)

Professional ratings
Review scores
Source	Rating
Allmusic	3.5/5 stars
Christianity Today	(mixed)

WOW Gospel 2006 is a gospel music compilation album from the WOW series. Released on January 31, 2006, it comprises thirty-two songs on a double disc album. The release reached 20 on the Billboard 200 chart in 2006, the highest peak of any of the WOW Gospel series thus far, and made number one on the Top Gospel Albums chart. The album cover pays tribute to Chicago, Illinois.

In 2006 the album was certified as gold in the US by the Recording Industry Association of America (RIAA).

== Track listing ==
=== Disc 1 ===
1. Glorify Him - Darwin Hobbs - 4:05
2. Do You Know Him? (trendsetters mix) - Marvin Sapp - 3:50
3. No Way - Tye Tribbett & GA - 4:07
4. Let Go (The Godson Concept) - Kierra "Kiki" Sheard - 3:17
5. Set Me Free - Myron Butler & Levi - 4:12
6. Gonna Lift Your Name - Anointed - 3:42
7. God Didn't Give Up - Deitrick Haddon - 4:29
8. Save Me - Mary Mary featuring Baby Dubb - 3:14
9. Purified - CeCe Winans - 4:41
10. I Will Find A Way - Fred Hammond - 4:43
11. God Is Able - Smokie Norful - 4:11
12. I Hear You Say - JoAnn Rosario - 4:48
13. We Must Praise - J Moss - 5:09
14. I Speak Life - Donald Lawrence & Co., featuring Donnie McClurkin - 5:17
15. Without You - Nicole C. Mullen - 4:41
16. The Only One - Antonio Neal - 5:28

=== Disc 2 ===
1. I Call You Faithful - Donnie McClurkin - 4:25
2. Lift Him Up - Hezekiah Walker & LFC - 4:31
3. Great Is The Lord - Dorinda Clark Cole - 3:52
4. Since Jesus Came - Tonéx & The Peculiar People, feat. Kirk Franklin - 4:41
5. Celebrate - Ted & Sheri - 4:56
6. War Cry - Micah Stampley - 4:20
7. God Great God - The Kurt Carr Project - 4:50
8. Authority - Karen Clark-Sheard - 5:13
9. God Is - New Birth Total Praise Choir - 5:21
10. Bread Of Heaven - VIP Mass Choir feat. John P. Kee - 4:37
11. House Of The Lord - The Mighty Clouds Of Joy - 4:45
12. For My Good - LaShun Pace - 4:40
13. Jesus Is Love - Ben Tankard Featuring Shirley Murdock - 5:19
14. A Brighter Day - George Huff - 3:21
15. Fallen In Love - Darlene McCoy - 4:27
16. I Pray - Paul Robbins - 2:54

== Certifications ==
Region	Certification	Certified units/sales
United States (RIAA)	Gold	500,000^{^}
^{^} Shipments figures based on certification alone.
