= WOW Gospel 2010 =

Compilation album by Various Artists
- Released: January 26, 2010
- Genre: CCM, Gospel
- Label: Provident Music Group
- Producer: Various

Various Artists chronology
WOW Gospel 2009 (2009)	WOW Gospel 2010 (2010)	WOW Gospel 2011 (2011)

WOW Gospel 2010 is a gospel music compilation album from the WOW series. It was released on January 26, 2010, and features thirty gospel hits on a double CD set. The album cover pays tribute to Detroit, Michigan. The album held number one position for several weeks on Billboard's Top Gospel Albums chart, and reached number 40 on the Billboard 200 chart in 2010.

WOW Gospel 2010 features five songs which peaked at number one on the Hot Gospel chart: Souled Out, Back II Eden, It Ain't Over, They That Wait and I Trust You.

== Track listing ==
=== Disc 1 ===
1. Souled Out - Hezekiah Walker and The Love Fellowship Choir - 3:53
2. Back II Eden - Donald Lawrence and The Company - 4:03
3. Praise Him In Advance - Marvin Sapp - 5:27
4. Help Me Believe - Kirk Franklin - 5:24
5. Wait On The Lord - Donnie McClurkin featuring Karen Clark-Sheard - 5:29
6. Good News - Vanessa Bell Armstrong - 4:34
7. Faithful To Believe - Byron Cage - 5:58
8. It Ain’t Over - Maurette Brown Clark - 6:51
9. God Is A Healer - Kurt Carr and The Kurt Carr Singers - 5:33
10. Justified - Smokie Norful - 5:10
11. Waging War - CeCe Winans - 5:20
12. Cry Your Last Tear - Bishop Paul Morton - 6:29
13. Bettah - Jonathan Nelson and Purpose - 5:47
14. At The Revival - Mighty Clouds Of Joy - 5:16

=== Disc 2 ===
1. They That Wait - Fred Hammond featuring John P. Kee - 6:17
2. Saved By Grace - Israel Houghton - 4:46
3. Here I Am To Worship - Heather Headley - 4:43
4. I Worship You - Mary Mary - 5:56
5. Chasing After You (The Morning Song) - Tye Tribbett and G.A. - 6:43
6. I Look To You - Whitney Houston - 4:27
7. I Pour My Love - Juanita Bynum - 3:05
8. I Trust You - James Fortune and Fiya - 5:44
9. Free - Darwin Hobbs - 5:12
10. Restored - J Moss - 4:11
11. Ungrateful - Deitrick Haddon - 3:52
12. Renewed - Sheri Jones-Moffett - 4:20
13. Revealed - Myron Butler and Levi - 4:40
14. One - Kierra Sheard - 3:05
15. He'll Make A Way - RiZen - 4:13
16. Enter His Gates - Rev. Timothy Wright and The New York Fellowship Choir - 5:28

== Certifications ==
Region	Certification	Certified units/sales
United States (RIAA)	Gold	500,000^{^}
^{^} Shipments figures based on certification alone.
