= WOW Gospel Number 1s =

WOW Gospel #1s: 30 of the Greatest Gospel Hits Ever!

Compilation album by Various artists
- Released: May 8, 2007
- Genres: Gospel, CCM, urban contemporary gospel
- Label: Verity

Professional ratings
Review scores
Source	Rating
The Phantom Tollbooth	4/5 stars

WOW Gospel #1s included thirty of the number one gospel songs from the past decade on a double CD album. The tracks in this collection have all previously appeared on the annual WOW Gospel compilations. Although not critically well received it still reached number #74 on the Billboard 200 chart in 2007.

== Track listing ==
=== Disc 1 ===
1. Brighter Day - Kirk Franklin - 5:37
2. Shackles (Praise You) - Mary Mary - 3:15
3. No, Never - Kierra "KiKi" Sheard - 3:44
4. Set Me Free - Myron Butler & Levi - 4:12
5. No Way - Tye Tribbett & Greater Anointing (GA) - 4:08
6. Heaven Knows - Deitrick Haddon - 3:27
7. You Know Me - George Huff (singer) - 5:01
8. God Has Not 4Got - Tonéx - 4:36
9. We Must Praise - J Moss - 5:09
10. Hallelujah Praise - CeCe Winans - 4:07
11. Never Seen The Righteous - Donald Lawrence presents The Tri-City Singers - 4:43
12. Let The Praise Begin (live) - Fred Hammond & Radical for Christ - 4:41
13. Glorify Him - Darwin Hobbs - 4:05
14. Shake Yourself Loose - Vickie Winans - 4:46
15. If We Pray - Anointed - 3:59
16. The Battle - Hezekiah Walker and The LFT Church Choir - 4:19

=== Disc 2 ===
1. The Blessing Of Abraham - Donald Lawrence presents The Tri-City Singers - 6:04
2. The Presence Of The Lord - Byron Cage - 6:36
3. Authority - Karen Clark-Sheard - 5:13
4. Stand! - Victory in Praise Music and Arts Seminar Mass Choir - 4:06
5. Helen's Testimony - Helen Baylor - 7:29
6. We Fall Down - Donnie McClurkin - 4:54
7. I Almost Let Go - Kurt Carr & The Kurt Carr Singers - 5:41
8. Healing - Richard Smallwood with Vision - 6:12
9. I Need You Now - Smokie Norful - 4:11
10. The Battle Is The Lord's - Yolanda Adams - 4:25
11. Strong Man - Shirley Caesar - 4:26
12. So Good To Me - Vanessa Bell Armstrong - 4:28
13. You Can't Hurry God - Dorinda Clark Cole - 5:25
14. Strength - The New Life Community Choir featuring John P. Kee - 4:52
