= WOW Gospel 2007 =

Compilation album by Various Artists
- Released: January 30, 2007
- Genres: CCM, Gospel
- Label: Verity Records

Various Artists chronology
WOW Gospel 2006 (2006)	WOW Gospel 2007 (2007)	WOW Gospel 2008 (2008)

Professional ratings
Review scores
Source	Rating
Allmusic	3/5 stars
The Phantom Tollbooth	4/5 stars

WOW Gospel 2007 is a gospel music compilation album from the WOW series. Released January 30, 2007, it showcases thirty-one contemporary Gospel songs on a double CD set. It reached 21 on the Billboard 200 chart in 2007, and made number one on the Top Gospel Albums chart. The album cover pays tribute to Atlanta, Georgia.

In 2007 the album was certified as gold in the US by the Recording Industry Association of America (RIAA). The only gospel hit to reach number one featured here is Blessing of Abraham.

== Track listing ==
=== Disc 1 ===
1. The Blessing Of Abraham - Donald Lawrence presents The Tri-City Singers - 6:04
2. Psalm 68 (Let Our God Arise) - Kurt Carr - 4:59
3. Faithful Is Our God - Hezekiah Walker & The Love Fellowship Choir - 5:01
4. That Place - Myron Butler & Levi - 4:53
5. We Praise You - The McClurkin Project - 4:38
6. You Showed Me - Karen Clark-Sheard - 4:28
7. You Can Change - Tye Tribbett & G.A., featuring Kim Burrell - 5:05
8. Let Go - DeWayne Woods - 4:21
9. Thank Ya Jesus - Darrel Petties & Strength In Praise - 3:57
10. I Made It - Keith "Wonderboy" Johnson & The Spiritual Voices - 5:29
11. All Things Working - LaShun Pace - 4:27
12. Church Medley: We've Come This Far By Faith/I Will Trust In The Lord - Donnie McClurkin - 4:36
13. Order My Steps - The Mighty Clouds Of Joy - 5:15
14. Broken But I'm Healed - Byron Cage - 4:59
15. So Good To Me - Vanessa Bell Armstrong - 4:28

=== Disc 2 ===
1. The Real Party (Trevon's Birthday) - Mary Mary - 3:46
2. Victory - Yolanda Adams - 4:40
3. Your Name - Kenny Lattimore & Chanté Moore - 4:00
4. Turn It Around - Israel & New Breed - 5:20
5. Celebrate - Smokie Norful - 4:02
6. Message For Ya - Nicole C. Mullen featuring Bootsy Collins - 3:15
7. Everybody - Men Of Standard featuring Baby Dubb - 3:34
8. You've Been So Good - Martha Munizzi - 5:38
9. No, Never - Kierra "KiKi" Sheard - 3:45
10. Livin' 4 (remix) - J Moss - 3:59
11. You Know Me - George Huff - 5:02
12. Heaven Knows - Deitrick Haddon - 3:26
13. What Do You Do - Dave Hollister - 3:50
14. Love Makes The World Beautiful - V3 - 4:30
15. Healed Heart - Ramsey Lewis featuring Darius Brooks - 7:45
16. Precious Lord, Take My Hand - Kelly Price - 2:35

== Certifications ==
Region	Certification	Certified units/sales
United States (RIAA)	Gold	500,000^{^}
^{^} Shipments figures based on certification alone.
