= WOW Gospel 2008 =

Compilation album by Various Artists
- Released: February 12, 2008
- Genres: CCM, Gospel
- Label: Verity Records

Various Artists chronology
WOW Gospel 2007 (2007)	WOW Gospel 2008 (2008)	WOW Gospel 2009 (2009)

Professional ratings
Review scores
Source	Rating
Allmusic	3/5 stars
The Phantom Tollbooth	3.5/5 stars

WOW Gospel 2008 is a gospel music compilation album in the WOW series. Released on February 12, 2008, it comprises thirty-three songs on a double CD set. It reached 34 on the Billboard 200 chart in 2008, and number one on the Top Gospel Albums chart. The album cover pays tribute to Dallas, Texas.

The album was certified as gold in the US in 2008 by the Recording Industry Association of America (RIAA). It features three number one gospel hits: Looking For You, Encourage Yourself and Blessed & Highly Favored.

== Track listing ==
=== Disc 1 ===
1. Looking For You - Kirk Franklin - 4:06
2. Stronger - Myron Butler & Levi - 3:38
3. Be Blessed - Karen Clark-Sheard - 3:42
4. I'm Not Perfect - J Moss featuring Anthony Hamilton - 4:09
5. Where Would I Be - Smokie Norful - 4:44
6. All That I Need - Cece Winans - 3:56
7. Complete - LaShun Pace - 3:42
8. Grateful (remix) - Hezekiah Walker & LFC, featuring Dave Hollister - 5:17
9. Hold On - Yolanda Adams - 4:46
10. Yesterday - Mary Mary - 5:19
11. Heaven's Best - Kelly Price - 3:50
12. If I Tell God - Kurt Carr - 4:27
13. Wait - Vanessa Bell Armstrong - 4:55
14. Blessed & Highly Favored - The Clark Sisters - 4:33
15. Encourage Yourself - Donald Lawrence/The Tri-City Singers - 4:31
16. God Is - DeWayne Woods featuring The Tri-City Singers - 3:50
17. Movin' - The Mighty Clouds Of Joy - 4:02
18. Anything - Patti LaBelle featuring Mary Mary - 4:44

=== Disc 2 ===
1. Sanctuary - The New Life Community Choir, featuring John P. Kee - 4:51
2. Magnify - Marvin Sapp - 4:56
3. This Is The Day - Fred Hammond - 4:29
4. Holy Holy Holy - Byron Cage - 5:11
5. With Long Life - Israel & New Breed featuring T-Bone - 3:49
6. You - Kierra "KiKi" Sheard - 2:51
7. Incredible God, Incredible Praise - James Hairston & Youthful Praise - 6:25
8. Sinking - Tye Tribbett & Greater Anointing - 6:27
9. I'll Trust You - Richard Smallwood/Vision - 5:18
10. I Never Lost My Praise - Tramaine Hawkins feat. Patrick Lundy & The Ministers of Music - 6:21
11. I Don't Mind Waiting - Juanita Bynum - 5:48
12. Only You Are Holy - Donnie McClurkin - 6:56
13. One Touch (Press) - Nicole C. Mullen - 4:27
14. Lord Prepare Me To Be A Sanctuary - Bishop Charles E. Blake presents The West Angeles Church of God in Christ Mass Choir - 5:32
15. Grace - Bishop T.D. Jakes & The Potter's House Mass Choir - 4:27

== Certifications ==
Region	Certification	Certified units/sales
United States (RIAA)	Gold	500,000^{^}
^{^} Shipments figures based on certification alone.
