= WOW Gospel 2011 =

Compilation album by Various Artists
- Released: February 1, 2011
- Genre: CCM, Gospel
- Label: Verity Records
- Producer: Various

Various Artists chronology
WOW Gospel 2010 (2010)	WOW Gospel 2011 (2011)	WOW Gospel 2012 (2012)

Professional ratings
Review scores
Source	Rating
Allmusic	3/5 stars
Gospelflava	(favourable)

WOW Gospel 2011 is a gospel music compilation album from the award-winning WOW series. Released on February 1, 2011 (which made it the first annual WOW Gospel album in the history of the series not released in January), the double CD album features thirty contemporary gospel hits. The album cover pays tribute to Philadelphia, Pennsylvania. The album debuted straight at number one on the Billboard Gospel Albums chart, and peaked at number 29 on the Billboard 200 in 2011.

Five songs featured on WOW Gospel 2011 have reached number one on Gospel Songs chart: The Best In Me, I Believe, God In Me, He Wants It All and Nobody Greater.

== Track listing ==
=== Disc One ===
1. Awesome God - Fred Hammond - 4:38
2. Resting On His Promise - Youthful Praise featuring J.J. Hairston - 5:57
3. The Best In Me - Marvin Sapp - 4:17
4. I Believe - James Fortune & FIYA featuring Shawn McLemore & Zacardi Cortez - 5:37
5. God In Me - Mary Mary featuring Kierra "Kiki" Sheard - 3:09
6. Prayed Up - Karen Clark Sheard - 3:51
7. Hide Me - Kirk Franklin - 5:12
8. Rebuild (Remix) - J. Moss - 3:50
9. He Wants It All - Forever Jones - 3:20
10. No One Else - Smokie Norful - 6:07
11. God Favored Me - Hezekiah Walker & The Love Fellowship Choir featuring Marvin Sapp & D. J. Rogers - 5:14
12. There Is A King In You - Donald Lawrence & Company - 4:49
13. Everywhere That I Go - Israel Houghton - 4:24
14. Background - Lecrae featuring C-Lite - 4:40
15. Good - Tye Tribbett - 4:06

=== Disc Two ===
1. Living On The Top - DeWayne Woods - 3:28
2. Joy Of The Lord - Tamela Mann - 4:37
3. Nobody Greater - VaShawn Mitchell - 6:08
4. Speak - Myron Butler & Levi - 5:40
5. Love Like Crazy - Kierra "Kiki" Sheard - 3:46
6. Just Love - Brian Courtney Wilson - 4:15
7. The Great I Am - Donnie McClurkin - 5:33
8. How I Got Over - Vickie Winans featuring Tim Bowman Jr. - 5:29
9. I'll Be Up There - Mighty Clouds Of Joy - 3:30
10. So Good To Me - Lee Williams & The Spiritual QC's - 5:33
11. I Can't Hold It - Byron Cage - 4:35
12. Help - Vanessa Bell Armstrong - 6:27
13. I Give Myself Away - William McDowell - 5:18
14. Jesus Is Love - Heather Headley and Smokie Norful - 5:40
15. Favor - Shirley Caesar - 4:40

== Certifications ==
Region	Certification	Certified units/sales
United States (RIAA)	Gold	500,000^{^}
^{^} Shipments figures based on certification alone.
