= WOW Gospel 2009 =

Compilation album by Various Artists
- Released: January 27, 2009
- Genre: CCM, Gospel

Various Artists chronology
| WOW Gospel 2008 (2008) | WOW Gospel 2009 (2009) | WOW Gospel 2010 (2010) |

Professional ratings
Review scores
| Source | Rating |
|---|---|
| GospelFlava | (Favourable) |

WOW Gospel 2009 is a gospel music compilation album from the WOW series. Released on January 27, 2009, it includes thirty songs and two bonus tracks on a double album. It reached number 27 on the Billboard 200 chart in 2009, and number one on the Billboard Top Gospel Albums chart. The album cover pays tribute to the United States of America, particularly with the 2008 election and 2009 inauguration of U.S. President Barack Obama. (Coincidentally, this album was released exactly one week after the latter.)

WOW Gospel 2009 has the only number one gospel chart hit: "Never Would Have Made It".

== Track listing ==
=== Disc 1 ===
1. Stand Out - Tye Tribbett & Greater Anointing - 4:44
2. Jesus - Kirk Franklin - 3:45
3. Get Up - Mary Mary - 3:10
4. Striving - Dave Hollister - 4:31
5. Praise Him Now - Kierra "KiKi" Sheard - 3:48
6. Power Of Christ (live) - 21:03 - 4:49
7. Even Me - Crystal Aikin - 4:37
8. Jesus Saves - Myron Butler & Levi - 5:14
9. L.O.U.D. L.O.U.D. - Fred Hammond - 5:56
10. Always - Jason Champion - 3:10
11. Go With Me - Deitrick Haddon - 3:21
12. Forever - Cece Winans - 4:28
13. Glory To The King - Anthony Evans - 4:45
14. Abundantly - J Moss - 3:41
15. Run Til I Finish - Smokie Norful - 3:07
16. I Wish - Nicole C. Mullen - 3:09
17. Running Back To You - Heather Headley - 5:30

=== Disc 2 ===
1. Take It Back - Dorinda Clark Cole - 4:45
2. Not About Us - Bishop Noel Jones & The City of Refuge Sanctuary Choir - 4:33
3. I Praise You - Shari Addison - 4:55
4. Giants - Donald Lawrence & The Tri-City Singers - 5:11
5. One God - Maurette Brown Clark - 4:54
6. Royalty - Byron Cage - 5:12
7. It's Over Now - Vanessa Bell Armstrong - 4:06
8. Never Would Have Made It - Marvin Sapp - 5:01
9. He's Done Enough - Beverly Crawford - 6:18
10. God Is Good - Regina Belle - 4:00
11. Jesus, Jesus, Jesus - Rev. Timothy Wright & The New York Fellowship Mass Choir - 6:32
12. Livin' - The Clark Sisters - 4:54
13. The Light - Ricky Dillard & New G - 5:37
14. Jesus - Shekinah Glory Ministry - 5:04
15. Jesus Kind Of Man - The Mighty Clouds Of Joy - 3:48
