= WOW Gospel Essentials 2 =

WOW Gospel Essentials 2: All-Time Favorite Songs

Compilation album by Various artists
- Released: May 26, 2009
- Genre: Gospel, CCM
- Length: 57:00
- Label: Jive / Verity

WOW Gospel Essentials compilation albums chronology
WOW Gospel Essentials (2008)	WOW Gospel Essentials 2: All-Time Favorite Songs (2009)

Professional ratings
Review scores
Source	Rating
AllMusic	3/5 stars

WOW Gospel Essentials 2 is a best of gospel music collection including some of the biggest hits of the modern era. The album has twelve songs on a single CD. It peaked at tenth place on Billboard's Top Gospel Albums chart in 2009, and at 74 on the Top R&B/Hip-Hop Albums chart.

== Track listing ==
No.	Title	Artist (Album)	Length
1.	"Shackles (Praise You)"	Mary Mary (Thankful)	3:13
2.	"Never Seen the Righteous"	The Tri-City Singers (Tri-City 4.com)	4:41
3.	"Why We Sing"	Kirk Franklin (Kirk Franklin and the Family)	5:47
4.	"Total Praise"	Richard Smallwood with Vision (Adoration: Live in Atlanta)	4:58
5.	"We Must Praise"	J. Moss (The J. Moss Project)	4:13
6.	"Blessed & Highly Favored"	The Clark Sisters (Live – One Last Time)	4:31
7.	"The Presence of the Lord Is Here"	Byron Cage (Live at New Birth Cathedral)	6:38
8.	"Let the Praise Begin"	Fred Hammond & Radical for Christ (Pages of Life - Chapters I & II)	4:42
9.	"The Battle Is the Lord's"	Yolanda Adams (Yolanda... Live in Washington)	4:25
10.	"We Fall Down"	Donnie McClurkin (Live in London and More...)	4:54
11.	"I Believe"	Marvin Sapp (I Believe)	6:28
12.	"Show Up!" (featuring John P. Kee)	The New Life Community Choir (Show Up!)	5:10
Total length:			57:00
