= WOW Gospel Christmas =

Compilation album by Various artists
- Released: September 25, 2007
- Genre: CCM, Gospel
- Length: 2:22:33

Professional ratings
Review scores
Source	Rating
Allmusic	3/5 stars

WOW Gospel Christmas includes thirty songs on a double CD album. In 2007 it reached #78 on the Billboard 200 chart, took first place on the Top Gospel Albums chart, and 20th spot on the Top R&B/Hip-Hop Albums chart. In 2008 it reached 24th spot on the Top R&B/Hip-Hop Albums chart.

== Track listing ==
=== Disc 1 ===
1. Do You Hear What I Hear - Cece Winans - 5:15
2. O Holy Night - Smokie Norful - 5:19
3. His Name Is Jesus - Fred Hammond - 4:29
4. Go Tell It On The Mountain - Lashun Pace - 4:23
5. Little Drummer Boy - Darwin Hobbs - 5:01
6. O What A Night - Richard Smallwood/Vision - 5:39
7. God Speaking - Mandisa - 4:54
8. Agnus Dei - Donnie McClurkin - 3:44
9. In The Presence Of A King - The Tri-City Singers - 4:52
10. Mary Did You Know - Vanessa Bell Armstrong - 3:52
11. Joy To The World - Beverly Crawford - 3:45
12. It's Christmas Time - Juanita Bynum & Myron Williams - 5:01
13. O Little Town Of Bethlehem - Yolanda Adams - 4:08
14. Hallelujah Chorus - The McClurkin Project - 4:42
15. Holy, Holy, Holy - Kurt Carr & The Kurt Carr Singers - 6:25

=== Disc 2 ===
1. O Come - Israel & New Breed - 5:09
2. This Christmas - Kierra "KiKi" Sheard & Marcus Cole - 3:31
3. Away In A Manger - Angie Winans, T.D. Jakes - 5:40
4. Glory To The Lamb - Marvin Sapp - 5:44
5. Now Behold The Lamb - Kirk Franklin & The Family - 6:58
6. Lamb - Donald Lawrence - 5:39
7. The First Noel - Aaron Neville - 4:22
8. Lamb Of God - Nicole C. Mullen - 4:18
9. Give Love On Christmas - Myron Butler & Levi - 4:29
10. How Great Is Our God - Dijon - 3:45
11. Sweet Little Jesus Boy - Take 6 - 3:27
12. For Unto Us A Child Is Born - Bebe Winans & Cece Winans - 4:29
13. What Child Is This - Shirley Caesar - 4:01
14. No Christmas Without You - John P. Kee and New Life - 4:02
15. Born To Die - Hezekiah Walker & LFC - 5:32
