= WOW Gospel 2012 =

Compilation album by various artists
- Released: January 24, 2012
- Genre: Contemporary Christian music, Gospel
- Length: 2:17:49
- Label: Verity Records
- Producer: Various

Various artists chronology
WOW Gospel 2011 (2011)	WOW Gospel 2012 (2012)	WOW Gospel 2013 (2013)

Professional ratings
Review scores
Source	Rating
Allmusic	3.5/5 stars

WOW Gospel 2012 is a gospel music compilation album from the award-winning WOW series. Released on January 24, 2012, the double CD album features thirty contemporary gospel hits. The album cover pays tribute to Los Angeles, California, with a side tribute to the San Francisco Bay Area on the back album cover notes. The album peaked at number one on the Billboard Gospel Albums Chart, and number 30 on the Billboard 200 chart.

Three songs from the album went to number one on the Billboard Gospel songs chart: In the Middle, I Need Your Glory and Let the Church Say Amen.

== Track listing ==
=== Disc One ===
1. Before I Die - Kirk Franklin - 4:22
2. Walking - Mary Mary - 3:21
3. In the Middle - Isaac Carree - 3:48
4. He Has His Hands On You - Marvin Sapp - 5:53
5. Well Done - Deitrick Haddon - 5:30
6. Put It On the Altar - Jessica Reedy - 4:06
7. Back to You - Dorinda Clark Cole - 3:06
8. Sweeter - Kim Burrell - 3:31
9. Incredible - 21:03 - 4:24
10. Love God, Love People - Israel Houghton - 4:43
11. Boasting - Lecrae - 3:49
12. He Lives (2011) - Fred Hammond - 4:28
13. Encore - James Fortune & FIYA - 4:46
14. Believe - Jennifer Hudson - 4:59

=== Disc Two ===
1. God Is Great - Ricky Dillard and New G - 4:59
2. You Are - Kierra "Kiki" Sheard - 3:52
3. YRM (Your Righteous Mind) - Donald Lawrence & Company featuring Dorinda Clark Cole - 4:46
4. Chasing After You - VaShawn Mitchell - 4:25
5. I Need Your Glory - Earnest Pugh - 4:59
6. Bless the Lord - Myron Butler - 4:46
7. Trust Me - Richard Smallwood with Vision - 4:22
8. I Choose to Worship - Wess Morgan - 5:40
9. The Blood Will Never Lose Its Power - Smokie Norful - 3:32
10. Speechless - Anita Wilson - 4:47
11. Blessings - John P. Kee featuring Rance Allen - 4:11
12. Excellent - Martha Munizzi - 5:51
13. It's All God - The Soul Seekers featuring Marvin Winans - 5:59
14. Make Me New - Together We Stand Community Choir featuring Mali Music - 5:01
15. Let the Church Say Amen - Andrae Crouch - 4:57
16. Heaven - Forever Jones - 5:04
