= WOW series =

Compilation albums featuring contemporary Christian music

"WOW" is a series of annual compilation albums featuring contemporary Christian music dating from 1995. Comprising songs submitted by each partner label, the annual WOW Hits releases are usually double CD sets. The series was officially cancelled in 2019. Throughout its run, the WOW franchise evolved into one of the most successful collections of Christian music.

== Background ==
The birth of the WOW record project can be traced to Grant Cunningham, A&R Director at Sparrow Records. In November 1994, Cunningham made a business trip to EMI Limited in London, which at the time was the parent company of Sparrow Records. There, he noticed that several British record labels were issuing an annual CD of top-rated songs, known as the NOW series, containing collections of pop songs. Cunningham brought the idea back to Sparrow. Sparrow executives suggested a similar project be developed for Christian pop music and he was assigned the task of getting the project off the ground.

Released in late 1995, WOW 1996 was the first in the WOW Series and the first recording put together by the three major Christian record companies of the time: Word Records (now Word Entertainment), Sparrow Records (formerly part of EMI Christian Music Group), and Reunion Records (now part of Sony's Provident Label Group). Still today, after each submitting label agrees to a reduced master royalty, the final decision on the tracks to be included is made by committee. Production, marketing, and distribution for the "WOW Hits" series was handled by EMI Christian Music Group, and from 2013, by Capitol Christian Music Group, which is now a Universal Music Group company.

In 1999, the annual WOW Worship series was launched. Rather than using the year, each release is identified by the color of the cover. The worship series and hits series are today among the best-selling members of the product brand. Beginning in 2008, WOW began releasing separate single-disc collections spread throughout each year, rather than a two-disc collection toward the end of each year. In addition to WOW Hits, which focuses on the most popular pop and pop-rock music, plans call for either single-disc WOW Rock Hits and WOW Pop Hits collections released twice a year.

== Released annually ==
=== WOW Series ===
WOW Series was the first and most successful series of WOW collections, and contains the following albums:

Title	Details	Peak chart positions		Certifications
Title	Details	US	US Christ	Certifications
WOW 1996	Release date: November 7, 1995; Label: Sparrow, EMI; Formats: CD, Cassette tape, Music download	144	7	US: Platinum
WOW 1997	Release date: October 29, 1996; Label: Sparrow, EMI; Formats: CD, Cassette tape, Music download	71	1	US: Platinum
WOW 1998	Release date: November 4, 1997; Label: EMI; Formats: CD, Cassette tape, Music download	52	2	US: Platinum; CAN: Gold
WOW 1999	Release date: October 20, 1998; Label: EMI; Formats: CD, Cassette tape, Music download	51	2	US: 2× Platinum; CAN: Gold
WOW 2000	Release date: October 26, 1999; Label: Sparrow, EMI; Formats: CD, Cassette tape, Music download	29	1	US: 2× Platinum; CAN: Gold

=== Wow Hits ===
In 2000, the WOW Series was rebranded to WOW Hits, forming the second and also the most successful series of WOW collections. In 2008, the WOW Series contemplated releasing three single discs per year instead of the annual double discs customers were used to. Only one single disc was ever released, WOW Hits 1. in the spring of 2008, before reverting to the annual format. It is not known why the publishers decided to return to the annual format instead of the new format, which was inspired by the Now That's What I Call Music! series, which releases three discs annually. It contains the following albums:

Title	Details	Peak chart positions		Certifications	Sales
Title	Details	US	US Christ	Certifications	Sales
WOW Hits 2001	Release date: October 24, 2000; Label: Sparrow, EMI; Formats: CD, Cassette tape, Music download	36	1	US: 2× Platinum	
WOW Hits 2002	Release date: October 23, 2001; Label: Sparrow; Formats: CD, digital download	52	2	US: Platinum	
WOW Hits 2003	Release date: October 1, 2002; Label: Chordant; Formats: CD, digital download	34	1	US: Platinum	
WOW Hits 2004	Release date: October 7, 2003; Label: EMI; Formats: CD, digital download	51	1	US: Platinum	
WOW Hits 2005	Release date: October 5, 2004; Label: EMI; Formats: CD, digital download	39	1	US: Platinum; CAN: Gold	
WOW Hits 2006	Release date: October 4, 2005; Label: Chordant; Formats: CD, digital download	42	1	US: Platinum	
WOW Hits 2007	Release date: October 3, 2006; Label: EMI; Formats: CD, digital download	38	1	US: Platinum	
WOW Hits 2008	Release date: October 2, 2007; Label: EMI; Formats: CD, digital download	56	2	US: Gold	
WOW Hits 1	Release date: April 8, 2008; Label: EMI; Formats: CD, Digital Download	99	4		
WOW Hits 2009	Release date: October 7, 2008; Label: Word; Formats: CD, Digital Download	31	1	US: Platinum	
WOW Hits 2010	Release date: October 6, 2009; Label: Word; Formats: CD, Digital Download	33	1	US: Platinum	US: 338,000
WOW Hits 2011	Release date: October 5, 2010; Label: Word; Formats: CD, Digital Download	26	1	US: Gold	
WOW Hits 2012	Release date: September 27, 2011; Label: Provident; Formats: CD, Digital Download	35	1	US: Gold	US: 284,000
WOW Hits 2013	Release date: September 25, 2012; Label: EMI; Formats: CD, Digital Download	39	1	US: Gold	US: 282,000
WOW Hits 2014	Release date: September 24, 2013; Label: Capitol CMG; Formats: CD, Digital Download	29	1	US: Gold	US: 162,000
WOW Hits 2015	Release date: September 30, 2014; Label: Capitol CMG; Formats: CD, Digital Download	23	1	US: Gold	US: 155,000
WOW Hits 2016	Release date: September 25, 2015; Label: Capitol CMG; Formats: Digital download, CD	55	1		US: 140,000
WOW Hits 2017	Release date: September 23, 2016; Label: Capitol CMG; Formats: Digital download, CD	64	1		
WOW Hits 2018	Release date: October 6, 2017; Label: Capitol CMG; Formats: Digital download, CD	113	3		
WOW Hits 2019	Release Date: October 5, 2018; Label: Capitol CMG; Formats: Digital download, CD	—	5		

=== WOW Gospel ===
WOW Gospel are released annually, beginning with WOW Gospel 1998. The focus of this series is gospel, and the compilation has been issued every year since 1998. Since the release of WOW Gospel 2003, a major metropolitan city that has been influential in the field of gospel music has been honored on the album cover. For instance, New York, NY was honored due in part to the September 11, 2001 tragedy, and so on. The exception is WOW Gospel 2009 in which the United States of America was honored due to the previous year's election. Another exception was when Atlanta was honored twice - first in 2007 and 2013. However, for Wow Gospel 2014 and Wow Gospel 2015, they did not recognize a city, however used a different background for the cover. The series consists of the following albums:

- WOW Gospel 1998
- WOW Gospel 1999
- WOW Gospel 2000
- WOW Gospel 2001
- WOW Gospel 2002
- WOW Gospel 2003
- WOW Gospel 2004
- WOW Gospel 2005
- WOW Gospel 2006
- WOW Gospel 2007
- WOW Gospel 2008
- WOW Gospel 2009
- WOW Gospel 2010
- WOW Gospel 2011
- WOW Gospel 2012
- WOW Gospel 2013
- WOW Gospel 2014
- WOW Gospel 2015
- WOW Gospel 2016
- WOW Gospel 2017
- WOW Gospel 2018
- WOW Gospel 2019

=== WOW Worship ===
The WOW Worship series was released annually beginning with WOW Worship Blue in 1999. The focus on this series is praise and worship. The first album features songs performed by the worship leaders who wrote them, including Darlene Zschech's "Shout to the Lord". It is a partnership between Integrity Music, Maranatha Music and Vineyard Music. After several years, it switched to a contemporary Christian music format, where CCM recording artists perform praise and worship songs in their style. The series features ten albums.

Title	Details	Peak chart positions			Certifications
Title	Details	US	US Christ	US Gospel	Certifications
WOW Worship: Blue	Release date: June 15, 1999; Formats: CD & Cassette; Label: Word (Christian Market) & Word/Epic (General Market)	144	1	—	US: 2× Platinum; CAN: Platinum
WOW Worship: Orange	Release date: March 28, 2000; Formats: CD & Cassette; Label: Word (Christian Market) & Word/Epic (General Market)	65	1	—	US: Platinum; CAN: Gold
WOW Worship: Green	Release date: March 20, 2001; Formats: CD & Cassette; Label: Word (Christian Market) & Word/Epic (General Market)	78	3	—	US: Gold; CAN: Gold
WOW Worship: The Platinum Collection	Release date: 2002; Formats: CD (6-discs); Label: Word	—	—	—	
WOW Worship: Yellow	Release date: March 18, 2003; Formats: CD; Label: Provident		1	—	US: Platinum
WOW Worship: Red	Release date: March 9, 2004; Formats: CD; Label: Word	62	2	—	
WOW Worship: Aqua	Release date: April 4, 2006; Formats: CD; Label: Provident	75	2	—	US: Gold
WOW Worship: Purple	Release date: March 2, 2010; Formats: CD; Label: Word	93	3	—	US: Gold
WOW Gospel Worship	Release date: August 23, 2011; Formats: CD; Label: Capital CMG	—	—	16	
WOW Worship: Lime	Release date: March 11, 2014; Formats: CD, Digital Download; Versions: Regular and Deluxe Editions; Label: Provident	76	4	—	

=== WOW Essentials ===
WOW Essentials was first released in August 2008. It contains twelve songs that are "essential to Christian music life." The first album features songs from Chris Tomlin, Casting Crowns, and many others. The focus of this series was to showcase favorite and well-known songs picked from the most recent years, and consists of the following albums:

Title	Details	Peak chart positions
Title	Details	US Christ
WOW Essentials	Release date: August 5, 2008; Label: EMI; Formats: CD	13
WOW Essentials 2	Release date: March 17, 2009; Label: Reunion, Integrity; Formats: CD	24

== Released occasionally ==
=== WOW Christmas ===
WOW Christmas is a series of compilation albums featuring Christmas music as recorded by contemporary Christian music artists. The series is released sporadically, beginning in 2002, and consists of the following albums:

Title	Details	Peak chart positions			Certifications	Sales
Title	Details	US	US Christ	US Holiday	Certifications	Sales
WOW Christmas: Red	Release date: October 1, 2002; Label: Word; Formats: CD	45	1	3	US: Platinum	
WOW Christmas: Green	Release date: October 4, 2005; Label: Word; Formats: CD	54	2		US: Gold	
WOW Christmas: White	Release date: September 27, 2011; Label: Word; Formats: CD	61	2	3		US: 127,000
WOW Christmas: Blue	Release date: September 24, 2013; Label: Word; Formats: CD	49	2	3		
WOW Christmas: Gold	Release date: October 13, 2017; Label: Word; Formats: CD	—	12			

== Released once ==
=== WOW #1s ===
Title	Details	Peak chart positions		Certifications
Title	Details	US	US Christ	Certifications
WOW #1s	Release date: April 5, 2005; Label: Provident; Formats: CD, Digital Download	58	1	US: Gold
WOW #1s: Yellow	Release date: March 1, 2011; Label: Word; Formats: CD, Digital Download	—	9	

=== Other albums ===
- WOW The 90s - Released in 1999. All of the songs in this collection were contemporary Christian music hits during the 1990s. Marketing and distribution responsibilities for this title was delegated to Word Entertainment.
- WOW Gold - Released in 2000. It was a single 2-CD/2-cassette collection of contemporary Christian music from the 1960s to the time it was released. Marketing and distribution for this title was given to Brentwood Records (now Provident Music Group).
- WOW for the Children, a single disc released in the year 2000. It includes twelve songs on a single CD. The tracks are a mix of top gospel, CCM and CWM songs. It was compiled especially for the charitable organization Feed the Children. The album was not available commercially but was only given as a gift to donors.
- WOW Gospel Christmas (2007)
- WOW Gospel Christmas - Single Disc Edition (2013)
- WOW Gospel No. 1s (2007)
- WOW Gospel Smooth Jazz Tribute (2007)
- WOW Gospel Essentials (2008)
- WOW Gospel Essentials 2 (2009)
- WOW Gospel Worship
- WOW Gospel the 90s
- WOW Gospel the 2000s
- WOW Hymns was released in March 2007. It is a two-disc compilation album of thirty modern and classic hymns that were recorded by popular Christian musicians. The album features songs by Jeremy Camp, Chris Tomlin, Nichole Nordeman, David Crowder Band, and many other well-known groups and singers. An accompanying songbook was also released by Word Music.
- WOW Next 2007 was a free ten-song CD given to anyone who bought any WOW compilation CD.
- WOW New & Next (2010)
- WOW New & Next 2011 (2011) - WOW New & Next (2010) and WOW New & Next (2011) were 12-song CDs showcasing new artists that was sold, or given free to anyone who bought any WOW compilation CD.
- WOW Hits Party Mix - Released: March 10, 2015. This album features 30 (36 in the Deluxe Edition) remixed versions of some of the top Christian songs included in previous WOW albums.
- WOW Hits 20th Anniversary - Street date: March 18, 2016. This special anniversary album features 30 of the top Christian songs included in previous WOW albums.

== Home video ==
From 1997 to 2012, excluding 2008, the WOW Hits series was accompanied with home video releases. The first of these, WOW 1997 the VIDEO, was a videocassette with nine music videos released in 1996. The sequel, WOW 1998, featured 16 videos. The WOW Gospel series also received home video releases. The final videocassette release was WOW Hits 2004, released in 2003.

Beginning in 2002 with the release of WOW Hits 2003, home videos were released in the DVD format. Prior releases were also reissued on DVD in 2002, with a few modifications. For instance, the 2000 and 2001 releases each had a Raze music video on videocassette, due to a sexual abuse scandal involving Raze frontman Ja'Marc Davis, these were omitted from the DVD releases. Additionally, the 1997 and 1998 releases were released on one DVD.

The final WOW Hits home video release was WOW Hits 2012 in 2011. The final WOW Gospel home video release was WOW Gospel 2017 in 2017.

Spin-off DVDs include WOW British Gospel in 2004 and WOW Music Trivia Game in 2007.
