= WOW Gospel Essentials =

WOW Gospel Essentials: All-Time Favorite Songs

Compilation album by Various artists
- Released: September 16, 2008
- Genre: Gospel, CCM
- Length: 66:00
- Label: EMI Christian Music Group / Verity

WOW Gospel Essentials compilation albums chronology
| WOW Gospel Essentials: All-Time Favorite Songs (2008) | WOW Gospel Essentials 2 (2009) |

Professional ratings
Review scores
| Source | Rating |
|---|---|
| AllMusic | 3/5 stars |

WOW Gospel Essentials is a "best of" Gospel music collection spanning more than ten years. The album includes twelve tracks on one CD. It reached 124 on the Billboard 200 chart in 2008, third place on the Top Gospel Albums chart and twenty-second place on the Top R&B/Hip-Hop Albums chart.

== Track listing ==
| No. | Title | Artist (Album) | Length |
|---|---|---|---|
| 1. | "Stomp" | Kirk Franklin (God's Property from Kirk Franklin's Nu Nation) | 5:37 |
| 2. | "Heaven" | Mary Mary (Mary Mary) | 3:45 |
| 3. | "Open My Heart" | Yolanda Adams (Mountain High... Valley Low) | 5:37 |
| 4. | "No Weapon" | Fred Hammond (The Essential Fred Hammond) | 5:09 |
| 5. | "I Need You Now" (Live) | Smokie Norful (I Need You Now) | 6:29 |
| 6. | "Praise Is What I Do" | Shekinah Glory Ministry (Praise Is What I Do) | 6:39 |
| 7. | "In the Sanctuary" | Kurt Carr Singers (Awesome Wonder) | 6:10 |
| 8. | "I Need You to Survive" | Hezekiah Walker (Family Affair, Vol. 2: Live at Radio City Music Hall) | 7:32 |
| 9. | "Alabaster Box" | CeCe Winans (Alabaster Box) | 5:35 |
| 10. | "Stand" | Donnie McClurkin (Donnie McClurkin) | 5:21 |
| 11. | "You Brought the Sunshine" | The Clark Sisters (You Brought the Sunshine) | 4:17 |
| 12. | "Encourage Yourself" | Donald Lawrence & The Tri-City Singers (Best Of (Live)) | 5:49 |
| Total length: | | | 66:00 |
