= Life Changing =

Studio album by Smokie Norful
- Released: October 3, 2006
- Genre: CCM, gospel
- Length: 43:54
- Label: EMI Gospel

Smokie Norful chronology
Nothing Without You (2004)	Life Changing (2006)	Smokie Norful Live (2009)

Professional ratings
Review scores
Source	Rating
AllMusic	4.5/5 stars

Life Changing is the third studio album by the contemporary gospel singer Smokie Norful. The album was released on October 3, 2006, through EMI Gospel.

== Track listing ==
1. "Celebrate" (Norful, Tyson) - 4:04
2. "Um Good" (Bady) - 4:46
3. "Great & Mighty" (Bady) - 4:15
4. "Run Til I Finish" (Norful) - 3:07
5. "In Time" (Norful, Tyson) - 4:14
6. "More Than Anything" (Myron Butler, Norful) - 4:22
7. "Where Would I Be?" (Norful) - 4:44
8. "Put Your Hands Together" (Bell, Norful) - 3:46
9. "Right Now" (White, Woods) - 4:57
10. "Run to You" (Friedman, Rich) - 4:39
11. "Celebrate (Reprise)"" (Norful, Tyson) - 1:00

== Awards ==
At the 38th GMA Dove Awards, the album was nominated for a Dove Award for Contemporary Gospel Album of the Year.

== Chart performances ==
In the USA, the album peaked at #56 on Billboard 200, #7 on Billboard's R&B/Hip-Hop Albums, #5 on Billboard's Christian Albums, and #2 on Billboard's Gospel Albums. It stayed for 68 weeks on the Gospel Albums charts and 30 weeks on the R&B/Hip-Hop charts. The songs "Celebrate" and "Um Good" peaked at #23 and #2 on Billboard's Gospel Songs chart.
