= 7 Sons of Soul =

American gospel music group

- Origin: Washington, D.C.
- Genres: gospel, urban contemporary gospel, traditional black gospel
- Years active: 2004–present
- Labels: Verity, Zomba, Soul World
- Members: Deonte Gray Cliff Jones Dave "DaveyBoy" Lindsey Paul "Buggy" Edwards Nathaniel Fields Sam Kendrick
- Website: 7sonsofsoul.com

7 Sons of Soul is an American gospel music group from Washington, D.C., who are currently signed to Soul World Entertainment. The group consist of six members, and the three singers who formed the foundation are Deonte Gray, Cliff Jones, and Dave "DaveyBoy" Lindsey, and they added the other three instrumentalist to the group in Paul "Buggy" Edwards, Nathaniel Fields, and Sam Kendrick. The first album, 7 Sons of Soul, was released in 2004 by Verity Records. This was the only record released with the label. The album was their breakthrough release on the Billboard magazine charts, by placing on the Gospel Albums charts. Their second album, Witness, released in 2007 by Zomba Records. This album also charted on the Billboard magazine Gospel Albums chart.

== Background ==
The Washington, D.C.–based group, 7 Sons of Soul was formed in 2004 by Deonte Gray and Cliff Jones, and they did this by adding singer Dave "DaveyBoy" Lindsey, and three other instrumentalist to the group, Paul "Buggy" Edwards on drums, Nathaniel Fields on bass guitar, and Sam Kendrick on keys.

== History ==
The group released their first album, 7 Sons of Soul, on March 23, 2004, by Verity Records. This would be their breakthrough released on the Billboard magazine Gospel Albums chart at No. 24. Paul Poulton, indicating in a nine out of ten review by Cross Rhythms magazine, responds, "The quartet is modern, but not enough to alienate traditional gospel lovers." Their second album, Witness, came out on April 17, 2007, by Zomba Records. This would chart on the same chart, but this time at No. 43. Paul Poulton, mentioning in a ten out of ten review at Cross Rhythms, recognizes, "The Sons have hit the mark fairly and squarely in the centre, with this their second CD."

== Members ==
- Deonte Gray – vocals
- Cliff Jones – vocals
- Dave "DaveyBoy" Lindsey – vocals
- Paul "Buggy" Edwards – drums
- Nathaniel Fields – bass
- Sam Kendrick – keys

== Discography ==
=== Studio albums ===
List of studio albums, with selected chart positions
Title	Album details	Peak chart positions
Title	Album details	US Gos
7 Sons of Soul	Released: March 23, 2004; Label: Verity; CD, digital download	24
Witness	Released: April 17, 2007; Label: Zomba; CD, digital download	43
