= Nothing Without You (Smokie Norful album) =

Studio album by Smokie Norful
- Released: October 5, 2004
- Genre: CCM, Gospel
- Length: 49:14
- Label: EMI Gospel

Smokie Norful chronology
I Need You Now (2002)	Nothing Without You (2004)	Life Changing (2006)

Professional ratings
Review scores
Source	Rating
AllMusic	3.5/5 stars

Nothing Without You is the second studio album from Contemporary Gospel singer Smokie Norful. The album was released on October 5, 2004 through EMI Gospel. In 2005, a Special Edition which included a DVD was released.

== Track listing ==
All songs written by Smokie Norful, except where noted.

1. "Power" (Cedric Caldwell, Victor Caldwell, Norful) - 3:55
2. "Power" (Reprise) feat. Darrell Petties - 1:09
3. "Worthy" (Percy Bady, Norful) - 4:50
4. "God Is Able" - 4:12
5. "I Understand" (Bady) - 4:06
6. "I Know the Lord Will Make a Way" (Public Domain) - 5:46
7. "In the Middle" - 4:09
8. "Can't Nobody" (Josiah Bell, Norful) - 3:24
9. "Nothing Without You" - 3:55
10. "Continuous Grace" - 3:19
11. "I Know Too Much About Him" (Antonio Dixon, Norful) - 5:53
12. "Healing in His Tears" (Myron Butler, Norful) - 4:36

== Awards ==
At the 36th GMA Dove Awards, the song "In the Middle" was nominated to a Dove Award for Contemporary Gospel Recorded Song of the Year.

== Chart performance ==
The album peaked at #57 on Billboard 200, #15 on Billboard's R&B/Hip-Hop Albums, #4 on Billboard's Christian Albums, and #1 on Billboard's Gospel Albums. It stayed 103 weeks on the Gospel Albums charts, 72 weeks on the Christian Albums chart, and 63 weeks on the R&B/Hip-Hop charts. Also, the songs "God Is Able" peaked at #11 on Billboard's Gospel Songs.
