= WOW The 90s =

WoW The 90s: 30 Top Christian Songs of the Decade

Compilation album by Various artists
- Released: July 20, 1999
- Genre: CCM
- Label: Provident Label Group
- Producer: Various

Professional ratings
Review scores
Source	Rating
AllMusic	4.5/5 stars

WOW The 90s is part of the WOW series.

All of the songs in this collection were contemporary Christian music hits during the decade of the 1990s. An album titled: WOW Classics was planned for release in May 1998. It had been intended to include the 30 biggest hits in Christian music from 1990-1995, but was never issued. Marketing and distribution responsibilities for this title in the WOW Hits series were relegated to Word Entertainment. In 1999 WOW The 90s reached #84 on the Billboard 200 chart, and #2 on the Top Contemporary Christian album chart.

== Track listing ==
=== Disc one ===
1. Keep the Candle Burning - Point of Grace
2. Awesome God - Rich Mullins
3. People Get Ready - Crystal Lewis
4. The Great Adventure - Steven Curtis Chapman
5. That's What Love is For - Amy Grant
6. Place in This World - Michael W. Smith
7. On My Knees - Jaci Velasquez
8. My Will - Dc Talk
9. God is In Control - Twila Paris
10. Another Time, Another Place - Sandi Patty, Wayne Watson
11. Basics of Life - 4Him
12. In Christ Alone - Michael English
13. Deep Enough to Dream - Chris Rice
14. Adonai - Avalon
15. Serve the Lord - Carman

=== Disc two ===
1. Under the Influence - Anointed
2. Shine - Newsboys
3. Jesus Freak - Dc Talk
4. God So Loved - Jaci Velasquez
5. I Surrender All - Clay Crosse
6. I Will Be Here - Steven Curtis Chapman
7. Sometimes By Step - Rich Mullins
8. The Great Divide - Point of Grace
9. When God's People Pray - Wayne Watson
10. I Will Be Here for You - Michael W. Smith
11. Where There is Faith - 4Him
12. Everything Changes - Kathy Troccoli
13. Liquid - Jars of Clay
14. Lover of My Soul - Amy Grant
15. Crucified with Christ - Phillips, Craig & Dean
- "Under the Influence" by Anointed is the Acoustic Mix version on this compilation, while WOW 1997 includes the Main Mix version.

== See also ==
- The WOW series
