= Harvey Watkins Jr. =

- Born: Harvey Lee Watkins Jr. November 2, 1954 (age 71); Canton, Mississippi
- Genres: Gospel, urban contemporary gospel, traditional black gospel
- Occupations: Singer, songwriter
- Instruments: Vocals, singer-songwriter, guitar, bass
- Years active: 1973–present
- Labels: J&B, Verity, Malaco
- Member of: The Canton Spirituals

Harvey Lee Watkins Jr. (born November 2, 1954) is an American gospel musician and currently the lead singer of The Canton Spirituals, which his father Harvey Watkins Sr. founded. He started his solo music career, in 1990, with the release of, He's There All the Time, that was released by J&B Records. His second album, It's in My Heart – Live in Raymond, MS, released by Verity Records in 2003, and this placed on the Billboard magazine Gospel Albums chart. The third album, Keep Knocking, was released in 2013 by Malaco Records, but this did not place on any charts.

== Early life ==
Watkins was born on November 2, 1954, as Harvey Lee Watkins Jr. in Canton, Mississippi, He was named after his father Mr. Harvey Lee Watkins Sr. and to Mrs. Emma Watkins. Harvey was their first son and fourth child. He was stricken with Polio, as a three-year-old, and was healed by prayer. He was influenced by his fathers band, The Canton Spirituals which included his uncle, the late Reverend I. S. Watkins. Ever since he was a child he loved their singing and he later became a member in 1973. He is still currently the lead singer for the group and he still continues to tour.

== Music career ==
His solo music recording career commenced in 1990, with the release of He's There All the Time by J&B Records on October 17, 1990. The subsequent album, It's in My Heart – Live in Raymond, MS, was released on June 17, 2003 by Verity Records, and this was his Billboard magazine breakthrough album upon the Gospel Albums chart at No. 11.

== Discography ==
List of studio albums, with selected chart positions
| Title | Album details | Peak chart positions |
| Title | Album details | US Gos |
|---|---|---|
| He's There All the Time | Released: October 17, 1990; Label: J&B; CD, digital download | |
| It's in My Heart – Live in Raymond, MS | Released: June 17, 2003; Label: Verity; CD, digital download | 11 |
