= Wess Morgan =

American gospel musician and pastor (born 1973)

- Also known as: Pastor Wess Morgan
- Born: Joel Wesley Morgan; September 5, 1973 (age 53); Pascagoula, Mississippi
- Origin: Nashville, Tennessee
- Genres: CCM, gospel, southern gospel, urban contemporary gospel
- Occupations: Singer, songwriter
- Instruments: Vocals, singer-songwriter
- Years active: 2006–present
- Labels: Oak Tree, Bowtie World, Flipside
- Website: wessmorgan.com

Joel Wesley Morgan (born September 5, 1973), known professionally as Wess Morgan, is an American gospel musician and pastor. He started his music career, in 2006, with the release of Look at Me Now by Oak Tree Records. His second album, Under an Open Heaven, Vol. 1, was released in 2010 by Bowtie World Music alongside Flipside Music, and this album was his Billboard magazine breakthrough release on the Gospel Albums chart. The song, "I Choose to Worship", was put on the WOW Gospel 2012 album. The subsequent album, Under an Open Heaven, Vol. 2, was released by Bowtie World Music in 2012, and it charted on the aforementioned chart. He released, Livin', in 2014 by Bowtie Music, and it charted on the aforementioned chart. Wess Morgan was a cast member on Tyler Perry's stage play Laugh to Keep from Crying

== Early life ==
Morgan was born in Moss Point, Mississippi, on September 5, 1973, as Joel Wesley Morgan, whose father is Joseph and mother Yolanda, and he has an older brother, Joseph, and a younger sister, and they were raised in Nashville, Tennessee.

== Career ==
His music career commenced in 2006, with the album, Look at Me Now, that was released by Oak Tree Records. The subsequent album, Under an Open Heaven, Vol. 1, was released on October 19, 2010 by Bowtie World Music alongside Flipside Music, and this album was his Billboard magazine breakthrough release on the Gospel Albums chart at No. 10. This album had the single, I Choose to Worship, that charted at No. 4 on the Hot Gospel Songs chart, and was placed on the compilation album, WOW Gospel 2012. He released, Under an Open Heaven, Vol. 2, on December 11, 2012, and this charted on the aforementioned chart at No. 31. His fourth album, Livin', was released in 2014 by Bowtie Music, and this placed at No. 6 on the Gospel Albums chart.

== Personal life ==
Morgan was married for eighteen years to Betsy, they lived in Nashville, Tennessee, that ended in divorce in the middle of 2013. He married Danielle Walker in January 2014, she gave birth to their child later that year.

== Discography ==
List of studio albums, with selected chart positions
Title	Album details	Peak chart positions
Title	Album details	US Gos
Look at Me Now	Released: 2006; Label: Oak Tree; CD, digital download	–
Under an Open Heaven, Vol. 1	Released: October 19, 2010; Label: Bowtie/Flipside; CD, digital download	10
Under an Open Heaven, Vol. 2	Released: December 11, 2012; Label: Bowtie; CD, digital download	31
Livin'	Released: 2014; Label: Bowtie; CD, digital download	6
