= Revealed – Live in Dallas =

Revealed – Live in Dallas is a music album by Myron Butler & Levi, released on March 30, 2010.

== Track listing ==
#	Title	Time
1	Revealed	5:12
2	I Just Can't Live (Feat. Kirk Franklin)	4:38
3	Speak	5:43
4	Holy God	5:29
5	I Choose To Believe	3:44
6	Greatest Love	5:23
7	I Am God	4:05
8	The Journey To The Cross	1:27
9	Run To The Cross (Feat. Smokie Norful)	5:55
10	Moving Closer	5:18
11	Time After Time	5:27
12	Covered	5:43

== Recording information ==
Personnel

- Chris McQueen, Mark Lettieri (guitar)
- Omar Edwards (organ, keyboards)
- Jamar Jones, Shaun Martin (keyboards)
- Robert Searight Jr. (drums)
- Nathan Werth (percussion)
