= Stronger (Myron Butler & Levi album) =

Live album by Myron Butler & Levi
- Released: August 28, 2007
- Genre: Gospel, Soul
- Label: EMI Gospel

Myron Butler & Levi chronology
Set Me Free (2005)	Stronger (2007)

Stronger is the second album from Myron Butler & Levi, released on August 28, 2007.

== Track listing ==
#	Title	Time
1	Stronger	3:36
2	I Live	4:42
3	More Than You'll Ever Know	5:18
4	Jesus Saves	5:14
5	Unrestrained	5:33
6	I Need More Of You	5:01
7	Here With Me	4:22
8	God Of All	4:37
9	Above All	4:45
10	Give Us This Day	3:33
