= Transparent in Your Presence =

Live album by Byron Cage & Purpose
- Released: July 16, 1996
- Recorded: 1996
- Genre: Gospel, Worship & Praise
- Length: 74:40
- Label: Atlanta International Records Gospel
- Producer: Steve Bracey; Byron Cage; James Brown

Byron Cage & Purpose chronology
Dwell Among Us (1995)	Transparent in Your Presence (1996)	Live at New Birth Cathedral (2003)

Transparent in Your Presence is the second and final gospel CD recorded by Byron Cage & Purpose. Published by Atlanta International Records, the album release also included a full concert video. It was recorded at New Birth Missionary Baptist Church in Atlanta, GA (Bishop Eddie L. Long, Pastor), and was released in the summer of 1996. The album peaked at #2 on the U.S. Gospel charts.

== Track listing ==
#	Title	Composer(s)	Time
1	Bishop's Sermon (Introduction)	Byron Cage	2:35
2	Higher	Byron Cage, Thomas Whitfield feat Greselda (Tiny) McLin-Middleton	1:30
3	All The Glory	Byron Cage	4:13
4	Hallelujah	Byron Cage	5:41
5	Rain	John Croslan II	4:00
6	At His Feet	B. Chase Williams & the Shabach Choir	4:03
7	My Sheep	Byron Cage	1:50
8	Forever I'll Worship	Byron Cage	3:29
9	Transparent	Byron Cage	4:45
10	Imagine Heaven	Edwin Hawkins	8:08
11	Thank You	Byron Cage	5:20
12	Just Knowing Jesus	Byron Cage, Thomas Whitfield	6:54
13	Working On The Building	Byron Cage	5:55
14	God's Word	Byron Cage	4:20
15	Mender	Byron Cage	6:05
16	He's There	James Brown	4:28
17	Thank You (reprise)	Byron Cage	1:24
