= Live at New Birth Cathedral =

Byron Cage: Live at New Birth Cathedral

Live album by Byron Cage
- Released: February 18, 2003
- Recorded: 2002
- Genre: Gospel, Worship & Praise
- Length: 54:53
- Label: GospoCentric Records
- Producer: Kurt Carr

Byron Cage chronology
| Transparent in Your Presence (1996) | Byron Cage: Live at New Birth Cathedral (2003) | An Invitation to Worship (2005) |

Byron Cage: Live At New Birth Cathedral (a.k.a. Prince of Praise) is the solo, self-titled, debut and third overall album by Byron Cage, released in 2003 on Gospocentric Records. The album was recorded live in Atlanta, Georgia and features production by famed gospel vocalist Kurt Carr.

Live at New Birth Cathedral peaked at #4 on the U.S. Gospel charts. It was named the Gospel Album winner of the 2004 Soul Train awards.

== Track listing ==
| # | Title | Composer(s) | Time |
|---|---|---|---|
| 1 | Intro | | 0:33 |
| 2 | Magnify | Michael Brooks | 5:13 |
| 3 | The Presence of the Lord Is Here | Kurt Carr | 7:02 |
| 4 | Thou Art a Shield for Me _{Psalm 3} | Freda Tapp | 5:01 |
| 5 | Interlude | | 1:42 |
| 6 | There Is a Name | Kurt Carr | 7:21 |
| 7 | Byron Cage Medley _{Glory Song/Yet Praise Him/Shabach} | Byron Cage, Tobias Fox, Walt Whitman | 8:03 |
| 8 | That's What You Are to Me | Kurt Carr | 3:45 |
| 9 | It Is to You | Donnie McClurkin | 3:01 |
| 10 | Glory to Your Name | Jimmy Fisher | 4:17 |
| 11 | Never Too Busy | Brent Jones | 3:44 |
| 12 | Still Say Yes | Thomas Whitfield | 5:11 |
