= Smokie Norful Live =

2009 live album by Smokie Norful

Live album by Smokie Norful
- Released: April 7, 2009
- Genre: CCM, Gospel
- Length: 65:05
- Label: EMI Gospel

Smokie Norful chronology
Life Changing (2006)	Smokie Norful Live (2009)	How I Got Over...Songs That Carried Us (2011)

Professional ratings
Review scores
Source	Rating
AllMusic	(favorable)

Smokie Norful Live is a live album from Contemporary Gospel singer Smokie Norful. The album was released on April 7, 2009, through EMI Gospel.

== Track listing ==
1. "He's Gonna Come Through" (feat. Tye Tribbett) - 4:56
2. "I Will Bless The Lord" - 6:07
3. "Justified" - 8:43
4. "Mighty God" - 6:10
5. "In The Presence Of The King" - 7:02
6. "Dear God" - 5:37
7. "No One Else" - 6:12
8. "Jesus Is Love" (feat. Heather Headley) - 6:41
9. "Don't Quit" - 7:07
10. "I've Been Delivered" - 6:30

== Awards ==
At the 41st GMA Dove Awards, the album was nominated to a Dove Award for Contemporary Gospel Album of the Year. The songs "Justified" and "Dear God" were also nominated to Dove Awards for Traditional Gospel and Contemporary Gospel Recorded Song of the Year respectively. "Justified" ended up winning its Dove Award. The album was also nominated for a Grammy Award for Best Contemporary R&B Gospel Album at the 52nd Grammy Awards.

== Chart performance ==
The album peaked at #55 on Billboard 200, #5 on Billboard's R&B/Hip-Hop Albums, and #1 on Billboard's Gospel Albums. It stayed 38 weeks on the R&B/Hip-Hop charts and 66 weeks on the Gospel charts.

== Charts ==
=== Weekly charts ===
Chart (2009)	Peak position
US Billboard 200	55
US Top Gospel Albums (Billboard)	1
US Top R&B/Hip-Hop Albums (Billboard)	5

=== Year-end charts ===
Chart (2009)	Position
US Top Gospel Albums (Billboard)	15
US Top R&B/Hip-Hop Albums (Billboard)	93

Chart (2010)	Position
US Top Gospel Albums (Billboard)	39
