= Shea Norman =

- Birth name: Alen VonShea Norman
- Also known as: Shea Norman
- Born: November 2, 1971; Memphis, Tennessee, U.S.
- Origin: Sheffield, Alabama, U.S.
- Died: October 26, 2017 (aged 45); Memphis, Tennessee, U.S.
- Genres: gospel, traditional black gospel, urban contemporary gospel
- Occupation(s): Singer, songwriter
- Instrument(s): vocals, piano, organ
- Years active: 2004–2017
- Labels: Verity

Minister Alen VonShea Norman (November 2, 1971 – October 26, 2017), who went by the stage name Shea Norman, was an American gospel musician. He started his music career, in 2004, with the release of My Heart Depends on You, by Verity Records. This would be his breakthrough release upon the Billboard Gospel Albums chart. The song, "'Tis So Sweet", was placed on the WOW Gospel 2005.

== Early life ==
Norman was born in Memphis, Tennessee, as Alen VonShea Norman, on November 2, 1971, where he was raised by a minister father the Reverend James A. Norman. His first church, where he got the chance to minister was the Church of God in Christ in Millington under the tutelage of Reverend Carl Payne. Up until his death, Norman was a member of New Growth in Christ Christian Center located in Memphis, for the last thirteen years. He was urged by God to help the ministry, Ekklesia Christian Church, located in Sheffield, Alabama, where he has been since 2012. The church is led by Apostle Kobie S. & Pastor Katina Fitzgerald.

== Music career ==
His music career commenced in 2004, with the album, My Heart Depends on You, that was released on September 14, 2004, by Verity Records. This album was his breakthrough release upon the Billboard magazine Gospel Albums chart at No. 17. While the song, "'Tis So Sweet", was placed on the compilation album WOW Gospel 2005.

== Death ==
Norman died of complications from diabetes in Memphis on October 26, 2017, at the age of 45.

== Discography ==
List of selected studio albums, with selected chart positions
Title	Album details	Peak chart positions
Title	Album details	US Gos
My Heart Depends on You	Released: September 14, 2004; Label: Verity; CD, digital download	17
