= Darrel Petties =

American gospel musician (born 1983)

- Born: Darrel Darnell Petties; December 17, 1983 (age 42)
- Origin: Memphis, Tennessee
- Genres: Gospel, traditional black gospel, urban contemporary gospel
- Occupations: Singer, songwriter, worship leader, pastor
- Instruments: vocals, singer-songwriter
- Years active: 2005–present
- Label: EMI Gospel
- Website: facebook.com/Darrel-Petties-Strength-In-Praise-73959257449/

Darrel Darnell Petties (born December 17, 1983) is an American gospel musician, worship leader and pastor. He performs urban contemporary gospel and traditional black gospel. He performs with his choir, Strength in Praise. His first album was Count It All Joy, released in 2006, from EMI Gospel. Two songs from the album, "Yes Lord" and "Thank Ya Jesus", charted on the Billboard magazine Gospel Songs chart. Two songs also appeared on the WOW Gospel Albums: in 2005, "Glory Hallelujah", and in 2007, "Thank Ya Jesus".

== Early life ==
Darrel Darnell Petties was born on December 17, 1983, He was raised in Memphis, Tennessee, the grandson and son of pastors and worship leaders.

== Career ==
His began recording in 2005, with the song "Yes Lord". It was released as a single and charted on Billboard Gospel Songs at No. 15. Count It All Joy was released on April 1, 2006, with EMI Gospel. The second song, "Thank Ya Jesus", peaked at No. 6 on the Gospel Songs chart. The songs, "Glory Hallelujah" and "Thank Ya Jesus", appeared on the WOW Gospel Albums in 2005 and 2007.

== Personal life ==
He lives in the Memphis, Tennessee-area, where he is the pastor at Mount Pisgah Missionary Baptist Church, in Olive Branch, Mississippi.

== Discography ==
- Count It All Joy (April 1, 2006, EMI Gospel)
- ‘New Season’ (December 17, 2018, ASCAP/SIPMusic)

Singles

Year	Single	Chart Positions
Year	Single	US Gospel Songs
2005	"Yes Lord"	15
2006	"Thank Ya Jesus"	6
