= Ted Winn =

American songwriter

- Also known as: Ted Winn
- Born: Joseph Theodore Winn; Memphis, Tennessee
- Genres: Urban contemporary gospel, gospel, traditional black gospel
- Occupations: Singer, songwriter
- Instruments: Vocals, singer-songwriter
- Years active: 1995–present
- Member of: Ted & Sheri

Ted Winn is a gospel recording artist and songwriter who first gained recognition as half of the award-winning Ted & Sheri gospel duo, with Sheri Jones-Moffett best known for their hits "Come Ye Disconsolate" and "Celebrate". Since 2009, Winn has been a popular solo artist with chart songs such as "The Lifter" and "God Believes in You" to his credit.

== Background ==
Ted Winn was born in Memphis, TN. Winn has been involved in music and arts from an early age. His mother Ann noticed his interest in music and arranged for him to have piano lessons. He graduated from the prestigious Overton Creative & performing Arts High School where he was also active in the school's choir. Following high school, he enlisted in the Air Force.

== Ted and Sheri Duo ==
After his military stint, Winn returned to Memphis where he joined Kevin Davidson & The Voices of Binghamton choir where he first met Sheri Jones Moffett. He presided over his own short-lived group Ted Winn & Deliverance before he and Moffett formed Ted & Sheri in 1995. At the same time, Winn began to sing with Richard Smallwood's Vision choir in 2000 as Moffett sang with Donald Lawrence & The Tri-City Singers. Winn was living in Atlanta and attending Morehouse College when he and Moffett landed a contract with Kirk Franklin's former radio promoter Neily Dickerson's Church House Records label in 1999. They recruited well-known production assists from gospel heavyweights Tonex, Myron Butler and Donald Lawrence. The resulting 2001 CD "The Healing Starts Here" received critical acclaim from gospel outlets such as Gospelflava.com. "This is a wonderfully strong debut on all fronts," Stan North wrote in a CD review.

The song that received the most radio attention was the duo's reprise of Roberta Flack and Donny Hathaway's "Come Ye Disconsolate." With backing by the Tri-City Singers, the song became a bona fide radio hit and earned the duo Stellar Awards as Best Duo or Group and Best Contemporary Duo or Group of 2002.

For their next project, the duo switched labels and showed up on Word Records where they released the "Celebrate" CD in fall 2004. Donald Lawrence wrote their radio single "Celebrate" which returned them to the Top Ten. Unfortunately, their album was released during an executive transition at the label. They didn't feel they received the proper promotional support and ended up leaving the label a year later.

== Solo career ==
After Ted & Sheri left Word Records, they decided to try solo careers. Moffet signed with EMI Gospel. Winn bankrolled the production of a song he wrote entitled "God Believes in You." He hired his own radio promoter and the song rose to # 23 on Billboard's Hot Gospel Songs chart and earned him a contract with Shanachie Entertainment. Aside from the track "Moving Forward," Winn wrote all of the material and brought in guest artists such as Vanessa Bell Armstrong, DeWayne Woods, Jonathan Nelson and Myron Butler for the ensuing "Balance" CD. The contemporary gospel album received high marks in the gospel community upon its autumn 2009 release. "It’s an impressive" debut," E.J. Gaines wrote on the Gospel Pundit blog. Gospelflava.com's Gerard Bronner called it, "worth the wait.”

In between music projects, Winn founded Veracity Entertainment, a music publishing administration company that represents and manages songwriters and producers. Among the songs that Veracity's clients have written and produced are T-Pain's "Can’t Believe It" (co-written by David `Preach’ Balfour), Trey Songz’ "Simply Amazing (written by Christopher `C4’ Umana), Vashawn Mitchell’s “Nobody Greater" (written by Darius Paulk), Earnest Pugh's "Rain on Us" (written by Daniel Moore Sr. and Daniel Moore II) and "Cold As Winter" that was written and produced by Christopher `C4’ Umana and Uforo `Taktix’ Ebong for Lupe Fiasco.

In December 2012, Winn performed a new song "You Are the Reason" on BET's "Bobby Jones Gospel" program and announced that he was working on a sophomore CD entitled, "Perspective," due for release in late 2013.

Among his songs are "In and Out", which was featured on the Top Ten singles of 2012 and released as an album on iTunes in 2013.

In 2014, he released the single "Love to Dream Of", featuring Justin Timberlake & Ella Maijo. On March 14, 2015, he released "Love to Dream", which was followed by the top ten hit "Love to Dream of". On May 18, 2017, he released the single "All I Want" featuring Kiiara.

In 2018, he released his second studio album: "Dreams from the West", in early 2018, and his first solo album: "Mornings With Marvin".

== Catalog ==
=== Billboard Top Gospel Albums ===
Album	Top Position	Label (Year)
Balance	23	Shanachie (2009)
Celebrate (as Ted & Sheri)	30	Word (2004)
The Healing Starts Right There	N/A	Church House (2001)

=== Billboard Hot Gospel Songs ===
Song	Top Position	Label (year)
More	17	Teddys Jamz/Shanachie (2015)
Connected to the Kingdom	26	Teddys Jamz (2010)
The Lifter	7	Teddys Jamz (2010)
God Believes in You	22	Teddys Jamz (2009)
Celebrate (as Ted & Sheri)	5	Word (2005)

== Awards and recognition ==
- RIAA Gold Certification, "WOW Gospel 2004" (03/06/04): "Come Ye Disconsolate”
- Stellar Award – Group or Duo of the Year (2002)
- Stellar Award – Contemporary Group or Duo of the Year (2002)
- GMWA Excellence Award – Best New Artist of the Year (2002)

=== Ted Winn Solo credits ===
- Bishop Eddie Long & Total Praise Choir – "Spirit & Truth" (EMI 2004)
- Percy Bady – "The Percy Bady Experience" (Gospocentric 2003)
- Judith McAllister – "Raise the Praise" (Judah 2003)
- Richard Smallwood & Vision – "Persuaded Live" (Verity 2001)
- Richard Smallwood & Vision – "Journey: Live in NY” (Verity 2007)
- Youthful Praise – “Exalted – Live” (Light Records 2007)
- Gregg Patrick & The Bridge Choir: Crossover (Tyscot Records 2008)

=== Ted & Sheri CD Cameos ===
- Mark Hubbard, Blessin’ Waitin’ on Me (Utopia Music Group 2004)
- Various Artists, “WOW Gospel 2004” (Verity 2003)
- Various Artists, “Gotta Have Gospel!” (Gospocentric 2003)
- Hezekiah Walker – Family Affair Vol. 2 Live at Radio City Music Hall (Verity 2002)
- Gerald Thompson – “Let the Church Say Amen” (AIR 1996))
