= Dwell Among Us =

Live album by Byron Cage & Purpose
- Released: March 10, 1995
- Recorded: 1994
- Genre: Gospel, Contemporary worship music
- Length: 57:41
- Label: Atlanta International Records Gospel
- Producer: Ryck Carter; Byron Cage

Byron Cage & Purpose chronology
Dwell Among Us (1995)	Transparent in Your Presence (1996)

Dwell Among Us is the debut gospel CD by Byron Cage & Purpose. Recorded in 1995, this live album produced contemporary worship music standards "Dwell Among Us", "The Blood" and "The Glory Song".

== Track listing ==
#	Title	Composer(s)	Time
1	Introduction - (with Bishop Eddie L. Long)		1:45
2	Rejoice In The Lord	Byron Cage	5:11
3	Lord Take Me Higher	Byron Cage, Thomas Whitfield	4:27
4	Jesus Will Fix It	Public Domain	6:35
5	Yielded Vessel	Byron Cage	6:58
6	Earth Has No Sorrow		6:01
7	The Glory Song	Byron Cage	3:47
8	Dwell Among Us	Byron Cage	6:08
9	Dwell Among Us (Reprise)		1:43
10	I'm Blessed	Byron Cage	6:26
11	Loving Hands	Byron Cage	3:48
12	The Blood		3:49
13	The Blood (Reprise)		1:03
