= Paul Poulton =

British musical artist (born 1956)

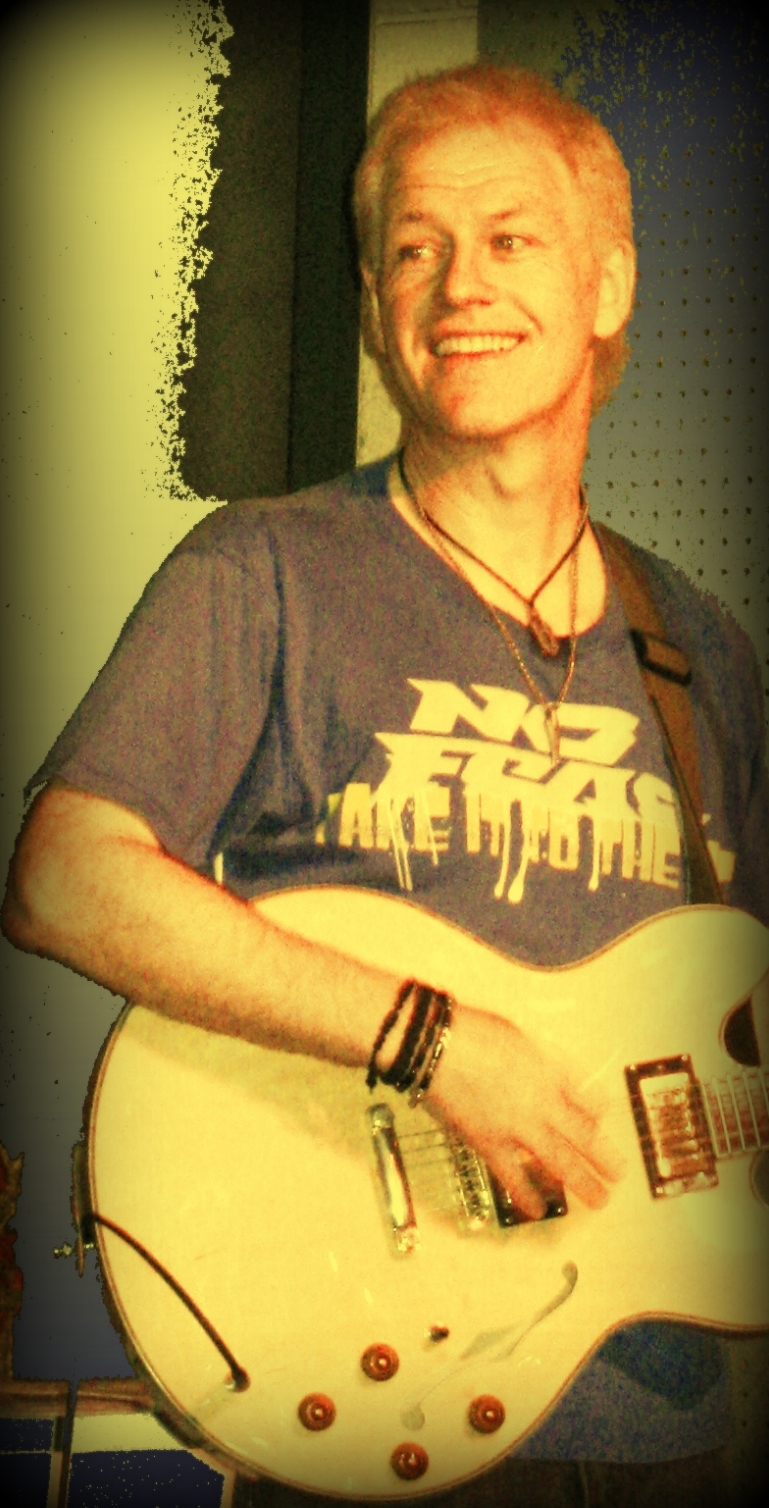

Background information
- Born: Paul Stephen Poulton; 3 July 1956 (age 70)
- Origin: West Bromwich, West Midlands, England
- Genres: Rock, gospel, R&B
- Occupations: Musician, composer, singer, author
- Instruments: Guitar, vocals
- Years active: 1989–present
- Labels: Big Feet Music, Chapel Lane, Word, Temporary Music.

Paul Poulton (born 3 July 1956) is a British singer-songwriter, guitarist and writer. Born in West Bromwich in the West Midlands, he has released fifteen albums, eight singles and four books since 1989. He has toured mainly in the UK and US. His song "Flaky People" was played by the Mid-West American radio station WQRP in the late 1990s.

Poulton performs as a solo performer with an acoustic guitar and also with his band the Paul Poulton Project. His song themes include relationships, human idiosyncrasies, Christian faith, God and philosophy.

Poulton has written for a number of sites and magazines including Cross Rhythms, the online edition of The Baptist Times, British Runner magazine and HeartBeat The Magazine.

== Discography ==
=== Albums ===
- I Think I'm Being Followed (1989 Big Feet Music/Temporary Music)
- Fallen People on a Fallen Planet (1990 Chapel Lane)
- Fallen People on a Fallen Planet (1992 Word Records)
- Fallen People on a Fallen Planet (Euro Mix) (1993 Chapel Lane)
- Body And Soul (1995 Chapel Lane)
- Soothing Saul (1996 Chapel Lane)
- Little Boy EP (1998 Chapel Lane)
- Flaky (1998 Temporary Music)
- Angel (2001 Temporary Music)
- Affected (2005 Temporary Music)
- Grooves 4 Scrooge (2008 Temporary Music)
- Dumb Dogs (2008 Temporary Music)
- Looking For Someone To Blame (2009 Temporary Music)
- Too Twitchy (2010 Temporary Music)
- Some People Believe Anything (2011 Temporary Music)
- Words (2013 Temporary Music)
- Heaven (2018 Temporary Music)
- The Return (2024 Temporary Music)
- Serious (2025 Temporary Music)

=== Singles ===
- "Too Many Things To Worry About" (2008 Temporary Music)
- "Wade in the Water" (2012 Temporary Music)
- "Get in the Spirit" (2012 Temporary Music)
- "Revelator (The Apostle John)"(2014 Temporary Music)
- "Stronger" (2014 Temporary Music)
- "Mistakes I've Made (Acoustic)" (2015 Temporary Music)
- "Distracted" (2016 Temporary Music)
- "Worker" (2018 Temporary Music)
- "It's Gone Well Past That" (2023 Temporary Music)

=== Books ===
- "Fishing for Praise" (2008 Wipf and Stock)
- "Genesis for Ordinary People" (2014 Wipf and Stock)
- "Exodus for Ordinary People" (2016 Wipf and Stock)
- "Genesis for Ordinary People - Second Edition" (2017 Wipf and Stock)
- "God and Primordial People" (2018 Wipf and Stock)
