= The Canton Spirituals =

American gospel group

The Canton Spirituals are an American gospel recording group founded in Canton, Mississippi in 1943.

== Background ==
The original Canton Spirituals from 1943 were Reverend Arthur Lee Jackson Sr., Reverend I.S. Watkins, Jim T Graham, Claude Nichols, Warren G. Ward, Isaac Bolton, Eddie Jackson, Theo Thompson, Roscoe Lucious and founder Harvey Lee Watkins Sr. (December 5, 1929 – November 16, 1994).

As of 2016, the group is fronted by Watkins' son, Harvey Watkins Jr., and consists of Billy Voss, David Curry, Merlin Lucious, Shannon Lee, Rodrick Jones and Antoine Porter Sr. This incarnation garnered a Grammy Award nomination in 1993 for the album Live in Memphis and were 1997 Stellar Award recipients for "Best Group/Duo of the Year" as well as "Traditional Group of the Year" for the Living the Dream: Live In Washington, DC album. In 1998, the group took home two awards at The American Quartet Awards for "Quartet of the Year" and "Artist of the Year".

On November 1, 2012, they released a single, "Keep Knocking". The album of the same name was released on December 3, 2013.

In 2026, they released a new single, "Still Winning".

== Discography ==
- That's My Train Fare Home (1977)
- On the Move (1978)
- I'm Coming Lord (1980)
- We'll See You in Church(1982)
- Everything Is Gonna Be Alright (1983)
- Meet the Same People (On Your Way Down) (1984)
- Mississippi Po' Boy (1985)
- Determined (1987)
- I'll Give It All To You (1990)
- Live in Memphis (1993)
- Live in Memphis II (1995)
- Living the Dream: Live In Washington, D.C. (1997)
- The Live Experience 1999 (1999)
- Walking By Faith (2002)
- New Life: Live In Harvey, IL (2004)
- Driven (2007)
- Keep Knocking (2013)
- Hallelujah Anyhow (2022)

== Personnel ==
- Harvey Watkins Jr. (1973–present): lead vocals, background vocals, bass guitar, guitars
- Merlin Lucious (1974–present): bass guitar, background vocals, drums
- David Curry III (2004–present): drums
- Billy Voss (2004–present): keyboards, background vocals
- Shannon Lee (present): keyboards, background vocals
- Rodrick Jones: (2012-2021): lead guitar
- Antoine Porter Sr. (2013–present): rhythm/lead guitar, background vocals
- Harvey Watkins Sr. (1946–1994): original member, deceased): lead vocals, background vocals
- Jordan Bester (minister): organ
- Joshua Myles (present): lead vocals, background vocals
- Micheal Richardson (1990–1995, 1999): drums
- Victor Allen (1990–2004; 2025-present): keyboards, background vocals
- Wallace Strickland (1990–2005): keyboards, background vocals
- Cornelius Dwayne Watkins (1974–present): lead guitar, background vocals
- Quincy McCullum (1996–1999): drums
- Ralph Lofton (1993-1995; 2002-2004): organ
- Norman Williams (1996–2000): organ
- Cadarius Price (present): lead vocals, background vocals
