= I Need You Now (album) =

Studio album by Smokie Norful
- Released: May 21, 2002; October 21, 2003 (limited edition)
- Genre: CCM, gospel
- Length: 50:07, 40:40 (Limited Edition)
- Label: EMI Gospel

Smokie Norful chronology
I Need You Now (2002)	Nothing Without You (2004)

Limited Edition

Professional ratings
Review scores
Source	Rating
AllMusic	4/5 stars
Vibe	2/5 stars

I Need You Now is the debut studio album from contemporary gospel singer Smokie Norful. The album was released on May 21, 2002 through EMI Gospel and Chordant Records.

I Need You Now: Limited Edition was released on the same labels on October 21, 2003. It is a sequel to I Need You Now, not an extended edition. It contains new versions of four of the tracks in the regular edition plus four new tracks.

== Track listing ==
All songs written by Norful, except where noted.

=== Regular edition ===
1. "It's All About You" (Antonio Dixon, Smokie Norful) - 4:55
2. "I Need You Now" - 4:11
3. "Life's Not Promised" (Joe Archie, DOA, Haskel Jackson) - 3:58
4. "Still Say Thank You" - 5:31
5. "Praise Him" (Norful, Logan Reynolds) - 3:58
6. "The Least I Can Do" (Norful, Reynolds) - 6:01
7. "Somethin', Somethin'" (DOA, Norful) - 4:57
8. "Same Sad Song" (DOA, Norful) - 4:37
9. "Just Can't Stop" (Yashawn Mitchell) - 3:30
10. "Psalm 64" - 3:49
11. "Same Sad Song" (Urban Remix) (DOA, Norful) - 4:40

=== Limited edition ===
1. "It's All About You" (Dixon, Norful) - 6:45
2. "Still Say Thank You" - 5:47
3. "You Gotta Right" (Marvin E. Wiley) - 2:33
4. "Praise Him" (Norful, Reynolds) - 4:59
5. "What I Need & What I Want" (Jamal H. Bryant) - 3:52
6. "He's All I Need" - 4:51
7. "I Need You Now" - 6:31
8. "O Holy Night" (Traditional) - 5:22

== Awards ==
At the 35th GMA Dove Awards, the limited edition won a Dove Award for Contemporary Gospel Album of the Year.

== Chart performances ==
The album peaked at no. 154 on Billboard 200, no. 26 on Billboard's R&B/Hip-Hop Albums, no. 13 on Billboard's Christian Albums, no. 6 on Billboard's Heatseekers, and no. 1 on Billboard's Gospel Albums. It stayed 104 weeks on the Gospel Albums charts and 38 weeks on the R&B/Hip-Hop charts. Also, the title song peaked at no. 96 on Billboard Hot 100.

The limited edition peaked at no. 90 on Billboard 200, no. 24 on R&B/Hip-Hop Albums, no. 3 on Christian Albums, and no. 1 on Gospel Albums. It stayed 55 weeks on the latter.
