= JoAnn Rosario =

American gospel/CCM singer, and a pastor (born 1974)

Joann Rosario
- Also known as: Joann Rosario
- Born: Joann Judith Rosario; June 3, 1974 (age 52); Chicago, Illinois, United States
- Origin: Atlanta, Georgia, United States
- Genres: Gospel
- Occupations: Gospel Singer and Pastor
- Instrument: Voice
- Years active: 1997-present

Joann Judith Rosario (born June 3, 1974) is an American gospel/CCM singer, and a pastor.

Rosario was born in Chicago to parents of Puerto Rican background. Her father is a pastor and she sang in his church as a child. Under her father's ministry, she recorded several live Spanish language worship albums and is known for introducing the gospel vocal sound to the Spanish Christian market. She began her professional career in 1997 as a background singer for Marvin Sapp, then left in 1999 to be a member of Fred Hammond's Radical for Christ. Hammond helped her launch a solo career in 2001 with her Spring 2002 debut album More, More, More. In 2003, Rosario was diagnosed with nodules on her vocal folds, and took an extended hiatus to treat the condition. She released a follow-up effort in 2005 and a third in 2007.

As a licensed Christian minister, Joann travels internationally, preaching and singing in English and Spanish. She is now pastoring in Austell, Georgia, Maranatha Life Church. Joann's latest book is Father, Here I Am, a 40-day devotional for women.

== Discography ==
- More More More (Verity/Zomba, 2002) U.S. Gospel #11
- Now More Than Ever (Verity/Zomba, 2005) U.S. Gospel #4
- Joyous Salvation (Zomba, 2007) U.S. Gospel #13
