= Maurette Brown Clark =

American gospel musician

- Also known as: Princess of Praise & Worship
- Born: Maurette Brown; 1966 (age 59–60); Long Island, New York
- Genres: gospel
- Occupations: Singer, songwriter
- Instruments: vocals, singer-songwriter
- Years active: 1998–present
- Labels: Verity, Atlanta International
- Website: maurettebrownclark.com

Maurette Brown Clark (born 1966; as Maurette Brown) is an American gospel musician. She started her solo music career in 1998 with the release of How I Feel on Verity Records. Her subsequent three albums were released by Atlanta International Records, with 2002's By His Grace, 2007's The Dream and 2011's The Sound of Victory. They all charted on the Billboard Gospel Albums chart. Clark has also been a member of Richard Smallwood's group, Vision, since its inception in 1996

== Early life ==
Clark was born on Long Island, New York, to musically inclined parents. She started singing at four years of age and began singing lessons at 6. She sang during her high school and collegiate days before touring with other gospel musicians.

== Music career ==
Clark's solo music career began in 1998 with the release of How I Feel on August 25 by Verity Records, which peaked on the Billboard Gospel Albums chart at #8. Her next releases were with Atlanta International Records. She By His Grace (released August 6, 2002) reached #12 on the Gospel Albums chart. The Dream (released March 6, 2007) reached #34. The fourth album, The Sound of Victory (released November 1, 2011) reached #6. Cross Rhythms' rated her first release a 6 out of 10; and second, 9 out of 10.

== Discography ==
List of studio albums, with selected chart positions
Title	Album details	Peak chart positions
Title	Album details	US Gos
How I Feel	Released: August 25, 1998; Label: Verity; CD, digital download	8
By His Grace	Released: August 6, 2002; Label: Atlanta International; CD, digital download	12
The Dream	Released: March 6, 2007; Label: Atlanta International; CD, digital download	34
The Sound of Victory	Released: November 1, 2011; Label: Atlanta International; CD, digital download	6
