= Anointed (band) =

American musical duo

- Origin: Columbus, Ohio, U.S.
- Genres: Contemporary Christian
- Years active: 1987–present
- Labels: Myrrh/Word, Epic
- Members: Steve Crawford; Da'dra Crawford-Greathouse
- Past members: Nee-C Walls-Allen; Mary Tiller-Woods
- Website: anointedonline.org

Anointed is a contemporary Christian music duo from Columbus, Ohio, known for their strong vocals and harmonies, featuring siblings Steve Crawford and Da'dra Crawford Greathouse, along with former members Nee-C Walls (who left the group in 2001) and Mary Tiller (who left in 1995). Their musical style includes elements of R&B, pop, rock, funk and piano ballads. The group has won seven Dove Awards, two Stellar Awards and three Grammy Award nominations. The group has also been featured on several Christian compilation albums such as Real Life Music, 1996 and WOW The 90s.

== History ==
Anointed was formed in 1988. They were all still in high school at that time. Their debut, Spiritual Love Affair, was released on Brainstorm Records in 1993 and distributed by WAL Records (Words Associated Labels), a subsidiary of Word.

=== 1995–2000 ===
In 1995 Anointed released their second album, The Call. This album would go on to become their best selling album to date, and to this day it is one of the best selling and popular contemporary Christian albums of the 1990s. The album won three Dove Awards, a Stellar award and a Grammy nomination. The group released Under the Influence in October 1996.

Following the release of the group’s self-titled fourth album in 1999, they embarked on an extensive tour, which proved both exciting and demanding. The pressures of this period ultimately led to the trio becoming a duo.

=== 2001–present ===
In 2001, the sibling duo headed for the studio to produce what would be their first brother and sister project.

If We Pray was released early fall 2001. However, in 2002, because of transitions in the label, Anointed requested to be released from their deal and they and Word records amicably parted ways. Following this, the band was signed on to the Sony Urban label and Now Is The Time was released on April 5, 2005.

Both Da'dra and Steve are currently leading worship and Pastoring at Lakewood Church in Houston, Texas. They have been there since 2006. They have also released solo projects within the last few years which have been digitally distributed.

== Discography ==
- 1993: Spiritual Love Affair (Sony Music/Epic Records/Word Records) debut studio album
- 1995: The Call (Sony/Epic/Myrrh)
- 1996: Under the Influence (Sony/Epic/Myrrh)
- 1999: Anointed (Myrrh/Word)
- 2001: If We Pray (Word Records)
- 2003: The Best of Anointed (Word Records) compilation album
- 2005: Now Is the Time (Sony Urban Gospel)

=== Single releases ===
- 1994: It's in God's Hands Now (Sony BMG)
- 1996: Under the Influence (Sony BMG)
- 2004: Gonna Lift Your Name (Sony Music/Columbia Records)
- 2012: Face To Face (Sony Music/Columbia Records)

Title	Year	Peak chart positions	Album
Title	Year	US Gospel	Album
"It's in God's Hands Now"	1994	—	The Call
"Under the Influence"	1996	—	Under the Influence
"Gonna Lift Your Name"	2004	8	Now Is the Time
"Face To Face"	2012	—	Non-album single
"—" denotes items which were not released in that country or failed to chart.

=== Video ===
Short form

- "The Call"
- "It's in God's Hands Now"
- "Under The Influence"

Long form

- Mercy Alive with Bryan Duncan Live in Concert
- One Voice With Bryan Duncan And Crystal Lewis Live in Concert
- 30 Years of the Dove Awards "Best Performances" with Michael W. Smith, Born Again Church Choir and Larnelle Harris Live in Concert

=== Other contributions ===
Background vocals on the song "Hooked", on the album "The Lady" by Vickie Winans (1991). MCA Records.

"Any Kind Of Love" on the Ben Tankard album, "Play Me In Your Key." (1994)

- "Beautiful" – special contribution to a Left Behind soundtrack
- "Second Chances", song featured on the soundtrack of the 2002 film Jonah: A VeggieTales Movie
- "Waiting in the Wings" (1996), song from Under The Influence featured on the compilation album Real Life Music
- "The Word" (1998), featured on the compilation album Songs From The Book
- "United We Stand" with Bryan Duncan (1994), featured on the compilation album Unforgettable Duets Vol 1
- "One Voice" (1998), featured on the compilation album Songs From The Book
- "The Word Was Made Flesh" (1996), featured on the compilation album Emanuel
- "Never Be Another" (2000) featured on the album Cool By George Duke
- "The Covenant" (1994), featured on the compilation album My Utmost For his Highest
- "Crown Him With Many Crowns" (1994), featured on the album I'll Lead You Home by Michael W. Smith
- "Joyful, Joyful We Adore Thee" with Michael W. Smith (1996), featured on the compilation album My Utmost For His Highest
- "Send Out A Prayer" (1997), featured on the compilation album Keep The Faith Collection "Power of Prayer"
- "Tet-A-Tet (Face To Face)" (1994) featured on the children's album Carman Yo Kidz! 2: The Armor of God

== Awards and nominations ==
GMA Dove Awards

- 1996: Contemporary Gospel Album of the Year for The Call
- 1996: Contemporary Gospel Recorded Song of the Year for "The Call" (from the album The Call)
- 1996: Urban Recorded Song of the Year for "It's in God's Hands Now" (from The Call)
- 1997: Urban Recorded Song of the Year for "Under the Influence" (from the album Under the Influence)
- 1998: Special Event Album of the Year for God With Us: A Celebration of Christmas Carols and Classics (along with Michael W. Smith, Twila Paris, Sandi Patty, Steven Curtis Chapman, Chris Willis, Steve Green, Cheri Keaggy, Avalon, Out of the Grey, Ray Boltz, Clay Crosse, CeCe Winans, Larnelle Harris; Norman Miller)
- 2000: Contemporary Gospel Album of the Year for Anointed
- 2000: Urban Recorded Song of the Year for "Anything Is Possible" (from Anointed)

Nominations

- 2006: Urban Contemporary Album of the Year, Now Is The Time
- 2006: Urban Recorded Song of the Year, "Gonna Lift Your Name" (from Now Is The Time)

Stellar Awards

- 1994: Best New Artist
- 1996: Album of the Year for The Call

Grammy Award nominations

- 1996: Contemporary R&B Gospel Album of the Year – The Call
- 1998: Contemporary Gospel Album of the Year – Under The Influence
- 2000: Contemporary Gospel Album of the Year – Anointed
