= Keith "Wonderboy" Johnson =

American gospel musician (1972–2022)

- Birth name: Keith Lamar Johnson
- Also known as: Wonderboy
- Born: May 17, 1972; Brooklyn, New York, U.S.
- Died: September 30, 2022 (aged 50); Atlanta, Georgia
- Genres: CCM, gospel, traditional black gospel, urban contemporary gospel
- Occupation(s): Singer, songwriter
- Instrument(s): Vocals, singer-songwriter
- Years active: 1998–2022
- Labels: World Wide Gospel, Worldwide, Verity, Central South, Blacksmoke

Keith Lamar Johnson (May 17, 1972 – September 30, 2022), who went by the stage name Wonderboy, was an American gospel singer-songwriter.

In 1998, he started his solo music career with the release of Through the Storm, published by World Wide Gospel Records. He released fourteen albums, over the course of thirteen years, with World Wide Gospel Records, Worldwide Records, Verity Records, Central South Records, and Blacksmoke Records. Eleven albums charted on the Billboard magazine Gospel Albums chart with other chartings on the Independent Albums and Heatseekers Albums charts.

== Early life ==
Johnson was born on May 17, 1972, in Brooklyn, New York, and he was given the moniker "Wonderboy" at the age of five because of his wondrous vocal acumen. He started singing with the Boys Choir of Harlem and his father Philip Johnson's quartet group the Spiritual Voices.

== Music career ==
His music career started in 1998, with the release of Through the Storm by World Wide Gospel Records, and this would be just one of eleven albums to chart on the Billboard magazine charts, with most of the chartings occurring on the Gospel Albums. A few placements were on the Independent Albums chart, for 2000's Live and Alive, 2001's Tribute to Quartet Legends, Vol. 1, and 2002's Send a Revival, and those just happen to be the albums that placed on the Heatseekers Albums chart. The labels he has released albums with are World Wide Gospel, World Wide Records, Verity Records, Central South Records, and Blacksmoke Records, and he has released fourteen albums with those labels over the course of his thirteen-year career. His backing vocalist and band are called the Spiritual Voices.

== Death ==
Johnson died on September 30, 2022, aged 50, after being found unresponsive at his home in Atlanta, Georgia.

== Discography ==
List of studio albums, with selected chart positions
Title	Album details	Peak chart positions
Title	Album details	US Gos
Through the Storm	Released: April 21, 1998; Label: World Wide Gospel; CD, digital download	25
Our Gift to You [World Wide Gospel]	Released: November 24, 1998; Label: World Wide Gospel; CD, digital download	–
Live and Alive	Released: January 25, 2000; Label: World Wide Gospel; CD, digital download	12
Would You	Released: October 3, 2000; Label: World Wide Gospel; CD, digital download	–
Tribute to Quartet Legends, Vol. 1	Released: February 6, 2001; Label: World Wide Gospel; CD, digital download	8
Send a Revival	Released: May 28, 2002; Label: World Wide Gospel; CD, digital download	4
New Season	Released: April 20, 2004; Label: Verity/World Wide Gospel; CD, digital download	12
Our Gift to You [Verity]	Released: September 28, 2004; Label: Verity; CD, digital download	–
Unity	Released: June 21, 2005; Label: World Wide Gospel; CD, digital download	20
Just Being Me	Released: May 9, 2006; Label: Verity; CD, digital download	23
The Best of Keith Wonderboy Johnson	Released: August 19, 2008; Label: World Wide Gospel; CD, digital download	37
Stronger Than Ever	Released: January 27, 2009; Label: Central South; CD, digital download	25
Back 2 Basics: Chapter Two	Released: 2011; Label: Central South; CD, digital download	20
Keep Pushin'	Released: 2018; Label: Shanachie; CD, digital download	20
Restructure, Renew & Reunion	Released: 2022; Label: Blacksmoke; Digital download	–
