= DeWayne Woods =

American gospel musician

- Born: DeWayne Lamont Woods; November 9, 1975 (age 50); Kansas City, Missouri
- Genres: gospel, urban contemporary gospel, traditional black gospel
- Occupations: Singer, songwriter
- Instruments: vocals, singer-songwriter
- Years active: 2003–present
- Labels: Jive, Verity, South Therapy
- Website: dewaynewoods.rocks

DeWayne Lamont Woods (born November 9, 1975) is an American gospel musician. He started his music career, in 2003, with the release of, The Poets, The Psalms, and the Psalmists, that was self-released. His second album, Introducing DeWayne Woods & When Singers Meet, was released in 2006, with Verity.This album would chart on the Billboard Gospel Albums chart. His third album, My Life's Lyric, was released in 2010 on Verity and Jive Records. The album charted on the aforementioned chart. He released, Life Lessons, in 2015 with Soul Therapy Music Group. This album would chart on the aforementioned chart along with the Independent Albums chart.

== Early life ==
Woods was born on November 9, 1975, in Kansas City, Missouri, as DeWayne Lamont Woods, to his mother Lillie.

== Music career ==
His music career got started by him working with Donald Lawrence and the Tri-City Singers. Then in 2003, he released his debut album The Poets, The Psalms, and the Psalmists, on July 24, 2003, that was self-released. The second album, Introducing DeWayne Woods & When Singers Meet, released on July 25, 2006 by Verity Records. This album charted on the Billboard Gospel Albums chart at No. 5. The album received a three and a half star review from AllMusic, while it got a nine out of ten rating by Cross Rhythms. He was recognized at the Stellar Awards as the Male Vocalist of the Year, for his work on this album. His third album, My Life's Lyric, released on June 22, 2010 by Verity and Jive Records. The album charted on the aforementioned chart at No. 3. This album was rated three and a half stars by AllMusic. He released, Life Lessons, on February 3, 2015 by Soul Therapy Music Group. This album charted on the aforementioned chart at No. 2, along with charting at No. 40 on the Independent Albums chart.

== Personal life ==
Woods contracted HIV from a sexual encounter.

He is an animal rights advocate.

== Discography ==
=== Studio albums ===
List of studio albums, with selected chart positions
Title	Album details	Peak chart positions	
Title	Album details	US Gos	US Indie
The Poets, The Psalms, and the Psalmists	Released: July 24, 2003; Label: Independent; CD, digital download	–	–
Introducing DeWayne Woods & When Singers Meet	Released: July 25, 2006; Label: Verity; CD, digital download	5	–
My Life's Lyric	Released: June 22, 2010; Label: Verity/Jive; CD, digital download	3	–
Life Lessons	Released: February 3, 2015; Label: Soul Therapy; CD, digital download	2	40
