= Myron Butler =

- Born: Myron Demond Butler; July 27, 1974 (age 51); Bradenton, Florida
- Origin: Dallas, Texas
- Genres: Christian contemporary R&B, gospel, soul, traditional black gospel, urban contemporary gospel
- Occupations: Songwriter, record producer, music director, vocalist, organist, pianist
- Years active: 1997–present
- Label: EMI Gospel
- Website: emigospel.com/artist/artist_default.aspx?aid=379353

Myron Demond Butler (born July 27, 1974) is an American gospel musician, record producer, singer-songwriter, music director, vocalist, organist and pianist. Most notably, he is known as the leader of the gospel choir, Myron Butler & Levi. Since 1997, he has worked as a vocal director and backup singer for several notable artists, including Kirk Franklin, Marvin Sapp, Smokie Norful, Donald Lawrence and Yolanda Adams.

== Biography ==
Butler was born as Myron Demond Butler, on July 27, 1974, just outside Tampa in the city of Bradenton, Florida, and he was raised in Dallas.

At an early age, Myron Butler developed an appreciation for music and, at 17, his first song, "Lift Him Up", was recorded by Dallas’ DFW Mass Choir. While working on the recording, Butler became good friends with the choir's director Kirk Franklin.

During his last two years of high-school, Myron formed a community choir of his teen-aged peers in Dallas, but, upon graduation, he left them to pursue a degree in psychology at Morehouse College in Atlanta, Georgia. After completing his first year, Butler decided not to return to school. He remained in Atlanta for a year before deciding to return to Dallas, where his choir had continued to grow, in spite of changes in personnel. The group, which had become popular in the area began calling itself God's Property and welcomed Myron as their main choral director.

Returning to Dallas allowed Myron Butler to renew his friendship with Franklin, and God's Property offered backup vocals for Franklin and The Family on occasional dates in and around Dallas. He would later join Franklin's group One Nation Crew for that group's short existence.

He also did a song with a Dallas-based youth choir called Total Praise on their CD "Faithfulness". Butler also serves as minister of music at Oak Cliff Bible Fellowship under the direction of Dr. Tony Evans in Dallas, Tx.

He married Timberlyn Butler on July 5, 2003.

== Discography ==
=== Albums ===
- Set Me Free (with Levi)
  Released November 8, 2005
  #18 (US Gospel)
- Stronger (with Levi)
  Released August 28, 2007
- Revealed – Live in Dallas (with Levi)
  Released March 30, 2010
- Worship
  Released January 24, 2012

=== Singles ===
- "Set Me Free"
  October 25, 2005
- "Stronger"
  July 19, 2007
- "Revealed"
- "Bless the Lord"
  August 9, 2011
- "Let Praises Rise" (2016)

== Filmography ==
- Donald Lawrence Presents the Tri-City Singers Finalé DVD April 4, 2006
- Stronger DVD October 2, 2007
- Marvin Sapp – Thirsty DVD
