= Darwin Hobbs =

- Born: Darwin Todd Hobbs; November 30, 1968 (age 57); Cincinnati, Ohio, U.S.
- Origin: Atlanta, Georgia, U.S.
- Genres: Gospel music
- Years active: 1999–present
- Label: EMI Gospel

Darwin Todd Hobbs (born November 30, 1968) is an American gospel music singer noted for his vocal similarity to classic soul singers Luther Vandross, Freddie Jackson and Lou Rawls. In addition to his career as a gospel artist, Hobbs and his ensemble The Darwin Hobbs Choir have also performed both studio and live background vocals for artists such as Switchfoot, Jars of Clay, BeBe Winans, Marvin Winans, CeCe Winans, Michael W. Smith, T.D. Jakes, Shirley Murdock, Michael McDonald, including a duet with the one and only "disco queen" Donna Summer and countless others. Hobbs also played a small acting role in the HBO movie Boycott. His single, "Everyday", appeared on the Soul Power compilation album.

== Discography ==
=== Albums ===
- Mercy (EMI Gospel, 1999)
- Vertical (EMI Gospel, 2000) (Billboard Gospel No. 26)
- Broken (EMI Gospel, 2003) (Billboard Gospel No. 3)
- Worshipper (EMI Gospel, 2005) (Billboard Gospel No. 8)
- Free (Tyscot Records, 2008)
- Champion (Imago Dei Music Group, 2010) (Billboard Gospel No. 6)

=== Singles ===
- "Everyday"
- "Nobody Like Jesus"
- "Beautiful to Me"
- "Free"
- "Champion"
