= Sheri Jones-Moffett =

American musician

- Born: Sheri LeTrice Jones; November 30, 1974 (age 51); Memphis, Tennessee
- Genres: urban contemporary gospel, gospel, traditional black gospel
- Occupations: Singer, songwriter
- Instruments: vocals, singer-songwriter
- Years active: 1992–present
- Labels: Motown Gospel, EMI Gospel
- Website: sjmoffett.com

Sheri Jones-Moffett (born November 30, 1974 Sheri LeTrice Jones), is an American gospel musician. She started her music career, in 2000, with the Tri City Singers, which was a group assembled and led by Donald Lawrence. Her solo career got started in 2009 with Renewed that was released by EMI Gospel. She got a Grammy Award nomination for Renewed at the 52nd Annual Grammy Awards in the Best Contemporary R&B Gospel Album category. She released the second album, Power & Authority, in 2014 by Motown Gospel. These albums both chart on the Billboard Gospel Albums chart.

== Early life ==
Jones-Moffett was born on November 30, 1974 as Sheri LeTrice Jones in Memphis, Tennessee.

== Music career ==
Her music career got started in 1992, with the group The Voices of Binghampton (later known as Kevin Davidson and The Voices). She along with fellow choir member Ted Winn left the group in 2000 to form the duo Ted & Sheri, releasing two albums in the early-2000s with one of them charting. After she left the duo, she started her solo career. She started her solo career, in 2009, with the release of Renewed on August 11, 2009 by EMI Gospel. The album would be her breakthrough release on the Billboard charts at No. 6 on the Gospel Albums chart. This album was rated an eight out of ten by Cross Rhythms' Donna Marshall. She got a Grammy Award nomination for Renewed at the 52nd Annual Grammy Awards in the Best Contemporary R&B Gospel Album category. Her second album, Power & Authority, was released on April 1, 2014 by Motown Gospel. This album would again chart on the Billboard Gospel Albums chart at No. 13. The album was rated three stars out of five by Andrew Greer at CCM Magazine. She is nominated at the 30th Stellar Awards for Traditional Female Vocalist of the Year.

== Personal life ==
Jones-Moffett is married to Dion Moffett, and they have two children Jamal Moffett And Khadera Moffett.

== Discography ==
List of studio albums, with selected chart positions
Title	Album details	Peak chart positions
Title	Album details	US Gos
Renewed	Released: August 11, 2009; Label: EMI Gospel; CD, digital download	6
Power & Authority	Released: April 1, 2014; Label: Motown Gospel; CD, digital download	13
