= Myron Butler & Levi =

American gospel choir

- Origin: Dallas, Texas, United States
- Genres: Gospel, soul
- Years active: 2002–present
- Label: EMI Gospel
- Members: Myron Butler; Robin Searight; Deonis Cook; Aisha Cleaver; Sedrick Jenkins; Bridgette Washington; Rachella Searight; Caltomeesh "Candy" West; Debette Mcintosh; Chelsea "Peaches" West; Aundria Ferrell
- Website: emigospel.com/artist/artist_default.aspx?aid=379353

Myron Butler & Levi is an American Black Gospel group considered to be the reincarnation of the God's Property choir (known for the 1997 Kirk Franklin hit "Stomp"). Under the direction of singer-songwriter and music producer Myron Butler, the group gained a Grammy nomination for its debut release Set Me Free and critical acclaim for its second album, Stronger.

== Discography ==
=== Albums ===
- Set Me Free – November 8, 2005 (#18, US)
- Stronger – August 28, 2007
- Revealed – March 30, 2010

=== Singles ===
- "Set Me Free" – October 25, 2005
- "Set Me Free" (3-track single) – June 6, 2006
  1. "Set Me Free"
  2. "Redeemed"
  3. "That Place"
- "Stronger" – July 19, 2007

== Filmography ==
- Stronger DVD October 2, 2007
