= Byron Cage =

American musician

- Born: December 15, 1962 (age 63)
- Origin: Grand Rapids, MI
- Genres: Gospel
- Occupation: Singer-songwriter
- Instrument: Vocals
- Years active: 1989–present
- Labels: Gospocentric
- Website: byroncageonline.com

Byron Louis Cage (born December 15, 1962) is an American gospel recording artist.

== Early years ==
Inspired by the singing of the late Rev. Donald Vails and Thomas Whitfield, Cage began singing gospel music as a teenager. Cage went on to attend Morehouse College in Atlanta, GA, where he was a member of the Morehouse College Glee Club. He also joined New Birth Cathedral in Atlanta. He also served as music director for Greater Grace Temple (PAW), in Detroit, Michigan. Byron Cage is also a member of Kappa Alpha Psi fraternity.

== Musical career ==
=== 1995–1998: Purpose and Full Gospel Baptist Fellowship Mass Choir ===
While signed to Atlanta International, Byron Cage & Purpose released two live recordings: Dwell Among Us in 1995, and Transparent in Your Presence in 1996. On both albums, Cage served as co-producer. Cage has also made a guest appearance with the Full Gospel Baptist Fellowship Church Choir and Bishop Paul S. Morton. He appeared on the albums "New Thing: Experience the Fullness" in 1996 and "Bow Down & Worship Him" in 1998.

=== 2003: Byron Cage (Live at New Birth Cathedral) ===
For his first recording with Gospocentric Records, and after having parted ways with Purpose, Byron Cage released his first solo LP Live at New Birth Cathedral with an accompanying DVD. His most celebrated work to date, Live showcases the production by labelmate Kurt Carr. The album garnered Cage five Stellar Award wins in 2004.

=== 2005: An Invitation to Worship ===
On Byron's second release from Gospocentric, An Invitation to Worship, he enlists the production of PAJAM, as evident on the track entitled 'We Love You", which features J Moss, a prominent member of the production trio. Cage won a Soul Train Award for best Gospel album, a Stellar Award for Song of the Year, and nominations for three Stellar Awards and a Grammy in 2007.

=== 2007: The Proclamation (Live at the Apollo) ===
Cage recorded a live CD/DVD entitled The Proclamation at the legendary Apollo Theater in New York City on April 26, 2007. The project featured special guests Kelly Price, Kim Burrell, & Dave Hollister and was produced by his An Invitation to Worship collaborators, PAJAM. Cage won a Stellar Award for Contemporary Male Vocalist of the year. The album was released on September 18, 2007.

=== 2009: Faithful to Believe ===
On Friday, March 13, 2009, Byron recorded Faithful to Believe live in Detroit. The album features special guests Tye Tribbett, Karen Clark Sheard, and Marvin Winans. Grammy Award winner and Israel Houghton's writing/producing partner Aaron Lindsey handled the production. Cage won Male Vocalist of the Year for this project. The album was released on October 27, 2009.

=== 2012: Memoirs of a Worshipper ===
On Tuesday, June 19, 2012, Byron released his next album Memoirs of a Worshipper recorded live at Christ Universal Temple in Chicago. The album featured special guest Fred Hammond, Clifton Ross, & Mumen "Mookie" Ngenge. Byron teamed up again on this project with Stellar Award-winning producer Aaron Lindsey. This album features the single Great and Mighty.

== Personal life ==
On May 22, 2004, Byron married pediatric dentist, Dr. Sonya Windham Cage, before 1,000 guests at Friendship Missionary Baptist Church in Charlotte, NC. They would later divorce.

Byron Cage served as minister of music at Ebenezer African Methodist Episcopal Church in Fort Washington, Maryland from the late 1990s to around 2014–16 (estimated). In June 2012, he served as the minister of music at The Saint Paul's Baptist Church in Richmond, Virginia. On January 14, 2018 Byron Cage became an ordained minister at New Mercies Christian church in Lilburn, Georgia and currently serves as the minister of music.

=== Albums ===
- 1995: Dwell Among Us
- 1996: Transparent in Your Presence
- 2003: Byron Cage: Live at New Birth Cathedral
- 2005: An Invitation to Worship
- 2007: Live at the Apollo: The Proclamation
- 2009: Faithful to Believe
- 2012: Memoirs of a Worshipper
- 2019 : Isolation

=== DVDs ===
- Byron Cage Live
- An Invitation to Worship
- Live at the Apollo: The Proclamation
- Faithful to Believe

== Filmography ==
- The Cosby Show

== Awards ==
Award	Year	Music	Category	Result
Stellar Awards	2007	An Invitation to Worship	Praise and Worship CD of the Year	Nominated
Stellar Awards	2007	I Will Bless the Lord	Song of the Year	Won
Stellar Awards	2007	An Invitation to Worship	Recorded Music Package of the Year	Nominated
Stellar Awards	2007	An Invitation to Worship	Male Vocalist of the Year	Nominated
Grammys	2006	An Invitation to Worship	New Gospel Album of the Year	Nominated
NAACP Image Awards	2006	An Invitation to Worship	Best Gospel Performance	Nominated
NAACP Image Awards	2006	An Invitation to Worship	New Gospel Album of the Year	Nominated
Stellar Awards	2004	Live at New Birth Cathedral	Male Vocalist of the Year	Won
Stellar Awards	2004	Live at New Birth Cathedral	CD of the Year	Won
Stellar Awards	2004	The Presence of the Lord Is Here	Song of the Year	Won
Stellar Awards	2004	Live at New Birth Cathedral	Producer of the Year	Won
Stellar Awards	2004	Live at New Birth Cathedral	Contemporary CD of the Year	Won
