= John P. Kee =

American gospel singer and pastor (born 1962)

- Also known as: "The Prince of Gospel Music"
- Born: John Prince Kee; June 4, 1962 (age 64); Durham, North Carolina, US
- Origin: Durham, North Carolina, US
- Genres: Gospel, praise and worship
- Occupations: Singer, songwriter, pastor
- Years active: 1986-present
- Labels: Tyscot (1987–1993); Verity (1994–present)
- Website: www.johnpkee.com

John Prince Kee (born June 4, 1962) is an American gospel singer and pastor.

Kee has been active for more than 35 years in the music field. He is primarily known for mixing traditional gospel with modern contemporary gospel, and for having a soulful husky voice. Kee is also known as "The Prince of Gospel Music".

In 2024, Kee fell seriously ill from an undisclosed illness that rendered him unavailable for a short period. Recently, in 2026, Kee disclosed that he had suffered from and underwent surgeries related to necrotizing fasciitis. The infection developed while he was being treated for prostate cancer.

== Early life and education ==
John P. Kee was born on June 4, 1962, in Durham, North Carolina. At an early age, he began developing his musical talent both instrumentally and vocally. He attended the North Carolina School of the Arts in Winston-Salem. At age 14, he and his brothers, Wayne and Al, moved to California. There, he began attending the Yuba College Conservatory School of Music in Marysville, California, where he was taught music theory by Bill Ashworth, the father of Grammy Award-winning music producer, Charlie Peacock. During this time, he began playing with various groups such as Cameo, Donald Byrd and the Blackbyrds.

Due to having a hard time adjusting in California, he moved to Charlotte, North Carolina (only to find himself living in a part of the city known for its violence and drug activities). After watching one of his friends being murdered in a drug deal gone bad, he rededicated his life back to God during a visitation to a revival meeting.

== Music career ==
In the mid-1980s, Kee formed a community choir in Charlotte known as the New Life Community Choir or "NLCC". Over time, the choir grew in popularity, and has continued to travel throughout the area. The choir also included Kee's own children.

In 1990, Kee founded the Victory in Praise Music and Arts Seminar Mass Choir, or "V.I.P." to fellowship with various ministries, songwriters, musicians and choir directors from all over the country.

In 2007, Kee was inducted into the Christian Music Hall of Fame.

In 2025, Kee received the BMI Trailblazer of Gospel Music Award.

== Discography ==
Solo albums

Title	Details	Peak chart positions			
Title	Details	US	US Gospel	US Heat	US R&B/HH
Yes Lord	Released: 1987; Label: Tyscot; Format: LP, Cassette, Digital	—	—	—	—
Just Me This Time	Released: August 30, 1990; Label: Tyscot; Format: CD, LP, Cassette, Digital	—	12	—	—
Colorblind	Released: April 26, 1994; Label: Verity; Format: CD, Cassette, Digital	—	4	—	—
The Color of Music	Released: August 10, 2004; Label: Verity; Format: CD, Digital	—	3	37	56
The Legacy Project	Released: January 18, 2011; Label: Verity; Format: CD, Digital	123	2	—	—
Level Next	Released: September 25, 2015; Label: Kee, Motown Gospel; Format: CD, Digital	—	4	—	—
I Made It Out	Releasing: September 13, 2019; Label: eOne Entertainment; Format: CD, Digital				
"—" denotes a recording that did not chart

With choir

Title	Details	Peak chart positions		
Title	Details	US	US Gospel	US Heat
Brethren in Unity (The New Life Community Choir)	Released: 1984; Label: Lipsong Music/Audio Concepts; Format: LP, Cassette, Digital	—	—	—
Wait on Him (The New Life Community Choir)	Released: 1989; Label: Jive; Format: CD, LP, Cassette, Digital	—	—	—
There is Hope (John P. Kee & Friends)	Released: 1990; Label: Format: CD, LP, Cassette, Digital	—	11	—
Wash Me (New Life Community Choir)	Released: May 7, 1991; Label: Jive; Format: CD, LP, Cassette, Digital	—	2	—
Never Shall Forget (Victory in Praise Choir)	Released: 1991; Label: Jive; Format: CD, Cassette, Digital	—	—	—
We Walk By Faith (feat. New Life Community Choir)	Released: 1992; Label: Verity; Format: CD, Cassette, Digital	—	—	—
Lily in the Valley (Victory in Praise Choir)	Released: 1993; Label: Format: CD, Digital	—	—	—
Show Up! (The New Life Community Choir)	Released: January 24, 1995; Label: Jive; Format: CD, Cassette, Digital	147	—	—
Stand (Victory in Praise Choir)	Released: February 27, 1996; Label: Jive; Format: CD, Digital	—	—	—
A Special Christmas Gift (feat. New Life Community Choir)	Released: September 13, 1996; Label: Jive; Format: CD, Digital	—	—	—
Strength (The New Life Community Choir)	Released: October 28, 1997; Label: Verity; Format: CD, VHS, DVD, Cassette, Digital	107	2	—
Any Day (Victory in Praise Choir)	Released: October 13, 1998; Label: Verity; Format: CD, Cassette, Digital	—	—	—
Not Guilty: The Experience (feat. New Life Community Choir)	Released: October 13, 2000; Label: Verity; Format: CD, Cassette, VHS, DVD	—	—	—
Mighty in the Spirit (Victory in Praise Choir)	Released: October 5, 2001; Label: Verity; Format: CD, Cassette, Digital	—	—	—
Blessed By Association (feat. New Life Community Choir)	Released: November 12, 2002; Label: Verity; Format: CD, Digital	—	—	—
Live at the Fellowship (Victory in Praise Choir)	Released: May 3, 2005; Label: Verity; Format: CD	—	24	—
The Reunion (The New Life Community Choir)	Released: December 6, 2005; Label: Verity; Format: LP, Digital	—	10	27
Nothing But Worship (The New Life Community Choir)	Released: September 4, 2007; Label: Verity; Format: CD, Digital	—	3	—
Live in Miami (feat. Victory in Praise Choir)	Released: September 2, 2008; Label: Verity; Format: CD, Digital	—	—	—
Life and Favor (feat. New Life Community Choir)	Released: August 28, 2012; Label: Kee Music Group; Format: CD, Digital, Stream	32	—	—
Life and Favor: Deluxe Edition (Includes John P. Kee's Book "Life and Favor: The Manual")	Released: 2013; Label: Kee Music Group; Format: CD/Book	—	—	—
"—" denotes a recording that did not chart

== Videography ==
- "It Will Be Alright" – 1990 (VHS)
- "Wash Me" – 1991 (VHS)
- "We Walk By Faith" – 1994 (VHS)
- "Show Up" – 1995 (VHS)
- "Stand" – 1996 (VHS)
- "Strength" – 1998 (VHS)
- "Not Guilty: The Experience" – 2001 (VHS/DVD)
- "Absolutely Live!" (compilation) – 2003 (DVD)
