= Donnie McClurkin =

American gospel singer (born 1959)

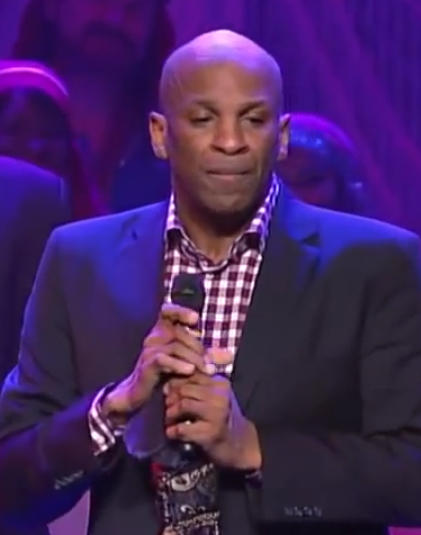
- McClurkin in 2013

Background information
- Born: Donald Andrew McClurkin, II; November 9, 1959 (age 66); Copiague, New York, U.S.
- Genres: Gospel; contemporary Christian; inspirational/worship
- Years active: 1980–present
- Labels: Verity; Word Entertainment
- Website: www.donniemcclurkin.com

Donald Andrew McClurkin Jr. (born November 9, 1959) is an American gospel singer and minister. He has won three Grammy Awards, ten Stellar Awards, two BET Awards, two Soul Train Awards, one Dove Award and one NAACP Image Awards. He is one of the top selling gospel artists, selling over 13 million albums. Variety dubbed McClurkin as a "Reigning King of Urban Gospel".

== Early life ==
McClurkin was born in Copiague, New York. When he was eight years old, his two-year-old brother was hit and killed by a speeding driver, which generated family turmoil. Shortly thereafter, McClurkin was a victim of childhood sexual abuse at the hands of his great uncle and, years later, by his great uncle's son. Two of his sisters dealt with substance abuse, and that's when the young McClurkin found solace in going to church and also through an aunt who sang background vocals with gospel musician Andraé Crouch.

By the time he was a teenager, he had formed the McClurkin Singers and later formed the New York Restoration Choir, with recordings as early as 1975. He released three albums with the New York Restoration Choir before departing to launch a solo career.

== Ministry ==
He was hired as an associate minister at Marvin Winans' Perfecting Church in Detroit, Michigan, in 1989. McClurkin served as an assistant to Winans for over a decade.

In 1991, a sharp pain and swelling, followed by internal bleeding, led, he says, to his diagnosis with leukemia. The doctor recommended immediate treatment, but McClurkin, who was then 31, decided instead to take his own advice. "I tell people to believe that God will save you," he says, "[and] I had to turn around and practice the very thing that I preached."

He was ordained and sent out by Marvin Winans in 2001 to establish Perfecting Faith Church in Freeport, New York, where he is senior pastor.

== Music ==
A friendship with a Warner Alliance executive resulted in his signing to the label for his 1996 self-titled LP, with producers Bill Maxwell, Mark Kibble of Take 6, Cedric and Victor Caldwell plus Andraé Crouch. The disc, which featured the perennially popular "Stand," went gold shortly after being publicly lauded by Oprah Winfrey. At the 48th Annual Grammy Awards, he won in the category Best Traditional Soul Gospel Album for "Psalms, Hymns & Spiritual Songs." McClurkin is best known for his hit songs "Stand" and "We Fall Down," which were played in heavy rotation on both Gospel and Urban radio. His three solo albums have topped the Billboard Charts

Dovetailing off the success of his near double platinum selling album, "Live in London and More," McClurkin released "Psalms, Hymns and Spiritual Songs" in 2005 and "We All Are One: Live In Detroit" in 2009, which also topped Billboard charts across various musical genres.

In 2014, McClurkin released "Duets" a collaborative album that features artists like Mary Mary’s Erica and Tina Campbell, Fred Hammond, John P. Kee, Dorinda Clark-Cole, Tramaine Hawkins, Israel Houghton and Tye Tribbett. The album debuted at No. 45 on the Billboard 200 and No. 4 on the Gospel Billboard charts. This was followed by his 2016 album, "The Journey," which debuted at number one on the Billboard Top Gospel Albums chart. It marked his seventh solo release and features live performances of some of his classics like “Speak to My Heart,” "Great Is Your Mercy," "Stand," and “That's What I Believe.” His 2019 release, "A Different Song," debuted at No. 2 on the Gospel Billboard charts.

In 2025, McClurkin released the single "Better Afterwhile," which reached No. 10 on the Billboard Hot Gospel Songs chart and led the Gospel Airplay chart. Recorded live at Trinity Broadcasting Network Studios, the song was written by McClurkin and produced by Tre’ Corley and Trent Phillips. The single blends traditional gospel elements with contemporary worship influences and received sustained national airplay across major and secondary gospel markets.

Following the success of the single, McClurkin announced that it would serve as the lead release for his final studio album titled "Finally", marking his first full-length project since 2019.

McClurkin's love for people and desire to share gospel music globally is the reason he includes a language medley—Japanese, Russian, Spanish, and Dutch — in most live performances.

In 2025, McClurkin publicly announced his departure from the music industry, citing a desire to focus on his ministry.

== Radio and television ==
Tom Versen and Tony Sisti of T&T Creative signed McClurkin to a radio syndication deal with advertising giant Dial Global Local and syndicator Gary Bernstein. T&T Creative provided a mobile recording studio in Pastor Donnie's church that he can also take on the road. He is quoted as saying, "As much as I love music and singing, I really love doing radio and the direct feedback I get from my listeners all over the country. I never thought I would be having this much fun doing radio, and I could touch and impact so many beautiful people."[19]

In 2009, he also broadcast his own television series, Perfecting Your Faith, on cable television. His television appearances include Good Morning America, CBS’s The Early Show, The View, Girlfriends and The Parkers. He has also been featured in such films as The Gospel and The Fighting Temptations. He played a Single man or a church pastor.

== Personal life ==
McClurkin, in 2002, told a Christian website that, due to sexual abuse and porn, he had struggled with homosexuality. "McClurkin believes he "turned" gay because of childhood molestation and traumatic exposure to pornography but was able to reverse his orientation through "will and prayer." He also said that he had rejected that "lifestyle": "I’ve been through this and have experienced God’s power to change my lifestyle. I am delivered, and I know God can deliver others, too."

McClurkin's listing as a headlining performer for then-Senator Barack Obama's 2008 Presidential campaign stirred controversy because of his views on homosexuality. As a result, McClurkin was removed from the performance roster but he still performed at one of the concerts. In August 2013, McClurkin was disinvited from the 50th anniversary of the March on Washington for Jobs and Freedom as his ex-gay status was seen as disruptive. In 2015 he spoke out against same-sex marriage in response to the U.S. Supreme Court making it legal nationwide.

McClurkin has a son, Matthew, born in 2000. McClurkin is also related to singer Marsha McClurkin of the short-lived new jack swing group Abstrac.

In 2018, McClurkin survived a serious road accident after he lost consciousness while driving.

=== Sexual misconduct allegations ===
In January 2026, McClurkin was sued for sexual assault by Giuseppe Corletto, a former personal assistant from 2004 to 2008. The lawsuit, filed in the Manhattan Supreme Court, states Corletto met McClurkin in 2003 after reading his autobiography, in which McClurkin wrote he had been delivered from homosexuality. Corletto became McClurkin's assistant in 2004, and within two years, the lawsuit states McClurkin began to grope him during "pray the gay away" sessions. The lawsuit states that the abuse also took place at McClurkin's Perfecting Faith Church and continued for several years during work trips. After an alleged sexual assault in 2013, McClurkin wrote an email apologizing for his actions, in which he allegedly referred to himself as a "dirty old man". McClurkin's attorney responded the allegations were "categorically false."

== Discography ==
=== Studio albums ===
List of studio albums, with selected chart positions and sales figures
Title	Album details	Peak chart positions				Certifications
Title	Album details	US	US Gospel	US Christ.	US R&B /HH	Certifications
Donnie McClurkin	Released: October 29, 1996; Label: Warner Alliance	—	4	14	—	RIAA: Gold
Duets	Released: February 28, 2014; Label: RCA Inspirational	45	4	—	—	

=== Live albums ===
List of live albums, with selected chart positions and sales figures
Title	Album details	Peak chart positions				Certifications	Sales
Title	Album details	US	US Gospel	US Christ.	US R&B /HH	Certifications	Sales
Live in London and More...	Released: August 22, 2000; Label: Verity Records	69	1	1	22	RIAA: Platinum	US: 1,300,000
Again	Released: March 4, 2003; Label: Verity Records	31	1	3	12	RIAA: Gold	
Psalms, Hymns and Spiritual Songs	Released: October 26, 2005; Label: Zomba Label Group	12	1	—	5	RIAA: Platinum	
We All Are One (Live in Detroit)	Released: December 2, 2008; Label: Verity Records	26	1	—	7		
The Journey (Live)	Released: August 19, 2016; Label: RCA Records	—	1	—	—		
A Different Song	Released: November 15, 2019; Label: RCA Records	—	2	—	—		

=== Compilations ===
List of compilation albums, with selected chart positions and sales figures
Title	Album details	Peak chart positions				Certifications	Sales
Title	Album details	US	US Gospel	US Christ.	US R&B /HH	Certifications	Sales
The Collection	Released: May 29, 2001; Label: Savoy	—	—	—	—		
The Essential Donnie Mcclurkin	Released: September 25, 2007; Label: Verity Records	—	9	—	—		
Playlist: The Very Best of Donnie McClurkin	Released: September 15, 2009; Label: Verity/Legacy Recordings	—	9	—	57		
Donnie McClurkin: Double Play	Released: 2010; Label: Verity Records	—	—	—	—		
Setlist: The Very Best of Donnie McClurkin (Live)	Released: December 27, 2011; Label: Sony	—	28	—	—		

=== Singles ===
==== As a lead artist ====
List of singles, as a lead artist, with selected chart positions, showing year released and album name
Title	Year	Peak chart positions				Album
Title	Year	US Bub.	US Gospel	US Adult R&B	US R&B /HH	Album
"Stand"	1996	—	—	—	—	Donnie McClurkin
"Speak to My Heart"	1996	—	—	—	—	Donnie McClurkin
"We Fall Down"	2000	24	— (Note: "We Fall Down" did not enter the US Billboard Hot Gospel Songs chart, but peaked at number 24 on the US Gospel Streaming Songs chart.)	2	40	Live in London and More...
"The Prayer" (featuring Yolanda Adams)	2003	—	—	35	—	Again
"I Call You Faithful"	2005	—	1	—	—	Psalms, Hymns and Spiritual Songs
"Ooh Child" (featuring Kirk Franklin)	2005	—	13	36	—	Psalms, Hymns and Spiritual Songs
"Church Medley"	2006	—	5	—	—	Psalms, Hymns and Spiritual Songs
"Wait on the Lord" (featuring Karen Clark Sheard)	2009	—	2	40	—	We All Are One (Live in Detroit)
"Donnie's Christmas Songs"	2011	—	—	40	—	—N/a
"I Am Amazed" (featuring Erica Campbell & Preashea Hilliard)	2013	—	15	—	—	Duets
"We Are Victorious" (featuring Tye Tribbett)	2014	—	7	—	—	Duets
"Stand"	2014	—	—	—	—	The Journey
"I Need You"	2014	—	2	—	—	The Journey
"There Is God"	2018	—	18	—	—	A Different Song
"My Favorite Things"	2018	—	23	—	—	—N/a
"Not Yet"	2019	—	21	—	—	A Different Song
"Better Afterwhile"	2025	—	10	—	—	Non-album single
"—" denotes releases that did not chart or were not released in that territory.

==== As a featured artist ====
List of singles, as a featured artist, with selected chart positions, showing year released and album name
Title	Year	Peak chart positions				Album
Title	Year	US Bubb. Under Hot 100	US Gospel	US Adult R&B	US R&B /HH	Album
"I Speak Life" (Donald Lawrence & Co. featuring Donnie McClurkin)	2006	—	23	—	—	I Speak Life
"Bless Me" (J.J. Hairston & Youthful Praise featuring Donnie McClurkin)	2014	—	9	—	—	I See Victory
"See the Goodness" (VaShawn Mitchell featuring Donnie McClurkin)	2023	—	12	—	—	Chapter X: See The Goodness
"—" denotes releases that did not chart or were not released in that territory.

== Videography ==
- Live in London and More... (VHS) (2001)
- Again (VHS) (2004)
- Psalms, Hymns & Spiritual Songs (VHS) (2005)

Music Videos

- "Stand"
- "We Fall Down"
- "The Prayer" (with Yolanda Adams)
- "Ooh Child" (with Kirk Franklin)
- "I Need You"

== Filmography ==
Film

- 1998: The Prince of Egypt (wrote and sang "I Am" & "Humanity")
- 2003: The Fighting Temptations
- 2004: Apollo at 70: A Hot Night in Harlem
- 2004: The Donnie McClurkin Story: From Darkness to Light
- 2005: The Gospel

Television

- 2001: Girlfriends (TV show)- Season 2 Ep 7 “Trick or Truth”
- 2002: The Parkers (TV show)- Season 3 Ep 16 “Make a Joyful Noise”
- 2002: 17th Annual Stellar Gospel Music Awards – co-host
- 2004: 19th Annual Stellar Gospel Music Awards – co-host
- 2005: 20th Annual Stellar Gospel Music Awards – co-host
- 2006: 21st Annual Stellar Gospel Music Awards – co-host
- 2006: An Evening of Stars: Tribute to Stevie Wonder (documentary)
- 2009: 24th Annual Stellar Gospel Music Awards – co-host
- 2010–15: BET's Sunday Best – judge
- 2010: 25th Annual Stellar Gospel Music Awards – host

== Awards and nominations ==
=== BET Awards ===
The BET Awards are awarded annually by the Black Entertainment Television network. McClurkin has received 2 awards from 5 nominations.

Year	Award	Nominated work	Result
2001	Best Gospel Artist	Himself	Won
2003	Best Gospel Artist	Himself	Nominated
2004	Best Gospel Artist	Himself	Nominated
2005	Best Gospel Artist	Himself	Won
2014	Best Gospel Artist	Himself	Nominated

=== Dove Awards ===
The Dove Awards are awarded annually by the Gospel Music Association. McClurkin has won 4 awards from 13 nominations.

Year	Award	Nominated work	Result
1997	Contemporary Gospel Album of the Year	Donne McClurkin	Nominated
1998	Contemporary Gospel Recorded Song of the Year	"Speak To My Heart"	Nominated
2001	Traditional Gospel Recorded Song of the Year	"We Fall Down"	Won
2001	Contemporary Gospel Recorded Song of the Year	"That's What I Believe"	Nominated
2001	Contemporary Gospel Album of the Year	Live in London and More	Nominated
2004	Contemporary Gospel Album of the Year	...Again	Nominated
2005	Traditional Gospel Recorded Song of the Year	"Through the Fire" (with The Cobbs Family)	Won
2006	Contemporary Gospel Album of the Year	Psalms, Hymns & Spiritual Songs	Nominated
2010	Male Vocalist of the Year	Himself	Nominated
2010	Contemporary Gospel Recorded Song of the Year	"Wait on the Lord"	Nominated
2011	Traditional Gospel Album of the Year	Duets	Won
2017	Traditional Gospel Album of the Year	The Journey Live	Won
2020	Traditional Gospel Album of the Year	A Different Song	Nominated
2023	Traditional Gospel Recorded Song	"See the Goodness" (with VaShawn Mitchell)	Nominated

=== Grammy Awards ===
The Grammy Awards are awarded annually by the National Academy of Recording Arts and Sciences. McClutkin has won 3 awards from 5 nominations.

Year	Award	Nominated work	Result
1998	Best Contemporary Soul Gospel Album	Donnie McClurkin	Nominated
2004	Best Contemporary Soul Gospel Album	...Again	Won
2006	Best Traditional Soul Gospel Album	Psalms, Hymns & Spiritual Songs	Won
2006	Best Gospel Performance	"I Call You Faithful"	Nominated
2010	Best Gospel Performance	"Wait on the Lord" (with Karen Clark Sheard)	Won

=== Soul Train Awards ===
The Soul Train Music Awards are awarded annually. McClurkin has received 2 awards from 5 nominations.

Year	Award	Nominated work	Result
2002	Best Gospel Album	Live In London	Won
2004	Best Gospel Album	Donnie McClurkin... Again	Nominated
2006	Best Gospel Album	Psalms, Hymns & Spiritual Songs	Won
2014	Best Gospel/Inspirational Song	"We Are Victorious" (with Tye Tribbett)	Nominated
2016	Best Gospel/Inspirational Song	"I Need You"	Nominated

=== Stellar Awards ===
The Stellar Awards are awarded annually by SAGMA. McClurkin has received 12 awards from 24 nominations.

Year	Award	Nominated work	Result
2000	Contemporary Male Vocalist of the Year	The Prince of Egypt Inspirational	Won
2000	Male Vocalist of the Year	The Prince of Egypt Inspirational	Won
2001	New Artist of the Year	The McClurkin Project	Nominated
2002	Artist of the Year	Live In London and More	Won
2002	CD of the Year	Live In London and More	Won
2002	Male Vocalist of the Year	Live In London and More	Won
2002	Traditional CD of the Year	Live In London and More	Won
2002	Traditional Male Vocalist of the Year	Live In London and More	Won
2002	Music Video of the Year	Live In London	Won
2004	Music Video of the Year	"The Prayer" (with Yolanda Adams)	Nominated
2004	Music Video of the Year	...Again	Nominated
2004	Contemporary Male Vocalist of the Year	...Again	Nominated
2004	Male Vocalist of the Year	...Again	Nominated
2004	Producer of the Year	...Again	Nominated
2006	Artist of the Year	Psalms, Hymns & Spiritual Songs	Nominated
2006	Traditional Male Vocalist of the Year	Psalms, Hymns & Spiritual Songs	Nominated
2007	Music Video of the Year	"Ooh Child" (with Kirk Franklin)	Nominated
2008	Contemporary Group/Duo of the Year	We Praise You	Won
2008	Group or Duo of the Year	We Praise You	Nominated
2010	Traditional Male Artist of the Year	We All Are One (Live in Detroit)	Won
2017	Traditional Male Artist of the Year	The Journey (Live)	Won
2017	Male Vocalist of the Year	The Journey (Live)	Nominated
2021	Traditional Album of the Year	A Different Song	Nominated
2021	Traditional Male Artist of the Year	A Different Song	Won

=== Miscellaneous honors ===
Year	Organization	Award	Nominated work	Result
2004	Michigan's International Gospel Music Hall of Fame		Himself	Inducted
