= Verity Records =

American gospel music-focused record label

- Parent company: Provident Label Group
- Founded: 1994
- Status: Active
- Distributor: Sony Music Entertainment
- Genre: Gospel music
- Official website: Official website

Verity Records is an American gospel music-focused record label, founded in 1994. The gospel group operated by Provident Label Group, which in turn is owned by Sony Music Entertainment.

== Artists ==
- 21:03
- Crystal Aikin
- Deitrick Haddon
- DeWayne Woods
- Donald Lawrence
- Donnie McClurkin
- Fred Hammond
- Kirk Franklin
- Jason Nelson
- John P. Kee
- Bishop Hezekiah Walker
- Marvin Sapp
- Kurt Carr
- Richard Smallwood
- William Murphy
- Byron Cage
- Deon Kipping
- Maurette Brown Clark
- Shea Norman
- Yolanda Adams
- Israel Houghton
