= Smokie Norful =

American gospel singer and pianist (born 1975)

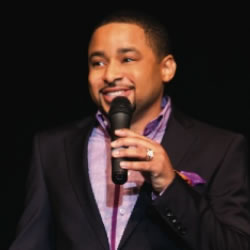

Background information
- Born: Willie Ray Norful, Jr. October 31, 1975 (age 50)
- Origin: Pine Bluff, Arkansas; Muskogee, Oklahoma, U.S.
- Genres: Gospel, worship
- Occupations: Singer, songwriter, pastor
- Instruments: Vocals, piano
- Years active: 2002–present
- Website: http://getthevictory.org

Willie Ray "Smokie" Norful Jr. (born October 31, 1975) is an American gospel singer and pianist.

== Career ==
Norful is best known for his 2002 album, I Need You Now and his 2004 release, Nothing Without You, which won a Grammy at the 47th Annual Grammy Awards for Best Contemporary Soul Gospel Album in 2004. Norful received his second Grammy in 2015 at the 57th Annual Grammy Awards for his song "No Greater Love", ten years after winning his first.

== Discography ==
=== Albums ===
List of albums, with selected details, chart positions and certifications
Title	Details	Peak chart positions	Certifications
Title	Details	US	Certifications
I Need You Now	Released: 2002; 2003 (re-release); Label: Chordant Music Group; EMI (re-release)	154	RIAA: Gold
Nothing Without You	Released: 2004; Label: EMI Gospel	57	RIAA: Gold
Life Changing	Released: 2006; Label: EMI Gospel	56	
Smokie Norful Live	Released: 2009; Label: Tre'Myles Music/EMI	55	
Smokie Norful Presents Victory Cathedral Choir	Released: 2010; Label: EMI Gospel	121	
How I Got Over...Songs That Carried Us	Released: 2011; Label: Tre'Myles Music/EMI	131	
Once in a Lifetime	Released: 2012; Label: Tre'Myles Music/EMI	116	
Forever Yours	Released: 2014; Label: Tre'Myles Music	67	

=== EPs ===
List of EPs, with selected chart positions
Title	Details	Peak chart positions
Title	Details	US
Smokie Norful: Limited Edition	Released: 2003; Label: EMI Gospel	90
