= List of best-selling gospel music artists =

The following list of list of best-selling gospel music artists includes music acts from the 20th century to the present who have recorded gospel music. This information cannot be listed officially, as there is no organization that has recorded global music sales.

== Best-selling gospel music artists ==
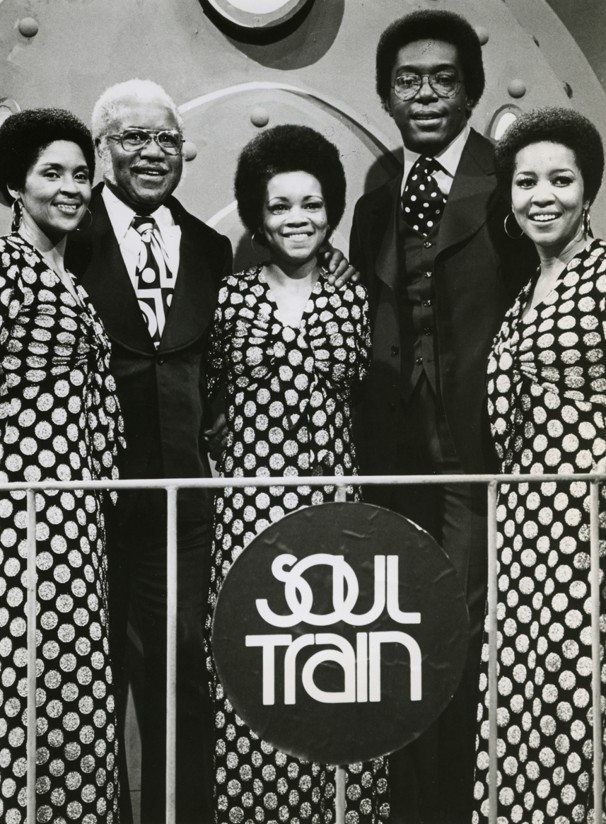
The Staple Singers

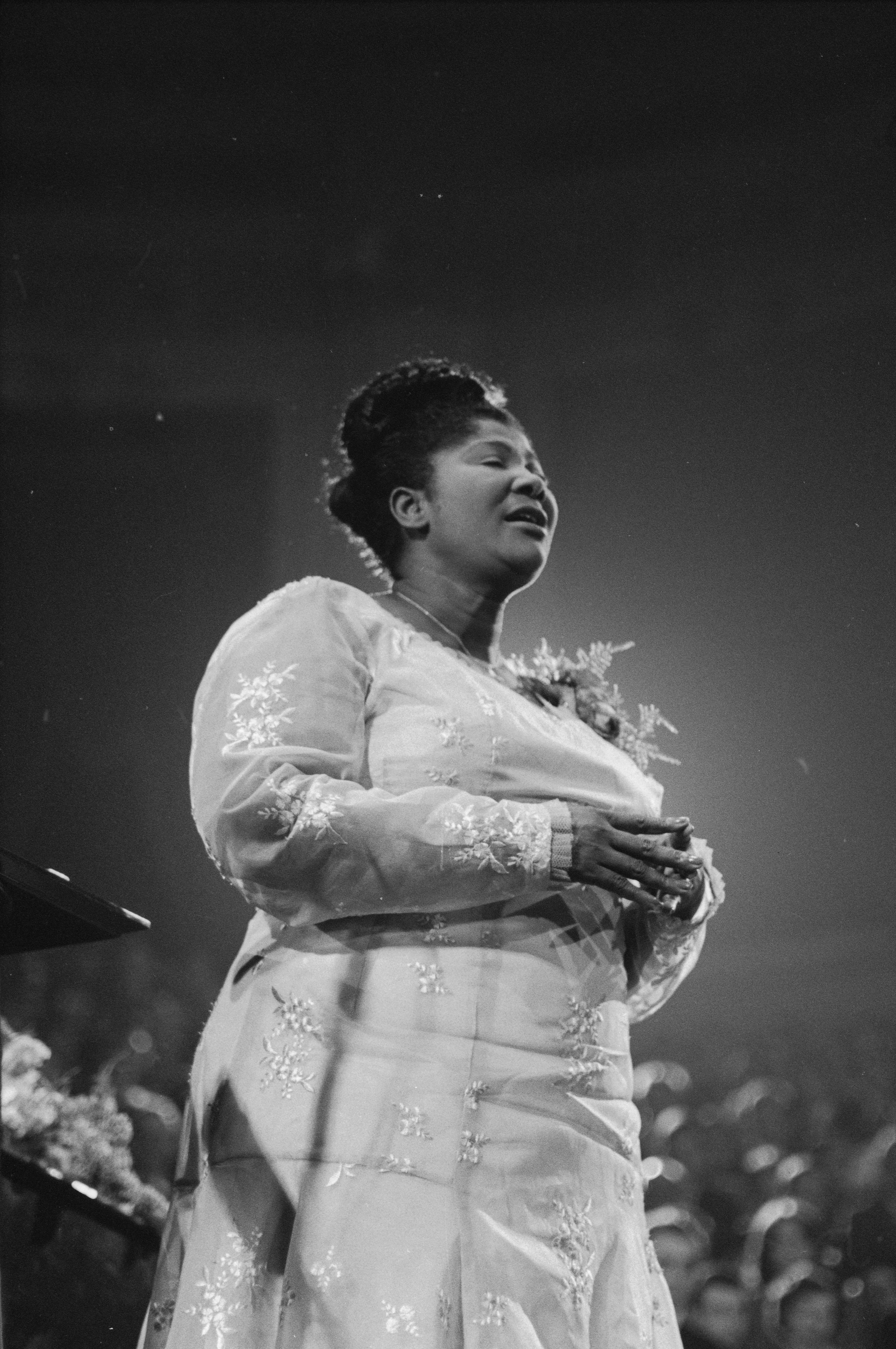
Mahalia Jackson

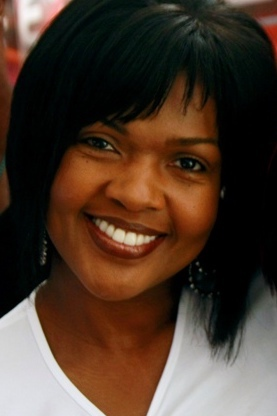
CeCe Winans

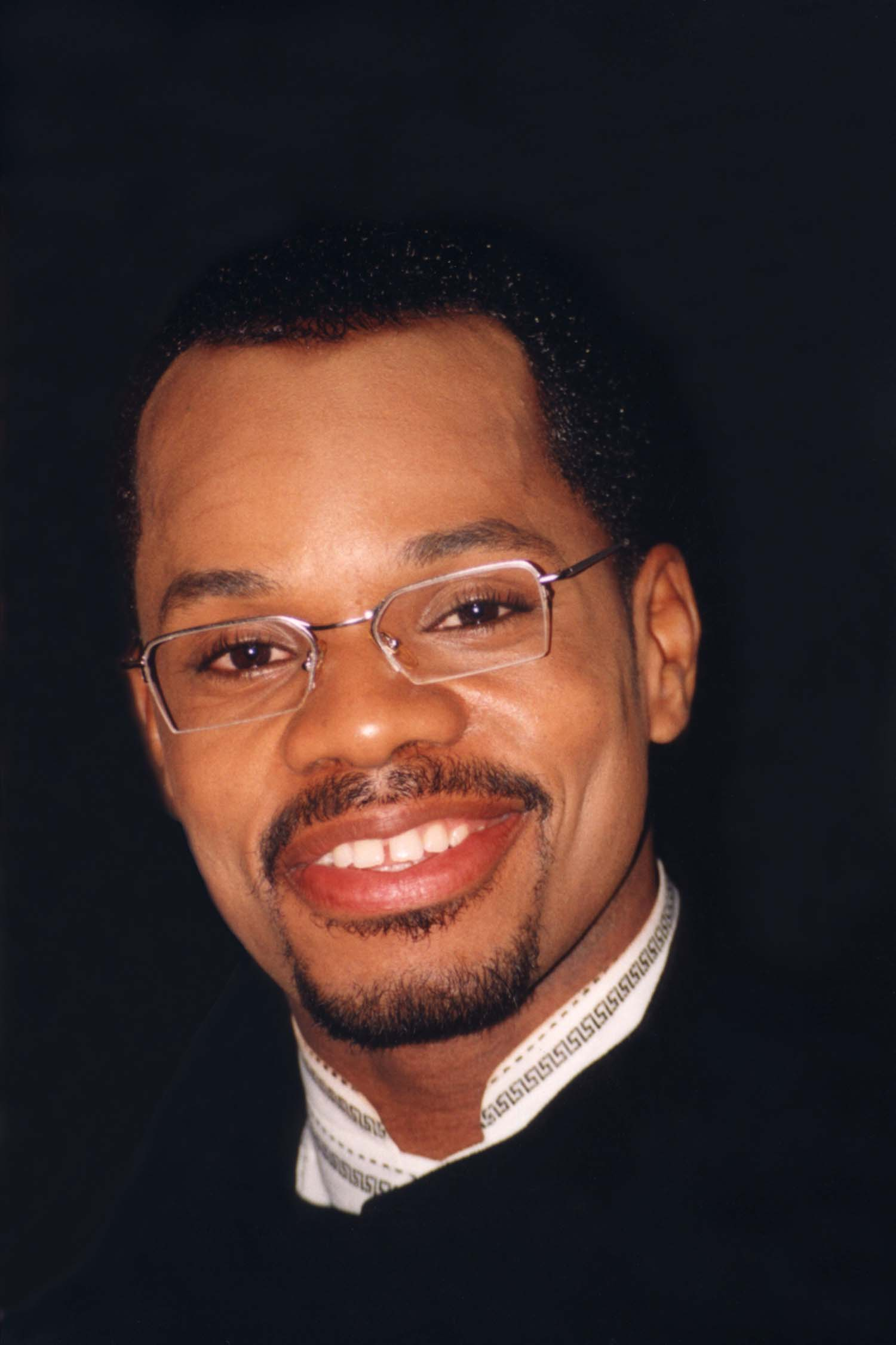
Kirk Franklin

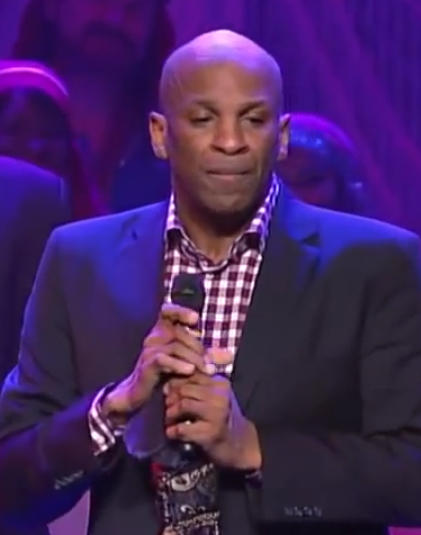
Donnie McClurkin

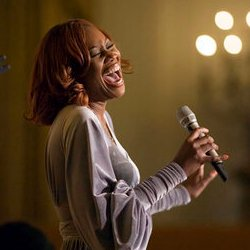
Yolanda Adams

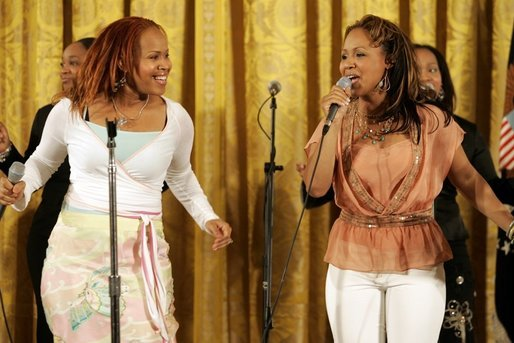
Mary Mary

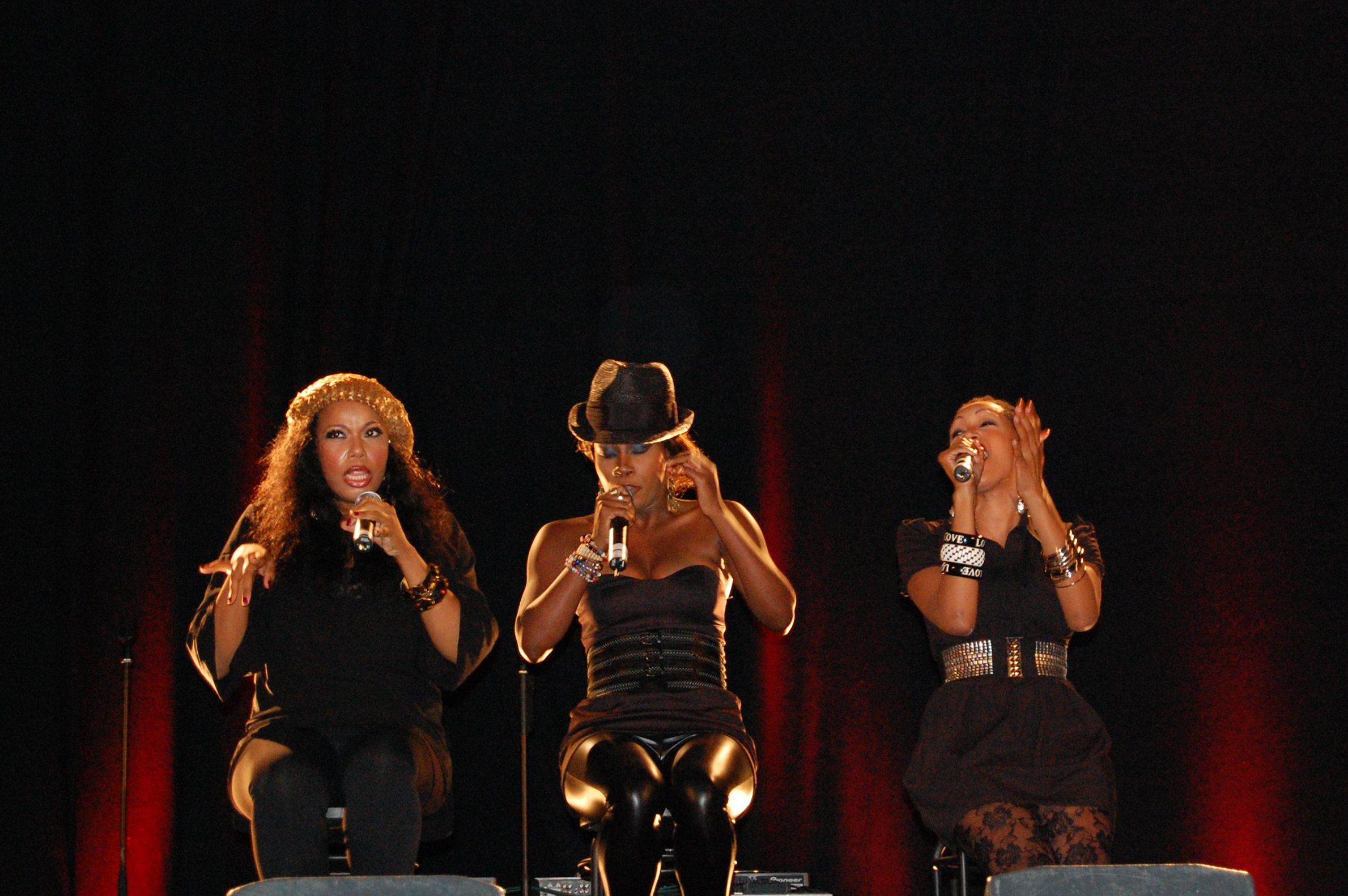
Trin-i-tee 5:7

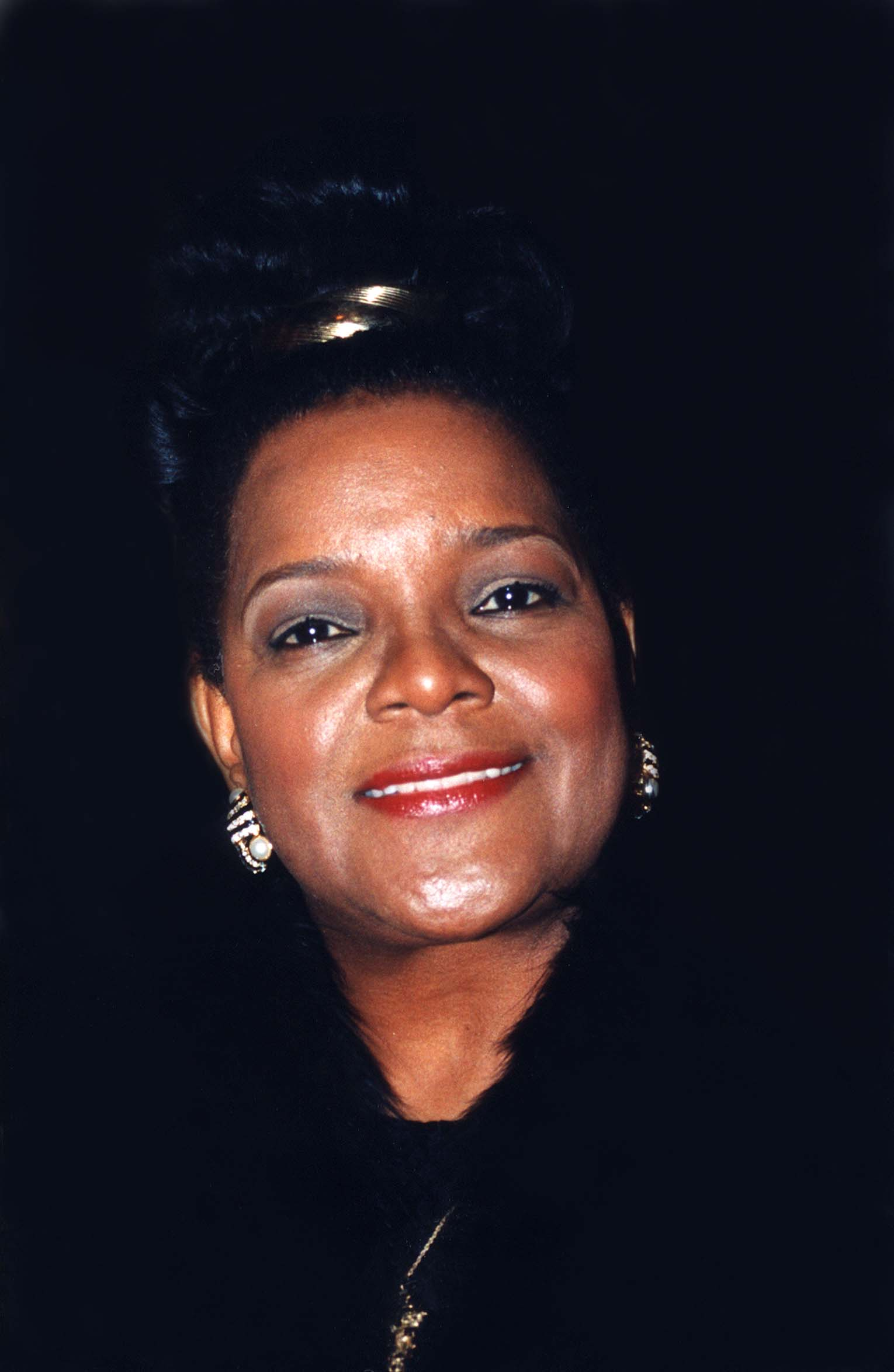
Shirley Caesar

| Artist | Country | Period active | Release-year of first charted record | Genre | Total certified units | Claimed sales |
|---|---|---|---|---|---|---|
| The Staple Singers | United States | 1940s–1990s | 1967 | Gospel, soul, country soul, R&B | 3.7 million: UK: 200,000; US: 3.5 million | 30 million |
| Mahalia Jackson | United States | 1920s–1970s | 1958 | Traditional gospel music, spirituals, blues | —N/a | 22 million |
| CeCe Winans | United States | 1980s–2020s | 1984 | Contemporary Gospel, gospel, Adult Contemporary R&B, CCM | 7.55 million: US: 7.55 million | 17 million |
| Kirk Franklin | United States | 1990s–2020s | 1993 | Contemporary Gospel, gospel | 14.6 million: US: 14.6 million | 15 million |
| Donnie McClurkin | United States | 1990s–2020s | 1996 | Contemporary Gospel, gospel | 3.05 million: US: 3.05 million | 13 million (Note: 13 million; 10 million) |
| Yolanda Adams | United States | 1990s–2020s | 1987 | Contemporary Gospel, gospel, inspirational, new-age | 3 million: US: 3 million | 10 million |
| Mary Mary | United States | 1990s–2020s | 2000 | Contemporary gospel, adult contemporary R&B, Contemporary R&B | 4.715 million: AUS: 70,000; BEL: 25,000; NZ: 5,000; SWE: 15,000; UK: 600,000; US: 4 million | 8 million |
| Fred Hammond | United States | 1980s–2000s | 1991 | Contemporary gospel, gospel, CCM | 4 million: US: 4 million | 8 million |
| The Edwin Hawkins Singers | United States | 1960s–2010s | 1969 | Gospel | 1 million: US: 1 million | 7 million |
| BeBe & CeCe Winans | United States | 1980s–2020s | 1984 | Adult Contemporary R&B, contemporary gospel, gospel | 2 million: US: 2 million | 5 million |
| Brooklyn Tabernacle Choir | United States | 1970s - 2000s | 1990 | Contemporary gospel | 0.05 million: US: 0.05 million | 4 million |
| Smokie Norful | United States | 2000s–2020s | 2002 | Contemporary gospel, gospel, inspirational | 1 million: US: 1 million | 3 million |
| Trin-i-tee 5:7 | United States | 1990s–2020s | 1998 | Contemporary gospel, gospel | 0.5 million: US: 0.5 million | 2.5 million |
| Shirley Caesar | United States | 1950s–2020s | 1975 | Contemporary gospel, traditional gospel | 0.05 million: US: 0.05 million | 2.29 million |
| Andraé Crouch | United States | 1960s - 2000s | 1977 | Contemporary gospel, gospel | —N/a | 1 million |
| Mississippi Mass Choir | United States | 1980s - 2000s | 1989 | Contemporary gospel, traditional gospel, gospel | —N/a | 1 million |
| Out of Eden | United States | 1990s - 2000s | 1994 | Contemporary gospel, CCM | —N/a | 1 million |

== Best-selling gospel songs ==
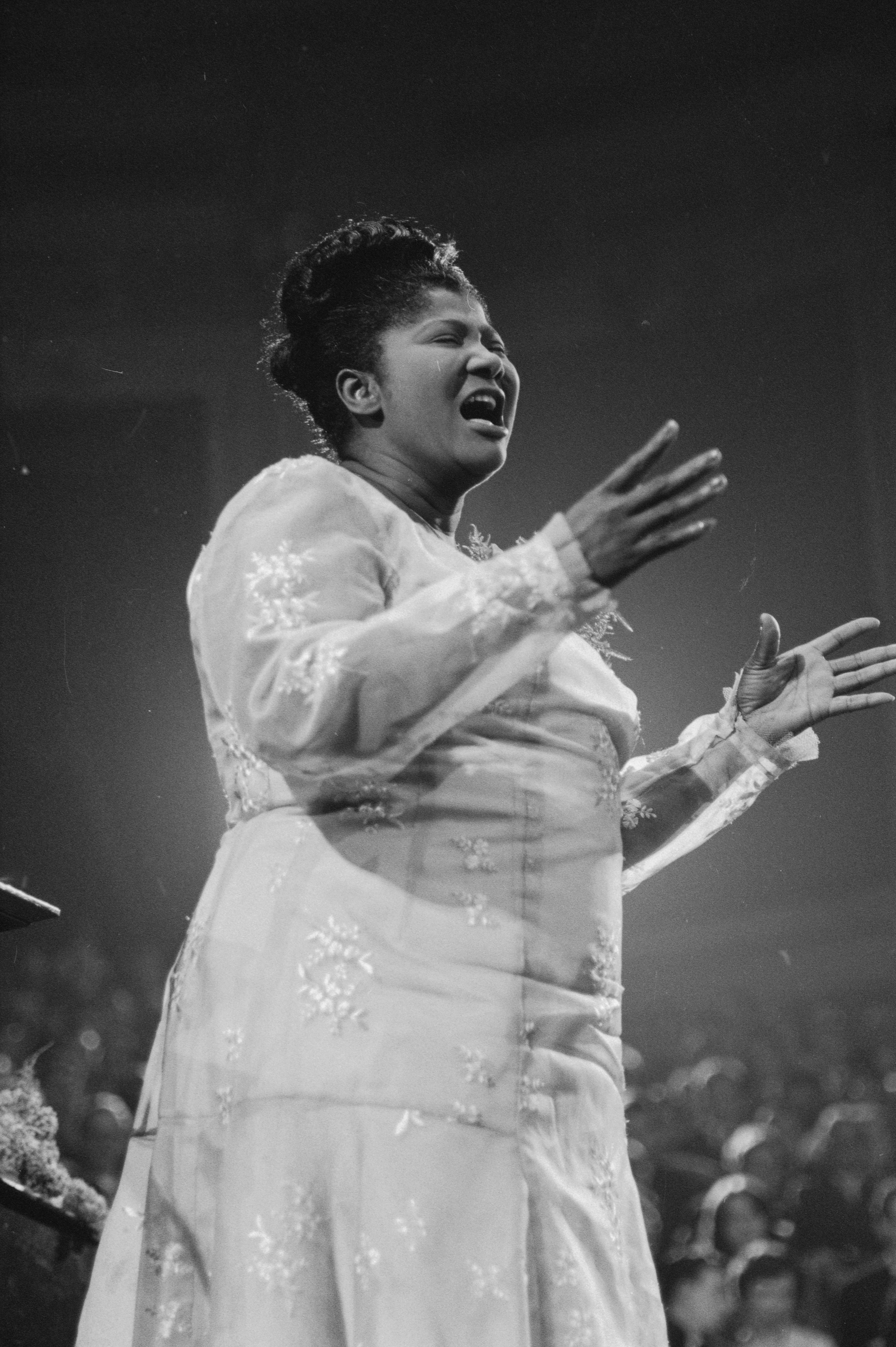
Mahalia Jackson

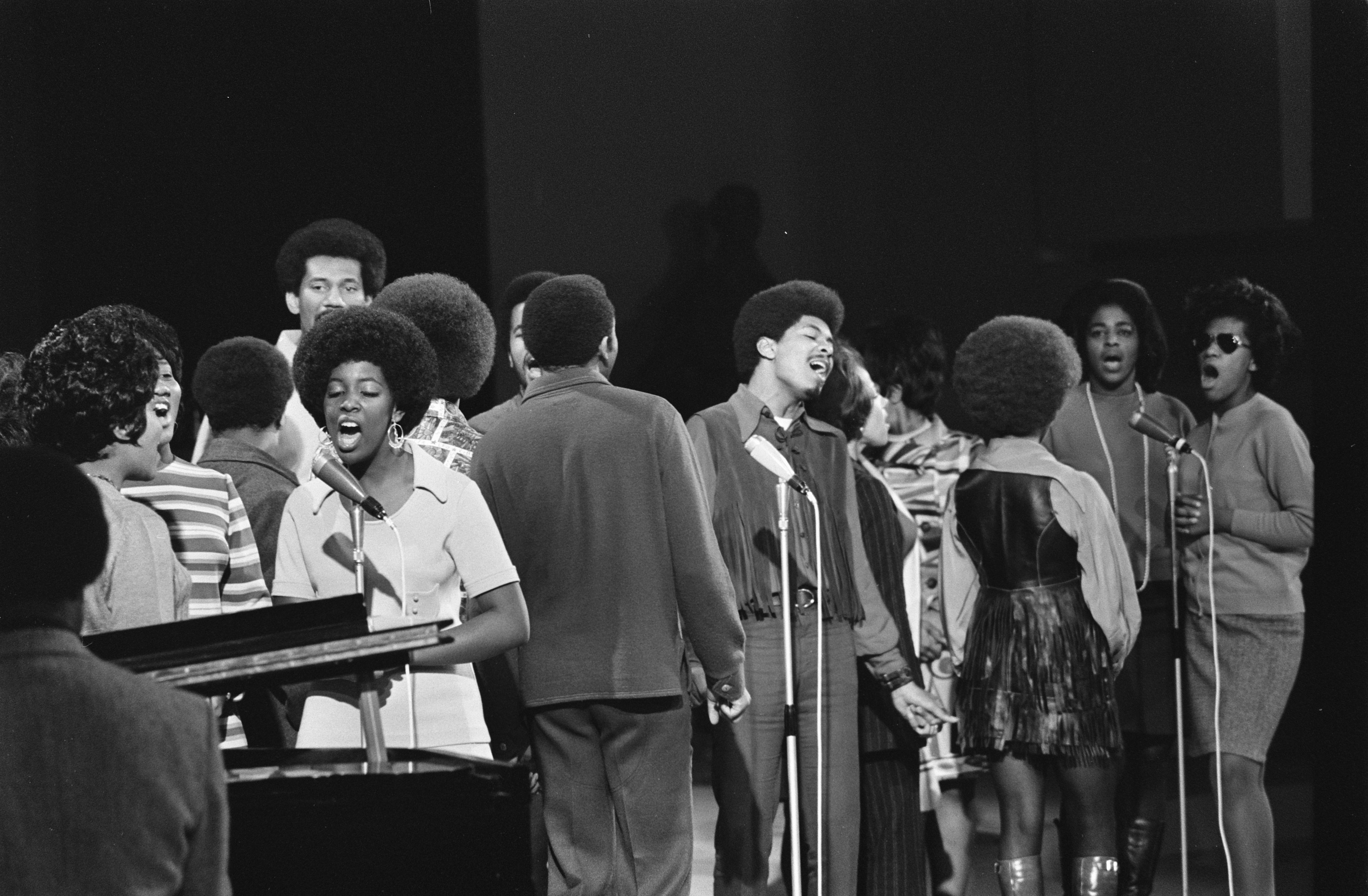
The Edwin Hawkins Singers

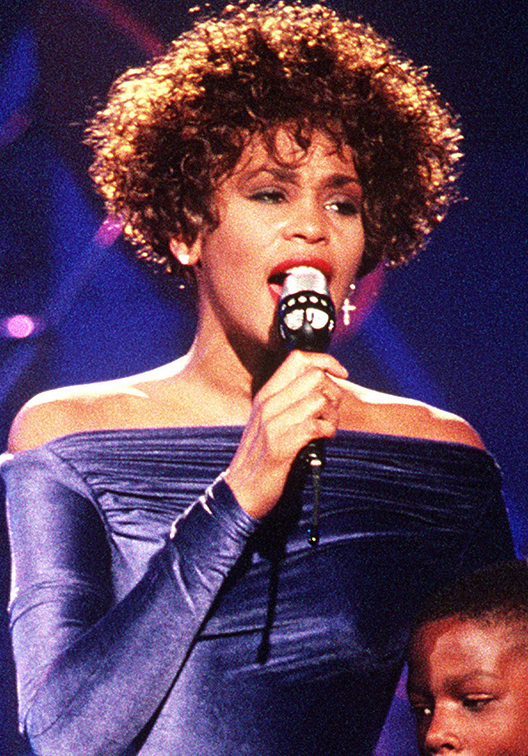
Whitney Houston

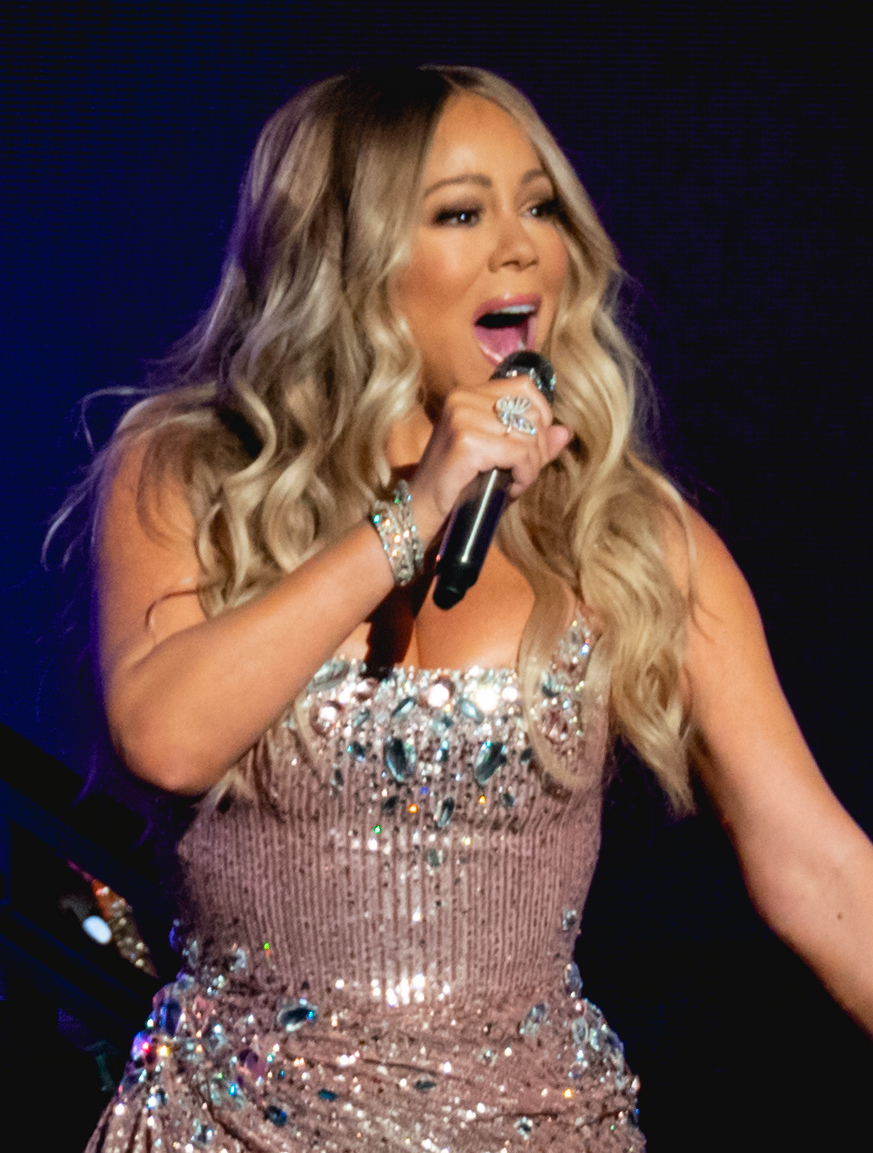
Mariah Carey

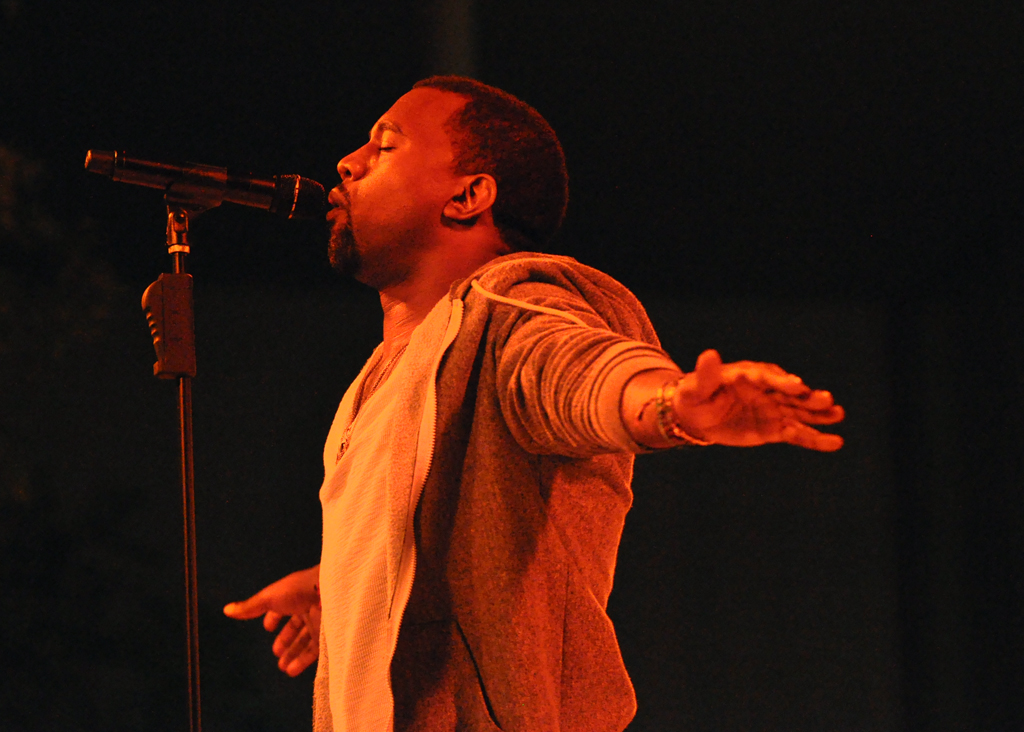
Kanye West

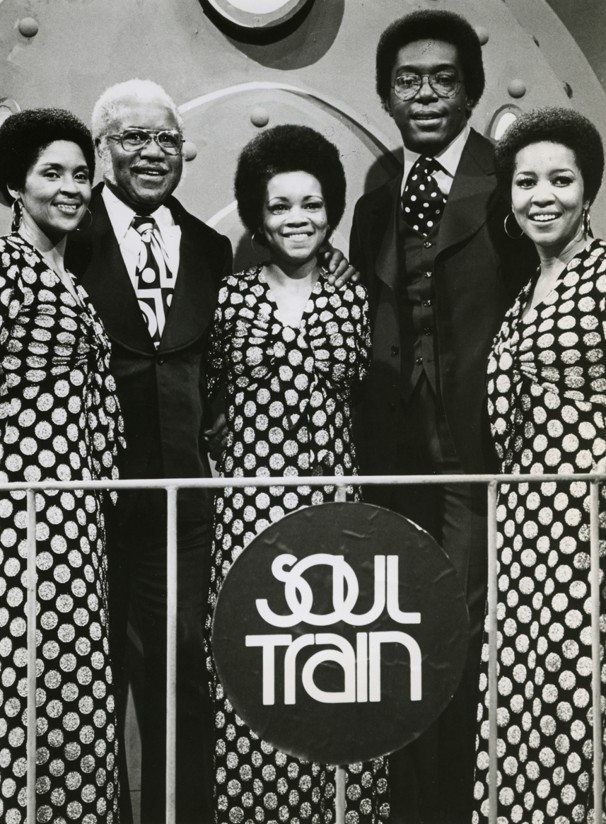
The Staple Singers

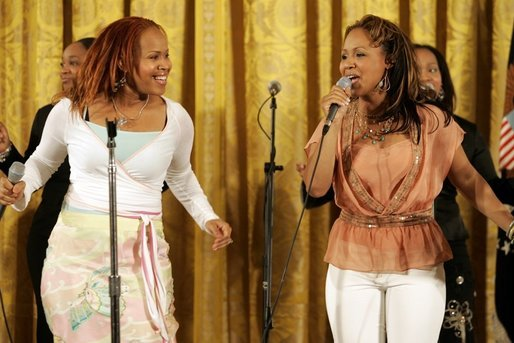
Mary Mary

=== Worldwide ===
| Title | Released | Artist | Total certified units (Note: Sales figures obtained from certifying bodies alone) | Claimed sales | Ref. |
|---|---|---|---|---|---|
| "Move On Up a Little Higher" | 1947 | Mahalia Jackson | —N/a | 8 million | |
| "Oh Happy Day" | 1968 | The Edwin Hawkins Singers | 1 million: US: 1 million | 7 million | |
| "He's Got the Whole World in His Hands" | 1957 | Laurie London with the Geoff Love Orchestra and Chorus | 1 million: US: 1 million | 3 million | |
| "When You Believe" | 1998 | Whitney Houston and Mariah Carey | 2.755 million: AUS: 35,000; BEL: 50,000; FRA: 250,000; GER: 250,000; NZ: 15,000; SWE: 30,000; SWI: 25,000; UK: 600,000; US: 1.5 million (Note: Combined physical sales of 500,000 and digital sales of 1 million.) | —N/a | |
| "Follow God" | 2019 | Kanye West | 2.505 million: DEN: 45,000; NZ: 30,000; POL: 25,000; POR: 5,000; UK: 400,000; US: 2 million | —N/a | |
| "Hurricane" | 2021 | Kanye West and the Weeknd featuring Lil Baby | 2.355 million: CAN: 80,000; DEN: 45,000; NZ: 30,000; UK: 200,000; US: 2 million | —N/a | |
| "I'll Take You There" | 1972 | The Staple Singers | 0.7 million: UK: 200,000; US: 500,000 | 2 million | |
| "Take Me to the King" | 2012 | Tamela Mann | 2 million: US: 2 million | —N/a | |
| "Shackles (Praise You)" | 2000 | Mary Mary | 1.91 million: AUS: 70,000; BEL: 25,000; DEN: 45,000; FRA: 125,000; NZ: 5,000; SWE: 15,000; UK: 600,000; US: 1 million | —N/a | |
| "Blinded by Your Grace, Pt. 2" | 2017 | Stormzy featuring MNEK | 1.215 million: NZ: 15,000; UK: 1.2 million | —N/a | |
| "I Smile" | 2011 | Kirk Franklin | 1.015 million: NZ: 15,000; US: 1 million | —N/a | |

=== Australia ===
The songs listed below have crossed the current sales thresholds — 35,000 (Gold) and 70,000 (Platinum) — to be certified by the Australian Recording Industry Association (ARIA).

| Title | Released | Artist(s) | Certification | Ref. |
|---|---|---|---|---|
| "Shackles (Praise You)" | 2000 | Mary Mary | Platinum | |
| "When You Believe" | 1998 | Whitney Houston and Mariah Carey | Gold | |

=== New Zealand ===
| Title | Released | Artist(s) | Certification | Ref. |
|---|---|---|---|---|
| "Shackles (Praise You)" | 2000 | Mary Mary | Platinum | |
| "Follow God" | 2019 | Kanye West | Platinum | |
| "Hurricane" | 2021 | Kanye West and the Weeknd featuring Lil Baby | Platinum | |
| "I'll Take You There" | 1972 | The Staple Singers | Gold | |
| "When You Believe" | 1998 | Mariah Carey and Whitney Houston | Gold | |
| "I Believe I Can Fly" | 2001 | Yolanda Adams | Gold | |
| "I Smile" | 2011 | Kirk Franklin | Gold | |
| "Blinded by Your Grace, Pt. 2" | 2017 | Stormzy featuring MNEK | Gold | |

=== United Kingdom ===
List of best-selling gospel songs which are uncertified in the United Kingdom.

| Title | Released | Artist | Known sales | Ref. |
|---|---|---|---|---|
| "He's Got the Whole World in His Hands" | 1957 | Laurie London with the Geoff Love Orchestra and Chorus | 300,000 | |
| "Oh Happy Day" | 1968 | The Edwin Hawkins Singers | 250,000 | |

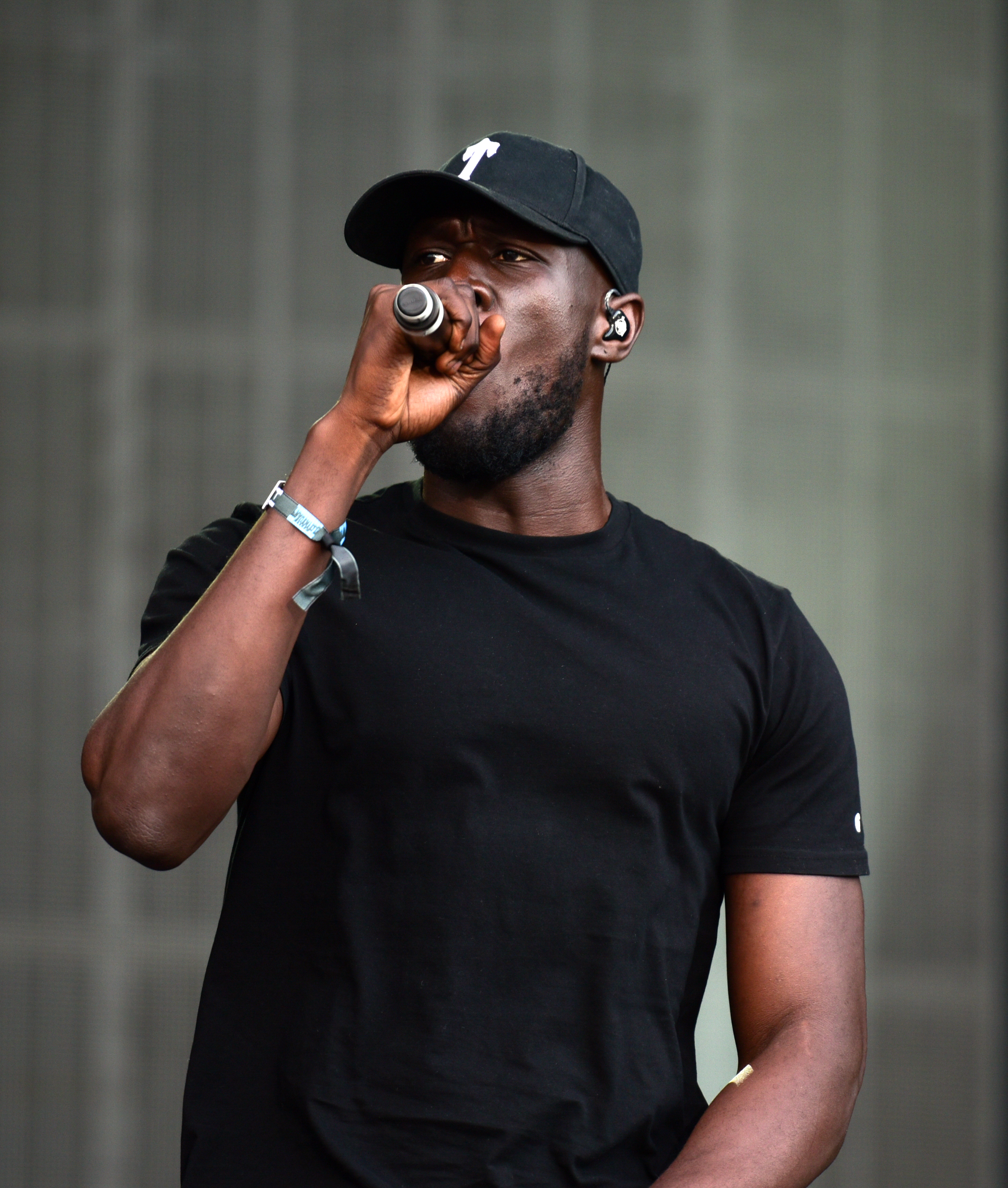
Stormzy

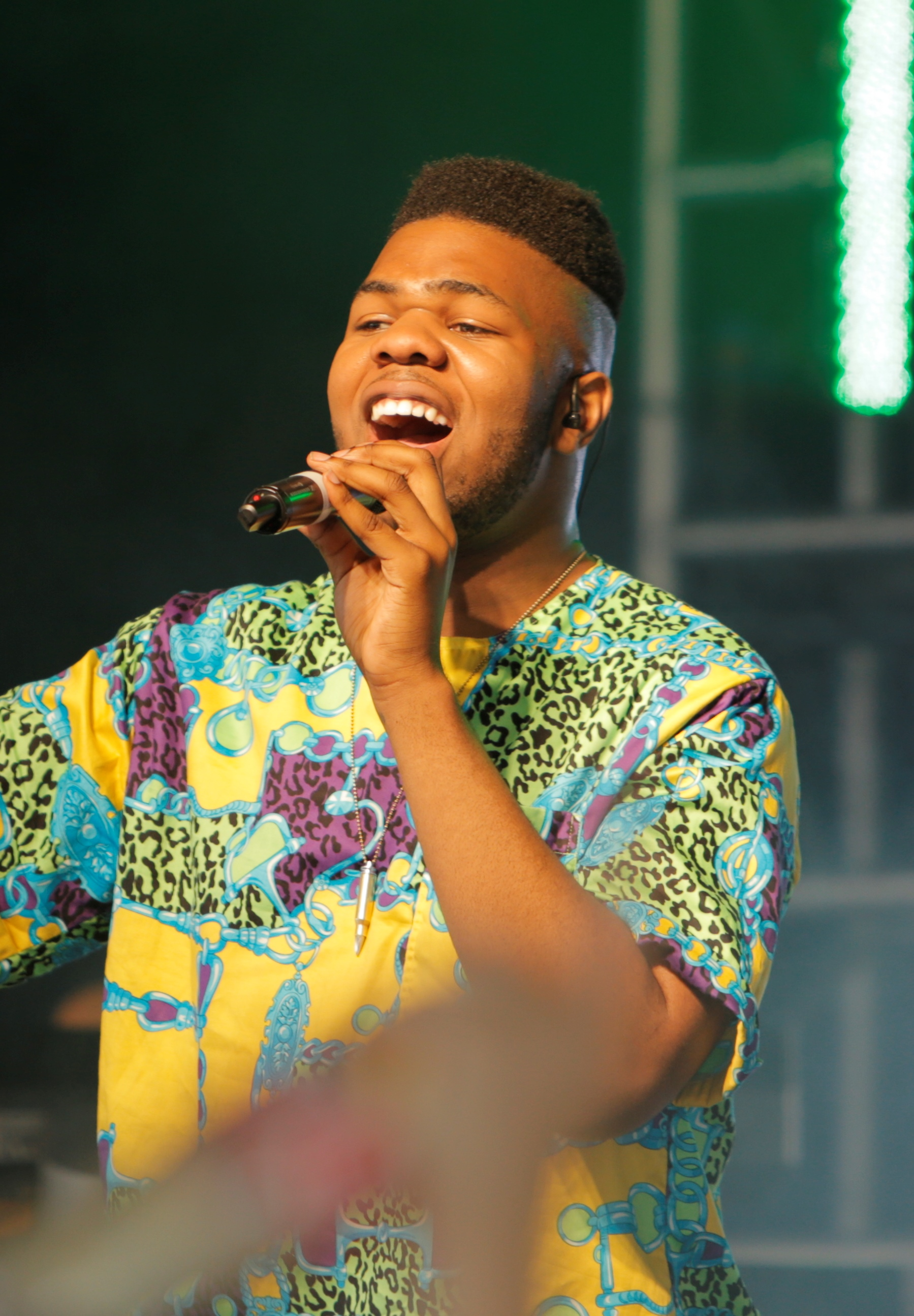
MNEK

The songs listed below have crossed the sales thresholds — 200,000 (Silver), 400,000 (Gold), 600,000 (Platinum) — to be certified by the British Phonographic Industry (BPI).

| Title | Released | Artist(s) | Certification | Ref. |
|---|---|---|---|---|
| "Blinded by Your Grace, Pt. 2" | 2017 | Stormzy featuring MNEK | 2× Platinum | |
| "When You Believe" | 1998 | Mariah Carey and Whitney Houston | Platinum | |
| "Shackles (Praise You)" | 2000 | Mary Mary | Platinum | |
| "I'll Take You There" | 1972 | The Staple Singers | Silver | |
| "I Am Blessed" | 1995 | Eternal | Silver | |
| "Follow God" | 2019 | Kanye West | Silver | |
| "Hurricane" | 2021 | Kanye West and the Weeknd featuring Lil Baby | Silver | |

=== United States ===
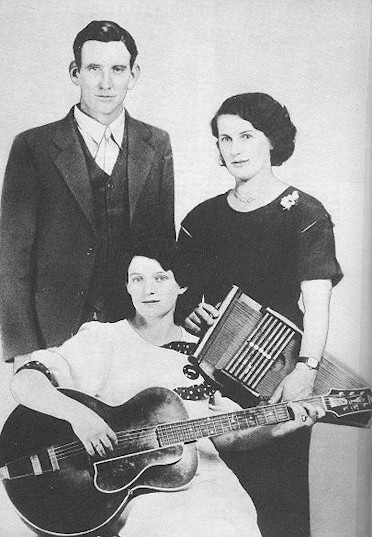
The Carter Family

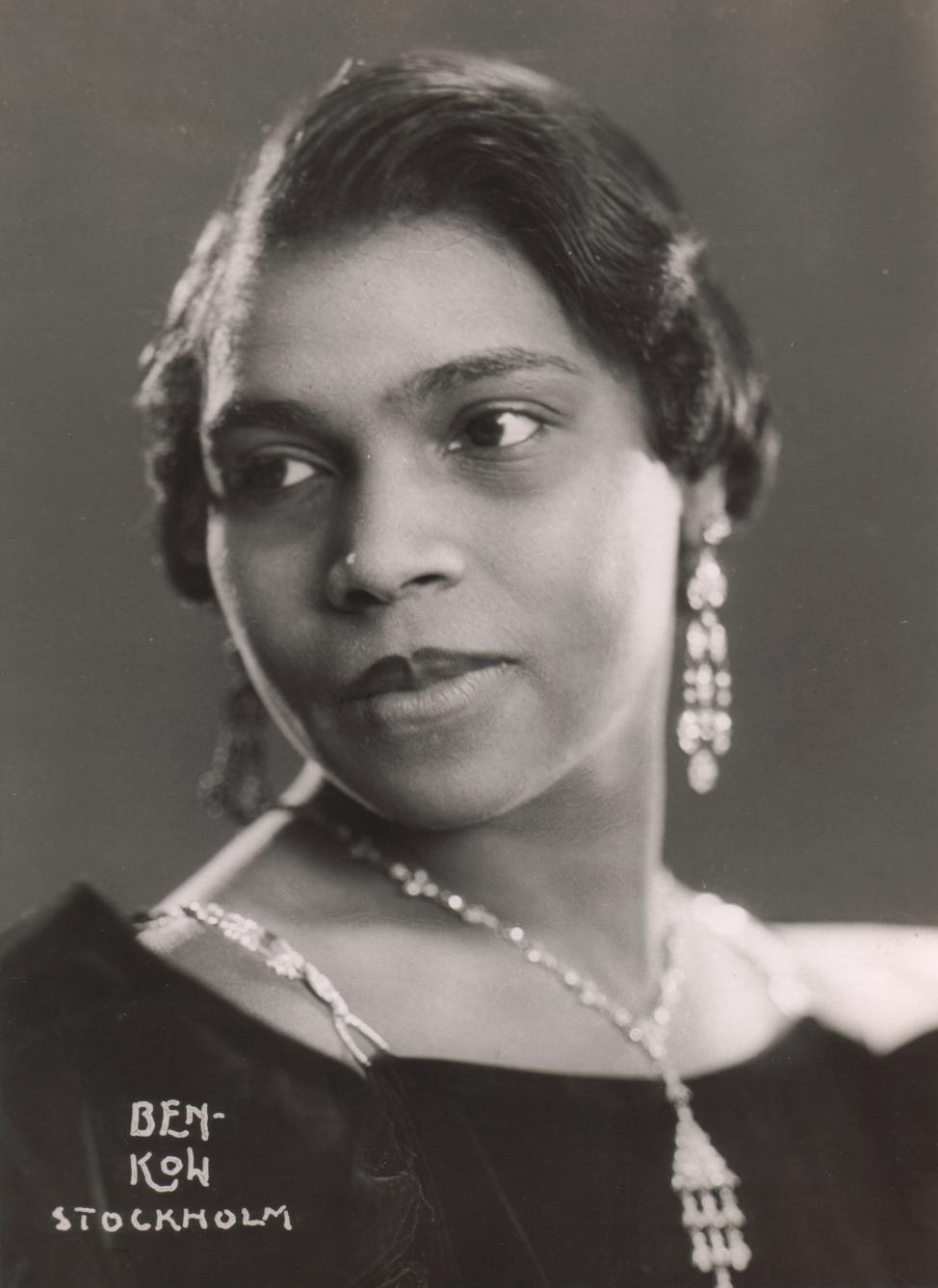
Marian Anderson

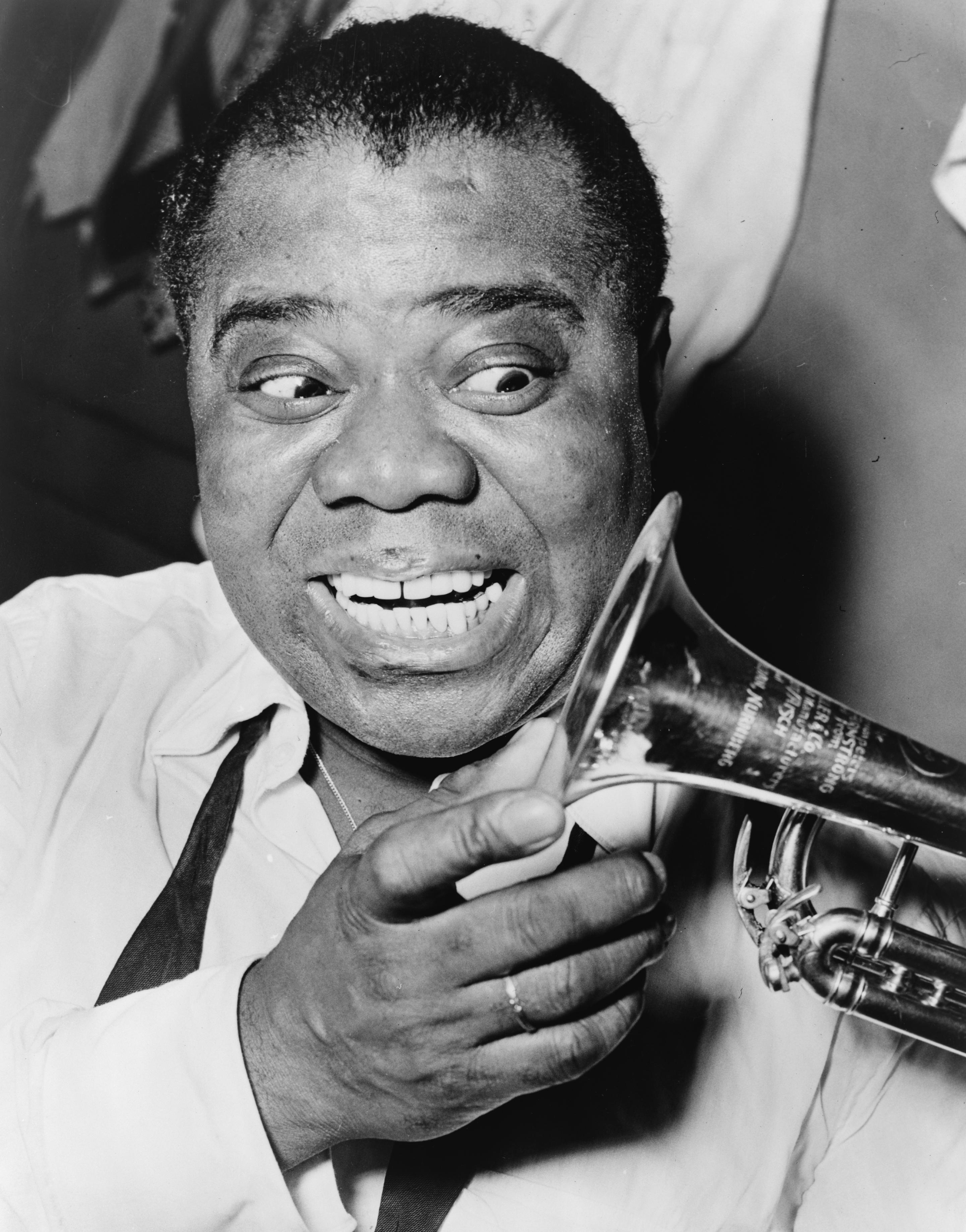
Louis Armstrong

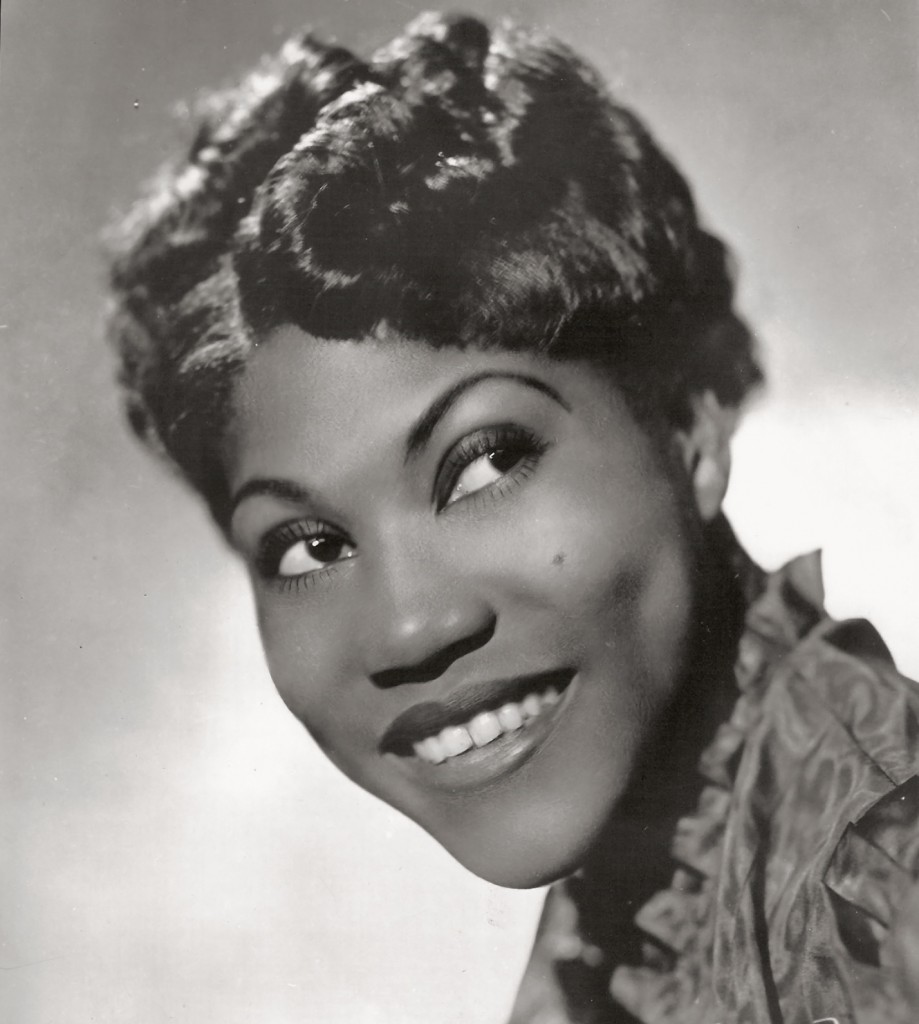
Sister Rosetta Tharpe

List of gospel songs which have reported sales of 1 million units or higher but are uncertified by the Recording Industry Association of America (RIAA). Though "I'll Take You There" by The Staple Singers was certified Gold on January 31, 2019, for digital sales of 500,000 units, its physical sales of 1.5 million units, reported on May 6, 1972, are uncertified by the RIAA.

| Title | Released | Artist | Claimed sales | Ref. |
|---|---|---|---|---|
| "I'll Take You There" | 1972 | The Staple Singers | 1.5 million | |
| "Swing Low, Sweet Chariot" | 1909 | Fisk University Jubilee Quartet | 1 million | |
| "Can the Circle Be Unbroken (Bye and Bye)" | 1935 | The Carter Family | 1 million | |
| "Ave Maria" | 1937 | Marian Anderson | 1 million | |
| "When the Saints Go Marching In" | 1938 | Louis Armstrong | 1 million | |
| "Strange Things Happening Every Day" | 1945 | Sister Rosetta Tharpe | 1 million | |
| "Don't Let Nobody Turn You Around" | 1947 | Fairfield Four | 1 million | |
| "Even Me" | 1948 | Mahalia Jackson | 1 million | |
| "I'll Fly Away" | 1948 | The Chuck Wagon Gang | 1 million | |
| "Just Over the Hill" | 1950 | Mahalia Jackson | 1 million | |
| "Surely God Is Able" | 1950 | The Famous Ward Singers | 1 million | |
| "How I Got Over" | 1951 | Clara Ward | 1 million | |
| "Uncloudy Day" | 1956 | The Staple Singers | 1 million | |
| "Packing Up" | 1957 | The Famous Ward Singers | 1 million | |
| "Lord, Don't Move That Mountain" | 1973 | Inez Andrews | 1 million | |

List of gospel songs which have certified sales of 1 million units or higher. From 1958 to 1988, the sales thresholds for a certification from the Recording Industry Association of America (RIAA) were 1 million units (Gold) and 2 million units (Platinum). The songs listed below were certified prior to 1989.

| Title | Released | Artist(s) | Certification | Ref. |
|---|---|---|---|---|
| "He's Got the Whole World in His Hands" | 1957 | Laurie London with the Geoff Love Orchestra and Chorus | Gold | |
| "Oh Happy Day" | 1969 | The Edwin Hawkins Singers | Gold | |
| "Put Your Hand in the Hand" | 1971 | Ocean | Gold | |
| "If You're Ready (Come Go with Me)" | 1973 | The Staple Singers | Gold | |

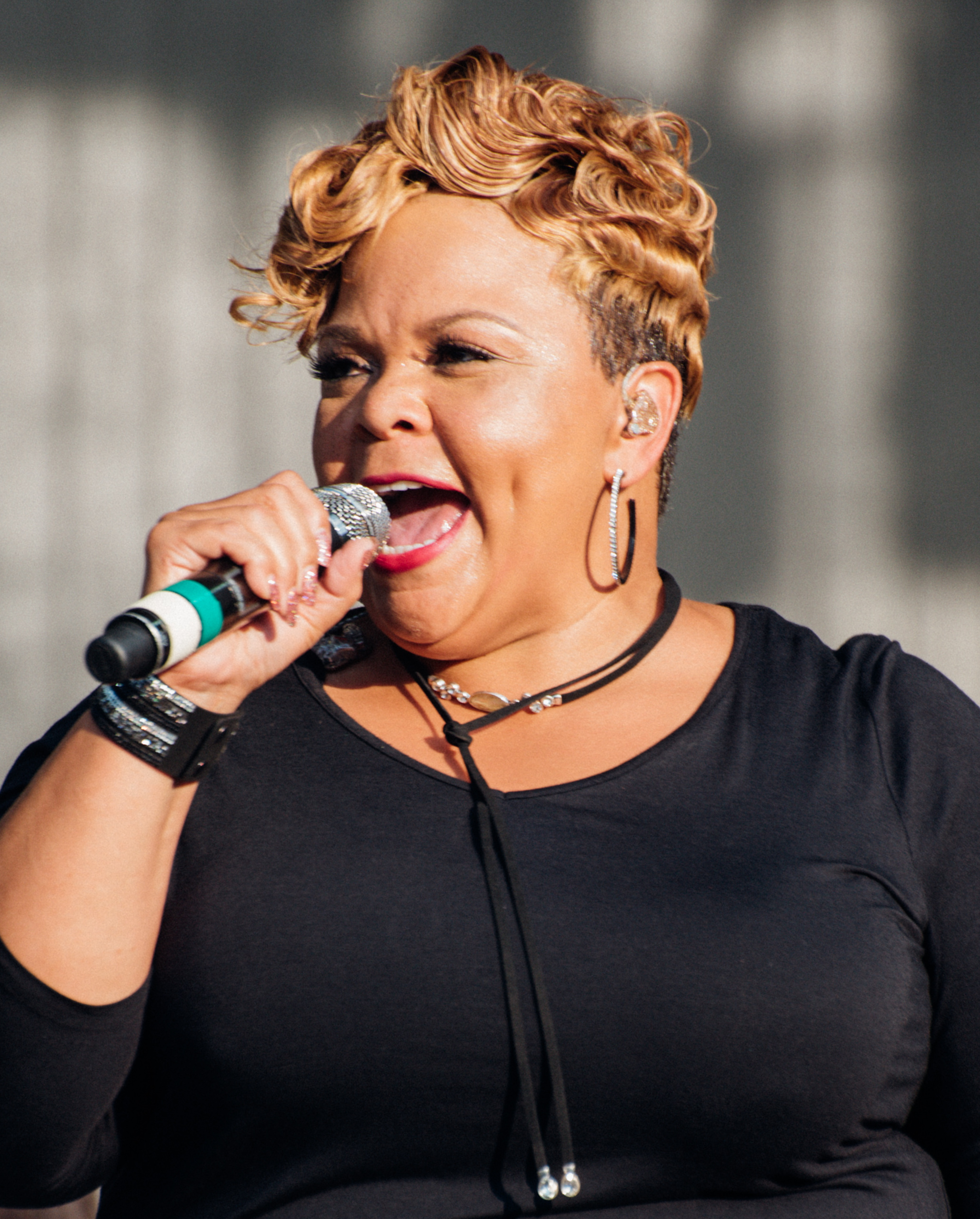
Tamela Mann

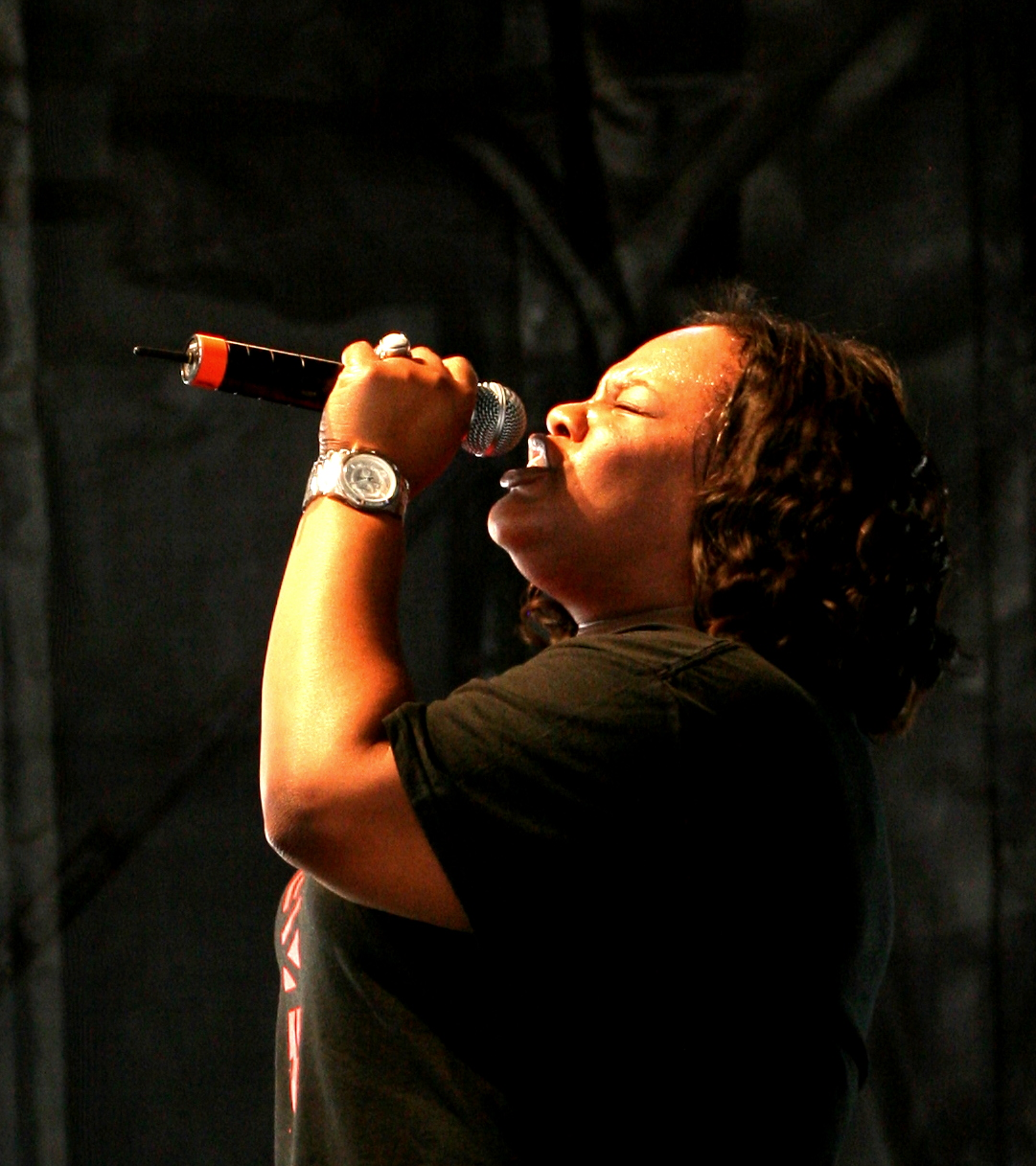
Tasha Cobbs

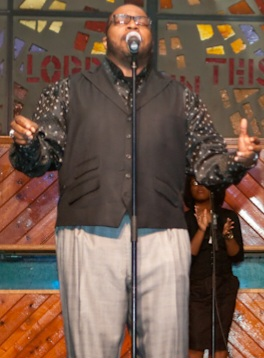
Marvin Sapp

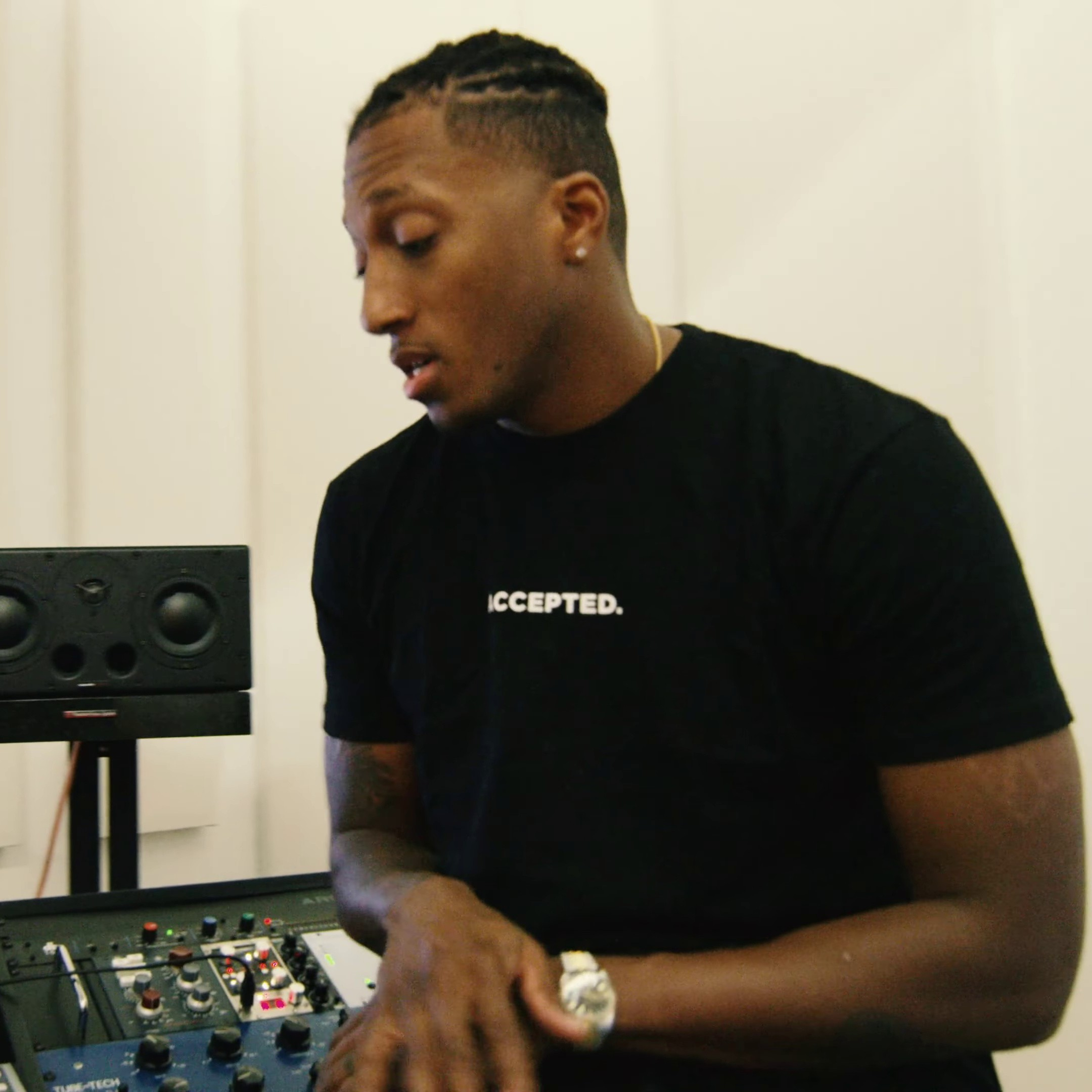
Lecrae

The songs listed below have crossed the current 1 million unit threshold to be certified Platinum by the Recording Industry Association of America (RIAA).

| Title | Released | Artist(s) | Certification | Ref. |
|---|---|---|---|---|
| "Take Me to the King" | 2012 | Tamela Mann | 2× Platinum | |
| "Follow God" | 2019 | Kanye West | 2× Platinum | |
| "Hurricane" | 2021 | Kanye West, the Weeknd featuring Lil Baby | 2× Platinum | |
| "When You Believe" | 1998 | Mariah Carey and Whitney Houston | Platinum | |
| "Shackles (Praise You)" | 2000 | Mary Mary | Platinum | |
| "Grateful" | 2005 | Hezekiah Walker & LFC | Platinum | |
| "Never Would Have Made It" | 2007 | Marvin Sapp | Platinum | |
| "I Look to You" | 2009 | Whitney Houston | Platinum | |
| "God Favored Me" (Extended Version) | 2009 | Hezekiah Walker & LFC featuring Marvin Sapp & D.J. Rogers | Platinum | |
| "The Best in Me" | 2010 | Marvin Sapp | Platinum | |
| "I Smile" | 2011 | Kirk Franklin | Platinum | |
| "Break Every Chain" | 2014 | Tasha Cobbs Leonard | Platinum | |
| "Every Praise" | 2015 | Hezekiah Walker | Platinum | |
| "Worth" | 2015 | Anthony Brown & group therAPy | Platinum | |
| "I'll Find You" | 2017 | Lecrae, Tori Kelly | Platinum | |
| "Your Spirit" | 2017 | Tasha Cobbs Leonard, Kierra Sheard | Platinum | |
| "Won't He Do It" | 2017 | Koryn Hawthorne | Platinum | |
| "Coming In Hot" | 2018 | Lecrae, Andy Mineo | Platinum | |
| "You Know My Name" | 2018 | Tasha Cobbs Leonard | Platinum | |
| "Jireh" | 2022 | Elevation Worship, Maverick City Music, Chandler Moore, Naomi Raine | Platinum | |

== Best-selling gospel albums ==
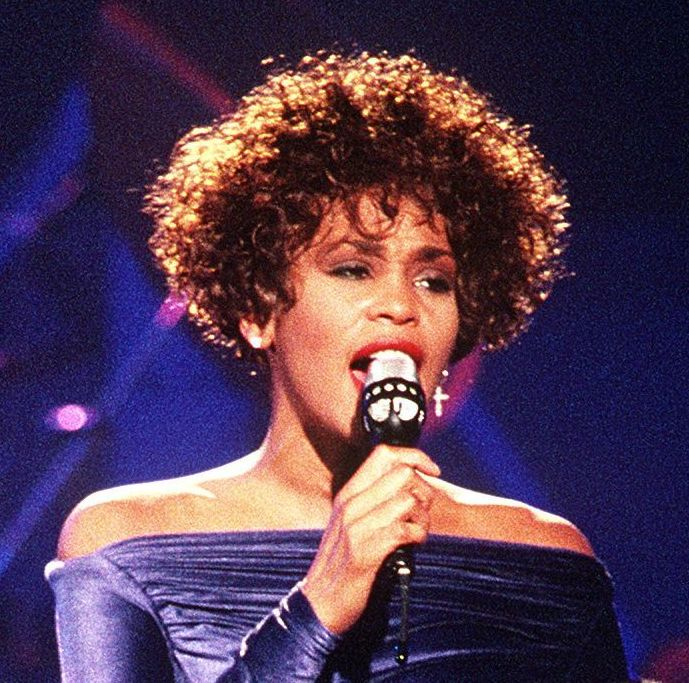
Whitney Houston's The Preacher's Wife (1996) is the best-selling gospel album of all time.

=== Worldwide ===
| Title | Released | Artist | Sales |
|---|---|---|---|
| The Preacher's Wife | 1996 | Whitney Houston | 6 million |

=== Canada ===
| Title | Released | Artist | Certification | Known sales |
|---|---|---|---|---|
| The Preacher's Wife | 1997 | Whitney Houston | Platinum | —N/a |
| Donda | 2021 | Kanye West | Platinum | —N/a |

=== Japan ===
| Title | Released | Artist | Certification | Known sales |
|---|---|---|---|---|
| The Preacher's Wife | 1997 | Whitney Houston | 2x Platinum | —N/a |
| Best of Take 6 | 1995 | Take 6 | Platinum | 200,000 |
| Join the Band | 1994 | Take 6 | Gold | 100,000 |
| Brothers | 1996 | Take 6 | Gold | 100,000 |

=== United Kingdom ===
List of gospel albums which have crossed the sales thresholds — 60,000 (Silver), 100,000 (Gold), 300,000 (Platinum) — for certification by the British Phonographic Industry (BPI).

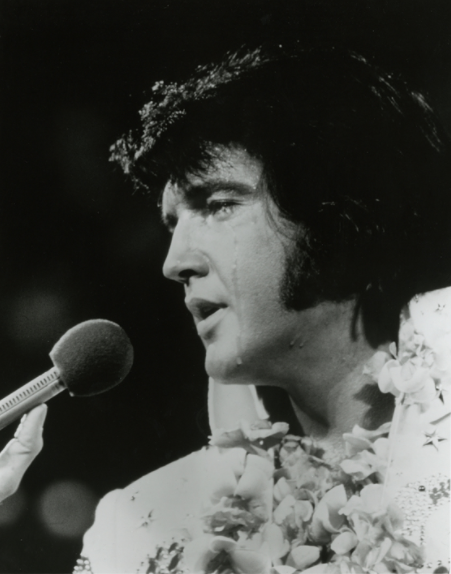
Elvis Presley

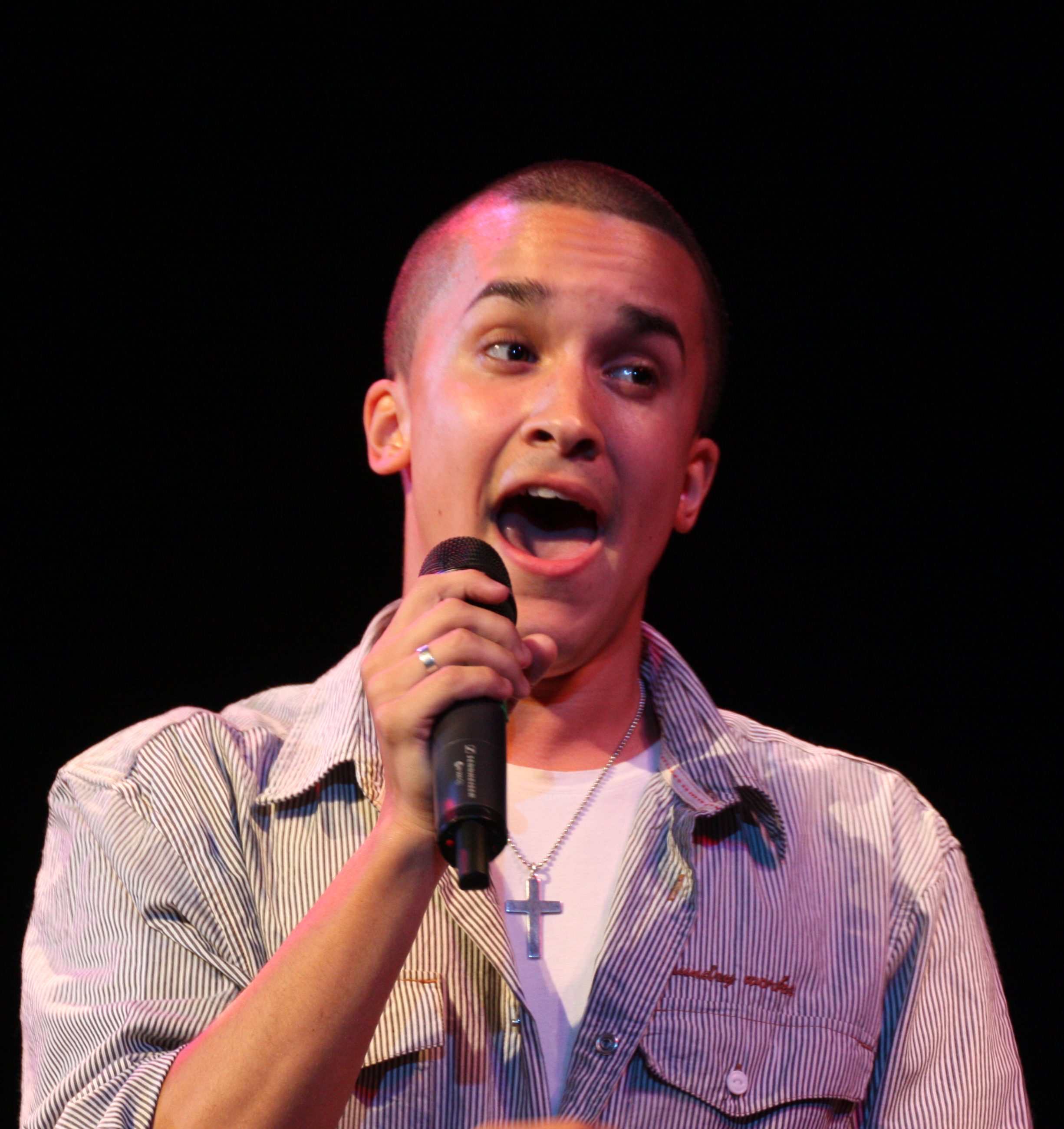
Jahméne Douglas

| Title | Released | Artist | Certification | Known sales |
|---|---|---|---|---|
| Donda | 2021 | Kanye West | Gold | —N/a |
| Come Together: A Musical Experience in Love | 1973 | Jimmy and Carol Owens featuring Pat Boone | —N/a | 75,000 |
| The Preacher's Wife | 1997 | Whitney Houston | Silver | —N/a |
| Gospel Favourites | 1999 | Elvis Presley | Silver | —N/a |
| Thankful | 2000 | Mary Mary | Silver | —N/a |
| Love Never Fails | 2013 | Jahméne Douglas | Silver | 61,826 |
| Jesus Is King | 2020 | Kanye West | Silver | —N/a |

=== United States ===
List of gospel albums which have reported sales of 1 million units or higher but are uncertified by the Recording Industry Association of America (RIAA).

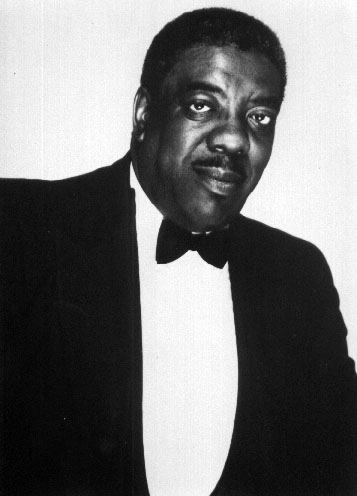
James Cleveland

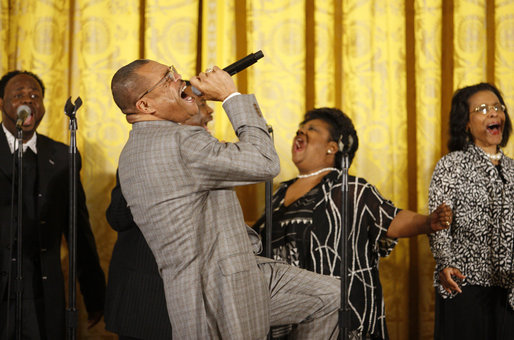
Walter Hawkins

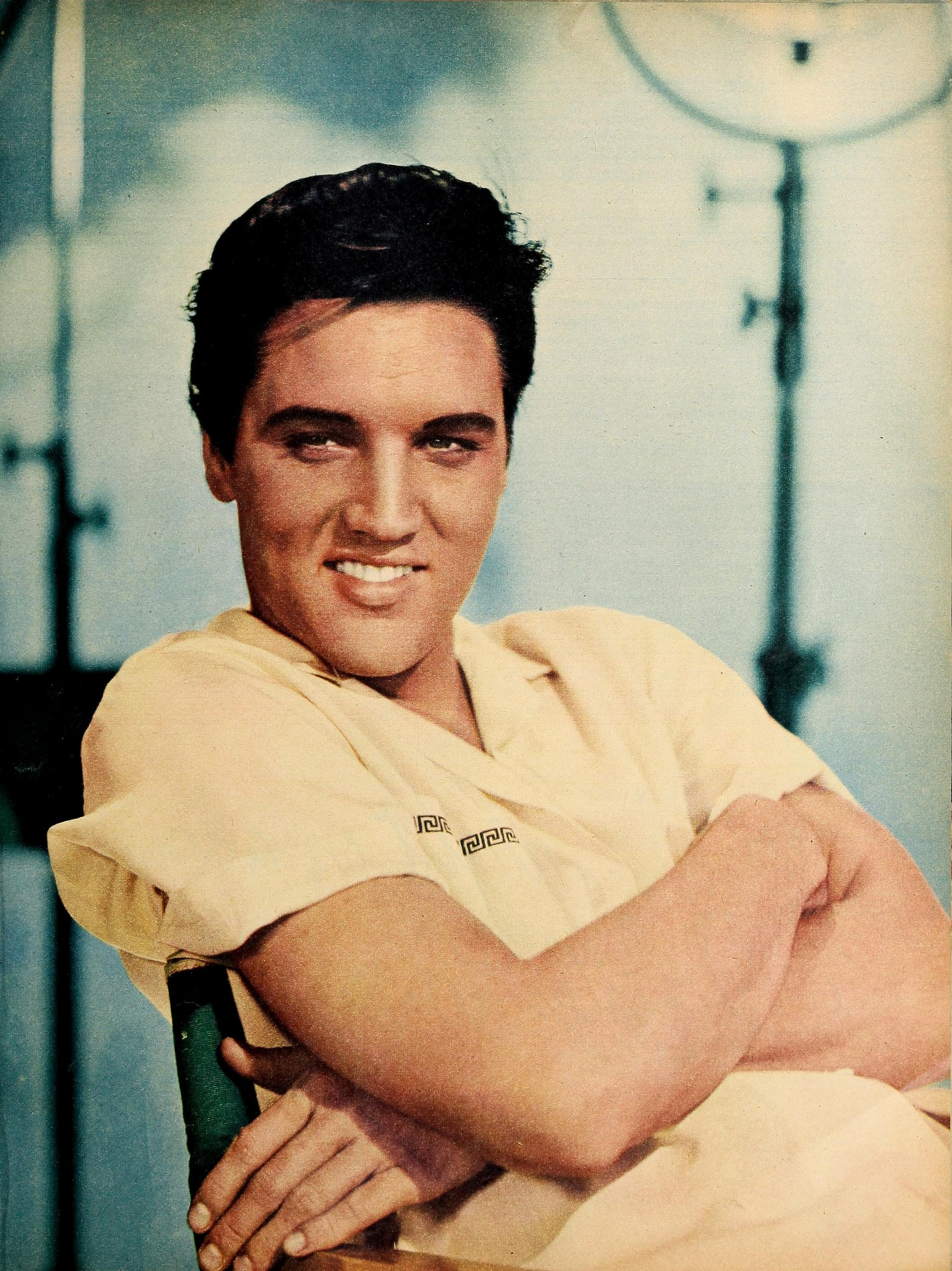
Elvis Presley

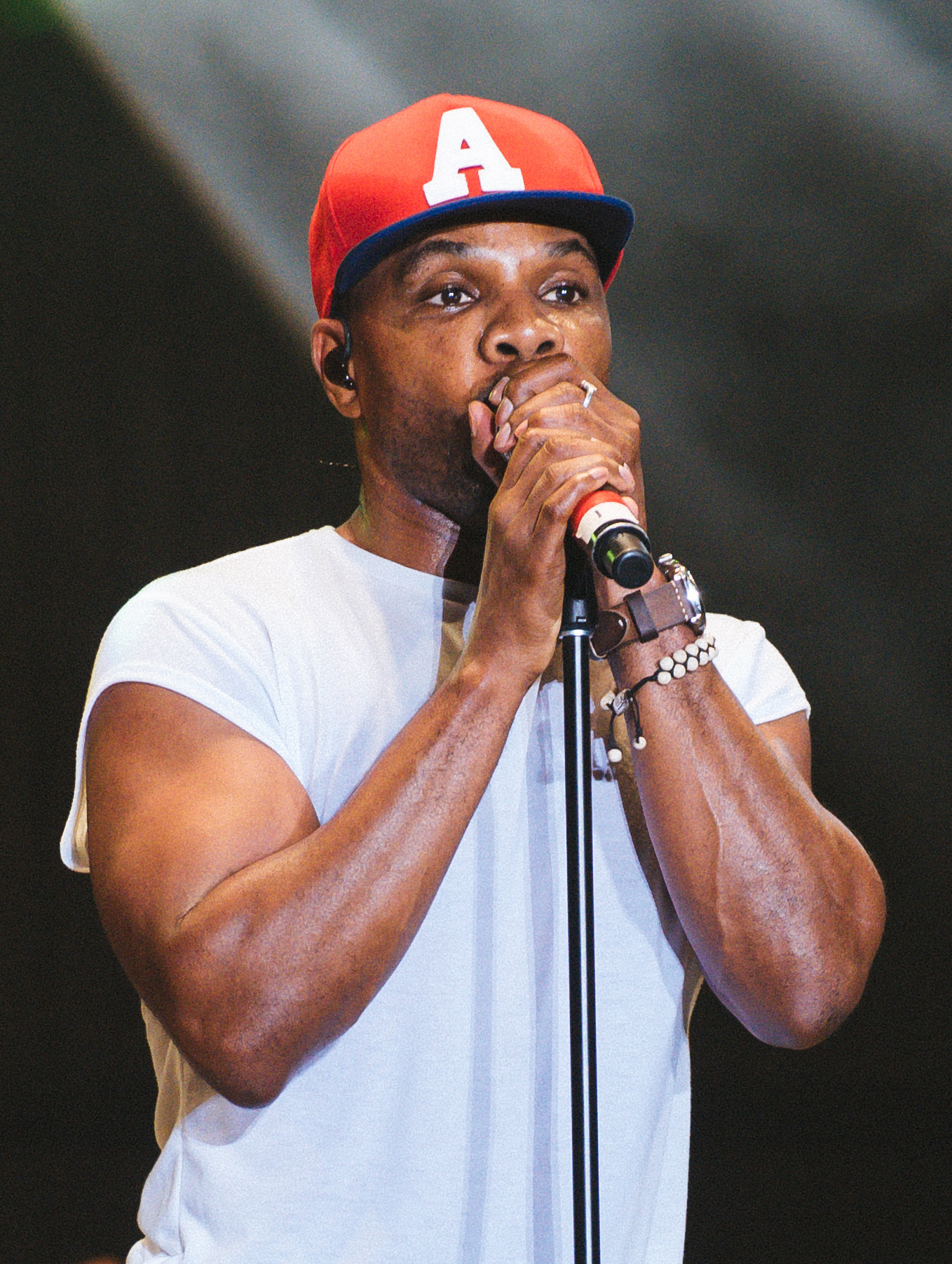
Kirk Franklin

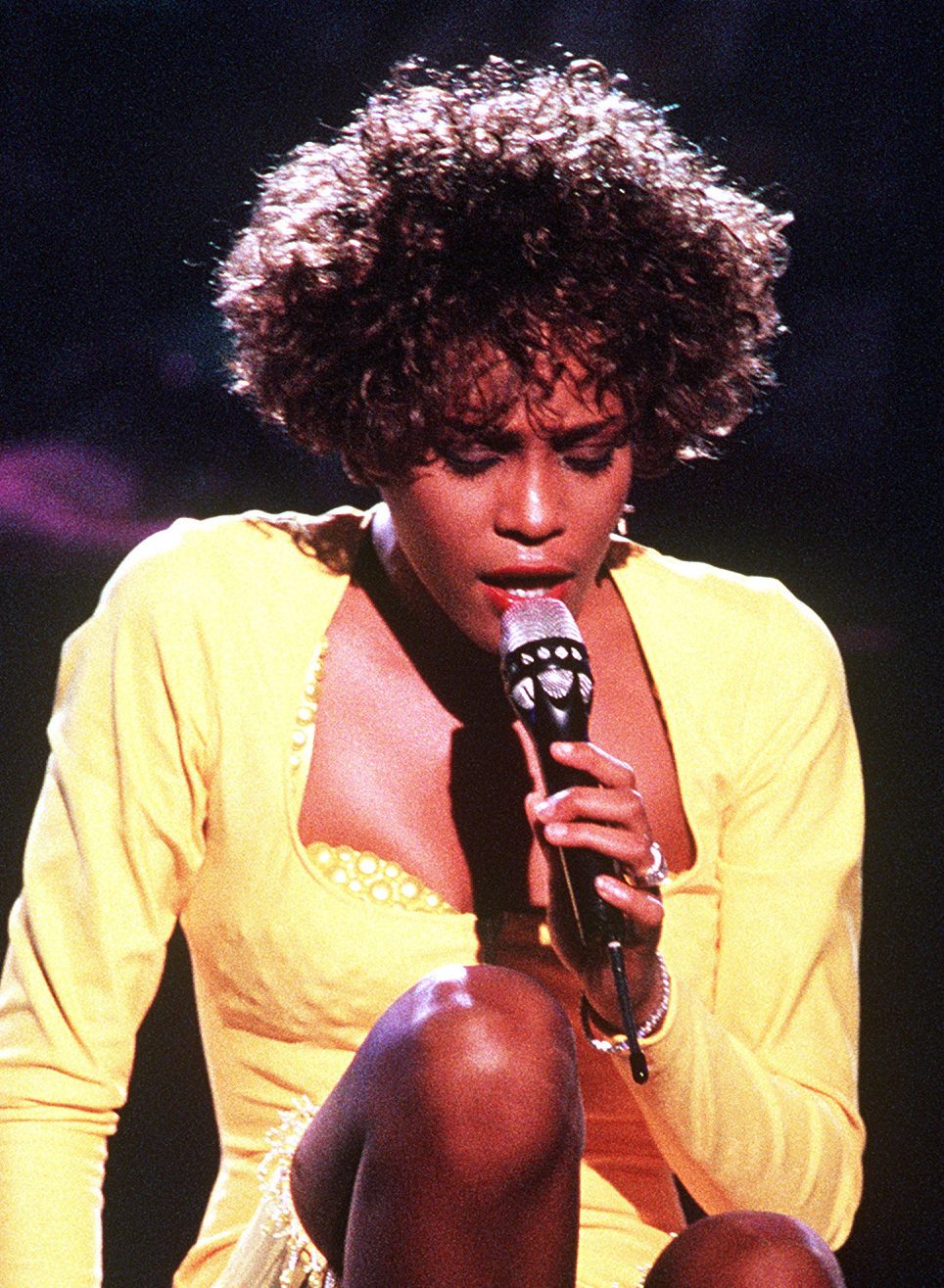
Whitney Houston

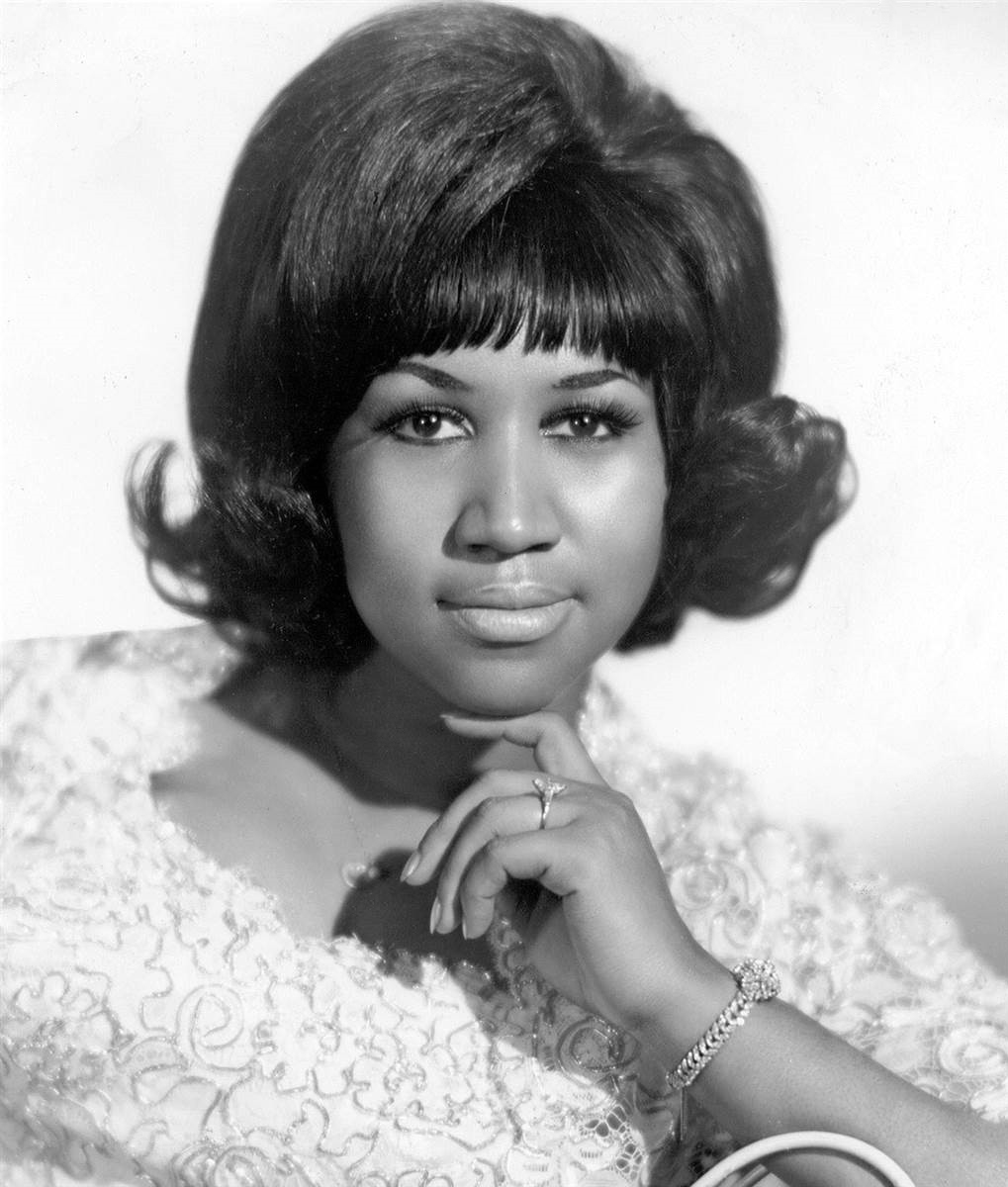
Aretha Franklin

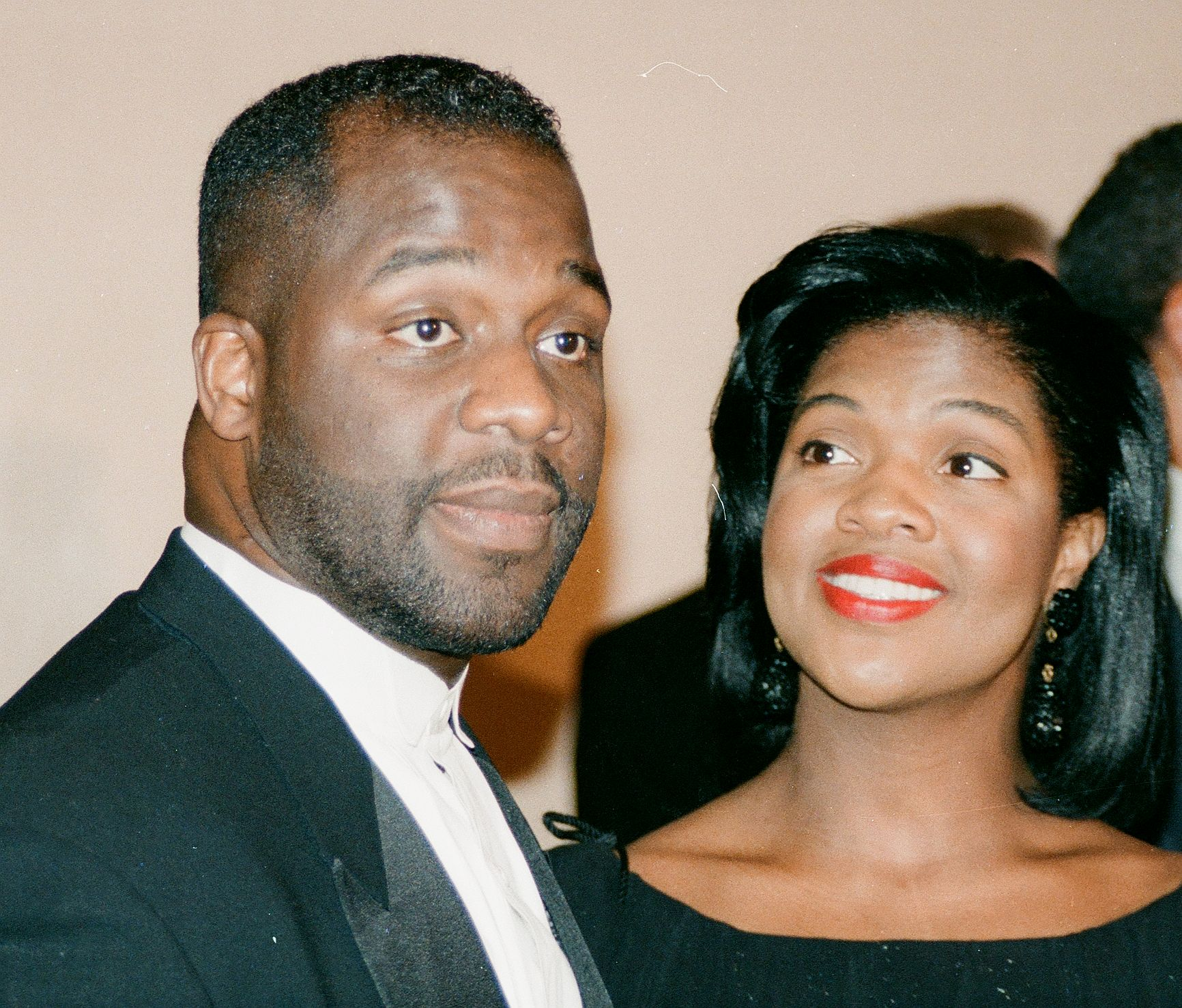
BeBe & CeCe Winans

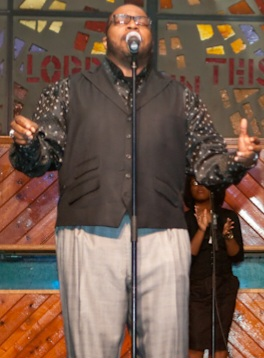
Marvin Sapp

| Title | Released | Artist | Known sales | Ref. |
|---|---|---|---|---|
| Peace Be Still | 1963 | James Cleveland | 1 million | |
| Let Us Go into the House of the Lord | 1968 | The Edwin Hawkins Singers | 1 million | |
| Love Alive III | 1984 | Walter Hawkins | 1 million | |
| Broken | 1995 | William Becton | 1 million | |

List of gospel albums which have a Platinum certification from the Recording Industry Association of America (RIAA).

| Title | Released | Artist | Certification | Known sales |
|---|---|---|---|---|
| How Great Thou Art | 1967 | Elvis Presley | 3× Platinum | —N/a |
| God's Property from Kirk Franklin's Nu Nation | 1997 | Kirk Franklin | 3× Platinum | 3,000,000 |
| The Preacher's Wife | 1996 | Whitney Houston | 3× Platinum | 2,471,000 |
| The Nu Nation Project | 1998 | Kirk Franklin | 2× Platinum | 3,000,000 |
| Amazing Grace | 1972 | Aretha Franklin | 2× Platinum | —N/a |
| Pages of Life - Chapters I & II | 1998 | Fred Hammond | 2× Platinum | —N/a |
| Thankful | 2000 | Mary Mary | 2× Platinum | 1,239,000 |
| Kirk Franklin & the Family | 1993 | Kirk Franklin & the Family | Platinum | 2,000,000 |
| Whatcha Lookin' 4 | 1996 | Kirk Franklin & the Family | Platinum | 2,000,000 |
| Mountain High...Valley Low | 1999 | Yolanda Adams | Platinum | 1,374,000 |
| Live in London and More... | 2000 | Donnie McClurkin | Platinum | 1,300,000 |
| Peace in the Valley | 1957 | Elvis Presley | Platinum | —N/a |
| His Hand in Mine | 1960 | Elvis Presley | Platinum | —N/a |
| He Touched Me | 1972 | Elvis Presley | Platinum | —N/a |
| Take 6 | 1988 | Take 6 | Platinum | —N/a |
| Different Lifestyles | 1991 | BeBe & CeCe Winans | Platinum | —N/a |
| Alone in His Presence | 1995 | CeCe Winans | Platinum | —N/a |
| The Rebirth of Kirk Franklin | 2002 | Kirk Franklin | Platinum | —N/a |
| Elvis: Ultimate Gospel | 2004 | Elvis Presley | Platinum | —N/a |
| Psalms, Hymns and Spiritual Songs | 2005 | Donnie McClurkin | Platinum | —N/a |
| Hero | 2005 | Kirk Franklin | Platinum | —N/a |
| Thirsty | 2007 | Marvin Sapp | Platinum | 712,000 |
| Donda | 2021 | Kanye West | Platinum | —N/a |

List of gospel compilation albums featuring various artists, which have a Platinum certification from the Recording Industry Association of America (RIAA).

| Title | Released | Certification | Known sales |
|---|---|---|---|
| WOW Gospel 1998 | 1998 | Platinum | —N/a |
| WOW Gospel 1999 | 1999 | Platinum | —N/a |
| WOW Gospel 2000 | 2000 | Platinum | —N/a |
| WOW Gospel 2001 | 2001 | Platinum | —N/a |
| WOW Gospel 2003 | 2003 | Platinum | —N/a |
| WOW Gospel 2004 | 2004 | Platinum | —N/a |
| WOW Gospel 2005 | 2005 | Platinum | —N/a |

List of gospel albums ranked in order of their highest single-week sales.

| Title | Date | Artist | Best week sales |
|---|---|---|---|
| The Preacher's Wife | January 4, 1997 | Whitney Houston | 330,000 |
| Donda | September 2, 2021 | Kanye West | 309,000 |
| Jesus Is King | October 31, 2019 | Kanye West | 264,000 |
| God's Property from Kirk Franklin's Nu Nation | June 14, 1997 | Kirk Franklin | 120,000 |
| The Nu Nation Project | Octobter 17, 1998 | Kirk Franklin | 105,000 |
| I Need an Angel | December 11, 2004 | Ruben Studdard | 96,000 |
| The Rebirth of Kirk Franklin | March 9, 2002 | Kirk Franklin | 91,000 |
| Hello Fear | April 2, 2011 | Kirk Franklin | 87,000 |
| The Prince of Egypt: Inspirational | January 9, 1999 | Various | 76,000 |
| Here I Am | April 3, 2010 | Marvin Sapp | 76,000 |
| The Fight of My Life | January 5, 2008 | Kirk Franklin | 74,000 |
| Believe | January 5, 2002 | Yolanda Adams | 67,000 |
| Hero | October 22, 2005 | Kirk Franklin | 66,000 |
| Mary Mary | July 28, 2005 | Mary Mary | 57,000 |
| Psalms, Hymns and Spiritual Songs | April 15, 2005 | Donnie McClurkin | 53,132 |
| Incredible | July 21, 2002 | Mary Mary | 43,000 |
| Something Big | April 3, 2011 | Mary Mary | 42,000 |
| Whatcha Lookin' 4 | May 25, 1996 | Kirk Franklin | 36,000 |
| Losing My Religion | December 5, 2015 | Kirk Franklin | 35,000 |
| Day by Day | September 9, 2005 | Yolanda Adams | 29,316 |
| Somethin' 'Bout Love | June 18, 2004 | Fred Hammond | 26,257 |
| Again | March 14, 2003 | Donnie McClurkin | 25,043 |
| Day by Day | September 16, 2005 | Yolanda Adams | 23,820 |
| Help | March 30, 2014 | Erica Campbell | 23,000 |
| Long, Live, Love | June 13, 2019 | Kirk Franklin | 20,000 |
| Go Get It | May 17, 2012 | Mary Mary | 18,946 |
| Heart to Yours | April 24, 2002 | Michelle Williams | 17,000 |
| Best Days | August 20, 2012 | Tamela Mann | 16,670 |
| Hiding Place | September 29, 2018 | Tori Kelly | 15,000 |
| Heart. Passion. Pursuit. | September, 2017 | Tasha Cobbs Leonard | 13,000 |
| Jesus at the Center: Live | August 20, 2012 | Israel & New Breed | 12,333 |
| This Is Me | July 15, 2006 | Kierra Sheard | 11,000 |
| One Way | October 1, 2016 | Tamela Mann | 10,000 |

== See also ==
- List of best-selling music artists
- List of best-selling Christian songs and albums in the United States
