= WOW Gospel 1998 =

Compilation album by Various artists
- Released: January 27, 1998
- Genre: Gospel music, CCM
- Label: Sparrow

WOW Gospel compilation albums chronology
WOW Gospel 1998 (1998)	WOW Gospel 1999 (1999)

Professional ratings
Review scores
Source	Rating
Allmusic	4.5/5 stars

WOW Gospel 1998 is a gospel music compilation album in the WOW series. It was released on January 27, 1998, and is the first WOW album to feature and focus on contemporary gospel in the wake of its growing popularity at the time, thus setting high standard for future releases. It reached chart position 100 on the Billboard 200, and second place on the Billboard Top Gospel Albums chart.

The album was certified as platinum in the US in 1999 by the Recording Industry Association of America (RIAA).

== Track listing ==
=== Disc One ===
1. Stomp – God's Property - 5:36
2. No Weapon [Remix] – Fred Hammond & Radical for Christ - 4:44
3. Jesus Is My Help – Hezekiah Walker & the Love Fellowship Crusade Choir - 4:46
4. Speak to My Heart – Donnie McClurkin - 5:19
5. Every Time – CeCe Winans - 4:07
6. Stranger [Remix] – Donald Lawrence - 4:27
7. The Call – Anointed - 4:05
8. Be Encouraged – William Becton - 5:11
9. Crucified with Christ – Commissioned - 3:34
10. Greatest Part of Me – Virtue! - 3:40
11. You Don't Have to Be Afraid – Take 6 - 4:05
12. Shout – Rev. Milton Brunson & The Thompson Community Singers - 5:26
13. Holy Is the Lamb – Oleta Adams - 4:39
14. God Cares – Sounds of Blackness - 6:00
15. Stir Up '98 – Colorado Mass Choir, Joe Pace - 5:39

=== Disc Two ===
1. Stand! – Victory in Praise Music & Arts Seminar Mass Choir - 4:06
2. I've Got a Testimony – Rev. Clay Evans & The AARC Mass Choir - 5:03
3. Glad I've Got Jesus – The Canton Spirituals - 3:51
4. Total Praise – Richard Smallwood & Vision - 3:19
5. Beyond the Veil – Daryl Coley - 6:33
6. Gotta Feelin' – O'landa Draper & the Associates - 3:21
7. Thank You Lord (He Did It All) – John P. Kee and New Life Community Choir - 5:09
8. Mother Sherman Story (We'll Understand It Better By and By) – Carlton Pearson - 6:04
9. Heaven – Shirley Caesar - 4:14
10. Jesus Paid It All – Mississippi Mass Choir, Rev. James Moore - 6:34
11. He's an on Time God – Dottie Peoples - 4:53
12. Not the Time, Not the Place – Marvin Sapp - 4:00
13. Helen's Testimony – Helen Baylor - 7:29
14. Battle Is the Lord's – Yolanda Adams - 4:39
15. Order My Steps – GMWA Women of Worship - 4:45

== Certifications ==
Region	Certification	Certified units/sales
United States (RIAA)	Platinum	1,000,000^{^}
^{^} Shipments figures based on certification alone.
