= WOW Gospel 2000 =

Compilation album by Various artists
- Released: February 8, 2000
- Genre: CCM, Gospel

Various artists chronology
WOW Gospel 1999 (1999)	WOW Gospel 2000 (2000)	WOW Gospel 2001 (2001)

Professional ratings
Review scores
Source	Rating
Allmusic	4/5 stars

WOW Gospel 2000 is a gospel music compilation album in the WOW series. Released February 8, 2000, it features thirty-two songs on a double disc set. The album hit number 93 on the Billboard 200 chart in 2000, and number one on the Top Gospel Albums chart, making it the first gospel album to peak on that respective chart.

In 2001 the album was certified as platinum in the US by the Recording Industry Association of America (RIAA).

== Track listing ==
=== Disc 1 ===
1. Mighty God - The New Life Community Choir featuring John P. Kee - 3:59
2. Power Belongs To God - Hezekiah Walker and The Love Fellowship Crusade Choir - 4:14
3. Never Seen The Righteous - The Tri-City Singers - 4:43
4. Jesus Is All (remix) - Fred Hammond/Radical For Christ - 4:44
5. Who Do You Love? - Winans Phase Two - 4:39
6. Revive Us (Urban mix) - Anointed - 4:13
7. Goodtime - Brent Jones and the T.P. Mobb - 4:44
8. Testify - Commissioned - 4:24
9. Real With U - Tonéx - 5:04
10. Oh Happy Day - BeBe Winans - 5:04
11. It's All About The Love - Lamar Campbell/Spirit Of Praise - 3:56
12. Put Your War Clothes On - Virtue - 4:13
13. Wrapped Up (remix) [feat. T-Bone] - Dawkins & Dawkins - 4:04
14. Oh What A Friend - Montrell Darrett - 4:01
15. Caravan Of Love - Bob Carlisle, Marvin Sapp and Kirk Whalum - 3:47
16. Lighthouse - New Direction - 3:09
17. Word Iz Bond - BB Jay - 4:34

=== Disc 2 ===
1. God Can - Dottie Peoples - 4:46
2. Give Thanks - Marvin Sapp - 3:56
3. We Worship You - Joe Pace & The Colorado Mass Choir, featuring Fred Hammond - 5:41
4. Awesome God - Helen Baylor - 4:21
5. Healing - Richard Smallwood with Vision - 6:12
6. Reminding The Saints Of The Hope/I Know The Lord - Carlton Pearson - 6:02
7. Strong Man - Shirley Caesar - 4:26
8. I'd Rather Have Jesus - Dallas Fort Worth Mass Choir - 4:06
9. In Your Will - Men of Standard - 3:57
10. I Made It - The Canton Spirituals featuring Albertina Walker - 5:23
11. Safe In His Arms - Vickie Winans - 5:31
12. I Come To You More Than I Give - Kim Burrell - 4:20
13. Hark The Herald Angels Sing - Donnie McClurkin - 5:21
14. Secret Place - Darwin Hobbs - 4:58
15. Unconditional Love - Tarralyn Ramsey - 3:54

== Certifications ==
Region	Certification	Certified units/sales
United States (RIAA)	Platinum	1,000,000^{^}
^{^} Shipments figures based on certification alone.
