= WOW Gospel 1999 =

Compilation album by Various artists
- Released: February 23, 1999
- Genre: CCM, Gospel
- Label: Sparrow

Various artists chronology
WOW Gospel 1998 (1998)	WOW Gospel 1999 (1999)	WOW Gospel 2000 (2000)

Professional ratings
Review scores
Source	Rating
Allmusic	4.5/5 stars

WOW Gospel 1999 is a gospel music compilation album in the WOW series. Released February 23, 1999, it features thirty-three songs on two CDs. It reached 94 on the Billboard 200 chart, and second place on the Top Gospel Albums chart in 1999.

In 2003 the album was certified as platinum in the US by the Recording Industry Association of America (RIAA).

== Track listing ==
=== Disc 1 ===
1. Strength – The New Life Community Choir/John P. Kee - 4:52
2. Let The Praise Begin (live) – Fred Hammond & Radical For Christ - 4:41
3. Well, Alright – CeCe Winans - 4:16
4. Long As I Got King Jesus (Don't Need Nobody Else) (remix) – Vickie Winans - 4:24
5. Balm in Gilead – Karen Clark-Sheard - 5:04
6. Hold On (Change Is Comin') – Sounds of Blackness - 4:03
7. In Harm's Way – BeBe Winans - 5:20
8. Angels Watching Over Me – Virtue - 4:32
9. Only Believe – Yolanda Adams - 4:07
10. I Will Bless The Lord – Pastor Hezekiah Walker & The LFT Church Choir - 3:33
11. Under The Influence – Anointed - 4:05
12. Need To Know – Dawkins & Dawkins - 4:10
13. Give It Up – O'landa Draper and The Associates - 3:16
14. I Will Love You – Oleta Adams - 5:27
15. I Believe – Angie & Debbie Winans - 4:42
16. Worship Christ – New Direction - 4:01
17. You're The One – Darwin Hobbs - 3:38

=== Disc 2 ===
1. Jesus I Won't Forget - Rev. Milton Brunson & The Thompson Community Singers - 3:44
2. Just A Little Talk With Jesus – Donnie McClurkin - 4:00
3. I'm Too Close – The Williams Brothers/Stevie Wonder - 3:39
4. Clean Up – The Canton Spirituals - 3:04
5. So Good – The Colorado Mass Choir/Joe Pace - 4:37
6. For Every Mountain – Kurt Carr Singers - 5:23
7. The Vision – Patrick Love/The A.L Jinwright Mass Choir - 4:29
8. When Will We Sing The Same Song? – Victory in Praise Music And Arts Seminar Mass Choir - 5:05
9. Don't Give Up on Jesus – Daryl Coley/Vanessa Bell Armstrong/The Whitfield Company - 6:23
10. You're Next in Line for a Miracle – Shirley Caesar - 6:06
11. Testify – Dottie Peoples - 4:37
12. Stand Up on Your Feet – Lamar Campbell/Spirit of Praise - 4:05
13. If It Had Not Been for the Lord on My Side – Helen Baylor - 2:27
14. What A Friend – Bobby Jones & New Life/The Nashville Super Choir - 5:59
15. Just As Soon (I'll Be Shouting) – Beverly Crawford - 4:15
16. Follow Me – Maurette Brown Clark - 6:06

== Certifications ==
Region	Certification	Certified units/sales
United States (RIAA)	Platinum	1,000,000^{^}
^{^} Shipments figures based on certification alone.
