= WOW Gospel 2002 =

Compilation album by Various artists
- Released: February 5, 2002
- Genre: CCM, Gospel

Various artists chronology
WOW Gospel 2001 (2001)	WOW Gospel 2002 (2002)	WOW Gospel 2003 (2003)

Professional ratings
Review scores
Source	Rating
Allmusic	4/5 stars

WOW Gospel 2002 is a gospel music compilation album in the WOW series. Released February 5, 2002, it includes thirty songs and two bonus tracks on a double album. It reached 46 on the Billboard 200 chart in 2002, and hit number one on the Top Gospel Albums chart.

The album was certified as gold in the US in 2002 by the Recording Industry Association of America (RIAA).

== Track listing ==
=== Disc 1 ===
1. Unconditional - Kirk Franklin presents One Nation Crew (1NC) - 4:04
2. The Battle - Hezekiah Walker/LFT Church Choir - 4:19
3. Victory (Live) - Kim Burrell - 4:40
4. Jesus Children Of America - BeBe Winans featuring Stevie Wonder and Marvin Winans - 4:32
5. Born Again - LeJuene Thompson - 4:00
6. King Of Kings (He's a Wonder) - CeCe Winans - 4:24
7. You - The Bad Boy Family feat. Faith Evans, 112, Carl Thomas, Mario Winans, Thelma Guyton, Asia & Ashley, Tammy Ruggeri and Hezekiah Walker - 3:55
8. Gotta Worship - Virtue - 3:57
9. If We Pray - Anointed - 3:58
10. I Believe - Marvin Sapp - 5:06
11. Home - Deitrick Haddon - 4:07
12. Run To The Water - Beverly Crawford - 4:13
13. Deeper - Darwin Hobbs - 5:01
14. When I Think About You - Lamar Campbell/Spirit of Praise - 4:35
15. It's All About You - Smokie Norful - 4:56
16. Dear Lord - Remixx - 4:29

=== Disc 2 ===
1. When My Season Comes - Bishop TD Jakes and The Potter's House Mass Choir - 4:25
2. I Believe (live) - The New Life Community Choir/John P. Kee - 5:02
3. That's What I Believe - Donnie McClurkin - 5:18
4. You Are The Living Word - Fred Hammond & Radical For Christ - 5:27
5. Calvary - Richard Smallwood/Vision - 6:09
6. The Battle Is The Lord's - Yolanda Adams - 4:25
7. And Yet I'm Still Saved - Donald Lawrence/The Tri-City Singers - 4:48
8. Jesus Can Work It Out - Kurt Carr & The Kurt Carr Singers - 5:00
9. If We Faint Not - Ricky Dillard & New G - 4:31
10. II Chronicles - Daryl Coley & Beloved - 4:45
11. Calvary - Excelsior - 4:12
12. I Want To Be Ready - Dottie Peoples - 4:35
13. Stand Up - The Christianaires - 3:17
14. You Didn't Have To - Lee Williams & The Spiritual QC's - 4:14
15. These Thorns - Angela Spivey and The Voices of Victory - 4:40
16. Be Right - Keith "Wonderboy" Johnson & The Spiritual Voices - 4:20

== Certifications ==
Region	Certification	Certified units/sales
United States (RIAA)	Gold	500,000^{^}
^{^} Shipments figures based on certification alone.
