= WOW Gospel 2003 =

Compilation album by Various Artists
- Released: February 4, 2003
- Genre: CCM, Gospel
- Label: Verity Records

Various Artists chronology
WOW Gospel 2002 (2002)	WOW Gospel 2003 (2003)	WOW Gospel 2004 (2004)

Professional ratings
Review scores
Source	Rating
Christianity Today	4/5 stars

WOW Gospel 2003 is a gospel music compilation album from the WOW series. Released February 4, 2003, it includes a total of thirty-three songs on two CDs. The album reached 29 on the Billboard 200 chart in 2003, and hit number one on the Top Gospel Albums chart in 2004.

WOW Gospel 2003 is the first in the WOW Gospel series to use album covers to pay tribute to major cities which were influential in gospel music. The album cover pays tribute to New York City, in light of 9/11 over a year earlier.

The album was certified as platinum in the US in 2004 by the Recording Industry Association of America (RIAA).

== Track listing ==
=== Disc 1 ===
1. King Of Glory - The Commissioned Reunion - 5:05
2. I'll Make It - Hezekiah Walker & LFC, feat. John P. Kee - 3:35
3. The Best Is Yet To Come - Donald Lawrence & The Tri-City Singers - 5:01
4. Nobody - Kirk Franklin presents One Nation Crew - 4:30
5. God Has Not 4Got - Tonéx - 4:36
6. I Need You Now - Smokie Norful - 4:11
7. Secret Place - Karen Clark-Sheard - 5:30
8. Superman - Vickie Winans - 4:26
9. Praying Women (The Winans Women) - T.D. Jakes presents God's Leading Ladies - 4:01
10. Heard A Word - Michelle Williams - 4:54
11. That Ain't Nothin' - Fred Hammond - 5:17
12. Standing On The Rock - Marvin Sapp - 4:27
13. Anyhow - Deitrick Haddon - 4:06
14. Beautiful - Brent Jones & The TP Mobb - 4:35
15. Takin' It To The Streets - Take 6 - 4:08
16. Without Him - Debra Killings - 3:17
17. People Get Ready - The Blind Boys of Alabama - 3:22

=== Disc 2 ===
1. In The Sanctuary - Kurt Carr & The Kurt Carr Singers - 6:09
2. Anthem Of Praise - Richard Smallwood/Vision - 5:15
3. He's The Greatest - John P. Kee & New Life - 5:00
4. There's Nobody Like Jesus - Darwin Hobbs featuring Shirley Murdock - 4:47
5. Let Us Worship Him - Yolanda Adams - 3:35
6. Praise Is What I Do - Shekinah Glory Ministry - 6:45
7. I'll Trust You Lord - Donnie McClurkin - 5:35
8. Can't Give Up Now - Mary Mary - 4:59
9. Jesus, Jesus, Jesus - Aaron Neville - 4:24
10. God's Got A Blessing (With My Name On It!) - Norman Hutchins - 4:22
11. Glad About It! - Joe Pace & The Colorado Mass Choir - 4:28
12. Send A Revival - Keith "Wonderboy" Johnson & The Spiritual Voices - 3:54
13. Closet Religion - Dottie Peoples - 4:00
14. One More Battle To Fight - Shirley Caesar - 3:55
15. Drug Me - The Canton Spirituals - 4:19
16. Do Your Will - The Rance Allen Group - 4:15

== Certifications ==
Region	Certification	Certified units/sales
United States (RIAA)	Platinum	1,000,000^{^}
^{^} Shipments figures based on certification alone.
