= WOW Gospel 2001 =

Compilation album by Various artists
- Released: February 6, 2001
- Genre: CCM, Gospel

Various artists chronology
WOW Gospel 2000 (2000)	WOW Gospel 2001 (2001)	WOW Gospel 2002 (2001)

Professional ratings
Review scores
Source	Rating
Allmusic	4/5 stars

WOW Gospel 2001 is a gospel music compilation album in the WOW series. Released February 6, 2001, it comprises thirty-two songs on a double disc set. The album reached 75 on the Billboard 200 chart in 2001, and hit number one in both 2001 and 2002 on the Top Gospel Albums chart.

In 2002 the album was certified as platinum in the US by the Recording Industry Association of America (RIAA).

== Track listing ==
=== Disc 1 ===
1. Shackles (Praise You) - Mary Mary - 3:17
2. Let's Dance (remix) - Hezekiah Walker & The Love Fellowship Crusade Choir, featuring BB Jay and Dave Hollister - 3:55
3. Right Here - New Life Community Choir/John P. Kee - 3:50
4. I Want My Destiny (live) - Fred Hammond/Radical For Christ (RFC) - 5:22
5. That'll Do It - Anointed - 4:55
6. It's Alright (Send Me) - Winans Phase 2 - 4:02
7. Personal Jesus - Tonéx - 3:29
8. Alabaster Box - CeCe Winans - 5:34
9. God's Favor - Donald Lawrence presents The Tri-City Singers, featuring Kelly Price, Kim Burrell and Karen Clark-Sheard - 4:52
10. Still I Rise - Yolanda Adams - 5:42
11. I'll Keep Holding On - Kim Burrell - 2:49
12. His Love - BB Jay - 4:04
13. Walk Right - Commissioned - 4:04
14. Everyday - Darwin Hobbs, featuring Michael McDonald - 5:03
15. Fall Down 2000 - Kelli Williams - 4:31
16. I Came To Jesus - New Direction - 3:34
17. Real - The Tommies - 4:29

=== Disc 2 ===
1. Rejoice - Shirley Caesar - 4:49
2. Battlefield - Norman Hutchins - 4:16
3. At The Table - Richard Smallwood - 4:51
4. We Fall Down - Donnie McClurkin - 4:54
5. If It Had Not Been for the Lord on My Side - Helen Baylor - 2:31
6. Memories (When Will I See You Again?) - The Canton Spirituals - 8:46
7. Mary Don't You Weep - Aaron Neville - 2:23
8. The Holy Place - Ricky Dillard & New G - 5:19
9. Closer - Lamar Campbell/Spirit Of Praise featuring Denise Clark - 5:28
10. Nothing Else Matters - Marvin Sapp - 5:40
11. God's Got It - Joe Pace & The Colorado Mass Choir - 4:28
12. Tell It - Tarralyn Ramsey - 6:06
13. I Anoint Myself - F. Hammond Music featuring Pamkenyon M. Donald - 5:14
14. Once - Londa Larmond - 3:33
15. Better Days - The Wordd - 3:19

== Certifications ==
Region	Certification	Certified units/sales
United States (RIAA)	Platinum	1,000,000^{^}
^{^} Shipments figures based on certification alone.
