= Praise Is What I Do =

"Praise Is What I Do" is a worship ballad from the Shekinah Glory Ministry's 2001 debut album and was written and sung by William Murphy. Shekinah Glory performed this song on the 2003 Stellar Awards.

It has appeared on many other albums, including:

- All Day (2005)
- Smooth Jazz Tribute (2008)
- 16 Great Gospel Classics, Vol. 3 (2004)
- Steadfast (2005)
- Be Glorified, Vol. 2 (2004)
- Praise Is What I Do (2001)
- Gospel Choirs Top 20 (2007)
- WOW Gospel 2003 (2003)
- Celebrate!: Songs of Worship (2007)
- Pure Gospel: Top Gospel Choirs: Live In Praise & Worship (2006)

== See also ==
- Shekinah Glory Ministry
- William Murphy
- Urban contemporary gospel
