= Shekinah Glory Ministry =

American gospel music group ministry

- Origin: Chicago, Illinois
- Genres: gospel music, urban contemporary gospel, traditional black gospel
- Years active: 2000–present
- Label: Kingdom
- Members: Encouragers; Exalters; Karar; Minstrels; Signs & Wonders; Standard Bearers
- Website: sgmsurrender.com

Shekinah Glory Ministry is an American gospel music group ministry from Chicago, Illinois, which started making music in 2000. The group is from Valley Kingdom Ministries International in Chicago. They have their own label imprint, Kingdom Records, that all albums are released under. They have released nine albums, with five of them appearing on various Billboard charts. Their greatest-hits collection The Best of Shekinah Glory Ministry also charted on the Billboard charts in 2009. There are six different aspects to the group from Encouragers, Exalters, Karar, Minstrels, Signs & Wonders, and Standard Bearers.

== Background ==
The Chicago, Illinois-based gospel music group ministry, Shekinah Glory Ministry started in 2000 at Valley Kingdom Ministries International. They have six different aspects to their group from Encouragers (ministers to attendees of their services), Exalters (singers), Karar (dancers), Minstrels (musicians), Signs & Wonders (sign-language interpreters), Standard Bearers (flag wavers).

== History ==
The ministry released ten albums from 2000 until 2012, with six of those charting on various Billboard charts. The group has their own label imprint, Kingdom Records, that all albums are released under. The albums that charted were Praise Is What I Do in 2000, Live in 2005, Jesus in 2007, Refreshed by Fire in 2010, and Surrender in 2012. The ministry released, The Best of Shekinah Glory Ministry in 2009, that charted on various charts. The album, Live was rated eight out of ten by Cross Rhythms and the subsequent album, Jesus received a nine out of ten review by the publication. Their album Refreshed by Fire was rated three out of five stars at AllMusic, while their Surrender release was rather three and a half out of five stars. Their songs have been put on the WOW Gospel albums in 2003 and 2009.

== Members ==
- Encouragers – Ministers to attendees of their services
- Exalters – Singers
- Karar – Dancers
- Minstrels – Musicians
- Signs & Wonders – Sign-language interpreters
- Standard Bearers – Flag wavers

== Discography ==
List of albums, with selected chart positions
Title	Album details	Peak chart positions			
Title	Album details	US	US Gos	US Indie	US Heat
Praise Is What I Do	Released: August 14, 2001; Label: Kingdom; CD, digital download	–	5	13	19
Live	Released: December 7, 2004; Label: Kingdom; CD, digital download	–	3	23	15
Jesus	Released: September 25, 2007; Label: Kingdom; CD, digital download	93	1	11	–
The Best of Shekinah Glory Ministry	Released: March 24, 2009; Label: Kingdom; CD, digital download	168	6	26	–
Refreshed by Fire	Released: September 14, 2010; Label: Kingdom; CD, digital download	61	1	12	–
Praise	Released: May 15, 2012; Label: Kingdom; CD, digital download	–	–	–	–
Worship	Released: May 15, 2012; Label: Kingdom; CD, digital download	–	–	–	–
How Deeply	Released: July 31, 2012; Label: Kingdom; CD, digital download	–	–	–	–
Higher	Released: July 31, 2012; Label: Kingdom; CD, digital download	–	–	–	–
Surrender	Released: September 25, 2012; Label: Kingdom; CD, digital download	196	7	45	–
