= William Becton =

American songwriter

- Born: William Earl Becton, Jr. December 31, 1968 (age 57); Washington, D.C.
- Genres: gospel, Christian R&B, contemporary R&B, traditional black gospel, urban contemporary gospel, southern gospel
- Occupations: Singer, songwriter
- Instruments: vocals, singer-songwriter
- Years active: 1995–present
- Labels: Intersound, CGI, A&M, Tyscot
- Website: williambecton.org

William Earl Becton, Jr. (born December 31, 1968) is an American gospel musician. He started his music career, in 1995, with the release of, Broken, that was released by Intersound Records. His second album, Heart of a Love Song, was released by CGI Records in association with A&M Records in 1997. The third release, B2k: Prophetic Songs of Promise, was released by CGI Records in 2000. He released his fourth album, Broken, Vol. 2: Live, with Tyscot Records in 2003. He got all of his album to chart on the Billboard magazine Gospel Albums chart.

== Early life ==
Becton was born on December 31, 1968, in Washington, D.C., as William Earl Becton, Jr. He started singing at the age of four in his church choir called the intermediate youth choir, and he went to Sewell Music Conservatory to hone his singing acumen, when he was just eight years old. Becton is a graduate of Duke Ellington School for the Arts, and went on to study at the University of the District of Columbia.

== Music career ==
His music career started in 1995, with the release of Broken by Intersound Records on June 1, 1995, and this album would go on to be his breakthrough release on the Billboard magazine charts, peaking at No. 1 on the Gospel Albums chart and selling over 1 million units. His next release, Heart of a Love Song, was released by CGI Records in association with A&M Records on October 14, 1997, and this also charted on the Gospel Albums chart at No. 5. The next release with GGI Records was released on April 18, 2000, B2K: Prophetic Songs Of Promise, and again this charted on the Gospel Albums chart at No. 9. He released, Broken, Vol. 2: Live, with Tyscot Records on May 20, 2003, and this would chart on the Gospel Albums at No. 25.

== Discography ==
List of studio albums, with selected chart positions
Title	Album details	Peak chart positions
Title	Album details	US Gos
Broken	Released: June 1, 1995; Label: Intersound; CD, digital download	1
Heart of a Love Song	Released: October 14, 1997; Label: CGI/A&M; CD, digital download	5
B2K: Prophetic Songs of Promise	Released: April 18, 2000; Label: CGI; CD, digital download	9
Broken, Vol. 2: Live	Released: May 20, 2003; Label: Tyscot; CD, digital download	25
