= Lamar Campbell (musician) =

American gospel musician

- Born: Millard Lamar Campbell; February 13, 1964 (age 62); Indianapolis, Indiana
- Genres: Gospel, traditional black gospel, contemporary gospel
- Occupations: Singer, songwriter
- Instruments: Vocals, singer-songwriter
- Years active: 1987–present
- Labels: Tyscot, EMI Gospel, Alliant, NuSpring, Soul Stride
- Formerly of: Spirit of Praise
- Website: lamarcampbell.com

Millard Lamar Campbell II (born February 13, 1964) is an American gospel musician. He is best known for his 2000 song ""More Than Anything".

The Lamar Campbell & Spirit of Praise anthem, “ More Than Anything” was named one of the top 100 gospel songs of all time in ROOT magazine July 2023

He started his music career in 1987, and has since created the group Spirit of Praise that are based out of Indianapolis, Indiana. They have released nine albums with six of them charting on the Billboard magazine Gospel Albums chart. He has released albums with a few labels, such as the following: Tyscot, EMI Gospel, Alliant, NuSpring, Soul Stride

== Biography ==
Campbell was born Millard Lamar Campbell, on February 13, 1964, in Indianapolis, Indiana. His parents reared him in the Haughville Seventh Day Adventist Church, where he played the piano for the church choir at an early age. He is a graduate of Broad Ripple High School, and went on to study music at Butler University.

Campbell became a minister of music in 1987 and formed his first group called Lamar Campbell & Praise. In 1992, the group disbanded as Campbell felt he was becoming arrogant due to its success, and wanted to spend time focusing on God's work instead. In 1995, he composed Lamar Campbell & Spirit of Praise, while he was at Light of the World Church, as their music minister.

His music career began in 1987, with the release of Ready by Tyscot Records on April 16, 1989, yet this did not chart. After the group disbanded and Spirits of Praise were formed in 1995, Campbell's success in the music industry started to improve. The self-titled album, Lamar Campbell & Spirit of Praise, was released on May 19, 1998, by EMI Gospel. This was his breakthrough release on the Billboard magazine Gospel Albums chart, which he would get five more albums to chart on that particular chart. He has released albums with five labels, Tyscot Records, EMI Gospel, Alliant Records, NuSpring Records, and Soul Stride Records.

His 2000 album, When I Think About You, produced his most popular song, the Rick Robinson-penned "More Than Anything". It has since been covered by the Sunday Service Choir on their 2019 album Jesus Is Born.

== Discography ==
List of studio albums, with selected chart positions
Title	Album details	Peak chart positions
Title	Album details	US Gos
Ready	Released: April 16, 1989; Label: Tyscot; CD, digital download	–
Lamar Campbell & Spirit of Praise	Released: May 19, 1998; Label: EMI Gospel; CD, digital download	21
I Need Your Spirit	Released: July 27, 1999; Label: EMI Gospel; CD, digital download	12
When I Think About You	Released: October 24, 2000; Label: EMI Gospel; CD, digital download	11
The Praise Collection	Released: March 26, 2002; Label: EMI Gospel; CD, digital download	34
Confessions of a Worshipper	Released: August 19, 2003; Label: EMI Gospel; CD, digital download	13
From the Heart	Released: September 6, 2005; Label: Alliant; CD, digital download	–
New Song, New Sound	Released: November 20, 2007; Label: NuSpring; CD, digital download	–
Open the Sky	Released: 2013; Label: Soul Stride; CD, digital download	40
