= Dottie Peoples =

Gospel singer from Dayton, Ohio, United States

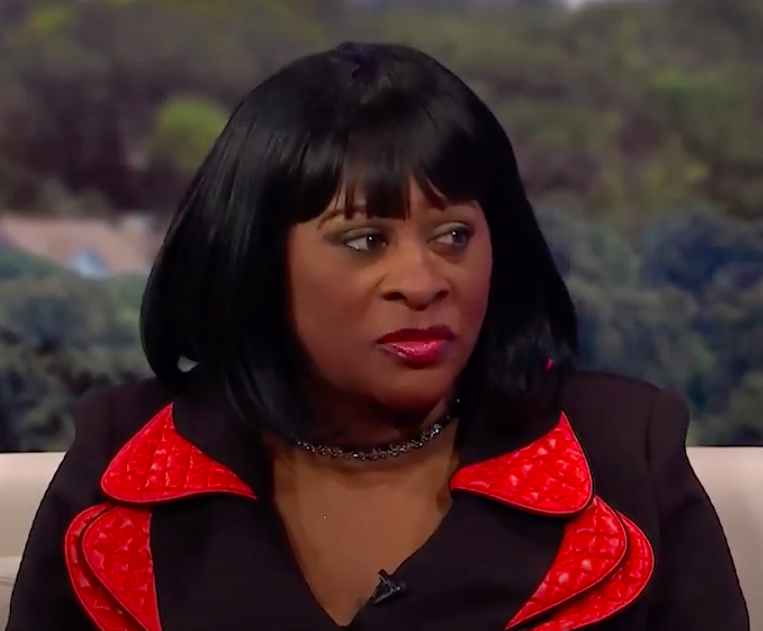
- Peoples in 2020

Background information
- Born: Dayton, Ohio, U.S.
- Genres: Gospel, jazz
- Occupation(s): Singer-songwriter, producer, tour director
- Years active: 1974–present
- Labels: Church Door, Atlanta International, AIR Gospel, DP Muzik Group
- Website: dottiepeoples.com

Dorothy "Dottie" Peoples is an American gospel singer from Dayton, Ohio. She has been dubbed "Songbird of the South."

== Career ==
After completing high school, she toured with gospel pioneer Dorothy Norwood, a member of the Caravans. After a stint in jazz, she relocated to Atlanta in 1979, and returned to her gospel roots.

Peoples performed with Widespread Panic at the inaugural Bonnaroo Music Festival in 2002 and with Dorothy Norwood. She sang "The Star-Spangled Banner" at the 1996 Olympics, "He's an On Time God" at the memorial service for John Lewis, and at the 2020 Stellar Awards.

Peoples has an honorary Doctor of Sacred Music from the Global Evangelical Christian College, part of the International Circle of Faith Colleges and Seminaries network. She has toured regularly with her friend Garnelle Hubbard-Spearman. She has been dubbed "Songbird of the South."

== Discography ==
- Surely God Is Able (Church Door, 1984) – 37 weeks on Billboard's Top Gospel Albums chart, peaking at #17 on June 8, 1984
- Is It Worth It All? (Church Door, 1987)
- Live at Salem Baptist Church (Atlanta International, 1993)
- Christmas With Dottie (Atlanta International, 1995)
- Live: Featuring "On time God" (Atlanta International, 1995) – 112 weeks on Billboard's Top Gospel Albums chart, peaking at #3 on February 2, 1996
- Count on God, Live (Atlanta International, 1996)
- Testify (Atlanta International, 1997) – 47 weeks on Billboard's Top Gospel Albums chart, peaking at #14 on August 22, 1997
- The Collection: Songs of Love & Faith (Atlanta International, 1998) – 1 week on Billboard's Top Gospel Albums chart, peaking at #38 on August 21, 1998
- God Can & God Will (Atlanta International, 1999) – 66 weeks on Billboard's Top Gospel Albums chart, peaking at #8 on September 10, 1999
- Show Up and Show Out (Atlanta International, 2000) – 31 weeks on Billboard's Top Gospel Albums chart, peaking at #10 on February 2, 2001
- Churchin' with Dottie (Atlanta International, 2002) – 80 weeks on Billboard's Top Gospel Albums chart, peaking at #10 on November 8, 2002; 56 weeks on Billboard's Top R&B/Hip-hop Albums chart, peaking at #49 on August 29, 2003
- The Water I Give (Atlanta International, 2003)
- Live In Memphis – He Said It (AIR Gospel, 2005) – 1 week on Billboard's Top Gospel Albums chart, peaking at #50 on July 15, 2015
- Do It! (DP Muzik Group / Comin Atcha Music, Inc., 2008) – 13 weeks on Billboard's Top Gospel Albums chart, peaking at #13 on October 10, 2008
- I Got This: Live! (DP Muzik Group, 2013) – 10 weeks on Billboard's Top Gospel Albums chart, peaking at #14 on February 22, 2013

== Awards ==
Caption
| Year | Awards show | Nomination | Category | Result |
|---|---|---|---|---|
| 1994 | Atlanta Gospel Choice Award | "Pure Love" | Song of the Year | Won |
| 1994 | Atlanta Gospel Choice Award | (herself) | Female Soloist Traditional | Won |
| 1995 | Atlanta Gospel Choice Award | "On Time God" | Song of the Year | Won |
| 1995 | Atlanta Gospel Choice Award | | Best Choir of the Year | Won |
| 1995 | Atlanta Gospel Choice Award | "Everybody Ought to Know Who Jesus Is" | Song of the Year | Won |
| 1995 | Gospel Music Workshop of America/Gospel Excellence Awards | | Album of the Year-Traditional | |
| 1995 | Gospel Music Workshop of America/Gospel Excellence Awards | (herself) | Female Vocalist of the Year | |
| 1995 | Gospel Music Workshop of America/Gospel Excellence Awards | "On Time God" | Song of the Year | |
| 1995 | Vision Awards | | Bobby Jones Gospel | Won |
| 1995 | Stellar Awards | (herself) | Female Vocalist-Traditional | Won |
| 1995 | Stellar Awards | | Choir of the Year-Traditional | Won |
| 1995 | Stellar Awards | On Time God | Album of the Year | Won |
| 1995 | Stellar Awards | "On Time God" | Song of the Year | Won |
| 1996 | Stellar Awards | (herself) | Top Female Vocalist | Won |
| 1996 | NAACP Phoenix Awards | (herself) | Female Vocalist of the Year | Won |
| 1997 | Gospel Music Workshop of America/Gospel Excellence Awards | | Traditional Album of the Year | |
| 1997 | Gospel Music Workshop of America/Gospel Excellence Awards | (herself) | Traditional Female Vocalist of the Year | |
| 1997 | Gospel Music Workshop of America/Gospel Excellence Awards | "Count On God" | Song of the Year | |
| 1997 | National Association of Independent Record Distributors (Indie Award) | | Gospel Album of the Year | |
| 1997 | James Cleveland Lifetime Achievement Award | | | Won |
| 2000 | 42nd Annual Grammy Awards | God Can & God Will | Grammy Award for Best Traditional Gospel Album | Nominated |
| 2000 | Soul Train Music Awards | God Can & God Will | Best Gospel Album of the Year | Won |
| 2000 | Dove Awards | God Can | Traditional Gospel Recorded Song of the Year | Won |
| 2002 | 44th Annual Grammy Awards | Show Up and Show Out | Grammy Award for Best Traditional Gospel Album | Nominated |
| 2005 | 47th Annual Grammy Awards | The Water I Give | Grammy Award for Best Traditional Gospel Album | Nominated |
