= Colorado Mass Choir =

American gospel choir

The Colorado Mass Choir is an American gospel choir. Its director is Joe Pace. The choir was founded by the late Reverend James Moore. They released their first album in 1996, produced by Paul Wright III, which won a Stellar Award for New Artist of the Year. Several releases on Verity Records followed.

== Discography ==
- Watch God Move (Verity Records, 1996) U.S. Gospel #17
- So Good! (Verity, 1998) U.S. Gospel #10
- God's Got It (Verity, 1999)
- Speak Life (Integrity Gospel, 2003)
- Praise 'Til You Breakthrough (Alliant Music, 2006)
