= Joe Pace (musician) =

American gospel musician (born 1965)

- Also known as: Dr. Joe Pace
- Born: Joseph W. Pace II; October 20, 1965 (age 60); Homestead, Florida, U.S.
- Origin: Colorado, U.S.
- Genres: Gospel; traditional black gospel; urban contemporary gospel
- Occupations: Singer; songwriter; producer
- Instruments: Vocals; piano
- Years active: 1996–present
- Labels: Zomba; Verity; Alliant; Word; Epic; Integrity; Columbia; NuSpring; Sony; Tyscot
- Member of: Colorado Mass Choir
- Website: joepace.org

Joseph Wadell Pace II (born October 20, 1965) is an American gospel music songwriter, producer, and musician. He started his music career in 1996, with Colorado Mass Choir. They have released 14 albums with 11 of them charting on the Billboard magazine Gospel Albums chart. Pace has released albums with several record labels including Zomba Records, Verity Records, Alliant Records, Word Records, Epic Records, Integrity Music, Columbia Records, NuSpring Music, Sony Music, and Tyscot Records.

== Early life ==
Pace was born on October 20, 1965, in Homestead, Florida, as Joseph W. Pace II, His father served in the military which was the reason the family relocated to Colorado. He is an ordained Baptist and Church of God in Christ preacher, and he got his honorary doctorate from Inman Bible College.

== Career ==
Pace's music career began in 1996, with the Colorado Mass Choir that was formed in 1995 with choir members from various churches in Colorado. He has released fourteen albums, with all but three of those charting on the Billboard magazine Gospel Albums chart.

Pace's albums included 1997's Watch God Move with Zomba Records, 1998's So Good! with Verity Records, 1999's God's Got It with Verity Records, 2001's Joe Pace Presents: Let There Be Praise with Word Records, Epic Records, and Integrity Music, 2001's Glad About It with Word, Epic, and Integrity, 2002's Joe Pace Presents: Shake the Foundation with Integrity, 2002' In the Spirit with Integrity, 2003's Speak Life with Integrity, 2004's Joe Pace Presents: Sunday Morning Service with Integrity and Epic, 2006's Might Long Way with Columbia Records, 2006's Praise 'Til You Breakthrough with Alliant Records, 2007's Joe Pace Presents: Worship for the Kingdom with NuSpring Music, 2007's Joe Pace Presents: Worship for the Kids with Sony Music, and 2010's Joe Pace Presents: Praise for the Sanctuary with Tyscot Records. These albums charted on the Billboard magazine Gospel Albums chart, except for Speak Life, Praise 'Til You Breakthrough, and Joe Pace Presents: Worship for the Kids.

In November 2022, Pace released the single All Things Are Working.

== Awards ==
Pace won the Stellar Award for New Artist of the year in 1997 with The Colorado Mass Choir. He was also nominated in the Best Gospel Choir or Chorus Album in Grammy Awards.

== Discography ==
List of studio albums, with selected chart positions
Title	Album details	Peak chart positions
Title	Album details	US Gos
Watch God Move	Released: May 20, 1996; Label: Zomba; CD, digital download	17
So Good!	Released: February 24, 1998; Label: Verity; CD, digital download	10
God's Got It	Released: August 24, 1999; Label: Verity; CD, digital download	16
Joe Pace Presents: Let There Be Praise!	Released: February 20, 2001; Label: Word/Epic/Integrity; CD, digital download	29
Glad About It!	Released: December 18, 2001; Label: Word/Epic/Integrity; CD, digital download	9
Joe Pace Presents: Shake the Foundation	Released: July 23, 2002; Label: Integrity; CD, digital download	9
In the Spirit	Released: 2002; Label: Integrity; CD, digital download	–
Speak Life	Released: July 22, 2003; Label: Integrity; CD, digital download	22
Joe Pace Presents: Sunday Morning Service	Released: August 24, 2004; Label: Integrity; CD, digital download	7
Mighty Long Way	Released: April 18, 2006; Label: Columbia; CD, digital download	16
Praise 'Til You Breakthrough	Released: July 25, 2006; Label: Integrity; CD, digital download	
Joe Pace Presents: Worship for the Kingdom	Released: October 23, 2007; Label: NuSpring; CD, digital download	25
Joe Pace Presents: Worship for the Kids	Released: October 23, 2007; Label: Sony Music; CD, digital download	
Joe Pace Presents: Praise for the Sanctuary	Released: 2010; Label: Tyscot; CD, digital download	11
