= Transformer (disambiguation) =

A transformer is a device that transfers electrical energy from one circuit to another.

Transformer may also refer to:

== Art and entertainment ==
- Characters in the Transformers franchise
- Transformer (film), a 2017 Canadian documentary
- Transformer, a 1986 Sega arcade game
- Transformer: The Deep Chemistry of Life and Death, a 2022 book by Nick Lane

=== Music ===
- Transformer (David Stoughton album), 1968
- Transformer (Lou Reed album), 1972
- Transformer (Bruce Kulick album), 2003
- "Transformer", a song by Gnarls Barkley from St. Elsewhere
- "Transformer", a song by Marnie Stern from This Is It and I Am It and You Are It and So Is That and He Is It and She Is It and It Is It and That Is That

== Science and technology ==
- Generative pre-trained transformer, a type of artificial intelligence language model
- Transformer (deep learning), a machine learning architecture
- Transformer (flying car), a DARPA military project
- "Electronic transformer", a term commonly used in extra-low-voltage lighting applications for a switched-mode power supply
- Asus Transformer, a series of hybrid tablet computers
- TrikeBuggy Transformer, a U.S. powered hang glider
- Transformer (gene), a family of genes that regulate sex determination in some insects

== Other uses ==
- Transformer (spirit-being), an indigenous tradition of the Pacific Northwest of North America
- Prada Transformer, a building in Seoul, South Korea

== See also ==
- Transformers (disambiguation)
- Transformation
- Transform
- Trans
