= Serhiy Kozmenko =

Serhiy Mykolayovych Kozmenko Сергій Миколайович Козьменко
- Born: November 3, 1961; Suhinivka, Kursk Oblast, Russian Federation
- Spouse: Professor Olga Kozmenko
- Scientific career
- Fields: methods in insurance, management of organizations, strategic management in banks, economic reproduction, environmental economics and environmental protection
- Workplaces: Ukrainian Academy of Banking of the National Bank of Ukraine

Serhiy Kozmenko (Ukrainian: Сергій Козьменко) is a Doctor of Economic Sciences, Professor and Acting Rector of the State Higher Educational Institution Ukrainian Academy of Banking of the National Bank of Ukraine.

Kozmenko was born on November 3, 1961, in the village Suhinivka (Glushkov district of the Kursk Oblast, Russian Federation).

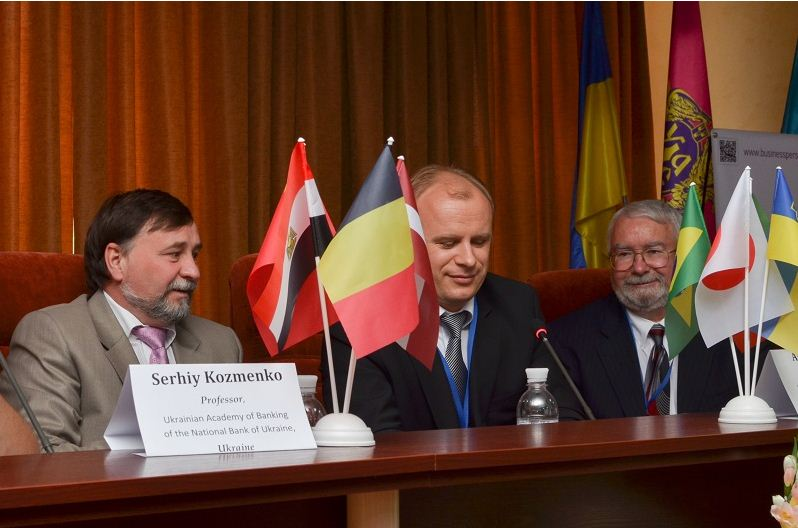
Professor S. Kozmenko – Head of the Organization Committee of the VIII International scientific and practical conference ”International banking competition: theory and practice" (Sumy, Ukraine, 23–24 May 2013)

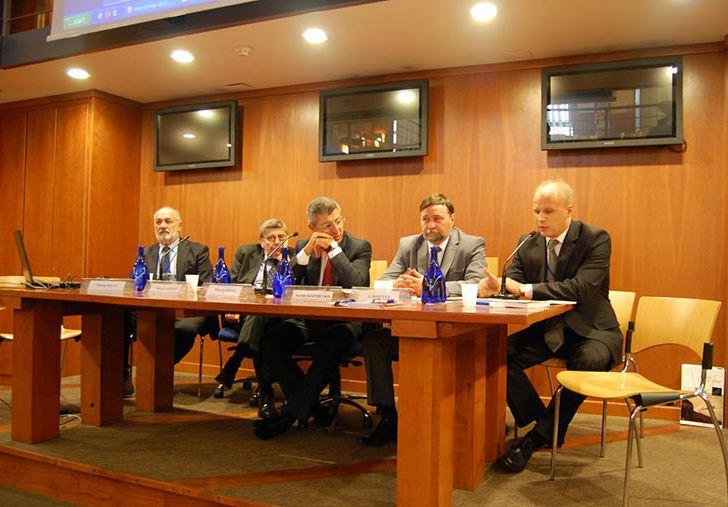
Professor S. Kozmenko – Member of the Organization Committee of the International conference “Financial Distress: Corporate Governance and Financial Reporting Issues” (Rome, Italy, 17–18 October 2013)

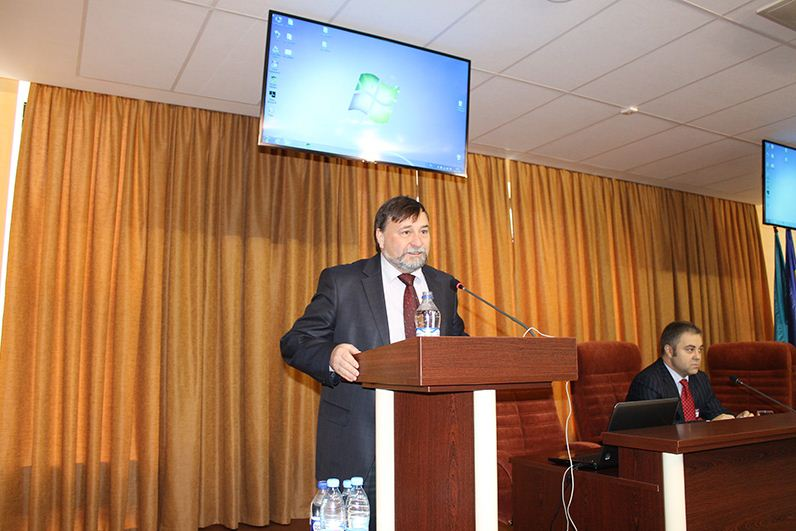
Greetings of Professor S. Kozmenko to the participants of the XVI All-Ukrainian scientific and practical conference "Problems and development prospects of the banking system of Ukraine" (Sumy, Ukraine, 24–25 October 2013)

== Scientific and research activity ==
Kozmenko is a member of the Expert Committee in the field of macroeconomics, transformations, international and regional development (economic sciences) of the Higher Attestation Commission of the Ministry of Education and Science, Youth and Sports of Ukraine.

Head of the "International Center for Global Risks Economic Research" created under the auspices of the publishing company "Business Perspectives".

Editor-in-Chief of scientific journals:

- «Problems and Perspectives in Management», ISSN 1727-7051;
- «Investment Management and Financial Innovations», ISSN 1810-4967;
- «Environmental Economics», ISSN 1998-6041

These scientific publications are included into the international bibliographic and citation database Scopus.

Member of editorial boards of the scientific journals:

- «International Journal of Business», ISSN 1083-4346;
- «Herald of the National Bank of Ukraine»
- «Herald of the Ukrainian Academy of Banking of the National Bank of Ukraine»
- «Problems and development prospects of the banking system of Ukraine»

Spheres of scientific interests: innovative methods in insurance, management of organizations, strategic management in banks, economic reproduction, environmental economics and environmental protection.

The list of scientific publications of Professor Serhiy Kozmenko is available on the website of the Scientific Library of the Ukrainian Academy of Banking.

Professor Kozmenko's articles are also included into the international bibliographic and citation database Scopus.

Member of committees for the organization of scientific conferences:

- Annual International scientific and practical conference "International banking competition: theory and practice" (Sumy, Ukraine, 2006–2013);
- Annual International scientific and practical conference "Problems and development prospects of the banking system of Ukraine" (Sumy, Ukraine, 2005–2013);
- International conference “Financial Distress: Corporate Governance and Financial Reporting Issues” (Rome, Italy, 2013);
- International conference "Corporate Governance and Regulation: Outlining New Horizons for Theory and Practice" (Pisa, Italy, 2012);
- International Students' Conference "Financial Markets and Institutions: Globalizations during the Crisis" (Sumy, Ukraine, 2011).
