= Transformation =

Transformation may refer to:

== Science and mathematics ==
=== In biology and medicine ===
- Metamorphosis, the biological process of changing physical form after birth or hatching
- Malignant transformation, the process of cells becoming cancerous
- Transformation (genetics), genetic alteration of a cell by DNA uptake

=== In mathematics ===
- Transformation (function), concerning functions from sets to themselves. For functions in the broader sense, see function (mathematics).
  - Affine transformation, in geometry
  - Linear transformation between modules in linear algebra. Also called a linear map.
    - Transformation matrix which represent linear maps in linear algebra.
- Integral transform, between a function in one domain to a function in another
- Natural transformation between functors in category theory.
- Unitary transformation, between two Hilbert spaces
- Geometric transformation, between sets of points in geometry
  - Infinitesimal transformation, a limiting case of a geometrical transformation

=== In physics and chemistry ===
- Chemical transformation
- Phase transformation, a physical transition between states of matter
- Transformation optics, generalized optical devices
- Unitary transformation (quantum mechanics)

=== In other sciences ===
- Transformation problem, in economics
- Transformation (linguistics), a type of operation in transformational grammar
- Transformation of precious metals, see synthesis of precious metals
- Data transformation (statistics)

== Arts and entertainment ==
=== In music ===
- Transformation (music)
- Transformation (Don Preston album)
- Transformation (Tal Wilkenfeld album)
- Transformation, an album by Signal Aout 42
- Transformation, an album by the Alex Skolnick Trio
- Transformations (opera), a chamber opera by the American composer Conrad Susa
- The Transformation (album), an album by James Fortune
- Transformations (album), a 1977 album by Bunky Green

=== In other arts and entertainment ===
- Transformation (novel), by Carol Berg
- Transformation, an alternate title for The Marble Faun, a novel by Nathaniel Hawthorne
- "The Transformation" (The Amazing World of Gumball), an episode of the British-American animated television series The Amazing World of Gumball
- "The Transformation", an episode of American television series Fringe
- Transformation playing card
- "Transformation" (short story), a short story by Mary Shelley
- Umformung: The Transformation, a 2016 Indian film

== In business and technology ==
=== In business ===
- Business transformation, a major change in the identity, structure, or purpose of an organization (from the field of strategic management)
- Transformation (law), a concept in copyright law
- Transformation (patent law)
- Transformation design, a design process
- Transformational leadership, a managerial approach emphasizing organizational change
- Maturity transformation, the practice of fractional reserve banks borrowing money on shorter timeframes than they lend money out
- Digital transformation

=== In computing ===
- Data transformation (computing)
- Data transformation (statistics)
- Model transformation
- Program transformation
- XML transformation
- Transformation of text

== Other uses ==
- Transformation (journal), an academic journal in the field of Biblical studies
- Transformation (warfare)
- Transformation of culture
- Transformational festival
- Spiritual transformation, a fundamental change in an individual (a psychological and New-Age concept)
- Shapeshifting, a mythological ability of humans to transform into animals, hybrid creatures, etc.
- Clinical lycanthropy, a delusion that one can actually transform into an animal

== See also ==
- Transform (disambiguation)
- Transmutation (disambiguation)
