= Dark moon (disambiguation) =

Dark moon describes the Moon during that time that it is invisible against the backdrop of the Sun in the sky.

Dark moon (or Dark Moon) may also refer to:

- "Dark Moon" (song), a 1957 song written by Ned Miller
- "Dark Moon", a 2024 song by Keung To
- Dark moon, sometimes refers to Lilith (fictitious moon), Earth's hypothetical second moon
- Luigi's Mansion: Dark Moon, the sequel to Luigi's Mansion for the Nintendo 3DS and its titular object, the Dark Moon
- Dark Moon: The Blood Altar, a South Korean manhwa series

== See also ==
- Dark Side of the Moon (disambiguation)
