= Look on the bright side =

Look on the bright side is an English language idiom that suggests trying to be optimistic.

Look on the bright side may also refer to:

- "Always Look on the Bright Side of Life", song from Monty Python's Life of Brian
- Looking on the Bright Side (1932), a British musical comedy film
- Lookin' on the Bright Side (1993), an album by Harold Mabern
- On the Bright Side Festival, an annual Australian music festival held in Perth, Western Australia

== See also ==
- The Bright Side (disambiguation)
- Look on the Blight Side, 2013 album by Louis Logic
