= Transformers (disambiguation) =

Transformers is a franchise centered on shapeshifting alien robots.

Transformers or The Transformers may also refer to:

== Film and television ==
- Transformers (film comic series)
- The Transformers: The Movie, a 1986 animated film associated with the series
- The Transformers (TV series), a 1984–1987 American animated television series
- Transformers (film series)
  - Transformers (film), a 2007 live-action film

== Video games ==
- The Transformers (1986 video game), a game for the Sinclair Spectrum and Commodore 64 computers
- Transformers (2003 video game), a video game
- Transformers (2004 video game), a video game based on Transformers: Armada

== Comics ==
- Transformers (comics)
- Transformers (2019 comic book)
- The Transformers (IDW Publishing)
- The Transformers (Marvel Comics)

== Music ==
- The Transformers: The Movie (Original Motion Picture Soundtrack), the 1986 film's soundtrack
- Transformers: The Album, the 2007 film's soundtrack
- Transformers: The Score, the 2007 film's musical score

== Other uses ==
- Transformers (board game), a 1986 board game
- Transformers: Generation 1, a line of toys produced by Hasbro
- Transformers: The Ride 3D, theme park rides located in several Universal Studios parks

== See also ==
- Transformer (disambiguation)
- Transformers: Dark of the Moon (disambiguation)
- Transformers: Revenge of the Fallen (disambiguation)
- Transformers: Robots in Disguise (disambiguation)
