= Dark of the Moon =

Dark of the Moon may refer to:

- Dark of the Moon (play), by American playwrights William Berney and Howard Richardson
- "Dark of the Moon" (The Unit), a television episode
- Dark of the Moon: Poems of Fantasy and the Macabre, a 1947 anthology edited by August Derleth
- Dark of the Moon, a 1968 mystery novel by John Dickson Carr
- Dark of the Moon, a 1985 fantasy novel by P. C. Hodgell
- Dark of the Moon, a 2005 novel by John Sandford
- Dark of the Moon, a 2009 paranormal romance novel in the Dark Guardian series
- Transformers: Dark of the Moon, a 2011 film

== See also ==
- Dark Side of the Moon (disambiguation)
- Transformers: Dark of the Moon (disambiguation)
