= Transform (consulting firm) =

American aviation and government consulting firm

- Type: Private Company
- Industry: Management consulting
- Predecessor: FocusIT Group, DifEQ Consulting
- Founded: 2001; 25 years ago
- Founders: Christopher G Burger, John C. King, and Darren R. Heil
- Headquarters: Peachtree City, Georgia, United States
- Area served: United States
- Products: Consultancy services in aviation and government
- Website: transform-government.com; transform-aviation.com

Transform is an American management consulting, technology services and process improvement firm based in Georgia. The entities comprising the Transform brand includes subsidiaries Transform Aviation LLC and DifEQ Consulting LLP.

Transform focuses on two key industries: aviation and government. Transform's clients and former clients include 40+ airlines and aviation organizations, several large US-based health systems, the US Department of Defense (through an approved GSA MOBIS Schedule, Contract Award Number GS-10F-0075V), and a number of the Fortune 500 companies.

== History ==
=== Formation ===
Transform originated as a partnership between FocusIT Group, a Georgia-based technology consulting firm founded in 2001, and DifEQ Consulting, a Georgia-based process improvement and operations reengineering consulting firm founded in 2004.

John C. King, a former CIO of Delta Air Lines previously ranked in the Top 100 U.S. Public Company IS Executives in the U.S. by InformationWeek, was CEO of FocusIT Group and a member of DifEQ Consulting's Board of Advisors. Christopher G. Burger and Darren R. Heil - the founding Partners of DifEQ Consulting - along with Mr. King, formed Transform in early 2007 with a primary focus on technology integration and process improvement.

=== Growth and Diversification ===
In February 2008, Dale J. Boylston joined Transform as Managing Partner of Healthcare resulting in the formation of Transform Healthcare LLC. A noted and published healthcare strategist, former Greystone.Net Executive and Ernst & Young Partner, Mr. Boylston focused the practice on "re-defining the Healthcare Experience" for hospitals and health systems across the country. In December 2008, Transform was awarded two contracts by Lancaster General Hospital to help formulate its healthcare experience strategy and develop a new internet for the health system's cardiovascular service line.

In mid-2008, Transform's government practice - DifEQ Consulting - applied for a Mission Oriented Business Integrated Services (MOBIS) Schedule by the U.S. General Services Administration. On February 1, 2009, the U.S. General Services Administration awarded Transform an approved GSA MOBIS Schedule, Contract Award Number GS-10F-0075V. This contract award included Consulting Services (SIN 874-1), Facilitation Services (SIN 874-2), Acquisition Management Support Services (SIN 874-6), and Program and Project Management Services (SIN 874-7).

=== Departure of founders 2010 ===
In August 2010, Transform announced the departure of Founder, Partner & CFO Darren Heil. Mr. Heil went on to serve the company as a Senior Advisor. In November 2010, Dale Boylston - Managing Partner of Transform's Healthcare practice - joined Connect Healthcare as Executive Vice President. In October 2011, Chris Burger - Founder and Managing Partner of Transform - joined Accenture as an Executive in its Communications, Media & Technology business within Aerospace & Defense.

== Notable Board of Advisors Members ==
Hollis L. Harris - former CEO of World Airways (2001–2004), CEO and President of Air Canada (1992–1996), CEO and President of Continental Airlines (1990–1992) and President of Delta Air Lines

Joseph R. Tenney - former president and CEO of Transettlements Network Services (TNS), Board of Directors for Aether Systems, and Board of Directors for the American Trucking Association

Russell H. Heil - former Executive Vice President of Operations for Delta Air Lines, and Senior Vice President of Technical Operations for Delta Air Lines

== See also ==
- Business transformation
