= Transformers: Dark of the Moon (disambiguation) =

Transformers: Dark of the Moon is a 2011 science-fiction film.

Transformers: Dark of the Moon may also refer to:

- Transformers: Dark of the Moon (video game)
- Transformers: Dark of the Moon – The Album
- Transformers: Dark of the Moon – The Score

== See also ==
- Dark of the Moon (disambiguation)
- Transformers (disambiguation)
