= Museum of Banking History in Sumy Oblast and the History of Money =

Museum of Banking history in the Sumy oblast and the History of Ukrainian Money
- Музей розвитку банківської справи на Сумщині та історії грошей
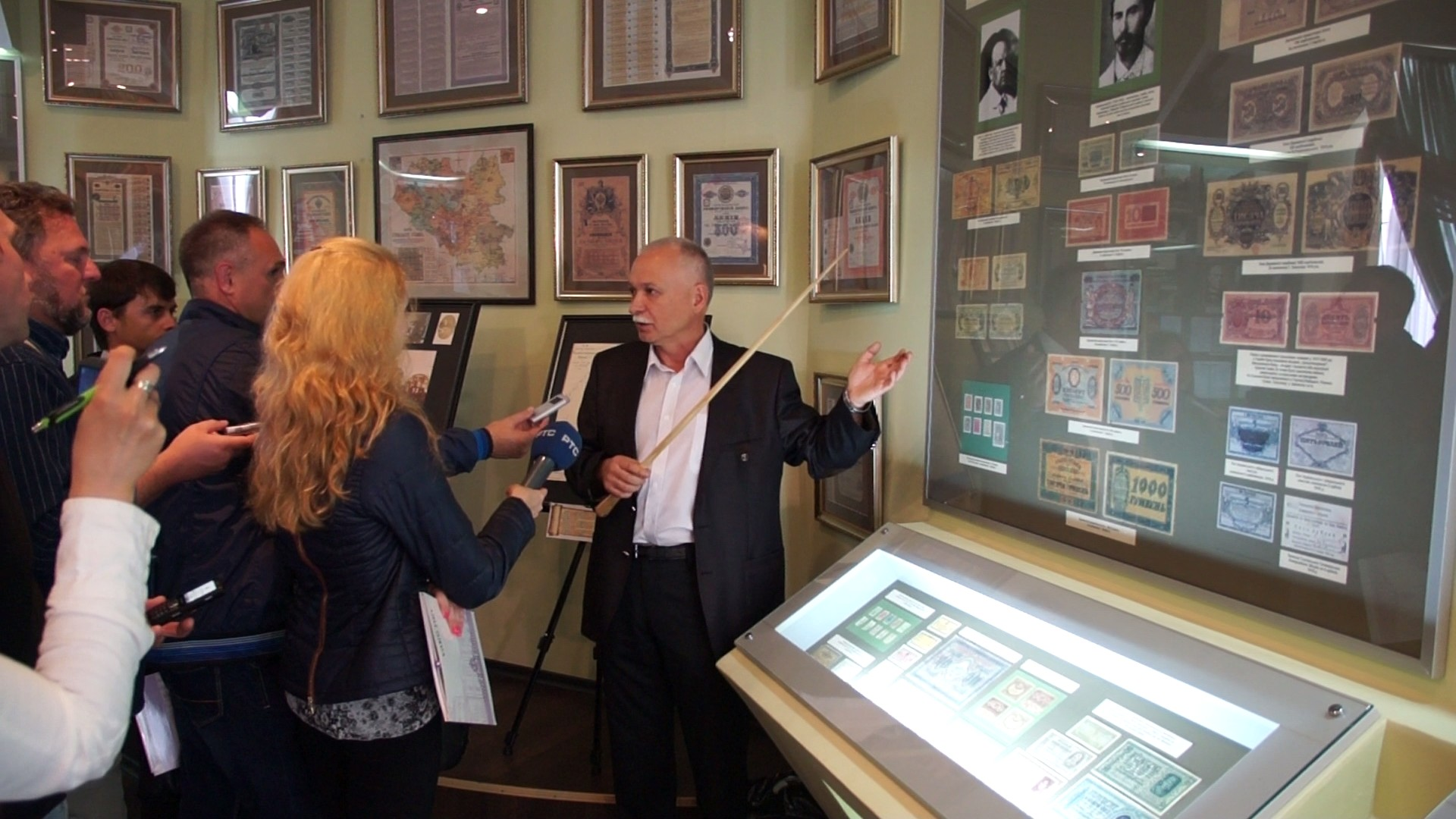
- Established: 2006
- Location: Petropavlivska Str., 57, Sumy, Ukraine
- Coordinates: 50°54′20″N 34°47′44″E
- Director: Serhiy Tyhenko
- Owner: Ukrainian Academy of Banking; National Bank of Ukraine

The Museum of Banking history in the Sumy oblast and the History of Ukrainian Money (Ukrainian: Музей розвитку банківської справи на Сумщині та історії грошей) located at the State higher educational institution "Ukrainian Academy of Banking of the National Bank of Ukraine" in Sumy. Its address is Petropavlivska Str., 57, room number 304.

== History ==
The museum was founded in 2006 to commemorate the 10th anniversary of the academy on the basis of a unique collection of Ukrainian bonds – the paper money out of circulation, which were given to the academy by the National Bank of Ukraine. The exposition of the bonds is arranged in the thematic-chronological order – from the first appearance of money to the present days. In addition to the numerous historical documents, photographs, metal money (coins, souvenir bars), commemorative medals of the National Bank of Ukraine there is an exhibition presenting technical appliances used in the banking industry in the late 20th century. The museum’s exhibition is regularly updated with new historical exhibits - photographs, securities, and personal paraphernalia of bankers.

== Thematic areas ==
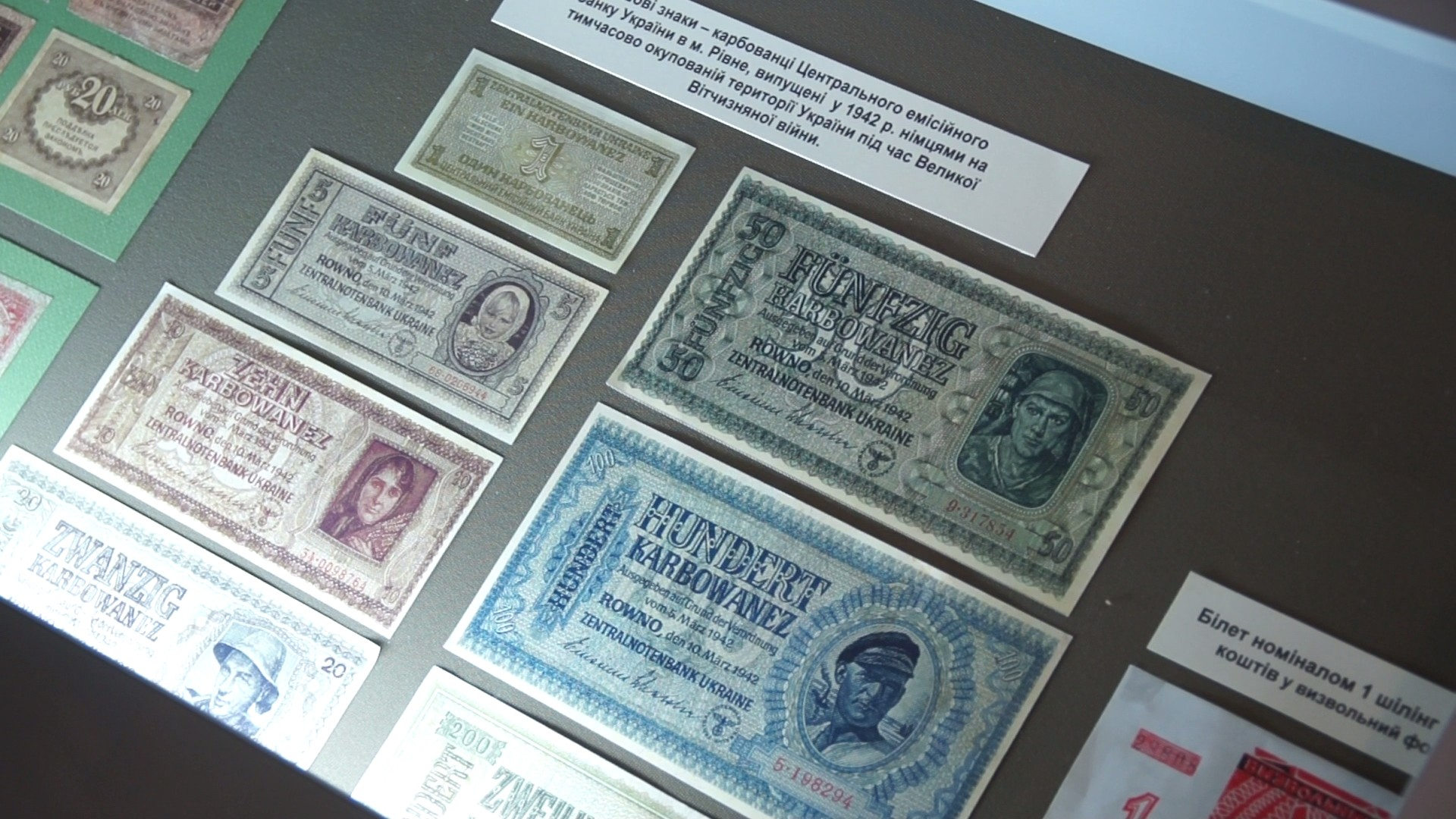
Old Ukrainian paper money.

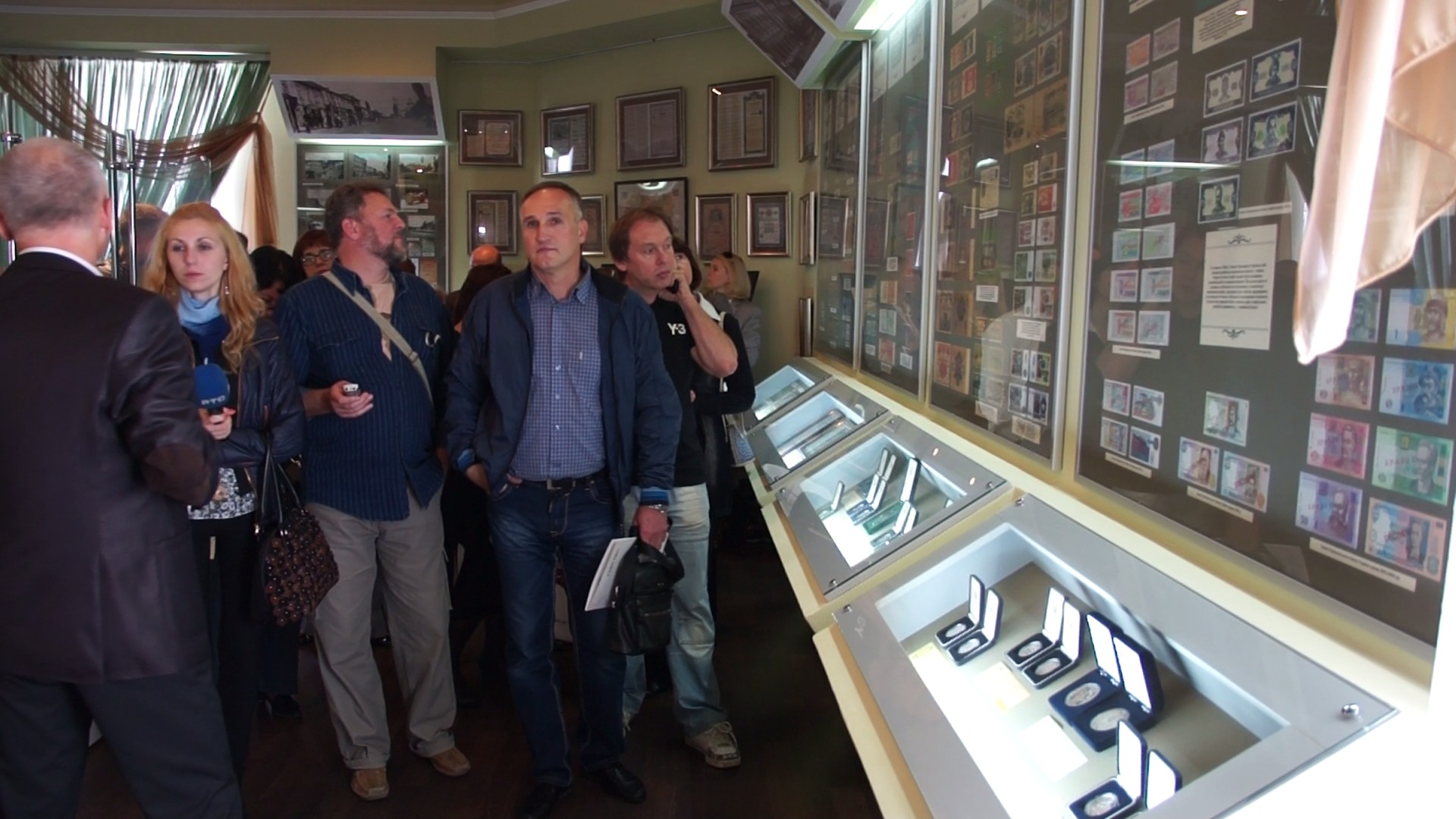
During the presentation at the museum.

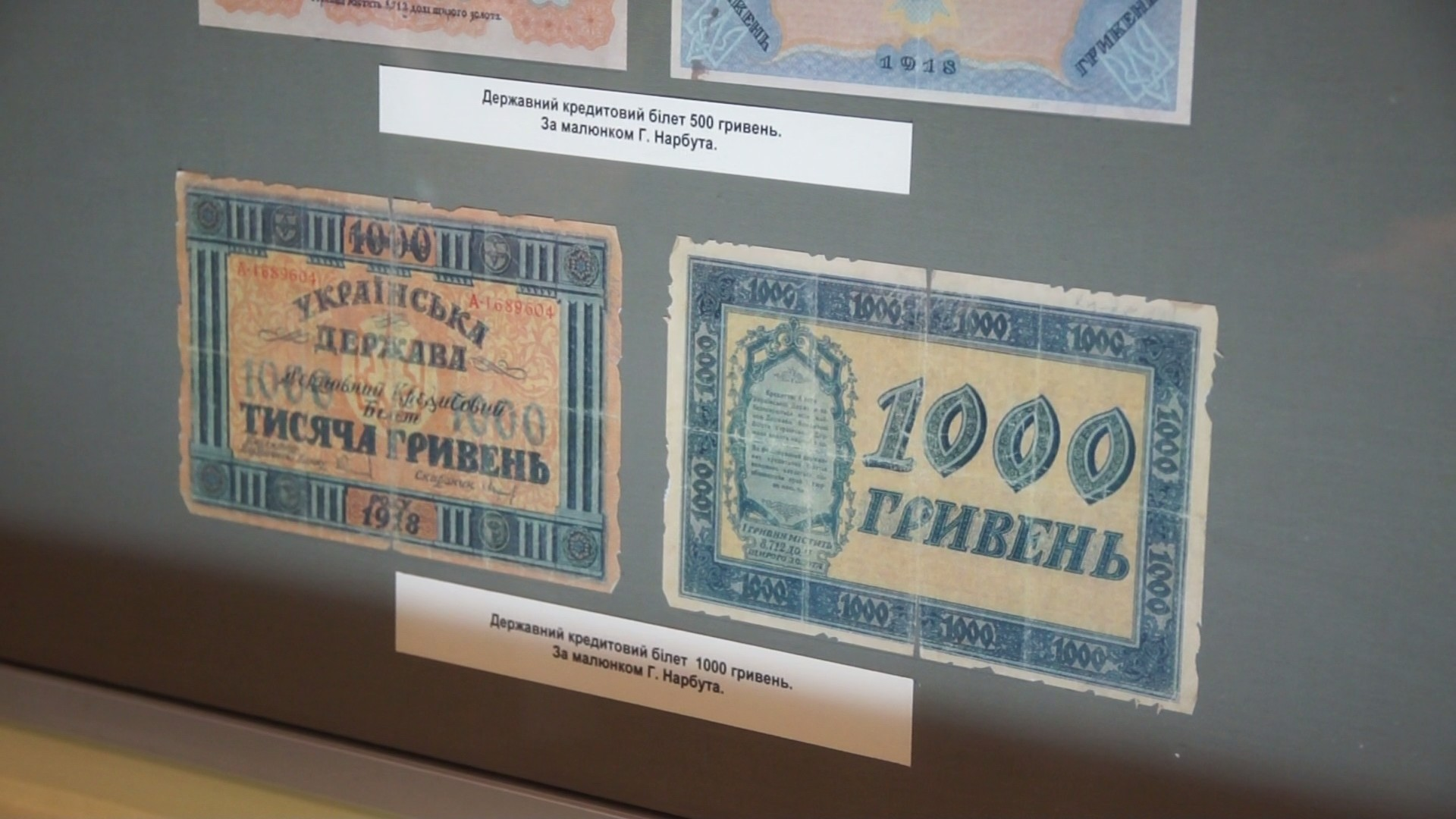
Old Ukrainian paper money.

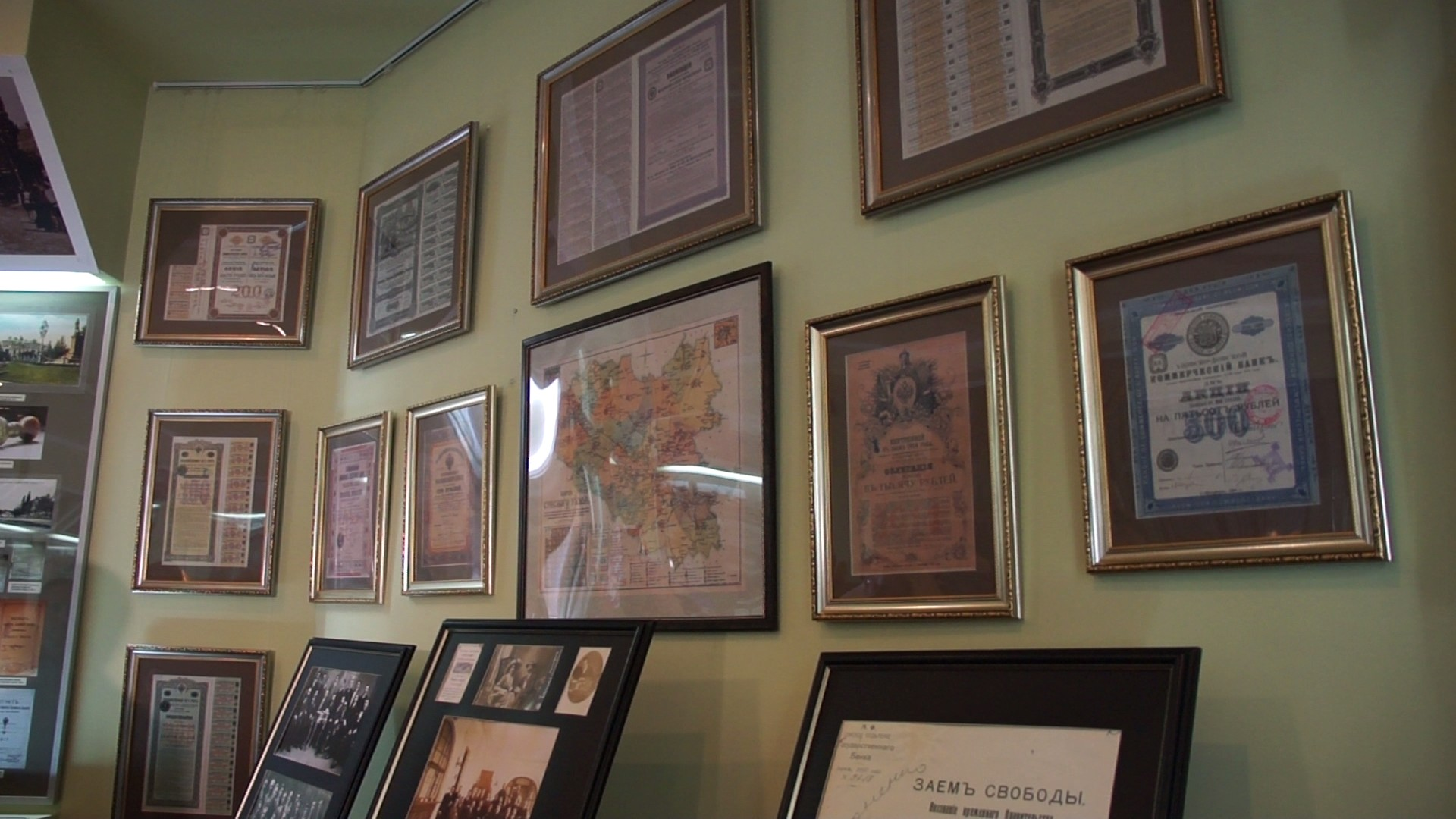
Old banking documents at exposition.

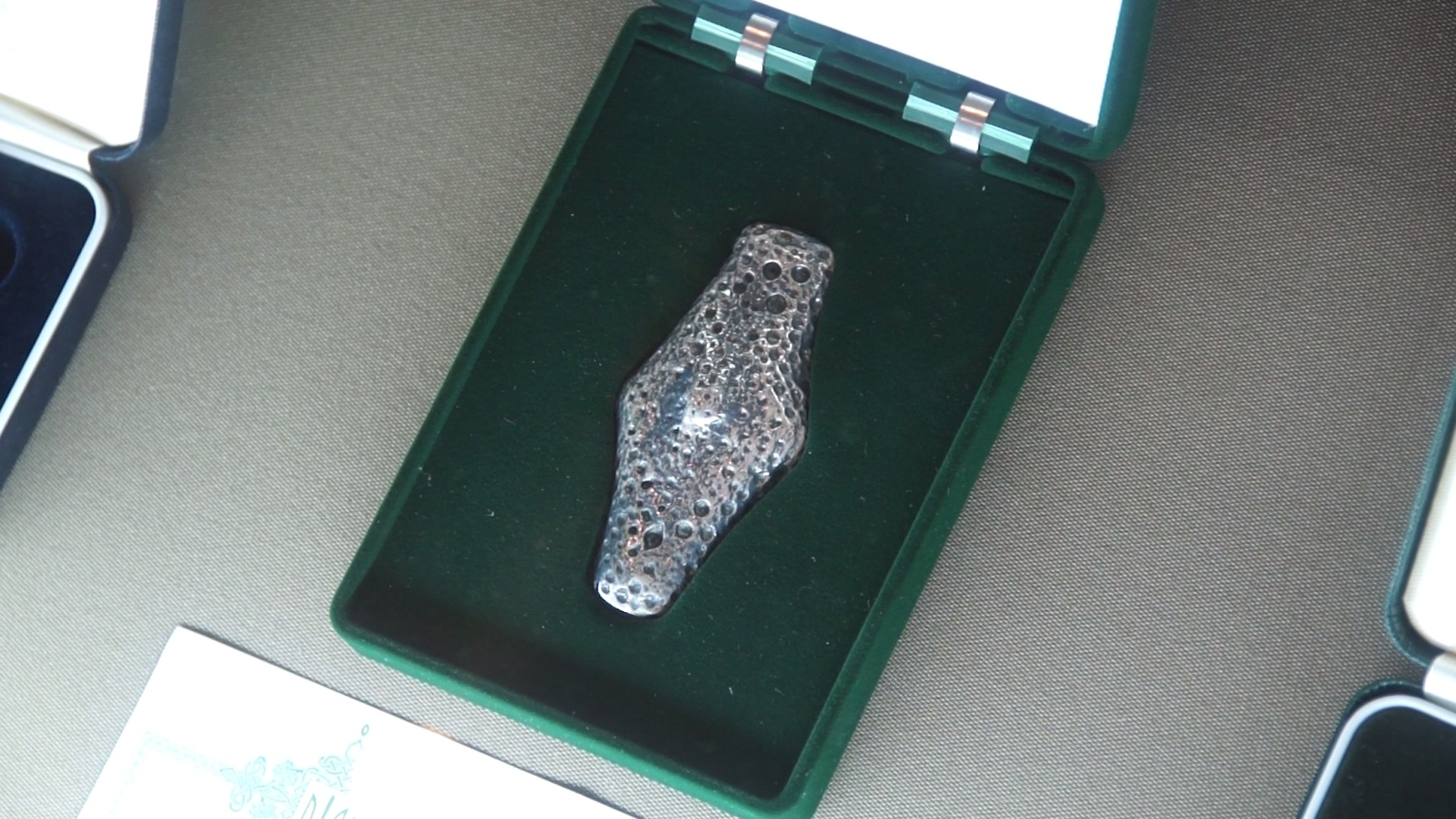
Ancient silver Hryvnia of Kievan Rus'.

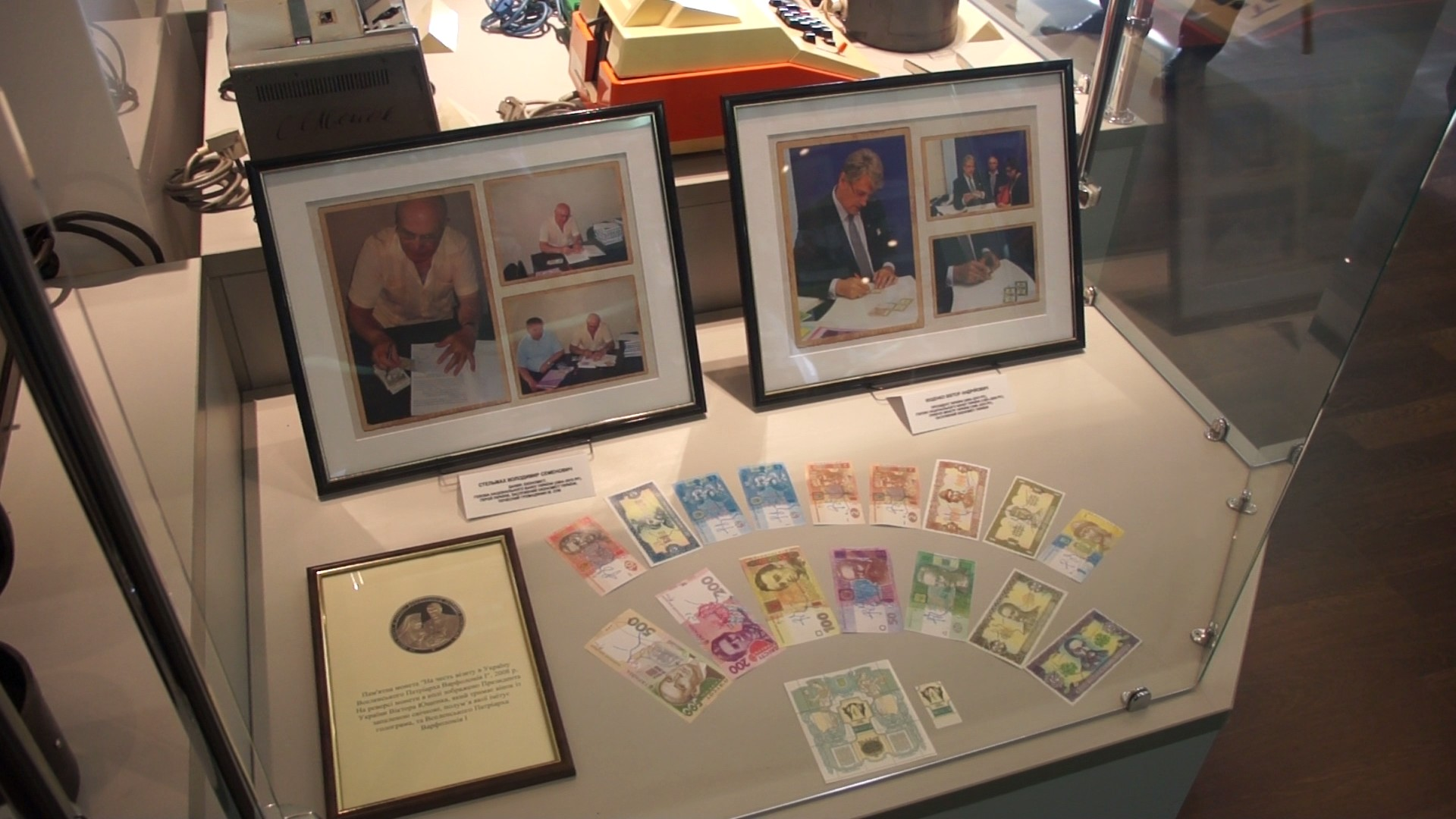
Exposition of well-known personalities in finance and banking.

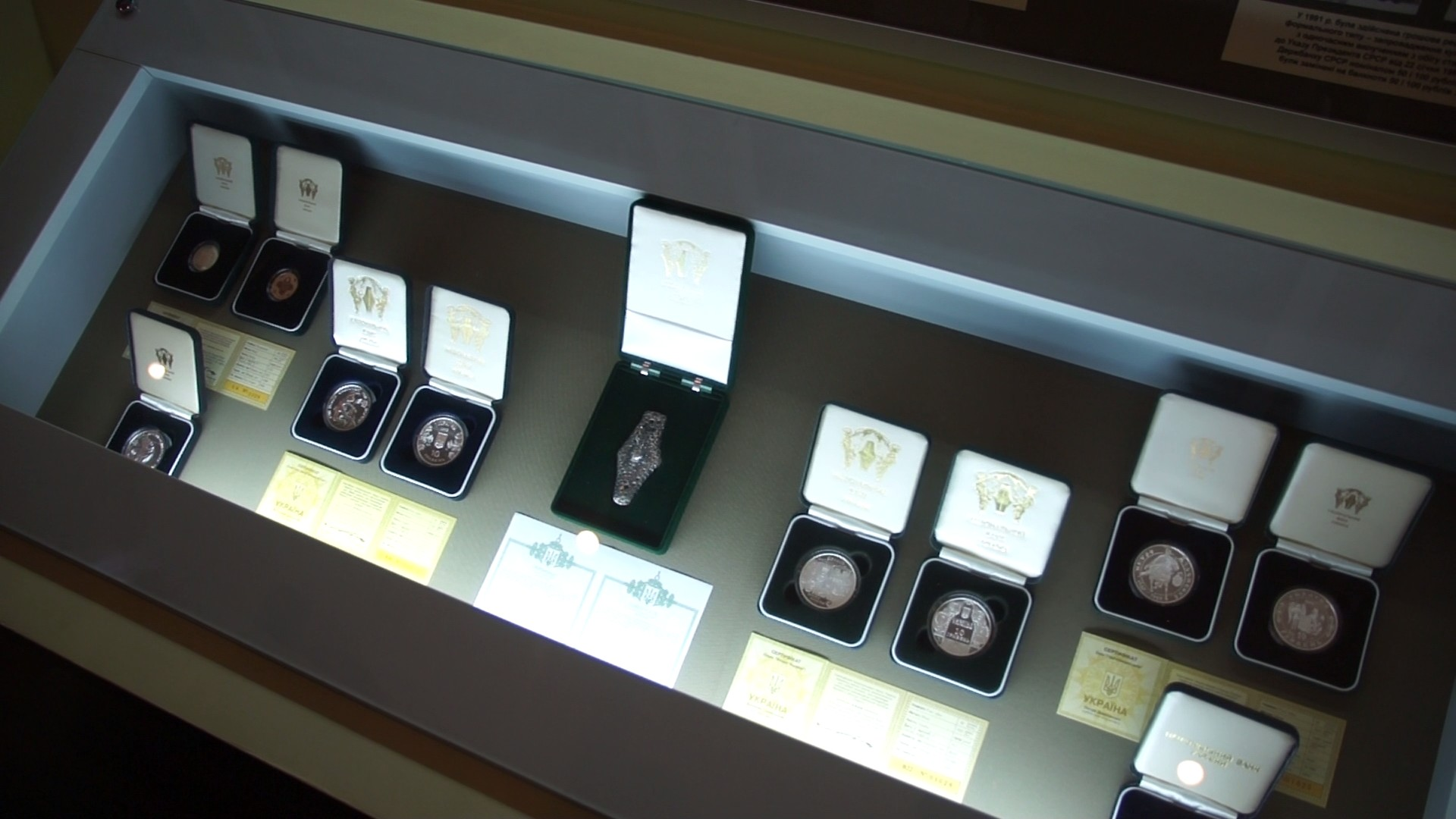
Metal money (coins, souvenir bars), commemorative medals of the National Bank of Ukraine.

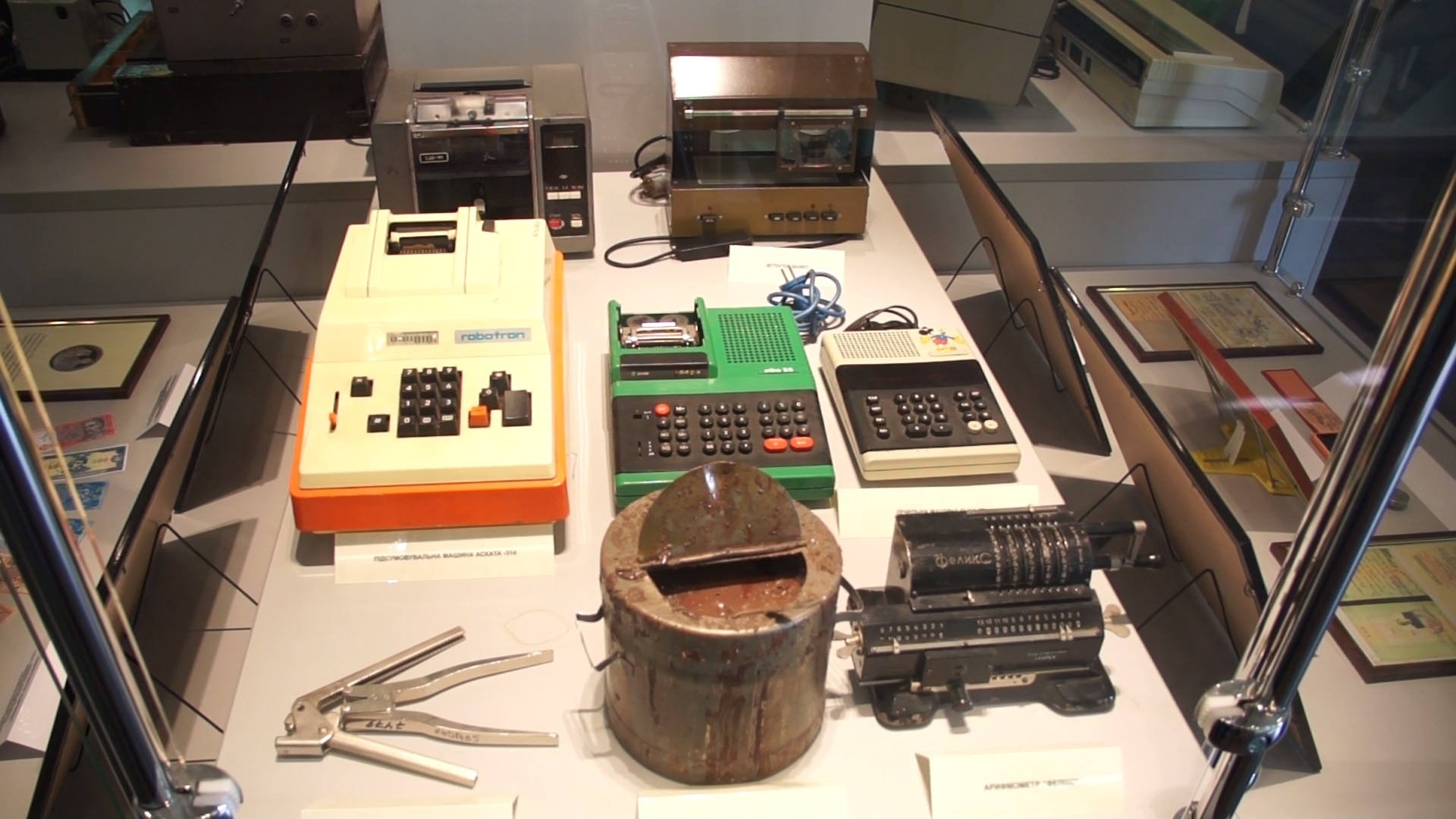
Technical appliances used in the Ukrainian banking industry in the late 20th century.

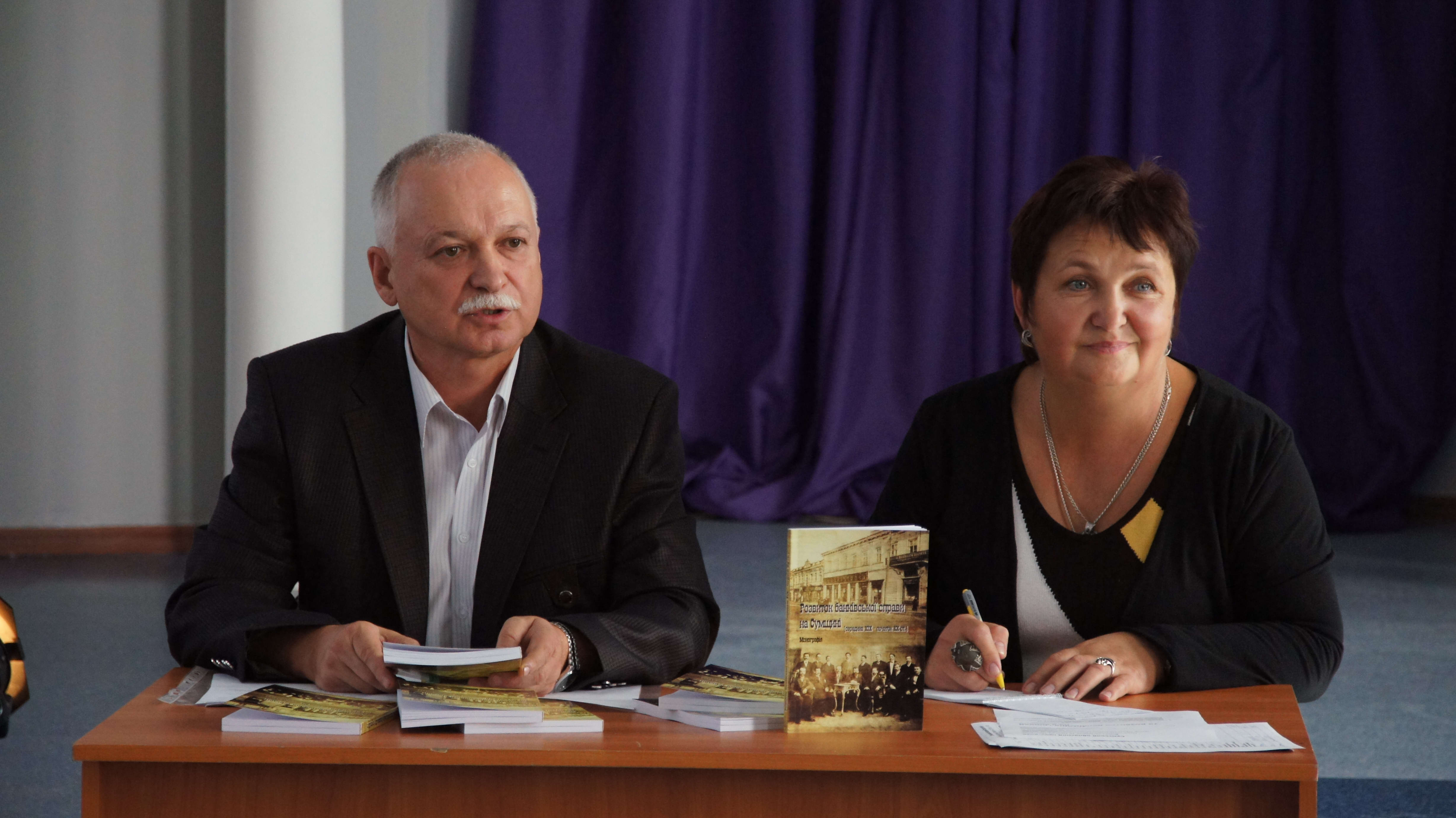
Presentation of the monograph "Development of Banking in the Sumy Region (mid-19th to 20th centuries)" by Serhiy Tyhenko, curator of the museum.

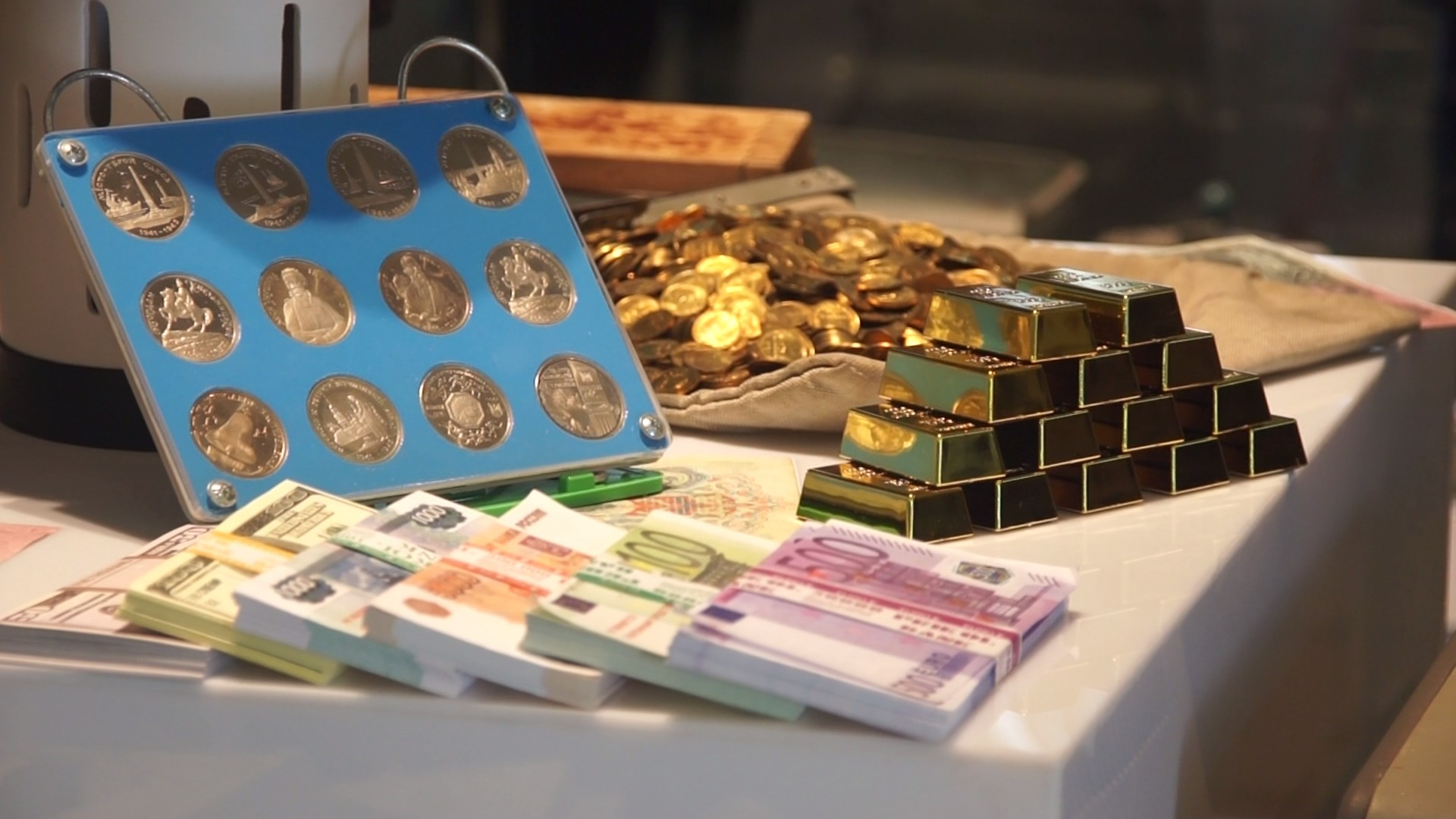
Modern Ukrainian paper money, coins & souvenir bars.

The museum conducts excursions in two thematic areas:

"Development of Banking in the Sumy region" – historical overview covering the period from the Russian Empire of the Queen Catherine II, when in 1785 she issued "the Charter to Russian towns", which allowed the establishment of banks in urban areas. The first bank on the territory of the Sumy region appeared in 1865 in the town of Romny. Visitors can view a lot of historical documents and an extensive photo archive of the 19th and 20th centuries. Special attention is given to well-known personalities of the region in finance and banking:

- Alexiy Alchevsky a merchant, industrialist, banker, founder of the Mutual credit society, the Kharkiv land bank and the Kharkiv commercial bank;
- Mikhail Tereshchenko, entrepreneur, philanthropist and financier, the first finance minister of the USSR, the man who saved the Austrian bank "Credit Anshtalt" from bankruptcy and annexation by Hitler's Germany;
- Grigori Sokolnikov, economist, commander of the army, the first Commissar in Finance of the USSR;
- Volodymyr Stelmakh, banker, economist, Governor of the National Bank of Ukraine (2000-2003), (2004-2010), Honorary Citizen of Sumy, Honorary Professor of the Ukrainian Academy of Banking;
- Viktor Yushchenko, financier, public and political figure, Prime Minister of Ukraine (1999-2001), President of Ukraine (2005-2010), Head of the National Bank of Ukraine (1993-1999), Honorary Professor of the Ukrainian Academy of Banking.

"The history of money and the national currency" – an exposition of the museum dedicated to the history of money, especially the money of independent Ukraine. During the gathering of exhibits a considerable assistance was provided by the National Bank of Ukraine, which gave the academy a large collection - from the earliest to modern money, from ancient metal coins to souvenir money and commemorative medals of the National Bank of Ukraine.

In 2013, the academy’s research center together with the Museum of the Academy published a monograph "Development of Banking in the Sumy Region (mid-19th to 20th centuries)".
