= Ukrainian Academy of Banking of the National Bank of Ukraine =

Public university in Sumy, Ukraine

Coordinates: 50°54′20″N 34°47′44″E

State higher educational institution "Ukrainian Academy of Banking of the National Bank of Ukraine"
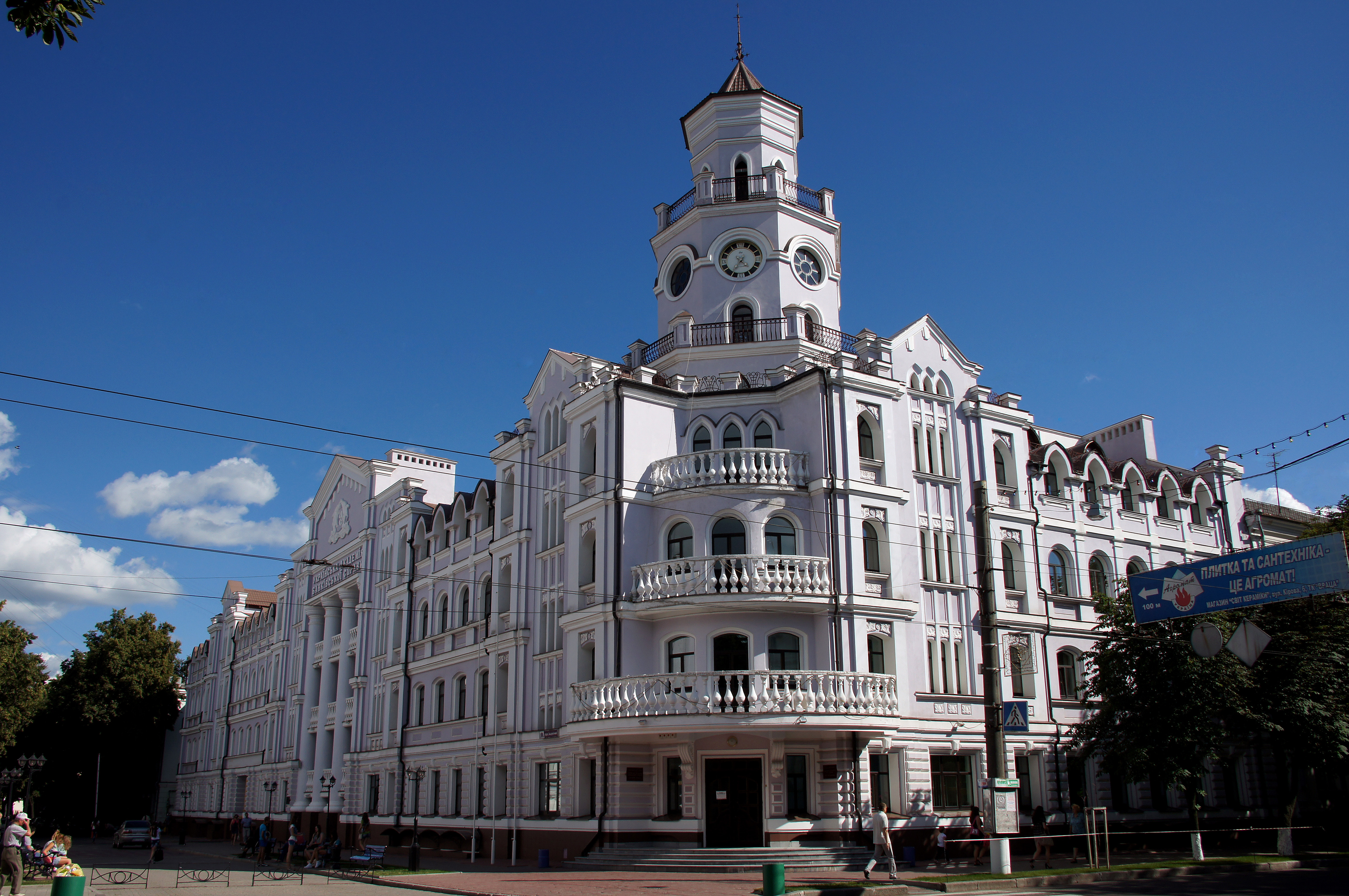
- The main building of the academy
- Abbreviation: SHEI "Ukrainian Academy of Banking"
- Formation: 12 February 1996
- Type: State Higher Educational Institution
- Location: Ukraine, Sumy, Petropavlivska str. 57
- Members: 2,000 students
- Acting rector: Doctor of Economic Sciences, Professor Serhiy Kozmenko
- Affiliations: National Bank of Ukraine, Ministry of Education and Science of Ukraine
- Staff: Doctors of Sciences - 22, Professors - 17, Phd - 126, Assistant Professors - 95
- Website: www.uabs.edu.ua

Ukrainian Academy of Banking of the National Bank of Ukraine is a state-owned higher educational institution. It was incorporated into Sumy State University in 2015, having been under the control of the National Bank of Ukraine before that date. It is located in Sumy, Ukraine.

The academy offers degrees in economics and law.

== History ==
The Ukrainian Academy of Banking was founded on 12 February 1996 according to the decree of the Cabinet of Ministers of Ukraine. With the support of the National Bank of Ukraine, the academy created a material and technical base of the European type for the training of students: three educational buildings with a total area of 35,000 square metres (380,000 sq ft). It includes two fully renovated historical buildings for the Law Faculty, Faculty of Banking Technologies and the Faculty of Accounting and Finance. The academy's telecommunication systems and network technologies include computer equipment, software and hardware, electronic turnstile gates, new telephone communication systems, an open Wi-Fi network and other projects.

== Academy’s logo ==
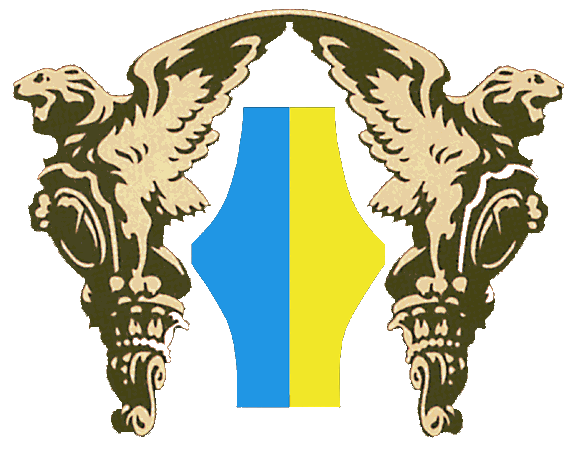
Logo of the National Bank of Ukraine

In the center of the academy's logo is the Hryvnia (large silver ingot or bar which served as a monetary unit in the ancient Kievan Rus' and in Eastern Europe). The Hryvnia is surrounded by 4 letters "УАБС" – a Ukrainian abbreviation of "the Ukrainian Academy of Banking". At the top of the logo is a coat of arms of the town Sumy in the form of three bags. At the bottom of the logo is the year of the academy's foundation – 1996. On both sides of the logo there are Griffins - mythical winged creatures with the body of a lion, who are supposed to search, find and protect treasures. The logo of the National Bank of Ukraine also has the Hryvnia surrounded by Griffins. Thus, the academy is a treasure of the town Sumy, which is under the auspices of the National Bank of Ukraine.

== Faculties, departments and structural subdivisions ==
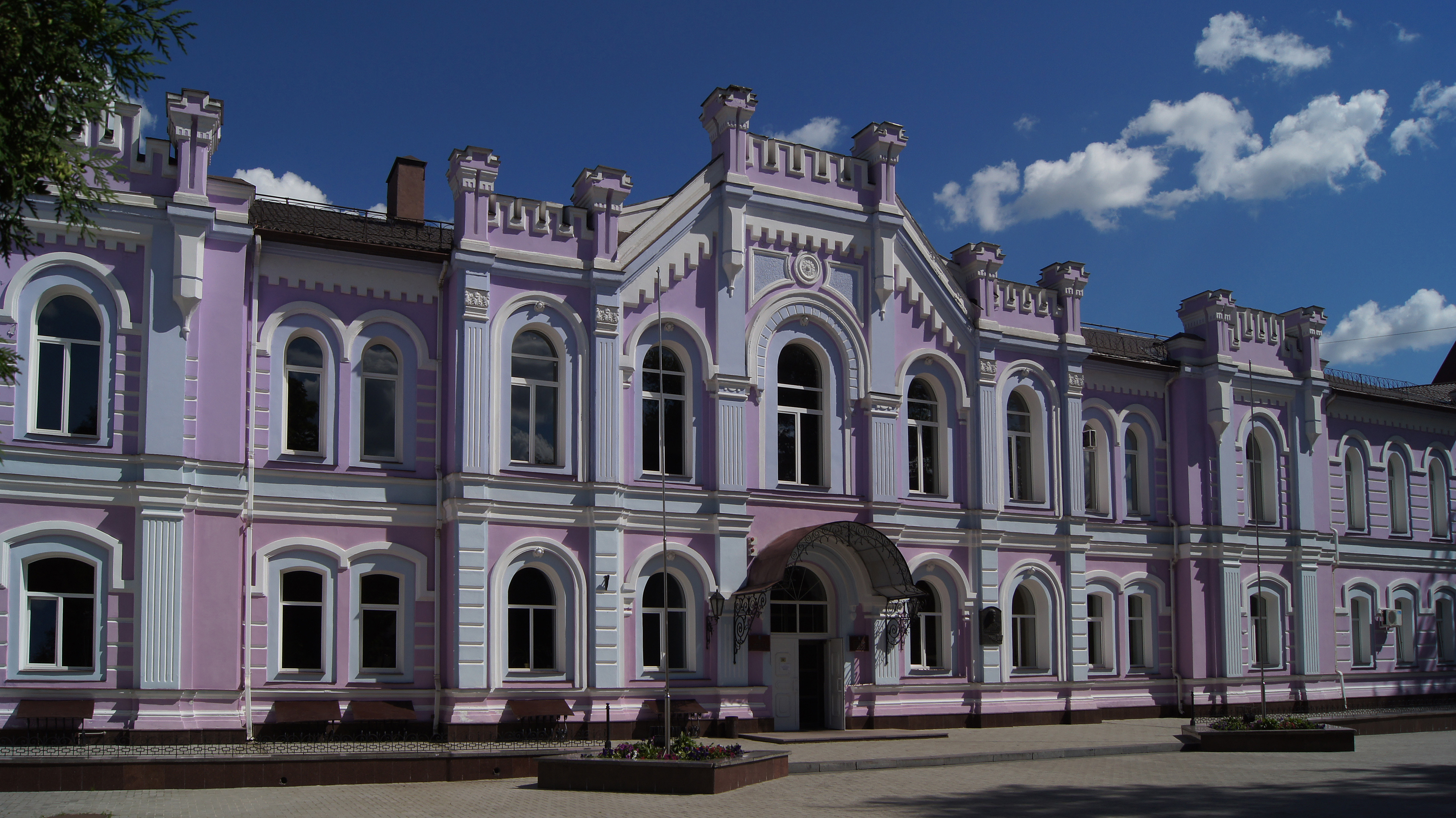
Building of the Law Faculty

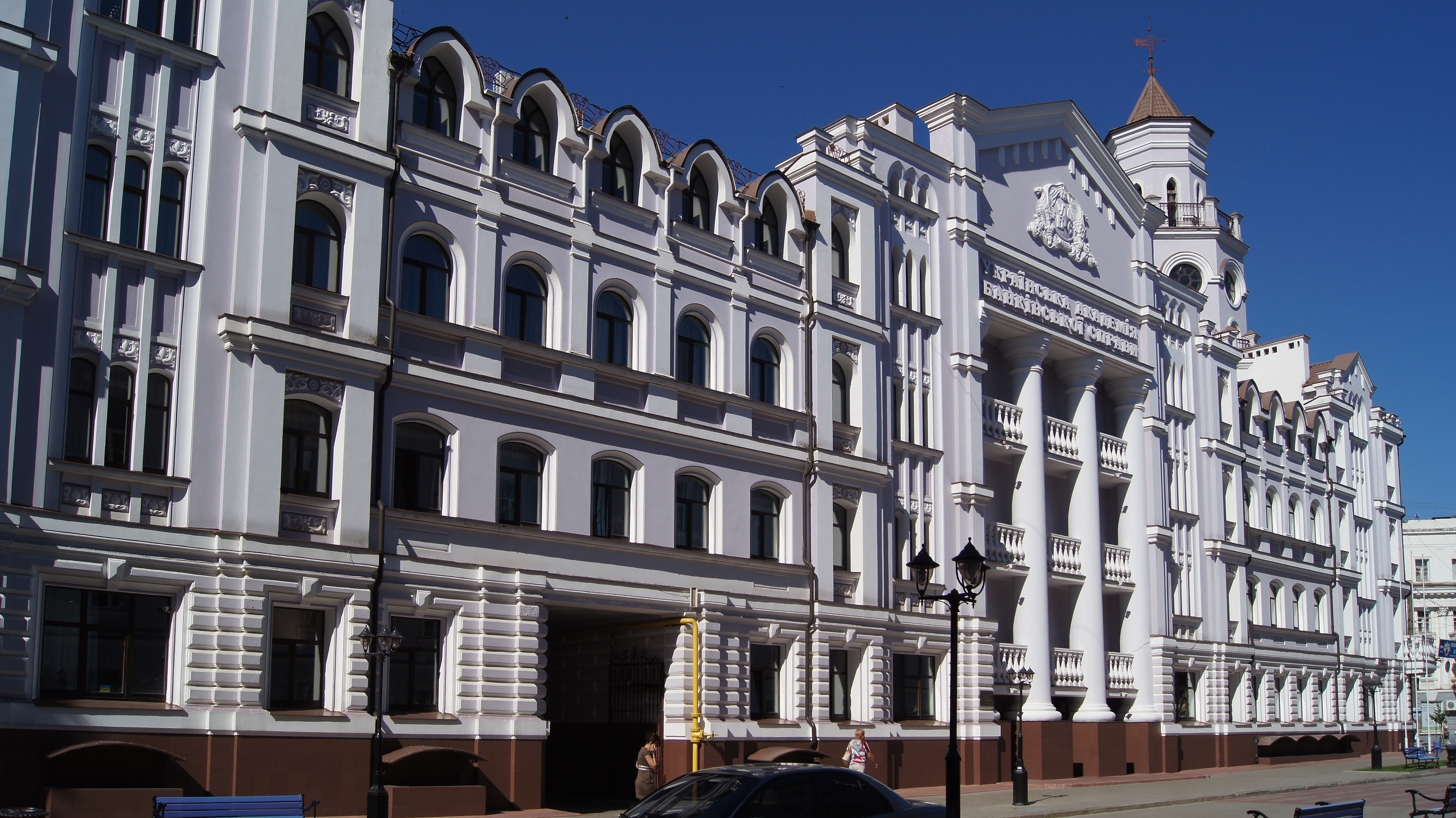
Building of the Faculty of Finance and Accounting

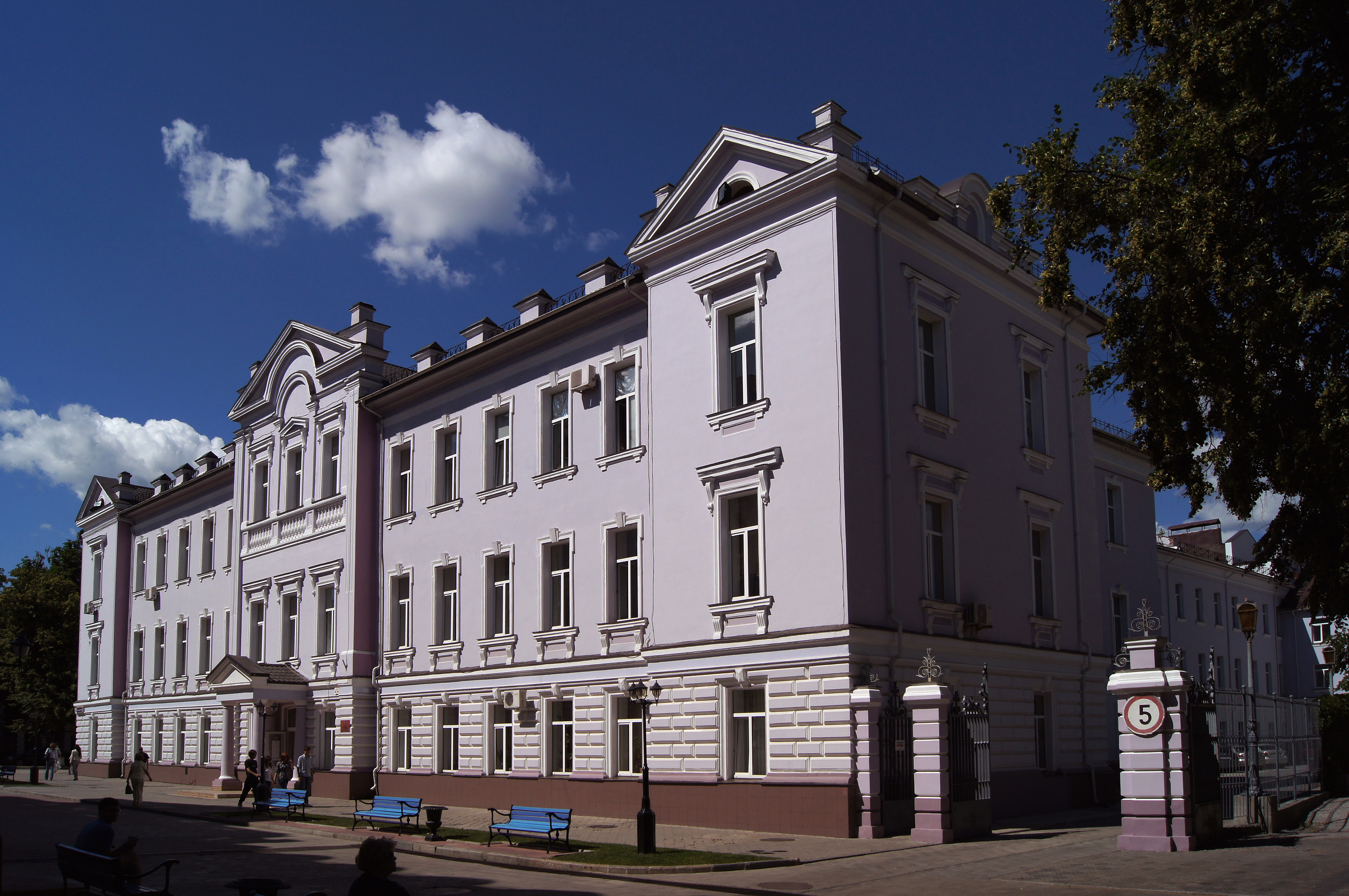
Building of the Faculty of Banking Technologies

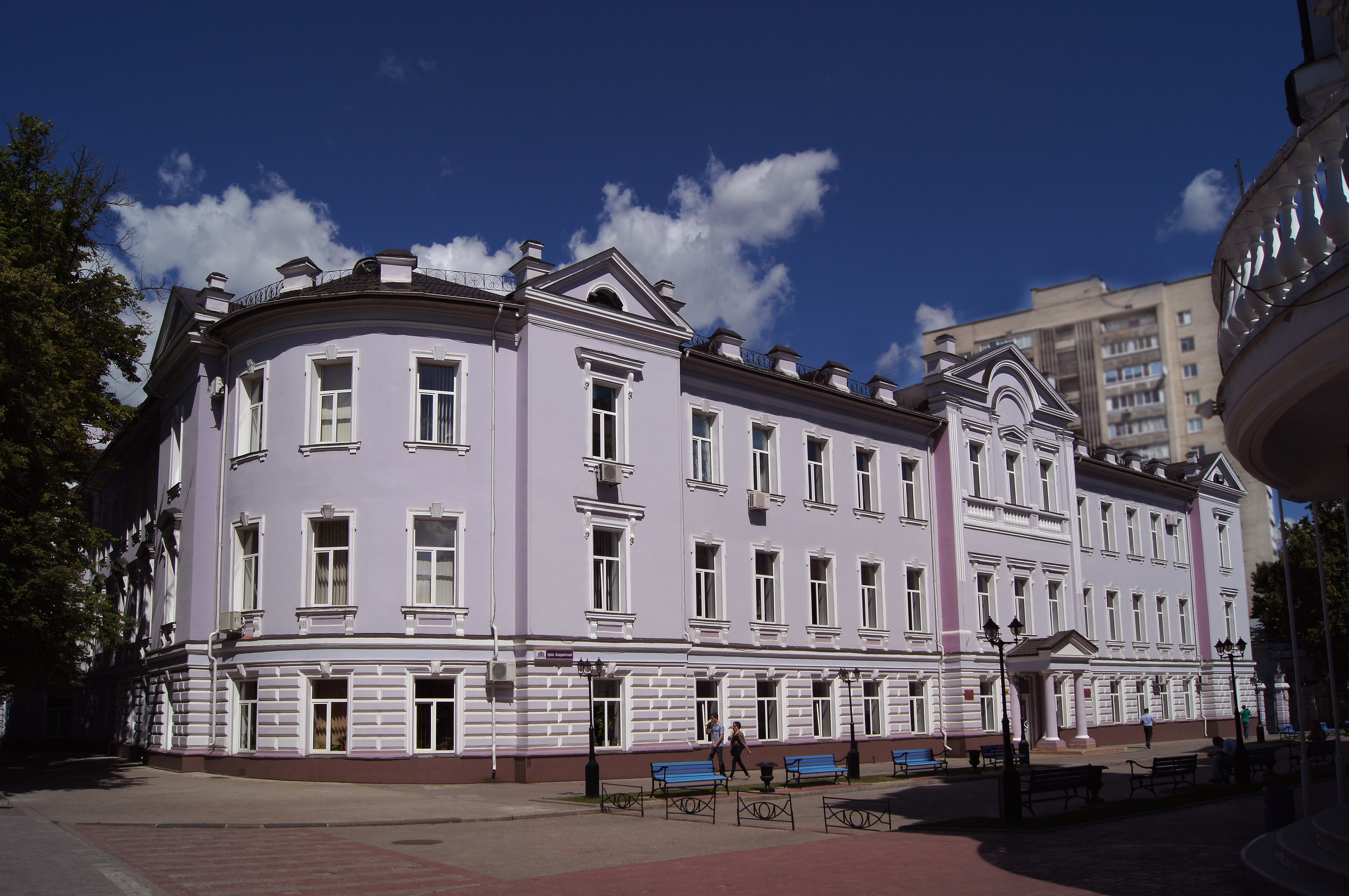
Building of the Faculty of Banking Technologies

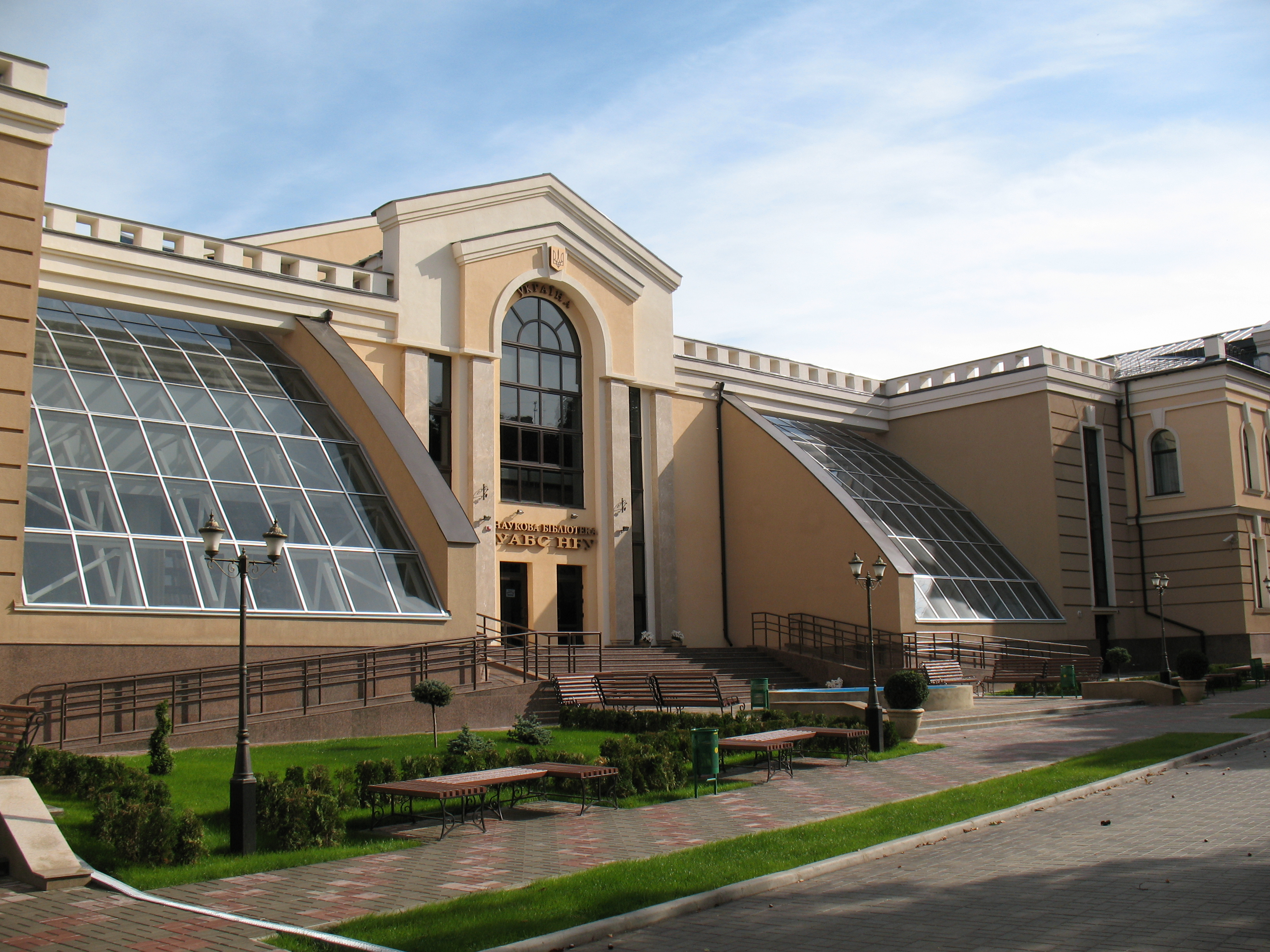
Building of the Scientific Library

Building of the Universal Athletics Center

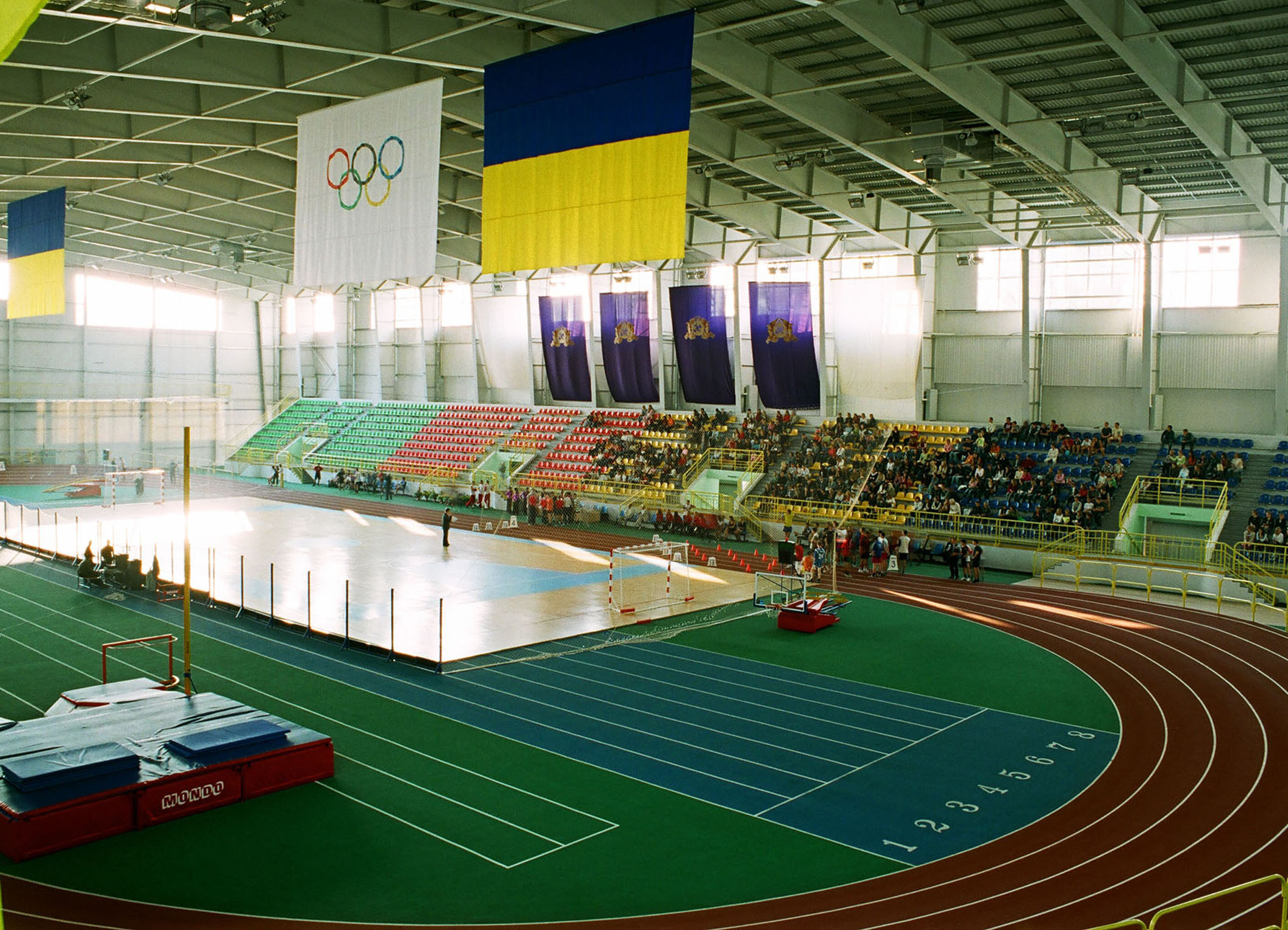
Inside of the Universal Athletics Center

Building of the "Olympic" Hotel

The structure of the Ukrainian Academy of Banking includes three faculties:

- Law Faculty – trains law specialists (with specialization in banking and economics).
- Faculty of Banking Technologies – trains specialists in the following fields: “Banking”, “International Economics” and “Economic Cybernetics”.
- Faculty of Finance and Accounting – trains specialists in the fields of "Accounting and Audit", "Finance and Credit" and "Management of financial and economic security".

Each faculty trains specialists according to a degree system of education: bachelor, specialist and master degrees. Such system contributes to the effective training of modern banking specialists and ensures the continuity and quality of education.

The training is conducted by 14 departments: Banking, Finance, Accounting and Audit, Management, Theoretical and Applied Economics, Economic Cybernetics, Higher Mathematics and Computer Science, International Economics, State Law, Civil and Banking Law, Criminal Law, Humanities, Foreign Languages, Physical Training.

The educational process is organized with the use of modern educational technologies. They include practical training at the bank "AkademBank", the specialized class-room of dealing operations, the training company, internet center, Networking Academy CISCO, etc.

The academy has corresponding structural subdivisions, which ensure its educational, scientific, organizational, cultural and educational activities.

In 2009 was opened the Scientific Library of the Ukrainian Academy of Banking. Its area is 8,030 sq.m. The academy's library is a multifunctional educational, informational, scientific and socio-cultural center, with a stock 145 thousand copies. Its users have 200 seats and 140 automated workstations. The library has implemented modern radio-frequency technologies for customer servicing. The Polish- Ukrainian Сenter and the European Union Information Center function on the basis of the library.

The academy has its own medical center, with 11 doctors, physiotherapy, massage, diagnostic and infusion suites, as well as the rooms of functional and ultrasound diagnostics, a therapeutic swimming pool and a medical laboratory. There are first-aid medical centers at the hostels and educational buildings for students and staff.

The academy's sports and recreation complex includes a Universal Athletics Center with a total area of 11586 sq.m., which by the Decree of the Cabinet of Ministers of Ukraine was granted the status of an Olympic training center, and an "Olympic" Hotel. There are 11 gyms, a swimming pool, tennis court and specialized sports grounds.

Students from other towns are provided with three hostels, all of which are linked to the Intranet (local network). Each educational building and hostel has functioning canteens and buffets, gyms and sports facilities. For students’ recreation there is a Students' Park.

The academy has its own information and publishing department, which publishes scientific conference reports, monographs, educational textbooks and manuals.

== Student life ==
The life of the academy's students is filled with scientific, cultural and sport events.

The Ukrainian Academy of Banking has a youth scientific sector and 29 research circles functioning at the departments. All-Ukrainian scientific student conference "Problems and development prospects of Ukraine's financial system: a look into the future" is annually held the academy. Students win prizes in the national competitions and conferences; receive scholarships from the National Bank of Ukraine, the Cabinet of Ministers of Ukraine, and the Sumy Oblast State Administration.

The academy has student clubs, in which young journalists get involved in the publication of the student newspaper "AkadeMix" and the activities of the student TV studio "Zachet TV", while poets meet in the literary club "Waves of words". Students take part in the activities of the volunteers club, dramatic actors perfect their skills in the theatrical studio "Kurazh". Very popular among students is a club of intellectual games, debating society “Dumka”, student Team of the Funny and Inventive "Cartouche" and other creative associations.

The academy offers opportunities for students’ self-realization in sport: a professional athletics arena, 11 gyms, a modern swimming pool, tennis courts, sports grounds, sports club of "Volodymyr Holubnychy", women's futsal team of the Ukrainian Academy of Banking, and 20 sport clubs. On a regular basis the academy organizes competitions for the "Cup of the Rector of the Ukrainian Academy of Banking" in different kinds of sports: mini-football, basketball, volleyball, handball, table tennis, bench press, swimming and others. Among the academy's students there are many sports stars – champions of the World, Europe and Ukraine, champions of the World Student Games, winners of other prestigious competitions, including:

Polina Rodionova - archer, world champion in archery (13–20 October 2013, Wuxi, China), silver medalist of the World Indoor Archery Cup (25 February - 3 March 2014, Nimes, France), Champion of Europe (15–21 July 2013, Bucharest, Romania);

Vita Semerenko - biathlon bronze medalist of the XXII Olympic Winter Games in Sochi (2014), five-time winner of the World Championships in biathlon, the World Cup winner, five-time European champion in biathlon, participant of the 2010 Olympic Games in Vancouver;

Yevhen Hutsol – track and field athlete, participant of the World Championship in track and field athletics (March 7–9, 2014, Sopot, Poland), where he set a new national record of Ukraine (3,08,79).

== Achievements and awards ==
According to the rating of the Academy of Sciences and Higher Education of Ukraine the Ukrainian Academy of Banking is among the top ten of the country's economic universities. According to the rating of universities "Top 200 Ukraine" the academy is included in the list of top 200 universities in Ukraine as evidenced by its awards:

- 2000 – the academy joined the top 10 of the best economic universities in Ukraine and received a diploma in the rating of popularity and quality "Rating of higher educational institutions of Ukraine - 2000".
- 2001 – the academy became the prize-winner of the International Academic Rating of popularity and quality "Golden Fortune".
- 2002 - At the International fair of educational institutions “Modern education in Ukraine – 2002” the academy was awarded with the silver medal and the diploma “For considerable contribution to the development of the national educational system”.
- 2003 - the academy was awarded with the gold medal by the Physical education and Sports Committee of the Ministry for education and sciences of Ukraine for the considerable contribution to physical training and sports development.
- 2004 - At the VII International fair of educational institutions “Modern education in Ukraine – 2004” the academy was awarded with the bronze medal for “Significant contribution to the modernization of the national educational system” in the nomination “Innovative pedagogical technologies in the educational process”.
- 2005 – the academy was awarded with the bronze statuette for being one of the best National institutions of higher education.
- 2006 – the academy won the Cup of the Ukrainian Student Sport Association and was awarded with the Honorary Diploma of the Committee for Physical Education and Sport of the Ministry of Education and Science of Ukraine for the organization of physical education and sport at higher educational institutions.
- 2007 – the academy received a Transitional Cup for awarding the best athletes from the President of Ukraine, Viktor Yushchenko.
- 2008 - the academy won in the regional contest “100 top Ukrainian products” in the nomination: “Rendering of educational services” and received awards among 115 best Ukrainian enterprises, businesses, organizations and institutions of higher education.
- 2010 - In 2010, the Ukrainian Academy of Banking received a prestigious award - a statuette and diploma for winning the All-Ukrainian competition "NSMEP - 10 Steps to Success" in the nomination "Special Award of the National Bank of Ukraine for the contribution to the project "Electronic Student Card".
- 2011 - the academy became the winner of All-Ukrainian competition "The best university for the training of specialists in the banking and financial sector - 2011" in the nomination "The best university according to the quality of retraining of specialists for the banking and financial sector in Ukraine".
- 2012 - the academy received the award of the all-Ukrainian competition "The best university for the training of specialists in the banking and financial sector - 2012" in the nomination "The best university according to the quality of training and retraining of banking employees".
- 2013 – the academy became the winner of the third All-Ukrainian competition "The best university for the training of specialists in the banking and financial sector according to the “Banker” magazine" in the nomination "The best university for the training of graduate and doctoral students".
- 2014 – the academy was awarded with a silver medal and diploma in the category "Activities of educational institutions in the development of international cooperation" and received a diploma "For the achievements in innovative modernization of the national education"] at the Fifth International Exhibition "Modern Educational Institutions - 2014".

== Scientific activity ==
Scientific activity of the academy is determined by the priorities of the National Bank of Ukraine.

The academy publishes several professional journals in economics and philosophy approved by the Higher Attestation Commission of Ukraine:

- Scientific journal Bulletin of the Ukrainian Academy of Banking (twice a year)
- Scientific journal Legal Bulletin of the Ukrainian Academy of Banking (twice a year)
- Collection of scientific works Problems and development prospects of the banking system of Ukraine (twice a year)
- Collection of scientific works World Outlook - Philosophy - Religion (twice a year)

Every year the academy organizes scientific and practical conferences, which have become traditional:

- International scientific and practical conference "International banking competition: theory and Practice"
- All-Ukrainian scientific and practical conference "Problems and prospects of the banking system of Ukraine"
- All-Ukrainian scientific and practical conference "Problems and development prospects of the financial system of Ukraine: a look into the future"
- Interuniversity conference "Modern picture of the world: the integration of scientific and non-scientific knowledge"
- International scientific and practical conference of students and young scientists "Human rights in the modern state: theoretical and practical aspects"
- International Scientific and Practical Conference of Students and Young Scientists "Human rights in the modern state: Theoretical and Practical Aspects"
- International scientific conference "New spiritual dimensions at the beginning of the 21st century"
- International scientific and practical conference "Actual problems of the legal regulation of financial and credit relations"

There is a specialized academic council for the evaluation of candidate and doctor's dissertations in the speciality 08.00.08 – money, finance and credit.

Since 2011 the academy has a functioning Scientific and Methodological Seminar of Young Scientists "Application of mathematical methods in the study of economic problems". The academy has a "Scientific centre of initiative youth", which contributes to the development and realization of students’ scientific interests and their creative abilities. Electronic scientific journal "Youth Research Bulletin of the Ukrainian Academy of Banking of the National Bank of Ukraine" is published twice a year in 4 series: "Legal sciences", "Economics", "Humanities" and "Special issues". Since 2012 the academy has been promoting the activities of the "Council of Young Scientists" — a youth organization that brings together students, young lecturers and scientists of the academy.

== Academy’s international ratings ==
- Webometric Ranking of World Universities "Webometrics". The academy is in the "Top-50 of Ukrainian universities".
- International citation database "Scopus". Four international economic journals represented by the academy's teaching staff are included in Scopus:
1. "Investment Management and Financial Innovations";
2. "Problems and Perspectives in Management";
3. "Corporate Ownership and Control";
4. "Corporate Board: role, duties and composition".
- Rating of scientific journals of the Polish Ministry of Science and Higher Education. International economic journal "Problems and Perspectives in Management" was included in the annual ranking of scientific journals of the Ministry of Science and Higher Education of Poland.
- International rating agency "Expert RA". The academy was included into the shortlist containing 195 universities of the CIS countries. It was assigned to the rating category "E", which indicating a high, acceptable and adequate levels of student training.

== International activities ==
The academy cooperates with more than 40 educational institutions abroad specializing in economics, finance, banking and management, in particular, with the University of Applied Sciences of the Deutsche Bundesbank (Hachenburg, Germany), the Poznan School of Banking (Faculty in Chorzów, Poland), Olsztyn University of Computer Science and Economics (Poland), the Banking Institute of Prague (Czech Republic), the School of Business and Economics of the Linnaeus University (Sweden), Heilbronn University (Germany), Moscow Banking School of the Bank of Russia, International Training Center for Bankers (Budapest, Hungary), Belgrade Banking Academy (Serbia), Forum for company Law and Financial Market Law (FOCOFIMA) research centre at the University of Copenhagen Law Faculty (Denmark), Belarusian State Economic University (Minsk, Belarus), Financial University with the Government of the Russian Federation (Moscow, Russia), Saint Petersburg State University of Economics and Finance (Russia), the National Research University “Higher School of Economics” (Moscow, Russia), etc.

There are two international research centers functioning at the academy:

International Centre for Banking and Corporate Governance, headed by the Doctor of Economic Sciences, Professor of the Department of International Economics Alex Kostyuk. The Center consists of 63 scholars from 26 countries, 7 post-graduate students and the best students of the academy.

The Centre has implemented the following international scientific and educational projects of the academy:

- On-line conference "Corporate governance in banks" (2010-2011);
- International Conference "Managing the way out of crisis: between regulation and forecasts" held at the ESCEM School of Business and Management (France) (2011);
- Conference of Young Scientists "Financial markets and corporate structures: globalization during the crisis" (2011);
- International Conference "Improving financial institutions: the proper balance between regulation and governance" held at the Hanken School of Economics (Helsinki, Finland) (2012);
- International Conference "Corporate Governance and Regulation: Outlining New Horizons for Theory and Practice" held at the University of Pisa (Pisa, Italy) (2012);
- International scientific and practical conference "International banking competition: theory and practice" (2012-2013);
- International scientific and practical conference "Governance and control in banking and finance: a new paradigm for risk and performance" held at the School of Business of the "ISTEC" University (Paris, France) (2013);
- International Conference "Financial Distress: Corporate Governance and Financial Reporting Issues" held at Link Campus University (Rome, Italy) (2013);
- Post-graduate students exchange projectof with the Linnaeus University (Växjö, Sweden) (since 2012);
- Double Degree Program with the Linnaeus University (Växjö, Sweden) (2013);
- Double Degree Program with Link Campus University (Rome, Italy) (since 2014).

International Center for scientific research of the theory and practice of insurance, headed by the Doctor of Economic Sciences, Professor Olga Kozmenko.

The result of the work of the center's authors is a scientific articles, monographs, textbooks, including:

- “4Ps of insurance companies’ marketing" - Sumy, 2014. - ISBN 978-966-680-702-4
- “The behavior of insurance companies on the investment market: the experience of Ukraine and Germany" / / Bulletin of the National Bank of Ukraine.- 2013.
- “New vectors of the insurance market of Ukraine" - Sumy, 2012. - ISBN 978-966-680-616-4
- “Actuarial calculations: textbook" - Sumy, 2011. - ISBN 978-966-680-588-4
- “Insurance and reinsurance markets in the era of globalization" - Sumy, 2011. - ISBN 978-966-680-610-2
- “Social security system in the context of the current economic and demographic trends" - Sumy, 2011. - ISBN 978-966-680-573-0
- “The ratings of insurance companies and the calculation of insurance rates based on the use of economic and mathematical methods" - Sumy, 2008. - ISBN 978-966-8958-37-3

== Museums and art projects ==
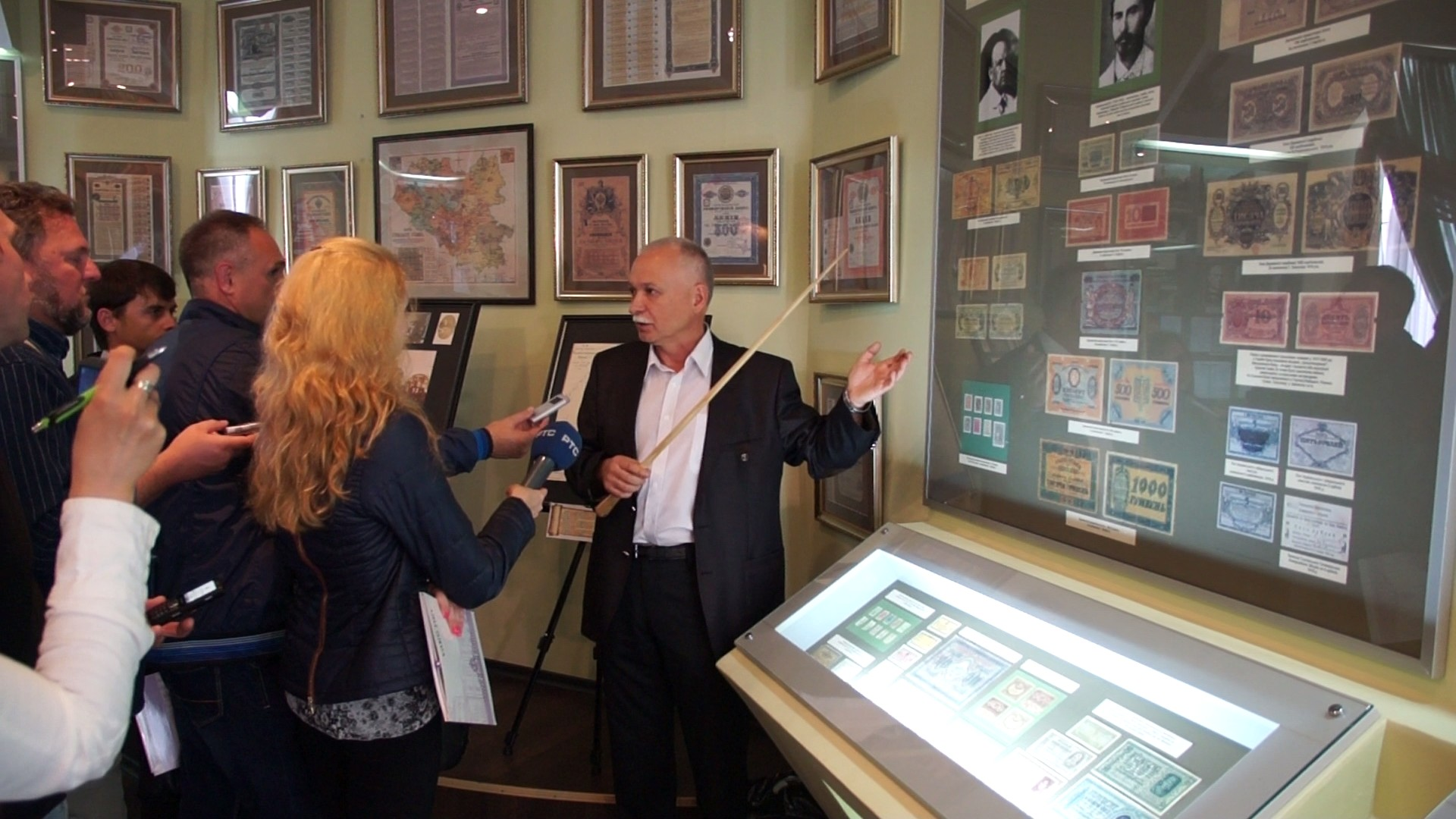
Presentation of the updated exposition at the "Museum of Banking history in the Sumy oblast and the History of Ukrainian Money"

- Art Gallery Akademichna was founded in 1998. It has organized over 100 exhibitions, in which viewers were introduced to more than 1500 works of fine and decorative art. Today, the academy's art collection includes the paintings and graphics of artists from Ukraine, Croatia, Poland and Switzerland. Head of the gallery - Assistant Professor of the Department of Humanities, member of the National Union of Artists of Ukraine Serhiy Pobozhiy.
- AkademArt Gallery is a gallery of contemporary art founded in 2013. It is a venue for exhibitions of Ukrainian and foreign artists and photographers, masters of contemporary art (such as installation, land art, performance, sound and video art, etc.); creative meetings and popular lectures by representatives of art and culture; sessions with participants of the academy's performance studio. The gallery's curator – Rimma Mylenkova, Candidate of Pedagogical Sciences, Associate Professor of the Department of Foreign Languages, Head of the Performance Studio of the Ukrainian Academy of Banking, director of the Sumy oblast art center "Danchenko studio".
- Museum of Banking history in the Sumy oblast and the History of Ukrainian Money was founded in 2006. This is a special museum, which received from the National Bank of Ukraine a unique collection of bonds out of circulation. The exposition of the bonds is arranged in the thematic-chronological order - from the first appearance of money to the present days. In addition to the numerous historical documents, photographs, metal money (coins, souvenir bars), commemorative medals of the National Bank of Ukraine there is an exhibition presenting technical appliances used in the banking industry in the late 20th century. The museum's exhibition is regularly updated with new historical exhibits - photographs, securities, and personal paraphernalia of bankers. The curator of the museum - Associate Professor, Research Fellow of the Scientific Centre of the academy Serhiy Tyhenko.
- The Museum of electronic and office equipment was founded in 2013. It presents the computer technology development in the world and in Ukraine. The exhibition has samples of the first technical equipment that were used in the educational process: different models of calculators, the first computers such as "Iskra 1030M", "Poisk 2", BK- 0010 and others. The first training technical machinery from film-viewing devices to overhead projectors is on display. Viewers can also see various types of telephones and tape machines; different types of digital media - magnetic tapes, punched cards, slides, filmstrips, CDs . The curator of the museum - Methodologist, Head of the Laboratory of the Department of Economic Cybernetics Victor Burega.
- The Museum of the Sukhanov family was founded in 2010. This is an exhibition located in the scientific library of the academy. It displays the material related to the life and charitable activities of the well-known entrepreneurs and philanthropists, the Sukhanovs, who made outstanding contributions to the development of Sumy in the second half of the 19th and early 20th centuries.
- The project Banks of the Sumy region was founded in 2011. This is a research work devoted to the study and classification of information on the activities of banks in the Sumy oblast, their history, operations and personal data.
- The program "Chair" on AcademTV was launched in 2008. This is a platform for unbiased and frank discussions with the guests of the studio about the history of higher educational institutions, their major structural units - departments, the achievements and challenges. Initiator and anchorman - Doctor of Economic Sciences, Professor Serhiy Kozmenko.
- Art Workshop "Ukrainian Avant-Garde: History. Names. Events was launched in 2013. This is a cultural project aimed at introducing students to the Ukrainian avant-garde art of the 1910-1920s and Ukrainian visual art practices.
- International open-air painting sessions were initiated in 2011. They are a series of annual international open-air painting sessions, which include artists from Ukraine and Poland. They are carried out both in the picturesque places of the Sumy oblast and in the Polish town of Gliwice.
- Art project "Budetlyanin David Burliuk was launched in 2007. This is a series of cultural events dedicated to 125th anniversary David Burlyuk - "the father of Ukrainian and Russian Futurism". The project involves the joint open-air painting sessions of Ukrainian and Polish artists, the study of artistic heritage of D. Burlyuk with the participation of researchers from Japan, organization of student contests dedicated to the life and works of D. Burlyuk, exhibitions of the works of artists taking part in the project.
