= Transformers: Revenge of the Fallen (disambiguation) =

Transformers: Revenge of the Fallen is a 2009 science-fiction film.

Transformers: Revenge of the Fallen may also refer to:

- Transformers: Revenge of the Fallen (video game)
  - Transformers Revenge of the Fallen: Autobots
  - Transformers Revenge of the Fallen: Decepticons
- Transformers: Revenge of the Fallen – The Album
- Transformers: Revenge of the Fallen – The Score

== See also ==
- Transformers (disambiguation)
