= Light side =

Light side is the portion of the Earth or other planetary body, characterized by light that faces in the direction of sunlight/starlight defined by the terminator line.

Light side or Light Side may also refer to:

- The "light side of the Force" in the Star Wars universe, an inherently good power wielded by Jedi
- The Light Side, a 2008 record in the album Greatest Hit (...And 21 Other Pretty Cool Songs)
- Dark Side, Light Side, a 1996 album

== See also ==
- Dark side (disambiguation)
- The Bright Side (disambiguation)
