= The Bright Side =

Bright Side or The Bright Side may refer to:

- The English language idiom "Look on the bright side"

== Music ==
- Bright Side (album), a 2014 album by OBB
- The Bright Side (Lenka album), a 2015 album by Lenka
- The Bright Side (Meiko album), a 2012 album by Meiko
- "Bright Side", a 2016 song from the album Aurora by Vicetone featuring Cosmos and Creature
- "The Bright Side", a 2023 song by Collar
- "The Bright Side", a 2018 song from the album I Like Fun by They Might Be Giants

== Other ==
- Bright Side (YouTube channel), operated by TheSoul Publishing
- The Bright Side (film), a 2020 Irish film
- The Bright Side (painting), an 1865 oil painting by Winslow Homer of three African American Union Army teamsters

== See also ==
- Light side (disambiguation)
- Sunnyside (disambiguation)
- Dark side (disambiguation)
