= James Fortune =

American musician, songwriter, and producer

- Born: November 29, 1978 (age 47); Richmond, Texas, U.S.
- Genre: Urban contemporary gospel
- Occupations: Songwriter, record producer, singer, radio host
- Years active: 2004–present
- Labels: FIYA World; Light; eOne; Black Smoke Worldwide
- Website: jamesfortunemusic.com

James Fortune (born November 29, 1978) is an American gospel music recording artist, songwriter and producer. He is also a radio personality on 1190 AM WLIB.

== Music career ==
He was born in Richmond, Texas, U.S.

James Fortune & FIYA's debut CD, You Survived, was released in September 2004. He was honored at the 19th annual ASCAP Rhythm and Soul Music Awards for his hit single "You Survived" off the same album. "You Survived" also peaked as the No. 2 most played Gospel song in the country and has remained in the Top 7 for three years. The radio single, "God Can" features Micah Stampley and Zacardi Cortez. Fortune received a 2006 ASCAP Writers Award for "You Survived". FIYA has been nominated four years in a row for the Texas Gospel Youth & Young Adult Choir of the year.

Fortune and F.I.Y.A.'s second project on Black Smoke Music World Wide, The Transformation, was released January 22, 2008. The first single, "I Trust You", charted at No. 1 on Gospel radio for 25 weeks and No. 30 on Urban AC charts and No. 1 at WLIB in New York City.

In 2012, Fortune was nominated for two Grammy Awards for Best Gospel Album of the Year and Best Gospel Song of Year, and topped Billboard's "Best of 2012 Gospel Songs/Artists List".

In 2014, Fortune released his first live album, Live Through It. The album was recorded in Atlanta, Georgia, in front of an audience of 5,000 people. On a BET episode of Lift Every Voice, host, CoCo Brother interviewed Fortune and discussed "I Trust You".

On March 3, 2023, Fortune released "Trusting God", a collaboration with singer Monica.

== Radio career ==
In 2013, James Fortune became the evening host on 1190 AM WLIB, which was acquired by Emmis Communications in February 2014. He is on-air Mondays through Fridays from 7 pm to 9 pm.

== Legal troubles ==
In 2003, James Fortune pleaded guilty to felony injury to a child and received six years deferred adjudication. According to a civil lawsuit, Fortune burned his stepson leaving the boy disfigured with severe burns over nearly 50% of the child's body. In October 2014, Fortune was arrested in Fort Bend County, Texas, after a heated dispute with his wife, Cheryl Fortune, and was charged with aggravated assault of a family member. Fortune was later released on $20,000 bail.

== Discography ==
- You Survived (2004)
- The Transformation (2007)
- Encore (2010)
- I Believe: Live (2010)
- Identity (2012)
- Grace Gift (2012)
- Live Through It (2014)
- Dear Future Me (2017)
- Dream Again (2019)
- Dream Again (Live from Rock City) (2020)
