= Dark side =

Dark side, Dark Side, or Darkside may refer to:

== Popular culture ==
- Dark side (Star Wars), the dark side of the Force in the Star Wars universe
- Dark Side (video game), a 1988 video game from Incentive Software
- The Dark Side (book), a 2008 book by Jane Mayer
- The Dark Side (magazine), a UK horror film publication
- Darkside (novel), a 2007 children's novel by Tom Becker
- Darkside, a horror novel by Dennis Etchison
- Darkside (radio play), a 2013 drama by Tom Stoppard, based on Pink Floyd's album The Dark Side of the Moon
- Darkside, Scottish professional wrestler known for winning the ICW World Heavyweight Championship (Scotland)
- The Darkside (film), anthology film directed by Warwick Thornton
- Red: The Dark Side, a 2007 Indian film
- "Dark Side" (The Incredible Hulk), a 1980 television episode

== Music ==
- Darkside (band), an American electronica duo
- The Darkside (band), a British indie band
- Darkside, a subgenre of grime
- Darkside, name for the genre sometimes also called Darkcore

=== Albums ===
- The Dark Side (DarkSun album), 2007
- The Dark Side (Gregorian album), 2004
- Darkside (Necrophobic album), 1997
- Darkside (Tim Minchin album), 2005
- Darkside / Stay Awake or the title song, an EP by Kisschasy, 2004
- The Darkside Vol. 1, by Fat Joe, 2010
- The Darkside Vol. 2, by Fat Joe, 2011
- The Darkside III, by Fat Joe, 2013
- The Dark Sides, by King Diamond, 1988
- No More Heroes Sound Tracks: Dark Side, from the video game No More Heroes, 2008
- "The Dark Side", disc one of the Dream Theater album Greatest Hit (...And 21 Other Pretty Cool Songs), 2008

=== Songs ("(The) Dark Side") ===
- "Dark Side" (Blind Channel song), 2021
- "Dark Side" (Kelly Clarkson song), 2012
- "Dark Side" (Phoebe Ryan song), 2017
- "Dark Side" (R5 song), 2016
- "The Dark Side" (song), by Muse, 2018
- "Dark Side", by Erich Church from The Outsiders, 2014
- "Dark Side", by The Shadows of Knight, 1966

=== Songs ("Darkside") ===
- "Darkside" (Alan Walker song), 2018
- "Darkside" (Blink-182 song), 2019
- "DARKSIDE" (Neoni song), 2021
- "Darkside", by Bring Me the Horizon from Post Human: Nex Gen, 2024
- "Darkside", by Crazy Town from The Gift of Game, 1999
- "Darkside", by Lil Wayne from Funeral, 2020
- "Darkside", by Lindsey Stirling from Artemis, 2019
- "Darkside", by Shinedown from Attention Attention, 2018
- "Darkside", by Ty Dolla Sign and Future from Bright: The Album, 2017
- "DarkSide", by Zara Larsson from Allow Me to Reintroduce Myself, 2013

== Other uses ==
- The Dark Side (Seattle Seahawks), a nickname for the Seattle Seahawks defense during their 2025 season
- DarkSide (dark matter experiment), an affiliation of physicists searching for dark matter
- DarkSide (hacker group), a hacking group responsible for ransomware attacks.
- The night portion of a planetary body, defined by the terminator line

== See also ==
- Darksidea, a genus of fungi
- Darksyde, a ship in the Beast Wars television series
- Darkseid, a DC Comics supervillain
- Dark Side of the Moon (disambiguation)
- The Dark Side of the Sun (disambiguation)
- The Bright Side (disambiguation)
- Light side (disambiguation)
- Shadyside (disambiguation)
