= Misery Loves Comedy =

Studio album by Louis Logic and J.J. Brown
- Released: June 13, 2006
- Studio: 5G Studios (Brooklyn, NY)
- Genre: Hip hop
- Length: 1:00:20
- Label: Fat Beats
- Producer: J.J. Brown

Louis Logic chronology
Alcohol/Ism (2004)	Misery Loves Comedy (2006)	Look on the Blight Side (2013)

J.J. Brown chronology
Misery Loves Comedy (2006)	Connect the Dots (2009)

Singles from Misery Loves Comedy
- 1. "The Great Divide" Released: 2006

Professional ratings
Review scores
Source	Rating
AllHipHop	3.5/5 stars
AllMusic	4.5/5 stars
HipHopDX	3.5/5
IGN	8.5/10
PopMatters	5/10
RapReviews	7.5/10

Misery Loves Comedy is a collaborative studio album by American rapper Louis Logic and hip hop record producer J.J. Brown. It was released on June 13, 2006 via Fat Beats. Recording sessions took place at 5G Studios in Brooklyn. Entirely produced by J.J. Brown, who also served as executive producer together with Jim Mahoney, it features a lone guest appearance from Marisa Croce. It was supported with the only single "The Great Divide" b/w "Captain Lou El Wino".

The album focusses on Logic's experiences with women, however, the title hints at the poor outcomes of these ventures.

== Track listing ==
All tracks are written by Louis Dorley, except track 7 written with Jason Brown.

No.	Title	Length
1.	"New Leaf"	3:14
2.	"Captain Lou El Wino"	4:53
3.	"The Line"	4:19
4.	"Beginner's Lust"	3:52
5.	"Rule by a Fool"	4:02
6.	"All Girls Cheat"	4:21
7.	"The Withdrawal Method"	4:49
8.	"A Perfect Circle" (featuring Marisa Croce)	6:28
9.	"Classy McNasty"	3:42
10.	"The Great Divide"	3:57
11.	"Up to No Good"	4:01
12.	"Morning After Pill"	4:12
13.	"Misery Loves Comedy"	8:30
Total length:		1:00:20

Deluxe Edition bonus tracks
No.	Title	Length
14.	"The Great Reprise"	3:41
15.	"The Line" (Remix)	4:18
16.	"Bully" (Remix)	4:34
17.	"Up to No Good (Remix)" (featuring Homeboy Sandman)	5:42
18.	"New Leaf" (Instrumental)	3:17
19.	"The Line" (Instrumental)	3:50
20.	"Beginner's Lust" (Instrumental)	3:22
21.	"Rule by a Fool" (Instrumental)	3:35
22.	"All Girls Cheat" (Instrumental)	3:35
23.	"The Withdrawal Method" (Instrumental)	4:28
24.	"Classy McNasty" (Instrumental)	3:48
25.	"The Great Divide" (Instrumental)	4:01
26.	"Up to No Good" (Instrumental)	3:31
27.	"Morning After Pill" (Instrumental)	3:12
28.	"Misery Loves Comedy" (Instrumental)	3:17
29.	"Bully (Remix)" (Instrumental)	4:33

Notes

- Track 13 contains a hidden track "The Great Reprise" that starts after 8 seconds of silence after "Misery Loves Comedy" (4:45) bringing the total time for track 13 to 8:30.

== Personnel ==
- Louis "Logic" Dorley – songwriter, vocals, recording
- Jason "J.J." Brown – songwriter (track 7), producer, recording, executive producer
- Mark Rufino – bass (track 4)
- Marisa Croce – vocals (track 8)
- Dan Maier – recording, mixing
- Gene Grimaldi – mastering
- Jim Mahoney – executive producer
- Joshua "Dust La Rock" Prince – art direction, design
- Zach Johnson – illustration
- Adam Amengual – photography
- Ethan Holben – A&R
- Gabe Kahn – booking
