= Transform =

Transform may refer to:

== Arts and entertainment ==
- Transform (scratch), a type of scratch used by turntablists
- Transform (Alva Noto album), 2001
- Transform (Howard Jones album) or the title song, 2019
- Transform (Powerman 5000 album) or the title song, 2003
- Transform (Rebecca St. James album), 2000
- Transform (single album), by Teen Top, or the title song, 2011
- "Transform", a song by Daniel Caesar from Freudian, 2017
- "Transform", a song by Your Memorial from Redirect, 2012

== Mathematics, science, and technology ==
=== Mathematics ===
- Transformation (function), concerning functions from sets to themselves
- Transform theory, theory of integral transforms
  - List of transforms, a list of mathematical transforms
  - Integral transform, a type of mathematical transform

=== Computer graphics ===
- Transform coding, a type of data compression for digital images
- Transform, clipping, and lighting, a term used in computer graphics

=== Other sciences ===
- Transformation (genetics), the process where a gene or genes are added to an organism's genome
- Transform fault, in geology, a fault which runs along the boundary of a tectonic plate

== Organizations ==
- Transform Holdco, the parent company of Sears and Kmart
- Transform (consulting firm), an American management consulting company
- Transform (organization), an organization focusing urban planning issues in San Francisco, United States
- Transform (political party), a British political party

== Other uses ==
- Samsung Transform, an Android smartphone manufactured by Samsung

== See also ==
- Transformation (disambiguation)
