= Sin-A-Matic =

Studio album by Louis Logic
- Released: July 15, 2003
- Recorded: March 2002
- Genre: Hip-hop
- Label: Solid Records; Demigodz Records
- Producer: J.J. Brown, Celph Titled, The Avid Record Collector, Cimer Amor, Memo, Louis Logic, King Honey

Louis Logic chronology
Sin-A-Matic (2003)	Alcohol/Ism (2004)

Professional ratings
Review scores
Source	Rating
RapReviews.com	8/10 stars

Sin-A-Matic is an album by Louis Logic, an American hip-hop artist. The album's title does not refer to the porn film company Sin-A-Matic, but rather it is a play on words. Logic says that the album is supposed to be a "visual ride that presents itself the way a movie would without picture." The album's title sounds like the term "cinematic" referring to cinema, however he included the word "sin" to account for the uglier tales of the album.

== Track listing ==
Track listing
Title	Performer(s)	Producer(s)	Sample(s)
"Sintro"	Louis Logic	J.J. Brown
"Street Smarts"	Louis Logic	J.J. Brown
"Freak Show"	Louis Logic	Celph Titled
"Celph Hatred"	Louis Logic; Celph Titled	The Avid Record Collector
"Diablos"	Louis Logic; Celph Titled	J.J. Brown	The Doors - Spanish Caravan (Waiting For The Sun; Elektra 1968)
"Dos Factotum"	Louis Logic	J.J. Brown	Bob James - I want to thank you (very much) (Touchdown; Columbia 1978)
"Coochie Coup"	Louis Logic; Fienza Jollie	J.J. Brown	Letta - Kukuchi (appearing on David Axelrod's "1968 To 1970 An Anthology" released in 1999 on Stateside Records)
"Postal"	Louis Logic	J.J. Brown
"Mischievous"	Louis Logic	Celph Titled
"Halfway Stretch (Sinterlude)"	Louis Logic	Cimer Amor
"Best Friends"	Louis Logic; Apathy	The Avid Record Collector
"Revenge!!!"	Louis Logic; Celph Titled	Memo; Louis Logic; Celph Titled; J.J. Brown
"Fair Weather Fan"	Louis Logic	Memo; J.J. Brown
"The Rest"	Louis Logic	J.J. Brown
"The Ugly Truth"	Louis Logic	The Avid Record Collector
"Idiot Gear"	Louis Logic	J.J. Brown Chasing Amy - Dialogue is Sampled	Joe Sample - In All My Wildest Dreams (Rainbow Seeker; ABC Records 1978)
"Dust To Dust"	Louis Logic	King Honey; J.J. Brown; Louis Logic	Boogie Nights(1997)- Dialogue is Sampled
"Let's Get It Started" (bonus track after "Dust To Dust")	Louis Logic	J.J. Brown

== Personnel ==
Contributors
Producers
Producer(s)	J.J. Brown, Celph Titled, The Avid Record Collector, Cimer Amor, Memo, Louis Logic, King Honey
Executive Producer(s)	Matt Slywka, J.J. Brown, Louis Logic
Performers
Lead vocals and rapping	Louis Logic, Celph Titled, Fienza Jollie, Apathy
Additional and background vocals	J.J. Brown
Technicians
Mixing	J.J. Brown, Celph Titled, Kingston Killah, Louis Logic
Mastering	J.J. Brown, Dan Maier, Richard Robinson
Design	David Hohman

== Singles ==
Singles
Cover	Title	B-Side	Release Date
	"Idiot Gear"	"What You Think, What I Know"	November 24, 2003
