= The Transformation (album) =

Studio album by James Fortune & F.I.Y.A.
- Released: March 13, 2007
- Genre: Gospel
- Length: 69:52
- Label: Worldwide Music
- Producer: Kerry Douglas

James Fortune & F.I.Y.A. chronology
You Survived (2004)	The Transformation (2007)	I Believe: Live (2010)

The Transformation is the second studio album by American gospel artist James Fortune and his choir, F.I.Y.A. The album was released on March 13, 2007, via the Worldwide Music Label. The album charted at number 119 on the Billboard 200 and 3 on the Top Gospel Charts. James Fortune released two singles from the album; "I Trust You", which peaked at number 52 on the Top R&B Hip-Hop Singles & Tracks, and "I Wouldn't Know You", which peaked at number 2 on the Top Gospel Songs chart.

== Track listing ==
1. "I Owe All" (featuring Anaysha Figueroa) (4:51)
2. "Follow You" (3:53)
3. "I Trust You" (5:43)
4. "I'm Good" (4:04)
5. "I Need Your Glory" (4:39)
6. "I Need Your Glory" (Reprise) (1:15)
7. "I Wouldn't Know You" (4:28)
8. "The Blood" (6:37)
9. "A New Day" (2:52)
10. "If You Want To" (4:01)
11. "F.I.Y.A." (4:10)
12. "F.I.Y.A." (Reprise)(1:22)
13. "There Ain't Nothing" (6:06)
14. "Great Is the King" (4:09)
15. "Just To Worship" (4:10)
16. "Trade It All" (3:46)
17. "Holy Night" (4:24)

== Charts ==
=== Weekly charts ===
Chart (2009)	Peak position
US Billboard 200	119
US Top Gospel Albums (Billboard)	3
US Top R&B/Hip-Hop Albums (Billboard)	22

=== Year-end charts ===
Chart (2009)	Position
US Top Gospel Albums (Billboard)	12
US Top R&B/Hip-Hop Albums (Billboard)	92

Chart (2010)	Position
US Top Gospel Albums (Billboard)	33
