= Transformers: Robots in Disguise =

Transformers: Robots in Disguise may refer to the following entries in the Transformers media franchise:

- Part of the lyrics of the theme song to the 1984 TV series The Transformers
- Transformers: Robots in Disguise (2000 TV series), Japanese anime television series
- Transformers: Robots in Disguise (2015 TV series), American animated television series
- The Transformers (IDW Publishing), formerly known as Transformers: Robots in Disguise, a comic book line by IDW Publishing

== See also ==
- Robots in Disguise, an English electropunk band
