= Dark Side of the Moon (disambiguation) =

The Dark Side of the Moon is a 1973 album by Pink Floyd.

Dark Side of the Moon may also refer to:

== Film and television ==
- The Dark Side of the Moon (1986 film), a Danish drama
- The Dark Side of the Moon (1990 film), a science-fiction horror film by D.J. Webster
- Dark Side of the Moon (2002 film), a French mockumentary about the Apollo 11 Moon landing
- The Dark Side of the Moon (TV series), a 2012–2018 Russian detective series
- Darkside of the Moon (TV series), a 2024 Hong Kong drama
- "Dark Side of the Moon" (Supergirl), a 2018 television episode
- "Dark Side of the Moon" (Supernatural), a 2010 television episode
- "Dark Side of the Moon", a 2000 episode of Frasier
- "Dark Side of the Moon", a 1998 episode of Silent Möbius

== Literature ==
- The Dark Side of the Moon, a 1976 young adult novel by William Corlett
- Dark Side of the Moon, a 2006 novel by Sherrilyn Kenyon
- The Dark Side of the Moon, a 2000 novel by Martin Suter

== Music ==
=== Artists ===
- The Dark Side of the Moon, a German-Swiss band formed by Melissa Bonny

=== Other albums ===
- The Dark Side of the Moon (2009 album), by the Flaming Lips and Stardeath and White Dwarfs, recreating the Pink Floyd album
- Dark Side of the Moon, a 1972 album by Medicine Head
- Dark Side of the Moon, a 2020 EP by South Korean singer Moonbyul
- The Dark Side of the Moon Redux, a 2023 version of the Pink Floyd album by Roger Waters

=== Songs ===
- "Dark Side of the Moon", a 1999 song by Dune
- "Dark Side of the Moon", a 2010 song by Vin Garbutt from Word of Mouth
- "Dark Side of the Moon", a 2018 song by Lil Wayne from Tha Carter V
- "The Dark Side of the Moon", a c. 2008 brass band composition by Paul Lovatt-Cooper
- "Dark Side Of The Moon", a song in the 2026 Greek Eurovision national final

=== Tours ===
- Dark Side of the Moon Tour, a 1972–1973 concert tour by Pink Floyd
- The Dark Side of the Moon Live, a 2006–2008 concert tour by former Pink Floyd member Roger Waters

=== Stage works ===
- Die dunkle Seite des Mondes (The Dark Side of the Moon), a 2025 opera by South Korean composer Unsuk Chin

== Other uses ==
- Dark Side of the Moon: A Sci-Fi Adventure, a 1998 PC video game

== See also ==
- Far side of the Moon, the portion of the Moon's surface that cannot be directly observed from Earth
- Darkside, a 2013 radio play by Tom Stoppard based on the Pink Floyd album
- "Carolina in My Mind", a 1969 James Taylor song using the phrase
- The Dark Side of the Moo, a 1986 Pink Floyd bootleg album
- Dark Side of the Spoon, a 1999 album by the band Ministry
- A Hill on the Dark Side of the Moon, a 1983 Swedish film
- Dark of the Moon (disambiguation)
- Dark side (disambiguation)
- Lunar phase, the shape of the Moon's sunlit portion as viewed from Earth
- Planetshine, the illumination of an otherwise dark part of a moon by light reflected from its planet
- Moonshot AI, Chinese AI company with its name derived from the album
