= Scientific library of the Ukrainian Academy of Banking =

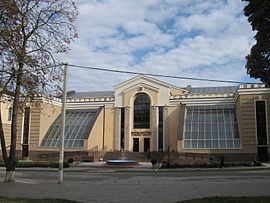
- 50.905563°N 34.795439°E
- Location: Pokrovskaya street, 9/1, Sumy, Ukraine

Collection
- Size: 180,000

Access and use
- Circulation: 10,000
- Population served: 3,500
- Members: 8,000

Other information
- Director: Nadiya Petryna
- Website: lib.uabs.edu.ua

The Scientific library of the Ukrainian Academy of Banking is a library in Sumy, Ukraine that is associated with the National Bank of Ukraine.

== Overview ==
The scientific library of the Ukrainian Academy of Banking is a multifunctional educational, scientific, information and socio-cultural center located in Sumy, Ukraine. The library services over 8,000 students, post-graduates and researchers of the region. Annually, the library is attended by nearly 120,000 readers. 250,000 items are circulated from the library each year. This library has three subscription departments (scientific, educational and literature in foreign languages), three reading-halls, multimedia and internet centers, small a students' creative laboratory, and literary lounge. Some other amenities include meeting rooms for video conferencing, and RFID radio frequency technologies for customer servicing.

The Electronic library of the Academy was created in 2001. This library contains all publications published by the Academy's publishing house. It has its own structure, special sections and collections, chronological storage of data. It is also available on an open electronic archive on the DSpace platform.

== See also ==
- List of libraries in Ukraine
