= Look on the Blight Side =

Studio album by Louis Logic
- Released: November 12, 2013
- Genre: Alternative hip hop
- Length: 37:18
- Label: Fake Four Inc.
- Producer: Louis Logic

Louis Logic chronology
Misery Loves Comedy (2006)	Look on the Blight Side (2013)

Professional ratings
Review scores
Source	Rating
Exclaim!	8/10
Rap Reviews	7/10

Look on the Blight Side is a studio album by American hip hop artist Louis Logic. It was released on Fake Four Inc. in 2013.

== Track listing ==
No.	Title	Length
1.	"A Day Late and a Dollar Short"	5:29
2.	"The Joke's on You"	3:33
3.	"Don't Care"	1:56
4.	"Bet the Farm"	4:35
5.	"They Don't Make 'Em Like They Used To"	3:41
6.	"Chip Off the Old Blog"	3:07
7.	"Look on the Blight Side"	5:06
8.	"Big Fish Eat the Little Fish"	3:45
9.	"Across the Water"	3:50
10.	"Leaving Again"	2:15
