= Business transformation =

Business strategy

Business transformation involves making fundamental changes to how a business is operated in order to adapt to shifts in market environment. This relatively narrow definition overlooks other reasons and rationales. A better understanding is achieved by considering that transformation is a response to factors impacting the performance of the business with management and stakeholders wishing to respond to this by creating new strategies that alter fundamental aspects of the organisation and how it operates. Others describe Business Transformation as "the process of fundamentally changing the systems, processes, people and technology across a whole business or business unit. As such, a business transformation project is likely to include any number of change management projects, each focused on an individual process, system, technology, team or department."

== When business transformation is used ==
The most prominent reasons for business transformation are improved customer satisfaction, increased profitability and to increase market share. Business transformations may involve addressing the organisations value creation options or can be focussed on a specific theme or function within the business, such as adopting agile working methods or workforce transformation. Businesses will often pursue transformation to achieve pre-defined goals, to respond to external challenges (for example market disruption, new market entrants, new regulations coming into force or an increase in market competition), changes in consumer behaviour or supply chain problems. Business transformation can help a company to achieve a strategic goal, such as mergers and acquisitions. Many transformations are digital transformations, where a company uses technological solutions to improve organisational performance. Innovation and digital disruptions can necessitate the need for business transformation and can lead to business failure for companies who do not adapt. A well known example of this is Kodak, who despite inventing the digital camera, failed to change their cameras from film to digital during the 1980s and 1990s.

== Methods to achieve business transformation ==
This management approach may also incorporate business process reengineering (BPR). However application of BPR does not of itself constitute a business transformation, the outcome should be the deciding factor as to whether any activity is truly transformational or simply improvement.

Other methods like Kaizen, Lean or Six Sigma are rooted in incremental improvement rather than paradigm shifts in the way things are done:

- To increase revenue or market share
- To improve customer satisfaction
- To cut costs

Because business transformation typically results in significant changes to how a business operates, many business leaders will use change management techniques to realise the changes that are needed to achieve business transformation. Changes can be met with resistance from employees who wish to main the status quo, change management can therefore help to guide employees through significant changes. Business transformation can sometimes challenge the organisations culture, organisational model and leadership competencies so to be effective at leading such transformation, businesses can utilise a number of change management techniques.

== Components ==
Business transformation is achieved by one or more of: realigning the way staff work, how the organisation is structured, the core product or service portfolio of the business and how technology is implemented and used. Typically organizations go through several stages in transforming themselves:

- Recognising the need to change and gaining consensus amongst stakeholders that change is necessary
- Agreeing what form the change should take, the objectives of the change and a vision that describes a better future
- Understanding what the organisation is changing from and what needs to change in detail
- Designing the new organisational way of working and its support and management
- Testing and implementing changes, usually in waves (this may take place over a number of years)
- Bedding in the change so that the organisation cannot move back to how it was and achieves the intended benefits

Business transformation can lead to developing new competencies and making better use of existing competencies.

== Transformation examples ==
Examples of organisational transformation include:

- General Motors' transformation and restructuring (around 2009). This included consolidating manufacturing facilities, rationalising products, improving the supply chain and implementing lean manufacturing processes. They created a new company and moved the best performing brands and operations into this, to improve financial viability.
- BBC's Delivering Quality First programme (since 2011), which involved productivity savings, reducing content, improving commercially generated income and strategies for working capital savings.
- Argos - Sainsbury's acquired Argos in 2016, allowing Sainsbury's to become a combined grocery and non-food retailer. Sainsbury's began integrating Argos into Sainsbury's stores. Commenting on financial year 2018-2019, Sainsbury's CEO said that most growth had been achieved by integrating Argos into Sainsbury's stores, which led to the closure of many standalone Argos stores, allowing Sainsbury's to achieve an expected £200 million in cost savings. This example shows that competitive advantage from acquisitions is often generated by how the business transforms to successfully integrate, post acquisition.
- Box's pivot from consumer to enterprise (around 2009-2010)
- British Airways' strategic transformation programme in response to low cost airlines (around 2004-2005)
- Netflix's transformation from a DVD company to a streaming service led to subscribers increasing from 7.48 million (2007) to 27.1 million (2012) and an increase in revenue from $997 million (2007) to $3.61 billion (2012) and facilitated international expansion into new markets. By 2020 Netflix were generating £25 billion in revenue, with over 200 million subscribers.
