= Marvin Sapp discography =

- Studio albums: 10
- Compilation albums: 2
- Singles: 11
- Holiday albums: 1

The discography of American gospel musician Marvin Sapp consists of seventeen albums (fourteen of which are studio albums, one of which a Christmas album, and two of which live albums), two compilation albums, an extended play, and seventeen singles. Two of Sapp's records have entered the top-10 on the Billboard 200 chart, fourteen of have entered the top-10 on the Billboard Top Gospel Albums chart, and five titles have topped the chart. He earned noteworthy success in 2008 with mainstream crossover hit "Never Would Have Made It", which reached number 82 on the Billboard Hot 100 chart, and appeared on his seventh studio album, Thirsty. Both releases were certified platinum by the RIAA for shipping at least a million units in the United States. In total, Sapp has been awarded with two BET Awards, a Dove Awards, eleven Stellar Awards, and has been nominated for eleven Grammy Awards.

== Albums ==
=== Studio albums ===
Title	Details	Peak chart positions			Certifications
Title	Details	US	US Gospel	US R&B/HH	Certifications
Marvin Sapp	Released: March 12, 1996; Label: Word Records; Formats: CD, digital download, streaming	—	—	—	
Grace & Mercy	Released: December 16, 1997; Label: Word; Formats: CD, digital download, streaming	—	11	—	
Nothing Else Matters	Released: August 31, 1999; Label: Word; Formats: CD, cassette, digital download, streaming	—	6	—	
I Believe	Released: June 11, 2002; Label: Verity Records; Formats: CD, cassette, digital download, streaming	—	4	62	
Diary of a Psalmist	Released: July 1, 2003; Label: Verity; Formats: CD, cassette, digital download, streaming	—	6	—	
Be Exalted	Released: July 26, 2005; Label: Verity; Formats: CD, digital download, streaming	164	2	41	
Thirsty	Released: July 3, 2007; Label: Verity; Formats: CD, digital download, streaming	27	1	4	RIAA: Platinum
Here I Am	Released: March 16, 2010; Label: Verity; Formats: CD, DVD, digital download, streaming	2	1	1	RIAA: Gold
I Win	Released: April 3, 2012; Label: Verity; Formats: CD, DVD, digital download, streaming	9	1	—	
You Shall Live	Released: June 2, 2015; Label: RCA Inspiration; Formats: CD, digital download, streaming	40	1	—	
Close	Released: September 29, 2017; Label: RCA, Verity, Provident Label Group; Formats: CD, digital download, streaming	156	1	—	
Chosen Vessel	Released: October 9, 2020; Label: Provident/Sony Records; Formats: CD, digital download, streaming	— (Note: Chosen Vessel did not enter the Billboard 200, but peaked at number 66 on the Top Current Album Sales.)	2	—	
Substance	Released: June 10, 2022; Label: Elev8 Entertainment, Thirty Tigers; Formats: CD, digital download, streaming	—	9	—	
"—" denotes a recording that did not chart or was not released in that territory.

=== Compilations ===
Title	Details	Peak chart positions	
Title	Details	US	US Gospel
Beginnings	Released: January 11, 2011; Label: Verity; Formats: CD, digital download, streaming	191	6
Playlist: The Very Best of Marvin Sapp	Released: January 25, 2011; Label: Sony Legacy; Formats: CD, digital download, streaming	141	3

=== Christmas albums ===
Title	Details	Peak chart positions		
Title	Details	US	US Gospel	US Holiday
Christmas Card	Released: October 18, 2013; Label: RCA; Formats: CD, digital download, streaming	— (Note: Christmas Card did not enter the Billboard 200, but peaked at number 183 on the Top Current Album Sales.)	2	13
"—" denotes a recording that did not chart or was not released in that territory.

=== Live albums ===
Title	Details
Then and Now	Released: August 30, 2024; Label: Elev8 Media; Formats: Digital download, streaming
Restoration	Releasing: November 20, 2026; Label: Roc Nation; Formats: CD, digital download, streaming

== Extended plays ==
Title	Details
If I Were and R&B Singer	Released: February 14, 2025; Label: Independent; Formats: Digital download, streaming

== Singles ==
Year	Title	Peak chart positions						Certifications	Album
Year	Title	US	US Adult R&B	US Gospel	US Gospel Air.	US R&B/HH	US R&B/HH Air.	Certifications	Album
2005	"Changed"	—	—	38		—	—		Be Exalted
2006	"Perfect Peace"	—	—	15		—	—		Be Exalted
2008	"Never Would Have Made It"	82	1	1		14	14	RIAA: Platinum	Thirsty
2009	"Praise Him in Advance"	—	—	2		100	—	RIAA: Gold	Thirsty
2010	"The Best in Me"	— (Note: "The Best in Me" did not enter the Billboard Hot 100, but peaked at number 8 on the Bubbling Under Hot 100 Singles chart.)	12	1		14	59	RIAA: Platinum	Here I Am
2010	"He Has His Hand on You"	—	37	4		—	—		Here I Am
2011	"My Testimony"	—	38	1		23	—		I Win
2012	I Belong to You"	—	—	29		—	—		I Win
2013	"Home for Christmas" (featuring Joe)	—	—	19	29	—	—		Christmas Card
2015	"Yes You Can"	—	—	3	1	—	—		You Shall Live
2015	"Live"	—	—	9	6	—	—		You Shall Live
2017	"Close"	—	—	3	4	—	—		Close
2020	"Thank You For It All"	—	—	1	1	—	—		Chosen Vessel
2020	"Undefeated"	—	—	— (Note: "Undefeated" did not enter the Hot Gospel Songs chart, but peaked at number 9 on the Gospel Digital Song Sales chart.)	—	—	—		Chosen Vessel
2022	"All In Your Hands"	—	—	13	1	—	—		Substance
2022	"You Kept Me"	—	—	17	1	—	—		Substance
2025	"Close the Door"	—	—	—	—	—	—		Non-album single
2026	"He's Not Finished"	—	—	8	28	—	—		Restoration
"—" denotes a recording that did not chart or was not released in that territory.
