= Restoration (Marvin Sapp album) =

Live album by Marvin Sapp
- Released: November 20, 2026
- Venues: Chosen Vessel Church (Fort Worth, Texas)
- Genre: Gospel
- Length: 55:48
- Label: Roc Nation
- Producer: Curtis Lindsey

Marvin Sapp chronology
If I Were an R&B Singer (2025)	Restoration (2026)

Singles from Restoration
- 1. "He's Not Finished" Released: August 21, 2026

Restoration is the ninth live album and seventeenth album overall by the American gospel musician and bishop Marvin Sapp. The album was released on November 20, 2026, via Roc Nation, to CD, digital download, and streaming formats. The album is Sapp's first through Roc Nation, as well as Roc Nation's first full-length gospel release. Its ten tracks were produced by Curtis Lindsey; their lyrics were written by Sapp, and composed by Sapp alongside Lindsey, Gus Lacy, and Stan Jones. Restoration was supported by the release of one preceding single, "He's Not Finished", on August 21, 2026. The song peaked at number 8 on the Billboard Hot Gospel Songs chart.

== Release ==
Restoration became Sapp's first multi-song release since his independently-released secular R&B extended play, If I Were an R&B Singer, on February 14, 2025, and his first full-length album since the release of Then and Now on August 30, 2024. The album was announced by Billboard on June 28, 2026. A release date was not announced, though it was scheduled for release in fall 2026. "He's Not Finished" was set for release on August 21 as the album's lead single, and was made available for pre-order. Upon release, the song was supported by a music video, which was uploaded to YouTube on release. To promote the song, it was debuted with a live performance at the 2026 Stellar Awards ceremony.

On October 7, 2026, the album's release date was announced, and Restoration was made available for pre-order. Upon the album's official release, a concept video for album track "Never Let Me Go" was released and uploaded to YouTube. Restoration was promoted with the Restoration Experience Tour. Beginning at the New Jerusalem Church in Jackson, Mississippi, and ending at Word of Deliverance in Cincinnati, Ohio, the tour visited ten locations within the United States and lasted from November 10–19, 2026.

== Background ==
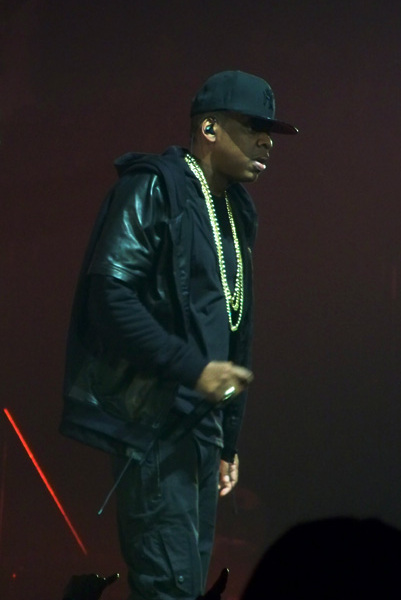
Sapp received criticism for his partnership with Roc Nation because of label founder Jay-Z (pictured in 2011) and his vocal anti-Christian beliefs.

=== 'Close the doors' controversy ===
In July 2024, during the 109th Pentecostal Assemblies for the World Convention in Baltimore, Maryland, Sapp requested that each of the 2,000 attendees donate $20 to reach a $40,000 goal. Requesting ushers several times to "close the doors", it was alleged that he intended to hold the congregation "hostage" until the goal was met. In March 2025, video filmed of the event circulated on social media; Sapp and his church received very negative backlash for the event, which included large criticism on social media as well as people calling Sapp's church with death threats. Sapp responded to the event, referring to it as a "misunderstanding", in which his goal was not to confine the congregation, but rather to "[create] a safe, focused, and reverent environment". Pentecostal Assemblies of the World issued a statement apologizing for the event becoming "an offense or hinderance for anyone."

=== Roc Nation partnership and controversy ===
In June 28, 2026, it was announced that Sapp had signed with Roc Nation. Sapp's partnership with the label, as well as a concurrent signing with Hezekiah Walker, would become the first instance of a gospel musician signing to the label, in an attempt for Roc Nation to expand their focus into religious music, as well as "to put gospel music in the ear of those who wouldn't normally hear it." The announcement was quickly met with criticism, predominantly on social media platforms Instagram and X, with the public believing that it was not appropriate for a gospel musician to collaborate with Roc Nation founder Jay Z, who has historically been noted for his anti-Christian lyricism; some also believed the partnership to be "rooted in ambition rather than purpose". Many Christians were also critical of gospel music's "sonic proximity to secular music," and gospel musicians seeking for recognition within the mainstream music industry.

== Content ==
=== Style ===
Restoration's primary genre is gospel. Sapp himself has drawn comparisons between Restoration and much of his previous work, primarily his 2007 release Thirsty. His goal with the album was for it to be, thematically, "potent and consistent with songs that resonate with the hearts, the struggles and the triumphs of the human experience," and musically "a refreshing, current sound with a couple of unexpected treats," while his overall intention was to create an album that was "Christ-centered, churchy and funky all at the same time." The lyrics to Restoration were inspired largely by the public reception of the 'close the doors' controversy. Speaking on the inspiration behind the album, Sapp stated:

I especially enjoyed recording this album because its focus is timely and will bless people during these times of harsh criticism, cancel culture and overall uncertainty. The songs have been a balm for me, and I pray they will be the same for all who listen. I also recorded this album live, which is always, overall, a great experience. The experience of restoration is truly at the heart of my personal testimony; I poured my all into these songs to help everyone remember what I know to be true: God is a redeemer, a reviver and a restorer.

=== Recording and development ===
Restoration was recorded live at Sapp's church, Chosen Vessel Church in Fort Worth, Texas. The album was produced by Curtis Lindsey, becoming the first album of Sapp's to be produced by him. Sapp was the sole writer of the lyrics to Restoration, becoming his first album to written exclusively by himself. Sapp wrote album's lyrics at Disney World due to his "creativity flow[ing] while he's people-watching." Subsequent to the creation of Restoration, Sapp sent the recording to two record labels, although neither of the two complied to release the project. Sapp considered releasing the album independently, until Roc Nation contacted him "out of the blue", pursued a partnership with Sapp, and agreed to release Restoration.

== Reception ==
Professional ratings
Review scores
Source	Rating
Shatter the Standards	4/5 stars

=== Commercial ===
Restoration contains one charted song. "He's Not Finished", the album's lead single, debuted on the Billboard Hot Gospel Songs chart at number 10 on September 5, 2026, and the following week peaked at number 8. It entered the Gospel Airplay chart at number 28 on November 7, 2026, and on November 28, 2026, reached its peak position at number 18 on the chart.

== Track listing ==
All lyrics are written by Curtis Lindsey and Marvin Sapp unless otherwise noted; all music is composed by Sapp.

Restoration track listing
No.	Title	Music	Length
1.	"You Are Welcome"		5:17
2.	"The Blood"	Curtis Lindsey; Gus Lacy; Marvin Sapp	4:49
3.	"At His Feet"	Lindsey; Lacy; Sapp	4:48
4.	"Never Let Me Go"		7:36
5.	"Victory in My Voice"	Lindsey; Lacy; Sapp	6:31
6.	"You're My Peace"		4:59
7.	"Restoration"	Sapp	4:22
8.	"Breathe Into Me"	Sapp	5:05
9.	"He's Not Finished"	Sapp; Stan Jones
10.	"You Keep Blessing Me"		4:20
Total length:			55:48

== Personnel ==
Credits adapted from Apple Music.

- Adam Smith – assistant mixing engineer
- Arreiun Tucker – keyboards
- Christina M Lindsey – background vocals
- Curtis Lindsey – keyboards, producer, recording engineer
- Dan Shike – mastering engineer
- Gus Lacy – background vocals
- Jason Tyson – mixer
- John Jaszcz – mixing engineer
- Jordan Smith – recording engineer
- Lloyd Barry – horn
- Marvin Sapp – vocals, executive producer
- Plu Harmon – recording engineer
- Roy Cotton – strings
- Sam Mitchem – guitar
- Shaniqua Wilson – background vocals
- Tavarius Johnson – drums
- Thaddeus Johnson – bass

== Release history ==
Release history and formats for Restoration
Region	Date	Format(s)	Label(s)
Various	November 20, 2026	CD; digital download; streaming	Roc Nation
