= Hot Gospel Songs =

Music chart by Billboard

Hot Gospel Songs is a music chart published weekly by Billboard magazine in the United States. It ranks the popularity of gospel songs using the same methodology developed for the Billboard Hot 100, the magazine's flagship songs chart, by incorporating data from the sales of downloads, streaming data, and airplay across all monitored radio stations.

From its inception in March 2005 through November 2013, the Hot Gospel Songs chart ranked the top songs only by overall audience impressions of songs played on gospel music radio stations. Beginning with the chart dated December 7, 2013, the chart follows the same methodology used for the Hot 100 to compile its rankings. The Gospel Airplay chart was launched simultaneously to continue to monitor airplay of songs on gospel radio.

The first number-one song on the chart was "We Must Praise" by J Moss in the chart dated March 19, 2005. The current number-one song on the chart is "Come Jesus Come" by CeCe Winans.

== Song milestones ==
=== Most cumulative weeks at number-one ===
List of songs with 5 or more cumulative weeks at number-one, showing year of release.

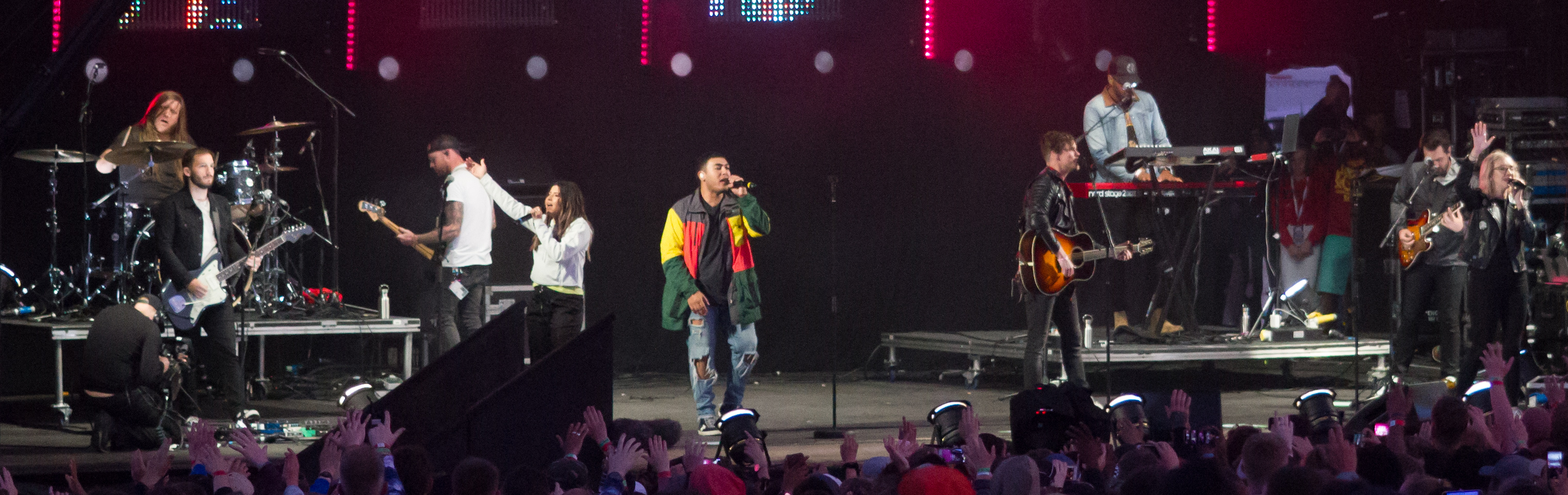
Elevation Worship

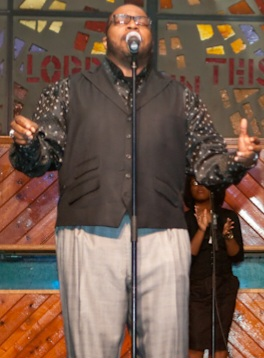
Marvin Sapp

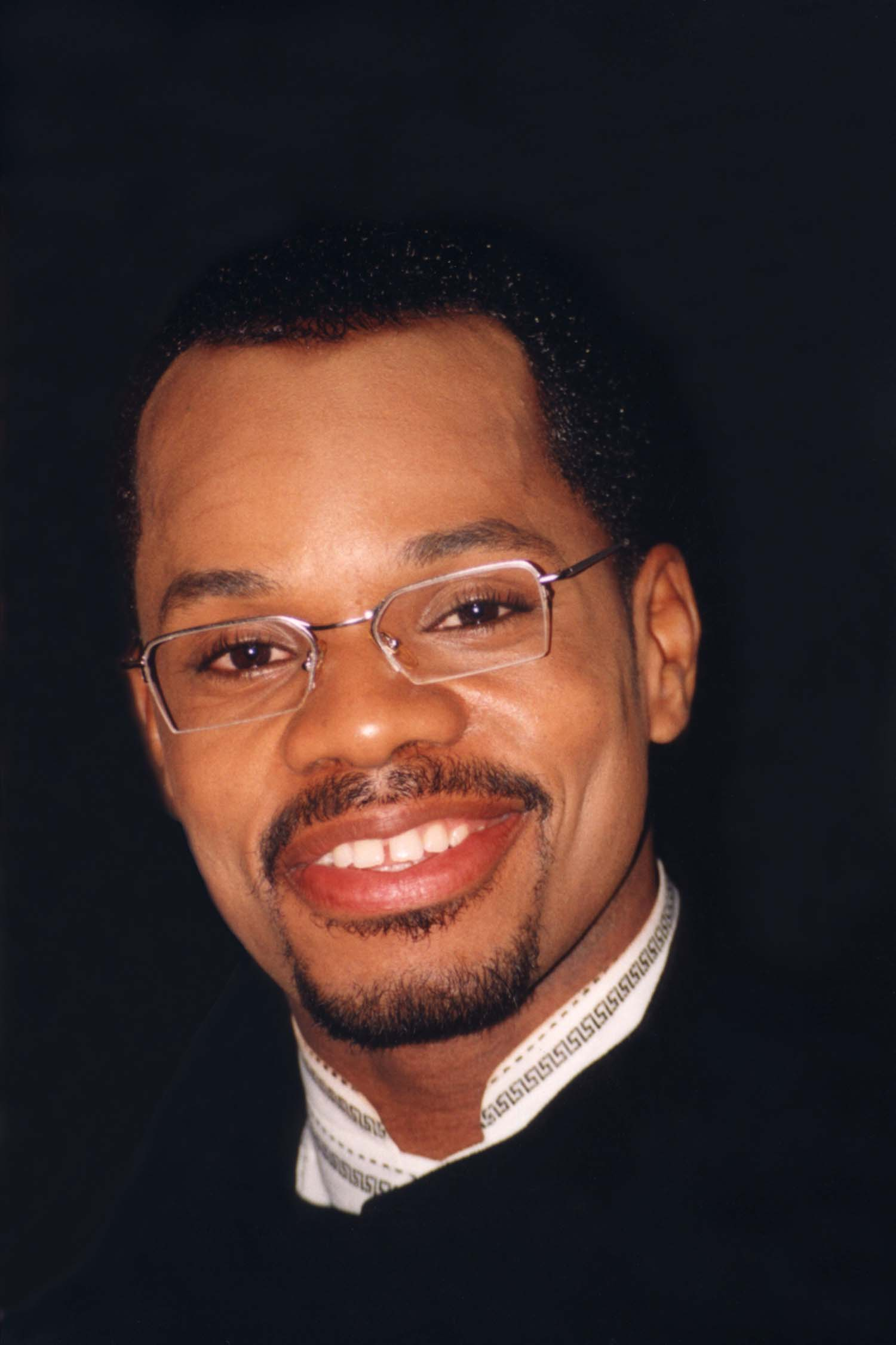
Kirk Franklin

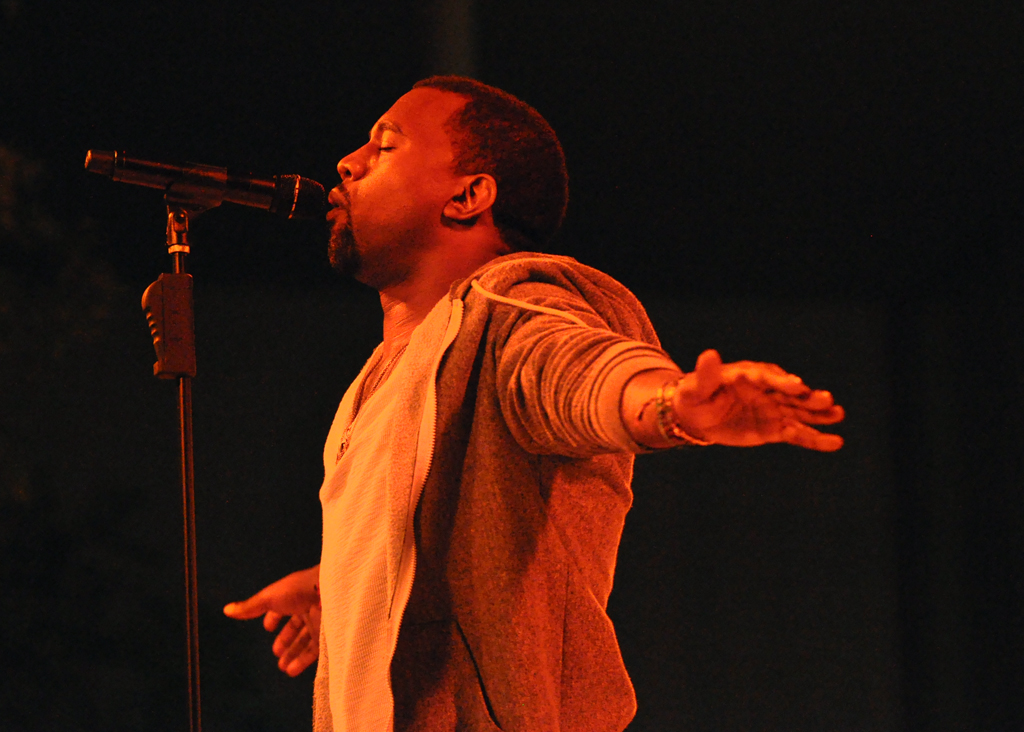
Kanye West

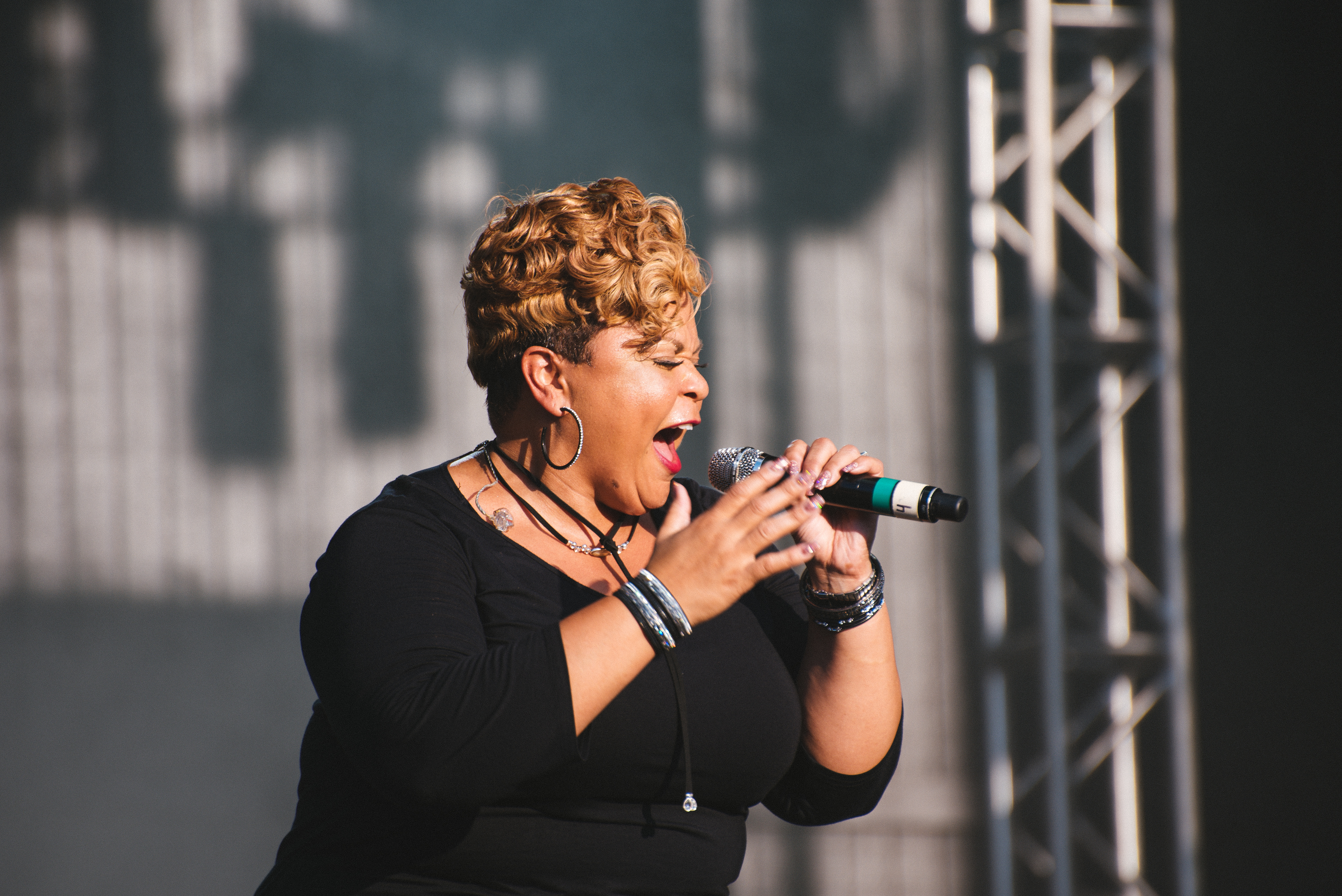
Tamela Mann

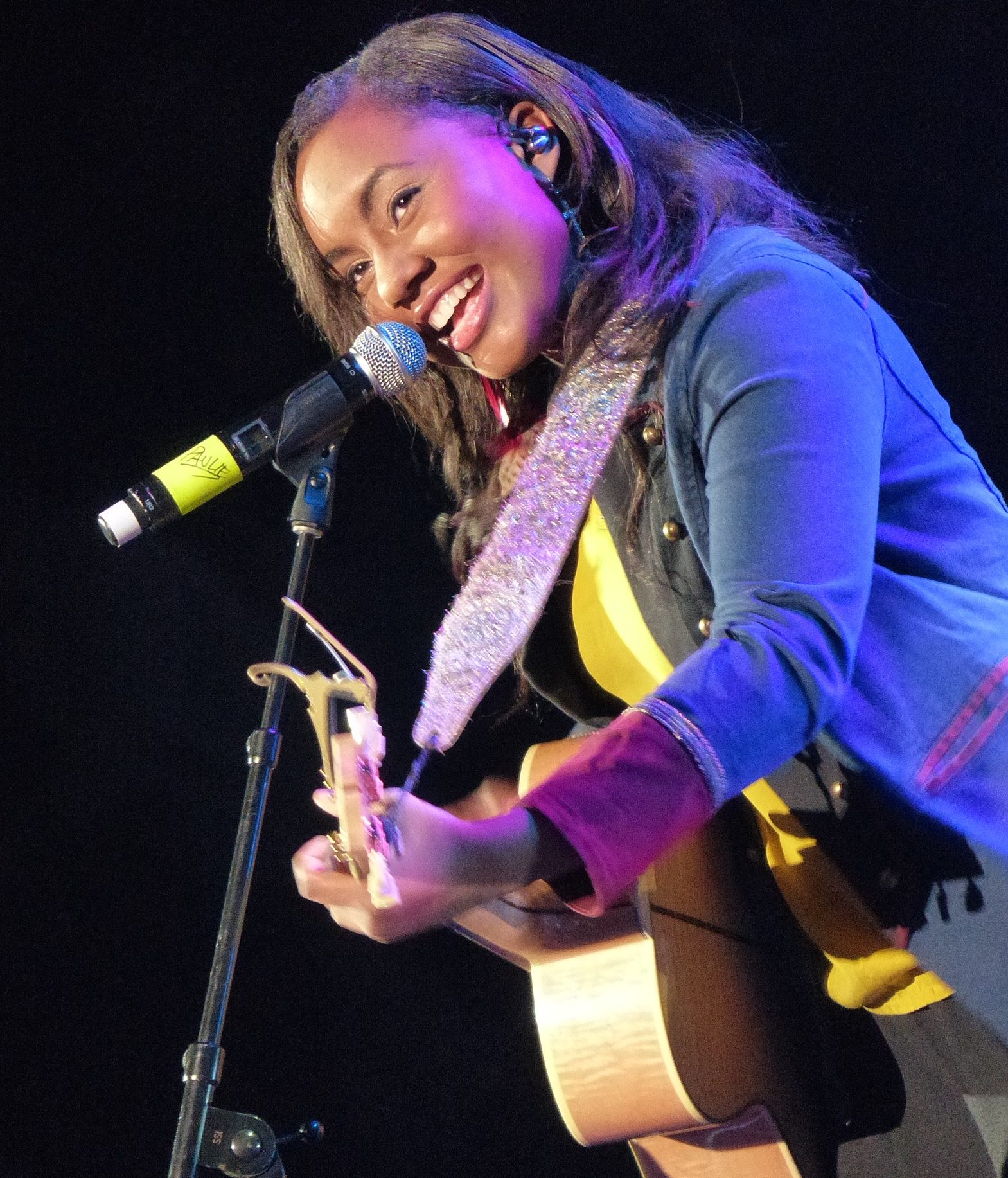
Jamie Grace

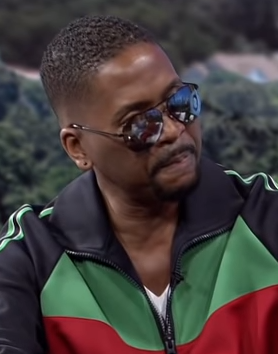
Donald Lawrence

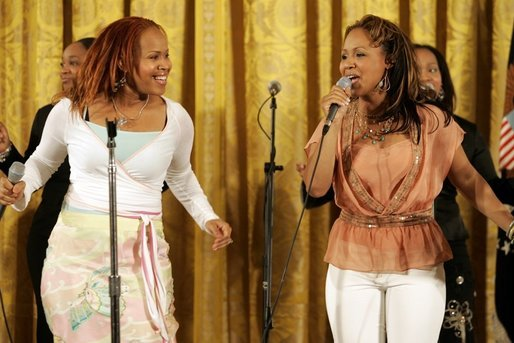
Mary Mary

Song	Wks.	Year	Artist	Ref.
"Jireh"	86	2021	Elevation Worship and Maverick City Music featuring Chandler Moore and Naomi Raine	
"That's My King"	49	2024	CeCe Winans	
"Never Would Have Made It"	46	2007	Marvin Sapp	
"Wanna Be Happy?"	45	2015	Kirk Franklin	
"Love Theory"	44	2019	Kirk Franklin	
"Won't He Do It"	41	2017	Koryn Hawthorne	
"Follow God"	41	2019	Kanye West	
"Come Jesus Come"	32	2024	CeCe Winans	
"I Trust You"	29	2008	James Fortune & FIYA	
"Every Praise"	26	2013	Hezekiah Walker	
"The Best in Me"	25	2010	Marvin Sapp	
"Take Me to the King"	25	2012	Tamela Mann	
"I Smile"	23	2011	Kirk Franklin	
"Change Me"	23	2016	Tamela Mann	
"Beautiful Day"	20	2014	Jamie Grace	
"I Believe"	19	2010	James Fortune & FIYA featuring Zacardi Cortez & Shawn McLemore	
"Speak To Me"	19	2020	Koryn Hawthorne	
"Looking for You"	18	2005	Kirk Franklin	
"The Blessing Of Abraham"	18	2006	Donald Lawrence presents the Tri-City Singers	
"Heaven"	15	2005	Mary Mary	
"Souled Out"	14	2008	Hezekiah Walker & LFC	
"For Your Glory"	14	2015	Tasha Cobbs Leonard	
"Encourage Yourself"	13	2006	Donald Lawrence presents the Tri-City Singers	
"Um Good"	13	2006	Smokie Norful	
"I Need Your Glory"	13	2011	Earnest Pugh	
"They That Wait"	13	2013	Fred Hammond featuring John P. Kee	
"Hurricane"	13	2021	Kanye West and the Weeknd featuring Lil Baby	
"Break Every Chain"	12	2013	Tasha Cobbs Leonard	
"Believe for It"	12	2021	CeCe Winans	
"It's Not Over (When God Is In It)"	11	2013	Israel & New Breed featuring James Fortune and Jason Nelson	
"Promises"	11	2022	Maverick City Music featuring Joe L. Barnes and Naomi Raine	
"Close To You"	10	2009	BeBe & CeCe Winans	
"All I Need Is You"	10	2014	Lecrae	
"Praise God"	10	2021	Kanye West	
"Nobody Greater"	9	2010	VaShawn Mitchell	
"God Really Loves Us"	9	2023	Crowder and Dante Bowe featuring Maverick City Music	
"In the Middle"	8	2011	Isaac Carree	
"Worth"	8	2015	Anthony Brown & Group Therapy	
"Fill Me Up"	8	2015	Casey J	
"Wash Us in the Blood"	8	2020	Kanye West featuring Travis Scott	
"I Call You Faithful"	7	2005	Donnie McClurkin	
"I Will Bless The Lord"	7	2006	Byron Cage	
"Blessed and Highly Favored"	7	2007	The Clark Sisters	
"God in Me"	7	2008	Mary Mary featuring Kierra "KiKi" Sheard	
"Declaration (This Is It!)"	7	2008	Kirk Franklin	
"Still Able"	7	2011	James Fortune & FIYA	
"Say Yes"	7	2013	Michelle Williams featuring Beyoncé and Kelly Rowland	
"Hold My Mule"	7	2016	Shirley Caesar featuring Albertina Walker and Milton Brunson	
"I'm Blessed"	6	2017	Charlie Wilson	
"Work it Out"	5	2005	Dr. Charles G. Hayes and the Warriors featuring Dianne Williams	
"It Ain't Over (Until God Says It's Over)"	5	2008	Maurette Brown Clark	
"Put a Praise On It"	5	2016	Tasha Cobbs Leonard featuring Kierra Sheard	

=== Number-one debuts ===
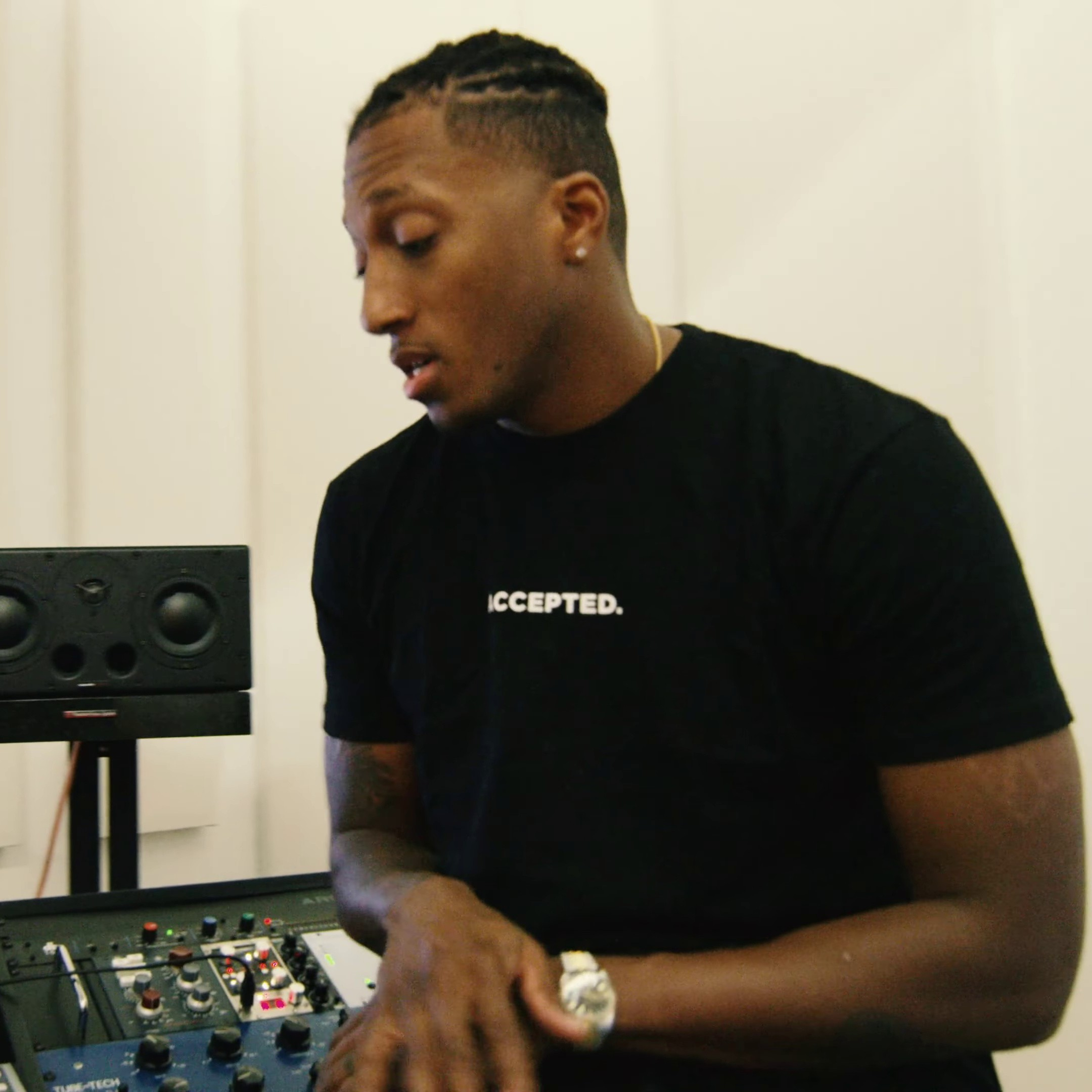
Lecrae

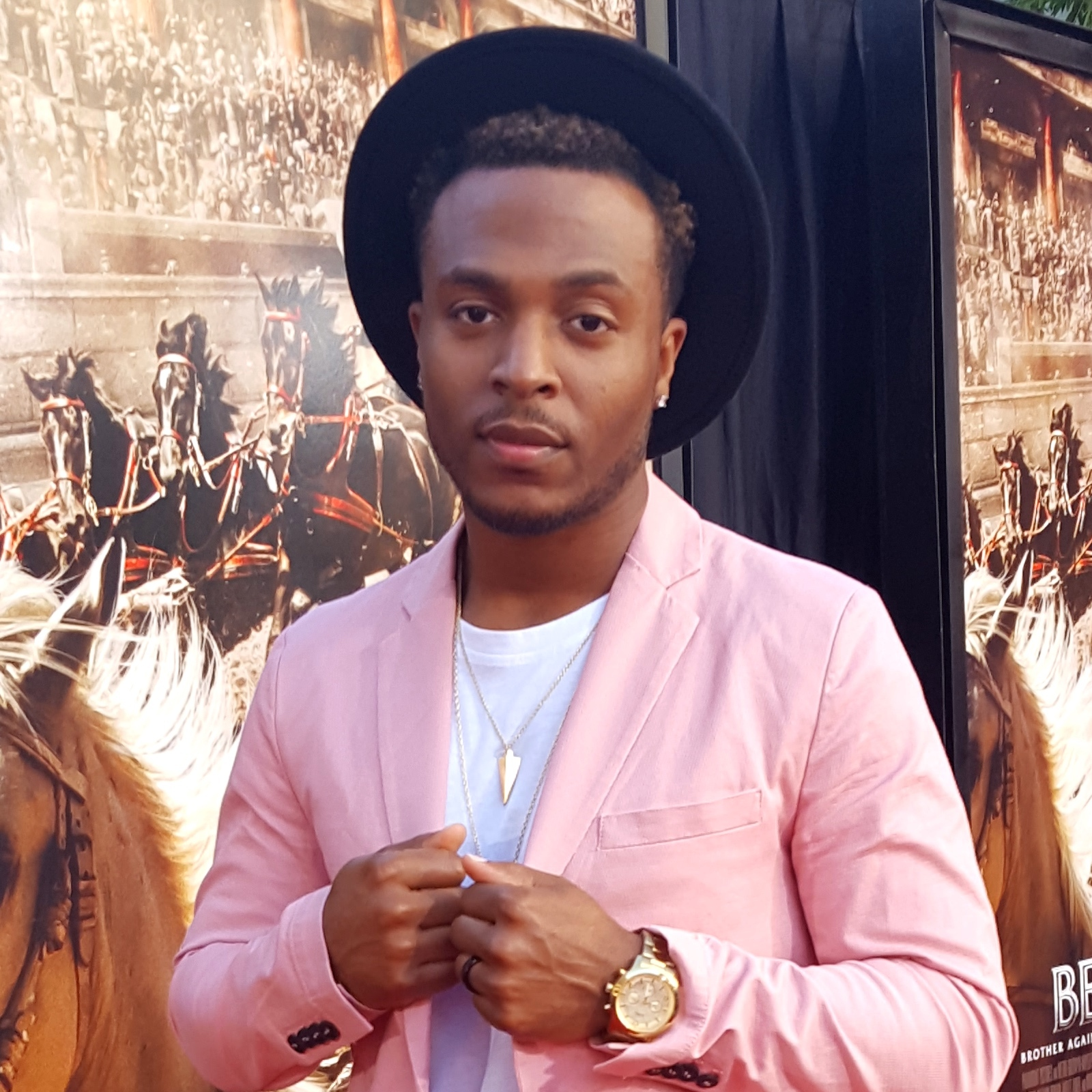
Flame

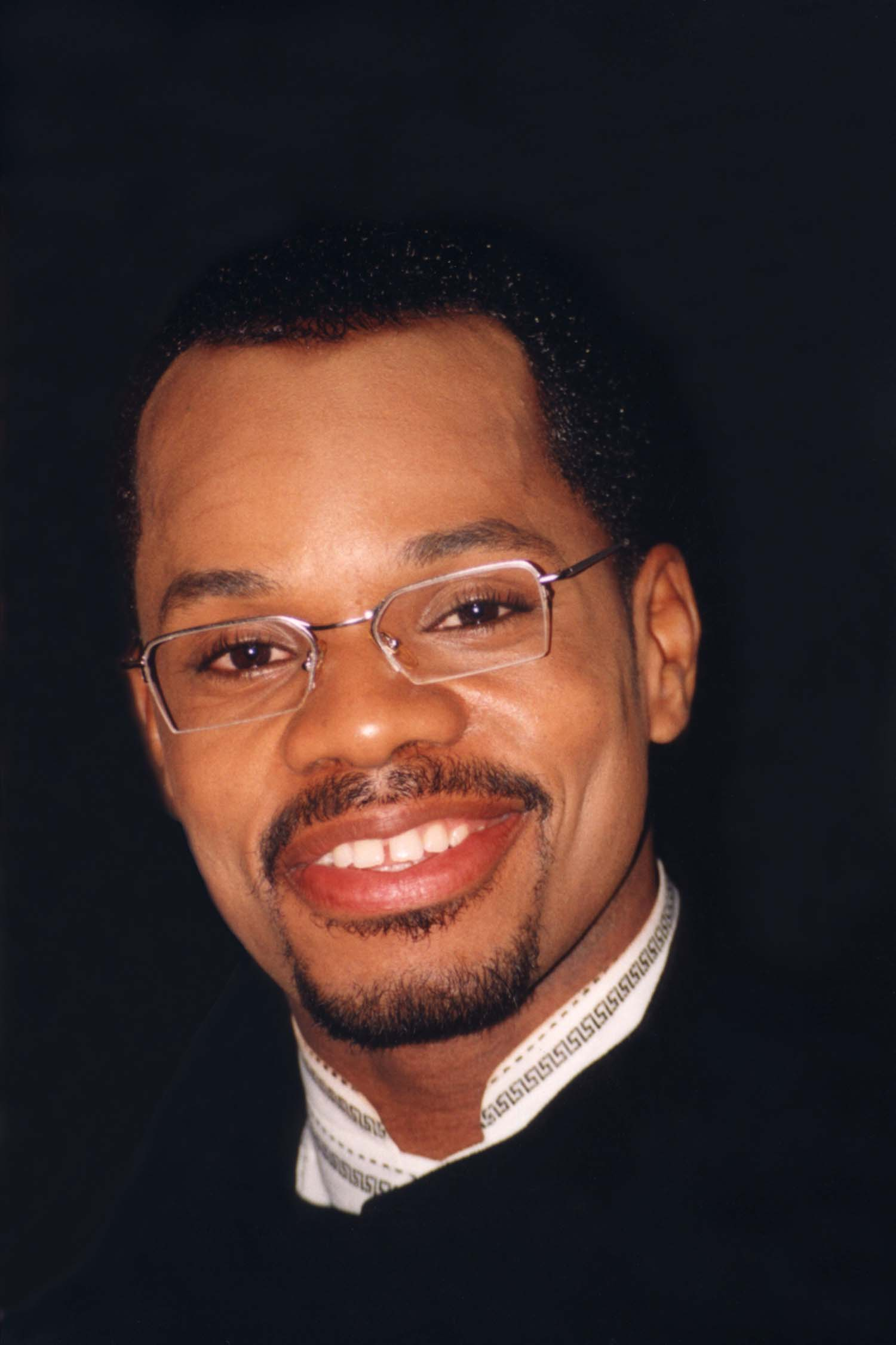
Kirk Franklin

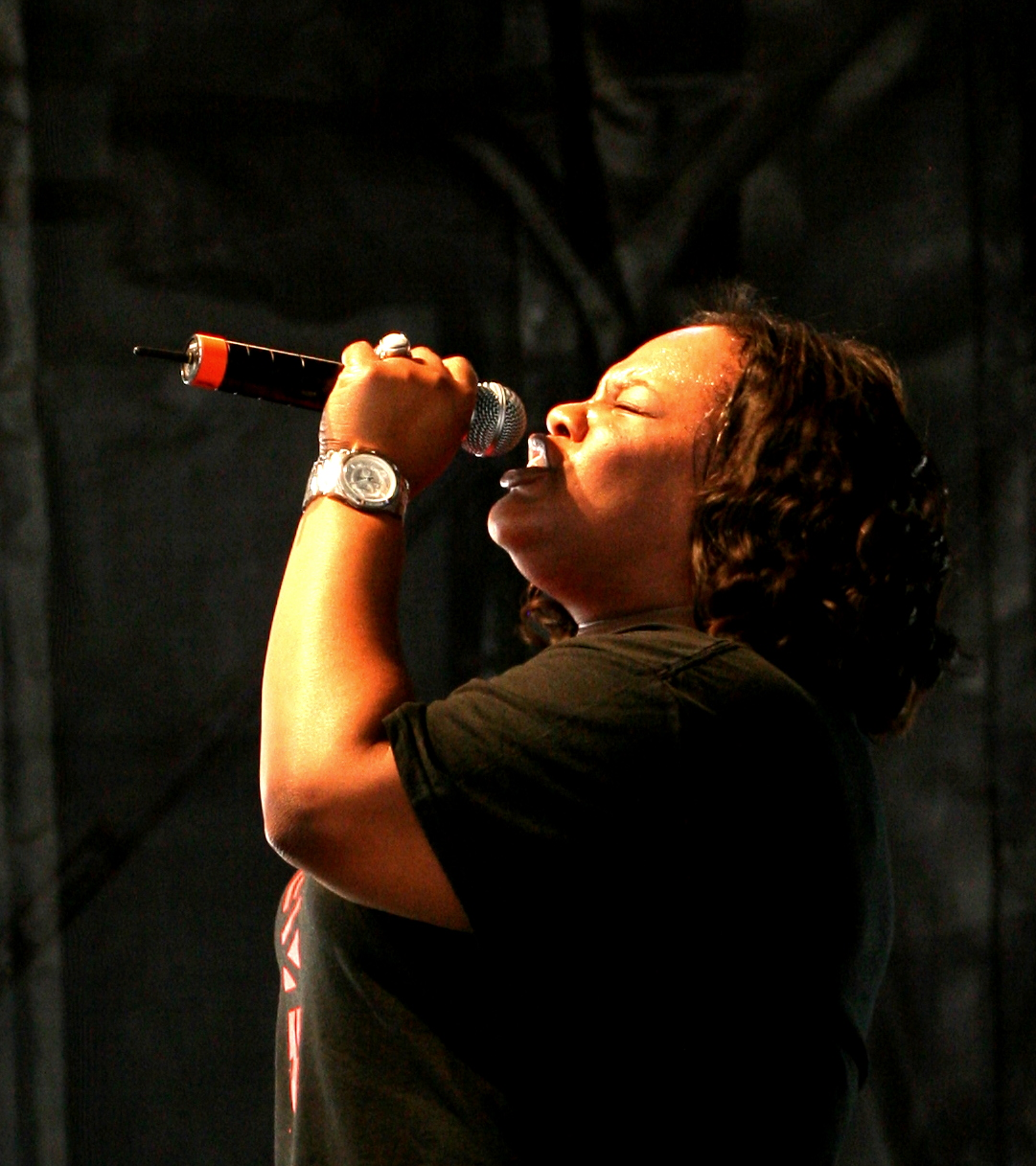
Tasha Cobbs

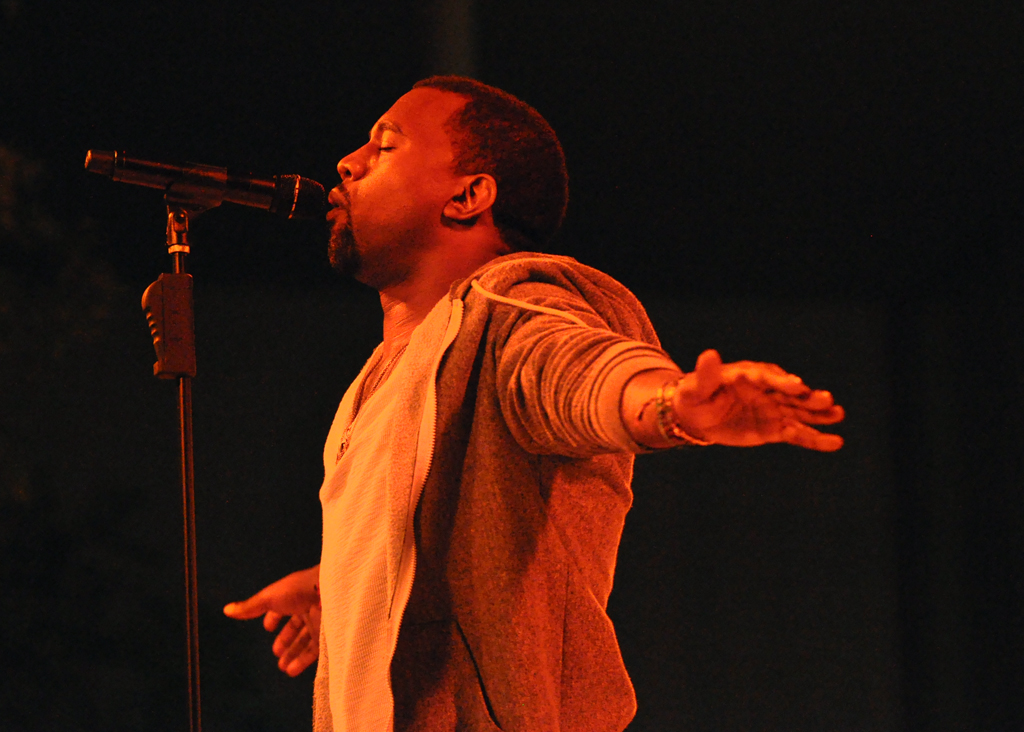
Kanye West

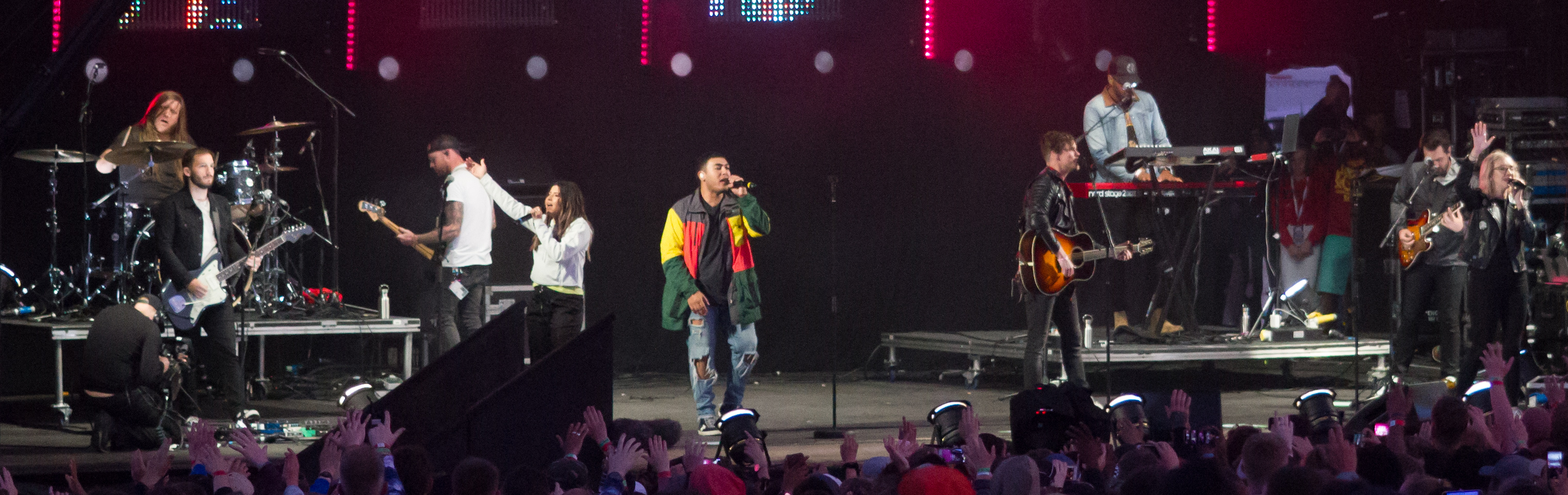
Elevation Worship

List of songs which have debuted at number-one.

Song	Debut date	Artist	Ref.
"We Must Praise"	March 19, 2005	J Moss	
"Joyful Noise"	July 19, 2014	Flame featuring Lecrae & John Reilly	
"Nuthin"	August 9, 2014	Lecrae	
"All I Need Is You"	August 23, 2014	Lecrae	
"Say I Won't"	September 13, 2014	Lecrae featuring Andy Mineo	
"Wanna Be Happy?"	September 19, 2015	Kirk Franklin	
"I'm Getting Ready"	September 16, 2017	Tasha Cobbs Leonard featuring Nicki Minaj	
"Love Theory"	February 9, 2019	Kirk Franklin	
"Follow God"	November 9, 2019	Kanye West	
"Wash Us in the Blood"	July 11, 2020	Kanye West featuring Travis Scott	
"Jireh"	April 10, 2021	Elevation Worship and Maverick City Music featuring Chandler Moore and Naomi Raine	
"Talking to Jesus"	April 24, 2021	Elevation Worship and Maverick City Music featuring Brandon Lake	
"Wait on You"	May 8, 2021	Elevation Worship and Maverick City Music featuring Dante Bowe & Chandler Moore	
"We Win"	June 5, 2021	Lil Baby and Kirk Franklin	
"Hurricane"	September 11, 2021	Kanye West and the Weeknd featuring Lil Baby	
"Blessings"	December 23, 2023	Nicki Minaj featuring Tasha Cobbs Leonard	
"Rain Down on Me"	October 26, 2024	GloRilla, Kirk Franklin & Maverick City Music featuring Kierra Sheard & Chandler Moore	
"Heal"	May 31, 2025	Jamal Roberts	
"Forgiveness"	July 26, 2025	Marvin Winans	
"Rain Down"	November 8, 2025	Daniel Caesar featuring Sampha	

=== Most cumulative weeks on chart ===
List of songs with 52 or more total weeks on the chart, showing year of debut on the chart.

Song	Wks.	Year	Artist	Ref.
"Jireh"	213	2021	Elevation Worship and Maverick City Music featuring Chandler Moore and Naomi Raine	
"Every Praise"	102	2013	Hezekiah Walker	
"Won't He Do It"	94	2017	Koryn Hawthorne	
"That's My King"	92	2024	CeCe Winans	
"Love Theory"	90	2019	Kirk Franklin	
"Come Jesus Come"	86	2024	CeCe Winans	
"Promises"	80	2021	Maverick City Music featuring Joe L. Barnes and Naomi Raine	
"Never Would Have Made It"	79	2007	Marvin Sapp	
"Nobody Greater"	79	2010	VaShawn Mitchell	
"Hurricane"	78	2021	Kanye West and the Weeknd featuring Lil Baby	
"Goodness of God"	78	2022	CeCe Winans	
"Follow God"	76	2019	Kanye West	
"For Your Glory"	73	2013	Tasha Cobbs Leonard	
"Praise God"	72	2021	Kanye West	
"Amazing"	70	2014	Ricky Dillard & New G	
"I Trust You"	69	2008	James Fortune & FIYA	
"Fear Is Not My Future"	69	2022	Maverick City Music and Kirk Franklin featuring Brandon Lake and Chandler Moore	
"They That Wait"	68	2009	Fred Hammond featuring John P. Kee	
"Let the Church Say Amen"	68	2011	Andrae Crouch featuring Marvin Winans	
"Break Every Chain"	67	2013	Tasha Cobbs Leonard	
"I'm Blessed"	65	2017	Charlie Wilson	
"God Favored Me"	64	2009	Hezekiah Walker & LFC featuring Marvin Sapp and D. J. Rogers	
"Take Me to the King"	62	2012	Tamela Mann	
"Work it Out"	61	2007	Troy Sneed presents Bonafide Praisers	
"It's Not Over (When God Is In It)"	61	2012	Israel & New Breed featuring James Fortune and Jason Nelson	
"The Best in Me"	60	2010	Marvin Sapp	
"Justified"	60	2019	Smokie Norful	
"One God"	59	2007	Maurette Brown Clark	
"I Need You"	58	2016	Donnie McClurkin	
"Yesterday"	57	2005	Mary Mary	
"Souled Out"	57	2008	Hezekiah Walker & LFC	
"God Really Loves Us"	57	2022	Crowder and Dante Bowe featuring Maverick City Music	
"Imagine Me"	56	2006	Kirk Franklin	
"Look At God"	56	2023	Koryn Hawthorne	
"Holy Forever"	56	2023	CeCe Winans	
"God in Me"	55	2009	Mary Mary featuring Kierra "KiKi" Sheard	
"I Believe"	55	2010	James Fortune & FIYA featuring Zacardi Cortez and Shawn McLemore	
"He Has His Hands On You"	55	2010	Marvin Sapp	
"Change Me"	55	2016	Tamela Mann	
"Rain on Us"	54	2009	Earnest Pugh	
"Fill Me Up"	54	2014	Casey J	
"Believe for It"	54	2021	CeCe Winans	
"Praise Him In Advance"	53	2008	Marvin Sapp	
"I Smile"	53	2011	Kirk Franklin	
"Hold On"	53	2012	James Fortune & FIYA featuring Monica and Fred Hammond	
"I Can Only Imagine"	53	2013	Tamela Mann	
"Yes You Can"	53	2015	Marvin Sapp	
"Put a Praise On It"	53	2015	Tasha Cobbs Leonard featuring Kierra Sheard	
"Broken But I'm Healed"	52	2006	Byron Cage	
"Livin'"	52	2007	The Clark Sisters	
"Back II Eden"	52	2008	Donald Lawrence & Co.	
"Close To You"	52	2009	BeBe & CeCe Winans	
"Well Done"	52	2010	Deitrick Haddon	
"I Need Your Glory"	52	2011	Earnest Pugh	
"Turning Around For Me"	52	2012	VaShawn Mitchell	
"Greater is Coming"	52	2012	Jekalyn Carr	
"Beautiful Day"	52	2014	Jamie Grace	
"No Greater Love"	52	2014	Smokie Norful	
"Wanna Be Happy?"	52	2015	Kirk Franklin	
"Joy"	52	2016	VaShawn Mitchell	
"You're Bigger"	52	2016	Jekalyn Carr	
"Your Great Name"	52	2017	Todd Dulaney	
"Listen"	52	2017	Marvin Sapp	
"I'm Getting Ready"	52	2017	Tasha Cobbs Leonard featuring Nicki Minaj	
"Off the Grid"	52	2021	Kanye West featuring Playboi Carti and Fivio Foreign	
"Moon"	52	2021	Kanye West featuring Kid Cudi and Don Toliver	
"Kingdom"	52	2022	Maverick City Music and Kirk Franklin featuring Naomi Raine and Chandler Moore	

== Artist achievements ==
=== Most number-one singles ===
Artists with multiple number-one songs.

Artist	No.	Ref.
Kirk Franklin	9	
Maverick City Music	6	
Tasha Cobbs Leonard	5	
Kanye West	5	
CeCe Winans	5	
Marvin Sapp	4	
Elevation Worship	4	
James Fortune & FIYA	4	
Lecrae	4	
Chandler Moore	4	(Note: For "More Than Able" and Elevation Worship chart history.; For "Jireh", "Wait on You" and Maverick City Music chart history.; For "Rain Down On Me" and Kirk Franklin chart history.)
Hezekiah Walker	3	
Koryn Hawthorne	3	
Kierra Sheard	3	(Note: For "Put a Praise On It" and Tasha Cobbs Leonard chart history.; For "God in Me" and Mary Mary chart history.; For "Rain Down On Me" and Kirk Franklin chart history.)
Mary Mary	2	
Smokie Norful	2	
Earnest Pugh	2	
Tamela Mann	2	

=== Most entries ===
Artists with 10 or more entries.

Artist	No.	Ref.
Maverick City Music	59	
Kirk Franklin	46	
Kanye West	39	
Tasha Cobbs Leonard	39	
CeCe Winans	33	
Jonathan McReynolds	22	
Donald Lawrence	22	
Tamela Mann	21	
James Fortune & FIYA	20	
Deitrick Haddon	20	
Marvin Sapp	20	
Fred Hammond	19	
Tye Tribbett	18	
Jekalyn Carr	17	
Erica Campbell	15	
Ricky Dillard	15	
Mary Mary	14	
Smokie Norful	14	
Byron Cage	13	
Elevation Worship	13	
Anthony Brown & Group Therapy	13	
Todd Dulaney	13	
Donnie McClurkin	12	
Earnest Pugh	12	
Hezekiah Walker	11	
Israel & New Breed	11	
Yolanda Adams	11	
Troy Sneed	10	
VaShawn Mitchell	10	

=== Most top ten entries ===
Artists with five or more top ten entries.

Artist	No.	Ref.
Maverick City Music	35	
Kirk Franklin	28	
Kanye West	27	
Tasha Cobbs Leonard	19	
Chandler Moore	17	
CeCe Winans	17	
Tamela Mann	13	
Marvin Sapp	12	
James Fortune & FIYA	12	
Jekalyn Carr	12	
Naomi Raine	11	
Jonathan McReynolds	11	
Elevation Worship	10	
Fred Hammond	10	
Deitrick Haddon	10	
Mary Mary	9	
Kierra Sheard	9	(Note: "Why Me?"; For "God in Me" and Mary Mary chart history; "Praise Him Now"; For "Put a Praise On It", "Your Spirit" and Tasha Cobbs Leonard chart history; For "Hang On" and GEI chart history; "It Keeps Happening"; "Something Has To Break"; "Miracles")
Donald Lawrence	8	
Tye Tribbett	8	
Anthony Brown & Group Therapy	8	
Yolanda Adams	7	
Erica Campbell	7	
Donnie McClurkin	7	
Smokie Norful	7	
Hezekiah Walker	6	
Todd Dulaney	6	
Byron Cage	5	
Troy Sneed	5	
VaShawn Mitchell	5	
Koryn Hawthorne	5	
Ricky Dillard	5	

== Other achievements ==
- Kirk Franklin has the most number-one songs on Hot Gospel Songs.
- Tasha Cobbs Leonard has the most number-one songs for a female artist on Hot Gospel Songs.
- Lecrae has the most number-one debuts (4), all of which were in 2014.
- "Work It Out" by Dr. Charles G. Hayes & the Warriors featuring Dianne Williams, was the first number-one recorded by a group. It succeeded Mary Mary's "Heaven", which had a record-setting 8 weeks at number-one.
- On the charts dated June 15, 2014, Kirk Franklin became the first artist to top all five of Billboard's main Gospel charts simultaneously — Long, Live, Love topped Top Gospel Albums, whilst "OK" topped Gospel Digital Song Sales and "Love Theory" led Hot Hot Gospel Songs, Gospel Airplay and Gospel Streaming Songs.
- With the album Jesus Is King (2019), Kanye West became the first artist to occupy the entire top 10 on both Hot Christian Songs and Hot Gospel Songs, monopolizing the top 11 of the latter.
- With the album Donda (2021), Kanye West occupied the top 23 spots on Hot Gospel Songs, setting a record.
- In April 2021, Elevation Worship and Maverick City Music became the first groups with multiple number-one debuts on Hot Gospel Songs, when "Talking to Jesus" replaced their first number-one "Jireh" within the same month.
- In 2025, Cece Winans' "That's My King" became the longest-running number-one by a female artist, with 49 weeks at the top, replacing Koryn Hawthorne's "Won't He Do It" which accumulated 41 weeks in 2018, and surpassing Tamela Mann's 25 week reign with “Take Me to the King.”
- In April 2025, Cece Winans' "Come Jesus Come" set a record 58-week journey to number-one, surpassing Ricky Dillard & New G’s “Amazing”, which took 47 weeks to reach number-one in December 2014.

== See also ==
- Top Gospel Albums
- Hot Christian Songs
