= The Best in Me =

The Best in Me may refer to:

- "The Best in Me", a song by Marvin Sapp from Here I Am
- "Mon alliée (The Best in Me)", a song by Tom Leeb which would've represented France in the Eurovision Song Contest 2020
