= Aaron Camper =

American singer

- Also known as: Camp
- Born: Salisbury, Maryland, U.S.
- Genres: R&B; soul; gospel
- Occupations: Singer; songwriter
- Years active: 2003–present
- Labels: BASSic Black; EMPIRE; The Vanguarde

Aaron Camper is an American singer and songwriter from Salisbury, Maryland. Raised in a church environment as the son of a preacher, Camper began his career in gospel music and performed with gospel artist Tye Tribbett. He later moved into R&B and songwriting, working with artists including Jill Scott, Eric Roberson, Diddy, Justin Timberlake, David Guetta, and BJ the Chicago Kid.

Camper received a Grammy nomination for co-writing the song "Power" from Marvin Sapp's album Thirsty, released in January 2007. In 2021, Camper launched his new alias Camp, with the release of "Issues". He continued the project with the two EPs Therapy, released in November 2021, and Process in March 2022.

== Early life ==
Camper was born and raised in Salisbury, Maryland. He is the son of a preacher and grew up in church, where music became part of his early life. Camper was influenced by artists including Al Green, Marvin Gaye, Phil Collins, Michael McDonald, The Winans, New Edition, and Wu-Tang Clan.

Camper attended Parkside High School and graduated in 2003, where he played point guard on the basketball team. Although he attracted interest from college basketball programs, he ultimately chose to pursue a career in music instead. He later credited basketball and his coach for teaching him teamwork and leadership.

== Career ==
=== Early career, Welcome to My World, and releases (2003–2014) ===
Following high school in 2003, Camper joined gospel singer Tye Tribbett and performed and recorded with him. During this period, Camper also developed as a songwriter and co-wrote "Power", a song featured on Marvin Sapp's Grammy-nominated album Thirsty (2007). After moving into R&B and pop music, Camper collaborated with artists including Jill Scott, Justin Timberlake, Chris Brown, David Guetta, Diddy, Stevie Wonder, Fantasia, and Eric Roberson. He also performed on tours and shared stages with artists including Justin Timberlake, Rihanna, and Chris Brown.

In 2011, Camper launched his solo career through BASSic Black, a label operated by musical director and producer Adam Blackstone. He released the mixtape Welcome to My World, which included the song "Take Off", later used as the theme song for The Queen Latifah Show.

Camper released singles including "Madness", "Breaking My Heart", and "My Heart", were issued from 2012 through 2014.

=== Blow, Hi-DEF, and Camp (2015–presents) ===
In 2015, Camper released the singles "Hypnotizing" and "Choose You". During the same period, he prepared his debut project Blow, introducing songs including "Guns & Roses". Camper described the song as "a patient man's perspective on that destructive relationship we all go through at some point in our lives."

Blow was released in 2016 and later followed by the EP Hi-DEF in 2018. The singles "Hypnotizing" and "Blow" gained attention online and accumulated more than 20 million streams combined.

In 2017, Camper released "High $ Habit" and "Fire", both appearing on a mixtape project centered on relationships and personal experiences. Camper also released "Heat", which appeared on his planned project Summer Camp, the follow-up to Blow.

Camper became a member of Chris Dave and the Drumhedz. During the group's 2020 appearance on NPR's Tiny Desk Concert, Camper performed as vocalist and opened the set. Outside music, Camper created the Camp Classic charity basketball event in his hometown of Salisbury, Maryland. The event supports youth initiatives and community programs.

In 2021, Camper appeared on Robin Thicke's song "The Things You Do to Me", featured on the album On Earth, and in Heaven. That same year, he introduced his new alias "Camp" with the release of "Issues", a more understated and experimental R&B track. He later released the EP Therapy in November 2021, followed by another EP Process, in March 2022.

== Discography ==
=== Mixtapes ===
- Welcome to My World (2011)

=== Studio albums ===
- Blow (2016)

=== EPs ===
- Hi-DEF (2018)
- Therapy (Camp; 2021)
- Process (Camp; 2022)

=== Singles ===
- "Madness" (2012)
- "Breaking My Heart" (2013)
- "My Heart" (2014)
- "Hypnotizing" (2015)
- "Choose You" (2015)
- "Guns & Roses" (2016)
- "High $ Habit" (2017)
- "Fire" (2017)
- "Heat" (2017)
- "Issues" (Camp; 2021)
