= Nothing Else Matters (disambiguation) =

"Nothing Else Matters" is a 1992 song by Metallica.

Nothing Else Matters may also refer to:

- Nothing Else Matters (film), 1920
- Nothing Else Matters (album), by Marvin Sapp in 1999
- "Nothing Else Matters", a song by Little Mix from Glory Days
- "Nothing Else Matters", a song by Lionel Richie from Louder Than Words
