= Madman's Eyes =

Single by Dave Matthews Band

from the album Walk Around the Moon
- Released: January 24, 2023
- Length: 4:48
- Label: RCA
- Songwriters: Dave Matthews; Carter Beauford; Stefan Lessard; Tim Reynolds; Rashawn Ross; Jeff Coffin; Buddy Strong
- Producers: Rob Evans; John Alagía; Mark Batson

Dave Matthews Band singles chronology
"Come Tomorrow" (2019)	"Madman's Eyes" (2023)	"Monsters" (2023)

"Madman's Eyes" is a song by American jam band Dave Matthews Band. It was released on January 24, 2023, as the lead single from their tenth studio album Walk Around the Moon. The song was first played live by the band in 2021.

== Background ==
"Madman's Eyes" begins with a saxophone solo by Jeff Coffin. The song features a prominent Middle Eastern influence and lyrically revolves around mass shootings and society's reaction to them.

"Madman's Eyes" peaked at number four on the Billboard Adult Alternative Airplay chart, the band's highest placement since "Mercy" in 2012.

== Personnel ==
- Carter Beauford – drums, background vocals
- Jeff Coffin – tenor saxophone, baritone saxophone, tárogató
- Stefan Lessard – bass, Moog Taurus pedals
- Dave Matthews – lead vocals, background vocals, acoustic guitar, electric guitar, tambourine, electric sitar
- Tim Reynolds – electric guitar, 12-string guitar, backwards guitar
- Rashawn Ross – trumpet, bass trumpet, background vocals
- Buddy Strong – Hammond B3 organ, Wurlitzer electric piano, background vocals
