= I Win =

Live album by Marvin Sapp
- Released: April 3, 2012
- Recorded: October 7, 2011
- Venue: Evangel Cathedral, Upper Marlboro, Maryland
- Genre: Gospel, R&B
- Length: 65:05
- Label: Verity Gospel Music Group/RCA

Marvin Sapp chronology
Here I Am (2010)	I Win (2012)	You Shall Live (2015)

Professional ratings
Review scores
Source	Rating
AllMusic	3.5/5 stars

I Win is the sixth live album and ninth overall album by Marvin Sapp recorded at Evangel Cathedral in Upper Marlboro, Maryland. The album was released after Jive disbanded, in which Verity quietly became a subsidiary of RCA Records, before the official early 2013 rebrand to RCA Inspiration. The release of I Win debuted at number nine on the Billboard 200 with first-week sales of 37,000 copies. The album has sold 161,000 copies in the United States as of May 2015.

== Track listing ==
Track number	Track title	Writer(s)	Time
1	"Teach My Hands to War (Intro)"	Aaron Lindsey	0:55
2	"Teach My Hands to War"	Aaron Lindsey	4:54
3	"I Belong to You"	Stan Jones	3:59
4	"Never"	Romel Gibson and John Jackson Jr.	4:52
5	"I Win"	Brittney Wright and Joshua Lay	6:48
6	"Glory"	Jonathan Dunn and Juante M. Hall	7:34
7	"The Hymns Medley: I Need Thee Every Hour/Bless the Lord/Can't Nobody Do Me Like Jesus/Oh, the Blood/The Blood Will Never Lose Its Power/There Is Power in the Blood"	Andrae Crouch, Annie S. Hawkes, Lewis E. Jones, and Robert Lowrey	9:09
8	"Deeper"	Darius Paulk	6:24
9	"My Testimony"	Marvin Sapp and Aaron Lindsey	10:26
10	"Do Me Like You"	Kenny Black, Jason Hendrickson, and Shakira Jones	4:05
11	"Keep It Movin'"	Aaron Lindsey and Daniel Johnson	5:59

== Chart positions ==
Chart (2012)	Peak position
U.S. Billboard 200	9
U.S. Billboard Top Gospel Albums	1
