= Marvin Sapp (album) =

Studio album by Marvin Sapp
- Released: March 12, 1995
- Genres: Gospel, R&B
- Length: 47:05
- Label: Word

Marvin Sapp chronology
Marvin Sapp (1995)	Grace & Mercy (1997)

Marvin Sapp is the debut album by musical artist Marvin Sapp released via Word Records.

== Track listing ==
Track number	Track title	Writer(s)	Time
1	"Reign Jesus Reign"	Fred Hammond and Kim Rutherford	4:45
2	"Hero"	Percy Bady	4:23
3	"Sweeter as the Days Go By"	Mark Parker	4:12
4	"Close to You"	Fred Hammond and Steve Huff	5:19
5	"In His Presence"	Fred Hammond and Kim Rutherford	4:23
6	"Calling Me"	Fred Hammond and Marvin Sapp	4:32
7	"Use Me"	Percy Bady	4:50
8	"He Is Here"	Fred Hammond, David Ivey, Mark Luckey, and Kirk Talley	5:06
9	"Faithful"	Noel Hall, Fred Hammond, and Kim Rutherford	4:56
10	"Over and Over Again"	Percy Bady, Marvin Sapp, and Dennis Witherspoon	4:39
