= Walk Around the Moon =

2023 studio album by Dave Matthews Band

Studio album by Dave Matthews Band
- Released: May 19, 2023
- Recorded: 2006, August 2020–September 2022
- Studio: Haunted Hallow Studio (Charlottesville, Virginia), The Mill, The Rhino Room, Hill House, The Village, Electro Kitty, The Church, Studio Zen 3000
- Genre: Rock
- Length: 42:42
- Label: RCA
- Producer: Rob Evans · John Alagía · Mark Batson

Dave Matthews Band chronology
Come Tomorrow (2018)	Walk Around the Moon (2023)	Where Are You Going: The Singles (2025)

Singles from Walk Around the Moon
- 1. "Madman's Eyes" Released: January 24, 2023; 2. "Monsters" Released: April 20, 2023; 3. "Walk Around the Moon" Released: May 17, 2023

Professional ratings
Aggregate scores
Source	Rating
Metacritic	77/100
Review scores
Source	Rating
AllMusic	4.5/5 stars
Exclaim!	6/10
Pitchfork	6.7/10

Walk Around the Moon is the tenth studio album by the American rock band Dave Matthews Band. It was released on May 19, 2023, through RCA Records. Recording primarily took place from August 2020 to September 2022; the track "Break Free" dates back to 2006.

The band's first studio album since Come Tomorrow (2018); it is their first release to feature keyboardist Buddy Strong.

The album was a commercial success, reaching the top 5 in the U.S.

== Background ==
Work started during the COVID-19 pandemic, with recording sessions taking place with limited band members at a time at the band's Haunted Hollow Studio in Charlottesville, Virginia.

Seven of the 12 tracks on Walk Around the Moon were played live prior to the official album announcement on January 24, 2023. "Break Free" has been played going back to 2006.

At 42 minutes and 42 seconds long, Walk Around the Moon is the band's shortest album to date.

== Commercial performance ==
Walk Around the Moon debuted at number five on the US Billboard 200, the first album of theirs not to debut at number one since 1996's Crash while selling 44,000 album-equivalent units in the first week, of which 40,000 were pure album sales. It is Dave Matthews Band's 14th US top-10 album.

== Track listing ==
Walk Around the Moon
No.	Title	Writer(s)	Length
1.	"Walk Around the Moon"	David J. Matthews; Carter Beauford; Stefan Lessard; Tim Reynolds; Rashawn Ross; Jeff Coffin; Arthur "Buddy" Strong; Rob Evans	4:49
2.	"Madman's Eyes"	Matthews; Beauford; Lessard; Reynolds; Ross; Coffin; Strong	4:48
3.	"Looking for a Vein"	Matthews; Evans	2:44
4.	"The Ocean and the Butterfly"	Matthews; Beauford; Lessard; Reynolds; Ross; Coffin; Strong	3:05
5.	"It Could Happen"	Matthews; Beauford; Lessard; Reynolds; Ross; Strong	2:46
6.	"Something to Tell My Baby"	Matthews	2:32
7.	"After Everything"	Matthews; Beauford; Lessard; Reynolds; Ross; Coffin; Strong	2:47
8.	"All You Wanted Was Tomorrow"	Matthews; Beauford; Lessard; Reynolds; Ross; Coffin; Strong	3:50
9.	"The Only Thing"	Matthews; Beauford; Lessard; Reynolds; Ross; Coffin; Strong; John Alagía	4:42
10.	"Break Free"	Matthews; Beauford; Lessard; LeRoi Moore; Boyd Tinsley; Mark Batson	4:08
11.	"Monsters"	Matthews; Beauford; Reynolds; Alagía	3:33
12.	"Singing from the Windows"	Matthews	2:58
Total length:			42:42

== Personnel ==
Dave Matthews Band

- Carter Beauford – drums (1–2, 4–5, 7–11), background vocals (1–2, 7–9), cabasa (1), tambourine (9)
- Jeff Coffin – tenor and baritone saxophone (1–2, 7–10), tárogató (2), soprano saxophone (4)
- Stefan Lessard – bass (1–2, 5, 7–10), Moog Taurus pedals (2), upright bass (4)
- Dave Matthews – vocals, acoustic guitar (2–6, 8–9, 11–12), electric guitar (1–3, 5, 7, 9), background vocals (1–2, 5, 7, 9, 11), Wurlitzer (1, 3, 5), synthesizer (1, 3), piano (1, 5), Mellotron and nylon string guitar (1), tambourine and electric sitar (2), bass and loops (3), organ (6), baritone guitar (10)
- Tim Reynolds – electric guitar (1–2, 4–5, 7–11), 12-string acoustic guitar and backwards guitar (2), nylon string guitar (5), dobro (8), acoustic guitar (9)
- Rashawn Ross – trumpet (1–2, 4, 7–10), bass trumpet and background vocals (1–2, 7–9), flugelhorn (1, 5, 9)
- Buddy Strong – Hammond B3 organ (1–2, 5, 7–10), background vocals (1–2, 7–9), piano (1, 5, 8), Wurlitzer (2, 4, 7, 9), Moog One (5, 7, 9), vocals (7), Rhodes (8), clavinet (9)

Additional musicians

- John Alagía – arpeggio guitar (5, 10), background vocals (10–11), electric 12-string guitar and synthesizer (5), drum programming, ebow, slide, electric guitar, and Hammond B3 organ (11)
- Mark Batson – Hammond B3 organ, piano, and Rhodes (10), Moog bass (11)
- Charlie Bisharat – violin (2)
- Jacob Braun – cello (2)
- David Campbell – conductor and string arrangement (2)
- Susan Chatman – violin (2)
- Giovanna Clayton – cello (2)
- Mario De Leon – violin (2)
- Amie Doherty – string arrangement (6)
- Andrew Duckles – viola (2)
- Thomas Evans – trombone (2)
- Alma Fernandez – viola (2)
- Joe Fotheringham – trumpet (5)
- Maria Grigoryeva – viola (6), violin (6)
- Thomas Harte Jr. – double bass (2)
- Paula Hochhalter – cello (2)
- Nick Hodges – ambient guitar (5)
- Julie Jung – cello (2)
- Suzie Katayama – violin (2)
- Oliver Kraus – cello, string arrangement, viola, and violin (5)
- Marisa Kuney – violin (2)
- Ana Landauer – violin (2)
- Luke Maurer – viola (2)
- Natalia Nazarova – cello (6)
- Alyssa Park – violin (2)
- Sara Parkins – violin (2)
- Kerenza Peacock – violin (2)
- Michele Richards – violin (2)
- Teresa Stanislav – violin (2)
- Jennifer Takamatsu – violin (2)
- Josefina Vergara – violin (2)
- Rodney Wirtz – viola (2)

Technical personnel

- John Alagía – engineer (5, 10–11), producer (7, 9, 11), co-producer (10)
- Justin Armstrong – engineer (7, 9)
- Mark Batson – producer (10)
- Ethan Bovey – assistant engineer (6, 9)
- Mayk Brambilla – cover art
- Billy Centenaro – engineer (10)
- Steve Churchyard – engineer (2)
- Rob Evans – engineer (2–12), producer (3–9, 12)
- Peter Hanaman – engineer (2)
- Oliver Kraus – engineer (5)
- Chris Kress – engineer (10)
- Alisse Laymac – engineer (10)
- JC LeResche – assistant engineer (2, 11)
- Steve Miller – engineer (10)
- Jeff Moxley – engineer (11)

== Charts ==
Chart performance for Walk Around the Moon
Chart (2023)	Peak position
Swiss Albums (Schweizer Hitparade)	98
UK Album Downloads (OCC)	57
US Billboard 200	5
