= I Believe (Marvin Sapp album) =

Live album by Marvin Sapp
- Released: June 11, 2002
- Recorded: 1999–2001
- Genre: Gospel, R&B
- Length: 76:04
- Label: Verity

Marvin Sapp chronology
Nothing Else Matters (1999)	I Believe (2002)	Diary of a Psalmist (2003)

Professional ratings
Review scores
Source	Rating
Allmusic	3/5 stars

I Believe is a live album and fourth overall album by Marvin Sapp as well as his debut on Verity Records. Most of the album was recorded in 1999, but it was delayed due to problems with Word Records. It was then pushed to the spring of 2001 then pushed to 2002 when Sapp signed with Zomba and Verity.

== Track listing ==
Track number	Track title	Writer(s)	Time
1	"I Believe"	Percy Bady	7:56
2	"Standing on the Rock"	Jonathan Dunn	4:52
3	"Life the Life"	Percy Bady	5:26
4	"Yet I"	Percy Bady	5:29
5	"All About You"	Anthony Dixon and Smokie Norful	6:47
6	"Praises"	Jonathan Dunn	5:30
7	"Unworthy"	Michael Brooks	5:47
8	"Help Us"	Percy Bady	4:28
9	"Follow Me"	Keyth Lee	6:23
10	"Come and Dine"	Jonathan Dunn	6:14
11	"None Like You Medley: I Worship You Almighty God/There Is None"	Sondra Corbett Wood	5:49
12	"I Love to Praise Him"	Traditional	7:33
13	"Not Now Doesn't Mean Never"	Percy Bady	3:50

== Chart positions ==
Chart (2002)	Peak position
U.S. Billboard Top R&B/Hip-Hop Albums	62
U.S. Billboard Top Gospel Albums	4

== Personnel ==
=== Band ===
- Percy Bady - keyboards
- Raymond Bady - drums, drum programming
- Simeon Baker - bass
- Derrick Buckingham - guitar
- Sean Cooper- Talkbox
- Rodney East - Piano
- Maurice Fitzgerald - bass
- Terry Baker - drums
- Gerald Haddon - keyboards
- Ralph Lofton - organ
- Desabata Robinson - guitar
- Paul Wright III - keyboards
- Terry Moore - organ
- Charles Willis - guitar

=== Background Vocals ===
- Cynthia Jernigan
- Brittany Bowen
- Malique Grear
- Percy Bady
- Clarence Ellis
