= Grace & Mercy =

Live album by Marvin Sapp
- Released: May 13, 1997
- Recorded: December 6, 1996
- Venue: Bethel Pentecostal Abundant Life Center
- Genres: Gospel, R&B
- Length: 57:54
- Label: Word

Marvin Sapp chronology
Marvin Sapp (1995)	Grace & Mercy (1997)	Nothing Else Matters (1999)

Professional ratings
Review scores
Source	Rating
Allmusic	4/5 stars

Grace & Mercy is the second album and the debut live album by Marvin Sapp. The album was recorded live in December 6, 1996 at Bethel Pentecostal Abundant Life Center. It featured production from Marvin Winans and Percy Bady. It peaked at number 11 on the Billboard Album charts.

== Track listing ==
Track number	Track title	Writer(s)	Time
1	"Rain on Me"	Marvin Winans	3:46
2	"Lord Send Your Anointing"	Marvin Winans	6:48
3	"Give Praise"	Marvin Winans	6:57
4	"Trust God"	Marvin Sapp and Percy Bady	5:20
5	"Not the Time, Not the Place"	Percy Bady	7:19
6	"For the Rest of My Life"	Aaron Lindsey, Marvin Sapp, and Percy Bady	5:38
7	"Grace and Mercy"	Percy Bady	7:41
8	"Whosoever Will"	Percy Bady	6:34
9	"Here's Where I Belong"	Percy Bady	3:04
10	"Give Praise (Reprise) featuring Marvin Winans, William Abney and Donnie McClurkin"	Marvin Winans	5:07

== Chart positions ==
Chart (1997)	Peak position
U.S. Billboard Top Gospel Albums	11

== Personnel ==
=== Band ===
- Richard Gibbs - Organ
- Al Willis - Guitars
- Raymond Bady - Drums
- Steve Huff - Bass
- Rodney East - Piano

=== Background Vocals ===
Roosevelt Agnew, Diane Alexander, Tyrone Block, Sheila Cutts, Renee Flowers, Malique Grear, Eleanor Hampton, Charlotte Horton, Michael Hudson, Donyle Jones, Norman McPherson, Desmond Pringle, Phyllis Russell, Henry Sapp, Meri Thomas, Orlando Wright, Ted Wright
