= Concept video =

Engaging animation to promote, describe, and explain tech & products

A concept video, also known as an "explainer video", is a marketing tool used to promote, describe and explain technological services (such as consulting), or products (such as apps), to individual consumers and other businesses (i.e. business to business). They may be released as part of a social media campaign, or used exclusively between the buyer and seller of the product. Concept videos may be developed in-house by the producer of the product, or by a third-party marketing company.
