= Aenon Bible College =

American college in Indiana

Coordinates: 39.82777°N 86.11314°W

Aenon Bible College is a unaccredited Pentecostal seminary and higher education institution headquartered in Indianapolis, Indiana.

Aenon runs a Distance Learning program and an online education system. It serves as a training center for ministers of the Pentecostal Assemblies of the World (PAW)

== History ==
in 1940, ministers Karl F. Smith and Labaugh Stansbury obtaining approval for the founding of Aenon from the general assembly of the Pentecostal Assemblies. The college was dedicated on January 16, 1941, in a ceremony at the Church of Christ of Apostolic Faith (CCAF) in Columbus, Ohio .

In 1944, Aenon moved to a three-story, 16-room campus in Indianapolis. In 1969, that facility was destroyed by fire. Aenon moved to the CCAF campus.

In 1981, Aenon had completed its moved to the Pentecostal Plaza in Indianapolis. In 1996. the college moved to its present location, a three-story, 2300-square-foot building.

Aenon has an enrollment averaging 2,000 students in over 100 satellite institutes around the world. The current college president is Bishop Michael D. Hannah Sr.
