= Nothing Else Matters (album) =

Studio album by Marvin Sapp
- Released: August 31, 1999
- Genre: Gospel, R&B
- Length: 47:16
- Label: Word

Marvin Sapp chronology
Grace & Mercy (1997)	Nothing Else Matters (1999)	I Believe (2002)

Professional ratings
Review scores
Source	Rating
Allmusic	3.5/5 stars

Nothing Else Matters is the third studio album by Marvin Sapp.

== Track listing ==
Track number	Track title	Writer(s)	Time
1	"More and More"	Fred Hammond, David P. Ivey, and Tommie Walker	4:31
2	"Give Thanks"	Percy Bady	5:27
3	"Power"	Percy Bady	4:35
4	"Do Your Dance"	Paul D. Allen and James L. Moss	3:53
5	"Won't Let Go"	L. Spenser Smith	4:55
6	"Nothing Else Matters"	Israel Simms	5:39
7	"Thank You Lord"	James L. Moss	3:49
8	"What About the Children"	Stanley Brown	4:32
9	"You Brought Me"	Percy Bady	4:42
10	"We Need You Right Now"	Donny Hathaway	5:13

== Chart positions ==
Chart (1999)	Peak position
U.S. Billboard Top Gospel Albums	6
