= Earnest Pugh =

American singer-songwriter

- Born: Earnest Pugh; November 23, 1966 (age 59); Memphis, Tennessee
- Genre: Gospel
- Occupations: Singer-songwriter, record producer, actor
- Instrument: Vocals
- Years active: 1999–present
- Label: EPM Music Group
- Website: earnestpugh.com

Earnest Pugh Jr. (born November 23, 1966) is an American gospel musician with a five-octave vocal range. Public recognition for the artist commenced with the success of Rain on Us (2009) and I Need Your Glory (2011), and he subsequently attained the title of "Gospel Music's Leading Man". Pugh is also the founder of the record label, EPM Music.

== Early life ==
Pugh was born in Memphis, Tennessee, the seventh of nine children. His father, Earnest Pugh Sr., worked at a Firestone plant in Flint, Michigan and commuted to see his family on weekends. His mother, Lillie Pearl Pugh, worked for the government and held a number of part-time jobs. She was the first to notice Pugh's singing ability and encouraged him to sing. "My mother believed in me and what I could accomplish" he once told the Miami Times. "Her death a few years ago hit me hard but I used that pain to inspire my writing on my last two CDs" January 2013

During his late teens, Pugh briefly sang with the Grammy Award-winning gospel choir, O'Landa Draper & The Associates. However, Pugh's tenure with the ensemble was short. He enlisted in the Army and remained there for fifteen years. He told The Washington Post that he "frequently was called on to sing at funerals."

After retiring from the military, Pugh held a number of positions with churches as a worship leader in Texas and Georgia. In 2001, he became a worship leader at Ebenezer AME Church in the Washington, D.C. area.

== Music career ==
After seeking recording contracts from major gospel record labels and being rejected, Pugh decided to launch his own label in 2006. His first album, Earnest Pugh Live: A Worshipper's Perspective, was released via a distribution agreement with Detroit's Crystal Rose Records label. The radio single Wrapped Up, Tied Up, Tangled Up rose to the Top 40 on the now defunct Radio & Records gospel radio chart and lay the foundation for his career. He followed up the next year with a CD entitled, Seasons Change, that failed to chart.

In 2007, his album, A Worshiper's Perspective, won Best Gospel Album at the 6th Annual Independent Music Awards.

A chance meeting with Blacksmoke Worldwide Gospel Records founder Kerry Douglas, who had taken James Fortune & FIYA and Keith Wonder Boy Johnson to the top of the gospel charts, would be pivotal to Pugh's evolution as a national artist. "He [Douglas] told me back in 2008 that he could take my single Rain on Us to number one and he did just that in less than eight weeks," Pugh told the Miami Times.

The dramatic ballad spent two weeks at No. 1 on Billboard's Hot Gospel Songs chart in 2009. The CD, Live: Rain on Us, also featured the Top-40 gospel radio hits Perfect Peace and The Great I Am.

In the early summer of 2011, Pugh delivered another CD titled Earnestly Yours. Douglas had Pugh re-record James Fortune's track, I Need Your Glory. The song shot to the Top Ten in a few weeks and stayed on the Billboard Hot Gospel Songs chart for ten weeks. The song and the CD earned Pugh extensive media coverage. "Pugh is a pointed and slick singer (and dresser), and for most of this strong album he provides a solid center while his backup choir sings in hushed and reverent tones", Jon Carmanica wrote in The New York Times.

In January 2012, Pugh announced that his EPM Music label had formed a distribution agreement with Entertainment One Distribution and would soon be signing a variety of high-profile gospel artists to record under his label banner.

== Discography ==
=== Albums ===
List of albums, with selected chart positions
Title	Album details	Peak chart positions			
Title	Album details	US	US Gospel	US Christian	Independent
Earnest Pugh Live: A Worshipper’s Perspective	Released: July 25, 2006; Label: Crystal Rose; Formats: CD, digital download	—	35	—	—
Live: Rain On Us	Released: July 28, 2009; Label: Worldwide; Formats: CD, digital download	110	2	5	12
Earnestly Yours	Released: June 28, 2011; Label: Worldwide; Formats: CD, digital download	51	1	1	7
Christmas With Earnest Pugh	Released: October 16, 2012; Label: Epm Music Group Llc; Formats: CD, digital download				
Best Of – The E Factor	Released: November 27, 2012; Label: Epm Music Group Llc; Formats: CD, digital download				
The W.I.N. (Worship in Nassau) Experience	Released: September 17, 2013; Label: P-Man Music; Formats: CD, digital download	46	—	—	—
Just Worship	Released: September 2, 2014; Label: P-Man Music; Formats: CD, digital download				
Hidden Treasures and Collaborations	Released: December 4, 2015; Label: P-Man Music; Formats: CD, digital download				
Survive	Released: October 27, 2017; Label: Blacksmoke Music/World Wide Inc.; Formats: CD, digital download				
"—" denotes items which failed to chart.

=== Singles ===
List of singles, with selected chart positions and certifications, showing year released and album name
Title	Peak chart positions				Album
Title	Hot Gospel	Gospel Digital	Hot R&B	Adult R&B Airplay	Album
"Rain On Us"	1	9	—^{[A]}	—	Live: Rain On Us
"The Great I Am"	15	—	—	—	Live: Rain On Us
"Perfect Peace"	22	—	—	—	Earnestly Yours
"I Need Your Glory"	1	7	98	33	Earnestly Yours
"I Believe You Most"	—	—	—	—	
"Thank Ya"	—	—	—	—	
"I Need You to Breathe"	—	—	—	—	Survive

=== Awards ===
Project	Award
2012 Stellar Award Nominations	Artist of the Year: Earnest Pugh
2012 Stellar Award Nominations	Male Vocalist of the Year: Earnest Pugh
2012 Stellar Award Nominations	Contemporary Male Vocalist of the Year: Earnest Pugh
2012 Stellar Award Nominations	Praise & Worship CD of the Year: Earnestly Yours
