= Diary of a Psalmist =

Studio album by Marvin Sapp
- Released: July 1, 2003
- Genres: Gospel, R&B
- Length: 70:30
- Label: Verity
- Producer: Kevin Bond

Marvin Sapp chronology
I Believe (2002)	Diary of a Psalmist (2003)	Be Exalted (2005)

Diary of a Psalmist is the fifth album by Marvin Sapp and his second on Verity Records. The album is mostly live with a few studio recorded tracks.

== Track listing ==
Track number	Track title	Writer(s)	Time
1	"One Thing"	Myron Williams	5:47
2	"Lift Those Hands"	Troy McIntosh	4:19
3	"Miracle"	Jonathan Dunn	6:37
4	"You Are God Alone"	Rodney Hubbard	8:59
5	"Worship Medley: I Worship You Almighty God/There Is None Like You/Something About That Name"	Lenny LeBlanc, William J. Gaither, Sandra Corbett-Wood, and Gloria Gaither	8:04
6	"Hallelujah"	Daniel Weatherspoon	5:25
7	"Unrestricted Praise"	Marvin Sapp and Tommie Walker	6:03
8	"You've Been So Good"	Kevin Bond and Darrell Freeman	5:59
9	"Glory to the Lamb"	Kevin Bond	5:43
10	"We Worship You Today"	Kevin Bond	5:15
11	"If You Just Believe"	Chris D. Collier	2:57
12	"Above All"	Paul Baloche and Lenny LeBlanc	5:22

== Chart positions ==
Chart (2003)	Peak position
U.S. Billboard Top Gospel Albums	6
