= Troy Sneed =

American gospel singer, songwriter, and musician (1967–2020)

- Born: Troy Lenard Sneed Jr. December 14, 1967; Perry, Florida
- Origin: Jacksonville, Florida
- Died: April 27, 2020 (aged 52) Jacksonville, Florida
- Genres: CCM, gospel, traditional black gospel, urban contemporary gospel, praise & worship
- Occupations: Singer, songwriter
- Instruments: vocals, singer-songwriter
- Years active: 1999–2020
- Labels: Malaco, Savoy, Emtro Gospel
- Formerly of: Georgia Mass Choir

Troy Lenard Sneed Jr. (December 14, 1967 – April 27, 2020) was an American gospel singer, songwriter, and musician.

== Early life ==
Sneed was born on December 14, 1967, in Perry, Florida, and played football while in college at Florida A&M University. He had an injury on the field that put an end to his playing days. He would join the choir at the university, and after graduating he was a teacher at Jax Beach Elementary School in Jacksonville, Florida. Milton Biggham, with Savoy Records, asked him to come lead the Georgia Mass Choir, in Atlanta, Georgia, as an assistant music minister.

== Music career ==
Sneed's music career began in 1999, with the release of Call Jesus on March 23, 1999, by Malaco Records, but this album would not chart. His subsequent album, Bless That Wonderful Name, was released by Savoy Records in 2001, yet this did not chart. The third album was released by his own record label imprint Emtro Gospel on February 22, 2005, A State of Worship, and it was his breakthrough release on Billboard magazine Gospel Albums chart at No. 22. He released, In His Presence, on October 10, 2006, by his label, which charted at No. 44 on the aforementioned chart. His fifth album, In Due Season, was released by his record label on August 25, 2009, however it was not successfully charted. The subsequent album, My Heart Says Yes, released on May 10, 2011, by Emtro Gospel, and this one would peak at No. 5 on the Gospel Albums chart. He released his seventh album on August 7, 2012, All Is Well, and this charted at No. 9 on the aforementioned chart.

== Personal life ==
Sneed married Emily Frances Ianson on July 2, 1993, and together they resided in Jacksonville, Florida, with their children.

== Death ==
Sneed died of complications from COVID-19 on April 27, 2020, during the COVID-19 pandemic in Florida.

== Discography ==
List of studio albums, with selected chart positions
Title	Album details	Peak chart positions
Title	Album details	US Gos
Call Jesus	Released: May 23, 1999; Label: Malaco; CD, digital download	–
Bless That Wonderful Name!	Released: 2001; Label: Savoy; CD, digital download	–
A State of Worship	Released: February 22, 2005; Label: Emtro Gospel; CD, digital download	22
In His Presence	Released: October 10, 2006; Label: Emtro Gospel; CD, digital download	44
In Due Season	Released: August 25, 2009; Label: Emtro Gospel; CD, digital download	–
My Heart Says Yes	Released: May 10, 2011; Label: Emtro Gospel; CD, digital download	5
All Is Well	Released: August 7, 2012; Label: Emtro Gospel; CD, digital download	-
