= Buddy Strong =

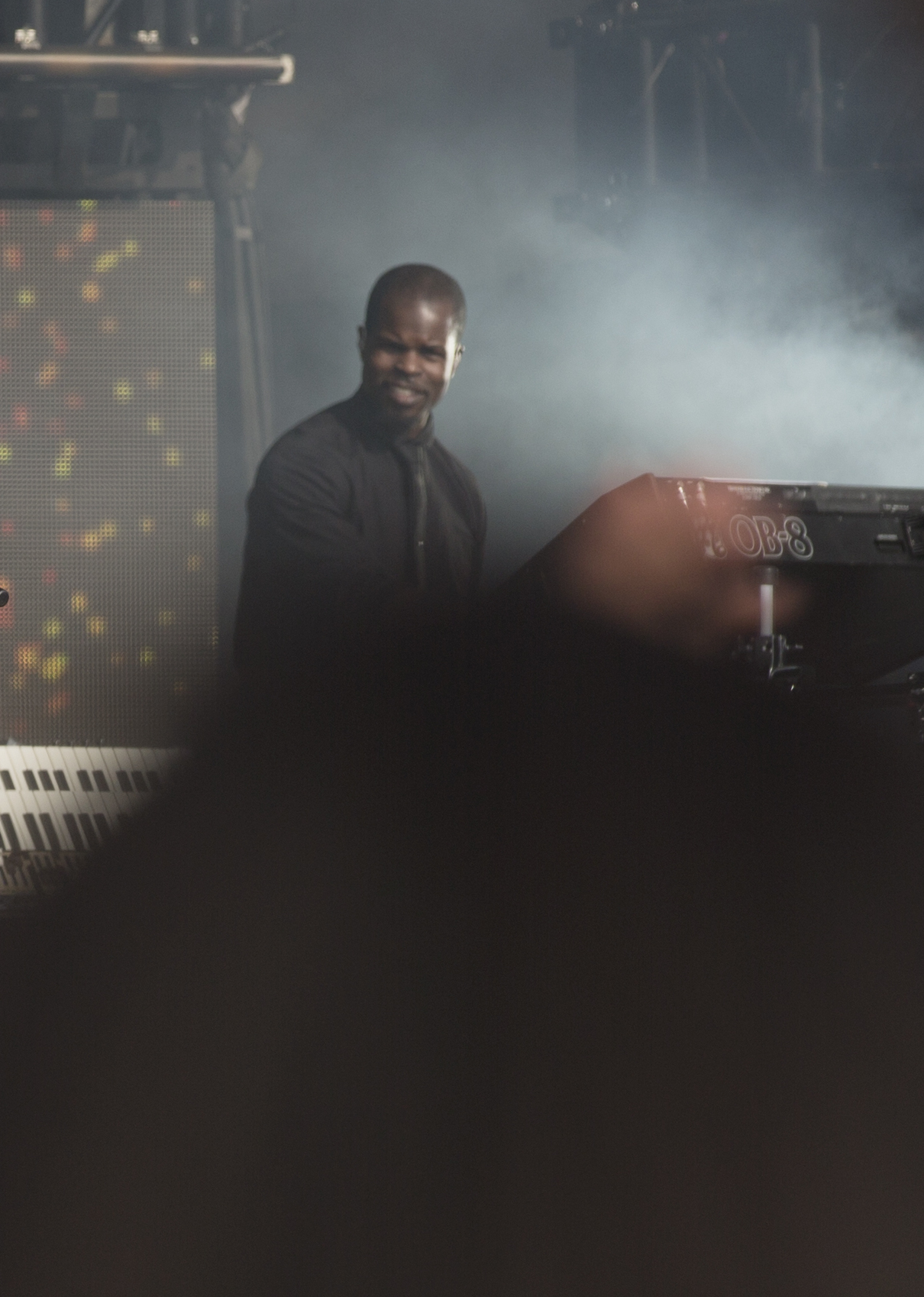
- Strong performing with Usher (2015)

Background information
- Born: Arthur Strong II; July 7, 1980 (age 46)
- Occupations: Musician; songwriter
- Instruments: Piano; keyboards; organ; vocals
- Years active: 2000-present
- Member of: Dave Matthews Band

Arthur "Buddy" Strong II (born July 7, 1980) is an American musician. He has worked as a touring keyboardist for artists including Usher and Ariana Grande, and joined Dave Matthews Band in 2018.

== Early life and education ==
Buddy Strong was born Arthur Strong II on July 7, 1980 to Kathy and Arthur Strong.

He began playing the organ in church from the age of eight, alongside his cousin Chris on drums and his father, a pastor. He became musical director of his father’s church, Faith Tabernacle COGIC, while still at high school, leading three choirs there. He won several jazz-band competitions for his drumming, and also played keyboards and bass guitar.

He attended South Mountain High School in Phoenix, Arizona, where he was a senior in the school's "magnet music" program.

== Career ==
In the early 2000s, he joined Usher to tour behind the album 8701 (2001), on which Strong also contributed to songwriting. He continued to work with Usher afterwards, including co-producing his 2004 album Confessions and joining the 2014–15 UR Experience Tour. He also joined Ariana Grande for the 2016-17 Dangerous Woman Tour and the 2017 benefit concert One Love Manchester.

Strong joined Dave Matthews Band in 2018, replacing violinist Boyd Tinsley. His first work with the band was on the song "Black and Blue Bird" from Come Tomorrow (2018).

In addition to piano and keyboards, Strong plays Hammond organ and contributes backing and occasional lead vocals. The band released their first full album with Strong, Walk Around the Moon, in 2023.
