= Never Would Have Made It =

Single by Marvin Sapp

from the album Thirsty
- Released: 2007
- Genre: Gospel
- Length: 3:49 (radio edit); 6:56 (album version) 5:01 (long radio version)
- Label: Verity, Zomba
- Songwriters: Matthew Brownie, Marvin Sapp

"Never Would Have Made It" is a single by American gospel singer Marvin Sapp from his seventh studio album Thirsty. Sapp wrote this song as a tribute after the death of his father, Henry Lewis Sapp, Jr. He testifies that it was created by divine inspiration the Sunday after his father’s burial.

== Music video ==
The 2008 music video features Sapp, and a cast of actors in interjecting scenes. Throughout the video, the scenes interchange and a revisited over the scenes plot development. The primary scene is Sapp in an auditorium; this scene moves from the stage to a balcony. The first of the interchanging scenes is shot in 16th Street Baptist Church, a church known for a Civil Rights Era bombing; over the course of exchanges the scene develops to show a pastor preaching from the pulpit. The second scene features a cast of three young women mourning at a graveside. The third scene features a mother and child in a car, presumably jobless and lacking resources to provide for her child. The original music video shows the live recording.

== Chart performance ==
The song is Sapp's biggest success so far on American music charts. The song peaked at #82 on the Billboard Hot 100 chart in the U.S. It also topped the Billboard Hot Gospel Songs chart and reached the top twenty on the Billboard Hot R&B/Hip-Hop Songs listing. The song topped the gospel chart for 46 weeks. The song was also certified platinum by the RIAA.

== Charts ==
=== Weekly charts ===
Weekly chart performance for "Never Would Have Made It"
Chart (2007–2008)	Peak position
US Billboard Hot 100	82
US Adult R&B Songs (Billboard)	1
US Gospel Airplay (Billboard)	1
US Hot Gospel Songs (Billboard)	1
US Hot R&B/Hip-Hop Songs (Billboard)	14
US R&B/Hip-Hop Airplay (Billboard)	14

=== Year-end charts ===
Year-end chart performance for "Never Would Have Made It"
Chart (2008)	Position
US Adult R&B Airplay (Billboard)	6
US Hot Gospel Songs (Billboard)	1
US Hot R&B/Hip-Hop Songs (Billboard)	36

== Certifications ==
Region	Certification	Certified units/sales
United States (RIAA)	Platinum	1,000,000^{^}
^{‡} Sales+streaming figures based on certification alone.
