= Be Exalted =

Studio album by Marvin Sapp
- Released: July 26, 2005
- Genres: Gospel, R&B
- Length: 67:56
- Label: Verity

Marvin Sapp chronology
Diary of a Psalmist (2003)	Be Exalted (2005)	Thirsty (2007)

Be Exalted was released in 2005 and is the sixth overall album by Marvin Sapp and his third on Verity Records.

== Track listing ==
Track number	Track title	Writer(s)	Time
1	"Be It Unto Me"	Aaron Lindsey	5:04
2	"Do You Know Him? (Trendsetters Mix)"	Marvin Sapp, Tommie Walker, Verdena Charlayne Taylor, Tamieka Hall, and Monique Hedley	5:18
3	"Be Exalted"	Jonathan Dunn	9:06
4	"Trust in You"	Jonathan Dunn	7:24
5	"Changed"	Steve White and Ted Wynn	4:42
6	"Perfect Peace"	Rudolph Stanfield	4:53
7	"Holy"	Steve White	4:59
8	"Everything That I Am"	Clarence Singleton and Melvin Dinkins	4:30
9	"That Name"	James Poyser and Daniel Johnson	4:48
10	"Smile"	Steve White, Ted Wynn, and Clarence Singleton	4:24
11	"Strong Tower"	Israel Houghton and Ricardo Sanchez	5:20
12	"He Won't Fail"	Percy Bady	3:42
13	"Do You Know Him/(Tommygunn 1965 Mix)"	Marvin Sapp, Tommie Walker, Verdena Charlayne Taylor, Tamieka Hall, and Monique Hedley	3:46

== Chart positions ==
Chart (2005)	Peak position
U.S. Billboard 200	164
U.S. Billboard Top R&B/Hip-Hop Albums	41
U.S. Billboard Top Gospel Albums	2
