= Here I Am (Marvin Sapp album) =

Album by Marvin Sapp

Studio album by Marvin Sapp
- Released: March 16, 2010
- Recorded: October 16, 2009
- Venues: Resurrection Life Church, Grandville, MI
- Genres: Gospel, R&B
- Length: 65:37
- Label: Verity/Jive
- Producer: Aaron W. Lindsey

Marvin Sapp chronology
Thirsty (2007)	Here I Am (2010)	I Win (2012)

Professional ratings
Review scores
Source	Rating
Allmusic	3.5/5 stars

Here I Am is the fifth live album and eighth overall album by Marvin Sapp as well as his first on the newly established Verity Gospel Music Group and Jive partnership. The album debuted at number 2 on the Billboard 200 with first-week sales of 76,000 copies, making it the highest charting gospel album in history.

== Track listing ==
Track number	Track title	Writer(s)	Time
1	"I Came (Intro)"	Aaron Lindsey	1:38
2	"I Came"	Marvin Sapp, Aaron Lindsey, and Keith Cistrunk	4:25
3	"Keep Holding On"	Aaron Lindsey, Dana Sorey, and Aaron Camper	4:57
4	"Fresh Wind"	Jonathan Dunn	6:19
5	"Comfort Zone"	Ted Winn, Aaron Lindsey, and Daniel Moore	4:34
6	"Wait"	Jason Hendrickson, Kenny Black, Shakira Jones, and Donella Harris	5:11
7	"He Has His Hands on You"	Stan Jones	6:31
8	"Don't Count Me Out"	Jason Nelson	5:37
9	"The Best in Me"	Marvin Sapp and Aaron Lindsey	8:34
10	"Here I Am"	Jonathan Dunn	5:48
11	"Praise You Forever"	Jarmone Davis, Bob Terry, Christopher B. Lewis, and Jerry Vines	6:29
12	"More Than a Conqueror"	Jason Hendrickson, Kenny Black, and Shakira Jones	5:34

== Credits ==
Note: Personnel is from iTunes digital booklet

=== Production ===
- Marvin Sapp – executive producer
- MaLinda Sapp – executive producer
- James "Jazzy" Jordan – executive producer
- Aaron W. Lindsey – producer
- Danny Duncan – recording
- Nick Sparks – string recording
- John Jaszcz – mixing at French Beach Studio (Franklin, Tennessee)
- Vlado Meller – mastering at Sony Music Studios (New York City, New York)

=== Vocalists ===
- Marvin Sapp – lead vocals

Backing vocals

- Myron Butler (also choir director)
- Michael Bethany
- Aisha Cleaver
- Deonis Cook
- Jamil Freeman
- Caltomeesh West
- Chelsea West

=== Musicians ===
- Parris Bowens – keyboards
- Aaron W. Lindsey – keyboards
- Buddy Strong – keyboards
- Rick Watford – guitars
- Derrick Ray Sr.– bass
- Calvin Rodgers – drums
- Javier Solis – percussion
- Bruce Vanderveen – alto saxophone, horn arrangements
- Tommy Proulx – tenor saxophone
- Joe Mason – trombone
- Mark Wells – trombone
- Dan Duncan – trumpet
- Mike Martz – trumpet
- Nashville String Machine – strings
- Lloyd Barry – string arrangements

== Charts ==
=== Weekly charts ===
Chart (2010)	Peak position
US Billboard 200	2
US Top Gospel Albums (Billboard)	1
US Top R&B/Hip-Hop Albums (Billboard)	1

=== Year-end charts ===
Chart (2010)	Position
US Billboard 200	95
US Top Gospel Albums (Billboard)	1
US Top R&B/Hip-Hop Albums (Billboard)	26

Chart (2011)	Position
US Top Gospel Albums (Billboard)	12
US Top R&B/Hip-Hop Albums (Billboard)	91

== Certifications ==
Region	Certification	Certified units/sales
United States (RIAA)	Gold	500,000^{‡}
^{‡} Sales+streaming figures based on certification alone.
