= You Shall Live =

Studio album by Marvin Sapp
- Released: June 2, 2015
- Genres: Urban contemporary gospel, traditional black gospel
- Length: 58:49
- Label: RCA Inspiration
- Producer: Aaron W. Lindsey

Marvin Sapp chronology
Christmas Card (2013)	You Shall Live (2015)	Close (2017)

You Shall Live is the tenth studio album by Marvin Sapp. RCA Inspiration released the album on June 2, 2015. Sapp worked with producer, Aaron W. Lindsey, in the making of this album.

== Critical reception ==
Professional ratings
Review scores
Source	Rating
CCM Magazine	4/5 stars
New Release Today	4/5 stars

Awarding the album four stars from CCM Magazine, Andy Argyrakis states, "even if You Shall Live took three years, it was well worth the wait thanks to the singer/songwriter/pastor's superb craftsmanship that seems to have jumped up a notch ever since 2007's gold selling 'Thirsty' and its massive crossover hit 'Never Would Have Made It"'put Sapp on the international map." Dwayne Lacy, giving the album four stars for New Release Today, writes, "You Shall Live really does not have a feel of a studio album."

== Track listing ==
You Shall Live
No.	Title	Writer(s)	Length
1.	"Greater"	Stan Jones, Aaron W. Lindsey, Marvin Sapp	4:33
2.	"Honor and Glory"	Myron Butler, Lindsey, Sapp, Robert Searight	4:56
3.	"Count on You"	Sapp, Myron Williams	5:46
4.	"Live"	Jones, Sapp	5:18
5.	"Beloved"	Jarmone Davis, Lindsey, Sapp	4:47
6.	"Yes You Can"	Davis, Chip Dixson, Sapp	4:53
7.	"The Old Rugged Cross"	Trad. arr: Lindsey, Sapp, John Stoddard	4:52
8.	"Thank Your for the Cross"	Israel Houghton, Lindsey, Sapp	7:36
9.	"Holy Spirit Overflow"	Zeke Listerbee, Sapp	6:39
10.	"Your Love Wins"	Davis, Dixson, Sapp	4:52
11.	"Praise Your Way Through"	Davis, Dixson, Sapp	4:37
Total length:			58:49

== Personnel ==
*adapted from iTunes digital booklet*

=== Backing Vocals ===
Candy West

Darian Yancey-Mackey

Chelsea West

Deonis Cook

Tiffany R. Brown

Erin Cortez

Nikki Ross

Gene Moore Jr

Chris Lawson

Dana Brown

Kieandria Ellis

=== Musicians ===
Aaron W. Lindsey- Piano/Keyboards, Organ, Bass, Programming

Michael Bereal- Keyboards

Paris Bowens- Keyboards, Programming

John Stoddart- Piano, Strings, Orchestration

Leonard Ray Jarman Jr- Piano, Keyboards

Cory Henry- Organ (only track 2)

Terrance Ruffin- Organ (only track 9)

Calvin Rodgers- Drums

Robert Searight- Drums (only track 2)

Javier Solis- Percussion

William Birckhead- Bass (only track 1)

Darrell Freeman- Bass

Derrick "Swol" Ray, Jr- Bass

Isaiah Sharkey- Guitars

Hamilton Hardin- Horns

=== Production ===
Executive Producer: Geo Bivins

Produced and Arranged by: Aaron W. Lindsey

Backing Vocals Directed and Recorded by: Myron Butler (except track 5)

Backing Vocals (for track 5 only) Recorded by: Case Mundy

Mixed by: John Jaszcz

Assistant engineer: Adam David Smith

Mastered by: Dan Shike

Production Management: Ken Johnson

A&R Executive: Joseph Burney

Marketing Executive: Cheryl Marks

Art Director: Fuko Chubachi

Photographer: Christian Lantry

== Charts ==
Chart (2015)	Peak position
US Billboard 200	40
US Top Gospel Albums (Billboard)	1
