= Marvin Sapp =

American singer-songwriter (born 1967)

Bishop Marvin Sapp
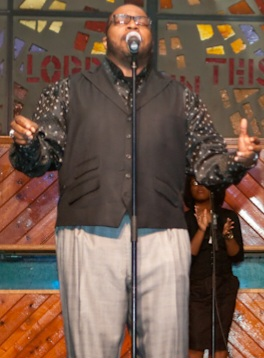
- Sapp performing in 2013
- Born: Marvin Louis Sapp; January 28, 1967 (age 59); Grand Rapids, Michigan, U.S.
- Occupations: Musician; pastor; record producer; singer; songwriter
- Spouse(s): MaLinda Prince Sapp (m. 1992, died. 2010), La'Boris Cole (m. 2026)
- Children: 3: (Marvin II; MaKaila; Madisson)
- Musical career
- Genres: Gospel; Contemporary Christian; Inspirational/Worship
- Years active: 1990–present
- Website: marvinsappmusic.com

Ordination history
History
Episcopal consecration
- Principal consecrator: Neil C. Ellis
- Co-consecrators: J. Delano Ellis, Rudolph McKissic, and Kenneth C. Ulmer

Marvin Louis Sapp (born January 28, 1967) is an American gospel musician, singer, songwriter, record producer, pastor, and bishop.

== Early life and education ==
Born and raised in Grand Rapids, Michigan, Sapp began singing in church at age four. In third grade he met MaLinda Prince, his future wife.

He was a student at the unaccredited Aenon Bible College in Indianapolis, Indiana.

== Solo career ==
In 1996, Sapp decided to establish himself as a contemporary gospel solo artist and has recorded seven albums. Sapp first achieved crossover fame with the release of "Never Would Have Made It" from the album Thirsty in 2007. It peaked at No. 14 on the U.S. Billboard Hot R&B/Hip-Hop Songs, No. 82 on the Billboard Hot 100, and also at No. 1 on the Billboard Hot Gospel Songs chart. Thirsty debuted at No. 28 on the U.S. Billboard 200, No. 4 on the U.S. Billboard Top R&B/Hip-Hop Albums, and also No. 1 on the U.S. Billboard Top Gospel Albums. It has been certified gold by the RIAA due to the album selling over 500,000 copies, making it Sapp's best selling album of his solo career, and has so far sold over 712,000 copies. In 2009, Sapp won all seven Gospel Stellar Awards that he was nominated for.

Sapp recorded Thirsty's follow-up album, Here I Am, on October 16, 2009, at Resurrection Life Church in Wyoming, Michigan and released it on March 16, 2010. With its release, Sapp became the all-time highest charting gospel artist in Billboard's 54-year history of tracking album sales. By selling approximately 76,000 copies of Here I Am its first week out, the album debuted at No. 2 on the Billboard 200 chart, making Here I Am the highest-charting album ever by a gospel artist. Here I Am's lead single, "The Best in Me," which was co-written by the album's producer, Aaron Lindsey (Israel Houghton), peaked at No. 14 on the Billboard Hot R&B/Hip-Hop Songs chart, No. 1 on Billboard's Gospel Songs chart and reached No. 20 (with a bullet) on Billboard's Urban AC chart. On January 15, 2011, Marvin Sapp topped the list of winners during the 26th Annual Stellar Gospel Music Awards

=== Ministry ===
In 2003, Sapp and his wife founded Lighthouse Full Life Center Church in Grand Rapids, Michigan. On November 17, 2019, Sapp became the senior pastor of The Chosen Vessel Church in Fort Worth, Texas.

==== Fundraising controversy ====
During his appearance at the 109th Pentecostal Assemblies of the World Convention in Baltimore, Maryland, in July 2024, Sapp called on in-person attendees and online livestream viewers to reach a US$40,000 fundraising goal. Sapp repeatedly instructed the venue's ushers to "close the doors", allegedly to prevent attendees from leaving until the goal was met. Video of the incident went viral on social media in March 2025, drawing backlash from users on Twitter and other platforms.

Sapp responded to the criticism in a March 26 statement on Facebook, claiming that the footage was taken out of context and that the doors were closed to ensure a "safe, focused, and reverent" environment for the team collecting contributions. On the March 31 edition of The Rickey Smiley Morning Show, Sapp said that he received death threats due to the controversy.

== Personal life ==
Sapp is the widower of MaLinda Prince Sapp, who served as the administrative pastor at his Lighthouse Full Life Center Church. MaLinda died September 9, 2010, from complications of colon cancer. Marvin Sapp had three children with MaLinda: Marvin L. II (b. August 30, 1994), MiKaila D. (b. September 8, 1997), and Madisson (b. June 9, 1999).

=== Stalking ===
In the early 2010s, following the death of his wife, Sapp experienced harassment from a stalker: Dr. Teleka Patrick, a resident physician who had moved from California to Kalamazoo, Michigan, to pursue Sapp. Patrick made numerous Twitter posts and YouTube videos containing romantic intentions towards Sapp, including wanting to bear children with him, but only a few of which addressed him by name directly.

On August 25, 2013, Sapp angrily attested to his service about an unnamed woman (now believed to have been Patrick) who the night prior had gone into his home uninvited and spoke to his three teenaged children. Sapp later filed a personal-protection order for him and his children with the Kent County Circuit Court, accusing Patrick of contacting him for over a year, joining his church, coming to his home, contacting his children, and making claims that he was her husband. He and his lawyer cited "[Sapp having] at least 400 pages of correspondence from [Patrick] which [he had] never responded to" as evidence, and the order was successfully issued against Patrick on September 17, 2013.

Patrick's infatuation with Sapp was later brought to media attention by a police investigation into her disappearance on December 5, 2013. Police stated that Sapp was not considered to be a suspect in the woman's disappearance, and Patrick’s death was ruled an accident following the discovery of her drowned body in a pond in Porter, Indiana, on April 16, 2014.

== Biopic ==
In April 2022, it was revealed that there would be a biopic airing on TV One in August 2022 on Marvin Sapp, entitled after Marvin's top song, "Never Would've Made It: The Marvin Sapp Story". The biopic features Chaz Lamar Shepherd who portrays Marvin and Ambre Anderson portrays Marvin's late wife, Dr. MaLinda Sapp.

== Discography ==
- Marvin Sapp (1995)
- Grace & Mercy (1997)
- Nothing Else Matters (1999)
- I Believe (2002)
- Diary of a Psalmist (2003)
- Be Exalted (2005)
- Thirsty (2007)
- Here I Am (2010)
- I Win (2012)
- You Shall Live (2015)
- Close (2017)
- Chosen Vessel (Live) (2020)
- Substance (2022)
- Then and Now (2024)
- Restoration (2026)

== Achievements and awards ==
=== Billboard Music Awards ===
Year	Nominee / Work	Award	Result
2021	Marvin Sapp, "Thank You For It All"	Top Gospel Song	Nominated

=== BET Awards ===
Year	Award	Result
2008	Best Gospel Artist	Won
2010	Best Gospel Artist	Won

=== GMA Dove Awards ===
Year	Award	Result
2008	Male Vocalist of the Year	Nominated
2009	Artist of the Year	Nominated
2009	Male Vocalist of the Year	Nominated
2011	Artist of the Year	Nominated
2011	Male Vocalist of the Year	Nominated
2011	Contemporary Gospel Recorded Song of the Year ("The Best In Me")	Won

=== Grammy Awards ===
Marvin Sapp has been nominated for 11 Grammy Awards.
