= Thirsty (Marvin Sapp album) =

Studio album by Marvin Sapp
- Released: July 12, 2007 (U.S.)
- Recorded: January 26, 2007
- Venue: Resurrection Life Church, Grandville, MI
- Length: 67:49
- Label: Verity, Zomba

Marvin Sapp chronology
Be Exalted (2005)	Thirsty (2007)	Here I Am (2010)

Professional ratings
Review scores
Source	Rating
Allmusic	3/5 stars

Thirsty is the seventh album by Marvin Sapp and his fourth release on Verity Records. The album was commercially successful, peaking at number 28 on the U.S. Billboard 200, number 4 on the Top R&B/Hip-Hop Albums, and number 1 on the Top Gospel Albums chart. It was certified Gold by the Recording Industry Association of America (RIAA) on July 9, 2008 and has sold over 712,000 copies as of March 2010. On January 31, 2020, the album was certified Platinum by the RIAA, for 1 million units, making it Marvin Sapp's best selling album of his solo career and one of the best-selling gospel albums of all time.

The song "Praise Him in Advance" was featured on the first disc of the 2010 gospel compilation album WOW Gospel 2010.

== Track listing ==
Track number	Track title	Writer(s)	Time
1	"Magnify"	Aaron Lindsey and Martha Munizzi	4:55
2	"Power"	Dana Sorey and Aaron Camper	4:58
3	"Possess the Land"	Darrell Freeman and Myron Butler	4:57
4	"Shout Unto God"	Aaron Lindsey	5:02
5	"Praise Him in Advance (Intro)"	Deon Kipping	1:00
6	"Praise Him in Advance"	Deon Kipping	5:26
7	"Worshipper In Me"	Jonathan Dunn	8:25
8	"Thirsty"	Jason Nelson	6:25
9	"Thirsty (Reprise)"	Jason Nelson	5:22
10	"Place of Worship"	Jason Nelson	3:34
11	"In the Garden"	Charles Austin Miles	3:39
12	"Never Would Have Made It"	Matthew Brownie and Marvin Sapp	6:56
13	"Rivers Flow"	Jonathan Dunn	7:10

== Credits ==
Producers:

- Aaron Lindsey - Audio Production, Horn Producer, Producer
- Terrance Jones - Audio Production, Production Assistant
- Vinnie Ciesielski - Audio Production, Horn Producer
- Danny Duncan - Audio Production, Orchestra Production
- Jim Gray - Audio Production, Orchestra Production
- Adrian M. Lindsey - Audio Production, Production Assistant
- Keith Pace - Assistant Engineer, Production Assistant

Executive Producers:

- James Jordan
- MaLinda Sapp
- Marvin Sapp

Arrangers:

- Marvin Sapp
- Aaron Lindsey - Horn Arrangements, Vocal Arrangement
- Myron Butler Vocal Arrangement

A&R Director:

- Joseph Burney

Worship Leader:

- Marvin Sapp - Worship leader

Musicians:

- Calvin Rodgers – Drums
- Javier Solis – Percussion
- Roy Agee – Trombone
- Jimmy Bolin – Saxophone
- Derrick Horne – Guitar
- Jerry Harris Jr. – Keyboards
- Aaron Lindsey – Keyboards
- Vinnie Ciesielski – Trumpet
- Matthew Brownie - Organ
- Derrick Ray – Bass
- Tim Stewart - Guitar
- Arthur Strong - Keyboards, Organ
- Asian Philharmonic - Orchestra

Vocals:

- Myron Butler - Vocal Director
- Aisha Cleavers
- Deonis Cook
- Daniel Johnson
- Caltomeesh West
- Chelsea West
- Jamil Whiting

Engineers

- Danny Duncan - Audio Engineer, Engineer
- Ed Ensink - Audio Engineer, Monitor Engineer
- Chris Godbey - Mixing
- Eric Hartman - Engineer
- Israel Ruiz - Audio Engineer
- Aaron Lindsey - Digital Editing, Overdub Engineer, Vocal Engineer
- Vlado Meller - Mastering
- Travis Neuman - Audio Engineer, Monitor Engineer
- Keith Pace - Assistant Engineer, Digital Editing
- Cliff Rosenberg - Assistant Engineer, Audio Engineer
- Chris Yoakum - Horn Engineer
- Zhu 'Jerry' Feng - Audio Engineer, Assistant Engineer
- Lu Di -Concert Master
- Ken Johnson "Snakehips" & His West Indian Dance Band - Production Coordination
- Li Peng - Assistant Concertmaster

== Charts ==
=== Weekly charts ===
Chart (2007–08)	Peak position
US Billboard 200	28
US Top Gospel Albums (Billboard)	1
US Top R&B/Hip-Hop Albums (Billboard)	4

=== Year-end charts ===
Chart (2007)	Position
US Top Gospel Albums (Billboard)	8
Chart (2008)	Position
US Billboard 200	91
US Top Gospel Albums (Billboard)	1
US Top R&B/Hip-Hop Albums (Billboard)	17
Chart (2009)	Position
US Top Gospel Albums (Billboard)	3
US Top R&B/Hip-Hop Albums (Billboard)	69
Chart (2025)	Position
US Top Gospel Albums (Billboard)	46

=== Decade-end charts ===
Chart (2000–2009)	Peak position
US Top Gospel Albums (Billboard)	7

== Singles ==
Year	Title	Chart positions	
Year	Title	US	US R&B
2008	"Never Would Have Made It"	82	14

"Never Would Have Made It" ranked number 62 on BET's top 100 videos of 2008.
