= Percy Bady =

American singer

- Also known as: Bad Bady
- Genres: Gospel, R&B, Soul, Pop
- Occupations: Singer, musician, songwriter, producer
- Instruments: Keyboards, vocals
- Years active: 1975–present

Percy Bady is an American singer, keyboardist, arranger, songwriter and record producer.

== Biography ==
Bady was involved in 26 platinum and gold records. In 2003, he released his first solo album, The Percy Bady Experience, which reached No. 22 on the Top Gospel Albums.

In 2012, Bady signed a record deal with Maranatha! Music. In 2013, he released his second solo album, Kingdom Inspirations, which charted No. 17 on the Top Gospel Albums and No. 35 on the Top Heatseekers. His single "I Won't Give Up" charted No. 22 the same year. In 2014, he gained a Grammy Award nomination for his song "Still" (feat. Lowell Pye) in the category 'Best Gospel Song'.

== Awards ==
- 1999: GMA Dove Award – (Won)
- 2008: Stellar Award – 'Song of the Year' (Nomination)
- 2014: Grammy Award – "Still" for 'Best Gospel Song' (Nomination)

== Discography ==
- 2003 – The Percy Bady Experience
- 2013 – Kingdom Inspirations
