= Je'Caryous Johnson =

American playwright, actor, producer, director

- Born: Je'Caryous F. Johnson; May 26, 1977 (age 49); Houston, Texas, U.S.
- Education: University of Houston (BA); Prairie View A&M University
- Occupations: Film producer; director; playwright; author; actor
- Years active: 1998–present
- Website: jecaryous.com

Je' Caryous Johnson (born May 26, 1977) is an American stage and film producer, author, playwright and director known for his Off-Broadway stage productions in the urban theater circuit. He is also known for his work of adapting stage plays from various classic urban novels such as Michael Baisden's books Men Cry in the Dark (2002) and Maintenance Man (2003) and Eric Jerome Dickey's Friends and Lovers (2004). He has also adapted films such as Two Can Play That Game (2017), Set It Off (2018) and New Jack City (2022). Johnson is the author of the urban fiction novel Men, Money, and Gold Diggers, is a four-time national championship playwright, and became an honoree recipient of the NAACP Trailblazer Award in 2007.

Je'Caryous has also been acknowledged as the first producer to adapt an African-American romance novel into a stage theater production.

== Early life ==
Je'Caryous Johnson was born May 26, 1977, in Houston, Texas in the Northwestern Studewood neighborhood. He attended the James D. Burrus Magnet school for Fine Arts, studying theater. Johnson was the winner of multiple nationwide playwriting contests, including one that gained him a first place medal for playwriting about the Harlem Renaissance at the National History Day playwriting competition held at the Kennedy Center, Washington, D.C in 1996.

== Education ==
Johnson attended Prairie View A&M University, and later enrolled at the University of Houston, where he majored in theater and graduated with a Bachelor's degree in Fine Arts.

== Career ==
As a resident of Hollywood, California, Johnson was theatrically trained by August Wilson, Edward Albee, and Jose Quintero upon graduating from college. He later moved back to Texas in 1998, investing, developing, and founding his own theatrical company with his uncle Gary Guidry in 1995 called I'm Ready Productions.

In 2002 he collaborated with urban novelist Michael Baisden to adapt his novel Men Cry in the Dark into a stage play. After its success, hoping to make Houston the new 'Hollywood', he began to adapt more urban novels into stage productions, including the romance novel Friends and Lovers by Eric Jerome Dickey.

In 2007 Johnson and Guidry became the recipients of the NAACP Trailblazer Award, given to individuals in the entertainment industry whose outstanding theatrical contributions paved the way for future actors, playwrights, and producers. They are among honorees such as stage producer and filmmaker Tyler Perry, who was given the award in 2006 and David E. Talbert, who was awarded in 2008.

Many of Johnson's stage productions feature repeat cast actors similar to the likes of Spike Lee and Tyler Perry-esque casting style, where they repeatedly use the same actors in multiple films and productions. He consistently casts Vivica A. Fox, Billy Dee Williams, Allen Payne, Tichina Arnold, Leon, Wendy Raquel Robinson, Carl Anthony Payne II, Brian McKnight, Brian White, and Shirley Murdock.

Most of Johnson's live tapings of stage productions, as well as his independent films, were released and made for direct-to-video DVD and video on demand streaming. And, as Tyler Perry had done with his productions, Johnson stamped his trademark name before the title of the play or film. (I.E.: Je'Caryous Johnson presents…).

His production company would later be renamed to Je'Caryous Johnson Entertainment, where new projects such as comedy showcases and music concerts would add to the roster of shows he had already begun to produce and tour nationally. He continues the legacy of the former production name I'm Ready Productions in his charitable organization for the performing arts, revamped as the I'm Ready Foundation.

In the late 2010s he started adapting classic urban films into live stage adaptations. In 2017, he adapted the 2001 film Two Can Play That Game and cast Vivica A. Fox to reprise her lead role as 'Shante Smith'. In 2018, Johnson began to collaborate with Warner Bros. Theater Ventures to produce live-action stage adaptations of urban films from their vault, starting with the 1996 cult film Set It Off, casting Da Brat, Kyla Pratt, LeToya Luckett, and Demetria McKinney for the first production run. The play returned by popular demand in 2020/2021 with Da Brat returning as 'Cleo' along with a new cast lineup. Je'Caryous continued to collaborate with Warner Bros. in 2022 with the live-action stage adaptation of 1991 cult classic film New Jack City, in which he cast Allen Payne to reprise his role as 'Gee Money'. Also in his New Jack City, were Treach as 'Nino Brown', Big Daddy Kane, Flex Alexander, and Gary Dourdan.

In 2019 Matthew Knowles, creator of the Grammy winning pop group Destiny's Child, started to collaborate with Johnson to develop a Broadway stage musical titled Survivor: The Destiny's Child Musical, which would chronicle the groups' journey and rise to fame. The pair had ideas of making its debut in London's West End, as well as a national and overseas tour. The show was allegedly going to make its debut in 2020; however, it was reportedly placed on hold due to the COVID-19 pandemic.

Johnson is currently in development of various theatrical productions slated to tour. He partnered with Marvin Gaye III to write and produce a Broadway musical titled Marvin Gaye: The Musical, which chronicles the life and times of Marvin Gaye, originally slated to open in 2023, but since delayed. He was also working on a live-action stage adaptation of the 1997 comedy film B.A.P.S., which has also been delayed. However, in early 2024, Johnson's production of New Jack City returned on tour by popular demand, casting Omar Gooding in the role of Stone. In February 2024, it was announced that Johnson, along with daughter of Rick James, Ty James, had launched a nationwide tour of the musical production of Super Freak: The Rick James Story, which was set to commence in the spring of 2024.

== Personal life ==
Je'Caryous Johnson married Meaghan Chrystal Roberts, a licensed entertainment attorney in California, on November 15, 2014.

He and his wife developed Je'Caryous Johnson's: I'm Ready Foundation, an organization dedicated to teaching and positively changing people through the arts. They both, along with his mother Manon Roberts, serve on its board of directors.

== Filmography ==
=== Film ===
As producer, writer and actor
Year	Titile	Notes	Ref.
2003	Men Cry in the Dark	Executive Producer, DVD Release; VOD	
2004	The Maintenance Man	Role: Eric	
2008	Whatever She Wants		
2010	Three Ways to Get a Husband	DVD release, VOD	
2011	Cheaper to Keep Her	Direct to DVD release, VOD	
2013	For Love or Money	Direct to DVD release, VOD	
2014	Men, Money & Gold Diggers	Role: Caleb; Writer and Producer;	
2020	The Sin Choice	Producer, writer	
2021	Christmas with My Ex	Producer	
2022	Stranger Next Door	Executive Producer	

=== Television ===
Year	Title	Role	Ref.
2018	The Real Housevives of Atlanta	Himself (Episode: Driving Ms. Kim)	
2015	Unsung Hollywood	Himself (Episode: Vivica A. Fox)	

== Productions ==
=== Theater ===
As playwright and producer
Year	Stage Production Title	Opening Date	Closing Date	Notes	Ref.
2002	Men Cry in the Dark: The Stageplay	January 2002	November 2005	Based on the novel of the same name by Michael Baisden	
2003	The Maintenance Man	April 2003	April 2003	Role: Eric; DVD Release (2004) Based on the novel of the same name by Michael Baisden	
2004	Friends and Lovers	March 2005	March 2005	Based on the novel by Eric Jerome Dickey	
2006	Cheaters: The Stageplay	N/A	N/A	DVD Release, VOD	
2006	Whatever She Wants: The Stageplay	May 1, 2007	May 6, 2007	DVD Release, VOD	
2006, 2010	Casino / Confessions	October 29, 2010	November 21, 2010	Co-Writer with 'I'm Ready Productions'	
2006	Men, Money and Gold Diggers	November 14, 2006	November 19, 2006	Role: Caleb; DVD Release (2014);VOD; later was adapted into an urban novel published by Je'Caryous Johnson	
2007	Shackin' Up	October 4, 2007	Obctober 6, 2007	DVD Release, VOD	
2015	Things Your Man Won't Do	March 12, 2015	November 2015	DVD Release, VOD	
2016	Married...But Single	March 11, 2016	May 8, 2016	DVD Release, VOD	
2017	Married...But Single Too	April 2, 2017	April 2, 2017	DVD Release, VOD	
2017	Two Can Play That Game: The Stageplay	October 13, 2017	November 12, 2017	Based on the 2001 film Two Can Play That Game	
2018	Redemption of a Dogg	October 5, 2018	November 18, 2018	DVD Release, VOD Semi-Biographical musical play based on Snoop Dogg's newfound experience as 'Snoop Lion'	
2020–2021	Set It Off: Live On Stage	March 9, 2018	November 20, 2021	Based on the 1996 film Set It Off	
2022–2024	New Jack City: Live on Stage	October 29–30, 2022 (preview) November 2022 (Tour)	June 15, 2024 *expected closing date unless extended	Based on the 1991 film New Jack City, Produced with special arrangements by Warner Bros. Theater Ventures	
2024	Super Freak: The Rick James Story	March 14, 2024 (Nationwide Tour)	June 8, 2024 *expected closing date unless extended	Theatrical musical based on the life of Rick James Stokely Williams of Mint Condition stars as James.	
2025	Jason's Lyric: Live!	February 13, 2025 (Nationwide Tour)	May 4, 2025	Based on the 1994 Metro-Goldwin-Mayer film Jason's Lyric.	
2025	Games Women Play	February 2025	February 2025	Directed by Carl Anthony Payne. Starring Jill Marie Jones, Carl Payne, Flex Alexander, Demetria McKinney, Brian White, Claudia Jordan, Chico Bean and Apryl Jones.	
Future dates	B.A.P.S.: Live on Stage	To be announced *postponed	To be determined	In development, Based on the 1997 film B.A.P.S.	
Future dates	Marvin Gaye: The Musical	To be announced	To be determined	In development for Broadway	
Future dates	Power of Love: The Luther Vandross Story	To be announced	To be determined	In development for Broadway	
Future dates	Destiny's Child: The Musical	To be announced	To be determined	Upcoming project, production in development Chronicling the career of pop sensation Destiny's Child	
Future dates	Waiting to Exhale: The Musical	To be announced	To be determined	Upcoming project, production in development. Based on the 1995 film Waiting To Exhale	
Future dates	The Hippest Wizard of Oz	To be announced	To be determined	Upcoming project, production in development	

=== Concerts and specials ===
==== As executive producer ====
- Certified Crazy Comedy Tour (2015)
- Monica & K. Michelle: The Love and Commitment Affair (2019)
- The Memorial Weekend Music Festival: feat. Tank, K. Michelle & Keyshia Cole (2019)
- Keyshia Cole & Elle Varner: Live in Concert (2019)
- Cedric the Entertainer and Friends: feat. Keyshia Cole & Carl Payne (2019)
- Lil Baby & Friends (2021)
- Valentine's Love Jam: SWV feat. Case (2022)
- Festival of Praise: feat. Fred Hammond, Israel Houghton and Hezekiah Walker (2022)
- No Cap Comedy Tour (2022)
- We Outside Comedy Tour feat. Michael Blackson, Karlous Miller, Kid Capri, Bill Bellamy, Tony Rock, J.J. Williamson, Ryan Davis & Kelly Kelz (2022)
- Corinne Bailey Rae: Black Rainbows Tour (2023)
- Labor Day Weekend Celebration – Anthony Hamilton feat. The TON3S and TMF (2023)
- Gregory Porter & Dominique Hammons feat. Major (2023)
- Heart & Soul Concert Series feat. Gregory Porter & Will Downing: Live in Concert (2023)
- Heart & Soul Concert Series feat. PJ Morton & Maeta: Live in Concert (2023)
- Heart & Soul Concert Series feat. Erykah Badu, PJ Morton & Raheem DeVaughn (2023)
- Monica feat. Joe & K. Michelle (2023)
- Heart & Soul Concert Series feat. Marsha Ambrosius & LeVelle (2023)
- Ladies Choice Concert Series feat. Eric Bellinger, Kevin Ross & J Brown (2023)
- Christmas in the 44 feat. Le'Andria Johnson, Joshua Rogers, Crystal Aikin, Tasha Page-Lockhart, Dathan Thigpen, Stephanie Summers, Geoffrey Golden & Amber Bullock w/special guest appearance by Zacardi Cortez (2023)
- Kem and Chanté Moore: Live in Concert (2024)

== Novels ==
- Men, Money and Gold Diggers Grand Central Publishing, ISBN 978-0-4465531-4-8
- I'm a Good Man, You're a Good Woman ... Why Can't We Find Each Other I'm Ready Publishing, ISBN 978-0-9787301-9-2

== Awards and nominations ==
NAACP Theatre Award/NAACP Image Awards

Year	Recipient(s)	Award	Result	Ref.
2007	Je'Caryous Johnson & Gary Guidry	Trailblazer Award	Honorees	
