= Crystal Aikin (album) =

Studio album by Crystal Aikin
- Released: January 13, 2009
- Recorded: 2008
- Genre: Gospel
- Label: Sony Verity
- Producer: PAJAM, Dre & Vidal, Gerald Haddon, Cainon Lamb, Taurian Osbourne, Derek Clark, Asaph Ward

Professional ratings
Review scores
Source	Rating
AllMusic	
GospelFlava	
Soul Tracks	

Crystal Aikin is the debut album by Sunday Best first season winner, Crystal Aikin. The album was released on January 13, 2009, in the United States.

== Recording ==
After winning the first season of Sunday Best on December 4, 2007, Aikin signed a recording contract with Zomba Gospel. She started her first album, which was produced by PAJAM, Dre & Vidal, Asaph Ward, and others.

== Track listing ==
Information is based on Liner notes

No.	Title	Writer(s)	Producer(s)	Length
1.	"I Desire More"	Asaph A. Ward	Asaph A. Ward	4:18
2.	"What If (He Said No)"	Paul D. Allen, James Moss	PAJAM	4:07
3.	"He's So Worthy"	Andrea Harris, Asaph A. Ward	Asaph A. Ward	4:06
4.	"A Song About Jesus"	Kirk Franklin	Kirk Franklin, Harold Martin	5:24
5.	"Lord, You Reign Forever"	Andre Harris, Vidal Davis, Bryan “BJ” Sledge	Andre Harris & Vidal Davis	4:21
6.	"Love Him"	Cainon Lamb, Harold Lilly, Taurian Osbourne	Cainon Lamb, Taurian "TJ" Osbourne	3:51
7.	"The Clouds"	Derek Clark, Benji Demps, Keyondra Lockett	Derek Clark	4:12
8.	"Turn To Him"	Gordon Chambers, Vidal Davis, Andre Harris	Andre Harris & Vidal Davis	3:49
9.	"Even Me"	Gerald Haddon, Tammi Haddon	Gerald Haddon	4:36
10.	"Breathe On Me" (featuring Natalie Grant)	Natalie Grant, Robert Lowry, Annie S. Hawkins	Bernie Herms	5:47

Note

- PAJAM is Paul D. Allen, J. Moss & Walter Kearney.

== Personnel ==
Information is adapted from Allmusic

Musicians

- Crystal Aikin - Lead Vocals
- Paul "PDA" Allen - Various Instruments
- Shawn Amos - Piano, Organ played by
- Faith Anderson - Background Vocals
- Minon Bolton - Background Vocals
- Jimmy Bowland - Tenor Sax, Baritone Sax
- Eddie Brown - Organ played by
- Myron Butler - Background Vocals
- Maurice Carter - Choir Member, Additional Vocals
- Vinnie Ciesielski - Trumpet
- Derek Clark - Drums, Keyboards
- Aisha Cleaver - Background Vocals
- Deonis "Pumah" Cook - Background Vocals
- Idris Davis - Bass played by
- Vidal Davis - Various Instruments
- Doriel Demps - Background Vocals
- Errol Dixon - Background Vocals
- DeBette Draper - Background Vocals
- Ethan Farmer - Bass Guitar
- Darrell Freeman - Bass played by
- Andrew Gouché - Bass played by
- Natalie Grant - Lead Vocals (10)
- Barry Green - Trombone
- Gerald Haddon - Piano
- Andre Harris - Various Instruments
- Andrea Harris - Background Vocals
- Andrew Harris - Background Vocals
- Bernie Herms - Fender Rhodes Piano
- Chris Johnson - Drums
- Jamar Jones - Strings played by
- Adam Lester - Guitar
- Keyondra Lockett - Background Vocals
- Harold Martin - Additional Music performed by
- Tim Mole - Guitar
- J. Moss - Various Instruments, Background Vocals
- Nashville String Machine - Strings played by
- PAJAM's String Orchestra - Strings played by
- LeAnne Palmore - Choir Member, Additional Vocals
- Steve Patrick - Trumpet
- Christine Richardson - Choir Member, Additional Vocals
- Crystal Rucker - Background Vocals
- Wendell "Pops" Sewell - Guitar
- San Stancil - Choir Member, Additional Vocals
- Rachel Stokes - Background Vocals
- Asaph A. Ward - Piano, Keyboards
- Miranda C. Ward - Background Vocals
- Jason Webb - Piano, Hammond B3 Organ
- Caltomeesh West - Background Vocals
- Chelsea West - Background Vocals
- Scott Williamson - Drums
- Jerard Woods - Choir Member, Additional Vocals
- Jovaun Woods - Choir Member, Additional Vocals
- Daphanie Wright - Background Vocals

Technical

- Paul "PDA" Allen - Audio Mixing
- Monica Bacon - A&R, Production Coordination
- Joe Baldridge - Recording Engineer
- Lloyd Barry - Musical Arrangement, Horn Arrangement
- Andrew Bazinet - Assistant Engineer
- Brian Bradley - Recording Engineer, Assistant Engineer
- Travis Brigman - Recording Engineer
- Kasey Burdick - Recording Engineer
- Jeff Cain - Music Editing
- Anson Dawkins - Musical Arrangement
- Bill Deaton - Audio Mixing
- Matt Desando - Recording Engineer
- Vincent Dilorenzo - Audio Mixing
- Grant Greene - Recording Engineer, Assistant Engineer, Mixing Assistant
- Gerald Haddon - Recording Engineer
- Andrea Harris - Recording Engineer
- Andrew Harris - Production Assistant, Assistant Engineer
- Eric Hartman - Recording Engineer, Assistant Engineer
- Bernie Herms - Musical Arrangement, String Arrangement, Vocal Recording Engineer
- Kent Holmes - Assistant Engineer
- John Jaszcz - Audio Mixing
- Walter Kearney - Production Supervisor
- Harold Lilly - Vocal Producer
- Erik Madrid - Recording Engineer, Assistant Engineer
- Jonathan Merritt - Recording Engineer, Assistant Engineer
- J. Moss - Musical Arrangement, Orchestral Arrangement
- Tre Nagella - Recording Engineer
- JD Shuff - Assistant Engineer
- Nick Sparks - Horns Recording Engineer
- Brian Springer - Recording Engineer
- Mike Tsafati - Recording Engineer
- James Waddell - Strings Recording Engineer

== Chart performance ==
The album peaked at #127 on the Billboard 200 and #3 on Billboard's Gospel Albums chart.
