= Shari Addison =

American gospel musician and artist (born 1962)

- Also known as: Shari Ann Moore; Shari Ann Seals; Shari Ann Addison
- Born: July 7, 1962 (age 63); Chicago, Illinois
- Genres: Gospel, traditional black gospel, urban contemporary gospel
- Occupations: Singer, songwriter
- Instruments: Vocals, singer-songwriter
- Years active: 2009–present
- Labels: Verity, Zomba, BET

Shari Ann Addison (born July 7, 1962), is an American gospel musician and artist. Shari is the first runner-up on Sunday Best She started her music career, in 2009 with the release of Shari Addison by Verity Records, Zomba Records, and BET Records. This album was her breakthrough on the Billboard magazine charts, which it placed on The Billboard 200 and Gospel Albums charts.

== Early life ==
Addison was born in Chicago, Illinois on July 7, 1962.

== Music career ==
She was on season one of Sunday Best that she finished runner-up to Crystal Aikin. Her music recording career started in 2009, with the release of Shari Addison by Verity Records, Zomba Records, and BET Records on January 13, 2009. This album was her breakthrough release on the Billboard magazine charts, placing at No. 176 on The Billboard 200 along with No. 5 on the Gospel Albums. Both AllMusic and Cross Rhythms reviewed the album.

== Personal life ==
Addison is married to Lewis Addison, and together they reside in Chicago, Illinois, and she has four daughters.

== Discography ==
=== Studio albums ===
List of studio albums, with selected chart positions
Title	Album details	Peak chart positions	
Title	Album details	US	US Gos
Shari Addison	Released: January 13, 2009; Label: Verity/Zomba/BET; CD, digital download	176	5
