= Sunday Best season 4 =

Sunday Best
- Season 4
- Starring: Kirk Franklin; Donnie McClurkin; Erica Campbell; Tina Campbell; Kim Burrell
- No. of episodes: 12

Release
- Original network: BET

Season chronology
- ← Previous; Season 3 Next → Season 5

Sunday Best is a gospel-singing reality television competition on BET.

The fourth season of Sunday Best saw the removal of Yolanda Adams as a judge and the Returning of Erica as a judge. Season 4 of Sunday Best began auditioning/taping in March 2011. The season began airing in July 2011 and concluded on September 11, 2011.

Season 4's finalists were Michael Pugh, Andrea Helms and Amber Bullock, who was crowned the winner during the two-hour season finale. The two-hour finale show featured performances from gospel music artists Pastor Shirley Caesar, former Sunday Best judge Yolanda Adams, gospel duo Lecrae, and singers VaShawn Mitchell, Zebulon Ellis, Jessica Reedy and Rance Allen, and the winners of the first three seasons of Sunday Best. Bullock, who is from St. Louis, Missouri, was awarded a new Ford Explorer, a recording contract and the "Sunday Best" title.
