= Ethan Farmer =

American bassist (born 1975)

- Born: May 31, 1975 (age 50); Chicago, Illinois, United States
- Genres: Gospel, pop, R&B, funk, rock, fusion, jazz, Latin
- Occupation(s): Musician, songwriter, record producer
- Instrument(s): Bass, keyboard/synth bass, piano, guitar, drums, vocal, backing vocals
- Years active: 1998–present

Ethan Diante Farmer (born May 31, 1975), also known as "EBASSMAN", is an American bassist, and played on the releases of Grammy Award-winning artists including Aretha Franklin (Aretha Franklin Sings the Great Diva Classics), Sean Combs (Press Play) and Janet Jackson (Live in Hawaii), among other artists, in addition to touring with The Backstreet Boys and New Kids on the Block. He's also worked with Babyface, Destiny’s Child, Janet Jackson, Justin Timberlake, Lionel Richie, Nicole Scherzinger, Patti LaBelle and Rock N Roll Hall inductee Chip Shearin in the Avengers, in addition to others, on numerous studio sessions and tour dates. In addition, he has released a solo album, Wine & Strings and Wine & Strings 2.0, a followup to the original album and includes elements of jazz, rock, funk, and soul. He was also a member of the house band of Rock the Cradle, an MTV reality show that featured the children of pop, rock and R&B stars.

== Early life and career ==
Farmer began playing the bass at six years of age with his family’s Chicago, Illinois band, The Amazing Farmer Singers, a gospel quartet. However, he did not become interested in pursuing it professionally until high school, when he realized he could make a living at it. Farmer graduated in 1993 from Hubbard High School on Chicago’s south side.

Farmer credits his upbringing in Chicago for expanding his horizons past gospel and exposing him to rock, jazz and blues. He moved to Los Angeles in 1998, and credits gospel bass performer Andrew Gouche for mentoring him when and helping him to appear on BET’s Planet Groove, playing with Jody Watley (which would be his first national appearance). Since then, he’s played with Christina Aguilera and Macy Gray among others as a session musician, in addition to releasing his own solo albums and touring with groups and musical artists. He was also featured on MTV’s Rock the Cradle as a member of its house band. Other notable acts Farmer’s worked with include Babyface, Destiny’s Child, Janet Jackson, Justin Timberlake, Lionel Richie, Nicole Scherzinger, Patti LaBelle as well as the jazz band The Avengers, among others.. In addition, he’s given masterclasses at the 2015 London Bass Guitar Show.

Farmer has endorsements from Aguilar Amplification, Carvin Bass Guitars, Dunlop Strings, Levy’s Leathers, Performance Bass Guitars and Warrior Bass. Bass Mods also sells two bass guitars endorsed by Farmer, the Ethan Farmer Signature Model EF4 and EF5.

== Credits ==
- Adrian B. King, Well Done (Bass)
- Aloe Blacc, Lift Your Spirit (Bass)
- Aretha Franklin, Sings the Great Diva Classics (Bass)
- The Anointed Pace Sisters, Access Granted (Bass)
- Babyface, Playlist (Bass)
- Bethany Devine, Daily Confessions (Bass)
- Big K.R.I.T., Cadillactica (Bass)
- Brandon Flowers, The Desired Effect (Bass)
- Brent Jones, Brent Jones & The T.P. Mobb (Bass)
- Darius Rucker, Back to Then (Bass)
- Carly Rae Jepsen, E•MO•TION (Bass)
- Christina Aguilera, Back to Basics: Live and Down Under (Bass), Stripped Live in the U.K. (Bass)
- Crystal Aikin, Crystal Aikin (Bass)
- Dave Koz, The Dance (Bass)
- Deborah Cox, The Morning After (Deborah Cox album) (Bass), Ultimate Deborah Cox (Composer)
- Diddy, Press Play (Arranger, Bass)
- Dorinda Clark-Cole, Rose of Gospel (Bass)
- Earnest Pugh, Live: Rain on Us (Guitar, Bass), Earnestly Yours (Bass)
- The Gospel Wonders, The Gospel Wonders (Bass)
- Iyanla Van Zant, In the Meantime: The Music That Tells the Story (Bass)
- JoAnn Rosario, Now More Than Ever…Worship (Guitar, Bass)
- Jody Watley, Saturday Night Experience, Vol. 1 (Bass)
- Karen Clark, Sheard 2nd Chance (Bass)
- Kelly Price, Sing Pray Love, Vol. 1: Sing (Bass)
- Kim Burrell, Love Album (Bass)
- Kirk Franklin, Kirk Franklin Presents 1NC (Guitar, Bass)
- Larry Callahan, The Evolution II (Bass)
- Lilly Mack Singers, Lilly Mack Sing-A-Long Series: Sunday Afternoon (Bass)
- Macy Gray, The Way (Bass, Composer)
- Mary Mary, Incredible (Bass)
- Mark Hubbard, He's up There (Bass)
- Melvin Taylor, Dirty Pool (Bass)
- Michael Speaks, Praise at Your Own Risk (Bass)
- Michelle Williams, Unexpected (Bass)
- Onitsha, Church Girl (Bass, Composer)
- RL, RL: Ements (Bass)
- Ruben Studdard, I Need an Angel (Bass)
- Siedah Garrett, Siedah (Bass)
- Terri Walker, Untitled (Bass, Composer)
- Tom Middleton, Sounds of the Cosmos (Bass)
- Vanessa L. Williams, Real Thing (Bass)
- Wayne Baker Brooks, Tricks Up My Sleeves EP (Arranger, Bass, Producer)

== Discography ==
- Wine & Strings, 2011
- Across the Heartland (Single), 2015
- Farmer's Vineyard, 2015
