= Life Everlasting =

Life Everlasting or Everlasting Life may refer to:

- Immortality, the ability to live forever
  - Eternal life (Christianity), a Christian belief
- Life Everlasting (Corelli novel), a 1911 novel by Marie Corelli
- Life Everlasting (Keller novel), a 1934 novel by David H. Keller
- Everlasting Life, a 1998 album by Kim Burrell

== See also ==
- Eternal life (disambiguation)
