= I'll Keep Holding On (disambiguation) =

"I'll Keep Holding On" is a 1965 song by The Marvelettes.

I’ll Keep Holding On or I Keep Holding On may also refer to:

- "I'll Keep Holding On" (Simply Red song), or "Holding Back The Years", a 1985 song by Simply Red
- I'll Keep Holding On (Just To Your Love), a 1965 album and song by Sonny James
- I'll Keep Holding On, 1978 and 1990 albums by Myrna Summers
- "I'll Keep Holding On", a 1966 song by The Action
- "I'll Keep Holding On", a 1984 song by Jim Capaldi
- "I'll Keep Holding On", a song by Kim Burrell from the 1998 album Everlasting Life
- "I'll Keep Holding On", a song by The Detroit Cobras from the 1998 album Mink, Rat or Rabbit

== See also ==
- Keep Holding On (disambiguation)
