= Mean What You Say =

Mean What You Say may refer to:

- Mean What You Say (Philly Joe Jones album)
- Mean What You Say (Thad Jones/Pepper Adams Quintet album)
- Mean What You Say (Witness album)
- Mean What You Say (Sent by Ravens album)
