= Sunday Best season 3 =

Sunday Best
- Season 3
- Starring: Kirk Franklin (host); Donnie McClurkin; Tina Campbell; Yolanda Adams (judges); Kim Burrell (mentor)

Release
- Original network: BET

Season chronology
- ← Previous; Season 2 Next → Season 4

Sunday Best is a gospel-singing reality television competition on BET.

The season aired from April 4, 2010, with the first ever auditions taking place in Lagos, Nigeria.

The third season saw the series' first major overhaul of the judging panel, with Donnie McClurkin and Yolanda Adams replacing Bebe Winans and Erica Campbell. Kirk Franklin and Tina Campbell returned as host and judge, respectively. Kim Burrell also returned as the contestants' mentor.

Le'Andria Johnson, 27, was crowned the third season's winner, over finalist Elder Goldwire McLendon, 79, on June 20, 2010. More than 2 million Americans voted during the season 3 finale to crown Johnson the winner. Johnson, a 27-year-old mother of three at the time of her win, was awarded a recording contract and a 2010 Ford SHO.
