= Y'Anna Crawley =

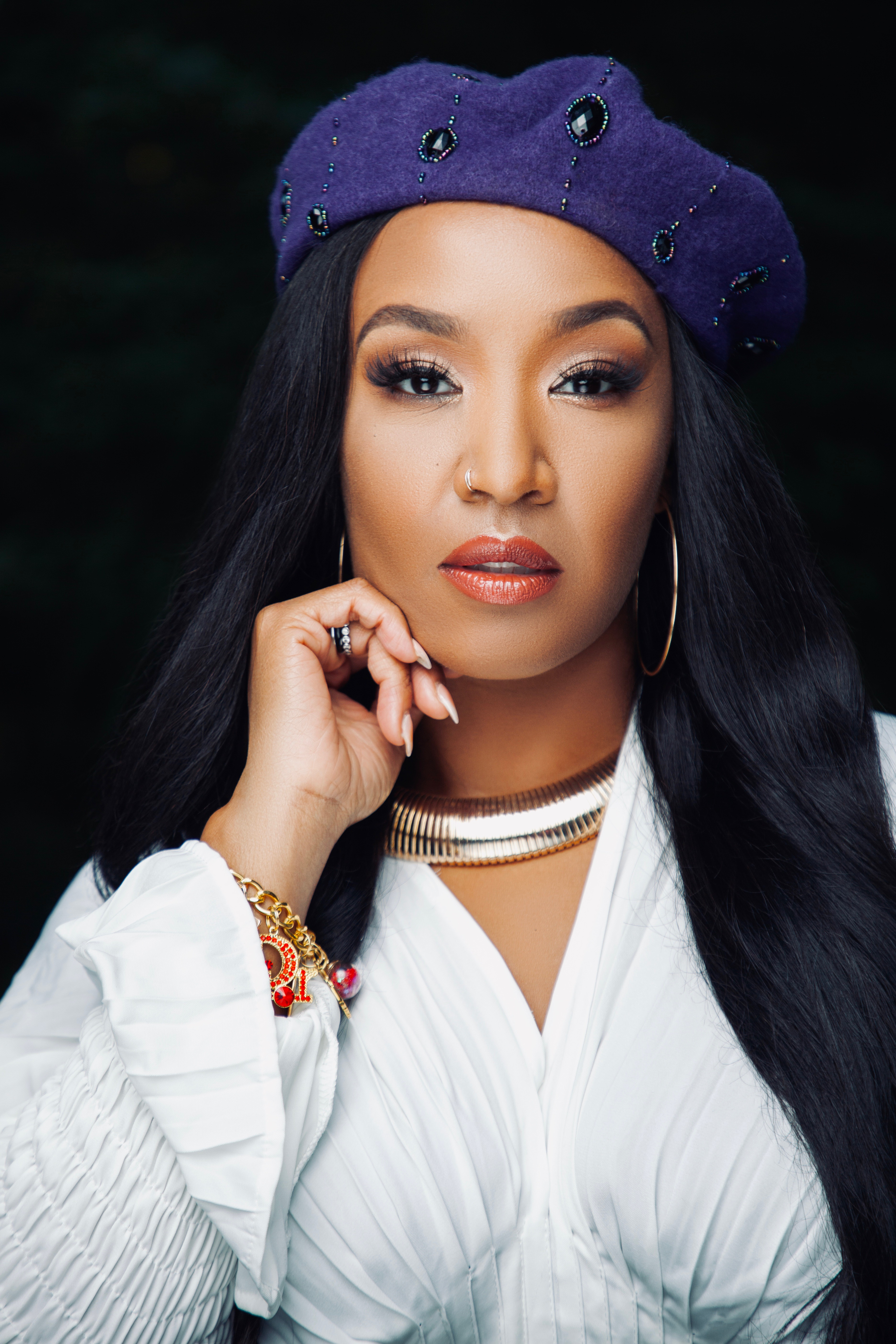

Background information
- Birth name: Y'Anna Monique Crawley
- Born: April 11, 1977 (age 47); Maryland
- Origin: Washington, D.C.
- Genres: urban contemporary gospel
- Occupation(s): Singer, songwriter
- Instrument(s): vocals, singer-songwriter
- Years active: 2009–present
- Labels: Independent
- Website: www.iamyannacrawley.com

Y'Anna Monique Crawley (born April 11, 1977) is an American urban contemporary gospel artist and musician. She began her music career in 2009, performing on the Sunday Best on BET. Her first studio album, The Promise, was released in 2012, by Imago Dei Music Group. This album was her breakthrough release upon the Billboard magazine charts.

== Early life ==
Crawley was born Y'Anna Monique Crawley, on April 11, 1977, in Maryland, and she resides in Washington, D.C. She graduated from Eastern High School in NE Washington, D.C., where she sang in the schools choir. Crawley comes from a long line of musicians, and is related to Julius Cheeks. She became pregnant when she was 17, and this caused her to do backup vocal duties for Jennifer Lopez and gospel musician Stephen Hurd.

== Music career ==
Crawley's music career began in 2009, with appearances on the BET network's signing competition, Sunday Best, where she finished as the season 2 champion, and received a recording contract. She released, The Promise, on August 24, 2010, with Imago Dei Music Group. The peaked at number 2 on the Top Gospel Albums and number 42 on the Independent Albums charts. She would win a Stellar Award for Female Artist of the Year, in 2012. She also is a choir member in Coming 2 America.

== Personal life ==
Crawley has two sons, born 13 years apart.

== Discography ==
=== Studio albums ===
List of studio albums, with selected chart positions
Title	Album details	Peak chart positions	
Title	Album details	US Gos	US Ind
The Promise	Released: August 24, 2010; Label: Imago Dei; CD, digital download	2	42

Preceded by Crystal Aikin	Sunday Best winner 2009	Succeeded by Le'Andria Johnson
