= Andrea Helms =

- Birth name: Andrea Lyn Stout
- Born: October 28, 1973 (age 51); Odessa, Texas
- Origin: Denton, Texas
- Genres: Gospel, CCM, worship
- Occupation(s): Singer, songwriter
- Instrument(s): vocals, singer-songwriter
- Years active: 2011–present
- Labels: Dream, Music World

Andrea Lyn Helms (née, Stout; born October 28, 1973) is an American gospel music recording artist and musician. She started her music career, in 2011, by performing on Sunday Best on BET. Her release, an extended play, Moving Forward, was released in 2012, by Music World Entertainment. This EP was her breakthrough release upon the Billboard magazine charts. She released, Clap Your Hands, in 2014, with Dream Records.

== Early life and background ==
Helms was born, Andrea Lyn Stout, on October 28, 1973, in Odessa, Texas, the daughter of Reverend Johnny Ray Stout and Jacqueline Peter, where her father was the pastor at Friendship Church, while he died on November 1, 2009. In 1993, she married her husband, Michael Helms; they were born exactly two years apart, and together they have a son, Jalyn. She and her husband are the pastors of Friendship Church in Denton, Texas.

== Music career ==
Her music career started in 2011, with the appearance on BET's reality television signing competition, Sunday Best, where she finished was a finalist of season 4, and this got her a recording contract. She released, an extended play, Moving Forward, on March 6, 2012, with Music World. This EP was her breakthrough album upon the Billboard magazine charts, where it placed on The Billboard 200, Top Gospel Albums and Independent Albums charts, peaking at Nos. 77, 2, and 11, correspondingly. Her subsequent release, a studio album, Clap Your Hands, was released on October 28, 2014, from Dream Records. The album peaked at No. 6 on the Top Gospel Albums chart.

== Discography ==
Studio albums

List of studio albums, with selected chart positions
Title	Album details	Peak chart positions
Title	Album details	US Gos
Clap Your Hands	Released: October 28, 2014; Label: Dream; CD, digital download	6

EPs

List of EPs, with selected chart positions
Title	Album details	Peak chart positions		
Title	Album details	US	US Gos	US Ind
Moving Forward	Released: March 6, 2012; Label: Music World; CD, digital download	77	2	11
