= Witness (gospel group) =

American contemporary gospel group

- Origin: Detroit, Michigan
- Genres: Urban contemporary gospel, traditional black gospel
- Years active: 1986–2006
- Labels: PolyGram, A&M, Tyscot, Compendia, CGI, Intersound, Axiom
- Past members: Lisa Page Brooks; Marvie Wright (1986-1987); Tina Brooks (1986-1991); Yolanda Harris (1986-1991); Diane Campbell (1986-1996); Lizz Lee (1991-1992); Lou Ann Stewart (1991-1996; 2003-2006); Laeh Jones (1992-2006); Candace Smith (1997-1999); Ayana Thomas (1997-1999); Tasha Page-Lockhart (2003-2004)

Witness was a contemporary gospel group from Detroit, Michigan. Often called the female version of Commissioned, an all-male contemporary gospel group, they were the brainchild of and chiefly produced by Michael A. Brooks, an original member and producer of Commissioned.

== History ==
The group hailed from Detroit, Michigan, and was originally formed as a quintet consisting of Lisa Page Brooks, Tina Brooks, Yolanda Harris, Diane Campbell, and Marvie Wright. The group was signed to the Tyscot label in 1986 where they produced their debut album Keep Looking Up, after which Wright departed the group. After the release of their fourth album Mean What You Say, Tina Brooks and Yolanda Harris also left.

In the years between Mean What You Say and the release of Standard, LouAnn Stewart joined the group; gospel singer Lizz Lee also briefly joined before being replaced by Lisa's sister Laeh Page. After the release of A Song In the Night, Campbell and Stewart left the group. Detroit singers Ayana Thomas and Candice Smith joined the group for Love Is An Action Word, but subsequently left when it went on hiatus in 1999. When Witness returned in 2003 for An Appointed Time, LouAnn Stewart rejoined the group. Tasha Page-Lockhart, daughter of Lisa Page Brooks and future Sunday Best winner, had also joined the group.

Albums We Can Make a Difference and Standard received three-star reviews from AllMusic, and albums Mean What You Say and Love Is an Action Word received four-star reviews from the publication. Witness's best-reviewed album was He Can Do the Impossible, which was awarded four and a half stars.

Cross Rhythms rated Mean What You Say a four out of ten, while giving A Song in the Night a nine out of ten. An Appointed Time was awarded a seven out of ten, and Speak to the Generations was rated an eight out of ten.

Witness also experienced Billboard success with their albums He Can Do the Impossible, We Can Make a Difference, Love Is an Action Word, A Song in the Night, and Standard.

== Accolades ==
Witness was nominated for a Grammy in 1991 for Best Group/Duo, and was awarded the 1991 GMWA Excellence Award for Best Group and the 1993 Stellar Award for Best Performance Group/Duo.

== Discography ==
=== Albums ===
Release date	Album title	Label
1987	Keep Looking Up	Tyscot Records
1989	I've Come Too Far	Tyscot Records
1990	We Can Make a Difference	Fix It/Polygram Records
1991	Mean What You Say	Fix It/Polygram Records
June 22, 1993	Standard	CGI Records
September 13, 1994	He Can Do the Impossible	CGI Records
April 16, 1996	A Song in the Night	CGI Records
June 2, 1998	Love Is an Action Word	CGI Records
November 25, 2003	An Appointed Time	Axiom Records
July 19, 2005	Speak to the Generations	Axiom Records

=== Compilations ===
Release date	Album title	Label
1999	The Best of Witness	CGI Records
