= Alexis Spight =

- Born: July 3, 1993 (age 33); Buffalo, New York
- Origin: Buffalo, New York
- Genres: CCM, urban contemporary gospel
- Occupations: Singer, songwriter
- Instruments: Vocals, singer-songwriter
- Years active: 2012–present
- Label: Independent

Alexis Spight (born July 3, 1993) is an American urban contemporary gospel musician, and runner-up on season five of the BET singing competition, Sunday Best. She started her music career, in 2012, with the single, "Imagine Me", and the song placed on the Hot Gospel Songs chart. Her first album, L.O.L. (Living Out Loud), was released in 2013 by Music World Gospel. This album was her Billboard magazine breakthrough release upon The Billboard 200, Gospel Albums, and Independent Albums charts.

== Early life ==
Spight was born on July 3, 1993, in Buffalo, New York, a daughter of Michelle (née Morse) and Pastor Lee Allen Spight Jr., she has five sisters and one brother.

== Music career ==
Spight made the finals on season five of the BET singing competition, Sunday Best, which she finished runner-up to Joshua Rogers. Her music recording career commenced in 2012, with the single, "Imagine Me", and it was released in 2012 by Music World Gospel. This placed on the Hot Gospel Songs chart at No. 25. It would later peak at No. 22 in 2013, and the single, "Steady", beat that with a peak position of No. 21, during the same year. Also, these songs released on her debut studio album, L.O.L. (Living Out Loud), that released on March 12, 2013, by Music World Gospel. The album was her breakthrough release upon the Billboard magazine charts of The Billboard 200 at No. 83, Gospel Albums at No. 1, and Independent Albums at No. 17.

== Discography ==
=== Studio albums ===
List of studio albums, with selected chart positions
Title	Album details	Peak chart positions		
Title	Album details	US	US Gos	US Ind
‘’L.O.L. (Living Out Loud)’’	Released: March 12, 2013; Label: Music World Gospel; CD, digital download	83	1	17
Dear Diary	Released: August 28, 2015; Label: Entertainment One Music; CD, Digital Download		2	14
