= We Can Make a Difference =

We Can Make A Difference

Studio album by Witness
- Released: January 5, 1990
- Recorded: 1989–1990
- Genre: Gospel music
- Label: PolyGram
- Producer: Michael Brooks

Witness chronology
I've Come Too Far (1988)	We Can Make A Difference (1990)	Mean What You Say (1991)

Professional ratings
Review scores
Source	Rating
AllMusic	3/5 stars

We Can Make a Difference is the third studio album by Witness.

== Track listing ==
No.	Title	Length
1.	"Old Landmark"	4:04
2.	"Learning to Love You"	4:12
3.	"Telling You Once Again"	4:08
4.	"Why Not"	4:09
5.	"Go Right Ahead"	3:59
6.	"You Haven't Lived"	3:42
7.	"We Can Make a Difference"	4:29
8.	"He'll Be There"	4:36
9.	"All God's Promises"	3:49
10.	"Without You in My Life"	4:02

== Charts ==
Chart (1990)	Peak position
US Top Gospel Albums (Billboard)	30
