= Keep Holding On (disambiguation) =

"Keep Holding On" is a 2006 song by Avril Lavigne.

Keep Holding On or Just Keep Holding On may also refer to:

== Music ==
- "Keep Holding On", song by Ace Spectrum Mel Kent, Ken Williams 1975
- "Keep Holding On", song by The Gap Band Lonnie Simmons, Charlie Wilsson, Rudy Taylor, Oliver Scott, Jimmy Hamilton 1986
- "Keep Holding On", song by The Temptations E. Holland, B. Holland 1976

== See also ==
- I’ll Keep Holding On (disambiguation)
- "Just Keep Holding On", song by Sam and Dave 1968
