= Warner Bros. Theatre Ventures =

Theatre arm of Skydance

- Logo used since 2023
- Type: Subsidiary
- Industry: Theater
- Founded: May 2003; 23 years ago
- Headquarters: US
- Key people: Mark Kaufman (EVP)
- Products: Musicals, plays
- Services: Licensing
- Parent: Warner Bros. Entertainment
- Website: warnerbrostheaterventures.com

Warner Bros. Theatre Ventures is the live show, stageplay and musical production arm of Warner Bros.. Warner Bros. Theatre Ventures is led by Mark Kaufman.

Founded in 2003, to develop and produce plays and musicals based on the Warner Bros. library. The first production by Warner Bros. Theatre Ventures was a musical adaptation of Anne Rice's The Vampire Chronicles entitled Lestat which entered development in 2003 and opened in 2006.

== History ==
Warner Bros. Theatre Ventures was formed in May 2003 by Gregg Maday, to focus on making stage adaptations of the Warner Bros. film library. Warner Bros. had considered creating a division to produce live stage shows after witnessing Disney's success with bringing Beauty and the Beast to Broadway. Maday brought in Broadway producer Emanuel Azenberg as a consultant, and the first production they started working on was one about Batman. The music was written by Jim Steinman, with a book by David Ives, originally Tim Burton expressed interest in directing the Broadway show. But after Dance of the Vampires by Steinman and Ives flopped on Broadway, Warner Bros. pulled the plug on the Batman musical.

Warner Bros. received an offer from Linda Woolverton and Robert Jess Roth, the writer and director of the Beauty and the Beast musical. The two of them wanted to work with songwriters Elton John and Bernie Taupin on a new musical based on Anne Rice's The Vampire Chronicles. "When you are starting something, and you get offered the two people who had worked on Beauty and the Beast, Elton John and Bernie Taupin on their first Broadway partnership, and Anne Rice, who has extraordinary success as a novelist, as package, it was really difficult to say 'no' to that, even if I wanted to," Maday explained.

Production on Lestat started in November of 2003. Lestat premiered at the Curran Theatre, San Francisco, California on December 17, 2005 and closed on January 29, 2006. The musical opened on Broadway at the Palace Theatre on March 25, 2006 and closed on May 28, 2006, after 33 previews and 39 performances.

The next venture into Broadway was not until 2009, with Elf. After a 2009 workshop, the musical officially opened for a limited holiday engagement at the Al Hirschfeld Theatre on Broadway on November 14, 2010, following previews from November 2, 2010. Maday went on to leave Warner Bros. Theatre Ventures in 2011, and was replaced by Mark Kaufman.

== Book adaptations ==
=== Lestat ===
The show began previews in New York City on March 25, 2006 and officially opened at the Palace Theatre on April 25, 2006. The musical was the first Broadway adaptation by Warner Bros., based on The Vampire Chronicles by Anne Rice and featured a book by Linda Woolverton, music by Elton John, and lyrics by Bernie Taupin. The musical closed on May 28, 2006 after 33 previews and 39 performances, and overall bad reviews.

=== The Bridges of Madison County ===
The musical began Broadway previews on January 17, 2014 at the Gerald Schoenfeld Theatre and opened on February 20, 2014. Although critically the musical was received fairly well, it failed to sell enough tickets to stay open and the musical closed on May 18, 2014, after 137 performances. Despite closing early, the musical went on to win the 2014 Tony Awards for "Best Original Score" and "Best Orchestrations" on June 8, 2014.

A US national tour began November 2015 and ran until July 2016.

=== The Curious Incident of the Dog in the Night-Time ===
Adapted by Simon Stephens and directed by Marianne Elliott, the show premièred at the Royal National Theatre's Cottesloe Theatre on 2 August 2012. The show went on to win eight Laurence Olivier Awards in 2013, including Best New Play, Best Actor, and Best Director. Following the success in London, it play went on a UK tour in December 2014. The play transferred to Broadway making its American debut at the Ethel Barrymore Theatre, starting previews on October 5, 2014, with the official opening September 10, 2014. The show was a massive critical success, going on to win six Tony Awards, six Drama Desk Awards, and six Outer Critics Circle Awards. The show ended its Broadway run on September 4, 2016, after 800 performances. A US national tour began September 27, 2016, followed by an international tour and another UK tour in 2017, and an Australian tour in 2018.

=== Doctor Zhivago ===
Doctor Zhivago had its world premiere as Zhivago at the La Jolla Playhouse in San Diego, California in 2006. An Australian touring production of the musical directed by Des McAnuff premiered as Doctor Zhivago – A New Musical at the Lyric Theatre, Sydney. The show received glowing reviews. The production ran from February 19 through April 3, 2011,

A Seoul original production directed by Des McAnuff, premiered at the Charlotte Theatre, Seoul, January 25, 2012, following previews the show opened officially January 27, and ran until June 3, 2012.

In 2014, McAnuff directed a Swedish translation of the play for the Scandinavian premier, at Malmö Opera.

A 2015 Broadway production, again directed by Des McAnuff, It began previews at the Broadway Theatre on March 27, 2015, opened on April 21, 2015, and closed on May 10, 2015, due to low ticket sales and a lack of Tony Award nominations. It had played a total of 26 previews and 23 performances.

=== Misery ===
Written by William Goldman, the writer of the 1990 film, Misery was produced in association with Castle Rock Entertainment. The show premiered at the Bucks County Playhouse, Pennsylvania for a limited time engagement on November 24, 2012, for 11 performances, and closed December 8, 2012. In March 2015 it was announced that Misery would premiere on Broadway for a limited time engagement starring Bruce Willis as writer Paul Sheldon and Laurie Metcalf as Annie Wilkes at the Broadhurst Theatre beginning previews on October 22, 2015, formally opening on November 15, 2015. The show closed on February 14, 2016. For her performance as Annie, Metcalf was nominated for a Tony Award for Best Actress in a Play.

=== Charlie and the Chocolate Factory ===
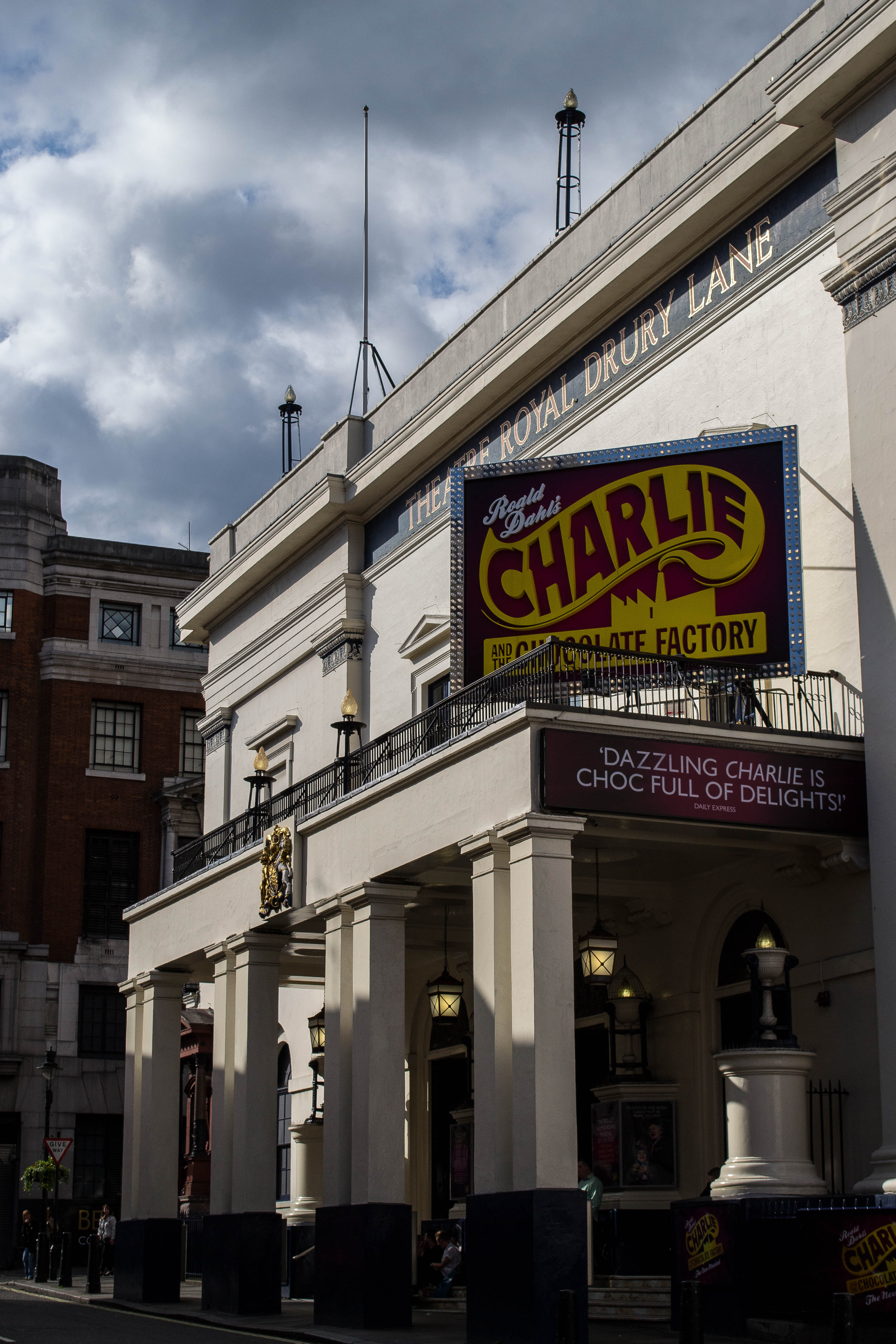
Charlie and the Chocolate Factory bill boards at the Theatre Royal, Drury Lane in 2014.

The musical began previews May 22, 2013, at the Theatre Royal, Drury Lane, London, officially opening June 25, 2013. The show currently holds the record for the highest weekly gross in the West End, with an income of £1,080,260 during the week commencing December 30, 2013.

A reworked version of the show opened on Broadway in early 2017 with changes including new direction by Jack O'Brien, choreography by Josh Bergasse and a new set design by original designer Mark Thompson. O'Brien stated the score would pay homage to the Leslie Bricusse/Anthony Newley songs written for the 1971 film and would also feature the songs written by Shaiman and Wittman. In August 2016, O'Brien confirmed that "The Candy Man" and "Pure Imagination" would be included in the musical. The show opened at the Lunt-Fontanne Theatre starring Christian Borle as Willy Wonka. Emma Pfaeffle as Veruca Salt, and F. Michael Haynie as Augustus Gloop. previews began March 28, 2017, with opening night officially being April 23, 2017. On 15 November 2017, producers announced that production would close on 14 January 2018 after 27 previews and 305 performances.

A US National Tour began September 2018, starting in Buffalo, New York. An Australian production premiered at the Capitol Theatre on January 5, 2019, and opened on the 11th.

=== The Outsiders ===
Based on the novel by S. E. Hinton and on its 1983 film adaptation, the show held its world premiere at La Jolla Playhouse in February/March 2023. It began Broadway previews on March 16, 2024 at the Bernard B. Jacobs Theatre with an opening night that took place on April 11, 2024. The production is directed by Danya Taymor from a libretto by Adam Rapp, with songs by Jamestown Revival and music supervision, arrangements, and orchestrations by Justin Levine. It received 12 nominations at the 77th Tony Awards and won four awards, including Best Musical.

== Live-action adaptations ==
=== Elf ===
The show debuted for a limited time holiday engagement on November 2, 2010, in New York City at the Al Hirschfeld Theatre in previews, with the official opening being November 14, 2010. A Broadway cast recording was released to November 1, 2011. The popularity of the show spawned repeated national tours in 2012, 2013, 2014, and 2016. The show was revived for Broadway November 9, 2012 for another limited time holiday engagement before closing January 6, 2013. In 2014 NBC premiered a stop-motion animation adaptation of Elf: The Musical starring Jim Parsons

Elf made its international debut in London for another limited time holiday engagement at the Dominion Theatre October 24, 2015. The show officially became the fastest selling show since the Dominion Theatre opened in 1929.

=== A Christmas Story: The Musical ===
Premiering at the Kansas City Repertory Theatre, Missouri for a limited holiday engagement in December 2009. The musical began previews for another limited holiday engagement on Broadway at the Lunt-Fontanne Theatre on November 7, 2012, with the official opening on November 19, 2012. The musical features original songs from Pasek and Paul and is an adaptation of the 1983 film of the same name. Due to the show's popularity, it spawned national tours annually and received its international debut in London at the Waterloo Easter Theatre on November 28, 2018.

In 2017, FOX broadcast a live Television special of the musical entitled A Christmas Story Live!.

=== Beetlejuice ===
The musical opened October 14, 2018 at the National Theatre in Washington, D.C., after a successful limited-time run the show closed on November 18, 2018. On September 6, 2018, it was announced following its Washington, D.C., performance the show would transfer to Broadway, opening for the 2018-2019 musical season at the Winter Garden Theatre with previews beginning on March 28, 2019, and an official opening night on April 25, 2019. The show was set to close on June 6, 2020, but due to the COVID-19 Pandemic, closed on March 10, 2020. It had reopened at the Marquis Theatre on April 8, 2022, and then closed on January 8, 2023.

=== New Jack City: Live ===
Warner Bros Theatre Venture made special arrangements and licensed the rights to playwright and NAACP Award winner Je'Caryous Johnson to produce a live stage adaptation to the 1991 action-crime film New Jack City. The production opened its two-day preview on October 29-30, 2022 at the Gas South Theater in Atlanta, Georgia and is currently running in a national tour from November of 2022 into June of 2024. The stage play stars Allen Payne, who reprises his role as "Gee Money", Treach as Nino Brown, Flex Alexander as "Pookie", Big Daddy Kane as Stone and Gary Dourdan as Scotty. Omar Gooding was cast as Stone for the 2024 production run. The live stage adaptation is the second production Je'Caryous Johnson produced under the Warner Bros. Theater Venture. He previously produced Set It Off: Live in 2018 and 2020.

=== Upcoming productions ===
==== Dave ====
The show was first announced by Variety in November 2014 after an industry reading held on October 31. In summer 2016 it was announced a second private reading was held featuring Broadway star Brian d’Arcy James The musical debuted at Arena Stage in Washington, D.C., on July 18, 2018, for a limited engagement until August 19, 2018. There has yet to be any word on whether the show will move to Broadway.

==== Crazy Rich Asians ====
First announced in April of 2024 by Warner Bros., the play is set to be directed by the film's director Jon M. Chu, with a book by Leah Nanako Winkler, music by Helen Park, and lyrics by Amanda Green. The show had a public workshop in December of 2025; no official opening date has been made public.

== Other adaptations ==
=== Baby It's You! ===
The show is a jukebox musical that premiered at the Coast Playhouse in Los Angeles on July 18, 2009, that ran until August 30, 2009. The show went on to open with the same cast at the Pasadena Playhouse on November 13, 2009, and ran until December 13, 2009.

The show opened on Broadway at the Broadhurst Theatre, starting previews on March 26, 2011, officially opening on April 27, 2011. The production closed on September 4, 2011, after horrible reviews, even going so far to be called "dismal" by The New York Times.

== Non-stage productions ==
=== Others ===
- Elf: Buddy's Musical Christmas – A stop-motion animation production of the 2009 musical
- A Christmas Story Live! – A 2017 Television adaptation of the 2012 musical

== See also ==
- Harry Potter and the Cursed Child - Despite Warner Bros. owning the Harry Potter brand, they were not involved with the creation of the play.
