= Sunday Best season 5 =

Sunday Best
- Season 5
- Starring: Kirk Franklin; Donnie McClurkin; CeCe Winans; Yolanda Adams; Kim Burrell
- No. of episodes: 12

Release
- Original network: BET

Season chronology
- ← Previous; Season 4

Sunday Best is a gospel-singing reality television competition on BET.

The fifth season of Sunday Best saw the removal of Erica and Tina Campbell as a judge and the Returning of Yolanda Adams as a judge and the Debut of CeCe Winans . Season 5 of Sunday Best began auditioning/taping in March 2012. The season began airing in July 2012 and concluded in September 2012.

Season 5's winner was Joshua Rogers who was crowned the winner during the two-hour season finale, and the runner-up was Alexis Spight. The two-hour finale show featured performances from gospel music artists. Rogers, who was the first man and youngest person ever to win Sunday Best, was awarded a new Ford Explorer, a recording contract, and the "Sunday Best" title.
