= He Can Do the Impossible =

Studio album by Witness
- Released: September 13, 1994
- Recorded: 1993–1994
- Genre: Gospel music
- Label: CGI Records
- Producer: Michael Brooks

Witness chronology
Standard (1993)	He Can Do the Impossible (1994)	A Song in the Night (1996)

Professional ratings
Review scores
Source	Rating
AllMusic	4.5/5 stars

He Can Do the Impossible, released in 1994 on CGI Records, is a gospel music album by American contemporary gospel music group Witness. The album reached No. 12 on the Billboard Gospel Albums chart.

== Track listing ==
1. "He Can Do the Impossible"
2. "We Give Thanks"
3. "Just as You Are"
4. "More Than the World Against You"
5. "Where Would I Be"
6. "When I Pray"
7. "You'll Never Walk Alone"
8. "It's Your Time"
9. "After the Storm Is Gone"
10. "It's Raining in My Life Again"

== Personnel ==
- Lisa Page Brooks: Vocals
- Laeh Page: Vocals
- Diane Campbell: Vocals
- Lou Ann Stewart: Vocals

== Charts ==
Chart (1994)	Peak position
US Top Gospel Albums (Billboard)	12
