= A Song in the Night (album) =

Studio album by Witness
- Released: April 16, 1996
- Genre: Gospel music
- Label: CGI Records

Witness chronology
He Can Do the Impossible (1994)	A Song in the Night (1996)	Love Is an Action Word (1998)

A Song in the Night, released in 1996 on CGI Records, is a gospel music album by American urban contemporary gospel group Witness. This was the group's last album to feature founding member Diane Campbell and features vocals by singer Marshetta Nichols in addition to the four group members. The album hit number three on the Billboard Gospel Albums chart.

== Track listing ==
1. "The Blood"
2. "A Song in the Night"
3. "Prelude"
4. "Give It to Him"
5. "Oh What Love"
6. "Never Change"
7. "More Than a Conqueror"
8. "Jesus Will Answer Your Prayer"
9. "That's What You Mean to Me"
10. "Take the Time to Wait"
11. "Ask of Me"

== Personnel ==
- Lisa Page Brooks: Vocals
- Laeh Page: Vocals
- Diane Campbell: Vocals
- Lou Ann Stewart: Vocals
- Marshetta Nichols: Vocals

== Charts ==
Chart (1996)	Peak position
US Christian Albums (Billboard)	25
US Top Gospel Albums (Billboard)	3
