= Love Is an Action Word =

Studio album by Witness
- Released: June 2, 1998
- Genre: Gospel music
- Label: CGI Records

Witness chronology
A Song in the Night (1995)	Love Is an Action Word (1998)	Best of Witness (1999)

Professional ratings
Review scores
Source	Rating
AllMusic	4/5 stars

Love Is an Action Word, released in 1998 on CGI Records, is a gospel music album by American urban contemporary gospel group Witness. This would be the only album to feature then new members Candace Smith and Ayana Thomas and would be the group's last release before disbanding in 1999. The band would later regroup in 2003.

== Track listing ==
1. "Never Let Go"
2. "Justified by Faith"
3. "I'll Reign"
4. "He's Standing By"
5. "Resting in Him"
6. "ABBA Father"
7. "Sing a Song"
8. "Walking in the Light"
9. "An Audience with the King"
10. "Love Is an Action Word"

== Personnel ==
- Lisa Page Brooks: Vocals
- Laeh Page: Vocals
- Candace Smith: Vocals
- Ayana Thomas: Vocals

== Charts ==
Chart (1998)	Peak position
US Top Gospel Albums (Billboard)	16
