= Eric Jerome Dickey =

American author (1961–2021)

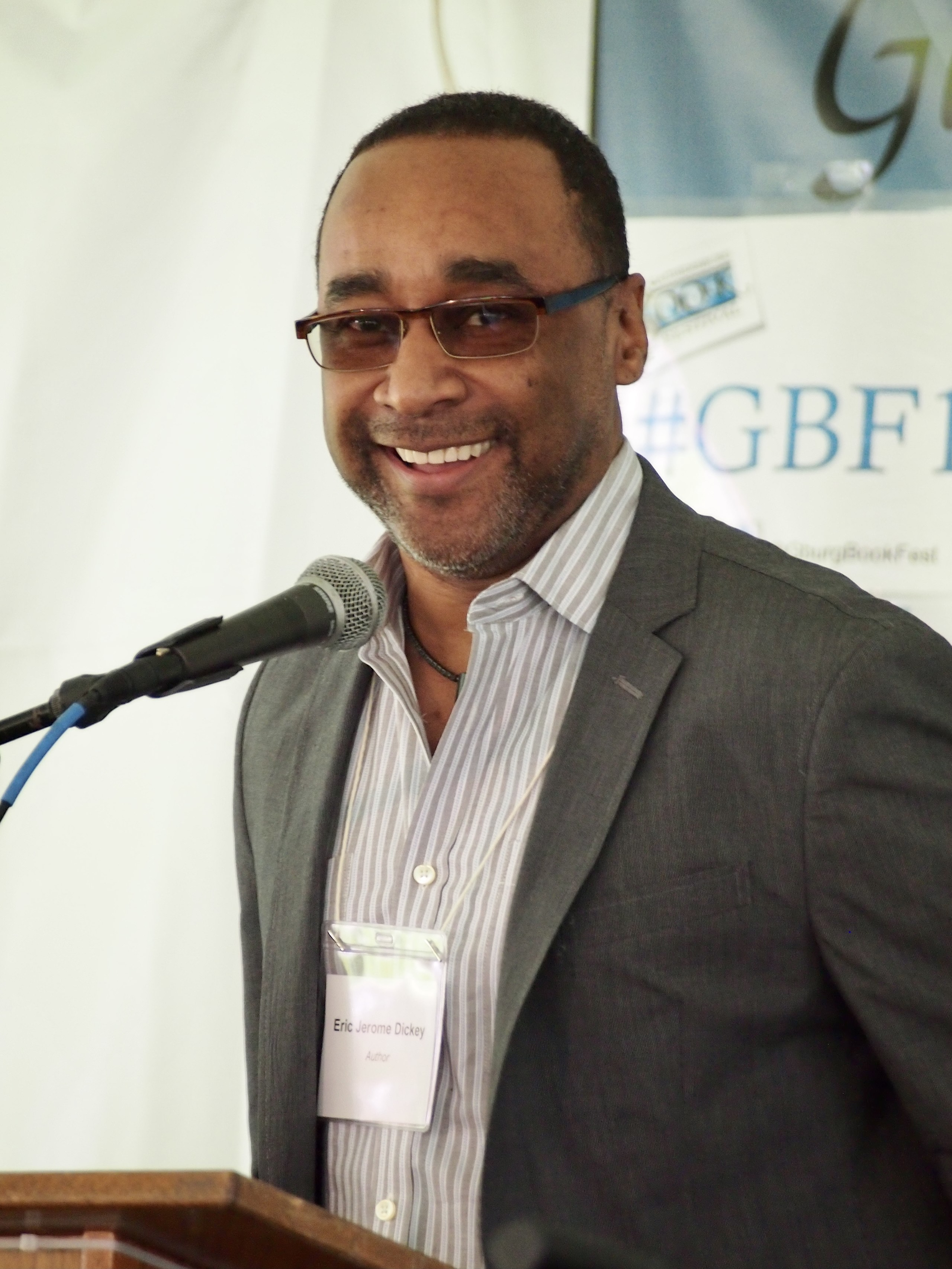
- Dickey at the 2014 Gaithersburg Book Festival
- Born: July 7, 1961; Memphis, Tennessee, U.S.
- Died: January 3, 2021 (aged 59); Los Angeles, California, U.S.
- Education: Memphis State University (BS)
- Occupation: Author
- Website: www.ericjeromedickey.com

Eric Jerome Dickey (July 7, 1961 – January 3, 2021) was an American author. He wrote several crime novels involving grifters, ex-cons, and assassins, the latter novels having more diverse settings, moving from Los Angeles to the United Kingdom to the West Indies, each having an international cast of characters. Dickey was a New York Times bestselling novelist.

== Early life and education ==
Dickey was born in Memphis, Tennessee, on July 7, 1961. He received a Bachelor of Science from Memphis State University in 1983. He was a member of Alpha Phi Alpha fraternity.

In 1983, Dickey moved to Los Angeles to pursue a career in engineering. He was employed in the aerospace industry working at Rockwell International, ASSD division, as a software developer, before deciding that he wanted to pursue acting and stand-up comedy, and began on the local and national comedy circuit.

== Literary career ==
Dickey authored fifteen novels. His work appeared in a variety of publications, including Essence magazine, USA Today, and the Los Angeles Times. His novels were on the bestseller lists of the "Blackboard", The Wall Street Journal, and The New York Times. Dickey appeared as a guest on many television shows, including BET's Our Voices and CNN's Sunday Morning Live.

Dickey is the author of the graphic novel Storm, which re-imagines the first meeting between the popular X-Men character Ororo Munroe and T'Challa, king of the fictional country of Wakanda and known as the Black Panther.

He performed stand-up comedy, mostly in Southern California. He opened for Bobby "Blue" Bland at the Rialto in Tacoma, Washington.

His books have been published in French, Polish, and Japanese, and several of his books have had separate printings in Great Britain. He toured in England, France (where Milk in My Coffee was a French bestseller), and the Caribbean.

Two of his novels, Friends and Lovers and Cheaters, were turned into touring plays.

Sister, Sister, Friends and Lovers, Milk in My Coffee, Cheaters, and Liar's Game each reached #1 on the "Blackboard Bestsellers List". Cheaters was named "Blackboard Book of the Year" in 2000. Liar's Game, Thieves' Paradise, The Other Woman, and Genevieve were nominated for an NAACP Image Award in the category of Outstanding Literary Work in 2001, 2002, 2004, and 2005. In 2013, he received the R.E.A.D. Award on behalf of the National Advancement of Colored People (NAACP).

A 2004 review of Drive Me Crazy in The New York Times by Janet Maslin stated, "Mr. Dickey's characters have enough sultry self-confidence to suggest, at their best, a Prince song on paper."

His final novel, The Son of Mr. Suleman, was released posthumously in April 2021.

== Death ==
On January 3, 2021, Dickey died of cancer in Los Angeles, California, at the age of 59. His death was confirmed in an official statement from his publisher, Dutton. A New York Times obituary described Dickey as "one of the most successful Black authors of the last quarter-century".

== Bibliography ==
=== Gideon Series ===
1. Sleeping with Strangers (2007) ISBN 978-0451222336
2. Waking with Enemies (2007) ISBN 978-0451222749
3. Dying for Revenge (November 2008) ISBN 978-0451227539
4. Resurrecting Midnight (August 2009) ISBN 978-0451229939
5. Finding Gideon (April 2017) ISBN 978-1101985519

=== Other works ===
- Sister, Sister (1996) ISBN 978-0451188021
- Friends & Lovers (1997), ISBN 978-0451188038 later adapted as a stage play of the same name by Je'Caryous Johnson in 2004.
- Milk in My Coffee (1998) ISBN 978-0-525-94385-3
- Cappuccino (film screenplay) (1998)
- Cheaters (1999) ISBN 978-0-525-94386-0
- Liar's Game (2000) ISBN 978-0-525-94483-6
- Got to Be Real (2000) - contributing writer
- Mothers & Sons (2000) - contributing writer
- Between Lovers (2001) ISBN 978-0-525-94603-8
- Griots Beneath the Baobab: Tales from Los Angeles (2002) - contributing writer
- Black Silk (2002) - contributing writer
- Thieves' Paradise (2002) ISBN 978-0-525-94663-2
- Gumbo: A Celebration of African American Writing (2002) - contributing writer
- The Other Woman (2003) ISBN 978-0-525-94724-0
- Naughty or Nice (2003) ISBN 978-0-525-94776-9
- Drive Me Crazy (2004) ISBN 978-0-525-94790-5
- Genevieve (2005) ISBN 978-0-525-94878-0
- Voices from the Other Side: Dark Dreams II (2006) - contributing writer
- Chasing Destiny (2006) ISBN 978-0-525-94950-3
- Pleasure (2008) ISBN 978-0-525-95045-5
- Tempted by Trouble (August 2010) ISBN 978-0525950585
- An Accidental Affair (April 2012) ISBN 978-0-525-95234-3
- The Education of Nia Simone Bijou (February 2013)
- Decadence (April 2013) ISBN 978-0525953838
- A Wanted Woman (April 2014) ISBN 978-0-525-95427-9
- One Night (April 2015) ISBN 978-0-525-95485-9
- Naughtier than Nice (October 2015) ISBN 978-0-525-95520-7
- The Blackbirds (April 2016) ISBN 9781101984123
- Bad Men and Wicked Women (April 2018) ISBN 978-1-5247-4219-5
- Before We Were Wicked (April 2019) ISBN 978-1-5247-4403-8
- The Business of Lovers (April 2020) ISBN 978-1-5247-4520-2
- The Son of Mr. Suleman (April 2021) ISBN 978-1524745233

== Awards ==
In the 2007 Glyph Comics Awards, the Fan Award for Best Comic was won by Storm.
