= Le'Andria Johnson =

American gospel singer

- Born: Le'Andria Delores Johnson; January 23, 1983 (age 43); Palatka, Florida, U.S.
- Genres: Gospel, contemporary Christian
- Occupations: Singer, songwriter
- Years active: 2010–present
- Labels: Music World, RCA Inspiration
- Website: leandriajohnson.com

Le'Andria Delores Johnson (born January 23, 1983) is an American gospel singer. She was the season three winner of the BET gospel singing competition show Sunday Best.

Johnson's Sunday Best coronation song, "I Shall Leap into My Destiny", co-written by Johnson, entered the Billboard Gospel chart at number 1. Johnson's post-Sunday Best recording The Awakening of Le'Andria Johnson was released in August 2011, Music World Entertainment Gospel and Music World Music. The album debuted at number 1 on the U.S. Billboard Gospel Albums, number 3 on the U.S. Billboard Independent Albums, and number 24 on the Billboard 200. Johnsons' second major-label album The Awakening of Le'Andria Johnson, which included seven new songs, was released in February 2012. Johnson is the first Sunday Best contestant to receive a Grammy Award, which she won in 2012 for Best Gospel/Contemporary Christian Music Performance.

== Early life ==
Johnson was born in Palatka, Florida, to Bishop Gregory Johnson and First Lady and Pastor Sharon Johnson.

Johnson, who was born into a musical family, began singing at age two in her father's church, HQ Ministries in Altamonte Springs, Florida. She went on to become the praise and worship leader within the church.

Before auditioning for the show, Johnson was a performer, producer, and singer-songwriter. Johnson, who had three children at the time, was motivated to audition for the show by her children to give them a better life. Johnson had gone through her second divorce and was having a tough time staying financially sound. The day before she left Orlando to try out in New Orleans she lost her house to foreclosure. Her friends and family helped her get to the audition, and Johnson carried what she could and auditioned in flip flops, socks, and the clothes she had on her back. Johnson was almost eliminated because her appearance was not up to par, a sentiment expressed by two of the judges Mary Mary, especially Tina Campbell. However, after performing "This is the day The Lord Hath made," she was unanimously voted through, and was given a standing ovation by Campbell. Le'Andria Johnson has two godchildren James La 'France Gibson, and Quateem Bolden.

== Sunday Best ==
Johnson had many good performances on the show, though at times the judges and mentor Kim Burrell sensed a hesitation in her, as if there was something on her mind, that she just couldn't quite shake off. On the eighth episode, in a conversation that made the air, Johnson told Burrell that at one point she chose death over life in a "mentor".

In a private conversation while being mentored, Johnson told mentor Kim Burrell that there was a time that she thought she could not go on in this life, but in that moment God kept her "in the midst of it all," which was the primary reason she chose to sing the song on episode four of the season.

During the final performance show, Le'Andria faced off against Elder Goldwire McLendon for the title of Sunday Best. Johnson performed "I Love the Lord", "He Was There", and "In the Midst of It All".

On June 20, 2010, Le'Andria Johnson was crowned the winner of and claimed the title of Sunday Best. As part of her win, she won a national recording contract, a 2010 Ford Taurus SHO, and a cash prize courtesy of Degree Nature Effects.

Johnson and Elder Goldwire McLendon had taped the finale a month before with two different endings, they both appeared on 106 & Park as finalists, and she found out that she had won, while back home in Orlando, watching with her family. Johnson was reported to have said, "I was like, 'For real?'. It was crazy, it was bananas, like fireworks. I've never seen my family so happy."

== Post-Sunday Best ==
After winning Sunday Best, Johnson's label, hoping to capitalize on her new-found audience, released an EP of seven songs on September 6, 2011 entitled The Awakening of Le'Andria Johnson, which spawned the hit, "Jesus", the performance of which would go on to give Johnson her first Grammy nomination and subsequent win. She also co-wrote the Grammy-winning song.

With the success of her first EP, Johnson became the first Sunday Best winner to release two more projects. She released a self-titled, Christmas EP on November 21, 2011, and another project known as: The Evolution of Le’Andria Johnson, on February 14, 2012.

In addition to her second EP, a 14-song album was released also on February 14, 2012 entitled: The Evolution of Le’Andria Johnson Deluxe Edition.

== Philanthropy ==
Johnson, herself homeless at the time of her audition, did a benefit concert called "Up From the Ashes" at South Church in Lansing Michigan. The original concert date was April 1, 2011, but the concert was ultimately postponed when Johnson found out her brother had been shot and killed in Orlando Florida. She learned of the news moments before leaving for Michigan. The concert was held on May 6, 2011. Johnson's various life challenges have not deterred her ministry and anointed singing in the Christian community.

Johnson recently started IPC (Imperfect People Changing) Ministries in Atlanta, Georgia. Their first service was held on June 16, 2013. On New Year's Eve 2014, Johnson and IPC Ministries held an outdoor concert bringing food, clothing, praise and worship to the streets of Atlanta. The concert was a huge success, which motivated Johnson to establish iProgress, an outreach initiative which gives back to those less fortunate in the city of Atlanta. iProgress distributes, food, clothing, bibles, and in-kind gifts once a month, outside the homeless shelter at Peachtree and Pine Street.

== Controversy ==
Johnson expressed in an in-depth interview with the Associated Press that for quite some time after her Sunday Best win she partied, drank, and "lived it up" while singing the Gospel and pastoring. This was an issue because many in the Christian community felt that her conduct revealed troubling character and spiritual issues.

Rumors started to circulate about Johnson as she performed on Celebration of Gospel with a noticeable bulge in her midsection. Johnson received negative attention after she confirmed that she was pregnant with her fourth child, unlike the previous three children, this one was out of wedlock. Johnson continued to perform and minister through the pregnancy.

In September 2015, Johnson broadcast for 10 minutes on Periscope while drinking Patron, a brand of tequila. During the broadcast, she used profanity, criticized the church, including Christians who were being hypocritical. ’"

Johnson's Periscope appearance stirred controversy and outrage by some in the Christian community. A few days after her broadcast, she appeared on Praise 102.5 FM (Joy105.com) to defend her actions. Johnson said she broadcast on Periscope to "keep it real" and "invite people into her life."

== Preachers of Atlanta ==
In 2015, Johnson began filming with Preachers of Atlanta, a reality show spin-off of the Oxygen hit Preachers of L.A. that chronicles the lives 5 Atlanta-based preachers live within ministry. Despite the show's focus on liberal theologies – all of the preachers have, at some point on the show, expressed disdain for the impractical and oppressive regimes of contemporary American churches – Johnson has been a standout in her non-traditional techniques of ministering and pastoring. For starters, she is a woman and pastor; women's leadership is still incredibly controversial in the church. Johnson does not believe in the traditional liturgical techniques of the black church or formal attire. She has also been known to pass out cigarettes and condoms to people in the inner city neighborhoods of Atlanta. This move has been quite controversial among her fellow preacher friends on the reality show. According to Le'Andria, "although we do not condone it, some people are going to smoke or have sex anyway, in which case we want them to be safe. Many people will not have a conversation about God, the Bible, or spirituality. When we say we try to "meet them where they are," this is to simply start a conversation, share testimonies, and minister the gospel of Jesus. You find that despite their current situation, many of the people know the Bible and are ready to change their lives; they appreciate not judging them or scolding them, but simply having an open and honest conversation with them. The came to church afterward, and are still coming." Some of Johnson's peers see these actions as abetting sinful behaviors in the name of Jesus.

Le'Andria's infamous Periscope incident was a subject of debate in the last several episodes of season 1 of Preachers of Atlanta. Her colleagues on the show all felt that her conduct was inappropriate and failed to support Le'Andria in the way that she had expected they would. She frequently comments that she feels that they don't understand her. On the finale episode of season 1 of Preachers of Atlanta, Le'Andria comes to a realization, with the help of a ministerial mentor, that her actions have been inappropriate, and promises to recommit herself to a holy and righteous life.

== Personal life ==
Johnson has been divorced at least three times, from Michael Underwood in 2020 and previously from Forrest Walker; a protracted divorce battle was revealed in 2020, wherein the spouse in question was not named. She has also referenced another marriage that began around 2001. She has at least four children.

== Legal issues ==
At 2:42 pm on December 16, 2024, Johnson was arrested outside the Brick Top's restaurant on North Main Street in downtown Greenville, South Carolina after she was found screaming profanities at patrons, including a man who was walking with her. She was then charged with both public intoxication and having an open container on a public street. She was released from the Greenville County Detention Center on the afternoon of December 17, 2024 after she was able to pay a $257.50 bond.

== Discography ==
=== Albums ===
Title	Album details	Peak chart positions			Sales
Title	Album details	US	US Gospel	US Indep.	Sales
The Awakening of Le'Andria Johnson EP	First Extended Play; Release date: September 6, 2011; Label: Music World Gospel	24	1	3	US: 202,803
Christmas Best	First holiday album; Release date: December 22, 2011; Label: Music World Gospel	—	10	—	
The Evolution of Le'Andria Johnson EP	Second Extended Play; Release date: February 14, 2012; Label: Music World Gospel	69	2	8	US: 59,334
The Experience	First studio album; Release date: September 18, 2012; Label: Music World Gospel	85	3	22	US: 38,926
Bigger Than Me	Second studio album; Release date: July 21, 2017; Label: Provident Label Group	—	1	—	

=== Singles ===
Year	Title	US Gospel	Album
2011	Jesus	15	The Awakening of Le'Andria Johnson
2012	It's Gonna Be Alright	25	The Evolution of Le'Andria Johnson

Nominated for NAACP Image award For best gospel album

== Awards ==
Year	Association	Category	Result
2011	Digital Gospel Music Awards	Best Female Gospel Artist	Won
2012	Grammy Awards	Best Gospel/Contemporary Christian Music Performance	Won
2013	Stellar Awards	Best New Artist	Won
2013	Stellar Awards	Best Contemporary Female Vocalist	Won
2016	Steeple Awards	Female Artist Of The Year	Won

Preceded by Y'Anna Crawley	Sunday Best winner 2010	Succeeded by Amber Bullock
