= Mean What You Say (Witness album) =

Studio album by Witness
- Released: 1991
- Genre: Gospel music
- Label: CGI Records
- Producer: Michael Brooks

Witness chronology
We Can Make a Difference (1990)	Mean What You Say (1991)	Standard (1993)

Professional ratings
Review scores
Source	Rating
AllMusic	3/5 stars

Mean What You Say, released in 1991 on CGI Records, is a gospel music album by American contemporary gospel music group Witness. This would be the last album to feature original founding members Tina Brooks and Yolanda Harris, who departed after the album's release. Gospel singer Lizz Lee stepped in with LouAnn Stewart to replace Brooks and Harris to promote the album. Lee would then depart the group and be permanently replaced by Lisa Page's sister Laeh Page.

The album earned a Grammy Award nomination for Best Contemporary Soul Gospel Album.

== Track listing ==
1. "Perfect Peace"
2. "Yesterday Is Gone"
3. "Mean What You Say"
4. "There's Someone"
5. "Yes I Will"
6. "Would Not Change a Thing"
7. "Still in the Middle"
8. "Thoughtful"
9. "Good Love and Peace of Mind"
10. "Lately"
11. "Go Tell It on the Mountain"
12. "Living Beneath Your Privilege"

== Personnel ==
- Lisa Page Brooks: Vocals
- Tina Brooks: Vocals
- Diane Campbell: Vocals
- Yolanda Harris: Vocals
