= Standard (Witness album) =

Studio album by Witness
- Released: May 18, 1993
- Genre: Gospel music
- Label: A&M Records

Witness chronology
Mean What You Say (1991)	Standard (1993)	He Can Do the Impossible (1994)

Professional ratings
Review scores
Source	Rating
AllMusic	3/5 stars

Standard, released in 1993 on A&M Records, is a gospel music album by American urban contemporary gospel group Witness. The album contains the title track, "Standard" and the song "Get in the Way", which won the GMWA Excellence Award for Best Contemporary Song. The group won the Stellar Award for Best Contemporary Group Performance.

== Track listing ==
1. "Standard" - 5:37
2. "Believe" - 4:52
3. "Since He Came" - 4:22
4. "Beginning" - 4:35
5. "Safety" - 6:09
6. "Get in the Way" - 4:29
7. "Don't Take It Away" - 3:58
8. "Magnify" - 4:18
9. "Remember" - 6:07
10. "The Latter" - 4:28

== Personnel ==
- Lisa Page Brooks: Vocals,
- Laeh Page: Vocals
- Diane Campbell: Vocals
- Lou Ann Stewart: Vocals

== Charts ==
Chart (1993)	Peak position
US Top Gospel Albums (Billboard)	11
