= Sunday Best season 1 =

Sunday Best
- Season 1
- Starring: Kirk Franklin (host); BeBe Winans; Erica Campbell; Tina Campbell (judges)
- No. of episodes: 10

Release
- Original network: BET
- Original release: 2007

Season chronology
- Next → Season 2

Sunday Best is a reality television series on Black Entertainment Television.

The first season was filmed in Los Angeles, California, and the winner was Crystal Aikin.

== The Competition ==
During the second and third weeks of the competition, the 20 finalists were divided into two groups of 10. All ten contestants in their respective groups performed one song, and five of the ten were eliminated the night of their performance.

Singing in Week 2
Trevon Davis	Jermaine Sellers	Kenya Glover	Shari Addison	Janice Collins
Melody Betts	Saudia Mills	Daniel Parra	Christal Garrick	Tamara Thomas

Singing in Week 3
Queensley Felix	Corey Webb	Emily Gomez	Crystal Aikin	Tasha Collins
Deanna Dixon	Lawrence Williams	Juanell Johnson	Yvonne Cobbs-Bey	Charisma Sweat

Starting in Week 4 of the competition, the contestants complete performances in one week; however, the eliminated finalist(s) are not announced until the following episode.

The two contestants that will compete in the season's finale will be determined by the results of a vote by the at-home viewers.

Approximately 1.5 Million Votes were cast in the final vote.

Jermaine Sellers was also a contestant on American Idol season 9. He made it to the top 24, but was eliminated in the second week of the semifinal rounds alongside John Park, Michelle Delamor, and Haeley Vaughn.

== The 20 Finalists Season 1 ==
- Week 1 Episode showed highlights of the audition process.

Contestants	Weeks 2-3	Week 4	Week 5	Week 6	Week 7	Week 8	Week 9
Crystal Aikin	Moving On	Moving On	Moving On	Moving On	Moving On	Moving On	WINNER
Shari Addison	Moving On	Moving On	Moving On	Moving On	Moving On	Moving On	Runner up
Jermaine Sellers	Moving On	Moving On	Moving On	Moving On	Moving On	Eliminated	
Emily Gomez	Moving On	Moving On	Moving On	Moving On	Eliminated		
Tasha Collins	Moving On	Moving On	Moving On	Eliminated			
Janice Collins	Moving On	Moving On	Eliminated				
Trevon Davis	Moving On	Moving On	Eliminated				
Queensley Felix	Moving On	Eliminated					
Kenya Glover	Moving On	Eliminated					
Corey Webb	Moving On	Eliminated					
Melody Betts	Eliminated						
Yvonne Cobbs-Bey	Eliminated						
Deanna Dixon	Eliminated						
Christal Garrick	Eliminated						
Juanell Johnson	Eliminated						
Saudia Mills	Eliminated						
Daniel Parra	Eliminated						
Charisma Sweat	Eliminated						
Tamara Thomas	Eliminated						
Billy Walls	Eliminated						

== Contestants songs ==
Contestants	Week 2–3	Week 4	Week 5	Week 6	Week 7	Week 8	Week 9
Trevon	"Sweeping Through the City" by Shirley Caesar	"Mary Don't You Weep"	"That's the Way God Planned It"				
Tamara	"I Need You Now" by Smokie Norful						
Janice	"Glorious" by Martha Munizzi	"Blessed Like That"	"Merce Mercy Me"				
Saudia	"Stand" by Donnie McClurkin						
Shari	"You Brought the Sunshine" by The Clark Sisters	"Good Time"	"Sing a Song"				
Jermaine	"Tis so Sweet" by Alan Jackson	"Tomorrow"	"Keep Your Head to the Sky"				
Melody	"Reason Why We Sing" by Kirk Franklin						
Kenya	"Can't Give Up Now" by Mary Mary	"For Every Mountain"					
Daniel	"Mighty High" by The Mighty Clouds of Joy						
Christal	"He Cares" Luther Barnes & The Red Budd Gospel Choir						
Deanna	"Jesus be a fence" by Fred Hammond						
Charisma	"We Fall Down" by Donnie McClurkin						
Queensley	"Going up Yonder"	"Silver and Gold"					
Corey	"Jesus Can Work It Out"	"Look at Me"					
Yvonne	"Spirit of the Lord" by Fred Hammond						
Juanell	"Coming Out of the Dark"						
Emily	"Excellent Lord"	"Presence of the Lord is Here"	"Jesus is Love"				
Crystal	"Alabaster Box"	"Running Back to You"	"What's Going On"				
Lawrence	"Changed"						
Tasha	"I Love the Lord"	"For Once in My Life"	"You Bring Out the Best in Me"				

== Episode guide ==
October 2, 2007	In the first episode, judges held auditions in three cities: Chicago, Atlanta, and Los Angeles. They selected six finalists from each city. The nineteenth contestant was selected by voters at BET.com, and the twentieth was a Wild Card selection of the judges. The BET.com selection was Yvonne Cobbs-Bey and the Wild Card pick was Shari Addison.
October 9, 2007	Episode Two opened with a group performance from all twenty contestants followed by individual performances by ten of the contestants. Moving forward from this round were Trevon Davis, Jermaine Sellers, Kenya Glover, Shari Addison, and Janice Collins.
October 16, 2007	Episode Three opened with a recap of the previous episode, followed by individual performances by the last ten contestants. Moving forward from this round were Queensley Felix, Corey Webb, Emily Gomez, Crystal Aikin, and Tasha Collins.
October 23, 2007	In Episode Four the top ten performers from the two previous weeks came together to compete against each other. Each performed one selection, and the seven moving forward from this round were Trevon Davis, Jermaine Sellers, Shari Addison, Janice Collins, Emily Gomez, Crystal Aikin, and Tasha Collins.
October 30, 2007	In Episode Five the remaining seven finalists performed a mix of R&B and gospel hits. The five moving forward from this round were Jermaine Sellers, Shari Addison, Emily Gomez, Crystal Aikin, and Tasha Collins.
November 6, 2007	In Episode Six the remaining five contestants performed classic gospel anthems. The contestants were mentored by gospel singer Tye Tribbett for this episode. The four moving forward from this round were Jermaine Sellers, Shari Addison, Emily Gomez, and Crystal Aikin.
November 13, 2007	In Episode Seven the remaining contestants were coached by gospel artist Martha Munizzi. Each contestant performed one selection. The three moving forward from this round were Jermaine Sellers, Shari Addison, and Crystal Aikin.
November 20, 2007	Episode Eight opened with a group performance from Gospel legend Pastor Shirley Caesar and the final three hopefuls. The contestants then went on to perform two selections of their choosing. The two moving forward in this round will be determined by the voting of the home viewers.
November 27, 2007	Episode Nine began with a performance from Gospel and R&B singer Stephanie Mills and the three remaining contestants. Afterward, it was revealed that the eliminated contestant was Jermaine Sellers, who then performed one final selection. Later the final two contestants sang two selections of the judges' choice. Finally, Stephanie Mills returned to sing another selection to close the show.
December 4, 2007	The Live Season Finale opened with a performance from Kirk Franklin during which all ten finalists reunited on stage, the performance was then followed by a Video recap of the entire season. Next, Shari Addison performed her final solo selection, after which Crystal Aikin performed a solo selection. Following the finalist's performances, gospel sensation Yolanda Adams performed a selection. Later, the two finalists then returned to the stage to perform a duet. Finally, the show closed with the announcement that the winner was Crystal Aikin.
