= Lisa Page Brooks =

American gospel singer

- Born: Lisa Charise Harris; November 23, 1963 (age 62); Detroit, Michigan
- Genres: Gospel, traditional black gospel, urban contemporary gospel
- Occupations: Singer, songwriter
- Instruments: vocals(alto), singer-songwriter
- Years active: 1986–present
- Labels: A&M, Air Gospel, Habakkuk
- Formerly of: WItness

Lisa Charise Brooks (née, Harris; born November 23, 1963) is an American urban contemporary gospel, traditional black gospel, and gospel music recording artist and musician. She started her music career, in 1986, with her quartet, Witness. Her solo music career began in 1997, while she has since released four solo studio albums, More Than You'll Ever Know in 1997, Lisa Page Brooks in 2001, Strong in 2009, and Ready in 2013. Three of those albums charted on the Billboard magazine charts.

== Early life ==
Page Brooks was born Lisa Charise Harris, on November 23, 1963, in Detroit, Michigan, the daughter of Charles Warren Harris (1942–2002) and Shirley Ann Harris (née, Earnest) (1940–2004).

== Music career ==
Her music career started in 1986, with the female black gospel quartet, Witness. She commenced her solo music recording career in 1997, with the studio album, More Than You'll Ever Know, that was released on April 8, 1997, from A&M Records. This was her breakthrough release upon the Billboard magazine charts, while it placed on the Gospel Albums chart, where it peaked at No. 32. Her subsequent studio album, Lisa Page Brooks, was released on July 31, 2001, with Air Gospel. The third album, Strong, was released on October 20, 2009, by Habakkuk Music, and this album peaked at No. 18 on the Billboard Gospel Albums chart. She released, Ready, on June 4, 2013, where this album peaked at No. 17 on the Billboard Gospel Albums chart.

== Personal life ==
Since January 31, 1997, she was married to Bishop Michael Alan Brooks of gospel group, Commissioned; Bishop Brooks died July 16, 2024. Together they resided in Birmingham, Michigan. Brooks is also the mother of fellow gospel singer Tasha Page-Lockhart.

== Discography ==
=== Studio albums ===
List of studio albums, with selected chart positions
Title	Album details	Peak chart positions
Title	Album details	US Gos
More Than You ll Ever Know	Released: April 8, 1997; Label: A&M; CD, digital download	32
Lisa Page Brooks	Released: July 31, 2001; Label: AIR; CD, digital download	–
Strong	Released: October 20, 2009; Label: Habakkuk; CD, digital download	18
Ready	Released: June 4, 2013; Label: Habakkuk; CD, digital download	17
