= Sunday Best season 2 =

Sunday Best
- Season 2
- Starring: Kirk Franklin; Bebe Winans; Erica Campbell; Tina Campbell

Release
- Original network: BET

Season chronology
- ← Previous; Season 1 Next → Season 3

Sunday Best is a reality television series on BET.

Kirk Franklin, BeBe Winans and Tina and Erica Campbell of Mary Mary returned as Host and judges, respectively.

For Season Two, episode tapings were moved from Los Angeles, CA, to Atlanta, GA.

During the finale on May 11, 2009, Y'Anna Crawley was announced as Season 2's winner while Jessica Reedy was determined to be the runner up .
