= Joshua Rogers =

American gospel singer (born 1994)

- Born: Joshua Rogers; March 22, 1994 (age 32); Greeleyville, South Carolina, U.S.
- Genres: Gospel
- Occupation: Singer
- Instruments: Vocals, drums
- Years active: 2012–present
- Label: Music World (2012–present)
- Website: www.thejoshuarogers.com

Joshua Rogers (born March 22, 1994) is an American gospel singer who rose to prominence in 2012 when he became the first male and youngest winner of Black Entertainment Television's Sunday Best during the show's fifth season.

== Early life and education ==
A native of Greeleyville, South Carolina, Rogers grew up singing and playing the drums in the Apostolic church pastored by his grandmother. He graduated from C.E. Murray High School in 2012.

== Sunday Best ==
Rogers auditioned for the fifth season of Sunday Best in Atlanta, and was immediately a favorite of fans and the celebrity judging panel of Yolanda Adams, Donnie McClurkin, and CeCe Winans. Sunday Best host Kirk Franklin gave Rogers the nickname "Young Buck". After weeks of consistent performances of songs such as Vanessa Bell Armstrong's "Peace Be Still", Deitrick Haddon's "Well Done", and Andrae Crouch's "We Expect You", Rogers landed in the finals of Sunday Best alongside another teen singer, Alexis Spight, with Rogers ultimately going on to win. He became the show's first male and youngest champion. With his win, Rogers received a cash prize, a 2013 Ford Escape, and a recording contract with Music World Entertainment.

== After Sunday Best ==
Rogers released his first album, Well Done, on December 4, 2012. The album featured songs performed by Rogers on Sunday Best. Well Done debuted at #1 on the Billboard Gospel Album Charts with 5,917 sales in its first week.

Rogers released his second album, Unconditional, on October 29, 2013. This is his first album of original music and he co-wrote some of the songs. It debuted at #2 on the Billboard Gospel Album charts.

== Discography ==
- Well Done (2012)
- Unconditional (2013)
- Returning (2018)

Preceded by Amber Bullock	Sunday Best winner 2012	Succeeded by Tasha Page-Lockhart
