= Renee Spearman =

American singer-songwriter

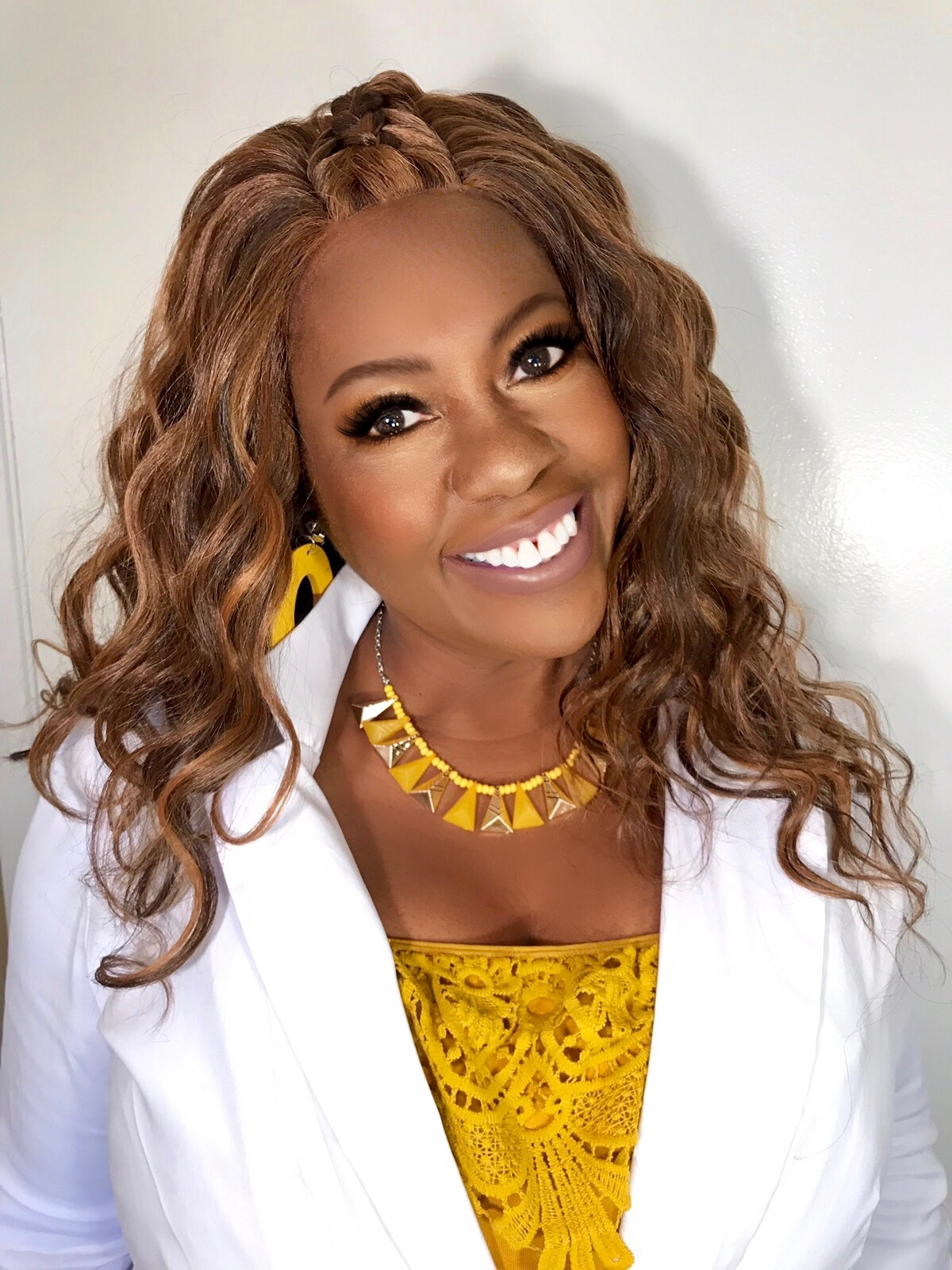
Renee Spearman single "I Love Him" artwork 2019

Renee Spearman (born March 3, 1969, in Lynwood, CA) is an American gospel singer, songwriter, and producer.

As a child, Spearman was involved heavily in the music department at her church where her father, Ernest Spearman, pastored. Her mother, Maude "Doll" Spearman was very influential in her music life as well.

Her career began in the early 1990s, where she established The Prosperity Crusade Choir. While the choir were still in establishment; Renee Spearman and Gospel figure, Prez Blackmon, created the duo "Renee Spearman and Prez" (also known as Renee and Prez). Her solo career began in the early 2010s, where had released one album which charted at number 4 on the Billboard Gospel Album Chart, number 37 on the Billboard Independent Albums Chart and Billboard Top 200.

She has worked on a number of different albums with a variety of different artists including: Gladys Knight in At Last in 2001 and Yolanda Adams on The Experience in 2002.

In her own recordings, she has worked with: Dr. Bobby Jones of BET, Byron Cage, Beverly Crawford, DJ Rogers and Paul Jackson Jr.

Spearman is a 2010 Stellar Award nominee and, in 2008, her album He Changed Me, reached number 13 on the Billboard Gospel Chart.

Renee's 2019 single "I Love Him", featuring Hezekiah Walker & Dr. Holly Carter, debuted on the Billboard Gospel Airplay Chart.

== Discography ==
- (1995) Change The World
- (1997) From A Songwriter's Perspective
- (2002) Celebrate
- (2008) He Changed Me
- (2012) Whoa To Wow
- (2014) "Rejoice With Me!"
- (2017) "Good Morning (You Made It!)
- (2019) "I Love Him" featuring Hezekiah Walker & Dr. Holly Carter Gospel Airplay
