= Geoffrey Golden =

American gospel musician (born 1994)

- Birth name: Geoffrey Dickerson Golden
- Born: April 26, 1994 (age 30); Cleveland, Ohio
- Origin: Atlanta, Georgia
- Genres: Gospel, urban contemporary gospel
- Occupation(s): Singer, songwriter
- Instrument(s): vocals, singer-songwriter
- Years active: 2014–present
- Labels: RCA Inspiration, Fo Yo Soul
- Website: facebook.com/geoffreydgolden

Geoffrey Dickerson Golden (born April 26, 1994) is an American gospel musician. His music career started in 2014, with the appearance and victory on the gospel singing competition, Sunday Best. He released, a live album, Kingdom...LIVE!, with RCA Inspiration and Fo Yo Soul Recordings, in 2015. This album was his Billboard magazine breakthrough release.

== Early life ==
Geoffrey Dickerson Golden was born on April 26, 1994, in Cleveland, Ohio, the son of a pastor, Eld. Kevin Dickerson Golden, at Glenville Church of Christ (Holiness) USA or COCHUSA, and his mother, Beverly Susan Golden (née, Moore), where he is the youngest, having two brothers and one sister. He graduated from Cleveland Heights High School, in 2012. He also directed the youth choir at East View United Church of Christ in Shaker Heights, Ohio. His collegiate musical career occurred in Atlanta, Georgia, at Morehouse College, where in 2016, he graduated.

== Music career ==
His music recording career commenced in 2014, with the victory on Sunday Best, a gospel singing competition, occurring on BET, during season 7. He released, Kingdom...LIVE!', on August 7, 2015, with RCA Inspiration and Fo Yo Soul Recordings, and this album was recorded live in Irving, Texas at Irving Bible College, where it was hosted by Kirk Franklin. This live album was his breakthrough release upon the Billboard magazine charts, where it placed at No. 4 on the Top Gospel Albums chart. The single, "All of My Help", placed at No. 18 on the Gospel Digital Songs chart.

== Discography ==
List of albums, with selected chart positions
Title	Album details	Peak chart positions
Title	Album details	US Gos
Kingdom...LIVE!	Released: August 7, 2015; Label: RCA Inspiration/Fo Yo Soul; CD, digital download	4

Preceded by Tasha Page-Lockhart	Sunday Best winner 2014	Succeeded by Dathan Thigpen
