= J. Brown (American singer) =

American singer-songwriter from Detroit

- Born: John Brown; Detroit, Michigan, U.S.
- Genres: R&B; soul
- Occupations: Singer; songwriter
- Instruments: Vocals; Piano; Organ; Guitar
- Labels: Clef Records/J.Records; Universal Republic; Mocha Music
- Website: www.jbrownmusiconly.com

John Brown, better known by his stage name J. Brown, is an American singer and songwriter from Detroit, Michigan. He is currently signed to MoCha Music/SRG-ILS Group. His 2018 single, "Sunrise Sunset", peaked at number 10 on the Adult R&B Billboard Charts. His 2020 single, "Moon", reached number 7 in the same category. He has had singles reach the Billboard Charts each year, consecutively, since 2018.

His previously released songs, "Imma Love You Right" and "Sex on My Money", are credited under John Brown and released by Universal Republic.

== Early life ==
Brown is the youngest of five children. He began singing in his father's choir at church and, later, became involved with the Detroit's Mosaic Youth Theatre. This provided him the opportunity to sing the National Anthem for the Detroit Pistons and the Detroit Lions, as well as to sing for former president Bill Clinton.

== Musical career ==
Brown, Robert Curry (Making The Band 4, Day 26), and two other singers formed the group E2G while Brown was still attending high school. They auditioned for Wyclef Jean of the Fugees and were signed to Clef Records/J Records. The group eventually disbanded and Brown took the opportunity to attend Grambling State University on a full academic scholarship.

Brown has been a supporting act for Trey Songz, Ruben Studdard, and Lil Boosie. On October 24, 2019, he shared the stage with Stevie Wonder.

Brown announced that his EP would be released on January 24, 2020, and performed his new single, "Moon", on Fox 29 in Philadelphia.

He was listed as the supporting act for Elle Varner's Ellevation Tour 2020.

In 2021, J. Brown opened for both Nelly and Anthony Hamilton in separate tours as an independent artist.

== Personal life ==
The Recording Academy published an article on J. Brown in September 2020. According to it, Brown credits meditation as his way of finding calm in times of civil, political, and economic unrest.

== Discography ==
=== Singles ===
Year	Song	U.S. Peak R&B Billboard
2010	"Imma Love You Right"	
2010	"Sex on My Money" (featuring Gucci Mane)	
2018	"Sunrise Sunset"	10
2019	"Give It 2 U"	15
2020	"Moon"	7
2021	"Vibe"	10
2022	"Don't Rush"	7
2023	"My Whole Heart"	1

=== EP ===
Year	Title
2020	Forever Yours

=== Album ===
Year	Title
2022	CHAPTER & VERSE
2023	THE ART OF MAKING LOVE
