= Eternal life =

Eternal life or life eternal may refer to:

- Immortality, the ability to live forever
  - Eternal life (Christianity), a Christian belief
- "Eternal Life" (song), a 1995 song by Jeff Buckley
- Life Eternal (album), a 2009 album by Mayhem
- Life Eternal (film), a 2015 Austrian-German black comedy crime film
- "Life Eternal" (song), a 2018 song by Ghost
- Eternal Life, a 2018 novel by Dara Horn

== See also ==
- Eternal (disambiguation)
- Immortal (disambiguation)
