= Everlasting Life =

Studio album by Kim Burrell
- Released: November 24, 1998
- Genre: Gospel, jazz
- Length: 48:15
- Label: Tommy Boy Gospel
- Producer: Alex Asaph Ward

Kim Burrell chronology
Try Me Again (1995)	Everlasting Life (1998)	Live in Concert (2001)

Professional ratings
Review scores
Source	Rating
AllMusic	link

Everlasting Life is the major-label debut album of gospel/jazz singer Kim Burrell. The album won Burrell the 1999 Gospel Music Excellence award for Contemporary Female Vocalist of the Year, as well as the 2000 Stellar Award for Contemporary Female Vocalist of the Year.

== Track listing ==
1. "I'll Keep Holding On" – 2:49
2. "Holy Ghost" – 4:25
3. "Over and Over Again" – 4:55
4. "Oh Lord" – 2:19
5. "I Found Him" – 3:56
6. "Kim's Request" – 1:09
7. "Prodigal Son" – 5:05
8. "Prodigal Son (Reprise)" – 2:03
9. "It's Not Supposed to Be This Way" – 4:04
10. "I Come to You More Than I Give" – 5:26
11. "Lift Jesus" – 6:15
12. "Everlasting Life" – 4:27
13. "Tribute" – 1:43
