= Tasha Page-Lockhart =

American musician

Tasha Page
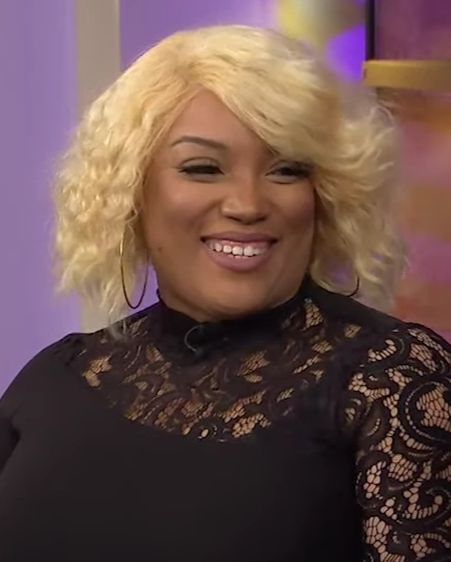
- Page-Lockhart in 2020

Background information
- Born: Natasha Marie Page; March 21, 1983 (age 43); Detroit, Michigan
- Origin: Atlanta, Georgia
- Genres: Christian R&B, black gospel, urban contemporary gospel, contemporary R&B
- Occupations: Singer, songwriter
- Instruments: vocals, singer-songwriter
- Years active: 2003–2004; 2013–present
- Labels: RCA, Fo Yo Soul, Legacy
- Formerly of: Witness
- Website: tashapagelockhart.com

Tasha Page House (born March 21, 1983, as Natasha Marie Page) is an American Christian R&B and urban contemporary gospel artist and musician. She won the gospel singing competition, Sunday Best, in season six of BET. She started her music career in 2014 with the release of Here Right Now by RCA Records and Fo Yo Soul Recordings. Her first studio album, Here Right Now, charted on the Billboard charts The Billboard 200 and Top Gospel Albums.

== Early life ==
Page-Lockhart was born on March 21, 1983, in Detroit, Michigan, as Natasha Marie Page, whose parents are musicians and pastors themselves. Her mother is Pastor Lisa Charise Page Brooks of Witness and of Restoration Fellowship Church International in Detroit and her stepfather was Bishop Michael Alan Brooks of Commissioned. She has two sisters who are younger than she. They are Latia "Tia" Charise Page and Sateara Renee Page, and she also has a brother, Justin. In her childhood, she was molested various times by some family members and trusted family friends. While she was in high school, she played basketball, and had dreams of aspiring to be a WNBA player. Yet, those dreams would soon change, when at 17 years old, she got pregnant, and had a child at 18, causing her to become a high school dropout. This caused her life to spiral out of control, and she got addicted to drugs, causing her childhood boyfriend Clifton to depart for Atlanta, Georgia, in 2006. She got her life under control by eventually relocating to Atlanta, and getting involved in music ministry.

== Music career ==
Her music career started by becoming a part of her mother's women's gospel group, Witness. The solo career started in 2013 with the Sunday Best reality gospel singing competition on BET. She won the show in season six, which granted her a recording contract with RCA Records label, Fo Yo Soul Recordings, which Kirk Franklin is the operator. This allowed her to introduce her first solo studio album, Here Right Now, on August 5, 2014. The album charted on the Billboard charts at No. 87 on The Billboard 200 and at the third position of the Top Gospel Albums chart. This was awarded a three and a half star out of five review from Andy Kellman of AllMusic, while Dwayne Lacy of New Release Tuesday granted the album a four and a half star review out of five. She was nominated for three awards at the 30th Stellar Awards in 2015 winning New Artist of the Year. In 2019 at the 34th Stellar awards she won Contemporary Female vocalist of the year. She won female vocalist of the year at the 2019 Steeple awards. Previously she won female vocalist of the year in the UK for the Gospel Touch Music awards.

== Personal life ==
She married Clifton James "Cliff" Lockhart in July 2006, after relocating to Atlanta. In 2008, they moved back to Detroit, Michigan so she could give birth to their first child among family and friends, but her second child after having Ronald Hughes eight years earlier in 2001. She gave birth to Clifton James Lockhart, II, in 2008.

She and Clifton Lockhart separated in 2017 and divorced in 2018. She began posting pictures of herself with T. Vernon House to her Instagram page, thanking him for "sweeping her off her feet". They married June 8, 2019, in Detroit, Michigan. The ceremony, "House of Love", was officiated by her godfather, King Drolo Bosso Adamtey 1. Many R&B and gospel artists attended.

Page-Lockhart is an honorary member of Sigma Gamma Rho sorority, inducted on July 5, 2025.

== Discography ==
=== Studio albums ===
List of studio albums, with selected chart positions
Title	Album details	Peak chart positions		
Title	Album details	US	US Gos	US Christ/ Gos
Here Right Now	Released: August 5, 2014; Label: RCA/Fo Yo Soul; CD, digital download	87	3	5
The Beautiful Project	Released: October 20, 2017; Label: RCA/Fo Yo Soul; CD, digital download	*	25	*

=== Singles ===
Title	Year	Peak chart position		Album
Title	Year	US GOSP	US Gospel Digital	Album
"Different"	2014	9	—	Here Right Now
"Fragile"	2014	—	—	Here Right Now
"He's on the Way"	2026	—	10	Non-album single

==== As featured artist ====
Title	Year	Peak chart position	Album
Title	Year	US Dig. GOSP	Album
"It's Time" (Kirk Franklin featuring Tasha Page-Lockhart & Zacardi Cortez)	2015	13	Losing My Religion

=== Non Singles ===
Title	Year	Peak chart position	Album
Title	Year	US Dig. GOSP	Album
"I Will Call Upon The Lord"	2013	20	—N/a
"You Bring Out The Best In Me"	2013	10	—N/a
"Don't Do It Without Me"	2013	8	—N/a
"Love" (featuring Kefia Rollerson)	2013	7	—N/a

== Filmography ==
Films
Year	Title	Role	Notes
2014	Madea on the Run	Netta	

Preceded by Joshua Rogers	Sunday Best winner 2013	Succeeded by Geoffrey Golden
