= Amber Bullock =

American musician

- Also known as: Amber Bullock
- Born: Amber Brianna Lawrence-Bullock; April 11, 1986 (age 40); St. Louis, Missouri
- Genres: Contemporary Christian music, black gospel, urban contemporary gospel
- Occupations: Singer, songwriter
- Instruments: vocals, singer-songwriter
- Years active: 2011–present
- Label: Music World Gospel

Amber Brianna Lawrence-Bullock (born April 11, 1986) is an American urban contemporary gospel artist and musician. Bullock won the gospel singing competition, Sunday Best, that airs on BET, during season four. She started her music career, in 2011, with the release of the extended play, Thank You, by Music World Gospel, and this charted on three Billboard charts The Billboard 200, Top Gospel Albums, and the Independent Albums chart. She saw her first studio album, So in Love, chart on two Billboard charts, the Top Gospel Albums and Independent Albums.

== Early life ==
Bullock was born on April 11, 1986, in St. Louis, Missouri, as Amber Brianna Lawrence-Bullock. Before her music career blossomed, with her winning appearance on season four of Sunday Best, she was living in Dallas, Texas at the time, but because of her mother's job promotion at work they moved to New Orleans, Louisiana. While in New Orleans, she got a job at a call center, and during that timespan got involved in an automobile accident that destroyed her car. This forced her to move in with a colleague from work, and send her two-year-old daughter at the time to be raised by her father. When she got the break to be on the show, she had the mentality of "'Lord let your will be done.' I had nothing to lose and everything to gain." In 2011, she graduated from Oakwood University.

== Music career ==
Her music career started on the gospel music reality singing competition television show Sunday Best, in season four, that airs on BET. She won the competition, and got a record deal with Music World Gospel. This allowed her to release an extended play, Thank You, on November 29, 2011, shortly afterward being crowned the winner on the show. The extended play charted on three Billboard charts The Billboard 200 at No. 145, No. 1 on the Top Gospel Albums chart, and No. 10 on the Independent Albums chart. It was rated three and a half stars by AllMusic's David Jeffries, and an eight out of ten by Cross Rhythms' Lins Honeyman. This would be the precursor to her first studio album, So in Love, which released on July 10, 2012, and it charted on two Billboard charts the Top Gospel albums at No. 3 and at the No. 30 position on the Independent Albums chart. The album received a nine out of ten by Cross Rhythms' Lins Honeyman, and E.J. Gaines of UP reports that "So In Love is a solid collection of feel-good music, anchored in soulful melodies and accented by Bullock’s undeniable passion and impeccable vocal agility."

== Personal life ==
Bullock resides in St. Louis, Missouri, with her daughter, and attends church at Fresh Anointing, where Michael Lampkin, a contestant on season five of Sunday Best, is the pastor.

== Discography ==
Studio albums

List of studio albums, with selected chart positions
Title	Album details	Peak chart positions	
Title	Album details	US Gos	US Ind
So in Love	Released: July 10, 2012; Label: Music World Gospel; CD, digital download	3	30

EPs

List of EPs, with selected chart positions
Title	EP details	Peak chart positions		
Title	EP details	US	US Gos	US Ind
Thank You	Released: November 29, 2011; Label: Music World Gospel; CD, digital download	145	1	10

Preceded by Le'Andria Johnson	Sunday Best winner 2011	Succeeded by Joshua Rogers
