= Crystal Aikin =

American gospel singer-songwriter

- Born: Crystal Renee Aikin; September 21, 1974 (age 51); Tacoma, Washington, US
- Genres: CCM, gospel
- Occupation: Singer-songwriter
- Instrument: Vocals
- Label: Verity Gospel Music Group
- Formerly of: Soul, Heaven Sent Us

Crystal Renee Aikin (born September 21, 1974) is an American gospel singer-songwriter from Tacoma, Washington, and the winner of the first season of Sunday Best. Her eponymous debut album was released on January 13, 2009, through Verity Records.

== Biography ==
=== Early life and career ===
Aikin grew up in Tacoma, Washington. From childhood, she attended Altheimer Memorial Church of God in Christ, where she sang in the Sunshine Band. During her teen and young adult years, she sang on the Praise and Worship team while performed as a singer in the Tacoma–Seattle area. During this time, Aikin also obtained a Bachelor's degree in Biology and Psychology.

While a teenager, Aikin was part of a local group called Heaven Sent Us. In the late 1990s, Aikin joined a local singing group called Soul (Hendrix/Trinity Records). The group performed outside the Tacoma area, including at the Gospel Music Workshop of America.

After leaving Soul, Aikin continued singing in the Tacoma area. In 2005, she enrolled at Pacific Lutheran University and obtained a nursing degree. Aikin's mother, a registered nurse also, is a Professor of Nursing at the university. After that, she started working as an emergency room nurse.

=== Sunday Best ===
In 2007, Aikin auditioned for the reality television contest, Sunday Best, a gospel singing competition series. After being chosen to participate, Aikin went to Los Angeles. She won the competition and received a recording contract with Zomba Gospel Music (now Verity Gospel Music Group). She also won a 2008 Toyota Camry.

==== Performances/results ====
Week #	Song choice	Original artist	Order #	Result
3	"Alabaster Box"	CeCe Winans	N/A	Advanced
4	"Running Back to You"	Commissioned	N/A	Advanced
5	"What's Going On"	Marvin Gaye	N/A	Advanced
6	"Shackles"	Mary Mary	N/A	Advanced
7	"Optimistic"	Sounds Of Blackness	N/A	Advanced
8	"Higher Ground"	Stevie Wonder	N/A	Advanced
9				Winner

=== Post Sunday Best career ===
After signing with Verity, Aikin released her eponymous debut album on March 17, 2009. The album featured producer contributions from PAJAM, Dre & Vidal, Gerald Haddon, Derek Clark, and Asaph Ward, among others.

In 2010, she was nominated for a GMA Dove Award for New Artist of the Year at the 41st GMA Dove Awards.

== Discography ==
=== Albums ===
Year	Album details	Peak		Certifications (sales threshold)
Year	Album details	US	Gospel	Certifications (sales threshold)
2009	Crystal Aikin: Released: January 13, 2009; Label: Verity Records; Format: CD	127	3	
2012	Silent Night: Released: October 2012; Label: Verity Records; Format: CD	—	—	
2015	All I Need: Released: 2015; Label: RCA Records; Format: CD	—	8	
"—" denotes releases that did not chart

== Awards and nominations ==
Year	Award	Category	Result	Ref(s)
2010	Stellar Awards	New Artist of the Year Award	Won	
2010	GMA Dove Awards	New Artist of the Year	Nominated	

Preceded by none	Sunday Best winner 2008	Succeeded by Y'Anna Crawley
