= Asaph Ward =

American gospel music record producer

Asaph Alexander Ward is an American gospel music producer, songwriter, arranger, and vocal coach known for his work with prominent gospel artists and award-recognized recordings. Ward has collaborated with artists including Kim Burrell, Dorinda Clark-Cole, Smokie Norful, Donnie McClurkin, The Clark Sisters, Fred Hammond, Virtue, Crystal Aikin, Chrystal Rucker, Maranda Curtis, and Maurette Brown Clark. Recordings produced or contributed to by Ward have received recognition from the Grammy Awards, Stellar Awards, GMA Dove Awards, BMI Trailblazers of Gospel Music Awards, and the NAACP Image Awards. Several projects associated with Ward have also appeared on Billboard gospel charts. Ward is also a personal development coach and public speaker who has presented on topics related to creativity, faith, and personal growth.

== Background ==
Ward developed his musical foundation through church music and vocal training, which later informed his work as a producer, songwriter, and vocal arranger within the contemporary gospel music industry.

As his career progressed, Ward also worked on A Mary Christmas by Mary J. Blige, collaborating with producer David Foster. Ward has also worked in the broader recording industry across both gospel and mainstream music, including credits associated with the R&B group K-Otic.He has cited his experiences in both gospel and R&B as shaping his overall approach to music production and vocal development, particularly in his efforts to inspire and develop artists within contemporary gospel music.

== Career ==
Ward came to prominence in the gospel music industry as the producer of the 1998 album Everlasting Life by Kim Burrell. The project helped introduce Burrell to a wider audience and contributed to her receiving a Stellar Awards for Contemporary Female Artist of the Year.

Ward later produced the self-titled debut album by Dorinda Clark-Cole. The project contributed to Clark-Cole receiving multiple Stellar Awards, including Albertina Walker Female Artist of the Year and Traditional Female Artist of the Year.

He also produced two tracks on the album Nothing Without You by Smokie Norful, which won the Grammy Awards for Best Contemporary Soul Gospel Album.

Ward contributed to the Grammy-winning album Live: One Last Time by The Clark Sisters, which received the Grammy Award for Best Traditional Gospel Album.

He also worked on the Grammy Award-winning song “Wait on the Lord” by Donnie McClurkin featuring Karen Clark Sheard, which won Best Gospel Song.

In addition to these projects, Ward has worked with artists including Crystal Aikin, Kierra Sheard, Maranda Curtis, Maurette Brown Clark, and Virtue. Recordings associated with Ward have received recognition from the Stellar Awards, GMA Dove Awards, and the BMI Trailblazers of Gospel Music Awards.

== Awards and Recognition ==
Recordings produced or contributed to by Ward have received recognition from the Grammy Awards, Stellar Awards, GMA Dove Awards, BMI Trailblazers of Gospel Music Awards, and the NAACP Image Awards.

=== Grammy Awards ===
Projects associated with Ward have received several Grammy recognitions, including:

Year	Artist	Work	Category	Result
2005	Smokie Norful	Nothing Without You	Best Contemporary Soul Gospel Album	Win
2006	Donnie McClurkin feat. Karen Clark Sheard	"Wait on the Lord"	Best Gospel Song	Win
2008	The Clark Sisters	Live: One Last Time	Best Traditional Gospel Album	Win
2006	Dorinda Clark-Cole	Live from Houston: The Rose of Gospel	Best Traditional Soul Gospel Album	Nomination
2009	Dorinda Clark-Cole	Take It Back	Best Traditional Gospel Album	Nomination
2011	Kim Burrell	The Love Album	Best Gospel Album	Nomination
2012	Kierra Sheard	Bold Right Life	Best Gospel Album	Nomination

=== Stellar Awards ===
Recordings produced by Ward have received numerous Stellar Awards honors, including:

Year	Artist	Work	Category	Result
1999	Kim Burrell	Everlasting Life	Contemporary Female Artist of the Year	Win
2003	Dorinda Clark-Cole	Dorinda Clark-Cole	Albertina Walker Female Artist of the Year	Win
2003	Dorinda Clark-Cole	Dorinda Clark-Cole	Traditional Female Artist of the Year	Win
2006	Dorinda Clark-Cole	Live from Houston: The Rose of Gospel	Albertina Walker Female Artist of the Year	Win
2008	Dorinda Clark-Cole	Take It Back	Albertina Walker Female Artist of the Year	Win
2012	Dorinda Clark-Cole	Determined	Traditional Album of the Year	Win
2012	Dorinda Clark-Cole	Determined	Traditional Female Artist of the Year	Win
2008	The Clark Sisters	Live: One Last Time	Artist of the Year	Win
2008	The Clark Sisters	Live: One Last Time	Album of the Year	Win
2008	The Clark Sisters	Live: One Last Time	Duo/Chorus Group of the Year	Win
2008	Vickie Winans	Woman to Woman: Songs of Life	Contemporary Female Artist of the Year	Win
2008	Maurette Brown Clark	The Dream	Praise and Worship Album of the Year	Win
2009	Crystal Aikin	Crystal Aikin	Contemporary Female Artist of the Year	Win
2009	Crystal Aikin	Crystal Aikin	New Artist of the Year	Win
2007	The Anointed Pace Sisters	Access Granted	Traditional Group/Duo of the Year	Nomination
2015	Larry Callahan and Selected of God	Dwell in Me	Traditional Choir of the Year	Nomination

=== Dove Awards ===
Projects associated with Ward have also received recognition from the GMA Dove Awards, including:

Year	Artist	Work	Category	Result
2012	Donnie McClurkin	Duets	Traditional Gospel Album of the Year	Win
2016	Maranda Curtis	"I'm All In"	Traditional Gospel Recorded Song of the Year	Win
2004	Virtue	Free	Urban Album of the Year	Win
2011	Kierra Sheard	Bold Right Life	Gospel Album of the Year	Nomination
2006	Londa Larmond	Love Letters	Urban Album of the Year	Nomination
2009	Crystal Aikin	Crystal Aikin	New Artist of the Year	Nomination

=== BMI Awards ===
Songs produced or written by Ward have received recognition from the BMI Trailblazers of Gospel Music Awards, including:

- Maranda Curtis – “I'm All In” – Most Performed Gospel Song
- Fred Hammond – “Alright” – Most Performed Gospel Song
- Dorinda Clark-Cole – Take It Back – Song of the Year

=== NAACP Image Awards ===
- Donnie McClurkin – Duets – Outstanding Gospel Album (Nominee)
- Kim Burrell – A Different Place – Outstanding Gospel Album (Nominee)

== Production Discography ==
- 1996 – Men of Standard – Men of Standard (Muscle Shoals)
- 1998 – Kim Burrell – Everlasting Life (Tommy Boy Gospel)
- 2001 – The Tommies – Real (Word Records)
- 2002 – Dorinda Clark-Cole – Dorinda Clark-Cole (Gospo Centric)
- 2002 – Brent Jones – "Spiritual Things" (EMI Gospel)
- 2002 – Brent Jones – "Holy Ghost High" (EMI Gospel)
- 2002 – Brent Jones – "Midnite" (EMI Gospel)
- 2003 – Virtue – Free (Verity Records)
- 2003 – Virtue – "Lord I Lift My Hands" (Verity Records)
- 2003 – Virtue – "Worthy" (Verity Records)
- 2003 – Virtue – "Open Arms" (Verity Records)
- 2003 – Virtue – "Nothing Else I Can Do" (Verity Records)
- 2003 – Virtue – "Everything Will Be Alright" (Verity Records)
- 2004 – Twinkie Clark – Home Once Again: Live in Detroit (Verity)
- 2004 – Londa Larmond – Love Letters (EMI Gospel)
- 2004 – Shea Norman – My Heart Depends on You (Verity)
- 2004 – Smokie Norful – Nothing Without You (EMI Gospel)
- 2004 – Benita Washington – Hold On (Compendia Music Group / Light Records)
- 2005 – Dorinda Clark-Cole – The Rose of Gospel (Gospo Centric)
- 2005 – Maurette Brown Clark – The Dream (Atlanta)
- 2005 – Evelyn Turrentine-Agee – Go Through (Light Records)
- 2005 – Joann Rosario – Now More Than Ever… Worship (F. Hammond Music / Verity)
- 2006 – Coko – "Endow Me" (feat. Fantasia, Faith Evans & Lil Mo) (Light / Artemis)
- 2006 – Vickie Winans – "Angel of Mine"
- 2007 – Dijion – Kid's Point of View (Verity)
- 2008 – Donnie McClurkin – We All Are One (Live in Detroit) (Verity)
- 2008 – Dorinda Clark-Cole – Take It Back (Verity)
- 2008 – Crystal Aikin – Crystal Aikin (Zomba)
- 2008 – The Clark Sisters – Live: One Last Time (EMI Gospel)
- 2009 – Kierra Sheard – Bold Right Life (EMI)
- 2009 – The Anointed Pace Sisters – Access Granted (Tyscot)
- 2009 – The Clark Family Experience – Clark Family Christmas (Karew / EMI)
- 2010 – Lowell Pye – Finally (Miralex Entertainment)
- 2011 – Kim Burrell – The Love Album (E One)
- 2011 – Dorinda Clark-Cole – I Survived (Light Records)
- 2011 – Maurette Brown Clark – Sound of Victory (Atlanta)
- 2012 – Larry Callahan & Selected of God – Dwell In Me (8th Mile)
- 2013 – Mary J. Blige – A Mary Christmas (Verve)
- 2015 – Donnie McClurkin – Duets (Verity)
- 2015 – Kim Burrell – A Different Place (Shanachie)
- 2015 – Crystal Aikin – So Amazing (Verity)
- 2016 – Grace – Grace (Dexterity Sounds)
- 2016 – Virtue – "Miracle" (from Fearless)
- 2018 – Kim Burrell – "Drummer Boy" (IndieBlu Music)
- 2019 – Maranda Curtis – "I'm All In"
- 2019 – Chrystal Rucker – "Take Your Burdens"
- 2019 – Fred Hammond – "Alright"
- 2021 – Fred Hammond – Sunday Morning Fred
- 2021 – Fred Hammond – "Hallelujah"
- 2024 – Dorinda Clark-Cole – Determined
- 2024 – Otis Kemp – Meet Me in Miami (Revive 5.0 Entertainment)
- 2025 – Asaph Ward – Psalms of Asaph
- 2025 – The Jesus Collective – FLOW, Vol. 1 (Live in South Africa)
- 2025 – Sharon Ann – Sacred Disruption
- 2026 – Renee Spearman – "You Chose Me" (feat. Montell Jordan & Kim Burrell)

== Selected Production Discography ==
- Kim Burrell – Everlasting Life (Tommy Boy Gospel)
- Smokie Norful – Nothing Without You (EMI Gospel)
- The Clark Sisters – Live: One Last Time (EMI Gospel)
- Donnie McClurkin – We Are One – “Wait on the Lord” (Verity)
- Donnie McClurkin – Duets (Verity)
- Dorinda Clark-Cole – Dorinda Clark-Cole (Gospo Centric)
- Dorinda Clark-Cole – Take It Back (Zomba Label Group)
- Fred Hammond – “Alright”
- Fred Hammond – “Hallelujah”
- Maranda Curtis – “I'm All In”
- Crystal Aikin – Crystal Aikin (Zomba)
- Kierra Sheard – Bold Right Life (EMI Gospel)
- Virtue – Free (Verity Records)
