= Kim Burrell =

American gospel singer

Pastor Kim Burrell
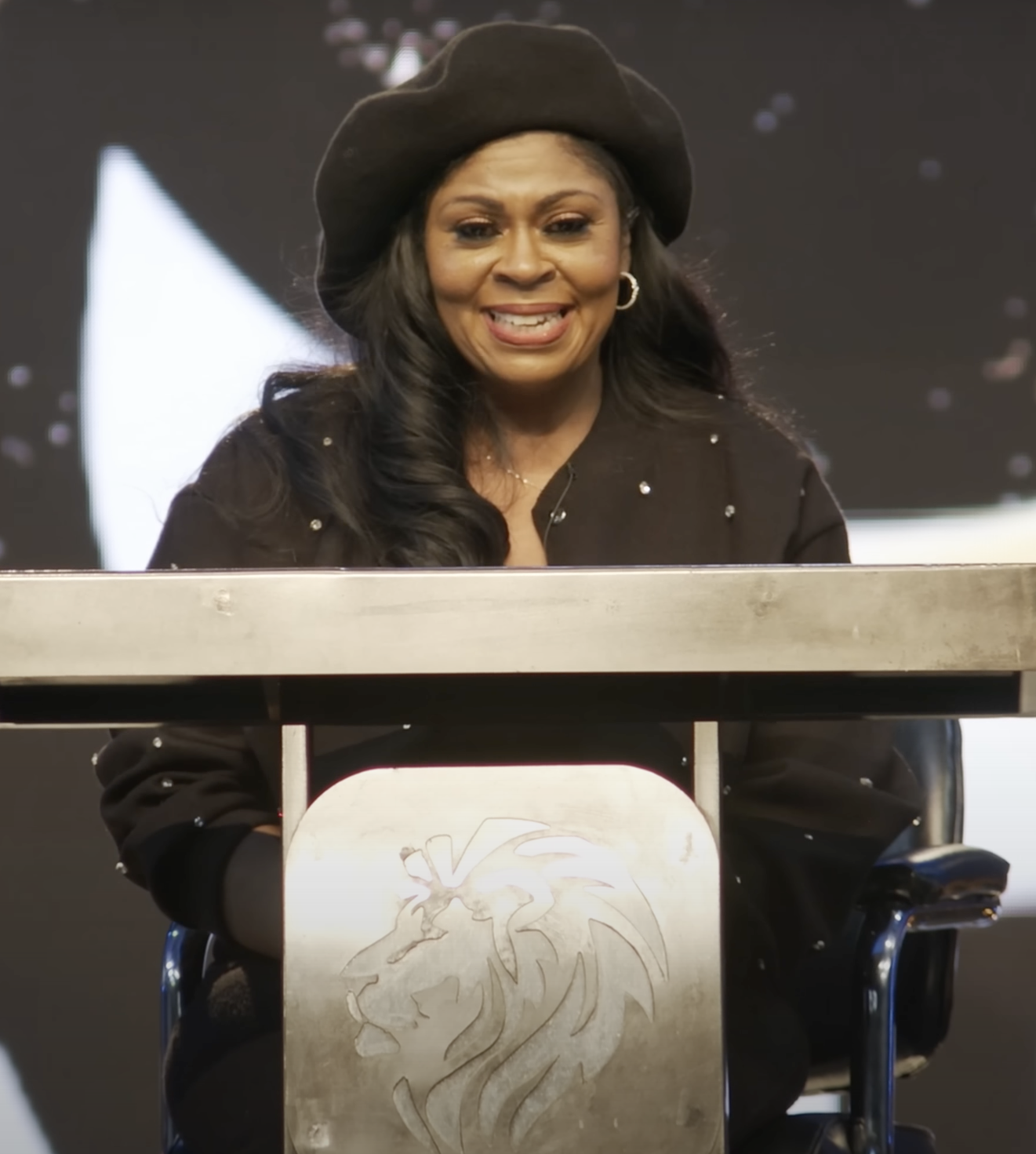
- Burrell in January 2024

Background information
- Born: Kimberly Jean Burrell; August 26, 1972 (age 54); Houston, Texas, U.S.
- Genres: Gospel; jazz
- Occupations: Singer; songwriter; arranger; producer; pastor
- Years active: 1989–present
- Labels: Pearl Records; Tommy Boy Gospel; Elektra; Epic; Sony; Shanachie; New Brand
- Website: kimburrellministries.com

Kimberly Jean Burrell (born August 26, 1972) is an American gospel singer, songwriter, and pastor from Houston, Texas.

== Early life ==
Born Kimberly Jean Burrell on August 26, 1972, in Houston, Texas, Burrell was one of four children born to Julius Burrell Jr., a pastor, and Helen Ruth Graham, an evangelist singer in The Church of God in Christ. As a youth, Burrell began performing with Reverend James Cleveland's GMWA Youth Mass Choir (also known as Rev. James Cleveland's Kids).

== Career ==
=== 1989–2003 ===
Burrell's performances continued with Trinity Temple Full Gospel Mass Choir of Dallas and The Inspirational Sounds Mass Choir of Houston. In 1996, she was a featured singer on the reprise of "Jesus Paid It All" on Ricky Dillard & New G's album Worked It Out. Her first independent album, Try Me Again, was released on the Texas-based boutique label Pearl Records in 1995. This led to her being signed to Tommy Boy Gospel and releasing another album, Everlasting Life (1998), produced by Asaph Alexander Ward. The album peaked at #10 on the Billboard Gospel Charts. Burrell recorded Live In Concert, a live album in November 2000 at the annual COGIC Holy Convocation in Memphis, Tennessee. The album was released in 2001. It was nominated for a Grammy Award for Best Soul Gospel Album in 2002. Though Tommy Boy Gospel closed shortly after the release of Live In Concert, by 2002, she had signed a recording contract with Elektra Records. Under this contract she recorded only a guest appearance on the all-star gospel track "Higher Ground", which first appeared as a bonus track on Missy Elliott's album Miss E... So Addictive and was later featured on Karen Clark Sheard's 2nd Chance album. Burrell has continued to perform live and to collaborate with other artists. Though only intermittently active as a recording artist, she established and hosts the annual Ephesians 4 conference, a workshop for performing artists.

=== 2004–present ===
In 2004, Burrell was a guest performer along with Kelly Price on R. Kelly's "3-Way Phone Call" playing the part of Price's "prayer partner" in the soap opera-like song. She appeared in George Clinton's original song "Mathematics of Love" on Clinton's 2008 album of covers, George Clinton and Some Gangsters of Love. Burrell released her first studio album in 11 years, No Ways Tired, on April 7, 2009, through Shanachie Records. The album features covers of classic gospel songs like "My Faith Looks Up To Thee," "What A Friend We Have In Jesus," "O Lamb Of God" and "I Surrender All," as well as the classic James Cleveland song after which the album is named.

In 2010, Burrell founded the Love & Liberty Fellowship Church in Houston, Texas, and serves as its senior pastor. She was installed as Senior Pastor on September 4, 2010. Her longtime friend Whitney Houston was among the attendees and remained an active supporter of Burrell and her ministry until Houston's passing in 2012.

Burrell has uncredited vocals on Frank Ocean’s “Godspeed” from his 2016 album Blonde. Burrell sang "I see a Victory" with Pharrell Williams for the soundtrack to the feature film Hidden Figures (2016).

In December 2016, a video surfaced showing Burrell preaching a sermon at the Love & Liberty Fellowship Church. In that sermon, she called people who engage in homosexual acts "perverted" and said they had been deceived by the "homosexual spirit." She also warned that people who "play with" homosexual sin would "die from it" in 2017. In response to considerable criticism, Burrell said that she makes "no excuses or apologies" for the sermon, adding "I love you, and God loves you, but he hates the sin in you and me." Shortly after the video of the sermon surfaced, The Ellen DeGeneres Show canceled Burrell's scheduled appearance, as did the BMI Trailblazers of Gospel Music event, where she was removed as an honoree. Her radio talk show, Bridging the Gap with Kim Burrell, was canceled by Texas Southern University. In 2024, Burrell made a statement that included the following regarding her past comments: "You know, we have a church lingo. We have a church jargon that everybody doesn’t get. And sometimes you have to say it for the people in the back. And for that, I want to apologize to the LGBTQ community."

== Selected discography ==
=== Albums ===
- Try Me Again (Pearl, 1995)
- Everlasting Life (Tommy Boy Gospel, 1998)
- Live In Concert (Tommy Boy Gospel, 2001)
- No Ways Tired (Shanachie, 2009)
- The Love Album (Shanachie, 2011)
- A Different Place (Shanachie, 2015)

=== Singles ===
- "Special Place" (Bad Boy Entertainment, 2001)
- "Little Drummer Boy" (New Brand Records, 2018)
- "Working For Your Good" (New Brand Records & Malloy Entertainment, 2022)

=== Videos ===
- Live In Concert (VHS) (Tommy Boy Gospel, 2001)

=== Other appearances ===
Year	Title	Artist	Album	Label
1990	"Praise Him"	GMWA National Youth Mass Choir	Win The World For Christ	Sweet Rain
1996	"Jesus Paid It All"	Ricky Dillard & New G	Worked It Out	Crystal Rose
1998	"Can't Nobody Do Me Like Jesus (Remix)"	Trinity Temple Mass Choir featuring Kim Burrell	Gospel Out-Takes: Unreleased Music	Tyscot
2000	"Woman"	Kim Burrell with Montrel Darrett	J2K Jesus 2000	EMI Gospel
2000	"God's Favor"	Tri-City Singers featuring Karen Clark-Sheard, Kim Burrell, and Kelly Price	Tri-City4.com	EMI Gospel
2001	"Special Place"	Kim Burrell	Thank You (Unreleased)	Bad Boy
2002	"The Lord Will Make A Way Somehow"	Hezekiah Walker & The Love Fellowship Choir	Family Affair II: Live At Radio City Music Hall	Verity
2001	"Higher Ground"	Missy Elliott feat. Yolanda Adams, Dorinda Clark Cole, Karen Clark-Sheard, Mary Mary & Kim Burrell	Miss E...So Addictive	Elektra
2002	"The Moment I Prayed"	Kirk Whalum featuring Kim Burrell	The Gospel According to Jazz, Chapter II	Word
2002	"I'm Gonna Praise Him"	Kim Burrell	Gospel Today Presents: Praise and Worship 2002	Verity
2003	"We Praise You Lord"	Shirley Caesar featuring Kim Burrell	Shirley Caesar & Friends	Word
2003	"Go Tell It"	Gary Mayes & Nu Era featuring Kim Burrell	Go Tell It: The N.E. X-Perience, Vol. 2	Gvm Soul Muzick
2003	"I Pray On Christmas"	Harry Connick, Jr. featuring Kim Burrell	Harry For The Holidays (DVD-only bonus track)	Columbia
2003	"Try Jesus" "O When I Come" "Family That Prays Together"	The Stewart Singers featuring Kim Burrell	Back to the Roots	Independent
2004	"3-Way Phone Call"	R. Kelly featuring Kim Burrell & Kelly Price	Happy People/U Saved Me	Jive
2004	"You Can Change"	Tye Tribbett & G.A. featuring Kim Burrell	Life	Columbia/Sony Gospel
2005	"Soldier"	The Andrews Brothers featuring Kim Burrell	Free Indeed	Sic Records
2005	"If Your Love Cannot Be Moved"	Stevie Wonder featuring Kim Burrell	A Time 2 Love	Motown
2005	"Not Until"	Lexi featuring Kim Burrell	A Praise in the Valley [Live]	Holy Music
2006	"Everything Will Be Alright (reprise)"	Tye Tribbett & G.A. featuring Kim Burrell	Victory Live	Columbia/Sony Gospel
2006	"All These People" (single) (all proceeds to New Orleans Habitat Musicians' Village)	Harry Connick Jr featuring Kim Burrell	Oh My NOLA	Columbia
2007	"Over and Over Again"	VaShawn Mitchell featuring Kim Burrell	Promises	Tyscot
2007	"Journey"	Richard Smallwood featuring Kim Burrell	Journey: Live In New York	Verity
2007	"If You Never"	Byron Cage featuring Kim Burrell & J. Moss	Live At the Apollo: The Proclamation	GospoCentric/Zomba Gospel
2007	"Try"	Marvin Winans featuring Kim Burrell	Alone But Not Alone	PureSprings Gospel
2007	"I Come To Thee"	Sean Jones featuring Kim Burrell	Kaleidoscope	Mack Avenue
2007	"You're the Reason"	Sean Jones featuring Kim Burrell	Kaleidoscope	Mack Avenue
2008	"I Understand"	Kim Burrell, Rance Allen, BeBe Winans, Mariah Carey & Hezekiah Walker's Love Fellowship Tabernacle Choir	Randy Jackson's Music Club: Volume One	Concord Music Group
2008	"He Has Made Me Glad"	Tye Tribbett & GA featuring Kim Burrell	Stand Out	Columbia/Integrity
2008	"Mathematics of Love"	George Clinton featuring Kim Burrell	George Clinton and Some Gangsters of Love	Shanachie Records
2008	"Song for the Hopeful"	Harry Connick, Jr. featuring Kim Burrell	What a Night! A Christmas Album	Columbia/Sony
2008	"Let There Be Peace On Earth	Harry Connick, Jr. featuring Kim Burrell	What a Night! A Christmas Album	Columbia/Sony
2012	"I Win"	John P. Kee featuring Kim Burrell	Life & Favor	Kee Music Group
2012	"My Worship Remix	John P. Kee featuring Kim Burrell	Life & Favor	Kee Music Group
2012	"With You"	James Fortune featuring Kim Burrell	Identity	E1 Entertainment
2016	"Godspeed"	Frank Ocean featuring Kim Burrell	blond	Boys Don't Cry
2016	"I See A Victory"	Pharrell Williams & Kim Burrell	Hidden Figures Soundtrack	Columbia/Sony
2016	"Na You"	Dunsin Oyekan & Kim Burrell	Code Red	
2017	"4:44"	Jay Z featuring Kim Burrell	4:44	Roc Nation
2018	"Grace"	Charles Jenkins & Fellowship Chicago feat. Kim Burrell	Grace: The Remixes – EP	Inspired People, LLC
2018	"Sunshine Feel Good"	Snoop Dogg & Kim Burrell	Snoop Dogg Presents Bible of Love	RCA Inspiration
2018	"Talk to God"	Mali Music & Kim Burrell	Snoop Dogg Presents Bible of Love	RCA Inspiration
2020	"Don't Let Go (feat. Kim Burrell)	PJ Morton & Kim Burrell	Gospel According To PJ	Morton Inspiration/Tyscot Records, LLC
2022	"Victory (Remix) feat. Kim Burrell"	Kenny Lewis & One Voice feat. Kim Burrell	Victory (Remix) feat. Kim Burrell	Broadcast Music Inc.
2022	"Anyway (Live)"	Zacardi Cortez feat. Pastor Kim Burrell	Imprint	Blacksmoke Music Worldwide
2022	"Anyhow Reprise"	Tye Tribbett feat. Kim Burrell, Jekalyn Carr, Isaac Carree, Zacardi Cortez, Tasha Page-Lockhart, and Isaiah Templeton	All Things New	Motown Gospel
2023	"Tap Into It (The Source)"	Renee Spearman feat. Kim Burrell	The Source	The Orchard Music
2024	"Call His Name"	Kenny Lewis & One Voice feat. Kim Burrell	Call His Name	PureSound Muzik Group
2025	"Makes My Day"	Cory Montell Scott & Kim Burrell	Makes My Day	CSMusic Productions, LLC

== Awards ==
=== Dove Awards ===
The Dove Awards are awarded annually by the Gospel Music Association. Burrell has received 1 award.

Year	Award	Nominated work	Result
2012	Urban Recorded Song of the Year	"Sweeter"	Won

=== Grammy Awards ===
The Grammy Awards are awarded annually by the National Academy of Recording Arts and Sciences. Burrell has received 3 nominations.

Year	Award	Nominated work	Result
2002	Best Contemporary Soul Gospel Album	Live In Concert	Nominated
2009	Best Gospel Performance	"I Understand"	Nominated
2012	Best Gospel Album	The Love Album	Nominated

=== Stellar Awards ===
The Stellar Awards are awarded annually by SAGMA. Burrell has received 3 awards and 1 honorary award.

Year	Award	Nominated work	Result
2000	Contemporary Female Vocalist of the Year	Everlasting Life	Won
2000	Contemporary CD of the Year	Everlasting Life	Nominated
2002	Urban/Inspirational Performance of the Year	Live in Concert	Nominated
2002	Female Vocalist of the Year	Live in Concert	Nominated
2002	Contemporary Female Vocalist of the Year	Live in Concert	Nominated
2010	Contemporary Female Vocalist of the Year	No Ways Tired	Nominated
2012	Contemporary Female Vocalist of the Year	The Love Album	Won
2012	Female Vocalist of the Year	The Love Album	Won
2021	Traditional Female Artist of the Year	Gospel According to PJ	Nominated
2024	Herself	Aretha Franklin Icon Award	Honored
2026	Song of the Year	"Able" (with Paul Sylvester Morton Jr.)	Nominated

=== Miscellaneous awards ===
Year	Organization	Award	Nominated work	Result	Ref.
2000	Funk Music Excellence Award	Female Vocalist of the Year – Contemporary	Everlasting Life	Won	
2002	Soul Train Music Awards	Best Gospel album	Live In Concert	Nominated	
2016	NAACP Image Awards	Outstanding Gospel Album – Traditional or Contemporary	A Different Place	Nominated	
2017	NAACP Image Awards	Outstanding Song, Traditional	"I See Victory" (with Pharrell)	Won	
