= Sunday Best (American TV series) =

American reality competition television series

- Sunday Best logo used from seasons 1-8
- Genre: Reality competition
- Presented by: Kirk Franklin
- Judges: Bebe Winans; CeCe Winans; Erica Campbell; Tina Campbell; Donnie McClurkin; Yolanda Adams; Kim Burrell; Kierra Sheard; Kelly Price; Jonathan McReynolds
- Country of origin: United States
- Original language: English
- No. of seasons: 10
- No. of episodes: 101

Production
- Producers: D'Angela Proctor; Steed and Nia T. Hill of Strange Fruit Media; Kirk Franklin; Erica and Tina Campbell; Torrence Glenn
- Running time: 60 minutes

Original release
- Network: BET
- Release: October 2, 2007 – August 30, 2015
- Release: June 30, 2019 – August 23, 2020

Sunday Best is a reality television singing competition series hosted by Kirk Franklin. It first aired on BET on October 2, 2007.

In each season, the show and its judges set out to find the best undiscovered gospel talent in the United States. Finalists competed each week until a winner was crowned. The judges throughout the series' run included Gospel singers Yolanda Adams, Kierra Sheard, Donnie McClurkin, Mary Mary, Bebe Winans & Cece Winans. Gospel singer Kim Burrell served as the on-screen mentor.

Each season's winner receives a national recording contract, a new automobile, and an undisclosed cash prize benefiting his or her community as well as the title of 'Sunday Best'.

On April 18, 2019, it was announced that the series would return for a ninth season, which premiered on June 30, 2019. Franklin returned as host and former Mary Mary member Erica Campbell also returning as a judge, with Kelly Price and Jonathan McReynolds joining as judges. Sunday Best was renewed by BET for a tenth season which premiered on July 5, 2020.

== Winners ==
Season	Winner	Debut album	Release date
Season 1	Crystal Aikin	Crystal Aikin	March 17, 2009
Season 2	Y'Anna Crawley	The Promise	August 24, 2010
Season 3	Le'Andria Johnson	Awakening of Le'Andria Johnson	September 6, 2011
Season 4	Amber Bullock	So In Love	July 10, 2012
Season 5	Joshua Rogers	Well Done	December 4, 2012
Season 6	Tasha Page-Lockhart	Here Right Now	August 5, 2014
Season 7	Geoffrey Golden	Kingdom...Live!	August 17, 2015
Season 8	Dathan Thigpen	GetUp Vol. 1 Get Exposed To Unadulterated Praise	January 1, 2016
Season 9	Melvin Crispell III	Prologue III	September 20, 2019
Season 10	Stephanie Summers	Mighty Strong God	October 22, 2021
