= Grammy Award for Best Gospel Performance/Song =

Grammy award category since 2015

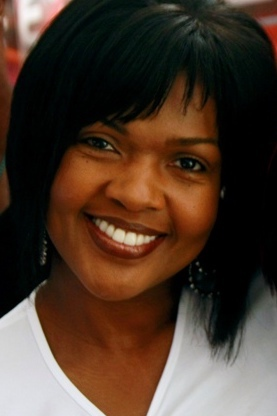
- "Come Jesus Come" by CeCe Winans (pictured) featuring Shirley Caesar is the most recent recipient
- Awarded for: quality vocal or instrumental Gospel performances and songwriting
- Country: United States
- Presented by: National Academy of Recording Arts and Sciences
- First award: 2015
- Currently held by: CeCe Winans ft Shirley Caesar - "Come Jesus Come" (2026)
- Website: grammy.com

The Grammy Award for Best Gospel Performance/Song is a category at the annual Grammy Awards. It was first awarded in 2015. It combines two previously separate categories in the Gospel/Contemporary Christian Music field, Best Gospel Song (for songwriters) and Best Gospel/Contemporary Christian Music Performance (for performers). The current category recognizes both songwriters and performers (solo/duos/groups/collaborations/etc.) and is open for singles or tracks only. Songwriters are only awarded a Grammy Award if it is a newly written song. Grammys for cover versions of previously recorded songs are awarded to the performer(s) only.

These changes were made in June 2014 by NARAS "in the interest of clarifying the criteria, representing the current culture and creative DNA of the gospel and Contemporary Christian Music communities, and better reflecting the diversity and authenticity of today's gospel music industry."

Along with its sister category Best Contemporary Christian Music Performance/Song, both are the only Grammy categories that award both performers and songwriters.

According to the Grammy committee, the move recognizes "the critical contribution of both songwriters and performers by combining songwriters and artists into the Best Gospel Performance/Song and Best Contemporary Christian Music Performance/Song categories." The category awards traditional Christian, roots gospel or contemporary gospel music.

Contemporary Christian Music performances, which were previously recognized in the Best Gospel/Contemporary Christian Music Performance category, now fall under the Best Contemporary Christian Music Performance/Song category only.

Kirk Franklin has won the most Grammy's in this category, six as of 2024. (If a winning artist is both the performer and the composer, they win just one Grammy).

== Recipients ==
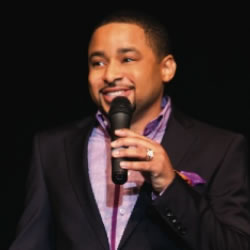
Smokie Norful was the first recipient of the award alongside Aaron W. Lindsey.

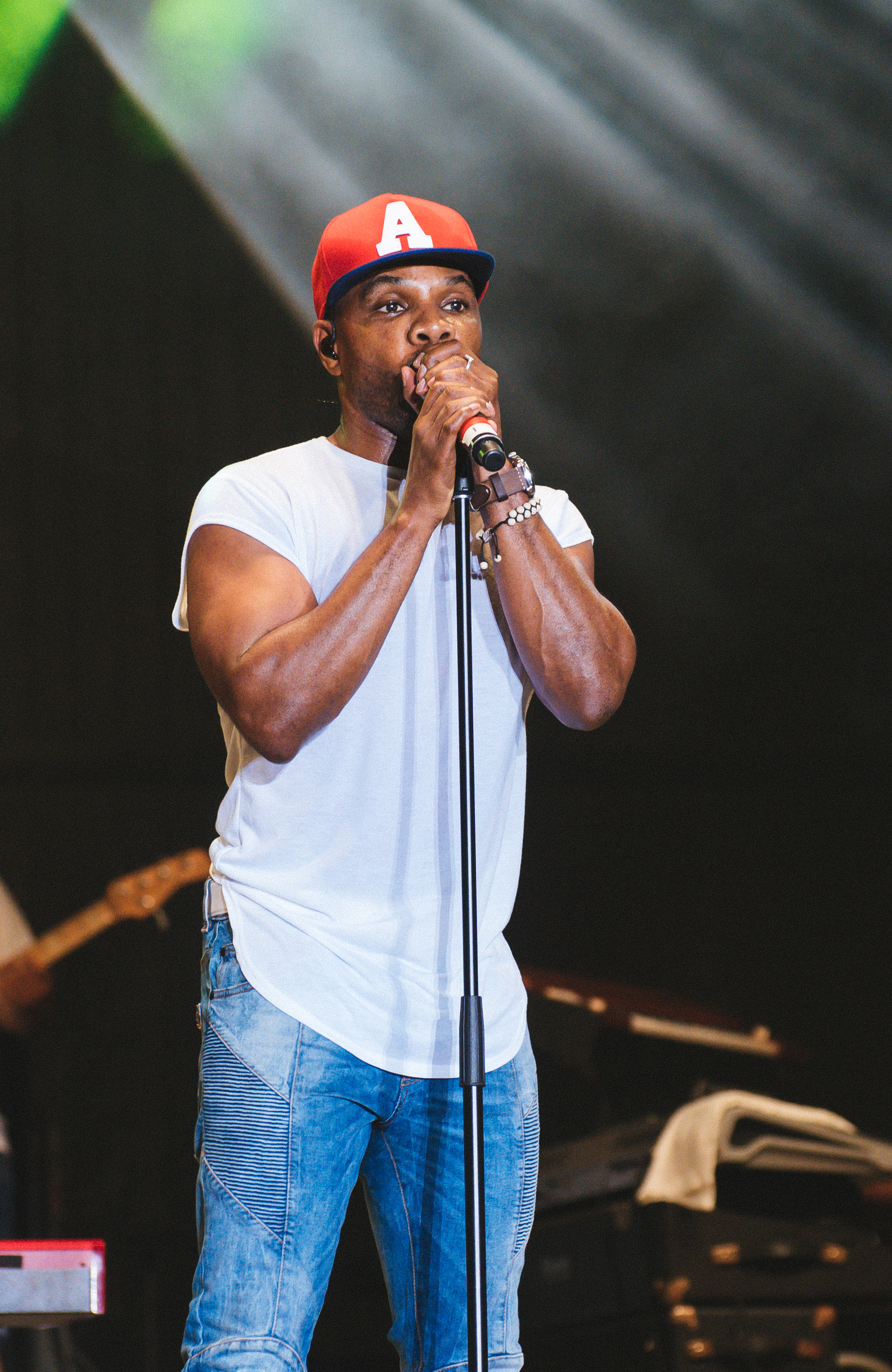
Six-time winner Kirk Franklin.

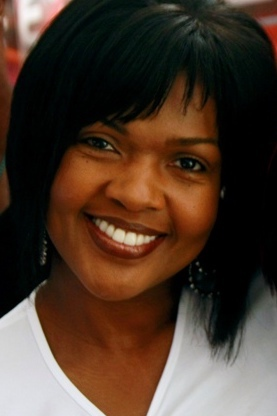
Two-time winner Cece Winans.

Year^{[I]}	Work	Performing artist(s)	Songwriter(s)	Nominees Songwriter(s) mentioned first, followed by title and performing artist(s). Songwriters are only eligible for an award if it is a new composition. If songwriters are non-eligible, their names are mentioned between parentheses.	Ref.
2015	"No Greater Love"	Smokie Norful	Aaron W. Lindsey & Smokie Norful	Erica Campbell, Warryn Campbell, Hasben Jones, Harold Lilly, Lecrae Moore & Aaron Sledge for "Help", performed by Erica Campbell featuring Lecrae; Rudy Currence & Donald Lawrence for "Sunday AM", performed by Karen Clark Sheard; Kortney J. Pollard for "I Believe", performed by Mali Music; Kirk Franklin for "Love on the Radio", performed by The Walls Group	
2016	"Wanna Be Happy?"	Kirk Franklin	Kirk Franklin	Anthony Brown for "Worth (Live)", performed by Anthony Brown and Group Therapy; Travis Greene for "Intentional", performed by Travis Greene; Neville Diedericks, Israel Houghton and Meleasa Houghton for "How Awesome Is Our God (Live)", performed by Israel & New Breed; Aaron Lindsey and Brian Courtney Wilson for "Worth Fighting For (Live)", performed by Brian Courtney Wilson	
2017	"God Provides"	Tamela Mann	Kirk Franklin	Stanley Brown & Courtney Rumble for "It's Alright, It's OK", performed by Shirley Caesar featuring Anthony Hamilton; Allundria Carr for "You're Bigger (Live)", performed by Jekalyn Carr; Travis Greene for "Made a Way (Live)", performed by Travis Greene; Jason Clayborn, Gabriel Hatcher & Hezekiah Walker for "Better", performed by Hezekiah Walker	
2018	"Never Have To Be Alone"	CeCe Winans	Dwan Hill & Alvin Love III	Tina Campbell & Warryn Campbell for "Too Hard Not To", performed by Tina Campbell; David Bloom, JJ Hairston, Phontane Demond Reed & Cortez Vaughn for "You Deserve It", performed by JJ Hairston & Youthful Praise featuring Bishop Cortez Vaughn; Le'Andria for "Better Days", performed by Le'Andria; Warryn Campbell, Eric Dawkins, Damien Farmer, Damon Thomas, Ahjah Walls & Darrel Walls for "My Life", performed by The Walls Group	
2019	"Never Alone"	Tori Kelly featuring Kirk Franklin	Kirk Franklin & Victoria Kelly	Jekalyn Carr & Allen Carr for "You Will Win", performed by Jekalyn Carr; Koryn Hawthorne for "Won't He Do It", performed by Koryn Hawthorne; Jonathan McReynolds for "Cycles", performed by Jonathan McReynolds featuring DOE; Aaron W. Lindsey, Alvin Richardson & Brian Courtney Wilson for "A Great Work", performed by Brian Courtney Wilson	
2020	"Love Theory"	Kirk Franklin	Kirk Franklin	Bryan Fowler, Gloria Gaynor & Chris Stevens for "Talkin' 'bout Jesus", performed by Gloria Gaynor & Yolanda Adams; Travis Greene for "See the Light", performed by Travis Greene featuring Jekalyn Carr; Aaron Lindsey & Bernie Herms for "Speak the Name", performed by Koryn Hawthorne featuring Natalie Grant; Tony Brown, Brandon Lake, Tasha Cobbs Leonard & Nate Moore for "This Is a Move (Live)", performed by Tasha Cobbs	
2021	"Movin' On"	Jonathan McReynolds & Mali Music	Darryl L. Howell, Jonathan Caleb McReynolds, Kortney Jamaal Pollard & Terrell Demetrius Wilson	Melvin Crispell III for "Wonderful Is Your Name", performed by Melvin Crispell III; David Frazier for "Release (Live)", performed by Ricky Dillard featuring Tiff Joy; LaShawn Daniels, Rodney Jerkins, Lecrae Moore & Jazz Nixon for "Come Together", performed by Rodney "Darkchild" Jerkins Presents: The Good News; Travis Greene for "Won't Let Go", performed by Travis Greene	
2022	Never Lost	CeCe Winans	Chris Brown, Steven Furtick & Tiffany Hammer	Dante Bowe, Tywan Mack, Jeff Schneeweis & Mitch Wong for "Voice of God", performed by Dante Bowe featuring Steffany Gretzinger & Chandler Moore; Dante Bowe & Ben Schofield for "Joyful", performed by Dante Bowe; Anthony Brown & Darryl Woodson for "Help", performed by Anthony Brown & Group Therapy; Dante Bowe, Chris Brown, Steven Furtick, Tiffany Hudson, Brandon Lake & Chandler Moore for "Wait On You", performed by Elevation Worship & Maverick City Music	
2023	Kingdom	Maverick City Music & Kirk Franklin	Kirk Franklin, Jonathan Jay, Chandler Moore & Jacob Poole	Erica Campbell, Warryn Campbell & Juan Winans for "Positive", performed by Erica Campbell; Dominique Jones & Dewitt Jones for "When I Pray", performed by DOE; PJ Morton for "The Better Benediction", performed by PJ Morton featuring Zacardi Cortez, Gene Moore, Samoht, Tim Rogers & Darrel Walls; Brandon Jones, Christopher Michael Stevens, Thaddaeus Tribbett & Tye Tribbett for "Get Up", performed by Tye Tribbett	
2024	"All Things"	Kirk Franklin	Kirk Franklin	Stanley Brown, Karen V. Clark Sheard, Kaylah Jiavanni Harvey, Rodney Jerkins, Elyse Victoria Johnson, J. Drew Sheard II, Kierra Valencia Sheard & Hezekiah Walker for "God is Good", performed by Stanley Brown featuring Hezekiah Walker, Kierra Sheard & Karen Clark Sheard; Erica Campbell, Warryn Campbell, William Weatherspoon, Juan Winans & Marvin L. Winans for "Feel Alright (Blessed)", performed by Erica Campbell; Marcus Calyen, Zacardi Cortez & Kerry Douglas for "Lord Do It For Me (Live)", performed by Zacardi Cortez; Robert Fryson for "God Is", performed by Melvin Crispell III	
2025	"One Hallelujah"	Tasha Cobbs Leonard, Erica Campbell & Israel Houghton featuring Jonathan McReynolds & Jekalyn Carr	Morris Coleman, Israel Houghton, Kenneth Leonard, Jr., Tasha Cobbs Leonard & Naomi Raine	Sir William James Baptist & Donald Lawrence for "Church Doors", performed by Yolanda Adams; Erica Atkins, Trecina Atkins & Warryn Campbell for "Yesterday", performed by Melvin Crispell III; Duane C. Shipley & Ricky Dillard for "Hold On (Live)", performed by Ricky Dillard; Jesse Paul Barrera, Jeffrey Castro Bernat, Dominique Jones, Timothy Ferguson, Kelby Shavon Johnson, Jr., Jonathan McReynolds, Rickey Slikk Muzik Offord & Juan Winans for "Holy Hands", performed by DOE	
2026	"Come Jesus Come"	Cece Winans featuring Shirley Caesar	—N/a	Kirk Franklin for "Do It Again", performed by Kirk Franklin; Anthony S. Brown, Brunes Charles, Annatoria Chitapa, Kenneth Leonard, Jr., Tasha Cobbs Leonard & Jonas Myrin for "Church", performed by Tasha Cobbs Leonard & John Legend; Britney Delagraentiss, Jonathan McReynolds, David Lamar Outing II, Orlando Joel Palmer & Terrell Demetrius Wilson for "Still (Live)", performed by Jonathan McReynolds & Jamal Roberts; Adia Andrews, Michael McClure Jr., David Lamar Outing II & Terrell Anthony Pettus for "Amen", performed by Pastor Mike Jr.	
2027	Winners TBA on 7 February 2027			Kirk Franklin for "Thank You For Everything", performed by Kirk Franklin & Karen Clark Sheard; Cory Henry for "Watches Over Me", performed by Cory Henry ft. Hezekiah Walker & the Brent Fischer Orchestra; "Promises 2.0", performed by Lisa Knowles-Smith & The Brown Singers; PJ Morton for "Mercy", performed by PJ Morton; "At the Cross", performed by CeCe Winans	

== See also ==
- Grammy Award for Best Gospel Song
- Grammy Award for Best Contemporary Christian Music Song
- Grammy Award for Best Contemporary Christian Music Performance/Song
