= Soul Train Music Award for Best Gospel/Inspirational Song =

Annual US music award

This page lists the winners and nominees for the Soul Train Music Award for Best Gospel/Inspirational Song. The award was originally entitled Best Gospel Performance – Male, Female or Group and was created during the 2009 ceremony. It was later retitled to Best Gospel/Inspirational Performance in 2013 and then to its current title in 2014. Mary Mary and Lecrae are the only artists to win this award twice.

== Winners and nominees ==
Winners are listed first and highlighted in bold.

=== 2000s ===
Year	Artist	Song	Ref
2009
2009	**Mary Mary**	**"God in Me"**	
2009	Fred Hammond (featuring John P Kee)	"They That Wait"	
2009	Smokie Norful	"Justified"	
2009	Marvin Sapp	"Praise Him in Advance"	
2009	BeBe & CeCe Winans	"Close to You"	

=== 2010s ===
Year	Artist	Song	Ref
2010
2010	**Marvin Sapp**	**N/A**	
2010	Lisa Page Brooks	—N/a	
2010	Fred Hammond	—N/a	
2010	Youthful Praise (featuring J.J. Hairston)	—N/a	
2010	Tye Tribbett	—N/a	
2010	Hezekiah Walker & LFC	—N/a	
2011
2011	**Mary Mary**	**"Walking"**	
2011	James Fortune (featuring Shawn McLemore)	"I Believe"	
2011	Kirk Franklin	"I Smile"	
2011	Trin-i-tee 5:7	"Heaven Hear My Heart"	
2011	CeCe Winans	"More"	
2012	—N/a		
2013
2013	**Tye Tribbett**	**"If He Did It Before (Same God)"**	
2013	Tasha Cobbs	"Break Every Chain"	
2013	LeCrae	"Confessions"	
2013	Hezekiah Walker	"Every Praise"	
2013	Shirley Caesar	"God Will Make a Way"	
2013	John P. Kee	"Life & Favor"	
2014
2014	**Erica Campbell (featuring Lecrae)**	**"Help"**	
2014	Inspired People (featuring Charles Jenkins)	"Real Love"	
2014	Tamela Mann	"I Can Only Imagine"	
2014	Donnie McClurkin (featuring Tye Tribbett)	"We Are Victorious"	
2014	Smokie Norful	"No Greater Love"	
2014	Michelle Williams (featuring Beyoncé and Kelly Rowland)	"Say Yes"	
2015
2015	**Lecrae**	**"All I Need is You"**	
2015	Erica Campbell	"More Love"	
2015	Fred Hammond and BreeAnn Hammond	"I Will Trust"	
2015	Kirk Franklin	"Wanna Be Happy?"	
2015	Marvin Sapp	"Yes You Can"	
2016
2016	**Kirk Franklin**	**"123 Victory"**	
2016	Travis Greene	"Made a Way"	
2016	Tamela Mann	"God Provides"	
2016	Donnie McClurkin	"I Need You"	
2016	Hezekiah Walker	"Better"	
2017
2017	**Lecrae**	**N/A**	
2017	Chance the Rapper	—N/a	
2017	Charlie Wilson	—N/a	
2017	Kirk Franklin	—N/a	
2017	Tamela Mann	—N/a	
2018
2018	**Lecrae**	N/A	
2018	Andra Day	—N/a	
2018	Kirk Franklin	—N/a	
2018	Snoop Dogg	—N/a	
2018	Tori Kelly	—N/a	
2019
2019	**Kirk Franklin**	N/A	
2019	BeBe Winans	—N/a	
2019	Donald Lawrence	—N/a	
2019	Erica Campbell	—N/a	
2019	Tasha Cobbs Leonard	—N/a	
2019	Tori Kelly	—N/a	

=== 2020s ===
Year	Artist	Song	Ref
2020
2020	**Kirk Franklin**	N/A	
2020	BeBe Winans	—N/a	
2020	Koryn Hawthorne	—N/a	
2020	Marvin Sapp	—N/a	
2020	PJ Morton	—N/a	
2020	The Clark Sisters	—N/a	
2021
2021	**Kirk Franklin**	N/A	
2021	Brian Courtney Wilson	—N/a	
2021	James Fortune	—N/a	
2021	Kelly Price	—N/a	
2021	Maverick City Music	—N/a	
2021	Tasha Cobbs Leonard	—N/a	
2022
2022	**Maverick City Music & Kirk Franklin**	N/A	
2022	CeCe Winans	—N/a	
2022	Erica Campbell	—N/a	
2022	Fred Hammond	—N/a	
2022	MAJOR.	—N/a	
2022	Marvin Sapp	—N/a	
2022	Tamela Mann	—N/a	
2022	Tasha Cobbs Leonard	—N/a	
2023
2023	**Kirk Franklin**	**"All Things"**	
2023	Shirley Caesar	"All the Glory"	
2023	Fridayy featuring Maverick City Music & My Mom	"Came Too Far"	
2023	Koryn Hawthorne	"Cry"	
2023	Erica Campbell	"Feel Alright (Blessed)"	
2023	Maverick City Music, Chandler Moore & Naomi Raine	"God Problems"	
2023	H.E.R.	"The Journey"	
2023	Kirk Franklin	"Try Love"	
