= Billboard Music Award for Top Gospel Song =

Annual American music award

The Billboard Music Award winners for Top Gospel Song:.

== Winners and nominees ==
Winners are listed first and highlighted in bold.

=== 2010s ===
Year	Song	Artist	Ref.
2016	**"Wanna Be Happy?"**	**Kirk Franklin**	
2016	"Worth"	Anthony Brown and group therAPy	
2016	"I Luh God"	Erica Campbell feat. Big Shizz	
2016	"Intentional"	Travis Greene	
2016	"Worth Fighting For"	Brian Courtney Wilson	
2017	**"Made a Way"**	**Travis Greene**	
2017	"Better"	Hezekiah Walker	
2017	"You're Bigger"	Jekalyn Carr	
2017	"Wanna Be Happy?"	Kirk Franklin	
2017	"Put a Prise On It"	Tasha Cobbs Leonard featuring Kierra Sheard	
2018	**"You Deserve It"**	**Youthful Praise**	
2018	"Trust in You"	Anthony Brown & Group TherAPy	
2018	"I'm Blessed"	Charlie Wilson	
2018	"Change Me"	Tamela Mann	
2018	"You Waited"	Travis Greene	
2019	**"Won't He Do It"**	**Koryn Hawthorne**	
2019	"Your Great Name"	Todd Dulaney	
2019	"Never Alone"	Tori Kelly ft. Kirk Franklin	
2019	"Forever"	Jason Nelson	
2019	"A Great Work"	Brian Courtney Wilson	

=== 2020s ===
Year	Song	Artist	Ref.
2020	**"Follow God"**	**Kanye West**	
2020	"Love Theory"	Kirk Franklin	
2020	"Closed on Sunday"	Kanye West	
2020	"On God"	Kanye West	
2020	"Selah"	Kanye West	
2021	**"Wash Us in the Blood"**	**Kanye West ft. Travis Scott**	
2021	"Speak To Me"	Koryn Hawthorne	
2021	"Movin' On"	Jonathan McReynolds & Mali Music	
2021	"Thank You For It All"	Marvin Sapp	
2021	"We Gon' Be Alright"	Tye Tribbett	
2022	**"Hurricane"**	**Ye**	
2022	"Jireh"	Elevation Worship & Maverick City Music ft. Chandler Moore & Naomi Raine	
2022	"Moon"	Ye	
2022	"Off the Grid"	Ye	
2022	"Praise God"	Ye	
2023	**"Goodness of God"**	**CeCe Winans**	
2023	"God Really Loves Us"	Crowder & Dante Bowe ft. Maverick City Music	
2023	"More Than Able"	Elevation Worship ft. Chandler Moore & Tiffany Hudson	
2023	"Fear is Not My Future"	Maverick City Music & Kirk Franklin ft. Brandon Lake & Chandler Moore	
2023	"Lord Do It For Me (Live in Memphis)"	Zacardi Cortez	
2024	**"That's My King"**	**CeCe Winans**	
2024	"Look At God"	Koryn Hawthorne	
2024	"God Problems"	Maverick City Music, Chandler Moore & Naomi Raine	
2024	"In the Room"	Maverick City Music, Chandler Moore & Naomi Raine ft. Tasha Cobbs Leonard	
2024	"This Year (Blessings)"	Victor Thompson x Gunna ft. Ehis 'D' Greatest	
