= Pastor Mike Jr. =

American contemporary gospel music artist, public speaker and pastor

- Also known as: Pastor Mike Jr.; PMJ
- Born: Michael DeWayne McClure Jr. August 15, 1983 (age 43); Birmingham, Alabama
- Genres: Gospel; worship; Christian contemporary; rap/hip-hop; R&B; contemporary gospel
- Occupations: Musician; singer; songwriter; producer; public speaker; pastor
- Years active: 2005–present
- Labels: Blacksmoke Music Worldwide; Rock City Media Group; Worldwide Music

Michael DeWayne McClure Jr. (born August 15, 1983, in Birmingham, Alabama), best known as Pastor Mike Jr., is a contemporary gospel singer, public speaker, and pastor from Birmingham, Alabama. He is the founder of Rock City Church. Billboard said that he is the first artist on the Gospel Airplay chart to have seven No. 1 songs which each appeared on four different charts.

He released his debut studio album, Live Free on September 20, 2019 through Blacksmoke Music Worldwide and Rock City Media Group. The album debuted at No. 6 on the Billboard Top Gospel Albums chart, and later reached No. 1. It was followed by I Got It: Singles Ministry, Vol 1, released on August 13, 2021, through Blacksmoke. His third studio album, Impossible, was released on February 3, 2023, through Worldwide Music, and went to No. 4 on the Top Gospel albums chart.

== Discography ==
=== Studio albums ===
Title	Details	Peak chart positions		
Title	Details	US	US Gospel	US Indie
Live Free	Released: September 20, 2019; Label: Blacksmoke Music Worldwide/Rock City Media Group; Formats: Digital download, streaming	— (Note: Live Free did not enter the Billboard 200, but peaked at No. 50 on the Billboard Top Album Sales)	1	17
I Got It: Singles Ministry, Vol. 1	Released: August 13, 2021; Label: Blacksmoke; Formats: Digital download, streaming	—	—	—
Impossible	Released: February 3, 2023; Label: Worldwide Music; Formats: Digital download, streaming	— (Note: Impossible did not enter the Billboard 200, but peaked at No. 63 on the Billboard Top Current Album Sales)	4	—

=== Mixtapes ===
Title	Details	Peak chart positions
Title	Details	US Gospel
Confetti and Conspiracies: The Amen Mixtape	Released: July 11, 2025; Label: Rock City; Formats: Digital download, streaming	5

=== EPs ===
Title	Details	Peak chart positions	
Title	Details	US	US Gospel
Big: Freedom Session	Released: July 17, 2020; Label: Blacksmoke Music Worldwide/Rock City Media Group; Formats: Digital download, streaming	—	—
Winning	Released: October 28, 2022; Label: Worldwide Music; Formats: Digital download, streaming	—	10
I Got Away	Released: April 19, 2024; Label: Rock City Media Group; Formats: Digital download, streaming	— (Note: I Got Away did not enter the Billboard 200, but peaked at No. 49 on the Billboard Top Current Album Sales)	5
God Showing Out	Released: June 6, 2025; Label: Rock City Media Group; Formats: Digital download, streaming	—	9
"—" denotes a recording that did not chart or was not released in that territory.

=== Singles ===
Title	Year	Peak chart positions					Album
Title	Year	US	US Gospel	US Gospel Air.	US Gospel Digital	US R&B Air	Album
"Take the City Back"	2014	—	—	—	—	—	Non-album singles
"Blessed"	2016	—	—	—	—	—	Non-album singles
"Release Your Power" (with The Sound of Rock)	2019	—	—	—	—	—	Non-album singles
"Big"	2019	—	3	1	7	—	Live Free Big: Freedom Session (EP)
"I Got It"	2020	—	3	1	7	17	Live Free Big: Freedom Session (EP) I Got It: Singles Ministry Vol. 1
"Big Rock City"	2020	—	—	—	—	—	Non-album single
"Grateful"	2021	—	—	—	—	—	I Got It: Singles Ministry Vol. 1
"I Remember"	2021	—	—	—	—	—	Non-album single
"Amazing" (Gnarles Barkley cover)	2021	—	11	1	3	—	Impossible
"This Christmas, Just Jesus"	2022	—	—	—	—	—	Winning (EP)
"Miracles" (with Kierra Sheard)	2022	—	8	1	6	—	All Yours
"Mr. McClure"	2023	—	—	—	—	—	Impossible
"Windows"	2023	—	10	1	—	21	Impossible
"Amen"	2025	— (Note: "Amen" did not enter the Billboard Hot 100, but peaked at No. 18 on the Billboard Digital Song Sales)	4	1	1	—	Confetti and Conspiracies: The Amen Mixtape
"Proof"	2025	—	10	—	3	—	Confetti and Conspiracies: The Amen Mixtape
"Just Jesus"	2025	—	—	—	4	—	Non-album single
"Break"	2025	—	—	—	—	—	Confetti and Conspiracies: The Amen Mixtape
"No Lie" (with Miles Minnick)	2025	—	—	—	—	—	Confetti and Conspiracies: The Amen Mixtape
"Blessed"	2025	—	8	—	2	—	Non-album singles
"He Can"	2026	— (Note: "He Can" did not enter the Billboard Hot 100, but peaked at No. 17 on the Billboard Digital Song Sales)	6	—	1	—	Non-album singles
"Sunday Morning" (with Tauren Wells)	2026	—	21	—	—	—	Breathe on It
"Suddenly"	2026	— (Note: "Suddenly" did not enter the Billboard Hot 100, but peaked at No. 10 on the Billboard Digital Song Sales)	5	9	—	—	Non-album single
"—" denotes a recording that did not chart or was not released in that territory.

=== Other charted songs ===
Title	Year	Peak chart positions			Album
Title	Year	US Gospel	US Gospel Air	US Gospel Digital	Album
"Winning"	2022	—	—	5	Impossible
"Impossible (with James Fortune)	2023	6	1	2	Impossible
"I Got Away"	2024	—	—	4	I Got Away
"Haha"	2024	—	—	2	I Got Away
"Bye" (with Adia)	2025	25	—	—	Confetti and Conspiracies: The Amen Mixtape
"God Showing Out"	2025	18	—	—	Confetti and Conspiracies: The Amen Mixtape
"Turn It Around"	2025	10	1	—	Confetti and Conspiracies: The Amen Mixtape
"—" denotes a recording that did not chart or was not released in that territory.

== Awards and certifications ==
=== Stellar Awards ===
Year	Nominee/work	Category	Result	Ref.
2020	Himself	New Artist of the Year	Won	
2020	"Big"	Urban / Inspirational Single or Performance of the Year	Nominated	
2020	Live Free	Rap Hip-hop Gospel Album of the Year	Won	
2021	Himself	Artist of the Year	Won	
2021	Himself	Male Artist of the Year	Nominated	
2021	Big: Freedom Sessions	Album of the Year	Nominated	
2021	Himself	Contemporary Male Artist of the Year	Nominated	
2021	Big: Freedom Sessions	Contemporary Album of the Year	Nominated	
2021	"I Got It"	Urban / Inspirational Single or Performance of the Year	Won	
2021	Big: Freedom Sessions	Rap Hip-hop Gospel Album of the Year	Won	
2022	Himself	Artist of the Year	Won	
2022	Himself	Male Artist of the Year	Won	
2022	I Got It: Singles Ministry Vol. 1	Album of the Year	Won	
2022	Himself	Contemporary Duo / Chorus of the Year	Won	
2022	Himself	Contemporary Male Artist of the Year	Won	
2022	I Got It: Singles Ministry Vol. 1	Contemporary Album of the Year	Won	
2022	"Amazing"	Urban / Inspirational Single or Performance of the Year	Won	
2023	Himself	Artist of the Year	Won	
2023	"Impossible"	Song of the Year	Nominated	
2023	"Big"	Song of the Year	Won	
2023	Himself	Male Artist of the Year	Won	
2023	Winning	Album of the Year	Won	
2023	Himself	Contemporary Male Artist of the Year	Won	
2023	Winning	Contemporary Album of the Year	Won	
2023	"Impossible"	Urban / Inspirational Single or Performance of the Year	Nominated	
2023	"Blak Sheep"	Rap/Hip-hop Song of the Year	Won	
2024	Himself	Artist of the Year	Won	
2024	Himself	Male Artist of the Year	Won	
2024	Impossible	Album of the Year	Won	
2024	Himself	Producer of the Year	Won	
2024	Himself	Contemporary Male Artist of the Year	Won	
2024	Impossible	Contemporary Album of the Year	Won	
2025	Himself	Artist of the Year	Won	
2025	Himself	Male Artist of the Year	Won	
2025	"Amen"	Song of the Year	Won	
2025	I Got Away EP	Album of the Year	Won	
2025	Himself	Producer of the Year	Won	
2025	Himself	Contemporary Male Artist of the Year	Won	
2025	"Amen"	Urban / Inspirational Single or Performance of the Year	Won	
2025	"Amen"	Music Video of the Year	Won	
2025	"Amen"	Rap/Hip-hop Song of the Year	Won	
2026	"On the Way" (performed by Adia Andrews and Erica Campbell; credited as writer)	Song of the Year	Pending	
2026	"On the Way" (performed by Adia Andrews and Erica Campbell; credited as writer)	Music Video of the Year	Pending	
2026	"On the Way" (performed by Adia Andrews and Erica Campbell; credited as writer)	Urban Single or Performance of the Year	Pending	
2026	Himself	Thomas A. Dorsey Notable Achievement Award	Won	

=== GMA Dove Awards ===
Year	Nominee/work	Category	Result	Ref.
2021	"I Got It"	Contemporary Gospel Recorded Song of the Year	Nominated	
2023	"Impossible"	Gospel Worship Recorded Song of the Year	Won	
2023	"Miracles"	Contemporary Gospel Recorded Song of the Year	Nominated	
2023	Impossible	Contemporary Gospel Album of the Year	Nominated	
2025	"Amen"	Contemporary Gospel Recorded Song of the Year	Nominated	
2026	"Sunday Morning"	Contemporary Gospel Recorded Song of the Year	Pending	
2026	Confetti and Conspiracies: The Amen Mixtape	Contemporary Gospel Album of the Year	Pending	

=== BET Awards ===
Year	Nominee/work	Category	Result	Ref.
2025	"Amen"	Dr. Bobby Jones Best Gospel/Inspirational Award	Nominated	

=== Grammy Awards ===
Year	Nominee/work	Category	Result	Ref.
2026	"Amen"	Best Gospel Performance/Song	Nominated	
