= Darrel Walls =

American gospel singer

- Born: Houston, Texas, U.S.
- Genres: Gospel, urban contemporary gospel
- Occupations: Singer; songwriter
- Years active: 2009–present
- Labels: Tyscot; Gumbo Studios
- Member of: The Walls Group

Darrel Walls is an American gospel singer and songwriter from Houston, Texas. He rose to prominence as the lead vocalist of The Walls Group, a quartet of four siblings, and later recorded as a solo artist. His debut solo release, Heart of Mine, made with PJ Morton, won the Grammy Award for Best Gospel Album at the 68th Annual Grammy Awards in 2026.

== Early life and The Walls Group ==
Walls was born in Houston. He has said that relatives on both sides of his family were musicians and that his childhood was shaped by that environment.

In 2009, he began performing with his siblings Rhea, Paco and Ahjah as The Walls Group; the quartet went on to release five albums and to receive three Grammy nominations. Walls sang lead and served as the group's principal songwriter. The group reached a wider audience in the early 2010s after signing to Kirk Franklin's Fo Yo Soul Recordings, and its 2014 album Fast Forward brought a Grammy nomination.

The group's Grammy nominations came in 2015 for "Love on the Radio", recorded with Franklin; in 2018 for "My Life"; and in 2019 for the album The Other Side. Walls also recorded with PJ Morton, appearing on "So in Love" and on "The Better Benediction", the latter nominated for Best Gospel Performance/Song in 2023.

== Solo career ==
=== Heart of Mine ===
By the time the project began, Walls had largely withdrawn from the music industry and was studying for a real estate licence. He has said that a telephone call from Morton, followed by a trip to Louisiana that Morton arranged, led him back to recording. The sessions lasted four days and took place at Studio in the Country. According to GospelFlava, the record originated as Morton's idea to build an album around Walls' voice.

Heart of Mine, a seven-track EP, was issued in the summer of 2025 by Tyscot Records in a joint venture with Morton's Gumbo Studios, with Morton, a member of Maroon 5, as producer. The Houston Chronicle reported that it formed the second release in a Morton-led series pairing him with newer artists in hip hop, R&B and gospel.

Nominations were announced in November 2025: the EP for Best Gospel Album, and its track "Amazing", written by Morton and Walls, for Best Contemporary Christian Music Performance/Song.

At the 68th Annual Grammy Awards, held on February 1, 2026, Heart of Mine won Best Gospel Album. It was Walls' first win, following six nominations across his career. Accepting the award alongside Morton, he said "To God be the glory". The contemporary Christian category was won by "Hard Fought Hallelujah", recorded by Brandon Lake with Jelly Roll.

=== Stellar Awards and later releases ===
At the 41st Stellar Gospel Music Awards, taped on August 15, 2026, at Spectrum Center in Charlotte, North Carolina and hosted by Kirk Franklin, Walls won Artist of the Year and Contemporary Male Artist of the Year, both for Heart of Mine.

The album track "Able" was reworked as a remix featuring Kim Burrell, a Houston singer whom Walls has described as a longstanding friend of his family. In 2026 he released the single "Good to Me", which draws on Afrobeats. He has said that he intends to record an album of orchestral material that would not be limited to gospel.

== Awards and nominations ==
=== Grammy Awards ===
Year	Nominated work	Category	Result
2015	"Love on the Radio" (with Kirk Franklin, as part of The Walls Group)	Best Gospel Performance/Song	Nominated
2018	"My Life" (as part of The Walls Group)	Best Gospel Performance/Song	Nominated
2019	The Other Side (as part of The Walls Group)	Best Gospel Album	Nominated
2023	"The Better Benediction" (with PJ Morton and others)	Best Gospel Performance/Song	Nominated
2026	Heart of Mine (with PJ Morton)	Best Gospel Album	Won
2026	"Amazing" (with PJ Morton)	Best Contemporary Christian Music Performance/Song	Nominated

=== Stellar Awards ===
Year	Nominated work	Category	Result
2026	Heart of Mine	Artist of the Year	Won
2026	Heart of Mine	Contemporary Male Artist of the Year	Won
