= 2016 Billboard Music Awards =

Annual American music awards ceremony

- Date: May 22, 2016
- Location: T-Mobile Arena, Las Vegas, Nevada, United States
- Hosted by: Ludacris; Ciara

Highlights
- Most wins: The Weeknd (8)
- Most nominations: The Weeknd (20)

Television/radio coverage
- Network: ABC
- Runtime: 128 minutes
- Viewership: 9.76 million

The 2016 Billboard Music Awards ceremony was held on May 22, 2016, at the T-Mobile Arena in Las Vegas, Nevada, the first nationally televised event to originate from that venue. It aired live on ABC with hosts Ludacris and Ciara.

The nominees were announced on April 11, 2016, with The Weeknd earning the most nominations with twenty. Britney Spears received the Billboard Millennium Award for her achievements and influence in the music industry. Celine Dion received the Billboard Icon Award in recognition of her career spanning over three decades. Madonna made an appearance to pay tribute to Prince. Adele premiered the music video for her single "Send My Love (To Your New Lover)" at the ceremony.

== Performances ==
Artist(s)	Song(s)	Presented by
Britney Spears	Medley: "Work Bitch" "Womanizer" "I Love Rock 'n' Roll" "Breathe on Me" "I'm a Slave 4 U" "Touch of My Hand" "Toxic"	—N/a
Shawn Mendes	"Stitches"	Jojo Fletcher
Fifth Harmony; Ty Dolla Sign	"Work from Home"	Ludacris; Ciara
Meghan Trainor	"No"	Serayah; Priyanka Chopra
Justin Bieber	"Company" "Sorry"	DJ Khaled
Pink	"Just Like Fire"	Mila Kunis; Kristen Bell; Kathryn Hahn
Nick Jonas; Tove Lo	"Close"	Ludacris
Demi Lovato	"Cool for the Summer"	Ludacris
Lukas Graham	"7 Years"	Ciara
Blake Shelton; Gwen Stefani	"Go Ahead and Break My Heart"	Thomas Rhett; Pete Wentz
DNCE	"Cake by the Ocean"	Keke Palmer; Kelly Rowland
Kesha; Ben Folds	"It Ain't Me, Babe"	Ludacris; Ciara
Rihanna	"Love on the Brain"	Lindsey Vonn; Laverne Cox
Celine Dion; Lindsey Stirling	"The Show Must Go On"	Seal
Troye Sivan	"Youth"	Halsey; Lucy Hale
The Go-Go's	"We Got the Beat"	Rebecca Romijn
Ariana Grande	"Dangerous Woman" "Into You"	Ludacris; Ciara
Madonna; Stevie Wonder	Tribute to Prince: "Nothing Compares 2 U" (Madonna solo) "Purple Rain"	Questlove

== Presenters ==
- Jessica Alba
- Ashton Kutcher
- Idina Menzel
- Kristen Bell
- Betty Cantrell
- DJ Khaled
- Kathryn Hahn
- Wiz Khalifa
- Laverne Cox
- Mila Kunis
- Keke Palmer
- Kelly Rowland
- Rebecca Romijn
- Serayah McNeill
- Seal
- Steven Tyler
- Lindsey Vonn
- Pete Wentz
- Priyanka Chopra
- Mark Cuban
- Halsey
- Zendaya
- Questlove
- Thomas Rhett
- JoJo Fletcher
- Heidi Klum
- Michael Strahan

== Winners and nominees ==
Winners are listed first and in bold.

Top Artist	Top New Artist
**Adele**; Justin Bieber; Drake; Taylor Swift; The Weeknd	**Fetty Wap**; OMI; Charlie Puth; Silentó; Bryson Tiller
Top Male Artist	Top Female Artist
**Justin Bieber**; Drake; Fetty Wap; Ed Sheeran; The Weeknd	**Adele**; Selena Gomez; Ariana Grande; Rihanna; Taylor Swift
Top Duo/Group	Top Touring Artist
**One Direction**; Maroon 5; The Rolling Stones; twenty one pilots; U2	**Taylor Swift**; Madonna; One Direction; The Rolling Stones; U2
Top Billboard 200 Artist	Top Billboard 200 Album
**Adele**; Justin Bieber; Drake; Taylor Swift; The Weeknd	**25 – Adele**; Purpose – Justin Bieber; x – Ed Sheeran; 1989 – Taylor Swift; Beauty Behind the Madness – The Weeknd
Top Hot 100 Artist	Top Hot 100 Song
**The Weeknd**; Justin Bieber; Drake; Fetty Wap; Taylor Swift	"**See You Again" – Wiz Khalifa feat. Charlie Puth**; "Hello" – Adele; "Trap Queen" – Fetty Wap; "Can't Feel My Face" – The Weeknd; "The Hills" – The Weeknd
Top Song Sales Artist	Top Selling Song
**The Weeknd**; Adele; Justin Bieber; Drake; Fetty Wap	**"Hello" – Adele**; "See You Again" – Wiz Khalifa feat. Charlie Puth; "The Hills" – The Weeknd; "Cheerleader" – OMI; "Fight Song" – Rachel Platten
Top Radio Songs Artist	Top Radio Song
**The Weeknd**; Justin Bieber; Ellie Goulding; Ed Sheeran; Taylor Swift	**"Shut Up and Dance" – WALK THE MOON**; "Hello" – Adele; "See You Again" – Wiz Khalifa feat. Charlie Puth; "Uptown Funk" – Mark Ronson feat. Bruno Mars; "Can't Feel My Face" – The Weeknd
Top Social Artist (fan-voted)	Top Streaming Artist
**Justin Bieber**; Selena Gomez; Ariana Grande; Demi Lovato; Taylor Swift	**The Weeknd**; Justin Bieber; Drake; Fetty Wap; Silentó
Top Streaming Song (Audio)	Top Streaming Song (Video)
**"The Hills" – The Weeknd**; "Sorry" – Justin Bieber; "What Do You Mean?" – Justin Bieber; "Hotline Bling – Drake; "Trap Queen" – Fetty Wap	**"Watch Me (Whip/Nae Nae)" – Silentó**; "Trap Queen" – Fetty Wap; "See You Again" – Wiz Khalifa feat. Charlie Puth; "Uptown Funk" – Mark Ronson feat. Bruno Mars; "The Hills" – The Weeknd
Top Christian Artist	Top Christian Song
**Hillsong UNITED**; Casting Crowns; Lauren Daigle; MercyMe; Chris Tomlin	**"Oceans (Where Feet May Fail)" – Hillsong UNITED**; "Touch the Sky" – Hillsong UNITED; "Flawless" – MercyMe; "Brother" – NEEDTOBREATHE feat. Gavin DeGraw; "Good Good Father" – Chris Tomlin
Top Christian Album	Top Gospel Artist
**How Can It Be – Lauren Daigle**; Empires – Hillsong UNITED; Hymns That Are Important to Us – Joey + Rory; This Is Not a Test – TobyMac; Adore: Christmas Songs of Worship – Chris Tomlin	**Kirk Franklin**; Anthony Brown and group therAPy; Tasha Cobbs; Travis Greene; Marvin Sapp
Top Gospel Song	Top Gospel Album
**"Wanna Be Happy" – Kirk Franklin**; "Worth" – Anthony Brown and group therAPy; "I Luh God" – Erica Campbell feat. Big Shizz; "Intentional" – Travis Greene; "Worth Fighting For" – Brian Courtney Wilson	**Losing My Religion – Kirk Franklin**; Everyday Jesus – Anthony Brown and group therAPy; One Place Live – Tasha Cobbs; Life Music: Stage Two – Jonathan McReynolds; You Shall Live – Marvin Sapp
Top Country Artist	Top Country Song
**Luke Bryan**; Sam Hunt; Chris Stapleton; Carrie Underwood; Zac Brown Band	**"Die a Happy Man" – Thomas Rhett**; "Break Up in a Small Town" – Sam Hunt; "Take Your Time" – Sam Hunt; "Girl Crush" – Little Big Town; "I'm Comin' Over" – Chris Young
Top Country Album	Top Dance/Electronic Artist
**Traveller – Chris Stapleton**; Kill the Lights – Luke Bryan; Montevallo – Sam Hunt; Storyteller – Carrie Underwood; Jekyll + Hyde – Zac Brown Band	**David Guetta**; The Chainsmokers; DJ Snake; Major Lazer; Zedd
Top Dance/Electronic Song	Top Dance/Electronic Album
**"Lean On" – Major Lazer & DJ Snake feat. MØ**; "Roses" – The Chainsmokers feat. Rozes; "You Know You Like It" – DJ Snake and AlunaGeorge; "Hey Mama" – David Guetta feat. Nicki Minaj, Bebe Rexha & Afrojack; "Where Are Ü Now" – Jack Ü with Justin Bieber	**True Colors – Zedd**; Listen – David Guetta; Peace Is the Mission – Major Lazer; In Return – ODESZA; Skrillex and Diplo Present Jack Ü – Jack Ü
Top Latin Artist	Top Latin Song
**Romeo Santos**; Banda Sinaloense MS de Sergio Lizárraga; Juan Gabriel; Nicky Jam; Ariel Camacho y Los Plebes del Rancho	**"El Perdón" – Nicky Jam & Enrique Iglesias**; "Ginza" – J Balvin; "Te Metiste" – Ariel Camacho y Los Plebes del Rancho; "Borró Cassette" – Maluma; "Propuesta Indecente" – Romeo Santos
Top Latin Album	Top R&B Artist
**Los Dúo – Juan Gabriel**; Mis Número 1...40 Aniversario – Juan Gabriel; Cama Incendiada – Maná; Hoy Más Fuerte – Gerardo Ortíz; Formula, Vol. 2 – Romeo Santos	**The Weeknd**; Chris Brown; Jeremih; Rihanna; Bryson Tiller
Top R&B Song	Top R&B Album
**"The Hills" – The Weeknd**; "Here" – Alessia Cara; "Post to Be" – Omarion feat. Chris Brown and Jhené Aiko; "Can't Feel My Face" – The Weeknd; "Earned It" – The Weeknd	**Beauty Behind the Madness – The Weeknd**; Royalty – Chris Brown; Anti – Rihanna; T R A P S O U L – Bryson Tiller; Black Rose – Tyrese
Top Rap Artist	Top Rap Song
**Drake**; Fetty Wap; Future; Wiz Khalifa; Silentó	**"See You Again" – Wiz Khalifa feat. Charlie Puth**; "Hotline Bling" – Drake; "Trap Queen" – Fetty Wap; "679" – Fetty Wap feat. Remy Boyz; "Watch Me (Whip/Nae Nae)" – Silentó
Top Rap Album	Top Rock Artist
**Dreams Worth More Than Money – Meek Mill**; If You're Reading This It's Too Late – Drake; What a Time to Be Alive – Drake & Future; Compton – Dr. Dre; To Pimp a Butterfly – Kendrick Lamar	**twenty one pilots**; Fall Out Boy; Elle King; WALK THE MOON; X Ambassadors
Top Rock Song	Top Rock Album
**"Shut Up and Dance" – WALK THE MOON**; "Uma Thurman" – Fall Out Boy; "Ex's & Oh's" – Elle King; "Stressed Out" – twenty one pilots; "Renegades" – X Ambassadors	**Blurryface – twenty one pilots**; Sound & Color – Alabama Shakes; Blackstar – David Bowie; A Head Full of Dreams – Coldplay; Wilder Mind – Mumford & Sons
Top Soundtrack	Billboard Chart Achievement (fan-voted)
**Pitch Perfect 2**; Empire: Original Soundtrack from Season 1; Fifty Shades of Grey: Original Motion Picture Soundtrack; Furious 7; Guardians of the Galaxy: Awesome Mix Vol.1	**Rihanna**; Adele; Drake; Little Big Town; The Weeknd
Icon Award	Millennium Award
Celine Dion	Britney Spears

=== Artists with multiple wins and nominations ===
Artists that received multiple nominations
Nominations	Artist
20	The Weeknd
12	Justin Bieber
12	Drake
11	Fetty Wap
9	Adele
8	Taylor Swift
6	Wiz Khalifa
6	Charlie Puth
5	Silentó
4	Hillsong UNITED
4	Sam Hunt
4	twenty one pilots
3	Anthony Brown and group therAPy
3	Chris Brown
3	Luke Bryan
3	DJ Snake
3	Kirk Franklin
3	Juan Gabriel
3	David Guetta
3	Major Lazer
3	Rihanna
3	Romeo Santos
3	Ed Sheeran
3	Bryson Tiller
3	WALK THE MOON
2	The Chainsmokers
2	Tasha Cobbs
2	Lauren Daigle
2	Fall Out Boy
2	Future
2	Selena Gomez
2	Ariana Grande
2	Travis Greene
2	Jack Ü
2	Nicky Jam
2	Elle King
2	Little Big Town
2	Ariel Camacho y Los Plebes del Rancho
2	Bruno Mars
2	MercyMe
2	One Direction
2	OMI
2	The Rolling Stones
2	Mark Ronson
2	Marvin Sapp
2	Chris Stapleton
2	Chris Tomlin
2	U2
2	Carrie Underwood
2	X Ambassadors
2	Zac Brown Band
2	Zedd

Artists that received multiple awards
Wins	Artist
8	The Weeknd
5	Adele
3	Kirk Franklin
2	Justin Bieber
2	Hillsong UNITED
2	Wiz Khalifa
2	Charlie Puth
2	twenty one pilots
2	WALK THE MOON
