= Amen (Pastor Mike Jr. song) =

2025 single by Pastor Mike Jr.

Single by Pastor Mike Jr

from the album Confetti and Conspiracies: The Amen Mixtape
- Released: January 10, 2025
- Genre: Gospel
- Length: 3:14
- Label: Rock City Media Group
- Songwriters: Adia Andrews; David Lamar Outing II; Michael McClure Jr.; Terrell Anthony Pettus
- Producers: David Lamar Outing II; Mr. Wilson On The Beat; Zavier

Pastor Mike Jr singles chronology
"Windows" (2023)	"Amen" (2025)	"Proof" (2025)

Music video
- "Amen" on YouTube

"Amen" is a song by American gospel musician Pastor Mike Jr. released on January 10, 2025, through Rock City Media Group. The song was released as the lead single from his extended play God Showing Out and his mixtape Confetti and Conspiracies: The Amen Mixtape. The song topped the Billboard Gospel Airplay chart, and reached No. 4 on the Hot Gospel Songs chart.

On January 31, 2025, an official music video was released.

== Writing and production ==
"Amen" is written in the key of F, with a speed of 85 beats per minute and a key signature of 4/4. It is 3 minutes and 14 seconds in length. The song was written and composed by Adia Andrews, David Lamar Outing II, Michael McClure Jr, and Terrel Anthony Pettus. Outing produced the song alongside Mr. Wilson On The Beat and Zavier. In an interview with Get Up! Mornings with Erica Campbell, Pastor Mike Jr. said of the song,

So many people are telling you what you can’t do, what you’re not, and what you won’t be able to accomplish. God gave me a song full of positive confessions: This (is) gonna be my year. I’m coming out. I’m blessed. Amen. I was in church, and it just hit me: Amen. I was in the parking lot of West Angeles on tour, humming it, saying, ‘This (is) gonna be the year that I break every cycle.'

Essence reviewed the song saying that it is a "powerful gospel anthem" which "uplifts the spirit". The song's theme is overcoming adversity and recognizing inherent self worth. Its genre is gospel music.

== Accolades ==
At the 2025 BET Awards, "Amen" was nominated for the Dr. Bobby Jones Best Gospel/Inspirational Award. At the 2025 Stellar Gospel Music Awards, the song was nominated for four awards, including Song of the Year, Urban Single or Performance of the Year, Music Video of the Year, and Rap/Hip-hop Song of the Year.

Year	Organization	Category	Result	Ref.
2025	BET Awards	Dr. Bobby Jones Best Gospel/Inspirational Award	Nominated	
2025	Stellar Gospel Music Awards	Song of the Year	Won	
2025	Stellar Gospel Music Awards	Urban Single or Performance of the Year	Won	
2025	Stellar Gospel Music Awards	Music Video of the Year	Won	
2025	Stellar Gospel Music Awards	Rap/Hip-hop Song of the Year	Won	
2025	GMA Dove Awards	Contemporary Gospel Recorded Song of the Year	Nominated	
2026	Grammy Awards	Best Gospel Performance/Song	Nominated	

== Chart performance ==
During its first week on the charts, the song debuted at its peak position of No. 4 on the Billboard Hot Gospel Songs, No. 1 on the Gospel Digital Song Sales, and No. 18 on the Digital Song Sales. After a No. 29 debut on the Gospel Airplay, the song later went to No. 1 on the chart. "Amen" marked Pastor Mike Jr's seventh consecutive Gospel Airplay No. 1 song becoming the longest running streak of Gospel Airplay No. 1 hits. The song was also his first song to be No. 1 on the Gospel Digital Song Sales and his first song appearing on an all-genre Billboard chart.

== Personnel ==
Adapted from Tidal.

- Adia Andrews – writer, composer
- David Lamar Outing II – writer, composer, producer
- Michael McClure Jr. – writer, composer
- Mr. Wilson on the Beat – producer
- Terrell Anthony Pettus – writer, composer
- Zavier – producer

== Charts ==
=== Weekly ===
Weekly chart performance for "Amen"
Chart (2025)	Peak position
US Digital Song Sales (Billboard)	18
US Gospel Airplay (Billboard)	1
US Hot Gospel Songs (Billboard)	4

=== Year-end ===
Year-end chart performance for "Amen"
Chart (2025)	Position
US Gospel Airplay (Billboard)	7
US Hot Gospel Songs (Billboard)	5
