= Grammy Award for Best Gospel Album =

American recorded music award

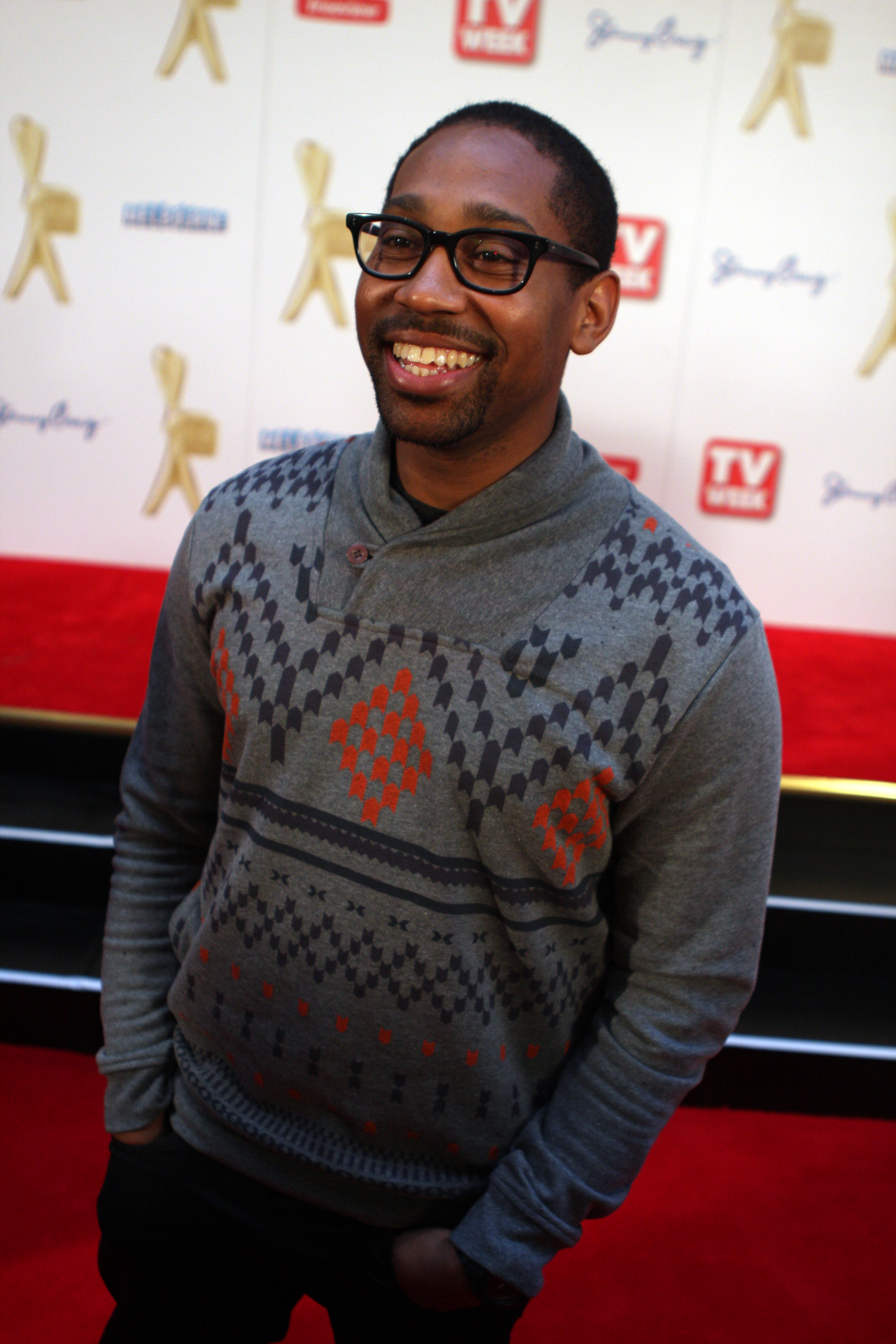
- Heart of Mine by Darrel Walls & PJ Morton (pictured) is the current recipient.
- Awarded for: Quality gospel albums
- Country: United States
- Presented by: National Academy of Recording Arts and Sciences
- First award: 2012
- Currently held by: Darrel Walls & PJ Morton – Heart of Mine (2026)
- Website: grammy.com

The Grammy Award for Best Gospel Album is an honor presented at the Grammy Awards, a ceremony that was established in 1958 and originally called the Gramophone Awards, to recording artists for quality albums in the Gospel music genre. Honors in several categories are presented at the ceremony annually by the National Academy of Recording Arts and Sciences of the United States to "honor artistic achievement, technical proficiency and overall excellence in the recording industry, without regard to album sales or chart position".

The Best Gospel Album award was one of the new categories created after a major overhaul of the Grammy Awards categories for 2012. This award combines recordings that were previously submitted for the Best Contemporary R&B Gospel Album, Best Rock or Rap Gospel Album and Best Traditional Gospel Album.

The Recording Academy decided to make a distinction between Contemporary Christian Music (CCM) and Gospel music after determining that there were "two distinct wings to the gospel house: Contemporary Christian Music (CCM) and Urban or Soul Gospel. Additionally, it was determined that the word "Gospel" tends to conjure up the images and sounds of traditional soul gospel and not CCM. With this in mind, it was decided not only to rename each of the categories, but also the entire [genre] field. [It] was determined that album and songwriting categories are of highest importance; Gospel and CCM each now have one category for each". As a result, the previous gospel album categories were combined into Best Gospel Album (for traditional or contemporary/R&B gospel music) and Best Contemporary Christian Music Album.

== Recipients ==
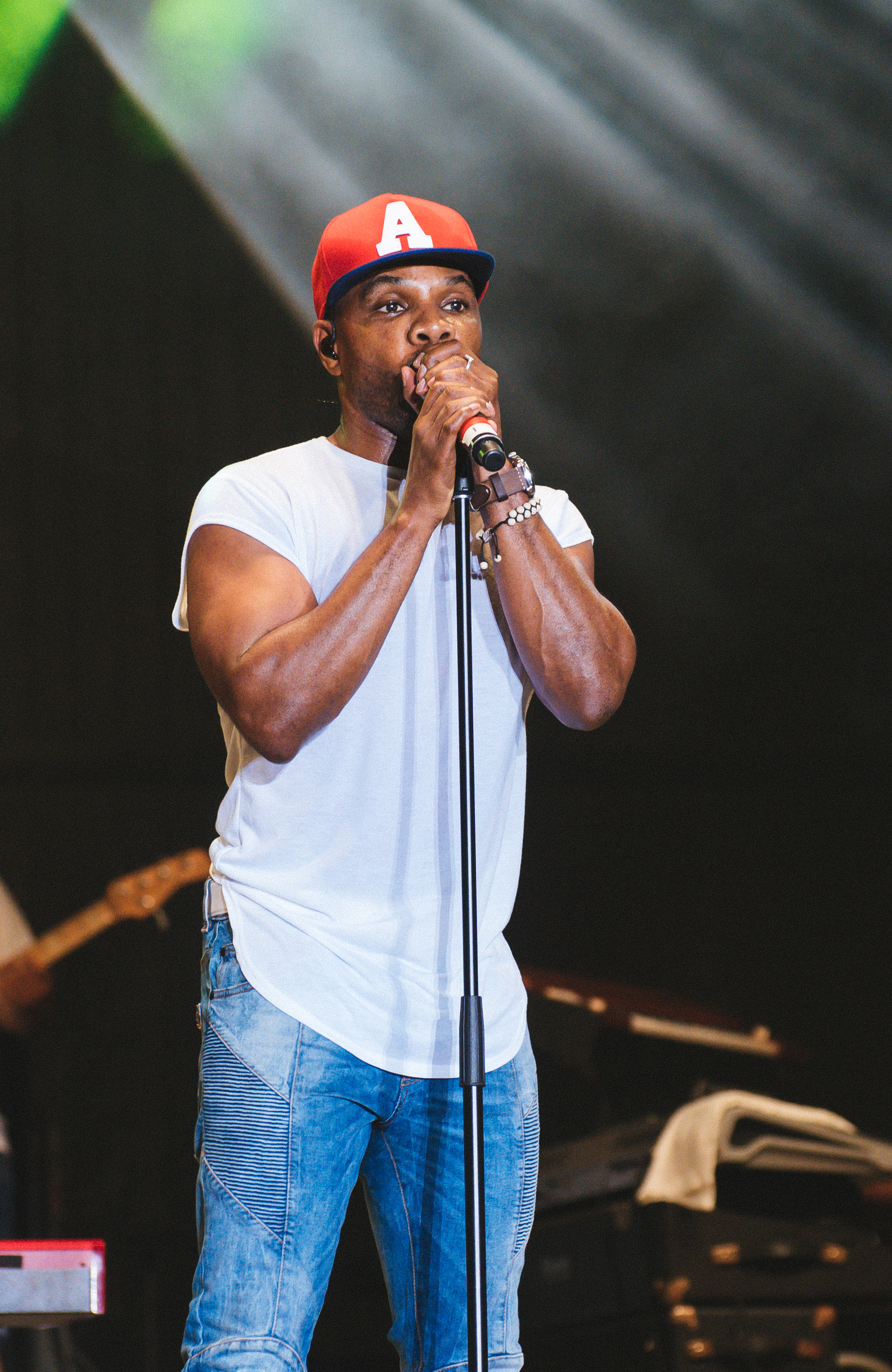
Four-time winner Kirk Franklin.

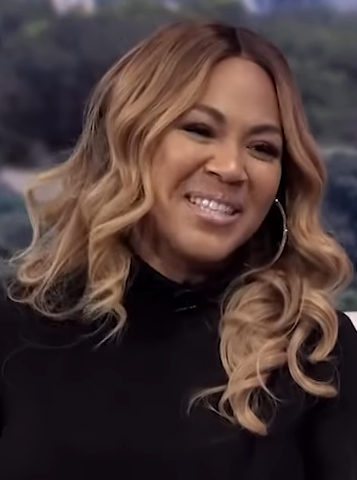
2015 winner Erica Campbell.

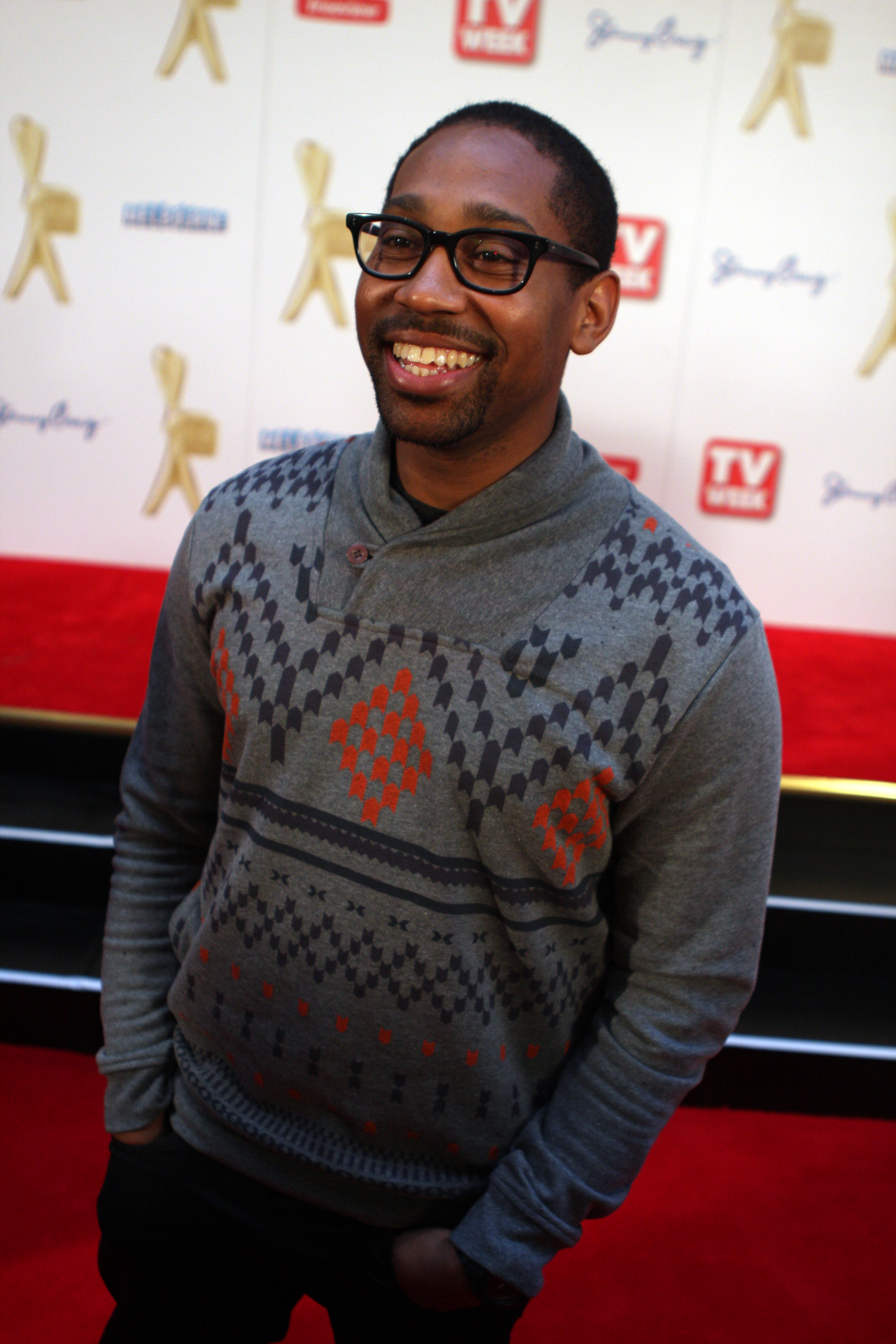
2021 and 2026 winner PJ Morton.

=== 2010s ===
Year	Work	Artist
2012
2012	Hello Fear	Kirk Franklin
2012	Angel & Chanelle (Deluxe Edition)	Trin-I-Tee 5:7
2012	The Journey	Andrae Crouch
2012	The Love Album	Kim Burrell
2012	Something Big	Mary Mary
2013
2013	Gravity	Lecrae
2013	I Win	Marvin Sapp
2013	Identity	James Fortune and FIYA
2013	Jesus at the Center: Live	Israel & New Breed
2013	Worship Soul	Anita Wilson
2014
2014	Greater Than (Live)	Tye Tribbett
2014	Best Days Yet	Bishop Paul S. Morton
2014	Best for Last: 20 Year Celebration Vol. 1	Donald Lawrence
2014	God Chaser (Live)	William Murphy
2014	Grace (Live)	Tasha Cobbs
2015
2015	Help	Erica Campbell
2015	Amazing (Live)	Ricky Dillard and New G
2015	Forever Yours	Smokie Norful
2015	Vintage Worship	Anita Wilson
2015	Withholding Nothing (Live)	William McDowell
2016
2016	Covered: Alive in Asia (Live Deluxe)	Israel & New Breed
2016	Destined to Win (Live)	Karen Clark Sheard
2016	Life Music: Stage Two	Jonathan McReynolds
2016	Living It	Dorinda Clark-Cole
2016	One Place Live	Tasha Cobbs
2017
2017	Losing My Religion	Kirk Franklin
2017	Demonstrate (Live)	William Murphy
2017	Fill This House	Shirley Caesar
2017	Listen	Tim Bowman Jr.
2017	A Worshipper's Heart (Live)	Todd Dulaney
2018
2018	Let Them Fall in Love	CeCe Winans
2018	Bigger Than Me	Le'Andria
2018	Close	Marvin Sapp
2018	Crossover: Live from Music City	Travis Greene
2018	Sunday Song	Anita Wilson
2019
2019	Hiding Place	Tori Kelly
2019	A Great Work	Brian Courtney Wilson
2019	Make Room	Jonathan McReynolds
2019	One Nation Under God	Jekalyn Carr
2019	The Other Side	The Walls Group

=== 2020s ===
Year	Work	Artist
2020
2020	Long Live Love	Kirk Franklin
2020	Goshen	Donald Lawrence presents the Tri-City Singers
2020	Settle Here	William Murphy
2020	Something's Happening! A Christmas Album	CeCe Winans
2020	Tunnel Vision	Gene Moore
2021
2021	Gospel According to PJ: From the Songbook of PJ Morton	PJ Morton
2021	2econd Wind: Ready	Anthony Brown and group therAPy
2021	Choirmaster	Ricky Dillard
2021	Kierra	Kierra Sheard
2021	My Tribute	Myron Butler
2022
2022	Believe for It	CeCe Winans
2022	Changing Your Story	Jekalyn Carr
2022	Jonny X Mali: Live in LA	Jonathan McReynolds and Mali Music
2022	Jubilee: Juneteenth Edition	Maverick City Music
2022	Royalty: Live at the Ryman	Tasha Cobbs Leonard
2023
2023	Kingdom Book One	Maverick City Music and Kirk Franklin
2023	All Things New	Tye Tribbett
2023	Breakthrough: The Exodus (Live)	Ricky Dillard
2023	Clarity	DOE
2023	Die to Live	Maranda Curtis
2024
2024	All Things New: Live in Orlando	Tye Tribbett
2024	Hymns (Live)	Tasha Cobbs Leonard
2024	I Love You	Erica Campbell
2024	The Maverick Way	Maverick City Music
2024	My Truth	Jonathan McReynolds
2025
2025	More Than This	CeCe Winans
2025	Choirmaster II (Live)	Ricky Dillard
2025	Covered Vol. 1	Melvin Crispell III
2025	Father's Day	Kirk Franklin
2025	Still Karen	Karen Clark Sheard
2026
2026	Heart of Mine	Darrell Walls and PJ Morton
2026	Live Breathe Fight	Tamela Mann
2026	Only on the Road (Live)	Tye Tribbett
2026	Sunny Days	Yolanda Adams
2026	Tasha	Tasha Cobbs Leonard
2027
2027	Closer (Live in Chicago)	Jonathan McReynolds
2027	Devotion	Cory Henry
2027	The Hymns	CeCe Winans
2027	Revival: Live in Dallas	Lisa Knowles-Smith and The Brown Singers
2027	Sunday Morning	PJ Morton

- ^{^[I]} Each year is linked to the article about the Grammy Awards held that year.

== See also ==
- Grammy Award for Best Gospel/Contemporary Christian Music Performance
- Grammy Award for Best Gospel Song
