= Help 2.0 =

Studio album by Erica Campbell
- Released: March 31, 2015
- Recorded: 2014–2015
- Genre: Christian R&B, urban gospel
- Length: 50:00 (Standard Edition)
- Label: eOne
- Producer: Warryn Campbell

Erica Campbell chronology
Help (2014)	Help 2.0 (2015)	I Love You (2023)

Singles from More Love
- 1. "More Love" Released: Jan 29, 2015; 2. "I Luh God" Released: Mar 30, 2015

Help 2.0 is a reissue of Erica Campbell's 2014 solo debut album, Help. It was released on March 31, 2015, through Entertainment One Music and was produced by her husband Warryn Campbell. The album was supported by the singles "More Love" and "I Luh God".

== Track listing ==
Credits adapted from liner notes.

No.	Title	Writer(s)	Producer(s)	Length
1.	"Warryn & Erica Convo #1"	W. Campbell (campbell Kids Music/ Ascap)	Warryn Campbell For My Block Inc	0:44
2.	"More Than A Lover Remix (featuring Mr. Talkbox)"	E.campbell, W.campbell (campbell Kids Music/Ascap, Thats Plums Song/emi-sony-atv)	Warryn Campbell For My Block Inc.	3:22
3.	"More Love"	W. Campbell, E. Campbell (campbell Kids Music/ascap, That’s Plums Song/emi-sony-atv)	Warryn Campbell For My Block Inc.	3:35
4.	"I Luh God (featuring Big Shizz)"	W.Campbell, E. Campbell, L. Daniels Campbell Kids Music/Ascap, That’s Plum’s Song/emi-sony Atv, Lashawn Daniels/emi-sony Atv/ascap	Warryn Campbell For My Block Inc & Lashawn Daniels For The Book Productions.	3:09
5.	"Eddie Remix (featuring Jubu)"	E.Campbell, W.Campbell (campbell Kids Music/Ascap, Thats Plums Song/emi-sony- Atv)	Warryn Campbell For My Block Inc.	3:37
6.	"All I Need Is You Remix (featuring Jonathan Mcreynolds)"	E.Campbell, W.Campbell (campbell Kids Music/Ascap, That’s Plums Song/emi-sony-atv)	Warryn Campbell For My Block Inc. Co-produced By: Rodney Jones Jr.	5:09
7.	"I’m A Fan (featuring Jason Crabb)"	G.haddon, T.haddon (precious Baby Publishing/ascap, T Bella Music/ascap, Campbell Kids Music/ascap, Thats Plums Song/emi-sony-atv)	Gerald Haddon For Muzik Majaz Ent. & Warryn Campbell For My Block Inc. Co-produced By Tammi Haddon For Bella Donna Ent.	3:49
8.	"Nobody Else (Thriller Mix)"	Written By E.campbell, W.campbell, L.daniels (campbell Kids Music/ascap, Thats Plums Song/emi-sony-atv,lashawn Daniels/ Emi-sony-atv/ascap)	Warryn Campbell For My Block Inc.	3:17
9.	"A Little More Jesus (featuring Fantasia And Lisa Knowles)"	E. Campbell, T. Campbell, W. Campbell (campbell Kids Music/Ascap, That’s Plum Song/emi-sony-atv, It’s Tea Tyme/emi-sony- Atv)	Warryn Campbell For My Block Inc.	3:55
10.	"P.O.G. Remix"	E.campbell, W.campbell, D. Caddell (campbell Kids Music/Ascap, Thats Plums Song/emi-sony-atv, Gnidybab Music/bmi)	Warryn Campbell For My Block Inc.	4:14
11.	"The Question Classic Rock Mix"	W. Campbell (campbell Kids Music/ascap)	Warryn Campbell For My Block Inc.	5:18
12.	"Warryn & Erica Convo #2"	W. Campbell (campbell Kids Music/Ascap)	Warryn Campbell	0:46
13.	"Looking Like"	E.campbell, W.campbell,g.haddon (campbell Kids Music/ascap, Thats Plums Song/emi-sony- Atv,precious Baby Publishing/ascap)	Warryn Campbell For My Block Inc.	4:05
14.	"Help (featuring Lecrae)"	E. Campbell, W. Campbell	W. Campbell, L. Moore, H. Lilly, A. Sledge, H. Jones, E. Campbell (campbell Kids Music/ascap, Fellowship Of The Unshaed/bmi, Uncle Bobby Music/emi- Sony Atv-bmi, Food 4 Yo Soul/ascap, I Wrote It You Sing It/ascap, That’s Plums Song/ Emi –sony Atv/ascap)	4:05
Total length:				50:00

Notes

- Track 2. All Instruments: Warryn Campbell Guitar: Chris "#9" Payton Talkbox: "mr. Talkbox".
- Track 3. All Instruments: Baby Dubb Background Vocals: Edna Perry And Melodye Perry.
- Track 4. All Instruments: Baby Dubb
- Track 5. Drums: Baby Dubb All Guitars: John "jubu" Smith.
- Track 6. All Instruments: Rodney Jones Jr. Guitar: Dylan Mcgee Jones Background Vocals: The Family And Friends Chorale.
- Track 7. Piano: Gerald Haddon Acoustic Guitars: Chris "#9" Paytonb Ukulele: Tammi Haddon Drums Percussion & Keys: Warryn Campbell.
- Track 8. All Instruments: Warryn Campbell Horns: Dontae Winslow Vocal Production: Lashawn Daniels For The Book Productions And Warryn Campbell.
- Track 9. Drums. Bass Guitar & Fender Rhodes: Warryn Campbell Ac. Guitar: Chris "#9" Payton Organ: Aaron Lindsey Harmonica: Pat Berginson Claps: Marvin Winans Jr., Monique Winans, Erica Campbell, Warryn Campbell, Background Vocals: Chris "#9" Payton, Tina Campbell, Warryn Campbell, Erica Campbell Lisa Knowles Vocals Recorded At Lost Studios By Marque "keybeeetsss" Walker.
- Track 10. All Instruments: Warryn Campbell Background Vocals: The Family And Friends Chorale.
- Track 11. All Instruments: Warryn Campbell Acoustic Guitars: Chris "#9" Payton.
- Track 12. All Instruments: Warryn Campbell
- Track 13. Acoustic Guitars & Banjo: Chris "#9" Payton Drums: Teddy Campbell Bass: Rodney Jones Jr. Keys, Electric Guitars & Percussion: Warryn Campbell Background Vocals: Shanta Atkins, Erica Campbell, Warryn Campbell, Marvin Winans Jr., Jason Mcgee & Psalms
- Track 14. String Arrangement: Jamar Jones Background Vocals: Gromyko Collins, Musiq Soulchild, Krista Campbell, Erica Campbell, Jason Mcgee & Psalms

== Chart performance ==
Charts	Peak
Billboard Top Gospel Albums	1
Billboard Independent Albums	12
Billboard 200	120
