= Branan Murphy =

- Born: August 13, 1986 (age 39); Augusta, Georgia
- Genres: CCM, pop, rap
- Occupations: Singer, Songwriter
- Instruments: Vocals, Guitar
- Years active: 2009–present
- Labels: Paravel Records / Dream Records
- Website: www.brananmurphy.com

Branan Murphy (born August 13, 1986) is a Christian pop vocalist, rapper, songwriter and producer signed to Paravel Records / Dream Records.

== Career ==
Henry “Hank” Branan Murphy grew up in Louisville, GA, first listening to The Beach Boys as a kid and then writing songs and singing in church while in high school. By age 18, he released two independent projects. After moving to Raleigh-Durham, NC in 2011 he released a mixtape called SMPLFY resulting in signing with Sony/Provident's Essential Records.

On April 21, 2017, Murphy released his first single on Sony, "All the Wrong Things." Murphy says about the song, "…I write songs about what it’s like to be human – my own brand of ‘conscious pop’. We are all complex people. We have struggles. We have contradictions. We have deep desires. We are all seeking to be loved, understood and satisfied. My songs attempt to capture those deep emotional, even spiritual, yearnings we have as human beings. The bottom line is that I want to make great art, but most of all I want to be honest. I want to sing about what people are really going through…". The song featured Grammy Award nominee Koryn Hawthorne.

On September 22nd, 2017 Murphy released his second single "Enough" with producer JordanSapp.

Murphy's third single, "Talk About It" was released March 16, 2018, peaking at #37 on the Billboard Airplay Chart.

On September 14, 2018, Murphy released a six-song collection featuring two new tunes, the previously unreleased hip-hop collaboration "Top of the World," featuring Reflection Music Group's Canon and COBRA producer JuiceBangers and "Maybe" along with four previously released tunes that collectively had amassed four+ million streams in just under 16 months: "All The Wrong Things (feat. Grammy Nominated Koryn Hawthorne)," "Enough," "Talk About It" and "My Life." Launching alongside the EP were two new music videos; the multi-format single "My Life," and "Top of the World".

On January 18, 2019, Branan released his fourth radio single "Coming Home".

== Discography ==
=== Albums ===
- Who Am I? (2019)
- Life Is Hard. God Is Good. (2024)

=== EPs ===
- Branan Murphy (2018)
- Better King (2021)

=== Singles ===
Year	Title	Peak chart positions			Album
Year	Title	US Christ	Christ Airplay	Christian Hot AC/ CHR	Album
2017	"All The Wrong Things" (feat. Koryn Hawthorne)	46	32	5	Branan Murphy
2017	"Enough"	38	25	3	Branan Murphy
2018	"Talk About It"	—	37	9	Branan Murphy
2019	"Coming Home"	—	48	5	Who Am I?
2020	"I Will Wait"	—	50	10	Better King
2021	"This World Is Not My Home"	—	45	1	Better King
2021	"Better King"	—	50	7	Better King
2023	"Look At What Grace Can Do"	—	—	—	Life Is Hard. God Is Good.
