= I Love You (Erica Campbell album) =

Studio album by Erica Campbell
- Released: September 15, 2023
- Recorded: 2018–2023
- Genres: Christian R&B, urban gospel
- Length: 44:00
- Label: My Block Inc.
- Producer: Warryn Campbell

Erica Campbell chronology
Help 2.0 (2015)	I Love You (2023)

Singles from I Love You
- 1. "Positive" Released: September 23, 2022; 2. "Feel Alright (Blessed)" Released: January 13, 2023; 3. "Trust And Obey" Released: January 20, 2025

I Love You is the second studio album by American gospel singer Erica Campbell, released on September 15, 2023. It is a follow-up to her 2015 album, Help 2.0. This release marks the second solo studio album apart from her duo of Mary Mary, which is produced by her husband Warryn Campbell and was released under My Block Inc. It was preceded by the singles "Positive" and "Feel Alright (Blessed)". The album received a nomination for Best Gospel Album at the 66th Grammy Awards.

== Background ==
“I Love You” was released September 15, 2023. This release marked Erica’s second solo studio album apart from her duo of Mary Mary, which is produced by her husband Warryn Campbell and was released under My Block Inc.

== Promotion ==
On July 21, 2023, Erica Campbell announced her upcoming second studio album with a short teaser video, which was released on her social media platforms. In the video, Erica wears a “red sweatsuit while sitting on a park bench, writing in a journal, while at a pond”. With the announcement of this album, Erica included a remix of the lead single, “Positive” with preordering the album.

== Singles ==
Between September 23, 2022 and January 20, 2025, Erica released three singles intended for her second studio album: “Positive,” “Feel Alright (Blessed),” and “Trust And Obey”.

The lead single, “Positive,” was released September 23, 2022, along with a music video released March 18, 2023. The song was produced by Warryn Campbell. The music video was directed by James Earl. The second single, “Feel Alright (Blessed),” was released on January 13, 2023, along with a lyric video released on January 20, 2023 and a music video released on May 3, 2023. This was also produced by Warryn Campbell and the music video was directed by Rich Laru. The third single, “Trust And Obey,” was released on January 20, 2025, and premiered on BET Gospel.

== Track listing ==
Credits adapted from liner notes.

No.	Title	Writer(s)	Producer(s)	Length
1.	"ILTL Overture (featuring Jerry Peters)"	Jerry Peters	Warryn Campbell For My Block Inc.	0:43
2.	"I Love The Lord (performed by Erica Campbell and Richard Smallwood and Vision)"	Richard Smallwood	Warryn Campbell For My Block Inc.	5:01
3.	"Thank You, Thank You, Thank You (featuring D Smoke)"	Daniel Farris	Warryn Campbell For My Block Inc.	3:59
4.	"Positive"	Erica Campbell, Juan Winans, and Warryn Campbell	Warryn Campbell For My Block Inc.	3:32
5.	"Dear Jesus (Lude) (performed by Erica Campbell and Stevie Wonder)"	Walter Hawkins	Warryn Campbell For My Block Inc.	1:35
6.	"I Love You"	Erica Campbell and Warryn Campbell	Warryn Campbell For My Block Inc.	3:34
7.	"Feel Alright (Blessed)"	Erica Campbell, Juan Winans, Marvin Winans, and Warryn Campbell	Warryn Campbell For My Block Inc.	4:32
8.	"The One That Got Away (featuring PJ Morton and Zaya Campbell)"	Erica Campbell, Warryn Campbell, and PJ Morton	Warryn Campbell For My Block Inc.	2:19
9.	"Edges (featuring AMS)"	Erica Campbell, Juan Winans, Kwaku Amuti, and Warryn Campbell	Warryn Campbell For My Block Inc.	3:06
10.	"Do You Believe in Love?"	Erica Campbell, Twinkie Clark, Donald Degrate, and Warryn Campbell	Warryn Campbell For My Block Inc.	4:15
11.	"Trust and Obey"	Fannie Johnson and Gromyko Collins	Warryn Campbell For My Block Inc.	3:37
12.	"Sho’ Been Good"	Erica Campbell and Warryn Campbell	Warryn Campbell For My Block Inc.	3:46
13.	"Positive (Remix)"	Erica Campbell, Juan Winans, and Warryn Campbell	Warryn Campbell For My Block Inc. and Wozy Campbell	4:29
Total length:				44:00

== Charts performance ==
Charts	Peak
Billboard Top Gospel Albums	1
