= Live Free (album) =

Studio album by Pastor Mike Jr.
- Released: September 20, 2019
- Genre: gospel; contemporary gospel; rap/hiphop; urban; Christian contemporary
- Length: 41:28
- Language: English
- Label: Blacksmoke Music Worldwide; Rock City Media Group
- Producer: Pastor Mike Jr.

Pastor Mike Jr. chronology
Live Free (2019)	I Got It: Singles Ministry Vol. 1 (2021)

Singles from Live Free
- 1. "Big" Released: May 10, 2019; 2. "I Got It" Released: August 7, 2020

Live Free is the debut studio album by American contemporary gospel musician Pastor Mike Jr. The album was released on September 20, 2019, through Blacksmoke Music Worldwide and Rock City Media Group. The first single to be released off the album was "Big", which peaked at number 1 on the Billboard Hot Gospel Songs and Gospel Airplay charts, as well as number 7 on the Billboard Gospel Digital Song Sales chart. It was a nominee for Contemporary Gospel Recorded Songs of the Year at the 51st GMA Dove Awards. The second single released off the album was "I Got It", which reached number 3 on the Billboard Hot Gospel Songs chart, number 1 on the Gospel Airplay chart, and number 18 on the R&B/Hip-hop Airplay chart. It was nominated for Contemporary Gospel Recorded Song of the Year at the 52nd GMA Dove Awards, and won Urban/Inspiration Single or Performance of the Year at the 2021 Stellar Music Awards.

The album debuted at number 6 on the Billboard Top Gospel Albums chart, and would later reach number 1. It also reached number 20 on the Independent Albums chart. It won Rap/Hip-hop Gospel Album of the Year at the 2020 Stellar Music awards.

== Track listing ==
All tracks are written by Pastor Mike Jr., except where noted.

No.	Title	Writer(s)	Length
1.	"December 10"		0:33
2.	"Big"	Curtis Glenn; Pastor Mike Jr.; Rodney Andre Turner	3:21
3.	"I Got It" (with Kerry Douglas)	Amanda Gentry; Anthony R. Pettus Jr.; Curtis Glenn; Pastor Mike Jr.	4:07
4.	"Look At Me Now"		4:06
5.	"Freedom Chant"		4:17
6.	"Freedom Chant" (reprise)		2:11
7.	"2009 Interlude"		2:11
8.	"Real Love"		2:34
9.	"He So" (with Mission)		3:22
10.	"On God" (with Ray the Great)		3:30
11.	"Feenin" (with Skoolie Escobar)		2:58
12.	"All I Want is You"		3:42
13.	"Big" (extended version)	Curtis Glenn; Pastor Mike Jr.; Rodney Andre Turner	4:29
Total length:			41:28

== Charts ==
Weekly chart performance for Live Free
Chart (2024)	Peak position
US Top Gospel Albums (Billboard)	1
US Independent Albums (Billboard)	20

== Charting songs ==
=== "Big" ===
Weekly chart performance for "Big"
Chart (2024)	Peak position
US Hot Gospel Songs (Billboard)	1
US Gospel Airplay (Billboard)	1
US Gospel Digital Song Sales (Billboard)	7

=== "I Got It" ===
Weekly chart performance for "I Got It"
Chart (2024)	Peak position
US Hot Gospel Songs (Billboard)	3
US Gospel Airplay (Billboard)	1
US R&B/Hip-Hop Airplay (Billboard)	18
