= Gospel trap =

Christian hip hop genre with trap beats

- Other names: Trap gospel
- Stylistic origins: Christian hip hop; trap; Southern hip hop; gospel music
- Cultural origins: Late 2010s, Southern United States

Gospel trap also known as trap gospel is a sub-genre of Christian hip hop that emerged in the southern United States during the late 2010s. It is characterized by the use of trap beats and lyrics about Christianity and Jesus. Gospel trap often include violent metaphors for God's love or allusions to being saved from a life of vanity, crime, and drug use by God. Artists like Alex Jean, Caleb Gordon, BigBreeze, Mike Teezy, and Wande are considered leading figures of the sub-genre.

== History and origins ==
Trap gospel can be traced to Erica Campbell's 2015 hit "I Luh God" which caused controversy for its secular sound. In the late 2010s, members of the 116 Clique also began incorporating trap beats into their music and collaborating with secular trap artists such as Ty Dolla $ign on Lecrae's 2017 song "Blessings".
