= The Walls Group =

American contemporary gospel music group

- Origin: Houston, Texas
- Genres: Contemporary Christian music, Christian R&B, urban contemporary gospel, contemporary R&B, PBR&B, traditional black gospel, Jazz, Soul
- Years active: 2009–present
- Labels: My Block, RCA, Fo Yo Soul, Wall2Wall
- Members: Darrel Walls; Rhea Walls; Alic "Paco" Walls; Ahjah Walls
- Website: thewallsgroup.org

The Walls Group is an American urban contemporary gospel group signed to RCA Records. The group consists of four siblings: two sisters, Rhea Walls and Ahjah Walls, and two brothers, Darrel Walls and Alic "Paco" Walls.

In 2012, the group broke through on the Billboard charts with their album The Walls Group, released on June 11, 2012. On September 2, 2014, they released their debut studio album, Fast Forward, with RCA Records and Fo Yo Soul Recordings, which charted on the Billboard 200.

== History ==
The Houston, Texas-based urban contemporary gospel quartet, The Walls Group, was started in 2009. It is made up of the oldest four of eight siblings; from oldest to youngest: Darrel McGlothen Walls, born February 8, 1991; Rhea Walls, born September 19, 1995; Alic (Paco) Walls, born July 7, 1996; and Ahjah Walls, born November 20, 1997, to Parents Roger and Alicia Wall, affectionately known as Mom and Pop Walls.

(The Walls Group have four younger siblings - Michea, Talia, Nicco, and China Walls - who form the group Walls Infinity, a younger version of The Walls Group. Their grandmother and her sister sing as well.)

The quartet released The Walls Group, with Wall2Wall Entertainment, on June 11, 2012, and the album charted on the Billboard Top Gospel Albums chart at No. 29. This caught the attention of Kirk Franklin, who signed them to Fo Yo Soul Recordings in association with RCA Records.

On their new label, they released their first studio album on September 2, 2014, Fast Forward. The album charted on the Billboard 200 chart at No. 39, and at the No. 1 spot on the Top Gospel Albums chart. The album got two four star out of five reviews from AllMusic's Andy Kellman and Dwayne Lacy of New Release Tuesday, and Daniel Cody of Wade-O Radio says "It's not stale, it's not boring, it's not repetitive, but it is an exciting and fresh album." The group was nominated for Best Gospel Performance/Song at the 57th Annual Grammy Awards, for their song "Love on the Radio". The quartet was nominated at the 30th Stellar Awards in several categories such as: Artist of the Year, Group/Duo of the Year, CD of the Year, the Contemporary Group/Duo of the Year, Contemporary CD of the Year, and Music Video of the Year.

In the beginning of 2020, it was announced that The Walls Group was signed to Warryn Campbell's "My Block" record label along with many other artists.

== Solo Endeavors ==
Every member of the group, excluding Rhea, has partnered with The Session, an independent musical platform. Each member has sung a cover of a song. The videos have been uploaded to YouTube.

Alic Walls, known by his solo stage name Alic, has been releasing and promoting solo (and explicit) secular music. He has released several albums between 2020 and 2021.

== Members ==
- Darrel Walls - tenor
- Rhea Walls - soprano
- Alic “Paco” Walls - baritone
- Ahjah Walls - alto

== Discography ==
=== Studio albums ===
List of studio albums, with selected chart positions
Title	Album details	Peak chart positions	
Title	Album details	US	US Gos
Fast Forward	Released: September 2, 2014; Label: RCA/Fo Yo Soul; CD, digital download	39	1
The Other Side	Released: November 3, 2017; Label: RCA/Fo Yo Soul; CD, digital download	_	6
Four Walls	Released: February 24, 2023; Label: My Block Inc.; CD, digital download	_	12

*- Denotes an album didn't chart, or was not released in that category.

== Awards and nominations ==
Grammy Awards
Year	Nominee / work	Award	Result
2015	"Love On The Radio"	Best Gospel Performance /Song	Nominated
2018	"My Life"	Best Gospel Performance/Song	Nominated
2019	The Other Side	Best Gospel Album	Nominated

Stellar Awards
Year	Nominee / work	Award	Result
2013	"Fast Forward"	Group/Duo Of The Year	Won
2013	Themselves	Traditional Group/Duo Of The Year	Won
2019	Themselves	Duo/Chorus Of The Year	Won
2019	Themselves	Contemporary Duo/Chorus Of The Year	Won
