= Help (Erica Campbell album) =

Studio album by Erica Campbell
- Released: March 25, 2014
- Recorded: 2013–2014
- Genres: Christian R&B, urban gospel
- Length: 51:32 (Standard Edition)
- Label: eOne
- Producer: Warryn Campbell

Erica Campbell chronology
Help (2014)	Help 2.0 (2015)

Singles from Help
- 1. "A Little More Jesus" Released: June 25, 2013; 2. "Help" Released: January 10, 2014; 3. "You Are" Released: August 4, 2014

Help is the debut studio album by gospel musician Erica Campbell, originally released on March 25, 2014, by eOne. This is Erica Campbell's debut studio album without her sister Tina Campbell. The album's release was preceded by the singles "A Little More Jesus", the title track "Help" and "You Are". The album debuted at number 1 on the US Billboard Gospel Albums chart and number 6 on the Billboard 200 with first-week sales of 23,000 copies. The album also won the Grammy Award for Best Gospel Album at the 57th Grammy Awards.

== Background ==
This album was released on March 25, 2014. The release marks the first solo studio album apart from her duo of Mary Mary, which was produced by her husband Warryn Campbell and released under the eOne record label.

== Critical reception ==
Professional ratings
Review scores
Source	Rating
AllMusic	3.5/5 stars
CCM Magazine	5/5 stars
Cross Rhythms	9/10 squares
Los Angeles Times	3/4 stars
New Release Tuesday	4.5/5 stars

Help garnered praise from four music critics ratings and reviews. At Los Angeles Times, Mikael Wood rated the album three out of four stars, stating that on the release "Campbell is always open to more feeling." David Jeffries of AllMusic rated the album three-and-a-half stars out of five, writing that the release "is a return to more traditional themes like prayer, creation, and the struggles of everyday life, while traditional gospel plays more of a role than the usual R&B, thus allowing Erica to show off her vocal talents." At CCM Magazine, Andrew Greer rated the album a perfect five stars, saying that the release "is set to enamor urban music history". Dwayne Lacy of New Release Tuesday rated the album four-and-a-half stars out of five, remarking that the release "was a very good debut offering" on which the production was "nothing short of masterful." In a nine squares review by Cross Rhythms, Stephen Luff believes the music on the album creates a "top debut solo album with the potential for more radio friendly songs" in the near future.

== Commercial performance ==
For the Billboard charting week of April 12, 2014, Help was the No. 6 most sold album in the entirety of the United States by the Billboard 200, and it was the No. 2 Independent Album sold the same week. In addition, the album was the No. 1 most sold Top Gospel Albums.

== Track listing ==
Unless otherwise indicated, Credits are adapted from liner notes.

No.	Title	Writer(s)	Producer(s)	Length
1.	"The Question"	Warryn Campbell	Warryn Campbell	5:17
2.	"You Are"	Erica Campbell, W. Campbell	Warryn Campbell	4:44
3.	"A Little More Jesus"	E. Campbell, W. Campbell, Tina Campbell	Warryn Campbell	3:56
4.	"Help (featuring Lecrae)"	E. Campbell, W. Campbell, Lecrae Moore, Aaron Sledge, Harold Lilly, Hasben Jones	Warryn Campbell	4:57
5.	"I'm a Fan"	Gerald Haddon, Tammi Haddon	Warryn Campbell, Gerald Haddon, Tammi Haddon (Co.)	3:53
6.	"The Atkins House"	W. Campbell	Warryn Campbell	1:08
7.	"Eddie" (Contains a Drum Sample from "Fool Yourself" performed by Little Feat)	E. Campbell, W. Campbell	Warryn Campbell	3:33
8.	"Looking Like"	E. Campbell, W. Campbell, G. Haddon	Warryn Campbell	4:00
9.	"P.O.G"	E. Campbell, W. Campbell, Dayna Caddell	Warryn Campbell, TRiON (co.), Augie Ray (of TRiON), Jintae Ko (of TRiON)	4:19
10.	"More Than a Lover" (Contains Re-Sung Lyrics from "More Than a Woman" performed by Aaliyah)	E. Campbell, W. Campbell	Warryn Campbell, TRiON (co.), Augie Ray (of TRiON), Jintae Ko (of TRiON)	3:20
11.	"Nobody Else"	E. Campbell, W. Campbell, LaShawn Daniels	Warryn Campbell (All Instruments), LaShawn Daniels (Vocals)	3:05
12.	"All I Need Is You"	E. Campbell, W. Campbell	Warryn Campbell	5:59
13.	"Changes"	Percy Bady	Warryn Campbell	3:39
Total length:				51:32

== Personnel ==
- Erica Campbell - Primary Artist, Vocals (tracks 1, 5, 7, 11; Lead on 2–4, 8–10, 12–13), Handclaps (3) & Background Vocals (2–4, 8, 13)
- Warryn Campbell - Executive Producer, Musical Arrangements (tracks 1–4, 7–11), Banjo (13), Handclaps (3), Drums (3, 5), Fender Rhodes (3), Bass Guitar (3), Electric Guitar (8; Additional on 2), Instruments (9–10, 12; All Other on 1, 11; Additional on 7, 13), Keyboards (2, 8; Additional on 5), Percussion (2, 5, 8), Ukulele (13) & Background Vocals (2–4, 8, 13)
- Krista Campbell - Dialogue (track 6) & Background Vocals (4)
- Tina Campbell - Background Vocals (track 3)
- Teddy Campbell - Drums (tracks 2, 8)
- The Atkins Girls (Erica, Tina, Thomasina, Alana & Shanta) - Vocals sung by (track 6)
- Thomasina 'Goo Goo' Atkins - Wardrobe & Background Vocals
- Alana Atkins-Jamison - Background Vocals
- Shanta Atkins - Background Vocals (tracks 2, 8)
- Honey Atkins - Piano (track 6)
- Aaron Lindsey - Organ (track 3)
- Chris "#9" Payton - Banjo (track 8), Acoustic Guitar (1–3, 5, 8, 13), Electric Guitar Soloist (2) & Background Vocals (3)
- Derek Blanks - Art Direction, Design & Photography
- Dontae Winslow - Horns (tracks 2, 11)
- Gerald Haddon - Piano (track 5)
- Gromyko Collins - Background Vocals (track 4)
- TRiON (Augie Ray & Jintae Ko) -
  Additional Instruments played & programmed by (tracks 9–10)
- Jamar Jones - String Arrangements (track 4)
- James Cruz - Mastering
- Jason McGee - Background Vocals (tracks 4, 8)
- Larry Whitt - Recording Engineer (All Tracks)
- Lecrae - Featured Artist,
  Rap Vocals performed by (track 4)
- Major Johnson - Dialogue (track 6)
- Marvin Winans Jr - Handclaps (track 3) & Background Vocals (2, 8)
- Monique Winans - Handclaps (track 3)
- Musiq Soulchild - Background Vocals (track 4)
- Pat Berginson - Harmonica (track 3)
- Psalms - Background Vocals (tracks 4, 8)
- Rob Chiarelli - Audio Mixing (All Tracks)
- Rodney Jones Jr. - Bass played by
  (tracks 2, 7–8, 11)
- Sean Cooper - Talk Box (track 10)
- Tammi Haddon - Ukulele (track 5)
- Terrell Mullin - Hair Stylist & Make-Up
- The Family and Friends Chorale - Background Vocals (tracks 9, 12)

== Chart performance ==
Chart (2014)	Peak position
US Billboard 200	6
US Top Gospel Albums (Billboard)	1
US Independent Albums (Billboard)	2
