= Mary Mary (TV series) =

American reality television series

- Tina Campbell and Erica Campbell
- Genre: Reality
- Starring: Tina Campbell; Erica Campbell
- Country of origin: United States
- Original language: English
- No. of seasons: 6
- No. of episodes: 61

Production
- Executive producers: Tara Long; John Morayniss; Eric Hoberman; Howie Long; Lauren P. Gellert; Kate Farrell
- Running time: 42 minutes
- Production company: Entertainment One Television

Original release
- Network: WE tv
- Release: March 29, 2012 – November 2, 2017

Mary Mary is an American reality television series that aired on WE tv from March 29, 2012, to November 2, 2017. The series follows the daily lives of sisters and musicians, Erica and Tina Campbell, of Mary Mary, as they balance their households and careers.

== Episodes ==
=== Series overview ===
Season	Episodes	Originally released	
Season	Episodes	First released	Last released
1	10	March 29, 2012	May 31, 2012
2	13	December 6, 2012	February 28, 2013
3	12	February 27, 2014	May 15, 2014
4	10	March 5, 2015	May 7, 2015
5	10	March 3, 2016	May 5, 2016
6	6	September 28, 2017	November 2, 2017

=== Season 1 (2012) ===
No. overall	No. in series	Title	Original release date
1	1	"Giving Thanks"	March 29, 2012
2	2	"Road Kill"	April 5, 2012
3	3	"De-tour"	April 12, 2012
4	4	"Proposed Hit"	April 19, 2012
5	5	"Sisters Trippin'"	April 26, 2012
6	6	"Oh Baby!"	May 3, 2012
7	7	"Singing the Blues"	May 10, 2012
8	8	"Future Shock"	May 17, 2012
9	9	"On the Brink"	May 24, 2012
10	10	"Grammys Push"	May 31, 2012

=== Season 2 (2012–13) ===
No. overall	No. in series	Title	Original release date
11	1	"Road Test"	December 6, 2012
12	2	"Bachelorette Party"	December 13, 2012
13	3	"Boyfriend Drama"	December 20, 2012
14	4	"All Night Wrong"	December 27, 2012
15	5	"Wedding Crasher"	January 3, 2013
16	6	"The Showdown"	January 10, 2013
17	7	"Pregnant Pause"	January 17, 2013
18	8	"Solo Opportunity"	January 24, 2013
19	9	"Fight of a Lifetime"	January 31, 2013
20	10	"Essence of the Conflict"	February 7, 2013
21	11	"New Beginnings"	February 14, 2013
22	12	"Beginning of the End"	February 21, 2013
23	13	"Crossroads"	February 28, 2013

=== Season 3 (2014) ===
No. overall	No. in series	Title	Original release date	US viewers (millions)
24	1	"Family Feud"	February 27, 2014	0.95
25	2	"Tina Tells All"	March 6, 2014	1.05
26	3	"Performing in Pain"	March 13, 2014	0.94
27	4	"Clouding With a Chance of Pain"	March 20, 2014	0.56
28	5	"Bahama Drama"	March 27, 2014	0.92
29	6	"Cover Girls"	April 3, 2014	1.03
30	7	"Changes"	April 10, 2014	1.12
31	8	"Holding the Fort"	April 17, 2014	0.93
32	9	"The Last Chord"	April 24, 2014	1.07
33	10	"Tragedy Strikes"	May 1, 2014	0.80
34	11	"Australian Tour"	May 8, 2014	0.76
35	12	"Road Warriors"	May 15, 2014	0.68

=== Season 4 (2015) ===
No. overall	No. in series	Title	Original release date
36	1	"Solo Sisters"	March 5, 2015
37	2	"A Tale of Two Tinas"	March 12, 2015
38	3	"Hitched and Mitch'd"	March 19, 2015
39	4	"Mary Mary Together Again"	March 26, 2015
40	5	"I'm Gonna Kill Somebody!"	April 2, 2015
41	6	"Twisted Sisters"	April 9, 2015
42	7	"Sailing Apart"	April 16, 2015
43	8	"Out With a Bang!"	April 23, 2015
44	9	"Life's a Mitch"	April 30, 2015
45	10	"Hail Mary"	May 7, 2015

=== Season 5 (2016) ===
No. overall	No. in series	Title	Original release date
46	1	"Sister Dissed Him"	March 3, 2016
47	2	"The Goo, the Bad & the Ugly"	March 10, 2016
48	3	"Tina's Tour Troubles"	March 17, 2016
49	4	"I Only Have Eyes for Goo"	March 24, 2016
50	5	"Ain't That a Mitch!"	March 31, 2016
51	6	"Desperate Times, Desperate Measures"	April 7, 2016
52	7	"Stressed & Blessed"	April 14, 2016
53	8	"All You Need Is Dubb"	April 21, 2016
54	9	"Finding a Mary"	April 28, 2016
55	10	"Is This the End?"	May 5, 2016

=== Season 6 (2017) ===
No. overall	No. in series	Title	Original release date	US viewers (millions)
56	1	"Mary Vs. Mary"	September 28, 2017	0.54
57	2	"Who Is Number 1?"	October 5, 2017	0.40
58	3	"Do You Still Love Him?"	October 12, 2017	0.49
59	4	"Kenya Make It On Time?"	October 19, 2017	0.41
60	5	"Cut the Cameras!"	October 26, 2017	0.42
61	6	"Farewell, Mary Mary"	November 2, 2017	0.51

== International airings ==
Mary Mary began airing on The Africa Channel in Europe and Asia from July 19, 2013.
