= Tiff Joy =

American gospel musician (born 1986)

- Also known as: Tiff Joy
- Born: Tiffany Joy McGhee; April 7, 1986 (age 39)
- Origin: Chicago, Illinois
- Genres: urban contemporary gospel
- Occupations: Singer, songwriter
- Instruments: vocals, singer-songwriter
- Years active: 2014–present
- Labels: Tyscot, WalkWay, VMan
- Website: tiffjoy.com

Tiffany Joy McGhee (born April 7, 1986), who goes by the stage name Tiff Joy, is an American urban contemporary gospel artist and musician. She started her music career, in 2014, by performing on an album by Ricky Dillard. Her first studio album, TIFF JOY, was released on September 25, 2015, by WalkWay Music Group, VMan Entertainment, and Tyscot Records. This album was her breakthrough release upon the Billboard magazine charts.

== Early life ==
Tiff Joy was born Tiffany Joy McGhee, on April 7, 1986, the daughter of Pastors Timothy and Bernadine Bell-McGhee of the Free Spirit Ministerial Worship Center congregation in Chicago, Illinois, where she was raised.

== Music career ==
Her music career started in 2014, with the appearance on Ricky Dillard's live album Amazing, on the song, "Amazing", which won a Stellar Award. She released TIFF JOY, a studio album, on September 25, 2015, with WalkWay Music Group, VMan Entertainment, and Tyscot Records. This album was her breakthrough release upon the Billboard magazine Gospel Albums chart, where it peaked at No. 5. The song, "The Promise", has peaked on the Gospel Airplay chart at No. 26.

== Discography ==
=== Studio albums ===
List of studio albums, with selected chart positions
Title	Album details	Peak chart positions
Title	Album details	US Gos
TIFF JOY	Released: September 25, 2015; Label: WalkWay, VMan, Tyscot; CD, digital download	5
