= Koryn Hawthorne =

American gospel singer (born 1997)

- Born: Koryn Mattanah Hawthorne; December 26, 1997 (age 28); Abbeville, Louisiana, U.S.
- Genres: Contemporary Christian music; gospel; soul; R&B
- Occupation: Singer
- Website: korynhawthorne.com

Koryn Mattanah Hawthorne (born December 26, 1997) is an American contemporary Christian music and gospel singer. Hawthorne was a finalist in season 8 of NBC's singing competition The Voice, at the age of 17, as a member on Pharrell Williams's team. After placing fourth on the show, Hawthorne got signed to RCA Inspiration, a division of Sony Music dedicated to gospel music recordings. Her debut studio album, Unstoppable, was released on July 13, 2018, and earned her multiple awards nominations, including two Grammy nominations.

== Career ==
=== The Voice (2015) ===
Koryn Hawthorne auditioned for the 8th season of The Voice singing Emeli Sandé's "My Kind of Love". Both Christina Aguilera and Pharrell Williams turned around. Hawthorne chose Aguilera as her coach. In the Battle rounds, Hawthorne faced Vance Smith, where they sang "Love Me Harder", a duet by Ariana Grande and The Weeknd. Aguilera deemed Hawthorne the winner and advanced her to the Knockout rounds. During the Knockouts, Hawthorne covered "Try" but lost to her opponent Kimberly Nichole. She was then stolen by Williams, and continued the competition on his team.

During the Playoffs she sang How Great Thou Art but was not chosen by the public, who could only save two artists from Williams' team. Williams, who could save one of his three remaining artists, chose her. The following week, she sang Kelly Clarkson's "Stronger (What Doesn't Kill You)" and was saved by public voting. In the Top 10 she performed "Make It Rain" by Foy Vance, reaching the third position on iTunes and debuting at the 84th position on Hot 100. The following week, she covered "Girl on Fire" by Alicia Keys and was saved by the public.

In the Top 6, Hawthorne showed her rock side by covering R.E.M's "Everybody Hurts" and Aerosmith's "Dream On". In the Top 5, after singing U2's "One" and the traditional song, "Oh Mary Don't You Weep", she was, alongside India Carney, in the bottom two. She sang Beyoncé's "If I Were a Boy" for her last chance performance, being instantly saved over Carney. In the finale, Hawthorne performed "It's a Man's Man's Man's World" by James Brown, The Beatles' "We Can Work It Out" with coach Williams and also her original song "Bright Fire", written by Williams. She finished in 4th place.

==== The Voice performances ====
– Studio version of performance reached the top 10 on iTunes

Stage	Song	Original Artist	Date	Order	Result
Blind Auditions	"My Kind of Love"	Emeli Sandé	March 3, 2015	4.2	Christina and Pharrell turned Joined Team Christina
Battle Rounds (Top 48)	"Love Me Harder" (vs. Vance Smith)	Ariana Grande	March 17, 2015	9.3	Saved by Coach
Knockout Rounds (Top 32)	"Try" (vs. Kimberly Nichole)	Pink	March 23, 2015	10.6	Defeated; Stolen by Pharrell Williams
Live Playoffs (Top 20)	"How Great Thou Art"	Christian hymn	April 6, 2015	14.6	Saved by Coach
Live Top 12	"Stronger (What Doesn't Kill You)"	Kelly Clarkson	April 13, 2015	17.9	Saved by Public Vote
Live Top 10	"Make It Rain"	Foy Vance	April 20, 2015	19.5	Saved by Public Vote
Live Top 8	"Girl on Fire"	Alicia Keys	April 27, 2015	21.8	Saved by Public Vote
Live Top 6	"Everybody Hurts"	R.E.M.	May 4, 2015	23.3	Saved by Public Vote
Live Top 6	"Dream On"	Aerosmith	May 4, 2015	23.9	Saved by Public Vote
Live Semi-Finals (Top 5)	"One"	U2	May 11, 2015	25.2	Bottom 2 Saved by Instant Save
Live Semi-Finals (Top 5)	"Oh Mary Don't You Weep"	Traditional	May 11, 2015	25.7	Bottom 2 Saved by Instant Save
Live Semi-Finals (Top 5)	"If I Were a Boy"	Beyoncé	May 12, 2015	26.2	Bottom 2 Saved by Instant Save
Live Finale (Final 4)	"It's a Man's Man's Man's World"	James Brown	May 18, 2015	27.1	4th place
Live Finale (Final 4)	"We Can Work It Out" (with Pharrell Williams)	The Beatles	May 18, 2015	27.6	4th place
Live Finale (Final 4)	"Bright Fire" (original song)	Hawthorne	May 18, 2015	27.10	4th place

=== 2016–2017: Record deal and EP release ===
After finishing in fourth place on The Voice, Hawthorne got signed to RCA Inspiration, a division of Sony Music dedicated to gospel music recordings, and started working on her debut material. In February 2016, she announced via Twitter she would be guest-starring on the fifth season of Mary Mary, that first aired on March 3. On the reality TV show, Hawthorne got to know producer Warryn Campbell, who would later help to produce her original material. On March 6, 2016, the TV show Saints & Sinners, in which Hawthorne recorded the song Saints & Sinners for the original soundtrack, was premiered on Bounce TV. In 2017, Hawthorne collaborated with Christian recording artist Branan Murphy on the single "All the Wrong Things". Following the appearance on Mary Mary, Hawthorne made a guest appearance on OWN's TV show Greenleaf, debuting "Won't He Do It", the lead single from her debut material.

Koryn Hawthorne – EP, a four-track EP, was released on August 11, 2017. Hawthorne's vocals and delivery attracted Grammy Award-winning producers and songwriters Warryn Campbell, Makeba Riddick, Bernie Herms and Joaquin "The Bear" Bynum, who produced and penned her debut material. The EP earned Hawthorne two Stellar Gospel Music Awards nominations for New Artist of the Year and Contemporary Female Vocalist of the Year.

=== 2018–2019: Debut album release and Grammy Awards nomination ===
Koryn's full-length debut, Unstoppable, was released on July 13, 2018, and reached number 1 on the Top Gospel Albums, while the album's lead single, "Won't He Do It", reached number 1 on Billboard's three main gospel charts. Hawthorne is the first woman to top four gospel charts simultaneously in five years as well as the longest number 1 female artist holder on Billboard's Hot Gospel Songs Chart.

Alongside Jeremy Camp, Matthew West and Rend Collective, she was one of the attractions of the Christian music's summer concert event Summer Lights Tour, which started on July 12, 2018, in Detroit and ended on July 22, 2018, in Corbin.

On July 26, 2018, Aaron Cole's new single, "Down Like That", in which Koryn is featured, was released.

Later this year, Hawthorne was nominated for the 49th Annual GMA Dove Awards in two categories: New Artist of the Year and Contemporary Gospel/Urban Recorded Song of the Year for her debut single "Won't He Do It", and won the latter.

In November 2018, Hawthorne took the stage on Soul Train Awards, performing her hit single "Won't He Do It".

In February 2019, the music video for "Unstoppable" was released, featuring Lecrae.

Koryn Hawthorne received a nomination for Best Gospel Performance/Song ("Won't He Do It") on the 61st Grammy Award. She also received seven Stellar Awards nominations and two NAACP Image Awards nominations, having won one from each award. Later this year, she was nominated for the Billboard Music Awards 2019, in three categories.

In August 2019, Koryn contributed to Overcomer soundtrack with the single "Enough".

Hawthorne was nominated for Best Gospel Performance/Song ("Speak the Name") on the 62nd Grammy Awards, making it her second Grammy nomination.

In December 2019, Koryn's debut single "Won't He Do It" was officially certified Gold.

=== 2020–present: ‘’I AM’’ ===
On July 24, 2020, Koryn released "Pray", the lead single from her second album, which reached number 1 on Billboard's Gospel Digital Song Sales chart. On August 7, the album's second single, "Speak to Me", was released. Hawthorne's album, ‘’I AM’’, was released on September 18, 2020.

For the second year in a row, Koryn Hawthorne was nominated for Billboard Top Gospel Artist category alongside Kirk Franklin, Tasha Cobbs Leonard, Sunday Service Choir and Kanye West.

Koryn was nominated for the Best Gospel/Inspirational Award on BET’s annual Soul Train Awards 2020, competing against long-time artists Bebe Winans, Kirk Franklin, Marvin Sapp, PJ Morton and The Clark Sisters.

In February 2021, Hawthorne was nominated for the Best Gospel/Christian Album on NAACP Image Award. Koryn was also nominated for the third year in a row for the Billboard Music Awards 2021, in three categories. Her single "Speak to Me" was nominated for two categories on the 52nd GMA Dove Awards: Song of the Year and Contemporary Gospel Recorded Song of the Year.

== Influences ==
Hawthorne cites a variety of artists as her main influences and inspirations, including Etta James, Mary J. Blige, Tina Turner, Michael Jackson, Lauryn Hill, Fred Hammond, Mary Mary, Kirk Franklin, among others.

== Discography ==
=== Studio albums ===
List of studio albums with selected chart positions
Title	Album details	Peak chart positions	Sales
Title	Album details	Top Gospel Albums	Sales
Unstoppable	Released: July 13, 2018; Label: RCA Inspiration; Format: CD, digital download, streaming	1	US: 100,000
I AM	Released: September 18, 2020; Label: RCA Inspiration; Format: CD, digital download, streaming	2	US: 70,000
On God...	Released: February 9, 2024; Label: Provident Label Group; Format: CD, digital download, streaming	6	US: 40,000

=== EPs ===
List of EPs with selected chart positions
Title	Album details	Peak chart positions	Sales
Title	Album details	Top Gospel Albums	Sales
Koryn Hawthorne – EP	Released: August 11, 2017; Label: RCA Inspiration; Format: Digital download, streaming	19	US: 40,000

=== Singles ===
==== As lead artist ====
List of singles as lead artist with selected chart positions
Year	Title	Peak chart positions			Certifications	Album
Year	Title	US Gospel	Gospel Digital	Gospel Airplay	Certifications	Album
2017	"Won't He Do It"	1	1	1	RIAA: Platinum	Unstoppable
2017	"Speak the Name" (featuring Natalie Grant)	14	3	—		Unstoppable
2019	"Unstoppable"	3	5	5		Unstoppable
2019	"Enough"	23	11	—		Overcomer (Music from and Inspired by the Original Motion Picture)
2020	"Pray"	12	1	—		I AM
2020	"Speak to Me"	1	1	1		I AM
2023	"Cry"	12	8	—		On God
2023	"Look at God"	3	3	1		On God
2026	"His Favorite"	5	5	11		—N/a
"—" denotes releases that did not chart or were not released in that territory.

==== Other charted songs ====
List of singles as lead artist with selected chart positions
Year	Title	Peak chart positions		Album
Year	Title	Hot Christian Songs	Gospel Digital	Album
2020	"How Great"	41	—	I AM
2020	"Know You" (featuring Steffany Gretzinger)	—	10	I AM

==== Promotional singles ====
Year	Título	Album
2018	"Down Goes Rome"	Unstoppable
2023	"Cut ‘Em Off"	On God

==== As featured artist ====
List of singles as featured artist with selected chart positions
Year	Title	Peak chart positions			Album
Year	Title	Hot Christian Songs	Christian Airplay Songs	Gospel Digital	Album
2017	"All The Wrong Things" (Branan Murphy featuring Koryn Hawthorne)	46	32	—	Who Am I?
2018	"Down Like That" (Aaron Cole featuring Koryn Hawthorne)	—	—	—	Cole Season (Playlist)
2021	"We All Need Jesus" (Danny Gokey featuring Koryn Hawthorne)	35	25	3	Jesus People
"—" denotes releases that did not chart or were not released in that territory.

=== Releases from The Voice ===
Albums

Title	Details	Peak positions	Sales
Title	Details	US	Sales
The Voice: The Complete Season 8 Collection	Released: May 19, 2015; Label: Republic Records; Formats: Digital download	85	US: 20,000

Competition singles

Year	Title	Peak chart positions							Album
Year	Title	US	Hot R&B Songs	R&B Digital Songs	Hot Gospel Songs	Christian Digital Songs	Hot Christian Songs	iTunes	Album
2015	"My Kind of Love"	—	—	—	—	—	—	—	The Voice: The Complete; Season 8 Collection
2015	"Try"	—	—	—	—	—	—	—	The Voice: The Complete; Season 8 Collection
2015	"How Great Thou Art"	—	—	—	1	—	—	77	The Voice: The Complete; Season 8 Collection
2015	"Stronger (What Doesn't Kill You)"	—	—	—	—	—	—	34	The Voice: The Complete; Season 8 Collection
2015	"Make It Rain"	84	22	—	—	—	—	3	The Voice: The Complete; Season 8 Collection
2015	"Girl on Fire"	—	—	—	—	—	—	37	The Voice: The Complete; Season 8 Collection
2015	"Everybody Hurts"	—	—	—	—	—	—	36	The Voice: The Complete; Season 8 Collection
2015	"Dream On"	—	—	—	—	—	—	52	The Voice: The Complete; Season 8 Collection
2015	"One"	—	—	—	—	—	—	60	The Voice: The Complete; Season 8 Collection
2015	"Oh Mary Don't You Weep"	—	—	—	—	1	8	28	The Voice: The Complete; Season 8 Collection
2015	"It's a Man's Man's Man's World"	—	15	—	—	—	—	34	The Voice: The Complete; Season 8 Collection
2015	"Bright Fire (Original song)"	—	—	12	—	—	—	18	The Voice: The Complete; Season 8 Collection
"—" denotes releases that did not chart

== Awards and nominations ==
=== American Music Awards ===
Year	Nominee / work	Award	Result
2021	Koryn Hawthorne	Favorite Gospel Artist	Nominated

=== Billboard Music Awards ===
Year	Nominee / work	Award	Result
2019	Koryn Hawthorne		Nominated
2019	Unstoppable	Top Gospel Album	Nominated
2019	"Won't He Do It"	Top Gospel Song	Won
2020	Koryn Hawthorne	Top Gospel Artist	Nominated
2021	Koryn Hawthorne	Top Gospel Artist	Nominated
2021	I AM	Top Gospel Album	Nominated
2021	"Speak to Me"	Top Gospel Song	Nominated

=== GMA Dove Awards ===
Year	Nominee / work	Award	Result
2018	Koryn Hawthorne	New Artist of the	Nominated
2018	"Won't He Do It"	Contemporary Gospel/Urban Recorded Song of the Year	Won
2019	Koryn Hawthorne	Gospel Artist of the Year	Nominated
2019	"Won't He Do It"	Song of the Year	Nominated
2019	"Unstoppable"	Contemporary Gospel Recorded Song of the Year	Nominated
2019	Unstoppable	Contemporary Gospel Album of the Year	Won
2020	Koryn Hawthorne	Best Gospel/Inspirational Award	Nominated
2021	"Speak to Me"	Song of the Year	Nominated
2021	I Am	Contemporary Gospel Album of the Year	Won

=== Grammy Awards ===
Year	Nominee / work	Award	Result
2019	"Won't He Do It"	Best Gospel Performance/Song	Nominated
2020	"Speak the Name"	Best Gospel Performance/Song	Nominated

=== NAACP Image Awards ===
Year	Nominee / work	Award	Result
2019	Koryn Hawthorne	Outstanding New Artist	Nominated
2019	Unstoppable	Outstanding Gospel Album (Traditional or Contemporary)	Won
2021	I AM	Outstanding Gospel/Christian Album	Nominated

=== Stellar Gospel Music Awards ===
Year	Nominee / work	Award	Result
2018	Koryn Hawthorne	New Artist of the Year	Nominated
2018	Koryn Hawthorne	Contemporary Female Vocalist of the Year	Nominated
2019	Koryn Hawthorne	Artist of the Year	Nominated
2019	Koryn Hawthorne	Albertina Walker Female Vocalist of the Year	Nominated
2019	Koryn Hawthorne	Producer of the Year	Nominated
2019	Koryn Hawthorne	Contemporary Female Vocalist of the Year	Nominated
2019	"Won't He Do It"	Song of the Year	Nominated
2019	"Won't He Do It"	Music Video of the Year	Won
2019	Unstoppable	Contemporary CD of the Year	Nominated

=== Soul Train Awards ===
Year	Nominee / work	Award	Result
2020	Koryn Hawthorne	Best Gospel/Inspirational Award	Nominated
