= I Luh God =

Single by Erica Campbell featuring Big Shizz

from the album Help 2.0
- Released: March 30, 2015
- Genre: Urban contemporary gospel
- Length: 3:08
- Label: eOne
- Songwriters: Warryn Campbell; Erica Campbell; LaShawn Daniels
- Producer: Daniels

Erica Campbell singles chronology
"More Love" (2015)	"I Luh God" (2015)	"Well Done" (2017)

"I Luh God" is a song by American gospel singer Erica Campbell of Mary Mary. The song also features American gospel rapper LaShawn Daniels, who produced the song, also known as Big Shizz, who is uncredited. It is her second single from her album Help 2.0. The song is considered to be an example of an uprising music genre called "trap gospel", as it has a drum machine, bass, and a rap tone in Campbell's voice. The song has caused controversy, with many people claiming the song's sound too secular. In the course of the song, Campbell seems to call out the very voices and messages that are traditionally associated with the beat. “You ain’t got the money moving by yourself/And you know you did it with a lot of help/You know it’s only one, it ain’t nobody else”The lines immediately recall Drake‘s “All Me,” featuring Big Sean and 2 Chainz, which boasts “Came up, that’s all me/Stayed true, that’s all me/No help that’s all me, all me for real.”

"They're used to (me) very pulled up and polished and singing 'Yesterday' and 'Help.' But, I just wanted to have fun, declare my love for God and at the same time reach an audience that I think the gospel community sometimes ignores, "There is Christian hip-hop but I feel that more Caucasian children gravitate to it. So, I figured, you're my people so, let me get with my folks!" Campbell told CNikky.com.The song topped the Billboard Gospel chart, and, as of January 2018, the video has over eleven million views on her YouTube account.

== History ==
The song was released on March 31, 2015. The music video was released on her YouTube channel on June 12, 2015 and on her Vevo account on June 16, 2015. The song was announced via her social media accounts, She released the cover art on her Instagram account. the song was actually inspired by "CoCo" by O.T. Genasis, as which Campbell refers to as a "Cocaine Anthem".

"I was listening to the radio. Some song called 'I'm In Love With The CoCo' came on, and I got upset 'cause I'm like, this is what kids are singing and saying over and over," Campbell said in a Rapzilla Interview. "Why can't [Christians] change that? We got some crazy writers, incredible artists that love Jesus. Let's infiltrate! Let's get in there and change it." Campbell told to CPentertainment.com.

== Awards/Nominations ==
The song was nominated for Top Gospel Song at the 2016 Billboard Music Awards and won the award for Best Contemporary Gospel Recording of the Year at the 47th annual Dove Awards.

== Chart performance ==
Charts	Peak
Billboard Hot Gospel Songs	1
Billboard Gospel Airplay	12
Billboard Gospel Digital Songs	1
Billboard Gospel Streaming Songs	1
