= Adia (musician) =

American musician (born 1991)

- Adia in 2026

Background information
- Born: Destiny Adia Andrews; May 15, 1991 (age 35); St. Louis, Missouri
- Genres: Christian R&B, urban contemporary gospel, contemporary R&B
- Occupations: Singer, songwriter
- Instruments: vocals, singer-songwriter
- Years active: 2012–present
- Labels: Emerge, Xist
- Website: adiaofficial.com

Destiny Adia Andrews (born May 15, 1991), who goes by the stage name Adia, is an American Christian R&B artist and urban contemporary gospel musician. She started her music career, in 2012, with the release of "One Day at a Time" on Emerge Records. She saw her first studio album, Behind Enemy Lines, chart on the Billboard Top Gospel Albums chart. Xist Music released the album on August 26, 2014.

== Early life ==
Adia was born Destiny Adia Andrews, in St. Louis, Missouri, on May 15, 1991. While she was growing up, she spent some time in Aurora, Illinois, just outside Chicago. She graduated from Sparkman High School, in 2009, and it is just outside Huntsville, Alabama that she considers to be her hometown. Her family contains musical roots because her parents are also traveling musicians.

== Music career ==
Her music career started in 2012, with the release of "Incomplete", that was on Deitrick Haddon's, A Beautiful Soul, with Emerged Records. Her debut single and music video, "Rags to Riches", came out on March 14, 2014, from Xist Music. The production was handled by Fred "Blaze" Crawford and the video direction by Courtney "Noyz" C. The second single, "Torn Identity", was released just before her album. Her debut studio album, Behind Enemy Lines, released on August 26, 2014, with Xist Music, and this album charted, on the Billboard Top Gospel Albums chart at No. 38. The album received a three star out of five review, from CCM Magazine's Andrew Greer. On August 16, 2016 she released a cover track "We All Want Love" via: Red 3 Digital Learning Center.

== Personal life ==
Every single bit of profit from "One Day at a Time", she gave to the victims of the 2011 Super Outbreak.

== Discography ==
=== Studio albums ===
List of studio albums, with selected chart positions
Title	Album details
Behind Enemy Lines	Released: August 26, 2014; Label: Xist; CD, digital download

== Awards and nominations ==
=== Stellar Music Awards ===
Year	Nominee / work	Category	Result	Ref.
2026	"On the Way" (with Erica Campbell)	Song of the Year	Nominated	
2026	"On the Way" (with Erica Campbell)	Music Video of the Year	Nominated	
2026	"On the Way" (with Erica Campbell)	Urban Single or Performance of the Year	Won	
2026	Herself	Albertina Walker Female Artist of the Year	Nominated	
2026	Herself	Contemporary Female Artist of the Year	Nominated	
