= Erica Campbell =

American singer-songwriter (born 1972)

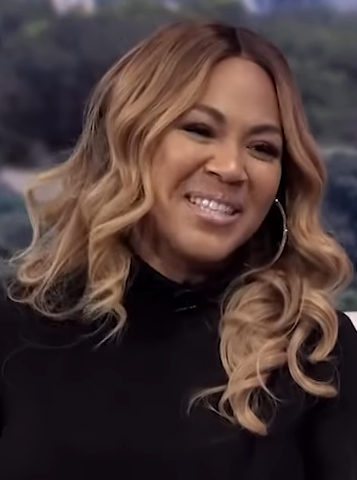
- Campbell in October 2019

Background information
- Also known as: Erica Atkins-Campbell
- Born: Erica Monique Atkins; April 29, 1972 (age 54); Inglewood, California, U.S.
- Genres: Christian; urban gospel
- Occupations: Singer; songwriter
- Years active: 1998–present
- Labels: MyBlock Inc; Universal Music Group
- Member of: Mary Mary
- Spouse: Warryn Campbell (m. 2001)

Erica Monique Campbell (née Atkins; born April 29, 1972) is an American Gospel singer and songwriter. Specializing in the urban contemporary gospel, Christian R&B, and contemporary R&B genres, she started her music career in the late 1990s with her younger sister, Tina Campbell, as part of the group Mary Mary.

Her debut solo album Help (2014), reached the top 10 on the Billboard 200 chart, and won the Grammy Award for Best Gospel Album at the 57th Grammy Awards. The album's reissue, Help 2.0. (2015), included the gospel trap single "I Luh God", which reached number one on the gospel chart. She released her second album I Love You in 2023. Her 2024 collaborative track "One Hallelujah" alongside Tasha Cobbs Leonard, Israel Houghton, Jonathan McReynolds and Jekalyn Carr won the Grammy Award for Best Gospel Performance/Song.

In addition to her music career, Campbell has made appearances in the films Sister Act 2: Back in the Habit (1993) and The Fighting Temptations (2003). Since May 2016, she has been the host of Get Up! Mornings with Erica Campbell with comedian Griff, currently distributed by Reach Media, the syndication arm of Urban One.

== Early life ==
Campbell was born Erica Monique Atkins, on April 29, 1972, in Inglewood, California, the daughter of Eddie Aaron Atkins Jr. (1948–2013), originally from Merced, California, a pastor and minister, and Thomasina Andrea "Honey" Atkins (née Daniels), who is originally from Stamford, Connecticut. Her paternal grandparents are Eddie Aaron Atkins, Sr. and Lavada Cruthird, and her maternal grandparents are Tommy and Ruth Daniels. She had two older brothers, Andre Lavelle Atkins, who died at 6 years old from a combination of Down Syndrome, spinal meningitis, and a hole in his heart, while her other brother is living in Arizona, Darrell Antoine Atkins. She has one older sister, Maliea Dionne Atkins, and five younger sisters, Trecina Evette "Tina" Atkins, Delisa Marie "Lisa" or "Wittle Wees" Atkins, Thomasina Andrea "Goo Goo" Atkins, Alana Ellesse "Lainz" or "Luv Luv" Atkins, and Shanta Nena Lavea Atkins.

== Music career ==
Her music career started in 1998, with her younger sister, Tina Campbell, who formed half of the gospel music duo, Mary Mary. As part of Mary Mary, Campbell earned numerous Stellar Music and Dove Awards, four Grammy Awards, three NAACP Image Awards, two American Music Awards, a Soul Train Award and a BET Award. In 2008, Campbell recorded a solo track called "Stand" for the soundtrack to the independent film A Good Man Is Hard to Find. In 2011, Mary Mary received the ASCAP Golden Note Award for their extraordinary songwriting. Erica commenced her solo music recording career in 2013, by recording her first studio album, HELP, that released on March 25, 2014, with Entertainment One Music. This album was her breakthrough release upon the Billboard magazine charts, while it charted on The Billboard 200, Top Gospel Albums, and Independent Albums charts, where it peaked at Nos. 6, 1, and 2, correspondingly. Campbell won a Grammy Award for Best Gospel Album at the 57th edition of the event. The subsequent studio album, Help 2.0, was released on March 31, 2015, from Entertainment One Music. This album charted on the same charts, but at Nos. 120, 1, and 12, respectively.

In early April 2018, Erica and her husband Warryn Campbell are to star in their own reality show on TV One. The show will highlight Erica going back in the studio to record her new album. Also in 2018, Erica and her husband released a music video titled, "All of My Life".

On September 23, 2022, Erica released “Positive” and she released “Feel Alright (Blessed)” on January 13, 2023, from her second album I Love You, which was released later that year.

== Personal life ==
In 2001, she married Warryn Campbell. The couple resides in Los Angeles together, with their three children.

Campbell is an honorary member of Alpha Kappa Alpha, having been initiated on January 15, 2023.

== Discography ==
=== Studio albums ===
List of studio albums, with selected chart positions
Title	Album details	Peak chart positions		
Title	Album details	US	US Gos	US Ind
Help	Released: March 25, 2014; Label: Entertainment One; CD, digital download	6	1	2
Help 2.0	Released: March 31, 2015 (reissue); Label: Entertainment One; CD, digital download	120	1	12
I Love You	Released: September 15, 2023; Label: My Block Inc; CD, digital download	—	1	—

=== Singles ===
Year	Title	Chart position	Album
Year	Title	US Gospel	Album
2013	"A Little More Jesus"	7	Help
2014	"Help" (featuring Lecrae)	2	Help
2014	"You Are"	17	Help
2014	"P.O.G."	24	Help
2015	"More Love"	18	Help 2.0
2015	"I Luh God" (featuring Big Shizz)	1	Help 2.0
2017	"Well Done"	10	Non-album single
2018	"All of My Life" (with Warryn Campbell)	3	Non-album single
2022	"Positive"	13	I Love You
2023	"Feel Alright (Blessed)"	9	I Love You
2025	"Trust And Obey"	—	I Love You

== Awards and nominations ==
=== American Music Awards ===
Year	Category	Work	Result
2001	Favorite R&B/Soul or Hip-Hop New Artist	Mary Mary	Nominated
2005	Favorite Contemporary Inspirational Artist	Mary Mary	Won
2009	Favorite Contemporary Inspirational Artist	Mary Mary	Won
2009	Favorite Soul/R&B Band, Duo or Group	Mary Mary	Nominated
2014	Favorite Gospel Artist	Mary Mary	Nominated

=== Billboard Music Awards ===
Year	Category	Work	Result
2016	Top Gospel Song	"I Luh God" (with Big Shizz)	Nominated

=== BET Awards ===
The BET Awards are awarded annually by the Black Entertainment Television network. Campbell has received 3 awards from 17 nominations.

Year	Category	Work	Result
2001	Best Female Group	Mary Mary	Nominated
2001	Best Gospel Artist	Mary Mary	Nominated
2003	Best Group	Mary Mary	Nominated
2006	Best Group	Mary Mary	Nominated
2006	Best Gospel Artist	Mary Mary	Nominated
2007	Best Gospel Artist	Mary Mary	Nominated
2007	Best Group	Mary Mary	Nominated
2009	Best Gospel Artist	Mary Mary	Won
2011	Best Gospel Artist	Mary Mary	Won
2013	Best Gospel Artist	Mary Mary	Won
2013	Best Artist	Mary Mary	Nominated
2014	Best Gospel Artist	Herself	Nominated
2015	Best Gospel Artist	Herself	Nominated
2016	Best Gospel Artist	Herself	Nominated
2019	Dr. Bobby Jones Best Gospel/Inspirational Award	"All of My Life" (with Warryn Campbell)	Nominated
2020	Dr. Bobby Jones Best Gospel/Inspirational Award	"All In His Plan" (with PJ Morton and Le'Andria Johnson)	Nominated
2024	Dr. Bobby Jones Best Gospel/Inspirational Award	"Do You Believe in Love?"	Nominated

=== GMA Dove Awards ===
The Dove Awards are awarded annually by the Gospel Music Association. Campbell has won 8 awards from 20 nominations.

Year	Category	Work	Result
2001	Urban Recorded Song of the Year	"Shackles (Praise You)"	Won
2001	Urban Album of the Year	Thankful	Won
2002	Urban Recorded Song of the Year	"Thank You" (with Kirk Franklin)	Won
2003	Contemporary Gospel Recorded Song of the Year	"In the Morning"	Won
2004	Urban Recorded Song of the Year	"Dance, Dance, Dance"	Won
2006	Contemporary Gospel Album of the Year	Mary Mary	Won
2009	Urban Recorded Song of the Year	"Get Up"	Won
2009	Urban Recorded Song of the Year	"Love Him Like I Do"	Nominated
2009	Contemporary Gospel Album of the Year	The Sound	Nominated
2009	Group of the Year	Mary Mary	Nominated
2010	Artist of the Year	Mary Mary	Nominated
2012	Urban Album of the Year	Something Big	Nominated
2013	Contemporary Gospel/Urban Recorded Song of the Year	"Go Get It"	Nominated
2014	Gospel Performance of the Year	"Help" (with Lecrae)	Nominated
2014	Contemporary Gospel/Urban Recorded Song of the Year	"Help" (with Lecrae)	Nominated
2014	Contemporary Gospel/Urban Album	Help	Nominated
2014	Traditional Gospel Recorded Song of the Year	"A Little More Jesus"	Won
2015	Gospel Artist of the Year	Herself	Nominated
2020	Traditional Gospel Recorded Song of the Year	"All In His Plan" (with PJ Morton and Le'Andria Johnson)	Nominated
2024	Contemporary Gospel Album of the Year	I Love You	Nominated
2025	Gospel Worship Recorded Song of the Year	"One Hallelujah" (with Tasha Cobbs Leonard, Israel Houghton, Jonathan McReynolds, and Jekalyn Carr)	Nominated

=== Grammy Awards ===
The Grammy Awards are awarded annually by the National Academy of Recording Arts and Sciences. Campbell has won 6 awards from 18 nominations.

Year	Category	Work	Result
2001	Best Contemporary Soul Gospel Album	Thankful	Won
2006	Best Contemporary Soul Gospel Album	Mary Mary	Nominated
2006	Best Gospel Song	"Heaven"	Nominated
2009	Best Gospel Song	"Get Up"	Nominated
2009	Best Gospel Performance	"Get Up"	Won
2009	Best Contemporary R&B Gospel Album	The Sound	Nominated
2010	Best Gospel Song	"God In Me"	Won
2012	Best Gospel Song	"Sitting With Me"	Nominated
2012	Best Gospel Album	Something Big	Nominated
2013	Best Gospel Song	"Go Get It"	Won
2013	Best Gospel/Contemporary Christian Music Performance	"Go Get It"	Nominated
2014	Best Gospel Song	"A Little More Jesus"	Nominated
2015	Best Gospel Album	HELP	Won
2015	Best Gospel Performance/Song	"HELP"	Nominated
2023	Best Gospel Performance/Song	"Positive"	Nominated
2024	Best Gospel Performance/Song	"Feel Alright (Blessed)"	Nominated
2024	Best Gospel Album	I Love You	Nominated
2025	Best Gospel Performance/Song	"One Hallelujah"	Won

=== NAACP Image Awards ===
The NAACP Image Awards are awarded annually by the National Association for the Advancement of Colored People (NAACP). Campbell has won 5 awards from 11 nominations.

Year	Category	Work	Result
2001	Outstanding Duo or Group	Mary Mary	Nominated
2003	Outstanding Duo or Group	Mary Mary	Nominated
2003	Outstanding Gospel Artist	Mary Mary	Nominated
2006	Outstanding Gospel Artist	Mary Mary	Nominated
2009	Outstanding Gospel Artist	Mary Mary	Won
2010	Outstanding Song	"God In Me"	Won
2012	Outstanding Gospel Album (Traditional or Contemporary)	Something Big	Nominated
2013	Outstanding Gospel Album (Traditional or Contemporary)	GO GET IT	Won
2013	Duo, Group or Collaboration	Themselves	Won
2017	Outstanding Reality Program/Reality Competition Series	Mary Mary	Nominated
2023	Outstanding Gospel/Christian Song	"Positive"	Won

=== Soul Train Awards ===
The Soul Train Music Awards and Soul Train Lady of Soul Awards are awarded annually. Campbell has received a total of 5 awards from 15 nominations.

Year	Category	Work	Result
Soul Train Awards
2001	Best Gospel Album	Thankful	Nominated
2009	Best Gospel Performance	"God In Me"	Won
2009	Best Collaboration	"God In Me"	Nominated
2009	Song of the Year	"God In Me"	Nominated
2011	Best Gospel Performance	"Walking"	Won
2011	Best Dance Performance	"Walking"	Nominated
2014	Best Gospel/Inspirational Song	"Help" (with Lecrae)	Won
2015	Best Gospel/Inspirational Song	"More Love"	Nominated
2019	Best Gospel/Inspirational Award	Herself	Nominated
2022	Best Gospel/Inspirational Award	Herself	Nominated
2024	Best Gospel/Inspirational Award	"Feel Alright (Blessed)"	Nominated
Soul Train Lady of Soul Awards
2001	Best Gospel Album	Thankful	Won
2001	Best R&B/Soul or Rap New Duo or Group	Mary Mary	Won
2001	Best R&B/Soul Single Duo or Group	"Shackles (Praise You)"	Nominated
2003	Best Gospel Album	Incredible	Nominated

=== Stellar Awards ===
The Stellar Awards are awarded annually by SAGMA. Campbell has received 27 awards from 57 nominations.

Year	Category	Work	Result
2001	New Artist of the Year	Mary Mary	Won
2001	Group/Duo of the Year	Mary Mary	Won
2001	Contemporary Group/Duo of the Year	Mary Mary	Won
2001	Artist of the Year	Mary Mary	Nominated
2001	Contemporary CD of the Year	Thankful	Won
2001	Music Video of the Year	"Shackles (Praise You)"	Nominated
2004	Contemporary Group/Duo of the Year	Mary Mary	Won
2004	Artist of the Year	Mary Mary	Nominated
2004	Group Duo of the Year	Mary Mary	Nominated
2004	Urban/Inspirational Performance of the Year	"Incredible"	Nominated
2006	Urban/Inspirational Single / Performance of the Year	"Heaven"; Mary Mary	Won
2006	CD Of The Year	Mary Mary	Nominated
2006	Artist Of The Year	Mary Mary	Nominated
2006	Group Duo of the Year	Mary Mary	Nominated
2006	Song of the Year	"Heaven"	Nominated
2010	Song of the Year	Mary Mary	Won
2010	Group/Duo of the Year	Mary Mary	Won
2010	Contemporary Group/Duo of the Year	Mary Mary	Won
2010	Urban/Inspirational Single / Performance of the Year	"God In Me"	Won
2012	Group/Duo of the Year	Themselves	Won
2012	Contemporary Group/Duo of the Year	Themselves	Won
2012	Artist of the Year	Themselves	Nominated
2012	CD of the Year	Something Big	Nominated
2012	Contemporary CD of the Year	Something Big	Nominated
2012	Urban/Inspirational Performance of the Year	"Walking"	Nominated
2013	Urban/Inspirational Single / Performance of the Year	"Go Get It"	Won
2013	Song of the Year	"Go Get It"	Nominated
2013	Group/Duo of the Year	Mary Mary	Won
2013	Special Event CD of the Year	Mary Mary	Won
2013	Contemporary Group/Duo of the Year	Mary Mary	Won
2013	Contemporary CD of the Year	Go Get It	Won
2015	Albertina Walker Female Vocalist of the Year	Help	Won
2015	Artist of the Year	Help	Won
2015	Album of the Year	Help	Won
2015	Contemporary Album of the Year	Help	Won
2015	Contemporary Female Vocalist of the Year	Help	Won
2015	Producer of the Year	Help	Won
2015	Recorded Music Packaging of the Year	Help	Won
2015	Song of the Year	"Help"(with Lecrae)	Nominated
2015	Music Video of the Year	"Help"(with Lecrae)	Nominated
2015	Urban/Inspirational Single or Performance of the Year	"Help"(with Lecrae)	Won
2016	Artist of the Year	Help 2.0	Nominated
2016	Albertina Walker Female Vocalist of the Year	Help 2.0	Nominated
2016	Contemporary Female Vocalist of the Year	Help 2.0	Nominated
2016	Album of the Year	Help 2.0	Nominated
2016	Contemporary Album of the Year	Help 2.0	Nominated
2016	Urban/Inspirational Single or Performance of the Year	"I Luh God"	Nominated
2021	Song of the Year	"All In His Plan" (with PJ Morton and Le'Andria Johnson)	Nominated
2022	Gospel Announcer of the Year	Get Up! Mornings With Erica Campbell	Nominated
2023	Song of the Year	"Positive"	Nominated
2024	Artist of the Year	I Love You	Nominated
2024	Albertina Walker Female Vocalist of the Year	I Love You	Nominated
2024	Contemporary Album of the Year	I Love You	Nominated
2024	Song of the Year	"Feel Alright (Blessed)"	Nominated
2024	Urban/Inspirational Single or Performance of the Year	"Feel Alright (Blessed)"	Nominated
2024	Syndicated Gospel Radio Show of the Year	Get Up! Mornings With Erica Campbell (with Arlen "Griff" Griffin)	Won
2025	Syndicated Gospel Radio Show of the Year	Get Up! Mornings With Erica Campbell (with Arlen "Griff" Griffin and Cheryl Jackson)	Won
2026	Song of the Year	"On the Way" (with Adia)	Nominated
2026	Music Video of the Year	"On the Way" (with Adia)	Nominated
2026	Urban Single or Performance of the Year	"On the Way" (with Adia)	Won
2026	Contemporary Female Artist of the Year	Herself	Won
2026	Syndicated Gospel Radio Show of the Year	Get Up! Mornings with Erica Campbell	Won

=== Miscellaneous honors ===
Year	Organization	Award	Nominated work	Result
2025	Missouri Gospel Music Hall of Fame		Herself	Inducted
