= Anthony Brown (gospel musician) =

American gospel musician

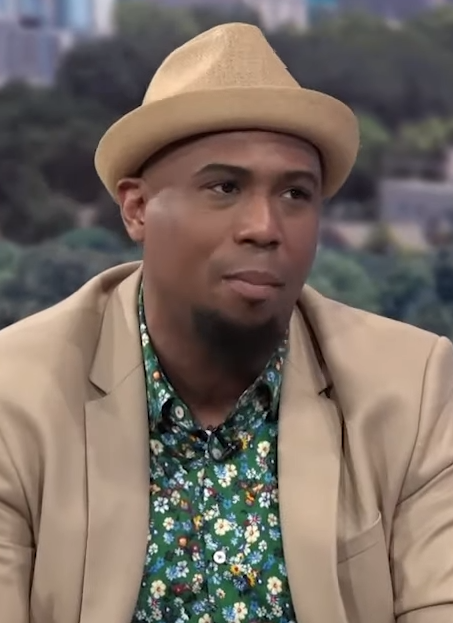
- Brown in 2019

Background information
- Born: Anthony Jamar Brown; October 22, 1981 (age 45); Baltimore
- Origin: Baltimore, Maryland
- Genres: Gospel, black gospel, urban contemporary gospel
- Occupations: Singer, songwriter
- Instruments: Vocals, singer-songwriter
- Years active: 2012–present
- Label: Tyscot
- Website: ajblive.com

Anthony Jamar Brown (born October 22, 1981 in Baltimore, Maryland, U.S) is an American urban contemporary gospel songwriter, singer and pianist, whose background singers are Group Therapy, stylized group therAPy. In 2012, his major label debut record, Anthony Brown & Group TherAPy, was released on Tyscot Records. This was a Billboard breakthrough release, with chartings The Billboard 200, the Top Gospel Albums, and the Independent Albums chart. He is the worship leader at First Baptist Church of Glenarden, located in Upper Marlboro, Maryland, where he has served since June 2008.

== Early life ==
Brown was born on October 22, 1981. In 2008, he became Assistant Minister of Music at First Baptist Church of Glenarden, located in Upper Marlboro, Maryland, and later worship leader.

== Music career ==
His music career got started in 2012, with the release of Anthony Brown & Group TherAPy, that released on August 21, 2012, by Tyscot Records. It was produced by Brown and Justin Savage. The album was the breakthrough release on the Billboard charts, having placements at No. 130 on The Billboard 200, No. 3 on the Gospel Albums, and at No. 19 on the Independent Albums chart. Andy Kellman, specifying in a review by AllMusic, recognizes, "Brown puts his vocal-arrangement chops on full display throughout this contemporary gospel set, which bursts with uplifting spirit." Peggy Oliver, indicating in a highly recommended review at Soul Tracks, realizes, "Brown & group therAPy’s debut still invokes a fresh and joyous spirit." The capitalized AP, references his former group, Answered Prayers.

== Members ==
- Group TherAPy
  - Doretha Sampson
  - Shirley Daley
  - Ashia Bello
  - Nicole Wilson
  - Cherlita Claiborne
  - Martellies Warren
  - Gabriel Hansborough
  - Javan Bowden

== Discography ==
List of studio albums, with selected chart positions
Title	Album details	Peak chart positions		
Title	Album details	US	US Gos	US Indie
Anthony Brown & Group TherAPy	Released: August 21, 2012; Label: Tyscot; Formats: CD, digital download	130	3	19
Everyday Jesus	Released: July 17, 2015; Label: Tyscot; Formats: CD, digital download	11	1	3
A Long Way from Sunday	Released: July 28, 2017; Label: Tyscot; Formats: CD, digital download	117	1	—
2econd Wind: Ready	Released: October 18, 2019; Label: Tyscot; Formats: CD, digital download	—	—	—
Stuck in the House	Released: November 6, 2020; Label: Tyscot; Formats: CD, digital download	—	—	—
Affirmations	Released: November 3, 2023; Label: Tyscot; Formats: CD, digital download	—	—	—
