= WOW Gospel 2014 =

Compilation album by Various Artists
- Released: February 4, 2014
- Genre: CCM, gospel, urban contemporary gospel, praise & worship, alternative CCM, Christian hip hop, traditional black gospel, southern gospel
- Length: 143:09
- Label: Motown Gospel, RCA Inspiration, Word, Curb
- Producer: Percy Bady, Myron Butler, Warryn Campbell, Kurt Carr, Derek "DC" Clark, Philip Feaster, Kirk Franklin, Calvin Frazier, Gawvi, Fred Hammond, Luther "Mano" Hanes, Hart Academy, Marvin "Tony" Hemmings, Lucius B. Hoskins, Israel Houghton, Rodney "Darkchild" Jerkins, Donald Lawrence, AyRon Lewis, Aaron Lindsey, Shaun Martin, William McDowell, VaShawn Mitchell, Jason Nelson, Jonathan Nelson, Rick Robinson, Calvin Rogers, Harmony Samuels, Dana Sorey, Bobby Sparks, Tye Tribbett, Asaph Ward, Daniel Weatherspoon

Various Artists chronology
WOW Gospel 2013 (2013)	WOW Gospel 2014 (2014)	WOW Gospel 2015 (2015)

WOW Gospel 2014 is the seventeenth album in the WOW Gospel series. Motown Gospel, RCA Inspiration, Word Records, and Curb Records released the album on February 4, 2014. The album has sold 116,000 copies in the US as of February 2015.

== Track listing ==
Disc 1
No.	Title	Writer(s)	Featured artist	Length
1.	"Every Praise"	John David Bratton, Hezekiah Walker	Hezekiah Walker	4:48
2.	"Greatest Man"	Steven McCoy, VaShawn Mitchell	VaShawn Mitchell	7:47
3.	"Nothing Without You"	Jason Nelson, Tonya Nelson, Dana Sorey	Jason Nelson	4:30
4.	"Withholding Nothing"	William McDowell	William McDowell	4:39
5.	"I Win"	Joshua Lay, Brittney Wright	Marvin Sapp	4:04
6.	"Break Every Chain"	William Reagan	Tasha Cobbs	4:14
7.	"We Are Not Ashamed"	Andraé Crouch	Andraé Crouch	3:04
8.	"You Reign"	William Murphy, Miah White	William Murphy	6:17
9.	"Finish Strong (Strong Finish)"	Jonathan Nelson, Kenneth Shelton	Jonathan Nelson & Purpose	5:04
10.	"Worthy Is Your Name"	Anita Wilson	Charles Jenkins & Fellowship Chicago	5:13
11.	"Your Best Days Yet"	Donald Lawrence	Paul S. Morton	5:06
12.	"Still Able"	Cheryl Fortune, James Fortune, AyRon Lewis	James Fortune & FIYA	5:19
13.	"I've Seen Him Do It"	Kurt Carr	Kurt Carr Singers	4:56
14.	"Good God"	Kurt Carr	Shirley Caesar	5:54
15.	"A Little More Jesus"	Erica Campbell, Tina Campbell, Warryn Campbell	Erica Campbell	4:00

Disc 2
No.	Title	Writer(s)	Featured artist	Length
1.	"A God Like You"	Kirk Franklin, Shaun Martin, Bobby Sparks	Kirk Franklin	6:18
2.	"If He Did It Before (Same God)"	Tye Tribbett	Tye Tribbett	4:05
3.	"Go Get It"	E. Campbell, T. Campbell, W. Campbell	Mary Mary	3:13
4.	"Sunday Kinda Love"	Israel Houghton, Aaron Lindsey	Israel Houghton, Aaron Lindsey, PJ Morton, Nikki Ross	4:28
5.	"Tell the World"	Charles Dunlap, Torrance "Street Symphony" Esmond, Lecrae Moore, Lincoln Morris, Kortney Pollard	Lecrae, Mali Music	3:38
6.	"Trumpet Blows"	Rodney "Darkchild" Jerkins, Tiyon Mack	Kierra Sheard	4:24
7.	"You Will"	Gabriel Azucena, Kameron Glasper, Andy Mineo	Andy Mineo	4:09
8.	"Have Your Way"	Calvin Frazier, Deitrick Haddon	Deitrick Haddon	4:39
9.	"1 on 1"	Lucius B. Hoskins, Ike Jenkins, Fred Sanders	Zacardi Cortez	4:09
10.	"Here in Our Praise"	Michael Bethany, Derek "DC" Clark, Fred Hammond	Fred Hammond	4:22
11.	"Our God"	Jonas Myrin, Matt Redman, Jesse Reeves, Chris Tomlin	Micah Stampley	4:41
12.	"If We Had Your Eyes"	Courtney Harrell, Al Sherrod Lambert, Harmony Samuels	Michelle Williams	4:35
13.	"Faith to Believe"	Stacey Joseph, Justin Savage	Sheri Jones-Moffett	4:32
14.	"The Gift"	Lawrence	Donald Lawrence	5:11
15.	"Keep Doing What You're Doing"	Rick Robinson, A. Wilson,	Anita Wilson	5:53

== Charts ==
Chart (2014)	Peak position
US Billboard 200	26
US Top Gospel Albums (Billboard)	1
