= WOW Gospel 2015 =

Compilation album by Various Artists
- Released: February 3, 2015
- Genre: CCM, gospel, urban contemporary gospel, praise & worship, alternative CCM, Christian hip hop, traditional black gospel, southern gospel
- Length: 143:02
- Label: Motown Gospel, RCA Inspiration, Word, Curb
- Producer: Paul D. Allen; Michael Bereal; Clay Bogan III; James Burney; Warryn Campbell; Kurt Carr; Eric Davis; Dirty Rice; Kirk Franklin; J.J. Hairston; Fred Hammond; Israel Houghton; Donald Lawrence; Aaron Lindsey; Shaun Martin; Donnie McClurkin; William McDowell; VaShawn Mitchell; J Moss; Ken Pennell; Kortney Pollard; Joseph Prielozny; James Roberson; Rick Robinson; Bryant Siono; Dana Sorey; Max Stark; Christopher Stevens; Mike Taylor; Tye Tribbett; Terence Vaughn; Asaph Ward; Daniel Weatherspoon; Joe "Flip" Wilson

Various Artists chronology
WOW Gospel 2014 (2014)	WOW Gospel 2015 (2015)	WOW Gospel 2016 (2016)

WOW Gospel 2015 is the seventeenth album in the WOW Gospel series. Motown Gospel, RCA Inspiration, Word Records, and Curb Records released the album on February 3, 2015.

== Track listing ==
Disc 1
No.	Title	Writer(s)	Featured artist	Length
1.	"Perfect People"	Kirk Franklin	The Walls Group	3:50
2.	"Give Me"	Franklin	Kirk Franklin, Mali Music	6:28
3.	"All I Need Is You"	Dustin "Dab" Bowie, Kenneth Chris Mackey, Lecrae Moore, Joseph Prielozny, Latasha Williams	Lecrae	3:44
4.	"Beautiful Day"	Morgan Harper-Nichols, Jamie Grace Harper, Toby McKeehan, Christopher Stevens	Jamie Grace, tobyMac	3:11
5.	"You Are"	Erica Campbell, Warryn Campbell	Erica Campbell	4:45
6.	"You Love Me (Best of My Love)"	Al McKay, Maurice White	Anita Wilson	4:13
7.	"Worth Fighting For"	Aaron Lindsey, Brian Courtney Wilson	Brian Courtney Wilson	6:48
8.	"No Greater Love"	Lindsey, Smokie Norful	Smokie Norful	4:33
9.	"I Can Only Imagine"	Israel Houghton, Meleasa Houghton, Bart Millard	Tamela Mann	5:37
10.	"Live Through It"	Cheryl Fortune, James Fortune, Terence Vaughn	James Fortune & FIYA	5:22
11.	"I Believe"	Kortney Pollard	Mali Music	3:54
12.	"2nd Win"	Justin Brooks, Lakeisha Burns, J. Drew Sheard, Kierra Sheard, Elbernita Clark Terrell	Kierra Sheard	2:57
13.	"Here Right Now"	Franklin	Tasha Page-Lockhart	3:34
14.	"Alright OK"	Paul D. Allen, James L. Moss	J. Moss	3:30
15.	"I Will Lift Him Up"	Fred Hammond, King Logan	Fred Hammond	5:19

Disc 2
No.	Title	Writer(s)	Featured artist	Length
1.	"He Turned It"	Tye Tribbett	Tye Tribbett	5:00
2.	"It Pushed Me"	Eric Davis, J.J. Hairston	J.J. Hairston & Youthful Praise	4:28
3.	"Dominion"	Percy Bady, Jonathan Ball	Jason Nelson	5:55
4.	"Can't Live Without You"	William McDowell	Nicole Binton, William McDowell	5:22
5.	"Deeper"	Darius Paulk	Marvin Sapp	6:24
6.	"It's Working"	Rodney Edge, Lindsey, William Murphy	William Murphy	4:42
7.	"Amazing"	Tiffany McGhee	Ricky Dillard & New G	5:26
8.	"God My God"	VaShawn Mitchell	VaShawn Mitchell	4:45
9.	"For Your Glory"	Mia Booker	Tasha Cobbs	4:13
10.	"Best For Last"	Donald Lawrence	Yolanda Adams, Donald Lawrence & Co.	5:17
11.	"Come As You Are"	I. Houghton, M. Houghton, Donnie McClurkin	Israel Houghton, Donnie McClurkin, New Breed	5:49
12.	"I Feel Your Spirit"	Sheri Jones-Moffett, Daniel Moore	Hezekiah Walker	4:35
13.	"We Are Victorious"	Donnie McClurkin	Tye Tribbett	5:08
14.	"We've Gotta Put Jesus Back"	Kurt Carr	Kurt Carr Singers	4:13
15.	"Sweeping Through the City"	James Herndon	Beverly Crawford	4:00

== Charts ==
Chart (2015)	Peak position
US Billboard 200	64
US Top Gospel Albums (Billboard)	1
