= WOW Gospel 2013 =

Compilation album by Various Artists
- Released: January 29, 2013
- Genre: Contemporary Christian music, Gospel
- Length: 2:13:30
- Label: Verity Records
- Producer: Various

Various Artists chronology
WOW Gospel 2012 (2012)	WOW Gospel 2013 (2013)	WOW Gospel 2014 (2014)

Professional ratings
Review scores
Source	Rating
Allmusic	4/5 stars

WOW Gospel 2013 is a gospel music compilation album from the award-winning WOW series. Released on January 29, 2013, the double CD album features thirty contemporary gospel hits. The album cover pay tribute to Atlanta, Georgia, making it the second WOW Gospel album to do so (WOW Gospel 2007 is the first). This second Atlanta tribute is based on the 50th anniversary of the March on Washington for Jobs and Freedom and the "I Have a Dream" speech by Martin Luther King Jr. The album topped out at #1 on the Billboard Gospel Albums chart and #43 on the Billboard 200 chart.

== Track listing ==
=== Disc one ===
1. I Smile - Kirk Franklin - 4:58
2. Testimony - Anthony Brown and group therAPy - 4:18
3. Hold On - James Fortune and Fiyah featuring Monica and Fred Hammond - 5:18
4. It's Not Over (When God's In It) - Israel and New Breed - 6:13
5. Turning Around for Me - VaShawn Mitchell - 4:55
6. Chances - Isaac Carree - 4:22
7. Good and Bad - J. Moss - 4:51
8. Indescribable - Kierra Sheard - 6:18
9. Every Moment - forever JONES - 3:46
10. Once In A Lifetime - Smokie Norful - 4:01
11. Happy - Tasha Cobbs - 5:47
12. I Feel Good - Fred Hammond - 4:15
13. Never Wanna Let You Go - The Walls Group - 5:02
14. Something Out Of Nothing - Jessica Reedy - 3:38
15. God Is On Our Side - Andrae Crouch - 2:04
16. Keep Dreaming - Dominique Jones - 4:38

=== Disc two ===
1. He Turned It - Ricky Dillard & New G - 4:35
2. After This - J.J. Hairston and Youthful Praise - 4:35
3. Awesome - Pastor Charles Jenkins and Fellowship Chicago - 5:49
4. My Worship - John P. Kee - 5:30
5. Great & Mighty - Byron Cage - 4:47
6. My Testimony - Marvin Sapp - 5:19
7. Shifting the Atmosphere - Jason Nelson - 4:55
8. Not My Own - Myron Butler and Tasha Cobbs - 5:28
9. Keep Me - Patrick Dopson - 4:55
10. Spiritual - Donald Lawrence and Company - 4:14
11. All About You - Anita Wilson - 4:38
12. Stretch - Tamela Mann - 4:08
13. Sow in Tears - Richard Smallwood and Vision - 6:05
14. I Won’t Go Back - William McDowell - 4:15

=== Deluxe edition bonus tracks (digital download only) ===
1. You Are My God And King - Donnie McClurkin - 5:23
2. Shine - Sheri Jones-Moffett - 4:36
3. I Love You - Jonathan McReynolds - 3:27
4. Majesty - Deon Kipping, Jason Nelson & William Murphy - 6:04
5. Jesus Is Coming - Deitrick Haddon - 2:41
6. I Don't Look Like (What I've Been Through) - Deon Kipping - 5:33
