= WOW Gospel 2016 =

Compilation album by Various Artists
- Released: January 29, 2016
- Genre: CCM, gospel, urban contemporary gospel, praise & worship, alternative CCM, traditional black gospel
- Length: 137:39
- Label: Motown Gospel, RCA Inspiration, Word, Curb

Various Artists chronology
WOW Gospel 2015 (2015)	WOW Gospel 2016 (2016)	WOW Gospel 2017 (2017)

WOW Gospel 2016 is the eighteenth album in the WOW Gospel series. Motown Gospel, RCA Inspiration, Word Records, and Curb Records released the album on January 29, 2016.

== Track list ==
Disc 1
No.	Title	Featured artist	Length
1.	"Before I Die"	Kirk Franklin	4:22
2.	"Bless the Lord"	Anthony Brown & group therAPy	5:52
3.	"Immediately"	Tasha Cobbs	5:05
4.	"I Am" (WOW Edit)	Jason Nelson	6:31
5.	"Fill Me Up"	Casey J	4:20
6.	"This Place"	Tamela Mann	5:12
7.	"Fix Me"	Tim Bowman Jr.	4:39
8.	"Different"	Tasha Page-Lockhart	3:56
9.	"Help"	Erica Campbell	4:58
10.	"Gotta Have You"	Jonathan McReynolds	2:56
11.	"Nobody"	Tye Tribbett	5:35
12.	"Intentional" (Radio Edit)	Travis Greene	4:24
13.	"It Will Be Alright"	Brian Courtney Wilson	5:37
14.	"Kingdom"	Geoffrey Golden	5:22
15.	"Love on the Radio"	The Walls Group	3:33

Disc 2
No.	Title	Featured artist	Length
1.	"Level Next"	John P. Kee	3:53
2.	"Great God Great Praise"	Kurt Carr & The Kurt Carr Singers	5:27
3.	"My Words Have Power"	Karen Clark Sheard	4:41
4.	"Grace"	Ricky Dillard & New G	4:40
5.	"Amazing" (WOW Edit)	Hezekiah Walker	4:19
6.	"I Will Trust"	Fred Hammond	4:34
7.	"How Awesome Is Our God" (Radio Edit)	Israel & New Breed	4:27
8.	"I Need a Word"	Smokie Norful	4:04
9.	"Yes You Can" (Radio Edit)	Marvin Sapp	4:17
10.	"I'm Still Here"	Donnie McClurkin	3:47
11.	"Already Getting Better"	William Murphy	4:04
12.	"King Oh King"	Maurette Brown Clark	3:51
13.	"Same God" (Radio Edit)	Richard Smallwood	3:05
14.	"Nobody Like Our God"	Myron Butler	4:57
15.	"Holding On"	VaShawn Mitchell	5:54
Total length:			137:39

== Charts ==
Chart (2016)	Peak position
US Billboard 200	90
US Top Gospel Albums (Billboard)	1
