= 46th GMA Dove Awards =

2015 US music awards ceremony

- Date: October 13, 2015
- Location: Allen Arena, Nashville, Tennessee, U.S.
- Hosted by: Erica Campbell and Sadie Robertson
- Website: http://www.doveawards.com

Television/radio coverage
- Network: TBN (October 18, 2015)

The 46th Annual GMA Dove Awards presentation ceremony was held on Tuesday, October 13, 2015, at the Allen Arena in Nashville, Tennessee. The ceremony recognized the accomplishments of musicians and other figures within the Christian music industry for the year 2014. The ceremony was produced by the Trinity Broadcasting Network and was hosted by musician Erica Campbell and television star Sadie Robertson. The awards show was broadcast on the Trinity Broadcasting Network on October 18, 2015.

== Performers ==
The following were some of the musical artists who performed at the 46th GMA Dove Awards:

- Casting Crowns
- Lauren Daigle
- Matt Maher
- MercyMe
- Danny Gokey
- Tedashii
- I Am They
- Big Daddy Weave
- Kirk Franklin
- Brian Courtney Wilson
- Crowder
- The Erwins
- Joseph Habedank
- Israel Houghton

== Presenters ==
The following were some of the presenters who presented at the 46th GMA Dove Awards:

- Lincoln Brewster
- Jason Crabb
- Bone Hampton
- Charles Jenkins
- Dr. Bobby Jones
- Mark Lowry
- Chonda Pierce
- The Newsboys', Michael Tait and Duncan Phillips
- Kari Jobe
- Michelle Williams
- Michael W. Smith

== Nominees and winners ==
This is a complete list of the nominees for the 46th GMA Dove Awards. The winners are in bold.

=== General ===
Song of the Year

- "Overwhelmed" – Big Daddy Weave
  - Writers: Michael Weaver, Phil Wickham
- "Thrive" – Casting Crowns
  - Writers: Mark Hall, Matthew West
- "Come As You Are" – Crowder
  - Writers: Ben Glover, David Crowder, Matt Maher
- "Hope in Front Of Me" – Danny Gokey
  - Writers: Bernie Herms, Brett James, Danny Gokey Platinum Songs
- "He Knows My Name" – Francesca Battistelli
  - Writers: Francesca Battistelli, Mia Fieldes, Seth Mosley
- **"How Can It Be" – Lauren Daigle**
  - **Writers: Jason Ingram, Jeff Johnson, Paul Mabury**
- "Greater" – MercyMe
  - Writers: Barry Graul, Bart Millard, Ben Glover, David Garcia, Mike Scheuchzer, Nathan Cochran, Robby Shaffer
- "Multiplied" – Needtobreathe
  - Writers: Bear Rinehart, Bo Rinehart
- "We Believe" – Newsboys
  - Writers: Matthew Hooper, Richie Fike, Travis Ryan
- "This Is Amazing Grace" – Phil Wickham
  - Writers: Jeremy Riddle, Josh Farro, Phil Wickham

Songwriter of the Year

- Bart Millard
- Chris Tomlin
- Lecrae Moore
- **Matt Maher**
- Phil Wickham

Songwriter of the Year (Non-artist)

- Benjamin Glover
- David Garcia
- Dianne Wilkinson
- Jason Ingram
- **Seth Mosley**

Contemporary Christian Artist of the Year

- Chris Tomlin, sixstepsrecords/Sparrow Records
- **for KING & COUNTRY, Word Entertainment**
- Hillsong United, Hillsong Church T/A/Sparrow Records
- Lecrae, Reach Records
- MercyMe, Fair Trade Services

Southern Gospel Artist of the Year

- Booth Brothers, Spring Hill Music Group
- Collingsworth Family, Stowtown Records
- Ernie Haase & Signature Sound, StowTown Records
- **Gaither Vocal Band, Spring House Music Group**
- The Isaacs, Spring House Music Group

Gospel Artist of the Year

- Erica Campbell, Entertainment One
- Fred Hammond, RCA Records
- Israel & New Breed, RCA Records
- Jonathan McReynolds, Light Records
- Tamela Mann, Tillymann Music Group
- **Tasha Cobbs, Motown Gospel**

Artist of the Year

- for KING & COUNTRY, Fervent Records
- Francesca Battistelli, Fervent Records
- Kari Jobe, Sparrow Records
- **Lecrae, Reach Records**
- MercyMe, Fair Trade Services

New Artist of the Year

- About a Mile, Word Entertainment
- Danny Gokey, BMG Rights Management
- I Am They, Provident Label Group
- **Lauren Daigle, Centricity Music**
- NF, Capitol CMG Label Group

Producer of the Year

- Aaron Lindsey
- Ed Cash
- **Seth Mosley**
- Wayne Haun
- David Garcia and Ben Glover (Team)
- Joseph Prielozny and Chris Mackey (Team)

=== Rap/Hip Hop and Urban ===
Rap/Hip Hop Song of the Year

- "Who You Know" – Derek Minor, (writers) Derek Johnson and Chris Mackey
- "Sideways (ft. Lecrae)" – KB, (writers) Kevin Burgess, Lecrae Moore, Jamal James, Chris Mackey and Joseph Prielozny
- **"All I Need Is You" – Lecrae, (writers) Lecrae Moore, Dustin "Dab" Bowie, Latasha Williams, Chris Mackey and Joseph Prielozny**
- "Mansion" – NF, (writers) Nate Feurstein, Lauren Strahm and David Garcia
- "Volcano (ft. Jonathan Thulin)" – Rapture Ruckus, (writers) Bradley Dring, Joshua Hawkins, Jonathan Thulin

Rap/Hip Hop Album of the Year

- Empire – Derek Minor, (producers) Dirty Rice, Derek Minor, Black Knight, Jonny Grande, Anthony "AntMan Wonder" Reid, Tyshane, Bandplay, G-Roc, Gawvi, Syksense
- Tomorrow We Live – KB, (producers) Swoope, Dirty Rice, Joseph Prielozny, Supe, Kevin Burgess, Mpax, 808xElite, Justin Ebach, De-Capo Music Group for Vakseen LLC
- **Anomaly** – Lecrae, (producers) Dirty Rice, Joseph Prielozny, Street Symphony, S1, J. Rhodes, 808XEliTE, GAWVI, Nate Robinson, Mashell, Derek Minor, Vohnbeatz, Lasanna "Ace" Harris, Alex Medina, Jaquebeatz
- Mansion – NF, (producers) Tommee Profitt, David Garcia
- Rise – Trip Lee, (producers) GAWVI, Jonatan Barahona, Alex Medina

=== Rock ===
Rock Songs of the Year

- "Safety (ft. Stephen Christian)" – Fireflight, (writers) Dawn Michele and Rusty Varenkamp
- "Darkest Part" – Red, (writers) Anthony Armstrong, Michael Barnes, Randy Armstrong, Rob Graves, Josh Baker, Mark Holman
- **"Good To Be Alive" – Skillet, (writers) John L. Cooper, Zac Maloy, Tom Douglas**
- "Furious Love" – VERIDIA, (writers) Brandon Brown, Deena Jakoub, Ian Eskelin, Barry Weeks
- "Dead Man" – We as Human, (writer) Justin Cordle

Rock/Contemporary Song of the Year

- "Fireblazin" – Capital Kings (writers), Cole Walowac, Jonathan White, Neon Feather, David Garcia and Toby Mckeehan
- "Lift Your Head Weary Sinner (Chains)" – Crowder, (writers) Ed Cash, David Crowder, Seth Philpott
- "Messengers (ft. for KING & COUNTRY)" – Lecrae, (writers) Lecrae Moore, Joel Smallbone, Luke Smallbone, Ricky Jackson, Ran Jackson, Chris Mackey, Joseph Prielozny and Torrance Esmono
- **"Brother" – Needtobreathe, (writers) Bear Rinehart and Bo Rinehart**
- "Let It Out" – Switchfoot, (writers) Jon Foreman, Tim Foreman, Andrew Pearson

Rock Album of the Year

- Lowborn – Anberlin, (producer) Anberlin
- Attack – Disciple, (producer) Travis Wyrick
- Fight the Silence – For Today, (producer) Will Putney
- **of Beauty and Rage** – RED, (producer) Rob Graves
- Oxygen: Inhale – Thousand Foot Krutch, (producers) Aaron Sprinkle and Trevor McNevan

Rock/Contemporary Album of the Year

- **Anchor** – Colton Dixon, (producers) David Garcia, Adam Watts, Andy Dodd, Gannin Arnold
- The Borderland Sessions – John Mark McMillan, (producer) Elijah Mosely
- Live from the Woods – Needtobreathe, (producers) NEEDTOBREATHE
- Invader – Rapture Ruckus, (producers) Brad Dring, Geoff Duncan, Steve Aiello
- The Edge of the Earth (EP) – Switchfoot, (producers) Neal Avron, the Foreman Brothers

=== Pop ===
Pop/Contemporary Song of the Year

- "Come As You Are" – Crowder, (writers) David Crowder, Matt Maher, Ben Glover
- "Shoulders" – for KING & COUNTRY, (writers), Luke Smallbone, Joel Smallbone, Ben Glover, Tedd Tjornhom
- "Touch The Sky" – Hillsong United, (writers) Joel Houston, Dylan Thomas and Michael Guy Chislett
- **"How Can It Be" – Lauren Daigle, (writer) Paul Mabury, Jason Ingram, Jeff Johnson**
- "We Believe" – Newsboys, (writers) Travis Ryan, Richie Fike, Matt Hooper
- "Soul On Fire" – Third Day, (writers), Mac Powell, Tai Anderson, David Carr, Mark Lee, Brenton Brown, Matt Maher

Pop/Contemporary Album of the Year

- Love Ran Red – Chris Tomlin, (producer) Ed Cash
- Neon Steeple – Crowder, (producers) David Crowder, Gabe Scott, Solomon Olds, Ed Cash, Christopher Stevens, Christian Paschall, Will Hunt, Jared Fox
- **Run Wild. Live Free. Love Strong.** – for KING & COUNTRY, (producers) Seth Mosley, Tedd T., Matt Hales, Ben Glover
- How Can It Be – Lauren Daigle, (producers) Paul Mabury and Jason Ingram
- Saints and Sinners – Matt Maher, (producers) Paul Moak, Matt Maher, Ed Cash, Jason Ingram
- Lead Us Back: Songs of Worship – Third Day, (producers) The Sound Kids, Third Day

=== Inspirational ===
Inspirational Song of the Year

- "Ghost Town (Freedom)" – David Phelps, (writer) David Phelps
- "This I Believe (The Creed)" – Hillsong Worship, (writers) Matt Crocker, Ben Fielding
- **"O Love Of God" – Laura Story, (writers) Laura Story, Cindy Morgan, Ian Cron**
- "More And More Of You" – Selah (writers) Jennie Lee Riddle, Richie Fike, Jonathan Lee
- "Christ Be All Around Me" – Michael W. Smith, (writers) Leeland Mooring, Jack Mooring, David Leonard, Leslie Jordan

Inspirational Album of the Year

- Be Still and Know – Amy Grant, (producers) Vince Gill, Marshall Altman, Brown Bannister
- Glorious Day: Hymns of Faith – Casting Crowns, (producer) Mark A. Miller
- **Above It All** – Phillips, Craig & Dean, (producers) Seth Mosley, Nathan Nockels
- You Amaze Us – Selah, (producers) Jason Kyle, Todd Smith, Allan Hall, Jordan Mohilowski, Ed Cash
- A Cappella – The Martins, (producers) Michael English, Lari Goss, The Martins, David Phelps, Matthew Holt

=== Gospel ===
Southern Gospel Song of the Year

- "Happy People" – Ernie Haase & Signature Sound, (writers) Ernie Haase, Wayne Haun, Joel Lindsey
- "Sometimes It Takes a Mountain" – Gaither Vocal Band, (writers) Mark Mathes, Gloria Gaither
- "What A Happy Time" – Goodman Revival, (arrangers) Michael Sykes, Johnny Minick
- "Pray Now" – Karen Peck & New River, (writers) Karen Peck Gooch, Dave Clark and Michael Farren
- **"Hidden Heroes" – The Talleys, (writers) Dixie Lynn Phillips and Sharon Phillips**

Southern Gospel Album of the Year

- Sometimes It Takes a Mountain – Gaither Vocal Band, (producers) Bill Gaither, Ben Isaacs, David Phelps
- Songs in the Key of Happy – Goodman Revival, (producers) Michael Sykes, Johnny Minick
- Threads of Mercy – Ivan Parker, (producer) Roger Talley
- **Pray Now** – Karen Peck & New River, (producer) Wayne Haun
- Living in Harmony – Triumphant, (producer) Wayne Haun

Contemporary Gospel/Urban Song of the Year

- "Worth Fighting For" – Brian Courtney Wilson, (writers) Brian Courtney Wilson and Aaron Lindsey
- **"I Luh God (ft. Big Shizz)" – Erica Campbell (writers) Warryn Campbell, Erica Campbell, LaShawn Daniels**
- "Flaws" – Kierra Sheard, (writer) Diane Warren
- "Say Yes (ft. Beyoncé & Kelly Rowland)" – Michelle Williams, (writers) Harmony Samuels, Michelle Williams, H."Carmen Reece" Culver, Al Sherrod Lambert
- "No Greater Love" – Smokie Norful, (writers) Aaron W. Lindsey and Smokie Norful

Contemporary Gospel/Urban Album of the Year

- Vintage Worship – Anita Wilson, (producers) Rick Robinson, Anita Wilson
- I Will Trust – Fred Hammond, (producers) Fred Hammond, Raymond Hammond, Geo Bivins, Calvin Rodgers, Phillip Feaster, King Logan, Shuan Martin
- Graceland – Kierra Sheard, (producer) J. Drew Sheard II
- Journey to Freedom – Michelle Williams, (producer) Harmony Samuels
- **Forever Yours** – Smokie Norful, (producers) Aaron Lindsey, Antonio Dixon, Derek "DOA" Allen, BlacElvis, Tre Myles

Traditional Gospel Song of the Year

- "Fill Me Up" – Casey J (writer) William Reagan
- "#War" – Charles Jenkins & Fellowship Chicago, (writer) Charles Jenkins
- **"How Awesome Is Our God (ft. Yolanda Adams)"** – Israel & New Breed (writers) Israel Houghton, Nevelle Diedericks, Meleasa Houghton
- "This Place" – Tamela Mann (writer) Darrell Blair
- "God My God" – VaShawn Mitchell (writer) VaShawn Mitchell
- "Send The Rain" – William McDowell (writer) William McDowell and William McMillan

Traditional Gospel Album of the Year

- **Worth Fighting For** – Brian Courtney Wilson, (producer) Aaron W. Lindsey
- The Truth – Casey J, (producers) Korey Bowie, Chris Carter
- Any Given Sunday – Charles Jenkins & Fellowship Chicago, (producer) Charles Jenkins
- Amazing – Ricky Dillard and New G, (producers) Ricky Dillard, Will Bogle, Rick Robinson
- Unstoppable – VaShawn Mitchell, (producers) VaShawn Mitchell and Daniel Weatherspoon

=== Country and Bluegrass ===
Bluegrass Song of the Year

- "Stacking Up Rocks" – Balsam Range, (writer) Buddy Melton
- "Mighty To Save" – Chigger Hill Boys & Terri (writers) Ben Fielding, Reuben Morgan
- "He Made The Tree" – Doyle Lawson and Quicksilver, (writers) Tom Botkin and Donnie Skaggs
- **"God Is There" – Lizzy Long & Rhonda Vincent, (writers) Wayne Haun and Joel Lindsey**
- "Daddy Was An Old Time Preacher Man (ft. Rhonda Vincent) – Volume Five, (writers) Dolly Parton and Dorothy Jo Owens

Country Song of the Year

- "I Saw The Light" – Alabama (writer) Hank Williams, Sr.
- "I'll Be There With You" – Doug Anderson (writers) Shelby Haun, Wayne Haun and Joel Lindsey
- "Ain't It Just Like The Lord" – Gordon Mote, (writers) Lee Black, Jason Cox, Kenna Turner West
- "I Wanna Be There" – The Isaacs, (writers) Jimmy Yeary, Sonya Isaacs and Rebecca Isaacs Bowman
- **"Sweet Jesus (ft. Merle Haggard)" – The Oak Ridge Boys (writers) Merle Haggard, Kenny Vernon**

Bluegrass/Country Album of the Year

- **Angels Among Us** – Alabama, (producers) Jeff Cook, Teddy Gentry, Randy Owen
- Worship Him – John Bowman, (producer) John Bowman
- Directions Home (Songs We Love, Songs You Know) – Point of Grace, (producers) Andy Leftwich, Stuart Dill, Rodger Ryan, Point of Grace
- Here's to the Ones – Rhett Walker Band, (producers) Paul Moak, Ed Cash, Rhett Walker Band
- Rock of Ages, Hymns and Gospel Favorites – The Oak Ridge Boys, (producers) Ben Isaacs, Duane Allen

=== Praise and Worship ===
Worship Song of the Year

- "Great Are You Lord" – All Sons & Daughters, (writers) David Leonard, Jason Ingram, Leslie Jordan (publishers) Integrity's Alleluia! Music/Integrity's Praise! Music/Open Hands Music/Sony/ATV Timber Publishing
- "Holy Spirit" – Francesca Battistelli, (writers) Bryan Torwalt, Katie Torwalt (publishers) Capitol CMG Genesis/Jesus Culture Music
- "Forever (We Sing Hallelujah)" – Kari Jobe, (writers) Brian Johnson, Christa Black Gifford, Gabriel Wilson, Jenn Johnson, Joel Taylor, Kari Jobe (publishers) Bethel Music Publishing/KAJE Songs/Worship Together Music
- **"Because He Lives (Amen)" – Matt Maher, (writers) Chris Tomlin, Daniel Carson, Ed Cash, Gloria Gaither, Jason Ingram, Matt Maher, Bill Gaither (publishers) Alletrop Music/Hanna Street Music/I Am A Pilgrim Songs/Open Hands Music/S. D. G. Publishing/sixsteps Music/Sixsteps Songs/Worship Together Music/worshiptogether.com songsworshiptogether.com**
- "This Is Amazing Grace" – Phil Wickham, (writers) Jeremy Riddle, Josh Farro, Phil Wickham (publishers) Bethel Music Publishing/Phil Wickham Music/Seems Like Music/Sing My Songs/WB Music Corp.

Worship Album of the Year

- All Sons & Daughters – All Sons & Daughters, (producers) Paul Mabury and Shane Wilson
- We Will Not Be Shaken – Bethel Music, (producers) Bobby Strand and Chris Greely
- Love Ran Red – Chris Tomlin, (producer) Ed Cash
- **No Other Name** – Hillsong Worship, (producer) Michael Guy Chislett
- Even So Come – Passion, (producer) Nathan Nockels

=== Others ===
Children's Music Album of the Year

- Capitol Kids! Hits – Capitol Kids!, (producer) Brian Hitt
- Best of Lifeway Kids Worship Volume 1 – Lifeway Kids, (producer) Jeremy Johnson, Paul Marino, Jeffrey B. Scott
- Sing The Bible with Slugs & Bugs – Randall Goodgame (producer) Ben Shive
- Brave – Saddleback Kids, (producer) David Dalton
- 25 Favorite Sing-A-Long Hymns for Kids – Songtime Kids, (producer) Larry Hall
- **Kids** – The Hoppers, (producer) Mike Hopper

Spanish Language Album of the Year

- Fuego – Esperanza de Vida, (producers) Eduardo Durney and Armando Moreno
- Gloria A Dios – Gateway Worship, (producers) Walker Beach, Robert Quintanay, Rosemary Taleton
- Esto Es Jesus Culture – Jesus Culture, (producer) Jeremy Edwardson
- Me Vistio De Promesas – Julissa, (producers) Mike Rivera, Onis Rodriguez, Wiso Aponte, Chris Rocha
- **Como En El Cielo** – Miel San Marcos, (producers) Josh Morales, Luis Morales, Jr., Samy Morales, Chris Rocha, Roberto Prado

Christmas Album of the Year

- Christmas – Guy Penrod, (producer) Michael Omartian
- When Christmas Comes – Kim Walker-Smith, (producer) Jeremy Edwardson
- **The Spirit of Christmas** – Michael W. Smith & Friends, (producers) Michael W. Smith, Robert Deaton, David Hamilton
- Motown Christmas – Various Artists, (producer) Aaron Lindsey
- All Is Calm, All Is Bright – Various Artists, (producers) Andrew Greer and Kyle Buchanan

Choral Collection of the Year

- **Splendor of Heaven, (creators) Geron Davis, Tyler Brinson**
- Ready To Sing Gaither Homecoming Favorites, (creator) Russell Mauldin
- The Song of Christmas, (creators) Phil Barfoot, Cliff Duren, Ken Barker, Craig AdamsONE, (creators) Bradley Knight
- Then Sings My Soul (A Worship Service of Hymns, Scripture and Inspirational Readings For Choir, Congregation and Worship Leader), (creators) Cliff Duren

Recorded Music Packaging

- After All These Years – Andrew Peterson, (art director & design) Christopher Tobias (hand lettering) Joseph Alessia (photographer) Keely Scott
- Anchor – Colton Dixon, (art director & design) Sarah Sung (photographer) David Molnar
- **Neon Steeple – Crowder, (art director) Shelley Giglio, Mike McCloskey, Leighton Ching, Becca Wildsmith, (design) Leighton Ching (photographer) Zack Arias, Mary Caroline Mann**
- Anomaly – Lecrae, (art director) Don Clark, (designer) Invisible Creature, (illustrator) Robert Carter, Kevin Fleming, Shinbone Creative (photographer) Mary Caroline Mann
- Rise – Trip Lee, (art directors) Alex Medina, Ryan Clark, (design) Invisible Creature (illustrator) Ryan Clark (photographer) Sam Hurd

=== Musicals ===
Musical of the Year

- At The Cross (Love Ran Red), (creator) Bradley Knight
- The Cross Changes Everything, (creators) Jeff Bumgardner, Joel Lindsey
- If The Grave Could Shout, (creator) Jason Cox
- Once You've Seen The Star, (creator) Belinda Smith
- **We're Glad You Came (A Musical Celebration of the Savior's Birth), (creators) Jeff Bumgardner, Joel Lindsey**

Youth/Children's Musical of the Year

- An Unplugged Christmas, (creators) Susie Williams, Luke Gambill
- David's Dynasty, (creators) Gina Boe, Barb Dorn, Sue C. Smith, Christopher Davis
- The Go Tour, (creators) Jeff Slaughter, Brian Green
- God's Not Dead (A Faith Musical For Kids), (creators) Dale Mathews, Dana Anderson
- **Back to the Cross (A Kids Musical Adventure Through Time), (creator) Christy Semsen**

=== Videos ===
Short Form Music Video of the Year

- **You Can't Stop Me – Andy Mineo, (director & producer) Kyle Dettman**
- Take This City – Everfound, (director & producer) Sean Hagwell
- Shoulders – for KING & COUNTRY, (director) Ben Smallbone (producer) Ben Stansbury
- Dreams – King's Kaleidoscope, (director & producer) David Faddis, Belief Films
- Wake Up – NF, (director) Jon Jon Augustavo (producer) Andrew Lerios, PhilyMack Productions

Long Form Video of the Year

- We Will Not Be Shaken – Bethel Music, (director) Nathan Grubbs and Luke Manwaring, (producer) Nathan Grubbs
- Wake Up the Wonder – Elevation Worship, (director) Steven Lester (producers) Steven Furtick, Cherish Rush, Lindsey Newton, Kelly Draddy & Ashley Hollingsworth, Elevation Church
- **No Other Name (Live at Hillsong Conference) – Hillsong Worship, (directors) Ben Field and Richard Cause (producer) Ben Field, Hillsong**
- Faithful – NewSong (director) Nathan Corona (producer) Austin Woodward, Dust Brand Films
- This Is Our Time – Planetshakers, (director) Peter John (producer) Planetshakers, Epik Films

=== Films ===
Inspirational Film of the Year

- Do You Believe? (director) Jon Gunn (producers) Pure Flix Entertainment, 10 West Studios, Believe Entertainment, Toy Gun Films
- Left Behind, (director) Vic Armstrong (producer) Stoney Lake Entertainment
- **Moms' Night Out, (directors) The Erwin Brothers (producers) Affirm Films, FourBoys Entertainment, Provident Films, Pure Flix Entertainment, TriStar Pictures**
- The Song, (director) Richard Ramsey (producers) City on a Hill Productions, Jorva Entertainment Productions
- When the Game Stands Tall, (director) Thomas Carter (producers) Affirm Films, Mandalay Pictures
