= No One Else (album) =

Live album by Kurt Carr
- Released: March 25, 1997
- Recorded: July 27, 1996
- Venue: West Angeles Church of God in Christ in Los Angeles
- Genre: Urban contemporary gospel
- Label: GospoCentric

Kurt Carr chronology
Serious About It (1994)	No One Else (1997)	Awesome Wonder (2000)

No One Else is a live album and the fourth overall album by Kurt Carr & the Kurt Carr Singers. "For Every Mountain" is featured on the record, becoming a feature. It serves as their second release on GospoCentric Records, after releasing Serious About It! in the fall of 1994. It was produced by various figures including Carr himself. The album sold 100,000 copies in the US.

== Background ==
After successfully releasing Serious About It! two years earlier as their debut on the GospoCentric label, the group commenced a live recording at West Angeles COGIC in July 1996, with several celebrities in attendance. The album was released in March 1997. The record scored well and it stayed on the charts for more than a year. Mary Mary, Anastacia, and Andrea McClurkin-Melinni served as additional Background Vocals. Judith McAllister serves as Guest Artist on The Lord Strong and Mighty, which also introduces new member to the Kurt Carr Singers, Jackie Boyd. The album also introduces Yvette C. Williams into the Kurt Carr Singers after serving as a part of Additional Background on the previous album, leading For Every Mountain on this one, which became a standout feature. This record blends choral arrangements, R&B, and hip-hop.

== Track listing ==
Track listing for No One Else
#	Title	Time	Notes
1.	"Intro"	0:38	Lead vocals: Narration by Edna Tatum
2.	"Kumbaya"	5:27	Lead vocals: Kurt Carr and Sherron Bennett. Features a sample of the original, while including additional lyrics.
3.	"For Every Mountain"	7:25	Lead vocals: Yvette C. Williams.
4.	"The Lord Strong and Mighty"	5:24	Lead vocals: Jackie Boyd with Judith McAllister as guest speaker.
5.	"Grateful"	6:32	Lead vocals: Nikki Potts; also include notable singing ad libs from Kurt Carr.
6.	"Narration"	1:07	Lead vocals: Narration by Edna Tatum
7.	"If It Wasn't for Your Grace"	6:26	Lead vocals: Corey Briggs and Sherron Bennett
8.	"Do You Know Him"	4:46	Lead vocals: Kurt Carr. Jackie Boyd leads the extended end on the Live Video cut. Combines samples of the original, along with the Edwin Hawkins arrangement.
9.	"2nd Narration"	0:55	Lead vocals: Narration by Kurt Carr
10.	"No One Else"	5:31	Lead vocals: Kurt Carr and Yvette C. Williams
11.	"Been So Good"	4:34	Lead vocals: Kesha Ealy, Sherron Bennett, and Kurt Carr
12.	"Holy, Holy, Holy"	6:25	Lead vocals: All of The Kurt Carr Singers. The song was previously arranged by Kurt Carr before, being included on his first major label record Together from five years earlier.
13.	"Songs That Brought Us Over Medley"	7:01	Lead vocals: Kurt Carr (We've Come This Far By Faith), Jackie Boyd and Sherron Bennett (I've Decided To Make Jesus My Choice), Corey Briggs (In A Building Not Made by Hands), and Shervonne Wells (I'll Fly Away).
14.	"Hold On Be Strong" (bonus)	6:10	Lead vocals: Kesha Ealy

Notes

- The video of the album features a track, "Shout", where Shervonne Wells is the lead.
- In the original cassette release and in the actual recording, "Holy, Holy Holy" is the final track, even noted by Kurt Carr and also concert-concluding speaker during the ending of the track.

== Personnel ==
=== The Kurt Carr Singers ===
- Shervonne Wells
- Yvette C. Williams
- Sherron Bennett
- Kesha Ealy
- Corey Briggs
- Jackie Boyd
- Kurt Carr

'Additional background vocals

Ayanna Bereal, Janet Fuller, Velta Crawford, Anastacia Newkirk, Doriann Taylor, Holly Davis-Carter, Koda Turner, Markita Knight, Nikki Potts, Patrice Jones, Sheleta Taylor, Candance Lacey, Charese Kendricks, Iris Howse, Kim Blake, Nenetta Douglas, Robin Welch, Tanis Matthews, Teneka Beard, Mary Mary, Chaz Shepard, Dwight Sweeney, Eddie Tate, Frank Gray, Kevan Hall, Raymond Howard, Todd Bynum, Jonathan Grier, David Daughtry, Troy Clark, Andrea McClurkin-Mellini, and Sherri Wooten.

=== Musicians ===
- Jason White – Music Director, piano, organ, and synthesizer
- Kevin Bond – piano, synthesizer, and Programming
- Joel Smith – bass
- Jeremy Haynes – drums
