= Awesome Wonder =

Live album by Kurt Carr
- Released: September 19, 2000
- Recorded: 2000
- Venues: Faithful Central Bible Church, Inglewood California
- Genres: Urban contemporary gospel, worship, traditional gospel
- Length: 72:22
- Label: GospoCentric

Kurt Carr chronology
No One Else (1997)	Awesome Wonder (2000)	Kurt Carr Project: One Church (2005)

Awesome Wonder is a mostly live album and fifth overall album by Kurt Carr & the Kurt Carr Singers. It is known most notably for the hit "In the Sanctuary". It serves as their third release on GospoCentric Records after Serious About It! in 1994, and No One Else in 1997. It was and was produced by a various amount of figures including Carr himself. Other known tracks includes, I Almost Let Go, Set the Atmosphere, and more.

== Track listing ==
Track listing for Awesome Wonder
#	Title	Time	Notes
1.	"In the Sanctuary"	6:08	Lead by Kurt Carr and Yvette C. Williams
2.	"We Declare War"	5:51	Lead by Kurt Carr and Jackie Boyd
3.	"O My Soul Loves Jesus"	6:37	Lead by Nikki Potts
4.	"I Almost Let Go"	5:40	Lead by Tisa Willis and Sherron Bennett
5.	"We Offer You Praise"	4:43	Lead by Kurt Carr and guest artist Judith McAllister
6.	"Jesus Can Work It Out"	5:19	Lead by Shervonne Wells
7.	"Worship Medley"	6:22	Lead by Yvette C. Williams. Include rendition of "How I Love Jesus"
8.	"Reprise"	1:44	
9.	"Awesome Wonder"	4:58	Lead by Sherron Bennett, Nikki Potts, Jackie Boyd, and Troy Bright
10.	"The Blood Still Has Miraculous Power"	6:18	Lead by Yvette C. Williams
11.	"At All Times"	5:26	Lead by Jackie Boyd and Nikki Potts
12.	"Narration"	1:08	Intro to following song
13.	"That's Just the Way the Father Is"	5:56	Lead by Troy Bright
14.	"Set the Atmosphere"	6:12	Features no lead, except for mostly speaking ad libs by Carr.

== Personnel ==
=== The Kurt Carr Singers ===
- Shervonne Wells
- Yvette C. Williams
- Sherron Bennett
- Nikki Potts
- Jackie Boyd
- Troy Bright

=== Additional background vocals ===
Andre Washington, Andrea McClurkin-Mellini, Betty Jackson, Candace Lacey, Carolyn Johnson-White, Cassandra O'Neal, Chaz Shepard, Curtis Allen, Dana Hill, David Daughtry, Dwight Swiney, Erik Kirks, Fredd Braggs, Geneen White, Ineta Washington, Janet Fuller, Jeanine McCoy, Jonathan Grier, Karen Yvette Johnson, Kimberly Barton, Kimberly Poullard, Koda Turner-McClain, Markita Knight, Marvinetta Clay, Nikki Ervin, Patrice Jones, Patricia Parker, Prez Blackman, Sheleta Taylor, Taneka Beard, Tanis Matthews, Terron Brooks, Tisa Willis, Toya Smith, Troy Clark

=== Musicians ===
- Jason White – keyboards
- Kevin Bond – keyboards
- Maurice Fitzgerald – bass
- Jimmy Neuble – bass
- Jeremy Haynes – drums
- Sheryl Harper – drums

== Charts ==
Chart performance for Awesome Wonder
Chart (2000)	Peak position
US Top Christian Albums (Billboard)	14
US Top Gospel Albums (Billboard)	5

== Certifications ==
Certifications for Awesome Wonder
Region	Certification	Certified units/sales
United States (RIAA)	Gold	500,000^{^}
^{^} Shipments figures based on certification alone.
