= Living It (album) =

Studio album by Dorinda Clark-Cole
- Released: February 17, 2015
- Genre: Black gospel
- Length: 51:42
- Label: Light
- Producer: LaShawn Daniels, Courtney Harrell, Deon Kipping, Travis Malloy, Donnie McClurkin, Londell "Diezel" Robinson, Rick Robinson, Rodrick "Cliche" Simmons, Asaph Ward, Daniel Weatherspoon, Joe "Flip" Wilson, Larry Wilson

Living It is the fifth studio album by Dorinda Clark-Cole. Light Records released the album on February 17, 2015. She worked with music producers, LaShawn Daniels, Courtney Harrell, Deon Kipping, Travis Malloy, Donnie McClurkin, Londell "Diezel" Robinson, Rick Robinson, Rodrick "Cliche" Simmons, Asaph Ward, Daniel Weatherspoon, Joe "Flip" Wilson, and Larry Wilson, in the production of this album. This album was nominated for a Grammy Award in the Best Gospel Album category at the 58th edition of the awards.

== Track listing ==
Track list
| No. | Title | Writer(s) | Length |
|---|---|---|---|
| 1. | "You Are" | Dorinda Clark-Cole, Courtney Harrell, Deon Kipping, Saaed Shy Renaud, Danny Weatherspoon, Joe "Flip" Wilson | 4:37 |
| 2. | "The Name" | Clark-Cole, LaShawn Daniels, Gerald Haddon, J. Wilson | 3:11 |
| 3. | "Use Me" | Shanika Bereal, Fields Blanchard, Clark-Cole, Saaed Shy Renaud, Rodrick "Cliche" Simmons | 3:54 |
| 4. | "Bless This House" | Bereal, Blanchard, Clark-Cole, Renaud, R. Simmons | 5:14 |
| 5. | "In the Dark" | Clark-Cole, C. Harrell, J. Wilson | 4:01 |
| 6. | "Save Me Now" (featuring Matt Jones) | Clark-Cole, Kipping, Al Sherrod | 4:59 |
| 7. | "Holy" | Clark-Cole, Travis Malloy, Larry Wilson | 4:53 |
| 8. | "Antidote" | Blanchard, Clark-Cole, Renaud, R. Simmons | 3:18 |
| 9. | "He Still Loves Me" | Blanchard, Clark-Cole, Renaud, J. Wilson | 3:26 |
| 10. | "Living It" (featuring Matt Jones) | Bereal, Clark-Cole, Harrell, Rick Robinson | 5:08 |
| 11. | "Write My Name" | Mattie Moss Clark | 9:01 |
| Total length: | | | 51:42 |

== Chart performance ==
| Chart (2015) | Peak position |
|---|---|
| US Top Gospel Albums (Billboard) | 2 |
| US Independent Albums (Billboard) | 23 |
