= Grand Symphony =

Studio album by Ricardo Sanchez
- Released: October 2, 2015
- Genre: Worship, Christian pop, Christian EDM, Christian rock
- Length: 53:18
- Label: Difference

Grand Symphony is the fourth album and a studio album from Ricardo Sanchez. Difference Media Group released the album on October 2, 2015.

== Critical reception ==
Professional ratings
Review scores
Source	Rating
CCM Magazine	4/5 stars
New Release Today	3.5/5 stars
Worship Leader	4.5/5 stars

Awarding the album four stars at CCM Magazine, Andy Argyrakis writes, "Sanchez proves he's just as capable conveying bountiful beats and uplifting messages in the studio environment." Barry Westman, rating the album four and a half stars from Worship Leader, states, "This album is sure to provide something for everyone." Rating the album three and a half stars for New Release Today, Mark Ryan describes, "Grand Symphony of praises to be lifted up to Him in perfect harmony."

== Track listing ==
No.	Title	Writer(s)	Length
1.	"Por Cristo, For Christ"	Israel Houghton, Ricardo Sanchez	03:35
2.	"All Power"	Houghton, Sanchez	05:00
3.	"Halle — Halle"	Houghton, Sanchez	03:47
4.	"Grand Symphony"	Houghton, Sanchez	05:59
5.	"Breathe Your Name"	Obe Brown, Houghton, Sanchez	04:50
6.	"Life"	Houghton, Aaron Lindsey, William McDowell, Sanchez	03:38
7.	"Forgiven"	Sanchez	03:10
8.	"Take Over"	Houghton, Sanchez	05:16
9.	"Hope Is Here"	Houghton, Sanchez	04:09
10.	"Sing Hallelujah"	Sanchez	03:24
11.	"Love the Name"	Houghton, Lindsey, McDowell, Sanchez	04:45
12.	"Redeemed"	Sanchez	04:30
13.	"Redeemed (Reprise)"	Sanchez	01:28
Total length:			53:19
