= Stand Out (disambiguation) =

Stand Out may refer to:

- Stand Out, 2008 live album by Tye Tribbett
  - A track from the album above
- "Stand Out", a 1995 song by Tevin Campbell from A Goofy Movie.
- "Stand Out", a 2005 song by the Bratz Rock Angelz from Rock Angelz.
- "Stand Out", a 2014 song by Sabrina Carpenter from How to Build a Better Boy.
- "Stand Out", a 2016 song by Morgan Wallen from The Way I Talk.
