= Nobody Else (disambiguation) =

Nobody Else is a 1995 album by Take That, as well as the album's title track.

Nobody Else may also refer to:

- "Nobody Else" (Backstreet Boys song)
- "Nobody Else" (Anthony Hamilton song)
- "Nobody Else" (LANY song)
- "Nobody Else" (Shara Nelson song)
- "Nobody Else" (Liam Payne song)
- "Nobody Else" (CeCe Peniston song)
- "Nobody Else" (Tex Pistol and Rikki Morris song)
- "Nobody Else" (Tyrese song)
- "Nobody Else" (Summer Walker song)
- "Nobody Else", a 1990 song by René Froger
- "Nobody Else" (Suspects), a two-part 2014 television episode

== See also ==
- ...& Nobody Else
- No One Else (disambiguation)
