= Sounds of Revival =

Live album by William McDowell
- Released: January 22, 2016
- Recorded: June 5, 2015, Bethany Church, Baton Rouge, Louisiana
- Genre: Gospel, CCM, worship, urban contemporary gospel, traditional black gospel
- Length: 77:37
- Label: Entertainment One
- Producer: Clay Bogan III, William McDowell

William McDowell chronology
Withholding Nothing (2013)	Sounds of Revival (2016)	Sounds of Revival II: Deeper (2017)

Sounds of Revival is a live album by Pastor William McDowell, and his fourth album release. Entertainment One Music released the album on January 22, 2016. McDowell worked with Clay Brogan III, in the production of this album.

== Background ==
This album was recorded in Baton Rouge, Louisiana, with a congregation of 3,000 worshippers, at Bethany Church, on June 5, 2015. He got Clay Bogan III to produce the album.

== Critical reception ==
Professional ratings
Review scores
Source	Rating
Worship Leader	5/5 stars

Awarding the album five stars at Worship Leader, Darryl Bryant states, "Sounds of Revival is a powerhouse project from start to finish. With lush vocal arrangements and orchestration, this is big production at its finest."

== Track listing ==
Track list
No.	Title	Writer(s)	Length
1.	"To The Chief Musician (The Sound-Part III)"	Clay Bogan III, William McMillan	01:42
2.	"Life" (Featuring Taylor Poole)	Israel Houghton, Aaron Lindsey, William McDowell, Ricardo Sanchez	05:05
3.	"We Just Want You"	Lindsey, McDowell	05:57
4.	"It Is So" (Featuring Travis Greene)	Lindsey, McDowell	04:44
5.	"It Is So (Reprise)"	Lindsey, McDowell	02:00
6.	"Reveal" (Featuring José Garrafa)	José Garrafa, McDowell	05:10
7.	"Spirit Break Out" (Featuring Trinity Anderson)	Ben Bryant, Myles Dhillon, Luke Hellebronth, Tim Hughes	04:15
8.	"Come Like A Rushing Wind"	McDowell, Taylor Poole	02:34
9.	"Don't Mind Waiting"	McDowell	11:43
10.	"Jesus Is Here"	McDowell	03:46
11.	"Hymn Of Praise" (Featuring Julia McMillan And Daniel Johnson)	McDowell	05:52
12.	"When You Walk Into The Room" (Featuring Taylor Poole And Trinity Anderson)	Katie Torwalt	08:23
13.	"Send The Rain"	McDowell, McMillan	09:24
14.	"Heaven's Open" (Featuring Daniel Johnson)	McDowell	03:00
15.	"Rain Only Matters/Expecting A Harvest"	McDowell	04:17
Total length:			77:38

== Chart performance ==
Chart (2016)	Peak position
US Billboard 200	46
US Top Gospel Albums (Billboard)	1
US Independent Albums (Billboard)	2
