= No One Else (disambiguation) =

"No One Else" is a song by American girl group Total featuring American rapper Da Brat.

No One Else may also refer to:

- No One Else (album), by Kurt Carr
- "No One Else" (Chris Brown song)
- "No One Else" (Weezer song)
- "No One Else", a musical number from Natasha, Pierre & The Great Comet of 1812

== See also ==
- Nobody Else (disambiguation)
