= XTC (album) =

Studio album by Anthony Hamilton
- Released: 1996 (scheduled)
- Recorded: 1995–1996
- Genres: R&B; soul; neo soul; gospel
- Label: MCA
- Producers: George R. "Golden Fingers" Pearson; Timothy "Tyme" Riley; Jimmy "Luv" Jenkins; Ray "Spanky" Middleton; Jean Claude "Poke" Olivier

Anthony Hamilton chronology
XTC (1996)	Comin' from Where I'm From (2003)

Singles from XTC
- 1. "Nobody Else" Released: September 3, 1996

Professional ratings
Review scores
Source	Rating
AllMusic	4.5/5 stars

XTC (translated phonetically to Ecstasy) is the unreleased debut studio album by American R&B and soul singer-songwriter Anthony Hamilton. Scheduled to be released in late 1996 on MCA Records, the album's release was delayed further after the release of the single, "Nobody Else", which charted at number sixty-three on the Hot R&B/Hip-Hop Songs chart. After the promotional release of "I Wanna Be with You" b/w "Total XTC" in 1997, the album was eventually shelved.

== Track listing ==
#	Track	Producer(s)	Sample(s)	Length
1	"Total XTC"	Golden Fingers, Tyme	"You're the One I Need" by Barry White	4:45
2	"I Wanna Be with You"	Dominic Owens		5:00
3	"You're My Type of Woman"	Golden Fingers		4:29
4	"Nobody Else"	Poke, Golden Fingers, Luv, Spanky	"You Got Something" by B.T. Express	3:21
5	"Spend Some Time"	Golden Fingers		3:59
6	"I Will Go" feat. Terry Robertson	Golden Fingers	"Sadie" by The Spinners (uncredited)	3:47
7	"Fallin'"	Golden Fingers		4:09
8	"Forgive Me"	Golden Fingers	"Love T.K.O." by Teddy Pendergrass	3:18
9	"It's Only You"	Golden Fingers		5:08
10	"Special Kinda Love"	Golden Fingers		4:34
11	"In the Mood"	Golden Fingers		3:49
12	"Thank You (Interlude)"	Golden Fingers		1:20
