= Stand Out =

Live album by Tye Tribbett
- Released: May 6, 2008
- Recorded: August 17, 2007
- Venues: Rock Church International, Virginia Beach, Virginia
- Genre: Urban contemporary gospel
- Length: 80:00
- Label: Columbia
- Producer: Tye Tribbett

Tye Tribbett chronology
Victory Live! (2006)	Stand Out (2008)

Stand Out is the third album by American gospel music artist Tye Tribbett and the final album to feature his choir Greater Anointing (G.A.) before the choir was retired in 2009. The album is the group's second live recording. The album was recorded at a live concert on August 17, 2007 at the Rock Church International, Virginia Beach, Virginia and released on May 6, 2008.

== Background ==
In an interview before the live recording of Stand Out, Tye Tribbett, leader, writer and producer of the group, stated that the whole message behind the album and tour is Ephesians 6:11.

...it's a radical movement in the Gospel industry for the bold in Christ. It's the voice of the three Hebrew boys. They weren't going to be convinced or be manipulated to serve and worship anyone but the true and living God...

The album is the second live album released by Tye Tribbett & G.A., the first being 2006's "Victory Live!".

== Guest appearances ==
- Jon Owens on "Bless the Lord (Son of Man)".
- Tribbett revisits the album "Victory Live!" by expanding the interlude "Look Up" into a full-length song with Angela White and Kierra "Kiki" Sheard joining him on lead vocals.
- Kim Burrell on "He Has Made Me Glad".
- Judith Christie McAllister on "Jesus, I Love Your Name" (only on DVD video)

== CD Track listing ==
#	Title	Time
1.	"Stand Out"	4:45
2.	"Hold On"	5:07
3.	"Look Up"(with Kierra "Kiki" Sheard)	4:16
4.	"Bless The Lord""(with Jon Owens)	5:31
5.	"I Need You"	5:36
6.	"Prodigal Son"	4:22
7.	"All Hail the King"	4:38
8.	"Hallelujah"	4:12
9.	"Let Us Worship"	4:18
10.	"So Amazing"	5:26
11.	"He Has Made Me Glad"(with Kim Burrell)	6:43
12.	"I Made It Through"	7:11
13.	"Chasing After You (The Morning Song)"	6:48
14.	"Well Done"	7:12
15.	"Good in the Hood"	3:55

== Charts ==
Chart (2008)	Peak position
US Billboard 200	16
US Top Gospel Albums (Billboard)	1
