= Darnell Davis =

American gospel musician (born 1975)

- Born: Freeman Darnell Davis; April 1, 1975 (age 51); Minneapolis, Minnesota, U.S.
- Genres: Gospel, Christian R&B, CCM, worship, jazz, urban contemporary gospel, contemporary R&B, traditional black gospel
- Occupations: Worship leader, musician, singer, songwriter, music producer
- Instruments: Vocals, Piano, Organ
- Years active: 2007–present
- Label: RCA Inspiration
- Formerly of: The Remnant
- Website: facebook.com/theremnantmuzik

Freeman Darnell Davis (born April 1, 1975) is an American gospel musician and recording artist, music producer, and worship leader. He started his music career, in 2007, and has since released two studio albums. His second studio album, Moving Forward, was his breakthrough release upon the Billboard magazine charts.

== Early life ==
Davis was born, Freeman Darnell Davis, on April 1, 1975, in Minneapolis, Minnesota, the son of Freeman Davis and Shirley Jean Bogan.

== Music career ==
His music recording career began with The Remnant in 2007, with their first studio album, Psalms of the Remnant, that was released on February 6, 2007, with FS Records. The subsequent studio album, Moving Forward, was released on March 25, 2014, from RCA Inspiration. This album was his breakthrough release upon the Billboard magazine charts, while it placed on the Gospel Albums and Heatseekers Albums charts, where it peaked at Nos. 17 and 41, correspondingly. The album was nominated for Traditional Gospel Album at the 45th GMA Dove Awards.

== Personal life ==
He married Edwarnese Alaine Spearman, on October 25, 1997, while they reside in Minneapolis, Minnesota.

== Discography ==
List of selected studio albums, with selected chart positions
Title	Album details	Peak chart positions	
Title	Album details	US Gosp	US Heat
Moving Forward	Released: March 25, 2014; Label: RCA Inspiration; CD, digital download	17	41
