= Victory Live! =

Live album by Tye Tribbett
- Released: May 23, 2006
- Recorded: December 3, 2005
- Venues: Deliverance Evangelistic Church, Philadelphia, Pennsylvania
- Genres: Urban contemporary gospel Gospel
- Length: 70:02
- Label: Columbia
- Producers: Tye Tribbett; Thaddaeus Tribbett; Dana Sorey: Chauncey Childs

Tye Tribbett chronology
Life (2004)	Victory Live! (2006)	Stand Out (2008)

Victory Live! is the third gospel music album of choir Tye Tribbett & Greater Anointing released on Columbia Records. It was recorded live on Saturday, December 3, 2005, at Philadelphia's Deliverance Evangelistic Church, and released May 23, 2006. The record blends traditional gospel music with various subgenres. Featured, are the known features including rendition of "Bless the Lord" and title track "Victory," it is often considered as Tye Tribbett and G.A.'s seminal work and one of the best and most popular gospel albums of the 2000s.

== Background ==
Tribbett and G.A. had garnered much critical acclaim and fanfare since their creation in 1996. From performing on the soundtrack to the Prince of Egypt movie to touring and producing for many artists - gospel and secular, the group was known for their high energy and their immerse musicality. Their first album Life, released in June 2004 garnered critical acclaim and further propelled group to mainstream attention. As a follow up to Life, Tribbett & G.A. decided to recorded a live concert in late 2005 locally in Philadelphia.

During preparations for the live recording of their second album, G.A. were hit with the news of death of one of their members - Dr. Kenneth Riddle, in a car crash in August 2005. Two others close to the choir also passed away. All three deaths occurred within the five months leading up to the live concert recording. Rather than cancel or postpone the recording, the group turned to prayer and persevered with their preparations.

Listening to the voice of faith within, Tribbett stepped out and challenged G.A. to consecrate themselves, forsaking any revenue from secular music for one year, relying solely on the Lord to provide. Everyone in G.A. accepted the challenge

== Recording ==
By the time December 3, 2005 came, there was a high level of anticipation for this live concert, as the venue was literally standing room only. The 5,000-seat church was filled to capacity, with nearly 1,000 fans turned away in the winter cold of Philadelphia. Many contemporaries were in attendance attendance included Israel Houghton, Donnie McClurkin, Hezekiah Walker, James Hall, Kim Burrell, Damien Hall and Teddy Riley of Guy, Mary Mary, Brent Jones, Warryn Campbell and Maurette Brown-Clark.

== Release ==
The album was released on May 23, 2006, to much critical and commercial acclaim. It debuted at #1 on the US Billboard Gospel charts, the first Tribbett and GA album to do so, and solidified the group as top gospel artists. It has since been celebrated as a landmark album for contemporary gospel for its musicality, high energy, and youthful appeal, as well as its overall influence in churches around that time. Songs like "Bless the Lord" and "Victory" have been fan favorites, as well as the song "Look Up" being revisited as a full version with Kierra Sheard in their followup 2008 album, Stand Out.

It was nominated for three Grammy Awards in 2007 - Best Contemporary R&B Gospel Album, as well as Best Gospel Song and Best Gospel Performance for the title track "Victory".

The album netted the group two Stellar Awards in 2007 for Urban/Inspirational Single Or Performance Of The Year and Contemporary Male Artist Of The Year. In a surprising move - Donald Lawrence, who won Artist Of The Year, passed on his award to Tribbett on stage during his acceptance speech.

== Track listing ==
#	Title	Time
1.	"Intro"	2:03
2.	"I Want It Back"	5:28
3.	"Bless the Lord"	5:21
4.	"Hallelujah to Your Name"	5:27
5.	"Everything Will Be Alright"	5:30
6.	"Everything Will Be Alright (Reprise)" (featuring Kim Burrell)	1:41
7.	"G.A. Hymn (Who Else But God)"	6:04
8.	"Seated at the Right Hand of God"	6:20
9.	"Look Up (Lude)"	1:08
10.	"No Other Choice"	4:44
11.	"Sinking"	7:19
12.	"Still Have Joy"	5:07
13.	"1-2 (Victory Check)"	3:18
14.	"Victory"	4:09
15.	"Victory (Outro)"	2:01
16.	"Everything Part I, Part II/Bow Before the King" (Bonus Track)	4:22

== Personnel ==
Lead vocals

- Tye Tribbett
- Kim Burrell on Everything Will Be Alright (Reprise)
- Demaris Tribbett on Seated at the Right Hand of God
- Aaron Camper and Angela White on G.A. Hymn (Who Else But God)
- Thaddaeus Tribbett on No Other Choice

Greater Anointing

- Sopranos: Demaris Tribbett, Dania Daniels, Carolyn Benjamin, Candace Felder, Shukriyyah "Peachie" Parham, Shaylah Stevens, Shannon Murray
- Tenors: Aaron Camper, Timothy Neil Kennedy, Darnell Parham, Jerome White, Kenneth L. Riddle, Lionel Brown
- Altos: Shanté Tribbett, Angela White, Cachet Bailey, Deanna Moore, Dionne Bowens, Kimberly Tribbett, Daneen Parham

SoundCheck (Band)

- Keyboards: Parris "Diddy" Bowens
- Organ/Keyboards: Dana "C-Bazz" Sorey
- Drums: George "Spanky" McCurdy
- Percussion: Leonard "Pudge" Tribbett
- Bass Guitar: Thaddaeus Tribbett
- Lead Guitar: Darnell Miller
- Trumpet: Christopher "Chris" Stevens
- Trumpet: Theljon Allen
- Alto Sax: Danté Felder
- Tenor Sax: Jeffrey Jones
- Trombone: Curtis Jones
- Flute: Delandria Mills

=== Technical credits ===
- Thom Cadley, Engineer
- James Poyser, Executive Producer
- Erwin Gorostiza, Art Direction
- James Cruz, Mastering
- Dana Sorey, Producer
- Ryan Moys, Overdub engineer
- Fusako Chubachi, Art Direction
- Chauncey Childs, Executive Producer

== Charts ==
Chart (2006)	Peak position
US Billboard 200	64
US Top Gospel Albums (Billboard)	1
