= Latice Crawford =

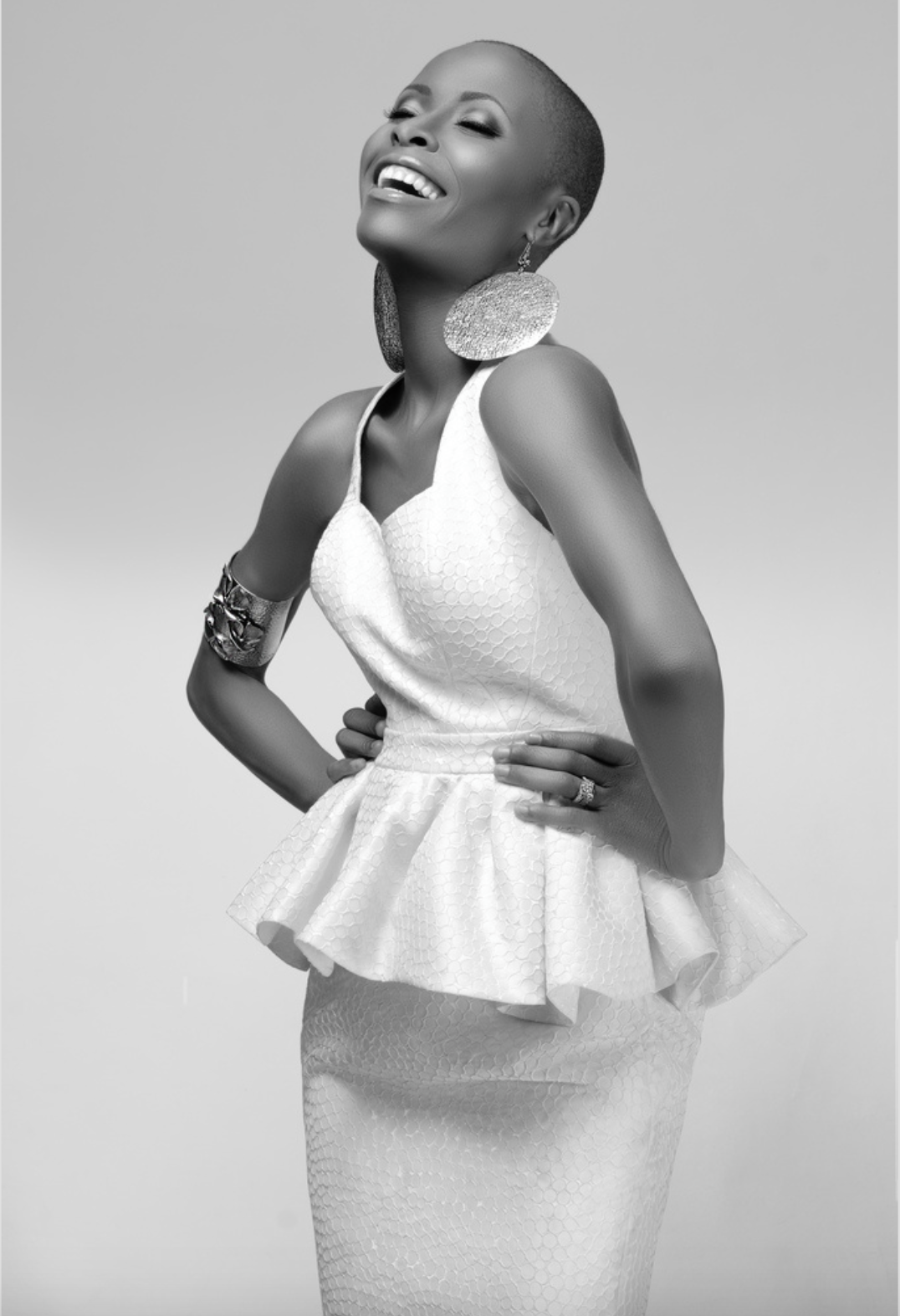
- Latice Crawford in July 2020

Background information
- Born: Latice Tenae Crawford; July 22, 1982 (age 44); Manhattan, New York
- Origin: Queens, New York
- Genres: Gospel, urban contemporary gospel
- Occupations: Singer, songwriter
- Instruments: Vocals, singer-songwriter
- Years active: 2014–present
- Labels: RCA, eOne
- Website: laticecrawfordonline.com

Latice Crawford (born July 22, 1982 as Latice Tenae Crawford) is an American urban contemporary gospel singer and composer. She is best known for using her three-octave, contralto vocal range of to finish third on the second season of the competitive gospel singing television show Sunday Best on Black Entertainment Television. Her self-titled debut album reached two Billboard charts, the Top Gospel Albums and the Top Heatseekers. Her second album, Diary of a Church Girl, also appeared on the Top Gospel Albums chart.

== Early life ==
Crawford was born in Manhattan, New York,. Growing up as the middle sister of three, Crawford sang in children's choirs and eventually rose to become a soloist and worship leader. This led to her serving in recording sessions, doing vocal references and singing background for established artists.

== Music career ==
Crawford first gained fame during her performances on Sunday Best, where she finished in third place.

Over the course of the series, Crawford gave well-received renditions of "Reach Out And Touch Somebody's Hand" and "Peace Be Still." Since the show, Crawford has starred in a reality series and released two studio albums.

Her first studio album, Latice Crawford, was released by RCA Inspiration in 2014,. Her sophomore release, Diary of a Church Girl, is a five-song EP. It features the songs "Author" and "Choose Me", which both made it to Billboard's Top Gospel Airplay and Hot Gospel Songs Charts. The EP also garnered Crawford her first Stellar Award Nomination for Contemporary Female Vocalist of the Year.

== Discography ==
=== Studio albums ===
List of studio albums, with selected chart positions
Title	Album details	Peak chart positions	
Title	Album details	US Gos	US Heat
Diary of a Church Girl (EP)	Released: 2016; CD, digital download	15	–
Latice Crawford	Released: 2014; Label: RCA Inspiration; CD, digital download	12	21

Select singles with Billboard Charting Information
Title	Song details	Peak chart positions	
Title	Song details	US Gos	US Gos
Choose Me	Released: 2016; CD, digital download; Album : Diary of A Church Girl	22	21
Author	Released: 2016; CD, digital download; Album : Diary of A Church Girl	24	23
There	Released: 2014; Label: RCA Inspiration; CD, digital download; Album : Latice Crawford	24	18

== Personal life ==
Latice resides in East Stroudsburg, Pennsylvania.
