= Dianne Wilkinson =

American singer-songwriter (1944–2021)

- Born: Dianne Branscum; December 7, 1944
- Died: November 30, 2021 (aged 76)
- Genres: Southern gospel
- Occupations: Singer, songwriter
- Instruments: vocals, singer-songwriter
- Website: http://www.diannewilkinson.com

Dianne Wilkinson (née Branscum; December 7, 1944 – November 30, 2021) was an American southern gospel singer, songwriter, and pianist. She was nominated in the Songwriter of the Year non-artist category at the 46th GMA Dove Awards.

Wilkinson was born Dianne Branscum, in Blytheville, Arkansas, during 1944, to her parents Marvin O. "Buster" and Blanche Branscum (née, Ross), while she has a brother Rev. James Branscum. She is a 1962 graduate of Blytheville High School. She retired from healthcare work from Dyersburg, Tennessee, where she resided with her husband, Timothy, who married on March 11, 1972, at Ridgecrest Baptist Church in Memphis, Tennessee. She was a member of Springhill Baptist Church in her hometown, where she played the piano during their worship services. Dianne died November 30, 2021, in Dyersburg, Tennessee.

She had a long storied career as a southern gospel songwriter for many artists, and she even got a nomination at the 46th GMA Dove Awards, in the Songwriter of the Year non-artist category. She had a close relationship with the Cathedral Quartet, who recorded 16 of her songs—including two of their signature songs, “We Shall See Jesus” and “Boundless Love.” Dianne was inducted into the Southern Gospel Music Hall of Fame in 2020.
