= Patrick Dopson =

American musical artist (born 1978)

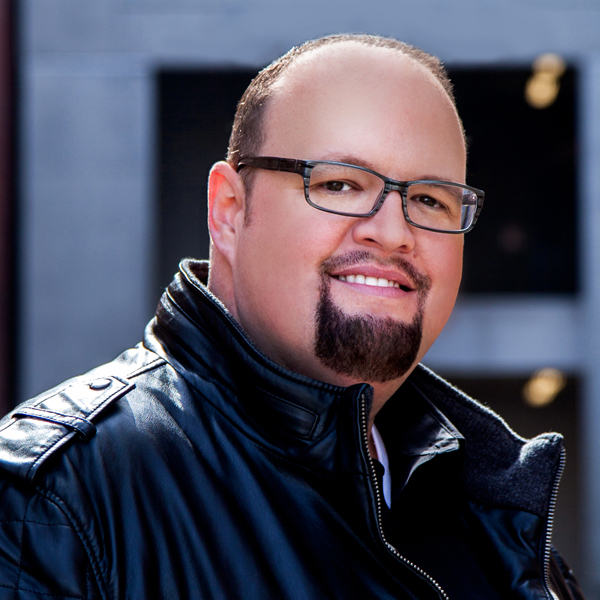

Background information
- Born: Patrick DeWayne Dopson; August 24, 1978 (age 48); Montgomery, Alabama, U.S.
- Origin: Montgomery, Alabama, U.S.
- Genres: Gospel
- Occupations: Singer, songwriter
- Instruments: Vocals, singer-songwriter
- Years active: 2012–present
- Labels: Oilonit, Central South
- Website: oilonit.com

Patrick DeWayne Dopson (born August 24, 1978) is an American gospel musician. He started his music career, in 2012, with the release of Open the Heavens by Oilonit Music, which is his own label, and Central South Distribution. This album was his Billboard magazine breakthrough release upon the Gospel Albums and Heatseeker Albums charts. The song, "Keep Me", was placed on both the WOW Gospel 2013 CD and DVD (music vid).

== Early life ==
Dopson was born in Montgomery, Alabama, on August 24, 1978, as Patrick DeWayne Dopson, whose father is Pastor Gary Dopson, and his mother Patricia Dopson, who are the leaders of Christway Church in Montgomery, Alabama. He has two brothers, Neil and Matt.

== Music career ==
His music career commenced in 2012, with the album, Open the Heavens, that was released on May 1, 2012, by his own label, Oilonit Records alongside Central South Records. This was his Billboard magazine breakthrough release upon the charts of The Gospel Albums at No. 23 and The Heatseeker Albums at No. 46. The song, "Keep Me", was placed on the WOW Gospel 2013 compilation album, and it chart at No. 7 on the Hot Gospel Songs chart. His song, "God Is", peaked at No. 14 on the aforementioned chart.

In July 2019 he became the Associate Pastor of Worship for Oak Cliff Bible Fellowship in Dallas, Texas under Pastor and Founder Tony Evans.

== Personal life ==
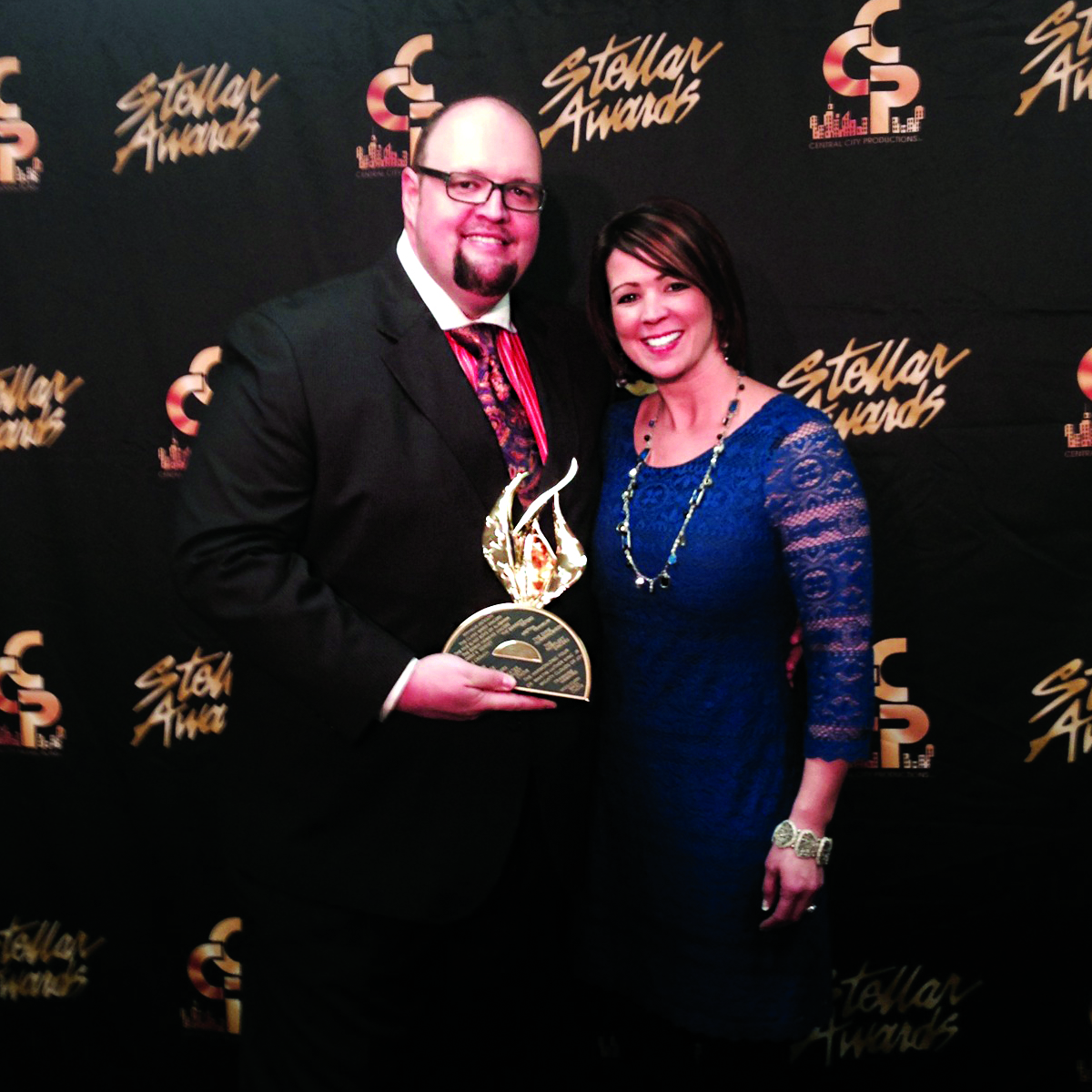
Patrick and Christina Dopson at 2014 Stellars

Dopson is married to Christina, and together they reside in Alabama.

In 2015 Patrick overcame a life-altering diagnosis of kidney cancer. "I have a chance to share my testimony in overcoming kidney cancer some years ago," he shares. He has been cancer free since then..

== Discography ==
List of studio albums, with selected chart positions
Title	Album details	Peak chart positions	
Title	Album details	US Gos	US Heat
Open the Heavens	Released: May 1, 2012; Label: Oilonit/Central South; CD, digital download	23	46
