= David Daughtry =

American gospel singer

- Birth name: David Calvert Daughtry
- Born: November 29, 1976 (age 48); Milwaukee, Wisconsin
- Origin: Los Angeles, California
- Genres: Gospel, traditional black gospel, urban contemporary gospel
- Occupation(s): Singer, songwriter, worship leader, actor
- Instrument: vocals
- Years active: 2014–present
- Labels: Entertainment One, Karew
- Website: daviddaughtrymusic.com

David Calvert Daughtry is an American gospel musician, actor, and Assistant Minister Of Music at West Angeles Church of God in Christ, while he is an urban contemporary gospel and a traditional black gospel recording artist and singer. He started his solo music career, in 2014, with the studio album, David Daughtry, that was released by Entertainment One Music and Karew Records. The album charted on two Billboard magazine charts.

== Early life ==
David Calvert Daughtry was born in Milwaukee, Wisconsin, where he started performing and understanding sheet music at six years-old. He is a worship leader at West Angeles Church of God in Christ.

== Music career ==
His individual music recording career began in 2014, with the studio album, David Daughtry, that was released on September 9, 2014, from both Entertainment One Music and Karew Records. The album charted on two Billboard magazine charts, while it placed on the Gospel Albums and Heatseekers Albums, where it peaked at Nos. 12 and 28, correspondingly.

== Acting career ==
He has appeared in the following movies: "Woman Thou Art Loosed", "Something New" & "First Sunday". He has also appeared in the following television shows: "The American Bible Challenge" & "Parenthood".

== Discography ==
List of studio albums, with selected chart positions
Title	Album details	Peak chart positions	
Title	Album details	US Gosp	US Heat
David Daughtry	Released: September 9, 2014; Label: Entertainment One/Karew; CD, digital download	12	28
