= Jonathan Nelson (singer) =

American singer-songwriter

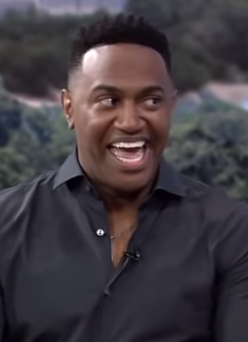
- Nelson in 2018

Background information
- Birth name: Jonathan Andrew Nelson
- Born: November 10, 1974 (age 50); Baltimore, Maryland, U.S.
- Genres: Contemporary Christian music
- Instrument: Vocals
- Years active: 2003–present
- Labels: Integrity, Light/eOne
- Website: www.jonathannelson.us

Jonathan Andrew Nelson (born November 10, 1974) is an American gospel singer and songwriter from Baltimore, Maryland.

== Career ==
Nelson was born in Baltimore, Maryland to James Nelson, a pastor at the Greater Bethlehem Temple Church, and his wife Bessie Nelson. He studied at the Baltimore School for the Arts and Morgan State University. During a performance of Karen Clark-Sheard at his church, Nelson and his friends served as backup singers. After that, they continued to practice and sing together under the stage name 'Purpose'.

After some time, Purpose released an independent album which included the song "Healed", written by Nelson. In 2000, Nelson met Donald Lawrence, a Grammy-nominated choir leader, at a workshop on Washington, D.C. Lawrence heard the song "Healed" and asked Nelson for permission to record the song. The song became a gospel hit in 2005, and Nelson won the Stellar Award as Songwriter of the Year in 2006. Nelson also met producer Troy Sneed, who had heard another Purpose song called "The Right Place". Sneed produced the song for Pastor Rudolph McKissick and it became another commercial hit. Some time later, Nelson wrote "The Struggle Is Over" for Sneed, which became another hit.

In December 2006, Nelson released a self-financed live album. After that, he signed with Integrity Music and started working on his first full-length studio album. In February 2008, Nelson released Right Now Praise. The next year, he was nominated for a Dove Award for New Artist of the Year. That same year, he accepted the position of minister of music at The Faith Center with Bishop Henry Fernandez Sunrise, Florida and Empowerment Temple Church with Dr. Jamal Bryant Baltimore, Maryland. In 2010, he released his second album titled Better Days.

In 2016, Nelson released Fearless, with Light Records/Entertainment One Music (eOne Music).

== Personal life ==
Born and raised in Baltimore, Maryland to James D. Nelson and Bessie Nelson. He has three older siblings Anthony, Janice and James Jr, as well as his twin Jason. He got his education in Baltimore City public school system.

== Discography ==
- Live in Baltimore: Everything You Are
- Right Now Praise, No. 7 on the Top Gospel Albums
- Better Days, No. 105 Billboard 200, and No. 4 on the Top Gospel Albums
- My Name is Victory
- Finish Strong (2013), No. 47 Billboard 200, and No. 1 on the Top Gospel Albums
- Fearless (2016), No. 117 Billboard 200

== Awards and nominations ==
Jonathan Nelson was nominated for a Dove Award for New Artist of the Year at the 40th GMA Dove Awards.
