= Ricardo Sanchez (musician) =

American musician (born 1967)

- Born: Ricardo Ángel Sánchez; October 2, 1967 (age 58); Scottsdale, Arizona
- Genres: Worship, CCM
- Occupations: Singer, songwriter, guitarist
- Instruments: Vocals, singer-songwriter, guitar
- Years active: 2005–present
- Labels: Taseis, Difference Media
- Website: ricardomusic.com

Ricardo Ángel Sánchez (born October 2, 1967) is an American Christian musician, guitarist, and worship leader, who is a Grammy-nominated GMA Dove Award-winning songwriter. He has released four albums, Unmerited, Oh What a God, It's Not Over, and Grand Symphony.

== Early life and background ==
Sánchez was born, Ricardo Ángel Sánchez, on October 2, 1967, in Scottsdale, Arizona, Arizona, to parents Vicente and Fransica Sanchez, the youngest of six siblings, four brothers and a sister. He grew up in the Catholic Church, where he went to services alone, and was in a mariachi group with his father, when he was five years-old. Sánchez eventually became a non-denominational Protestant, at The Free Chapel in Gainesville, Georgia, just outside Atlanta, Georgia, before relocating to San Antonio, Texas, to join John Hagee's Cornerstone Church.

== Music career ==
His music recording career started in 2005, with the album, Unmerited, that was released on May 24, 2005, by Taseis Music. He released the subsequent two albums, Oh What a God, on May 25, 2011, and, It's Not Over, on August 2, 2011. His fourth album, Grand Symphony, was released on October 2, 2015, his 48th birthday, with Difference Media Group.

== Awards and nominations ==
He won a GMA Dove Award for Contemporary Gospel Recorded Song in 2011, with Israel Houghton, for "The Power of One". He received a Grammy Award nomination at the 52 Grammy Awards, for "Every Prayer", in the category Best Gospel Song.

== Personal life ==
Sánchez is married to Jennette, and they have three sons, Ricardo II, Josiah, and Micah, where they reside in the San Antonio, Texas area. His son Josiah suffered a severe spinal injury, while he has since made a recovery.

== Discography ==
Studio albums

- Unmerited (May 24, 2005)
- Oh What a God (May 25, 2011)
- It's Not Over (August 2, 2011)
- Grand Symphony (October 2, 2015)
