= Chaz Lamar Shepherd =

American actor and singer-songwriter (born 1977)

- Born: October 26, 1977 (age 48); Philadelphia, Pennsylvania
- Other name: Chaz Shepherd
- Occupations: Actor, singer-songwriter, host, entertainment personality
- Years active: 1993–present

Chaz Lamar Shepherd is an American actor and singer-songwriter. He is best known for his roles as Artis Tower in Me and the Boys (1994–1995), John Hamilton on 7th Heaven (1996–2001), and Piranha in Luke Cage (2018). He is also known for his portrayal as Al Bryant in the 1998 NBC miniseries The Temptations.

== Early life ==
Shepherd grew up in Philadelphia, Pennsylvania, where he was active in Tindley Temple United Methodist Church and graduated from Evelyn Graves Christian Academy. His mother, Cheryl Shepherd, is a dancer and choreographer who left her work in Philadelphia's public schools to manage his career. He first appeared on stage when he was 5 years old as an MC at a recital for his mother's dance school.

== Career ==
Shepherd's professional debut came in a production of Fame staged by the Walnut Street Theatre. On television, he portrayed Al Bryant in the NBC miniseries The Temptations (1998).he also played on the Parkers. He also played Artis Tower, son of Steve Tower (Steve Harvey) on Me and the Boys and appeared on In the House, Moesha, and Sister, Sister. He played John Hamilton on 7th Heaven, had a recurring role as Trey Wiggs on The Game, and portrayed Raymond "Piranha" Jones in the second season of Luke Cage. He was also a guest lead vocalist on Judith Christie McAllister's first album, "Send Judah First" track 7, The Prayer of Recommitment, released in 2000.

Shepherd appeared on film in Set It Off in the role of Stevie, On Broadway, he portrayed Billy Flynn in Chicago (2018) and Harpo in The Color Purple (2005). His other work on stage includes appearing as Curtis Taylor, Jr. in a 2009–10 national tour of the musical Dreamgirls.

== Filmography ==
| Year | Title | Role | Notes |
|---|---|---|---|
| 1993 | Survive the Night | Thad | TV movie |
| 1994–1995 | Me and the Boys | Artis Tower | 19 episodes |
| 1995 | A Pig's Tale | Royce | Direct to video |
| 1996 | Moesha | Whitlock | Episode: "Million Boy March" |
| 1996 | Minor Adjustments | Bam | 2 episodes |
| 1996 | The Nutty Professor | Student | |
| 1996 | The Steve Harvey Show | Dexter | Episode: "Loose Lips Sink Friendships" |
| 1996 | Set It Off | Stevie Newsom | Credited as Chaz Lamar Shepard |
| 1996–1997 | Sister, Sister | Shawn Russell | 3 episodes |
| 1996–2001 | 7th Heaven | John Hamilton | 33 episodes |
| 1998 | Twice the Fear | College student | Direct to video |
| 1998 | In the House | Mark | 4 episodes |
| 1998 | The Temptations | Elbridge "Al" Bryant | TV movie |
| 2001 | Touched by an Angel | Young Candy McCloud | Episode: The Perfect Game |
| 2001–2002 | The Parkers | Aaron | 4 episodes |
| 2002 | The Division | Keith | Episode: "This Thing Called Love" |
| 2004 | Woman Thou Art Loosed | Deacon | |
| 2006–2007 & 2012 | The Game | Trey Wiggs | 4 episodes |
| 2016 | Haters Back Off! | Keith | 4 episodes |
| 2018 | Blue Bloods | Detective Chamberlin | Episode: "Close Calls" |
| 2018 | Marvel's Luke Cage | Raymond "Piranha" Jones | 6 episodes |
| 2019 | Almost Love | Damon | |
| 2022 | Never Would Have Made It: The Marvin Sapp Story | Marvin Sapp | TV movie |
| 2023 | Saturdays | Doug Jones | Episode: "Skates, Lies & Videos" |

== Discography ==
=== Albums ===
Love & Truth

- Released: October 26, 2010
- Label: Chaz Records/Introspect Music
- Formats: CD, Digital Download
