= Nobody Else (Anthony Hamilton song) =

Single by Anthony Hamilton

from the album XTC
- Released: October 8, 1996
- Recorded: 1996
- Genre: R&B, hip-hop soul
- Length: 3:21
- Label: MCA
- Songwriter: Anthony Hamilton
- Producers: George R. "Golden Fingers" Pearson, Timothy "Tyme" Riley

Anthony Hamilton singles chronology
| "Nobody Else" (1996) | "Comin' from Where I'm From" (2003) |

"Nobody Else" is an R&B–hip-hop soul song written and recorded by American singer-songwriter Anthony Hamilton for his unreleased album, XTC (1996). Released as the album's first and only single, the song was produced by George R. "Golden Fingers" Pearson and Timothy "Tyme" Riley. After being released in various formats in October 1996, the single entered the Billboard Hot R&B/Hip-Hop Songs at number ninety-one the week of October 26, 1996, spending sixteen weeks on the chart and peaking at number sixty-three.

== Track listing ==
American 12" promo single

Side A:

1. "Nobody Else" (LP Version) – 3:21
2. "Nobody Else" (Instrumental Version) – 3:21

Side B:

1. "I Will Go" (LP Version) – 3:47
2. "Nobody Else" (A cappella version) – 3:17

== Charts ==
| Chart (1996) | Peak position |
|---|---|
| U.S. Billboard Hot R&B Singles | 63 |
