= Kurt Carr =

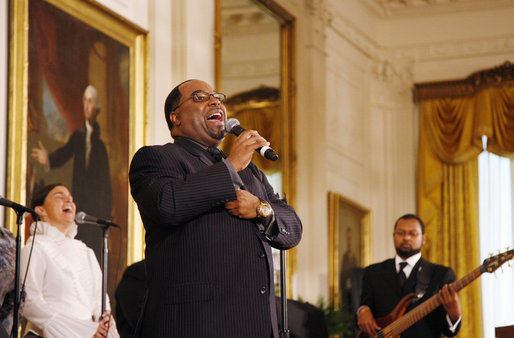
- The Kurt Carr Singers perform for President George W. Bush and guests on June 17, 2008 in the East Room of the White House

Background information
- Born: October 12, 1964 (age 62); Hartford, Connecticut, U.S.
- Genres: Gospel, praise & worship
- Occupations: Singer, songwriter
- Instruments: Vocals, piano
- Years active: 1986–present
- Labels: Light; GospoCentric; Verity Gospel Music Group; Interscope; RCA Inspiration
- Website: www.thekurtcarr.com

Kurt Carr (born October 12, 1964) is an American gospel music composer and performer. While living in the city of Hartford, Connecticut, he served as Minister of Music at The First Baptist Church of Hartford located at the time on Greenfield Street. He is currently the Praise and Worship leader at The Fountain Of Praise in Houston, Texas.

Carr's music is a blend of traditional gospel composition and vocals, with elements of R&B, jazz, soul, blues, and the distinct modern harmonies and singing styles found in urban contemporary gospel. The Kurt Carr Singers under his direction and musical influence have created seven albums. Kurt Carr has won four Stellar Awards.

== Biography ==
=== Early years ===
Kurt Carr was born in the mid-1960s in Hartford, Connecticut, where he grew up in a family who believed in Jesus, but was not deeply involved in church. At the age of 13, Carr found himself being increasingly drawn to the church. In his early teen years, he performed as an actor and dancer at the Hartford Stage Company in a Broadway musical called On the Town, which was directed by Clay Stevenson. He became an active member in his church's music department. At the age of 17, Carr realized that he was being called to do something even higher with his life. After high school, he entered into the music program at the University of Connecticut, where he studied classical music and earned a Fine Arts degree. Carr is a member of Phi Beta Sigma fraternity.

=== Music career ===
==== Early career ====
Carr was piano accompanist for Andrae Crouch's music ministry for one year. Carr was subsequently hired to be musical director and pianist for Rev. James Cleveland’s ministry in 1986 and was employed there for seven years, until Cleveland's death. Eventually, Carr became director of the West Angeles Church of God in Christ Choir, where he had the opportunity to work with both gospel and secular musical artists, including Stevie Wonder, Gladys Knight, Yolanda Adams and Kirk Franklin during that time Carr also formed a gospel vocal ensemble named The Kurt Carr Singers. They released their first EP, I'm Glad in 1988 released on an Independent label. After signing with Light Records, Kurt Carr and the singers' debut major label and album Together was released in 1991. Transitions in the label lead to GospoCentric Records which was owned and co-founded by to Vicki Mack Lataillade.

==== 1994–2000: Serious About It! and No One Else ====
Now signed onto GospoCentric, the group released their debut on the label titled Serious About It! The album featured renditions of many recorded songs, such as of Salt-N-Pepa's "Whatta Man", among others. The album succeeded onto the charts. In July 1996, the singers recorded their following album on the label, No One Else, at the West Angeles which was released in March 1997. The album also features Anastacia, Mary Mary, & Andrea McClurkin-Mellini (sister of Donnie McClurkin) serving as a few of the additional background singers. The album most notably featured "For Every Mountain", which became one of the Carr's most known features overtime.

==== 2000–2012: Growing success and acclaim ====
In 2000, Awesome Wonder was released, which featured more popular songs with "In the Sanctuary" being the most notable. "In the Sanctuary" became his most popular song, leading to internet memes among other ways to highlight the success of the song. The album stayed in the charts longer than the previous albums and it increased the group's success higher, eventually earning gold. With In the Sanctuary becoming more known, Carr took it upon to produce and write tracks for Byron Cage, among others such as Tramaine Hawkins, and Bishop Paul S. Morton. In July 2004, Kurt Carr recorded The Kurt Carr Project: One Church which was successfully released in March 2005. Centered upon being a multicultural church, it features "God Blocked It" and "God Great God", among others became staples.In 2008, Kurt Carr released his first two disc album Just the Beginning, which was released on his self titled label Kurt Carr Gospel and Zomba.

==== 2012–present: Bless This House and Bless Somebody Else ====
In 2013, Kurt Carr released Bless This House on Verity Gospel Music Group which included the single "I've Seen Him Do It", "We've Gotta Put Jesus Back", and "Great God Great Praise". After a six-year hiatus, Kurt Carr released Bless Somebody Else on RCA Records' Gospel Label RCA Inspiration in 2019 in which Kurt Carr Gospel Label from Just the Beginning returned. The single was released the same year as long with the single "Blessing After Blessing", which is a ballad a year later.

== Discography ==
=== Albums ===
List of albums, with selected chart positions, sales figures and certifications
Title	Album details	Peak chart positions				Sales	Certifications
Title	Album details	US	US R&B /HH	US Gospel	US Christian	Sales	Certifications
I'm Glad	Released: 1988; Label: Charnya Records (#CR 3123); Formats: LP	—	—	—	—		
Together	Released: 1991; Label: Light Records (#7-115-75043-2); Formats: CD	—	—	—	—		
Serious About It!	Released: November 29, 1994; Label: Gospo Centric (#72126); Formats: CD, cassette	—	—	—	—		
No One Else	Released: March 25, 1997; Label: GospoCentric (#G2 1S 7575 1 72138 2); Formats: CD, cassette	—	—	—	—	US: 100,000	
Awesome Wonder	Released: September 19, 2000; Label: GospoCentric (#75751-70016-2); Formats: CD, cassette	—	—	5	14	US: 400,000	RIAA: Gold
The Kurt Carr Project: One Church	Released: March 22, 2005; Label: GospoCentric, Zomba Gospel (#75751-70058-2); Formats: CD, cassette	109	27	1	—		
Just the Beginning	Released: October 28, 2008; Label: Zomba Gospel, Kurt Carr Gospel, (#88697297532); Formats: CD, HDCD	62	—	2	—		
Bless This House	Released: January 22, 2013; Label: Verity Gospel Music Group (#88691-96121-2); Formats: CD	43	—	1	—		
Bless Somebody Else	Released: July 19, 2019; Label: Kurt Carr Gospel, Sony Music, RCA Inspiration, Provident Distribution (#9075940842); Formats: CD	—	—	2	—		
"—" denotes releases that did not chart or were not released in that territory.

=== Compilation albums ===
List of albums, with selected chart positions
Title	Album details	Peak chart positions
Title	Album details	US Gospel
Playlist: The Very Best of Kurt Carr & the Kurt Carr Singers	Released: September 15, 2009; Labels: GospoCentric, Legacy, Verity (#57642); Formats: CD	33
Setlist: The Very Best Of Kurt Carr & The Kurt Carr Singers Live	Released: December 23, 2011; Labels: GospoCentric, Legacy, Sony Legacy (#88691 90780 2); Formats: CD	50

=== Singles ===
List of singles, with selected chart positions, showing year released and album name
Title	Year	Peak chart positions	Album
Title	Year	US Gospel	Album
"God Blocked It"	2004	3	One Church
"God Great God"	2004	26	One Church
"Peace And Favor Rest On Us"	2008	2	Just The Beginning
"Bless Somebody Else (Dorothy's Song)"	2019	18	Bless Somebody Else
"Blessing After Blessing"	2020	— (Note: "Blessing After Blessing" did not enter the US Billboard Hot Gospel Songs chart, but peaked at number 27 on the US Gospel Airplay chart.)	Bless Somebody Else
"—" denotes releases that did not chart or were not released in that territory.

=== Other charted songs ===
List of other charted, with selected chart positions, showing year charted and album name
Title	Year	Peak chart positions	Album
Title	Year	US Gospel	Album
"For Every Mountain"	1996	— (Note: "For Every Mountain" did not enter the US Billboard Hot Gospel Songs chart, but peaked at number 2 on the US Gospel Digital Song Sales chart.)	No One Else
"I Almost Let Go"	2000	— (Note: "I Almost Let Go" did not enter the US Billboard Hot Gospel Songs chart, but peaked at number 18 on the US Gospel Digital Song Sales chart.)	Awesome Wonder
"—" denotes releases that did not chart or were not released in that territory.	2000		
