= Deon Kipping =

American gospel musician (born 1979)

- Born: Deon Earl Maurice Kipping; April 9, 1979 (age 47); Bridgeport, Connecticut
- Genres: gospel, contemporary Christian music, urban contemporary gospel, contemporary worship music
- Occupations: Singer, songwriter
- Instruments: vocals, singer-songwriter
- Years active: 2006–present
- Labels: Verity, RCA Inspiration, Love & Life
- Website: deonkipping.com

Deon Earl Maurice Kipping (born April 9, 1979) is an American gospel musician. He started his music career, in 2006, with the release of, Real Life. Real Worship., by Love & Life Records. His second album, I Just Want to Hear You, was released in 2012 with Verity Records and RCA Inspiration. This album would chart on two Billboard charts Billboard 200 and the Gospel Albums chart.

== Early life ==
Kipping was born on April 9, 1979, in Bridgeport, Connecticut, as Deon Earl Maurice Kipping.

== Music career ==
His music career got started in 2006, with the release of Real Life. Real Worship. with Love & Life Records that was released on January 25, 2006. His second album, I Just Want to Hear You, was released on September 4, 2012 by Verity Records and RCA Inspiration. This was his breakthrough released on the Billboard charts, and it placed at No. 127 on Billboard 200 along with Gospel Albums at No. 6. Steve Leggett, at AllMusic, recognizes the album "shows the same clear and warm production polish", and Cross Rhythms' Darren Matthews rated the album a seven out of ten realizing, "Deon steps up to the mic to bring us a competent blend of old and new gospel sounds."

== Discography ==
List of studio albums, with selected chart positions
Title	Album details	Peak chart positions	
Title	Album details	US	US Gos
Real Life. Real Worship	Released: January 25, 2006; Label: Love & Life; CD, digital download	–	–
I Just Want to Hear You	Released: September 4, 2012; Label: Verity/RCA Inspiration; CD, digital download	127	6
