= RCA Inspiration =

- Parent company: Sony Music Entertainment
- Founded: 2005; 21 years ago
- Distributors: Sony Music Entertainment (mainstream); Provident-Integrity (Christian)
- Genre: Gospel
- Country of origin: United States
- Location: New York, NY
- Official website: www.rcainspiration.com

RCA Inspiration (formerly Verity Gospel Music Group) is a gospel music group operating under Sony Music Entertainment.

== History ==
=== Inception ===
In late 2002, BMG completed the purchase of the Zomba Group for US$2.74 billion and as a part of that deal, acquired the gospel label Verity Records. In 2004, BMG purchased GospoCentric Records and its sublabel B'Rite Music, which already had ties with Zomba since before the purchase. When BMG restructured the Zomba labels into the Zomba Label Group, those labels were initially moved there, however, in 2005, Zomba amalgamated its gospel interests in the new Zomba Gospel and operated it under the Zomba Label Group. The new group consisted of Verity Records, GospoCentric Records and four artist owned imprints: Quiet Water Entertainment (Donald Lawrence), Fo Yo Soul Entertainment (Kirk Franklin), New Life Records (John P. Kee) and F. Hammond Music (Fred Hammond). When BMG and Sony formed Sony BMG, Zomba Gospel (as a part of the Zomba Label Group) was shifted under the BMG Label Group as an amalgamation of BMG's interests in the merger.

=== Rebrandings ===
In August 2008, Sony purchased Bertelsmann's half of their Sony BMG merger. Since Bertelsmann kept the BMG name, Sony renamed the BMG Label Group to RCA/Jive Label Group in early 2009 and began the process of rebranding Zomba as the Jive Label Group. In another move to eschew the Zomba name, Zomba Gospel was rebranded as Verity Gospel Music Group, taking its name from their flagship label. Over a year after Jive disbanded in mid 2011, RCA Inspiration became the name for Verity Gospel Music Group by early 2013.

== Labels ==
- Fo Yo Soul
- GospoCentric Records
- B-Rite Music
- Quiet Water Entertainment
- Verity Records

== Awards ==
In May 2009, Verity Gospel made gospel music history being the first gospel label to hold the top four song positions on the R&R Gospel charts. The songs were:

1. "Souled Out" - Hezekiah Walker & LFC
2. "Back II Eden" - Donald Lawrence & Co
3. "Praise Him In Advance" - Marvin Sapp
4. "Peace & Favor Rest On Us" - Kurt Carr & The Kurt Carr Singers

== Artists ==
Per source

- Crystal Aikin
- Tamar Braxton
- Kurt Carr
- Latice Crawford
- Darnell Davis
- Dee-1
- Kirk Franklin
- Christon Gray
- The Greater Allen Cathedral
- Travis Greene
- Deitrick Haddon
- Fred Hammond
- Israel Houghton
- Jahméne
- Le'Andria Johnson
- She'nice Johnson
- Deon Kipping
- Donnie McClurkin
- William Murphy
- Jason Nelson
- Tasha Page-Lockhart
- Marvin Sapp
- Richard Smallwood
- Hezekiah Walker
- The Walls Group

== See also ==
- List of record labels
- Jive Label Group
- Zomba Group of Companies
