= Tye Tribbett =

American singer

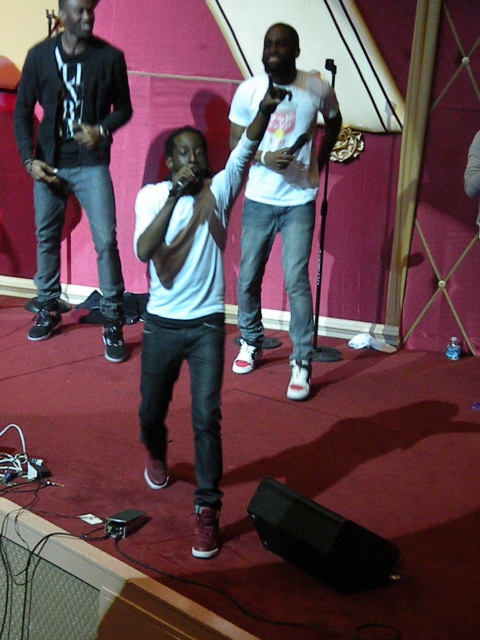

Background information
- Born: January 26, 1976 (age 50)
- Origin: Camden, New Jersey, U.S.
- Genre: Gospel music
- Occupations: Songwriter; record producer; music director; singer
- Instruments: Vocals, keyboard, keytar and drums
- Years active: 1996–present
- Member of: Greater Anointing
- Website: tyetribbettworldwide.com

Thomas Tyrone "Tye" Tribbett (born January 26, 1976) is an American gospel music songwriter, composer, producer, singer, and multi-instrumental musician. Tye Tribbett is best known for his blending in various subgenres in Gospel Music, which each aim and vision of his music serving the specific era it is in. He is also best known for serving the role of choir director and founder of the Grammy-nominated and Stellar Award-winning gospel choir Tye Tribbett & G.A. (short for 'Greater Anointing.'), during the 1990s and the 2000s.

== Biography ==
=== Early life ===
Tribbett was born on January 26, 1976, in Camden, New Jersey. He was raised in Apostolic Pentecostal El Bethel church in Camden, New Jersey. His parents were Bishop Thomas Tyrone Tribbett and Neicy Tribbett, who both serve roles in churches, as well as Neicy Tribbett being a disc jockey in the Philadelphia and New York area.

Tye Tribbett learned how to play keys when he was 5 years old and grew up playing keys in his church. During his teenage years, he played piano for various community choirs including Steve Middleton and the Tri-State Mass Choir and the Edwin Hawkins Music & Arts Seminar.

=== 1996 - 2002: Early Days of Greater Anointing (G.A) ===
In 1996, he created "Greater Anointing," a choir consisting of associated family and friends who were creating songs. From the very beginning, Tye Tribbett had seen how the choir would progress over time. According to his words, "That first rehearsal blew my mind....The musicianship, the quality of the voices and the spirit of the choir, the character of everybody I knew that this was it. I knew that this is what I was supposed to be doing." Tye Tribbett took the role of compositions, songwriting, arranging, choir directing, and with elements of him singing and directing the choreography.

Later on that year, the group won the McDonald's Gospel Choir Competition. In 1997, they won the regional and national awards of the Wrigley's Gospel Choir Competition.

Tye Tribbett and G.A. started garnering attention and acclaim across the church circuit within the Philadelphia area and across the metro Northeastern US; they were particularly known for their high-energy performances which caught the attention of many fans and industry people.

The group eventually was recruited by multi-Grammy award winning producers, Buster and Shavoni, who were producing the soundtrack to the 1998 DreamWorks animated film, The Prince of Egypt. The group was invited to perform on the track "Let Go, Let God" on the inspirational edition with fellow future gospel mainstays - Mary Mary. The success of the movie and soundtrack catapulted the group to mainstream success and got themselves rooted in the music industry.

The group toured with Faith Hill in 2000, leading to work with Will Smith, Usher, Don Henley, Justin Timberlake, and Sting. They also worked with neo-soul and R&B artists such as Jill Scott, India Arie, John Mellencamp, Musiq Soulchild and The Roots. They also appeared on Common's "Electric Circus”, Jessica Simpsons' Christmas project, and has producing and vocal credits on Justin Timberlake's 2002 smash hit "Cry Me A River".

The group released their first album "Ideas and Concepts" in 2000, independently.

=== 2002 - 2009: Tye Tribbett and G.A - mainstream success ===
A showcase with Philadelphia neo-soul performer Vivian Green propelled Tye to the forefront when his keyboard skills and buoyant showmanship were recognized by some key players in the music industry. Tye was signed soon thereafter to Columbia Records.

After a period of recording, on June 8, 2004, Tye Tribbett and G.A. released their major label debut album "Life". It debuted number 6 on the Billboard US Gospel charts. Major features from this record included "No Way" and "Everything". Life also included a rare turn from gospel jazz singer and labelmate Kim Burrell on "You Can Change," and John P. Kee on "My Joy." A further string of performances at various television performances, had the given a high reputation of the choir, being known high energy performances, and a polished sound from the band, known as Soundcheck.

For the follow-up to Life, Tribbett & G.A. had commenced their first live recording on December 3, 2005 at Deliverance Evangelistic Church in Philadelphia, Pennsylvania. During preparations for the live recording of their second album, G.A. were hit with the news of death of one of their members, Dr. Kenneth Riddle, in a car crash in August 2005. Two others close to the choir also died. All three deaths occurred within the five months leading up to the live concert recording. Rather than cancel or postpone the recording, the group turned to prayer and persevered with their preparations. Listening to the voice of faith within, Tye stepped out and challenged G.A. to consecrate themselves, forsaking any revenue from secular music for one year, relying solely on the Lord to provide. Everyone else in G.A. accepted the challenge. The result was Victory Live!, released in May 2006

Victory Live! was a massive success and became one of the most celebrated gospel albums of the 2000s. The album debuted at Billboard Top Gospel Albums chart at #1 - a first for Tribbett. It generated the #1 Gospel Radio single, "Victory," and earned Tribbett two Stellar Award wins and three Grammy nominations -- Best Gospel Performance ("Victory"); Best Gospel Song ("Victory"); and Best Contemporary R&B Gospel Album.

Continued success came with the third release, Stand Out which was recorded live at the Rock Church International, in Virginia Beach, Virginia in August 2007 and was released in May 2008. The album featured appearances by Kierra Sheard and Kim Burrell. Standout tracks included "Chasing After You", "Let Us Worship" and "Look Up".

In late 2009, Tye Tribbett had retired G.A., after personal and public complexities during the final year of the choir. It was billed, of how the disbandment would also be the allowance for the singers to be focused in their own careers, jobs, and personal matters.

=== Solo Career (2010 - present) ===
In 2010, Tribbett released his first project without the ensemble, titled, Fresh, which went #1 on the US Billboard Gospel chart. The album had departed, into a further mainstream influenced sound, with blend of Pop, Techno, and CCM.

After a two-city live recording during the summer of 2012, this led to his fifth album Greater Than which was released on August 6, 2013. His first album for Motown Gospel, and his 3 consecutive #1 record, the album was critically acclaimed. The record included return of the considered-sound that have been compared to that of on Victory Live!, while featuring elements of a more "polished" production that was in Fresh and Stand Out. Notable signature features from the record included, "If He Did It Before (Same God)" and "He Turned It". Greater Than earned him his first two Grammy awards, including Best Gospel Album, in 2014.

After years of touring, in 2017, he released "The Bloody Win", recorded live at The Redemption Center in Greenville, South Carolina in 2016.

Tribbett released All Things New, in both its mostly studio format in 2022 and a 2023 live recording of the album titled All Things New - Live in Orlando, a live recorded album featuring live performances of tracks on his 2022 studio album of the same name, as well as several songs from previous works throughout his career. He won another Grammy for Best Gospel Album.

=== Church ===
Tribbett and Shanté, his wife, pastor the Live Church in Orlando, Florida.

== Personal life ==
He is married to Shanté Tribbett, who was a member of Greater Anointing, and they have two daughters together.

He is the co-founder and pastor of Live church Orlando, alongside his wife who also serves as co-founder and pastor. He also has a brother, Thaddaeus, who is part of the band "Soundcheck" and is now gigging for various artists. Tribbett also has two sisters; DeShantel Tribbett-Robinson and, DeMaris Tribbett-Toy, who sang in Greater Anointing.

Tribbett loves to spend time with his family and engage in upper body workouts.

In April 2020, Tribbett sent a message to people during the coronavirus pandemic with a song "We Gon' Be Alright", he fused Kendrick Lamar's hit track Alright into the song.

== The Come Up with Tye Tribbett ==
The Come Up with Tye Tribbett is an energetic and inspirational one hour daily radio show designed for R&B/hip hop, rhythmic and gospel/inspirational stations, featuring the biggest hits from artists such as Jonathan McReynolds, Lecrae, The Hamiltones and more. The show is distributed by SupeRadio.

== Discography ==
=== Albums ===
List of albums, with selected chart positions and sales figures
Title	Album details	Peak chart positions		
Title	Album details	US	US Gospel	UK Christ. & Gospel
Ideas & Concepts	Released: 2000; Label:	—	—	—
Life	Released: June 8, 2004; Label: Columbia (#CK 90549)	—	6	—
Victory Live!	Released: May 23, 2006; Label: Columbia (#4903252)	64	1	—
Stand Out	Released: May 6, 2008; Label: Columbia (#88697161142)	16	1	—
Fresh	Released: October 19, 2010; Label: Columbia (#88697597832)	60	1	—
Greater Than	Released: August 6, 2013; Label: Integrity, Motown, EMI (#5099972195727)	9	1	6
The Bloody Win	Released: October 13, 2017; Label: Motown Gospel (#002371602)	—	1	—
All Things New	Release: July 8, 2022; Label: Motown (#003433702)	—	2	—
All Things New: Live In Orlando	Release: March 3, 2023; Label: Motown Gospel, Tye Tribbett Worldwide, Capitol CMG	—	11	—
Only on the Road(live)	Release: August 8th, 2025; Label: Freligious Music			

=== Extended Plays ===
- Anyhow! - EP (2021)
- Pandemic Praise! - EP (2021)
- Work It Out! - EP (2021)

=== Singles ===
==== As a lead artist ====
Title	Year	Peak chart positions		Album
Title	Year	US Gospel	US Adult R&B	Album
"Everything Part I, Part II"	2005	6	—	Victory Live!
"Victory"	2006	1	—	Victory Live!
"Stand Out"	2008	21	—	Stand Out
"Hold On"	2008	17	—	Stand Out
"Fresh"	2010	—	—	Fresh
"Keep Me"	2010	16	—	Fresh
"Little Drummer Boy"	2012	—	—	Little Drummer Boy
"If He Did It Before ...Same God"	2013	3	38	Greater Than
"He Turned It"	2013	11	—	Greater Than
"What Can I Do"	2014	17	—	Greater Than
"Work It Out"	2016	4	—	The Bloody Win
"Live!"	2018	19	—	The Bloody Win
"We Gon' Be Alright"	2020	2	—	Kingdom Come
"Anyhow"	2021	10	—	Anyhow!
"New"	2022	11	—	All Things New
"Get Up"	2022	20	—	All Things New
"Only One Night Tho"	2023	8	—	All Things New: Live In Orlando
"—" denotes items which were not released in that country or failed to chart.

==== As a featured artist ====
List of singles, as a featured artist, with selected chart positions, showing year released and album name
Title	Year	Peak chart positions	Album
Title	Year	US Gospel	Album
"We Are Victorious" (Donnie McClurkin featuring Tye Tribbett)	2014	7	Duets
"Chasing Me Down" (Israel & New Breed featuring Tye Tribbett)	2016	15	Chasing Me Down
"You" (Snoop Dogg Presents Tye Tribbett)	2018	20	Bible of Love
"—" denotes items which were not released in that country or failed to chart.

== Awards and nominations ==
=== Dove Awards ===
Year	Nominee / work	Category	Result	Ref.
2026	"Yahweh Flow"	Gospel Worship Recorded Song of the Year	Pending	
2026	Only on the Road	Contemporary Gospel Album of the Year	Pending	

=== Stellar Music Awards ===
Year	Nominee / work	Category	Result	Ref.
2026	Himself	Artist of the Year	Nominated	
2026	Himself	Male Artist of the Year	Nominated	
