= West Angeles Church of God in Christ =

Holiness Pentecostal Christian church in Los Angeles, California, United States

Coordinates: 34.023178°N 118.334298°W

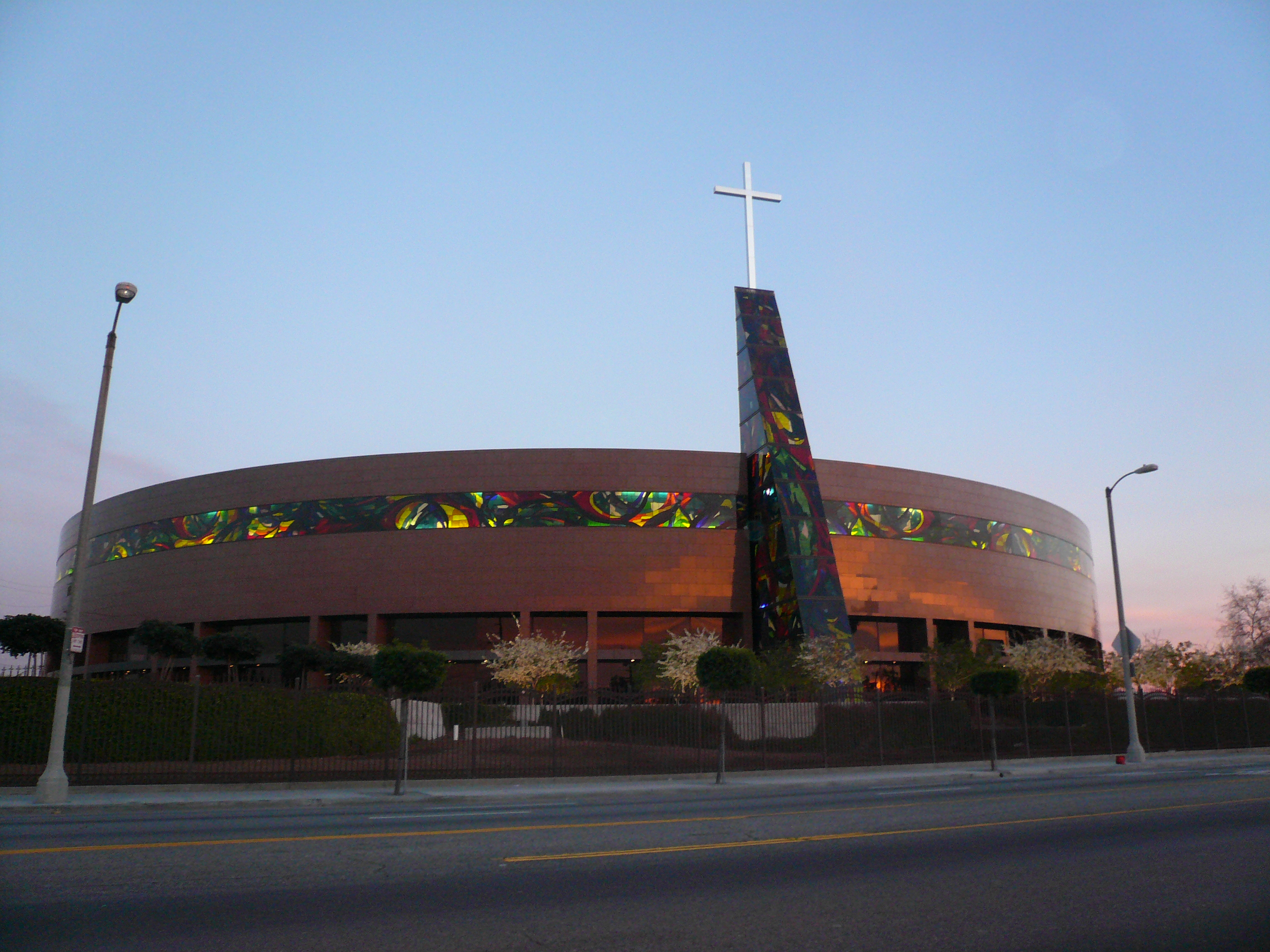
- West Angeles Church of God in Christ
- Location: Jefferson Park; Los Angeles, California
- Country: United States
- Denomination: Church of God in Christ
- Website: westa.org

History
- Founded: 1943
- Founder: Elder Clarence E. Church

West Angeles Church of God in Christ is a Holiness Pentecostal megachurch located in the Jefferson Park neighborhood of Los Angeles, and a member of the Church of God in Christ.

== History ==
It was founded by Elder Clarence E. Church in 1943. The first sanctuary was located on Adams Boulevard, near the Santa Monica Freeway. In 1969, after Elder Church's death, Charles E. Blake took over as the pastor of West Angeles.

In 1981 it opened a new building at 3045 Crenshaw Boulevard in the Jefferson Park neighborhood of Los Angeles. It included a 1,000-seat auditorium.

In 1999, it dedicated a new building including a 5,000-seat auditorium at 3600 Crenshaw Boulevard. Under Blake's leadership, the church grew from 40 members to over 24,000.

In 2013, the city approved a motion to name the intersection of Crenshaw and Jefferson Boulevards after Blake.

In 2019 it sold its buildings at 3045 Crenshaw Boulevard to fund the construction of a Family Life Center behind the building at 3600 Crenshaw Boulevard.

In 2022 Charles Blake II became senior pastor.
