= Charles Jenkins (American Gospel musician) =

American gospel musician (born 1975)

- Born: Charles Jenkins; December 14, 1975 (age 50); St. Petersburg, Florida, U.S.
- Genres: Gospel, traditional black gospel, urban contemporary gospel
- Occupations: Singer, songwriter
- Instruments: Vocals, singer-songwriter
- Years active: 2012–present
- Labels: Inspired People, EMI Gospel, Motown Gospel
- Website: charlesjenkins.com

Charles C. Jenkins II (born December 14, 1975) is an American gospel singer, songwriter, and minister. He started his music career in 2012 with the release of The Best of Both Worlds by Inspired People and EMI Gospel. This would be his Billboard magazine breakthrough release. His second album, Any Given Sunday, was released by Inspired People and Motown Gospel in 2015. The album again placed on the Billboard magazine charts.

== Early life ==
Jenkins was born on December 14, 1975, in St. Petersburg, Florida, United States, as Charles Jenkins II. He is a graduate of both Moody Bible Institute and Trinity Evangelical Divinity School. After college, he became the senior pastor of Fellowship Missionary Baptist Church of Chicago, where Clay Evans was the founder. He served there from 2000 to 2019. He serves as a Ministry Partner at Vanderbloemen Search Group.

== Music career ==
His music career got started in April 2012, with the release of the single “Awesome.” It was then followed by the album The Best of Both Worlds by Inspired People and EMI Gospel on June 12, 2012. This album was his breakthrough release on the Billboard magazine charts at No. 41 on The Billboard 200 and at No. 1 on the Gospel Albums chart. The album was rated four stars out of five by AllMusic, and an eight out of ten by Cross Rhythms. His subsequent album, Any Given Sunday, was released on March 17, 2015. The album charted on The Billboard 200 at No. 90, and No. 1 on the Gospel Albums chart.

== Discography ==
List of studio albums, with selected chart positions
Title	Album details	Peak chart positions		Sales
Title	Album details	US	US Gos	Sales
The Best of Both Worlds	Released: June 12, 2012; Label: Inspired People/EMI Gospel; CD, digital download	41	1	US: 62,000
Any Given Sunday	Released: March 17, 2015; Label: Inspired People/Motown Gospel; CD, digital download	90	1	
