= Anita Wilson =

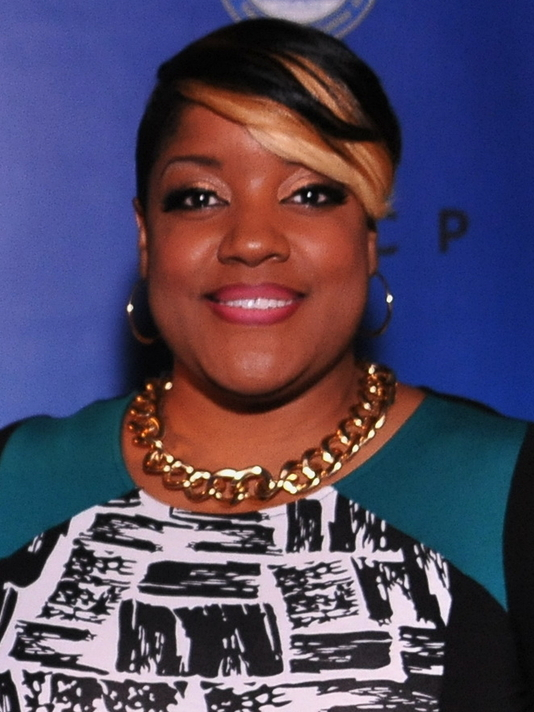

Background information
- Born: Anita M. Wilson; June 19, 1976 (age 49); East St. Louis, Illinois, U.S.
- Origin: Chicago, Illinois; Atlanta, Georgia
- Genres: Christian, Gospel
- Occupations: Songwriter, record producer, and singer
- Instrument: Vocals
- Years active: 2006 – present
- Website: www.msanitawilson.com

Anita M. Wilson (born June 19, 1976) is an American gospel music singer, songwriter, and music producer. She is known for her hit single, "Jesus Will" from her debut album, Worship Soul.

== Biography ==
Anita M. Wilson was born on June 19, 1976, and also raised in East St. Louis. After a 10-year career as a backup singer for contemporary gospel songwriter/producer Donald Lawrence, Wilson recorded her first solo album, Worship Soul in 2012. The first single released from Worship Soul was "Speechless".

On April 29, 2014, Wilson released the single "That's What He's Done For Me" from her second studio album Vintage Worship. In 2015, her second studio album, Vintage Worship, was nominated for the Grammy Award for Best Gospel Album, losing to Erica Campbell's HELP.

Wilson is an honorary member of Zeta Phi Beta

== Discography ==
- Worship Soul (2012)
- Vintage Worship (2014)
- Sunday Song (2017)
- Soul Sister (2021)
