= Jason Nelson (musician) =

American musician

Bishop Jason Nelson
- Born: Jason Albert Nelson; November 10, 1974 (age 51); Baltimore, Maryland
- Genres: Black gospel, urban contemporary gospel
- Occupations: Singer, songwriter
- Instruments: Vocals, singer-songwriter
- Years active: 2005–present
- Labels: RCA Inspiration, Verity
- Website: jnelsononline.com

Jason Albert Nelson (born November 10, 1974) is an American urban contemporary gospel artist and musician. He started his music career, in 2005, with the release of, I Shall Live, by Jaelyn Son Records. His second album, Place of Worship, was released in 2008. The first album with a major label, Shifting the Atmosphere, with Verity Records, was released in 2012, and this charted on two Billboard charts The Billboard 200 and the Top Gospel Albums. His second album with a major label, Jesus Revealed, with RCA Inspiration, was released in 2015, which this charted on the two aforementioned charts.

== Early life ==
Nelson was born on November 10, 1974, as Jason Aaron Nelson, in Baltimore, Maryland, to Bishop James D. Nelson Sr., who was the pastor at the Greater Bethlehem Temple Church from 1977 until 2007, and Sister Bessie, and he was born just moments after his twin brother Jonathan Nelson. He has an older brother, who is Reverend James D. Nelson Jr., and he has an older sister.

== Music career ==
His music career got started in 2005, with the release of I Shall Live on August 10, 2005 by Jaelyn Son Records. The second album would come out on September 9, 2008, Place of Worship, that was released independently. His first major label release, Shifting the Atmosphere, came out on May 22, 2012, with Verity Records. This album would be his breakthrough release on the Billboard charts, and it would place at No. 79 on The Billboard 200 and No. 3 on the Top Gospel Albums chart. Ben Ratliff, writes for The New York Times that this was his preference for Tunes for the Road back in 2012. The album would receive a three and a half star review from New Release Tuesday, while Cross Rhythms rated it an eight out of ten, and Andy Kellman at AllMusic says it is "a bright live recording". He released, Jesus Revealed, on January 20, 2015, with RCA Inspiration. The album would chart on The Billboard 200 at No. 141, while it attained the top position on the Top Gospel Albums chart. This album would be awarded a four and a half star review by New Release Tuesday, while Kellman at AllMusic recognizes, "This is another live recording from Jason Nelson, who once again keeps his fellow worshippers engaged through his contagious conviction, interactions, and deeper than standard lyrical content."

== Personal life ==
Nelson resides in the Baltimore, Maryland area, with his wife Tonya. The couple joined in matrimony on May 10, 1997. He has a daughter, Jaelyn Paris Nelson, and a son, Jason Christopher Nelson. Nelson is the pastor of his father's church, The Tabernacle at Greater Bethlehem Temple (formerly Greater Bethlehem Temple), and was elevated to that position on July 7, 2007.

== Discography ==
=== Studio albums ===
List of studio albums, with selected chart positions
Title	Album details	Peak chart positions	
Title	Album details	US	US Gos
I Shall Live	Released: August 10, 2005; Label: Jaelyn Son; CD, digital download	–	–
Place of Worship	Released: September 9, 2008; Label: Independent; CD, digital download	–	–
Shifting the Atmosphere	Released: May 22, 2012; Label: Verity; CD, digital download	79	3
Jesus Revealed	Released: January 20, 2015; Label: RCA Inspiration; CD, digital download	141	1
The Answer	Released: May 18, 2018; Label: RCA Inspiration; CD, digital download	–	–
