= Judith Christie McAllister =

American singer-songwriter

Judith Christie McAlister
- Also known as: Dr. Judith Christie McAllister
- Born: Judith F. Christie; September 29, 1963 (age 62); Harlem, New York
- Origin: Los Angeles, California
- Genres: Gospel, traditional black gospel, urban contemporary gospel, contemporary Christian
- Occupations: Singer, songwriter, pianist
- Instruments: Vocals, singer-songwriter, piano
- Years active: 2001–present
- Labels: Judah Music, Artemis, Shanachie
- Website: neverendingworship.com

Judith Christie McAllister (born September 29, 1963 as Judith F. Christie) is an American Pentecostal gospel singer, songwriter, and musician. She is the leader of Never Ending Worship, and she was the president of the International Music Department for the Church of God in Christ from 2009 until 2021. Her first album, Send Judah First, was released by Judah Music Records in 2000. She released, Raise the Praise, with Judah Music Records in 2003. The third album, In His Presence: Live!, was released in 2006, and this was a Billboard magazine breakthrough release upon the Gospel Albums and two others. Her fourth album, Sound the Trumpet, was released in 2011 with Shanachie Records, and this charted upon the aforementioned chart.

== Early life ==
She was born in Harlem, on September 29, 1963, as Judith F. Christie, as the daughter of a minister from Jamaica and her mother, who is from Barbados. Her mother being a pianist at her father's church growing up gave her the impetus to learn how to play the piano and become a pianist in her own right. She went to Oral Roberts University in the mid-1980s.

== Music career ==
In 1992, she became the music director at West Angeles Church of God in Christ (COGIC). In 2004, she became a vice-president for the International Music Department (COGIC) under the leadership of Iris Stevenson. Finally in 2009, she was appointed the president of the International Music Department (COGIC) by Presiding Bishop Charles E. Blake Sr. Her music recording career commenced in 2001, with her album, Send Judah First, and it was released by her label Judah Records on January 30, 2001. She released, Raise the Praise, on January 27, 2003 again by her label Judah Records. The third album, In His Presence: Live!, was released on May 30, 2006 by Artemis Records, and this was her breakthrough release upon the Billboard magazine Gospel Albums chart at No. 10, while placing on two more charts. The subsequent album, Sound the Trumpet, released by Shanachie Records in 2011, and this charted at No. 13 on the aforementioned chart.

== Personal life ==
She is married to Darin McAllister, and together they reside in Los Angeles, California, with their children. She serves as the minister of music under the presiding bishop of the Church of God in Christ, Charles E. Blake, church West Angeles.

== Discography ==
List of studio albums, with selected chart positions
| Title | Album details | Peak chart positions |
| Title | Album details | US Gos |
|---|---|---|
| Send Judah First | Released: January 30, 2001; Label: Judah; CD, digital download | – |
| Raise the Praise | Released: January 27, 2003; Label: Judah; CD, digital download | – |
| In His Presence: Live! | Released: May 30, 2006; Label: Artemis; CD, digital download | 10 |
| Sound the Trumpet | Released: 2011; Label: Shanachie; CD, digital download | 13 |
