= VaShawn Mitchell =

American gospel singer and songwriter (born 1976)

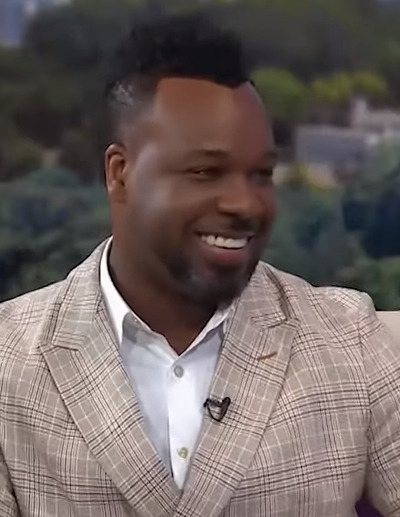
- Mitchell in 2019

Background information
- Born: November 19, 1976 (age 49); Harvey, Illinois, U.S.
- Origin: Chicago, Illinois, U.S.
- Genre: Gospel
- Occupations: singer, songwriter
- Instrument: vocals
- Website: vashawnmitchell.com

VaShawn Mitchell (born November 19, 1976) is an American gospel artist.

== Early life ==
Born and raised in Harvey, Illinois, Mitchell graduated from Thornton High School and earned a degree in psychology from college.

== Career ==
Mitchell launched his career under the guidance of Lonnie Hunter at St. Mark Baptist Church. By age 20, his musical gifts caught the eye of Bishop Larry Trotter, who invited him to join the music ministry at Chicago's Sweet Holy Spirit Church. He spent nearly a decade as Minister of Music, managing all facets of the department while producing influential recordings such as "Don't Last" and "My Worship Is for Real", which became church staples. During this period, he also released his debut solo project, So Satisfied.

In 2007, Mitchell began serving as Minister of Music at Higher Living Christian Church in Atlanta, GA.

Mitchell has written gospel songs, including Smokie Norful ("Just Can't Stop"), Vanessa Bell Armstrong ("Help"), Ricky Dillard ("One More Chance" from Unplugged...The Way Church Used to Be), Donnie McClurkin ("See the Goodness"), and Bishop Paul S. Morton ("Cry Your Last Tear").

In 2012, Mitchell founded the Norman Youth and Arts Foundation in honor of his grandfather. The organization sponsors summer arts camps for youth in the Chicago area. He is also one of the few Gospel artists who serves as an active spokesperson for the Big Brothers Big Sisters Foundation.

On December 31, 2016, it was announced that VaShawn Mitchell had been appointed General Overseer of Music & Worship Arts at Mount Zion Baptist Church in Nashville, Tennessee.

== Recognition ==
As a recording artist, Mitchell has released over a dozen albums, earning two Grammy® Award nominations and scoring seven Billboard Top Ten Gospel Airplay hits. His catalog includes four No. 1 singles—“See the Goodness,” “Lifted Up,” “Joy,” and “Nobody Greater,” which held the top spot on the Billboard Gospel Songs chart for nine weeks. Billboard named “Nobody Greater,” which also reached No. 18 on the Adult R&B chart, the most-played gospel single of 2011, and it was certified Gold in 2019.

Mitchell was the most nominated artist at the 27th Annual Stellar Awards; receiving 11 nods and walking away with 6 statues.

He was nominated for 2 Grammy Awards at the 53rd Annual Grammy Awards for Best Gospel Performance for "Nobody Greater" and Best Contemporary R&B Gospel Album Triumphant.

Triumphant was also acknowledged by the Gospel Music Association's Dove Awards with 2 nominations for the album Triumphant and hit-single, "Nobody Greater".

His single “Turning Around for Me” from the follow-up album Created4This climbed into Gospel's Top 5 and reached the Top 25 on the R&B charts.

Mitchell was honored by his hometown of Harvey, Illinois when they named one of the streets in his neighborhood "VaShawn Mitchell Street".

In 2013, Mitchell was a judge for the seven-city "How Sweet The Sound" gospel competition tour.

Mitchell is an honorary member of Phi Beta Sigma fraternity inducted during the 2023 Houston Conclave of the Fraternity.

== Discography ==
So Satisfied (1998)
Another Chance (2002) as VaShawn Mitchell & New Image Ensemble
Believe in Your Dreams (2005)
Promises (2007) as VaShawn Mitchell and Friends
Triumphant (2010)
My Songbook (2011) (compilation album)
Created4This (2012)
Unstoppable (2014) (Some album covers read Unstoppable Extended Play on this 14-track LP.)
Secret Place (Live in South Africa) (2016)
Cross Music (EP) (2018)
Elements (2019)
Chapter X: See the Goodness (2023)
Soundcheck (2025)
