= William McDowell (musician) =

American gospel musician (born 1976)

- Born: William David McDowell; August 31, 1976 (age 49); Cincinnati, Ohio
- Origin: Orlando, Florida
- Genres: Contemporary Christian music; gospel; praise & worship
- Occupations: Singer, songwriter
- Instrument: Vocals
- Years active: 2009–present
- Label: Integrity Music
- Website: williammcdowellmusic.com

William David McDowell (born August 31, 1976) is an American gospel musician. He started his music career, in 2009, with the release of, As We Worship, by Entertainment One Music. This album would chart on three Billboard charts Gospel Albums, Independent Albums and Heatseekers Albums. His second album, Arise, was released in 2011 with Entertainment One. The album charted three Billboard charts again, this time The Billboard 200, Gospel Albums and Independent Albums. His third album, Withholding Nothing, was released in 2013, with Entertainment One. This album would chart on three charts The Billboard 200, Gospel Albums, and Independent Albums. He was nominated for Grammy Award for Best Gospel Album, for his third album.

== Early life ==
McDowell was born in Cincinnati, Ohio, on August 31, 1976, as William David McDowell. His father, Lewis, and mother, Pauline (née Leggette), were both born in North Carolina.

== Music career ==
His music career got started in 2009, with the release of As We Worship on February 3, 2009, by Entertainment One Music. This album would be his Billboard breakthrough release because it charted on the Gospel Albums at No. 3, on the Independent Albums at No. 21, and on the Heatseekers Albums at No. 32. William Ruhlmann rated the album three stars on behalf of AllMusic, while Cross Rhythms' Doug Holland rated it a perfect ten. The second album, Arise, was released on November 8, 2011, by Entertainment One. It would chart on The Billboard 200 at No. 61, on the Gospel Albums at No. 1, and on the Independent Albums at No. 13. Steve Leggett from AllMusic rated the album three and a half stars. His third album, Withholding Nothing, was released on November 5, 2013, by Entertainment One. This would chart on The Billboard 200 at No. 28, on the Gospel Albums at No. 1, and on the Independent Albums at No. 4. Steve Leggett at AllMusic rated the album three stars, while New Release Tuesday's Dwayne Lacy rated the album four out of five stars. The album was nominated for Grammy Award for Best Gospel Album at the 57th Annual Grammy Awards. He is nominated at the 30th Stellar Awards, for the Traditional Male Vocalist of the Year, and his album, Withholding Nothing, is nominated for the Traditional CD of the Year. His fourth album, Sounds of Revival, was released on January 22, 2016, from Entertainment One Music.

== Personal life ==
McDowell moved to Orlando, Florida in his twenties to attend Full Sail University, where he received his degree in Entertainment Business. He was mentored by Ron Kenoly, when he was his music director. After college, his mentorship continued under the tutelage of Sam Hinn, while he was in the capacity of Worship Pastor at The Gathering Place Church. In May 2009, McDowell married LaTae; they reside outside of Orlando, Florida, with their children. He is also the pastor at Deeper Fellowship church located in Orlando, Florida.

== Discography ==
List of albums, with selected chart positions
| Title | Details | Peak chart positions | | | | | | |
| Title | Details | US | US Gospel | US Indie | UK Down. | UK R&B | UK Indie | UK C&G |
|---|---|---|---|---|---|---|---|---|
| As We Worship | Released: February 3, 2009; Label: Entertainment One; Formats: CD, digital download | — (Note: As We Worship did not enter the Billboard 200, but peaked at number 32 on the Heatseekers Albums chart.>) | 3 | 21 | — | — | — | — |
| Arise | Released: November 8, 2011; Label: Entertainment One; Formats: CD, digital download | 63 | 1 | 13 | — | — | — | — |
| Withholding Nothing | Released: November 5, 2013; Label: Entertainment One; Formats: CD, digital download | 28 | 1 | 4 | — | — | — | 5 |
| Sounds of Revival | Released: January 22, 2016; Label: Entertainment One; Formats: CD, digital download | 46 | 1 | 2 | 87 | 22 | 15 | 1 |
| Sounds of Revival II: Deeper | Released: March 3, 2017; Label: Entertainment One; Formats: CD, digital download | 91 | 1 | 6 | 82 | — | 14 | — |
| The Cry: A Live Worship Experience | Released: September 20, 2019; Label: Entertainment One; Formats: CD, digital download, streaming | 172 | 1 | 6 | — | — | — | 4 |
| Dreams, Revelations and Moments | Released: July 31, 2026; Label: Delivery Room Music/Integrated Music; Formats: CD, digital download, streaming | — | 10 | — | — | — | — | 14 |
