= Bishop William Murphy III =

American Gospel Recording Artist & Pastor

Bishop William Murphy
- Also known as: Bishop William Murphy
- Born: William Henry Murphy; August 2, 1973 (age 53); Detroit, Michigan
- Origin: Atlanta, Georgia
- Genres: gospel, Christian R&B, contemporary R&B, traditional black gospel
- Occupations: Singer, songwriter, pastor
- Instrument: vocals
- Years active: 2001–present
- Labels: Epic, Central South, Verity, Motown Gospel
- Spouse: Pastor Danielle Murphy (m. 1999)
- Website: williammurphy.org

William Henry Murphy III (born August 2, 1973) is an American gospel recording artist, pastor, and bishop. He started his music career in 2005, with the release of All Day on Epic Records. This album was listed on the Billboard Gospel Albums chart. His second album, The Sound, was released in 2007 on Central South, and was listed on the Top Gospel Albums chart as well. He self-released We Are One in 2011. This album was listed on the Top Gospel Albums chart, along with the Heatseekers Albums chart. His fourth album, God Chaser, was released in 2013 on Verity. The album reached the Gospel Albums chart, as well as the Billboard 200. Murphy is founder and lead pastor of the dReam Center Church of Atlanta.

== Early life and education ==
William Murphy was born in Detroit, Michigan on August 2, 1973. His father and grandfather are pastors/bishops of the Full Gospel Baptist Church Fellowship. At a young age, he recognized his divine calling to preach the Gospel of Jesus Christ while he attended Ford High School in Detroit, where he was a member of their gospel choir. And at the age of 23, he was ordained as an Elder under his father, Bishop WIlliam Murphy, J.R. at Greater Ebenezer Missionary Baptist Church.

In 2024, Murphy earned his Masters of Divinity from Virginia Union University, and is a member of the Omega Psi Phi fraternity.

== Career ==
Murphy's music career began with the release of Praise Is What I do via Shekinah Glory Ministry under the leadership of Apostle H. D. Wilson of Valley Kingdom Ministries in Oak Forest, Illinois. Originally, it was a song he had written for his father, Bishop William Murphy, J.R. whose church choir was also called the Shekinah Glory Singers. He was asked by Wilson for Murphy to come and minister at his church on a Sunday morning. Murphy agreed.

According to Murphy, "I arrived home the next day, and my phone was blowing up! 'Shekinah Glory’s getting ready to do a recording and we want to record “Praise is What I Do!' I suggested other songs I thought were better, but they wanted ‘Praise is What I Do!’”

The song, along with Shekinah Glory's debut album was released in August of 2000 and it landed top ten on Billboard's top gospel albums chart.

In 2001, Murphy and his wife, Danielle Murphy, and their two children moved to Atlanta where Murphy became the worship minister at New Birth Missionary Cathedral. There, he traveled ministering in song and preaching the gospel until he accepted the call to pastor. It was also at New Birth where he recorded his debut album, All Day. All Day was released independently in 2005 but after quickly signing to Epic Records under Sony Music it was rereleased. It peaked at #22 on the Billboard Top Gospel Albums chart.

In 2006, Murphy launched the dReam Center Church of Atlanta which operates in Panthersville, Georgia. The launch service took place on January 15, 2006, and an estimated 350 people attended. Murphy had anticipated at least 50 attendees to join, but only one person did: Pastor Tasha Cobbs-Leonard. There, she was ordained as an elder, served as the worship minister, and managed their worship and arts department for 14 years. During her time at the dReam Center, Cobbs became a gospel artist in her own right, releasing songs like "Break Every Chain", "For Your Glory", "Put A Praise On It" and "Fill Me Up/Overflow".

His second album, The Sound, was released by Central South Records on May 1, 2007, peaking at No. 23 on the same chart.

His third album, We Are One, was self-released on July 26, 2011, and it peaked at No. 16. It also placed on the Heatseekers Albums at No. 28.

His fourth album, God Chaser, was released on February 5, 2013, by Verity Records. It reached No. 90 on the Billboard 200, and placed at No. 3 on the Gospel Albums chart. God Chaser was nominated for Grammy Award for Best Gospel Album at the 56th Annual Grammy Awards. Andy Kellman, writing for AllMusic, said that some of the tracks on this album are "potent numbers", while Cross Rhythms rated the album a seven out of ten. It was also recorded live at New Birth Cathedral.

Since then, he released 3 more albums: Demonstrate (2016), Settle Here (2019), and Worship & Justice (2022). On December 4, 2021, the live recording for Worship & Justice marked The dReam Center's first mass gathering since the COVID-19 pandemic. The album though was a response to the ongoing Black Lives Matter movement. Its ultimate goal was to "invite Jesus into the conversation".

In 2024, Bishop Murphy announced that he was partnering with Motown Gospel to release a new album titled Payback: The Retribution Record. It was released on July 4, 2025, and its lead single, Double, was released on January 10, 2025. Payback was recorded at the dReam Center Church of Atlanta in November 2023.

During the week of July 7, 2025, his single Double reached number one on the Billboard Gospel Airplay chart. In that same week, Payback debuted at number seven on Billboard's top gospel album chart.

Bishop Murphy serves as the presiding bishop of worship and executive secretary of the Full Gospel Baptist Church Fellowship.

== Discography ==
- All Day (2005)
- The Sound (2007)
- We Are One (2011)
- God Chaser (2013)
- Demonstrate (2016)
- Settle Here (2019)
- Worship & Justice (2022)
- Payback (2025)
