= 34th Annual Stellar Awards =

- Official poster
- Date: March 29, 2019; 6:00 p.m. PT
- Location: Orleans Arena, Las Vegas
- Hosted by: Kirk Franklin

Highlights
- Most awards: Jonathan McReynolds (8)
- Most nominations: Jonathan McReynolds (8)

Television/radio coverage
- Network: BET

The 34th Annual Stellar Awards was held on March 29, 2019, at the Orleans Arena in Las Vegas, and later aired for the first time on American digital cable and satellite television network BET on April 19. Musician Kirk Franklin hosted the ceremony.

The ceremony recognized the best gospel music recordings, compositions, and artists of the eligibility year, which ran in 2018.

Delores Washington Green of The Caravans was given the Legend Award. James Robinson Jr., Jackie Patillo and Phil Thornton were inducted into the Stellar Honors Hall of Fame. On behalf of Aretha Franklin, the members of Franklin's family were presented with the inaugural Aretha Franklin Icon Award.

Jonathan McReynolds, who received the most nominations, also received the most wins of the night by winning in each of his nominated categories.

== Nominations announcement ==
Nominations were announced during a radio press tour on January 15, 2019.

== Nominations ==
- Please note: The winners are highlighted in bold text and listed first in each category.

=== General ===
Artist of the Year

- **Jonathan McReynolds**
- Jekalyn Carr
- Maranda Curtis
- Todd Dulaney

Song of the Year

- **"Not Lucky, I'm Loved"**
  - **Jonathan McReynolds, Terrell Demetrius Wilson, and Anna B. Warner (songwriters)**
- "Nobody Like You Lord"
  - Maranda Curtis & Anthony Rachel (songwriters)
- "Won't He Do It"
  - Makeba Riddick, Richard Shelton, and Loren Hill (songwriters)
- "You Know My Name" (Live)
  - Tasha Cobbs Leonard & Brenton Brown (songwriters)

CD of the Year

- **Make Room - Jonathan McReynolds**
- Bible of Love - Snoop Dogg
- Open Heaven - Maranda Curtis
- Your Great Name - Todd Dulaney

New Artist of the Year

- **Jabari Johnson**
- Cheryl Thomas-Fortune
- PJ Morgan
- Phil Thompson

=== Vocalist ===
Female Vocalist of the Year (also referred to as the "Albertina Walker Female Vocalist of the Year")

- **Jekalyn Carr**
- Maranda Curtis
- Koryn Hawthorne
- Tori Kelly
- Tasha Page-Lockhart

Contemporary Female Vocalist of the Year

- **Tasha Page-Lockhart**
- Koryn Hawthorne
- Benita Jones
- Tori Kelly

Traditional Female Vocalist of the Year

- **Jekalyn Carr**
- Maranda Curtis
- Tammi Haddon
- Shana Wilson-Williams

Male Vocalist of the Year

- **Jonathan McReynolds**
- Kelontae Gavin
- Tye Tribbett
- Brian Courtney Wilson

Contemporary Male Vocalist of the Year

- **Jonathan McReynolds**
- Todd Dulaney
- Kelontae Gavin
- Tye Tribbett

Traditional Male Vocalist of the Year

- **VaShawn Mitchell**
- Keith "Wonderboy" Johnson
- Earnest Pugh
- Jarell Smalls

=== Group ===
Duo/Chorus of the Year

- **The Walls Group**
- Donald Lawrence & Tri-City
- Isaiah D. Thomas and Elements of Praise
- Judah Band

Contemporary Duo/Chorus of the Year

- **The Walls Group**
- Donald Lawrence & Tri-City
- God's Chosen
- Judah Band

Traditional Duo/Chorus of the Year

- **Keith "Wonderboy" Johnson**
- Gospel Legends
- Jarell Smalls & Company
- Nu Tradition

Quartet of the Year

- **Keith "Wonderboy" Johnson**
- Gospel Legends
- Jarell Smalls & Company
- The Wardlaw Brothers

=== Choir ===
Choir of the Year

- **Bishop Noel Jones & City of Refuge Sanctuary Choir**
- Dexter Walker & Zion Movement
- The Brooklyn Tabernacle Choir
- Vincent Tharpe and Kenosis

Traditional Choir of the Year

- **Bishop Noel Jones & City of Refuge Sanctuary Choir**
- Demetrius West & Jesus Promoters
- Dexter Walker & Zion Movement
- The Brooklyn Tabernacle Choir

Contemporary Choir of the Year

- **New Direction**
- Brent Jones & the Waco Community Choir
- Dr. Alyn E. Waller Presents Fresh Anointing
- Vincent Tharpe and Kenosis

=== Packaging ===
Recorded Music Packaging of the Year

- **Road to DeMaskUs**
  - **Israel Houghton, art director (Israel Houghton)**
- Open Heaven
  - Justin Foster, art director (Maranda Curtis)
- Make Room
  - Keemon Leonard, art director (Jonathan McReynolds)
- One Nation Under God
  - Octavious Holmes, art director (Jekalyn Carr)

=== Production ===
Producer of the Year

- **Make Room**
  - **Jonathan McReynolds and Darryl "Lil Man" Howell, production team (Jonathan McReynolds)**
- The Beautiful Project
  - Kirk Franklin, Ronald Hill, Phil Thornton, Clifton Lockhart, Tasha Page-Lockhart, Myron Butler, Dontaniel Kimbrough, Zeek Listenbee, Cordell Walton, Edward "6Mile JP" Page, Charles "Ollie" Harris, Daniel Bryant, Bryan Popin & AyRon Lewis, production team (Tasha Page-Lockhart)
- The Other Side
  - Kirk Franklin, Ronald Hill, Warryn Campbell, Phil Thornton, production team (The Walls Group)
- Your Great Name
  - Todd Dulaney and Dontaniel Jamel Kimbrough, production team (Todd Dulaney)

=== Urban ===
Urban/Inspirational Single or Performance of the Year

- **"Not Lucky, I'm Loved" - Jonathan McReynolds**
- "Forever" - Jason Nelson
- "Never Alone" - Tori Kelly and Kirk Franklin
- "Reckless Love" - Israel Houghton

Rap/Hip Hop Gospel CD of the Year

- **"God Knows" - Flame**
- "BLSD" - Jor'Dan Armstrong
- "I Ain't Preaching to the Choir" - Miz Tiffany
- "Praise" - Emcee N.I.C.E.

=== Music video ===
Music Video of the Year

- **"Won't He Do It" - Casey Cross**
- "A Great Work" - Matt Reed
- "For My Good" - G. Randy Weston
- "My Life (Grateful)" - Patrick Tohill

=== Miscellaneous CD of the Year ===
Contemporary CD of the Year

- **Make Room - Jonathan McReynolds**
- Bible of Love - Snoop Dogg
- The Higher Experience - Kelontae Gavin
- Your Great Name - Todd Dulaney

Traditional CD of the Year

- **One Nation Under God - Jekalyn Carr**
- A New Season - Jarell Smalls & Company
- Run to the Altar - Bishop Noel Jones & City of Refuge Sanctuary Choir
- The River - Keion D. Henderson

Special Event CD of the Year

- **The Best of Fred Hammond - Fred Hammond**
- Bible of Love - Snoop Dogg
- Evidence - Elevation Collective
- WOW Gospel 2018 - Various Artists

Praise and Worship CD of the Year

- **Your Great Name - Todd Dulaney**
- Everlasting - Shana Wilson-Williams
- The Higher Experience - Kelontae Gavin
- Open Heaven - Maranda Curtis

=== Children's ===
Youth Project of the Year

- **Pure N Heart**
- Christian Bolar
- Personal Praise
- The Children Speak

=== Radio ===
Major Market of the Year

- **WPZE Praise 102.5, Atlanta**
- WGRB Inspiration 1390AM, Chicago
- WNAP 1110 AM, Philadelphia
- WYCA 92.3 FM WPRS-FM, Hammond/Chicago

Large Market of the Year

- **WFMI-FM 100.9 FM, Virginia Beach**
- WJXY 103.5 FM/93.7 FM, Myrtle Beach
- WOKB 1680AM, Orlando
- WXHL 89.1FM, Wilmington

Medium Market of the Year

- **WCGL AM 1360/FM 94.7, Jacksonville**
- WPZZ 104.7 FM, Richmond
- WREJ 101.3FM, Richmond
- WTJZ Praise 104.9FM, Chesapeake

Small Market of the Year

- **WIMG 1300AM, Ewing**
- WDJL-AM 1000, Huntsville
- WEHA GOSPEL 88.7 & 100.3 FM, Egg Harbor
- WHBT 1410 AM & 98.3 FM, Tallahassee

Internet Station of the Year

- **uGospel Radio, http://uGospel.com**
- Gospel Central Radio, http://www.thegospelcentral.com
- SOAR Radio, http://soarradio.com

Hip Hop Station of the Year

- **GH3 Radio - "God's House of Hip Hop," http://www.gh3radio.com**

Gospel Announcer of the Year

- **Dwight Stone, WPZE Praise 102.5, Atlanta, GA**
- Linda Greenwood, WNAA 90.1 FM, Raleigh, NC
- Randi Myles, WDMK-HD2, Detroit, MI
- Sherry Mackey, WHAL 95.7, Memphis, TN

== Category changes ==
For the 34th Annual Stellar Awards, multiple category changes are being made;

- In the Female Vocalist of the Year, the number of nominees was increased from four to five due to a tie in the nomination process.
- The category Instrumental CD of the Year was omitted.
