= Billboard Music Award for Top Gospel Album =

Annual American music award

The Billboard Music Award for Top Gospel Album winners and nominees. This award was introduced in 2016.

== Winners and nominees ==
Listed below are the winners of the award for each year, as well as the other nominees.

Table key
‡	Indicates the winner

Year	Album	Artist	Ref.
2016	Everyday Jesus	Anthony Brown and group therAPy	
2016	Losing My Religion ‡	Kirk Franklin ‡	
2016	One Place Live	Tasha Cobbs	
2016	Life Music: Stage Two	Jonathan McReynolds	
2016	You Shall Live	Marvin Sapp	
2017	Azuna: The Next Generation 2	Hezekiah Walker	
2017	One Way ‡	Tamela Mann ‡	
2017	The Hill	Travis Greene	
2017	Losing My Religion	Kirk Franklin	
2017	One Place Live	Tasha Cobbs Leonard	
2018	A Long Way from Sunday	Anthony Brown & Group TherAPy	
2018	Close	Marvin Sapp	
2018	Crossover: Live from Music City	Travis Greene	
2018	Heart. Passion. Pursuit ‡	Tasha Cobbs Leonard ‡	
2018	You Deserve It	Youthful Praise	
2019	Bible of Love	Snoop Dogg & Various Artists	
2019	Hiding Place ‡	Tori Kelly ‡	
2019	Gospel Greats	Aretha Franklin	
2019	Unstoppable	Koryn Hawthorne	
2019	Make Room	Jonathan McReynolds	
2020	Long, Live, Love	Kirk Franklin	
2020	Jesus Is Born	Sunday Service Choir	
2020	Jesus is King ‡	Kanye West ‡	
2020	Goshen	Donald Lawrence & The Tri-City Singers	
2020	The Cry: A Live Worship Experience	William McDowell	
2021	I AM	Koryn Hawthorne	
2021	Kierra	Kierra Sheard	
2021	Maverick City Vol. 3 Part 1 ‡	Maverick City Music ‡	
2021	Maverick City Vol. 3 Part 2	Maverick City Music	
2021	Royalty: Live at the Ryman	Tasha Cobbs Leonard	
2022	Donda ‡	Kanye West ‡	
2022	Believe For It	CeCe Winans	
2022	Old Church Basement	Elevation Worship & Maverick City Music	
2022	Jubilee: Juneteenth Edition	Maverick City Music	
2022	Move Your Heart	Maverick City Music & Upperroom	
2023	All Things New	Tye Tribbett	
2023	I Go to the Rock: The Gospel Music of Whitney Houston	Whitney Houston	
2023	Imprint (Live in Memphis)	Zacardi Cortez	
2023	Kingdom Book One ‡	Maverick City Music & Kirk Franklin ‡	
2023	My Truth	Jonathan McReynolds	
2024	Cover The Earth: Live in New York	Naomi Raine	
2024	Father's Day	Kirk Franklin	
2024	More Than This	CeCe Winans	
2024	On God	Koryn Hawthorne	
2024	The Maverick Way Complete: Complete Vol 02 ‡	Maverick City Music, Chandler Moore & Naomi Raine ‡	
