= WHBT =

WHBT may refer to:

- WHBT (AM), a defunct radio station (1410 AM) formerly licensed to serve Tallahassee, Florida, United States
- WHBT-FM, a radio station (92.1 FM) licensed to serve Moyock, North Carolina, United States
