= 2017 Billboard Music Awards =

Annual American music awards ceremony

- Date: May 21, 2017
- Location: T-Mobile Arena, Las Vegas, Nevada, United States
- Hosted by: Ludacris; Vanessa Hudgens

Highlights
- Most wins: Drake (13)
- Most nominations: The Chainsmokers and Drake (22 each)

Television/radio coverage
- Network: ABC
- Runtime: 130 minutes
- Viewership: 8.70 million

The 2017 Billboard Music Awards ceremony was held at the T-Mobile Arena in Las Vegas, Nevada on May 21, 2017. The list of nominees was announced on April 10, 2017. Non-televised awards were announced on Billboard website the same day as the main ceremony.

== Performances ==
Artist(s)	Song(s)	Introduced by
Nicki Minaj; Lil Wayne; David Guetta; Jason Derulo	"No Frauds" "Light My Body Up" "Swalla" "Regret in Your Tears"	Ludacris; Vanessa Hudgens
Camila Cabello	"I Have Questions" "Crying in the Club"	G-Eazy; Ashley Tisdale
The Chainsmokers	"Young"	Rita Ora
Julia Michaels	"Issues"	Bebe Rexha; DJ Khaled
Ed Sheeran	"Castle on the Hill"^{[a]}	Mark Cuban; Sara Foster
Miley Cyrus	"Malibu"	Billy Ray Cyrus; Noah Cyrus
Lorde	"Green Light"	Hailee Steinfeld
Sam Hunt	"Body Like a Back Road"	Vanessa Hudgens
Celine Dion	"My Heart Will Go On"	Lea Michele
Imagine Dragons	"Believer"	Ludacris; Vanessa Hudgens
Drake	"Gyalchester"^{[b]}	Ludacris; Vanessa Hudgens
Halsey	"Now or Never"	Ludacris; Vanessa Hudgens
Florida Georgia Line; John Legend	"Surefire" "H.O.L.Y."	Olivia Munn
Cher	"Believe" "If I Could Turn Back Time"	Gwen Stefani
Bruno Mars	"Versace on the Floor"^{[c]}	Ludacris; Vanessa Hudgens

Notes

- ^{^[a]} Sheeran's performance was pre-recorded at Movistar Arena in Santiago, Chile, on May 15 during his live show on the Divide Tour.
- ^{^[b]} Drake's performance was pre-recorded at The Fountains of Bellagio
- ^{^[c]} Mars' performance was pre-recorded on May 9 or 10 at Ziggo Dome in Amsterdam, Netherlands, during his live show on the 24K Magic World Tour

== Presenters ==
- Ludacris and Vanessa Hudgens introduced Nicki Minaj
- Ed Helms and Kevin Hart presented Top Collaboration
- G-Eazy and Ashley Tisdale introduced Camila Cabello
- Kate Beckinsale presented Top Male Artist
- Rita Ora introduced The Chainsmokers
- Bebe Rexha and DJ Khaled introduced Julia Michaels
- Mark Cuban and Sara Foster introduced Ed Sheeran
- Rachel Lindsay and Savvy Shields presented Top Country Song
- Billy Ray Cyrus and Noah Cyrus introduced Miley Cyrus
- Josh Duhamel presented Top Billboard 200 Album
- Hailee Steinfeld introduced Lorde
- Alexandra Daddario and Ansel Elgort presented Top Hot 100 Song
- Sean "Diddy" Combs and CJ Wallace honors B.I.G. Part 1
- Lindsey Stirling and Logan Paul presented Top Social Artist
- Lea Michele introduced Celine Dion
- Nicole Scherzinger and Jussie Smollett presented Top Country Artist
- Rachel Platten and Chris Daughtry presented Billboard Chart Achievement Award
- Olivia Munn introduced Florida Georgia Line and John Legend
- Dan Reynolds honors a tribute to Chris Cornell
- Gwen Stefani presented the Icon Award to Cher
- Ludacris and Vanessa Hudgens introduced Bruno Mars
- Prince Michael Jackson presented Top Artist

== Winners and nominees ==
Winners are listed first and in bold.

Top Artist	Top New Artist
**Drake**; Adele; Beyoncé; Justin Bieber; The Chainsmokers; Ariana Grande; Shawn Mendes; Rihanna; Twenty One Pilots; The Weeknd	**Zayn**; Alessia Cara; Desiigner; Lil Uzi Vert; Lukas Graham
Top Female Artist	Top Male Artist
**Beyoncé**; Adele; Ariana Grande; Rihanna; Sia	**Drake**; Justin Bieber; Future; Shawn Mendes; The Weeknd
Top Duo/Group	Billboard Chart Achievement (fan-voted)
**Twenty One Pilots**; The Chainsmokers; Coldplay; Florida Georgia Line; Guns N' Roses	**Twenty One Pilots**; Luke Bryan; Nicki Minaj; The Chainsmokers; The Weeknd
Top Billboard 200 Artist	Top Billboard 200 Album
**Drake**; Beyoncé; Prince; Twenty One Pilots; The Weeknd	**Views – Drake**; Anti – Rihanna; Blurryface – Twenty One Pilots; Lemonade – Beyoncé; Starboy – The Weeknd
Top Hot 100 Artist	Top Hot 100 Song
**Drake**; The Chainsmokers; Rihanna; Twenty One Pilots; The Weeknd	**"Closer" – The Chainsmokers featuring Halsey**; "Can't Stop the Feeling!" – Justin Timberlake; "Don't Let Me Down" – The Chainsmokers featuring Daya; "Heathens" – Twenty One Pilots; "One Dance" – Drake featuring Wizkid and Kyla
Top Song Sales Artist	Top Selling Song
**Drake**; The Chainsmokers; Prince; Justin Timberlake; Twenty One Pilots	**"Can't Stop the Feeling!" – Justin Timberlake**; "Closer" – The Chainsmokers featuring Halsey; "Don't Let Me Down" – The Chainsmokers featuring Daya; "Heathens" – Twenty One Pilots; "One Dance" – Drake featuring Wizkid and Kyla
Top Radio Songs Artist	Top Radio Song
**Twenty One Pilots**; Justin Bieber; The Chainsmokers; Drake; Rihanna	**"Can't Stop the Feeling!" – Justin Timberlake**; "Cheap Thrills" – Sia featuring Sean Paul; "Closer" – The Chainsmokers featuring Halsey; "Don't Let Me Down" – The Chainsmokers featuring Daya; "One Dance" – Drake featuring Wizkid and Kyla
Top Collaboration	Top Streaming Artist
**The Chainsmokers featuring Halsey - "Closer"**; The Chainsmokers featuring Daya - "Don't Let Me Down"; Drake featuring WizKid & Kyla - "One Dance"; Sia featuring Sean Paul - "Cheap Thrills"; The Weeknd featuring Daft Punk - "Starboy"	**Drake**; The Chainsmokers; Desiigner; Rihanna; Twenty One Pilots
Top Streaming Song (Audio)	Top Streaming Song (Video)
**"One Dance" – Drake featuring Wizkid and Kyla**; "Broccoli" – DRAM featuring Lil Yachty; "Closer" – The Chainsmokers featuring Halsey; "Needed Me" – Rihanna; "Starboy" – The Weeknd featuring Daft Punk	**"Panda" – Desiigner**; "Closer" – The Chainsmokers featuring Halsey; "Juju on That Beat (TZ Anthem)" – Zay Hilfigerrr & Zayion McCall; "Black Beatles" – Rae Sremmurd featuring Gucci Mane; "Heathens" – Twenty One Pilots
Top Touring Artist	Top Social Artist (fan-voted)
**Beyoncé**; Justin Bieber; Coldplay; Guns N' Roses; Bruce Springsteen & the E-Street Band	**BTS**; Justin Bieber; Ariana Grande; Shawn Mendes; Selena Gomez
Top Christian Artist	Top Christian Song
**Lauren Daigle**; Hillsong Worship; Hillary Scott & the Family; Skillet; Chris Tomlin	**"Thy Will" – Hillary Scott & the Family**; "Trust In You" – Lauren Daigle; "Feel Invincible" – Skillet; "Eye of the Storm" – Ryan Stevenson featuring GabeReal; "Chain Breaker" – Zach Williams
Top Christian Album	Top Gospel Artist
**How Can It Be – Lauren Daigle**; Hymns That Are Important to Us – Joey + Rory; Love Remains – Hillary Scott & the Family; The Very Next Thing – Casting Crowns; Unleashed – Skillet	**Kirk Franklin**; Jekalyn Carr; Travis Greene; Tamela Mann; Hezekiah Walker
Top Gospel Song	Top Gospel Album
**"Made a Way" – Travis Greene**; "You're Bigger" – Jekalyn Carr; "Put a Praise On It" – Tasha Cobbs featuring Kierra Sheard; "Wanna Be Happy?" – Kirk Franklin; "Better" – Hezekiah Walker	**One Way – Tamela Mann**; Better: Azusa – The Next Generation 2 – Hezekiah Walker; Losing My Religion – Kirk Franklin; The Hill – Travis Greene; One Place Live – Tasha Cobbs
Top Country Artist	Top Country Song
**Blake Shelton**; Florida Georgia Line; Keith Urban; Chris Stapleton; Jason Aldean	**Florida Georgia Line, "H.O.L.Y."**; Kenny Chesney featuring Pink, "Setting the World on Fire"; Florida Georgia Line featuring Tim McGraw, "May We All"; Little Big Town, "Better Man"; Keith Urban, "Blue Ain't Your Color"
Top Country Album	Top Country Collaboration
**Traveller – Chris Stapleton**; Dig Your Roots – Florida Georgia Line; If I'm Honest – Blake Shelton; Ripcord – Keith Urban; They Don't Know – Jason Aldean	**Kenny Chesney featuring Pink - "Setting the World on Fire"**; Dierks Bentley featuring Elle King - "Different for Girls"; Eric Church featuring Rhiannon Giddens - "Kill a Word"; Florida Georgia Line featuring Tim McGraw - "May We All"; Chris Young featuring Vince Gill - "Sober Saturday Night"
Top Country Tour	Top Dance/Electronic Artist
**Kenny Chesney**; Luke Bryan; Dixie Chicks	**The Chainsmokers**; Calvin Harris; Major Lazer; DJ Snake; Lindsey Stirling
Top Dance/Electronic Song	Top Dance/Electronic Album
**"Closer" – The Chainsmokers featuring Halsey**; "Don't Let Me Down" – The Chainsmokers featuring Daya; "This Is What You Came For" – Calvin Harris featuring Rihanna; "Cold Water" – Major Lazer featuring Justin Bieber & MØ; "Let Me Love You" – DJ Snake featuring Justin Bieber	**Brave Enough – Lindsey Stirling**; Bouquet – The Chainsmokers; Collage – The Chainsmokers; Skin – Flume; Cloud Nine – Kygo
Top Latin Artist	Top Latin Song
**Juan Gabriel**; J Balvin; Los Plebes del Rancho de Ariel Camacho; Maluma; Nicky Jam	**Nicky Jam, "Hasta el Amanecer"**; Daddy Yankee, "Shaky Shaky"; Enrique Iglesias featuring Wisin, "Duele el Corazón"; Shakira featuring Maluma, "Chantaje"; Carlos Vives & Shakira, “La Bicicleta”
Top Latin Album	Top R&B Artist
**Los Dúo, Vol. 2 – Juan Gabriel**; Energia – J Balvin; Primera Cita – CNCO; Vestido de Etiqueta por Eduardo Magallanes – Juan Gabriel; Recuerden Mi Estilo – Los Plebes del Rancho de Ariel Camacho	**Beyoncé**; Bruno Mars; Frank Ocean; Rihanna; The Weeknd
Top R&B Song	Top R&B Album
**Drake featuring WizKid & Kyla, "One Dance"**; Bruno Mars, "24K Magic"; Rihanna, "Needed Me"; Rihanna featuring Drake, "Work"; The Weeknd featuring Daft Punk, "Starboy"	**Lemonade – Beyoncé**; Anti – Rihanna; Blonde – Frank Ocean; Starboy – The Weeknd; 24K Magic – Bruno Mars
Top R&B Collaboration	Top R&B Tour
**Drake featuring WizKid & Kyla – "One Dance"**; PARTYNEXTDOOR featuring Drake - "Come and See Me"; Rihanna featuring Drake - "Work"; The Weeknd featuring Daft Punk - "I Feel It Coming"; The Weeknd featuring Daft Punk - "Starboy"	**Beyoncé**; Lionel Richie; Rihanna
Top Rap Artist	Top Rap Song
**Drake**; J. Cole; Desiigner; Future; Rae Sremmurd	**Desiigner, "Panda"**; Drake, “Fake Love”; DRAM featuring Lil Yachty, "Broccoli"; Migos featuring Lil Uzi Vert, “Bad and Boujee”; Rae Sremmurd featuring Gucci Mane, "Black Beatles"
Top Rap Album	Top Rap Collaboration
**Views – Drake**; 4 Your Eyez Only – J. Cole; Islah – Kevin Gates; Major Key – DJ Khaled; We Got It from Here... Thank You 4 Your Service – A Tribe Called Quest	**Rae Sremmurd featuring Gucci Mane - "Black Beatles"**; DRAM featuring Lil Yachty - "Broccoli"; Zay Hilfigerrr & Zayion McCall - "Juju on That Beat (TZ Anthem)"; Machine Gun Kelly & Camila Cabello - "Bad Things"; Migos featuring Lil Uzi Vert - "Bad and Boujee"
Top Rap Tour	Top Rock Artist
**Drake**; Future; Kanye West	**Twenty One Pilots**; Coldplay; The Lumineers; Metallica; X Ambassadors
Top Rock Song	Top Rock Album
**Twenty One Pilots, "Heathens"**; Lil Wayne, Wiz Khalifa & Imagine Dragons with Logic & Ty Dolla $ign featuring X Ambassadors, "Sucker for Pain"; Twenty One Pilots, "Ride"; Twenty One Pilots, "Stressed Out"; X Ambassadors, "Unsteady"	**Hardwired... to Self-Destruct – Metallica**; A Moon Shaped Pool – Radiohead; Blurryface – Twenty One Pilots; Cleopatra – The Lumineers; The Getaway – Red Hot Chili Peppers
Top Rock Tour	Top Soundtrack/Cast Album
**Coldplay**; Guns N' Roses; Bruce Springsteen & the E-Street Band	**Hamilton: An American Musical**; Moana; Purple Rain; Suicide Squad: The Album; Trolls
Icon Award
Cher

=== Artists with multiple wins and nominations ===
Artists that received multiple nominations
Nominations	Artist
22	Drake
22	The Chainsmokers
17	Twenty One Pilots
14	Rihanna
13	The Weeknd
8	Beyoncé
7	Justin Bieber
7	Halsey
7	Kyla
7	WizKid
6	Florida Georgia Line
5	Daft Punk
5	Daya
5	Desiigner
4	Coldplay
4	Rae Sremmurd
4	Justin Timberlake
3	Kenny Chesney
3	Lauren Daigle
3	D.R.A.M.
3	Kirk Franklin
3	Future
3	Juan Gabriel
3	Ariana Grande
3	Travis Greene
3	Gucci Mane
3	Guns N' Roses
3	Lil Uzi Vert
3	Lil Yachty
3	Bruno Mars
3	Shawn Mendes
3	Hillary Scott & the Family
3	Sia
3	Keith Urban
3	Hezekiah Walker
3	X Ambassadors
2	Adele
2	Jason Aldean
2	Luke Bryan
2	Jekalyn Carr
2	Tasha Cobbs
2	J.Cole
2	Calvin Harris
2	Zay Hilfigerrr
2	J Balvin
2	Los Plebes del Rancho de Ariel Camacho
2	The Lumineers
2	Major Lazer
2	Maluma
2	Tamela Mann
2	Zayion McCall
2	Tim McGraw
2	Metallica
2	Migos
2	Nicky Jam
2	Frank Ocean
2	Sean Paul
2	Pink
2	Prince
2	Shakira
2	Blake Shelton
2	Skillet
2	DJ Snake
2	Bruce Springsteen & the E-Street Band
2	Chris Stapleton
2	Lindsey Stirling

Artists that received multiple awards
Wins	Artist
13	Drake
5	Beyoncé
5	Twenty One Pilots
4	The Chainsmokers
3	Halsey
3	Kyla
3	WizKid
2	Kenny Chesney
2	Lauren Daigle
2	Desiigner
2	Juan Gabriel
2	Justin Timberlake
