= Evening:Morning =

Album by The Digital Age

Studio album by The Digital Age
- Released: August 13, 2013
- Studio: Asterisk Sound Studio
- Genres: Contemporary worship music, Christian rock
- Length: 51:29
- Label: Fair Trade
- Producers: The Digital Age; Seth Mosley

The Digital Age chronology
| Rehearsals EP (2012) | Evening:Morning (2013) | Rehearsals Vol. 2 EP (2014) |

Evening:Morning is the first studio album by contemporary worship music band The Digital Age, which was released on August 13, 2013 by the Fair Trade Services record label, and it was produced by every member of the band along with Seth Mosley. The album has achieved charting commercial successes and critical acclamation.

== Background ==
On August 13, 2013, the album was released by Fair Trade Services. The Digital Age produced this album with Seth Mosley.

== Music and lyrics ==
At HM, Sarah Brehm wrote that the album was "proof that worship music doesn't have to be generically simple; it can be fascinatingly enthralling and emotional." Jesus Freak Hideout's Mark Rice stated that musically the release "may not be on par with the crowning achievements of the DC*B, but I love how they are attempting to carve out their own niche in the industry separate from their former band's namesake rather than continue in the same musical vein." At New Release Tuesday, Marcus Hathcock told that the band "leveraged the simplicity of Dodson's voice and paired it with Waldrop's higher tones to create an ethereal, haunting, choral sound throughout the album." Matthew Reamus at All About Worship said that the band "continues the electronic rock feel of the David Crowder*Band while experimenting with new concepts." However, Cross Rhythms' Elliot Rose noted that "Although the atmospheric arrangements are pleasant on the ears, few of the songs stand out, and it seems to take a long time to get through the 12 tracks."

Jeremy Armstrong of Worship Leader said that "With an eclectic musical approach one part Americana-rock with the driving kick, one part ambient-electronica with its washes of digital ash, and one part guitar-driven punk-pop rock,, The Digital Age keeps the standard they waved for over a decade when the quartet made up all but two members of David Crowder*Band" At Indie Vision Music, Jonathan Andre wrote that "With such an atmosphere that brings together lovers of music from all sides of the musical genre spectrum, there is something for everyone, from songs with reflective worship, to others melodies that include sections of screamo and others that offer up great and powerful ballads." Calvin Moore of The Christian Manifesto wrote that the album has a "stubborn refusal to settle into any sort of musical groove", and noted how they are a "vocally challenged band that is going to have to struggle hard against sounding like every other band that’s been trying to copy them for so many years."

Rice noted that lyrically, the album does not have "anything truly remarkable or profound, but it is simply solid and perfectly calculated as to never get trite, boring, or less than sincere in any way." Moore wrote that "The lyrical prowess and instrumental delivery is there, but can they set themselves apart from their peers and continue creating music without being accused of trying to hold on to what they used to be." Armstrong noted that "Thematically the record moves from brokenness to restoration, i.e. evening to morning." At Christian Music Review, Daniel Edgeman wrote that the album was "very modern, maybe even ahead of their time, but at the same time the lyrics will take you back to some of the hymns and choruses you sang as a child."

== Critical reception ==
Professional ratings
Review scores
| Source | Rating |
|---|---|
| All About Worship | 4/5 stars |
| AllMusic | 4/5 stars |
| CCM Magazine | 4/5 stars |
| The Christian Manifesto | 4/5 stars |
| CM Addict | 4.5/5 stars |
| Cross Rhythms | 7/10 squares |
| HM | 4/5 stars |
| Indie Vision Music | 4/5 stars |
| Jesus Freak Hideout | 4/5 stars |
| Louder Than the Music | 4/5 stars |
| New Release Tuesday | 4/5 stars |
| Worship Leader | 4.5/5 stars |

Evening:Morning garnered critical acclaim from the fourteen music critics to review the album. Andy Argyrakis of CCM Magazine noted how "the foursome takes a complex musical route toward an album of praise anthems sure to resonate with the digital generation and beyond." At HM, Sarah Brehm called the release "a superb debut" that will surely cause them "to go far." Elliot Rose at Cross Rhythms felt that "it's an uphill climb to live up to their previous reputation." At AllMusic, David Jeffries stated that "Round it out with songwriting that is solid and Crowder's old crew lift themselves above that tag, staking their own claim in the world of Christian rock with this knockout debut."

Mark Rice at Jesus Freak Hideout told that "Without a doubt, this is an album that improves with each listen." Also of Jesus Freak Hideout, Roger Gelwicks noted how the album "is a fine precedent to work from" that "is a mostly illustrious effort of this work." Marcus Hathcock of New Release Tuesday found that "there's plenty of brilliance here in previously untraveled musical territory." At Worship Leader, Jeremy Armstrong noted how "The Digital Age is going a long way in keeping their side of the arrangement; it contains tones of David Crowder*Band, but it stands starkly unique [...] and excellent." Jonathan Andre of Indie Vision Music felt that "Evening:Morning offers a refreshing and reinvigorating album for those who are seemingly tired of the over-commercialised CCM music industry."

At The Christian Manifesto, Calvin Moore told that the release "isn't a bad effort", and felt that the album "ends up being a more fanciful worship project than anticipated, but it works well and offers a fresh direction for the genre." Louder Than the Music's Dave Wood noted that "There's plenty of variation in the style of songs on this album, and music lovers will find more than enough to keep them entertained." At All About Worship, Matthew Reames evoked that the album "was masterful in how each song allowed the guitars to fit in without overpowering the song itself." Christian Music Review's Daniel Edgeman rated the release a 4.9-out-of-five, and called the album "a breath of fresh air." At CM Addict, David Bunce affirmed that "This is a great album!"

== Commercial performance ==
For the Billboard charting week of August 31, 2013, Evening:Morning was the No. 100 most sold album in the entirety of the United States by the Billboard 200 and it was the No. 3 Top Christian Album as well.

== Track listing ==
All tracks are written by The Digital Age (Jeremy Bush, Mike Dodson, Jack Parker, Mark Waldrop) unless noted below.

Track listing
| No. | Title | Writer(s) | Length |
|---|---|---|---|
| 1. | "Captured" | | 3:18 |
| 2. | "Symphony of Grace" | | 3:23 |
| 3. | "All the Poor & Powerless" | Leslie Jordan, David Leonard | 5:17 |
| 4. | "Your Name (We Shout)" | Dodson, Seth Mosley, Waldrop | 5:23 |
| 5. | "Overcome" | | 6:44 |
| 6. | "Through the Night" | | 3:34 |
| 7. | "Glow" | | 3:38 |
| 8. | "Break Every Chain" (Tasha Cobbs cover) | William Andrew Reagan | 2:42 |
| 9. | "Believe" | | 4:44 |
| 10. | "God of Us All" | | 3:50 |
| 11. | "Always You" | | 5:15 |
| 12. | "Morning Song" | | 3:41 |
| Total length: | | | 51:29 |

== Personnel ==
(Adapted from liner notes)

The Digital Age

- Jack Parker – vocals, keyboards, programming, guitars
- Mark Waldrop – vocals, keyboards, programming, guitars
- Mike Dodson – vocals, keyboards, programming, bass guitar
- Jeremy "B-Wack" Bush – drums, programming, robotics

Additional personnel

- Mike Hogan – violins (5)

=== Production ===
- The Digital Age – producers
- Seth Mosley – producer (8)
- Shane D. Wilson – mixing at St. Izzy's of the East (Nashville, Tennessee)
- Bob Boyd – mastering at Ambient Digital (Houston, Texas)
- Ryan Weaver – art direction, design
- Bliss Braoudakis – photography
- Showdown Management – management

== Chart performance ==
| Chart (2013) | Peak position |
|---|---|
| US Billboard 200 | 100 |
| US Top Christian Albums (Billboard) | 3 |
