= Break Every Chain =

Single by Tasha Cobbs

from the album Grace
- Written: 2009
- Released: November 27, 2012
- Recorded: June 14, 2012 • Montgomery, AL
- Venue: Northview Christian Church, Montgomery, AL
- Genre: Contemporary gospel
- Length: 8:18 (Album Version) 4:14 (Radio Edit)
- Label: EMI Gospel • Motown Gospel
- Songwriter: Will Reagan
- Producer: VaShawn Mitchell

Tasha Cobbs singles chronology
"Smile" (2012)	"Break Every Chain" (2012)	"For Your Glory" (2012)

"Break Every Chain" is a song performed by American recording artist Tasha Cobbs from her major-label debut studio album Grace (2013). The song was composed by Will Reagan, produced by VaShawn Mitchell and released as the album's lead single. The songs features guest vocals performed by Timiney Figueroa from Hezekiah Walker's Love Fellowship Crusade Choir.

The song was originally written and performed by Will Reagan and the United Pursuit Band in 2009. The song was later covered by Jesus Culture in 2011. However, Cobbs' interpretation of the song is the first commercially successful and accepted within the gospel community, of the trio.

The song topped the Billboard Gospel Songs chart in 2012, as well as the corresponding digital and airplay gospel charts. The song also managed to peak at number thirty-five on the Billboard Holiday Songs chart and twenty-nine on the Billboard Adult R&B Songs chart. At the 56th Grammy Awards, the song won a Grammy for "Best Gospel/Contemporary Christian Music Performance". Cobbs performed the song at the 44th GMA Dove Awards in October 2013. The Digital Age recorded a version of this song in 2013 off their debut album Evening:Morning.

== Background ==
Tasha Cobbs began her music career in Atlanta, Georgia, with her father, who also pastored. She oversaw the Music Ministry at Jesus New Life Ministries. In 2006, Cobbs toured the United States with Bishop William Murphy and The dReam Center church of Atlanta. Finally, Cobbs launched her solo career with her independently released album Smile in 2010. The song, along with Grace, was recorded live on June 14, 2012, at Northview Christian Church in Montgomery, Alabama, was produced by VaShawn Mitchell.

== Reception ==
Tasha Cobbs "Break Every Chain" (2012)
A 30-second sample of "Break Every" musically featuring electric instrumentation and R&B influences.

The song features an emotional female lead vocal performance by Tasha Cobbs, who uses a subtle use of vocal harmony, composed in major key tonality. Musically, the song features electric rock instrumentation and R&B influences with upbeat lyrics. Lyrically, "it's a powerful chanting declaration sure to empower believers across the world." The official lyric video for the song contains over 100,009,153 views million views on the video-sharing website YouTube.

At the 55th Grammy Awards, the song won a Grammy for "Best Gospel/Contemporary Christian Music Performance". At the 44th GMA Dove Awards, Cobbs received five nominations including New Artist of the Year, and Contemporary Gospel/Urban Album of the Year for Grace. "Break Every Chain" was nominated for Song of the Year, Gospel Performance of the Year and Contemporary Gospel/Urban Song of the Year. At the 29th Annual Stellar Awards, Cobbs was nominated for Artist of the Year, New Artist of the Year, Female Artist of the Year, and Contemporary Female Vocalist of the Year. Grace was nominated for CD of the Year, Contemporary CD of the Year and Praise and Worship CD of the Year. "Break Every Chain" was nominated for "Song of the Year", as well.

== Chart performance ==
The song became Cobb's first number one single, displacing Tamela Mann's "Take Me to the King", which had spent 19 non-consecutive weeks atop the Billboard Gospel Songs chart. "Break Every Chain" led the chart for 7 consecutive weeks.

The song also topped the corresponding gospel charts: the Billboard Gospel Airplay chart, Billboard Gospel Digital Songs chart, and the Billboard Gospel Streaming Songs chart.

== Charts ==
=== Weekly charts ===
Chart (2013)	Peak position
US Bubbling Under R&B/Hip-Hop Singles (Billboard)	4
US Adult R&B Songs (Billboard)	29
US Holiday Airplay (Billboard)	35
US Hot Gospel Songs (Billboard)	1

=== Year-end charts ===
Chart (2013)	Peak position
US Hot Gospel Songs (Billboard)	4

Chart (2014)	Peak position
US Hot Gospel Songs (Billboard)	6

== Certifications ==
Region	Certification	Certified units/sales
United States (RIAA)	Platinum	1,000,000^{‡}
^{‡} Sales+streaming figures based on certification alone.
