= The Digital Age =

American rock band

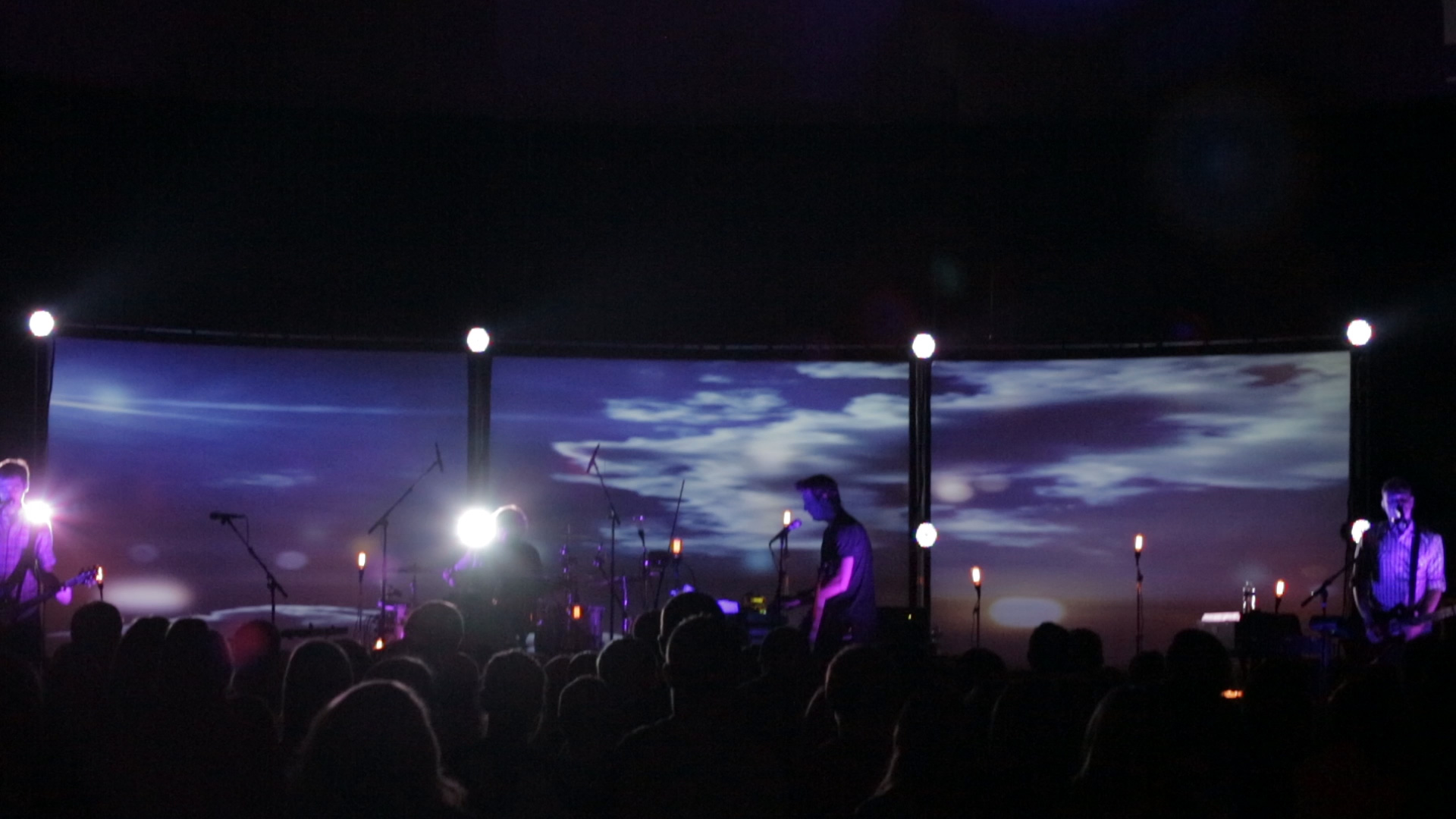
- Performing on October 26, 2013 during the Evening:Morning Tour

Background information
- Origin: Waco, Texas, U.S.
- Genres: Christian rock, electronic rock, worship
- Years active: 2012–2020
- Labels: Independent, Fair Trade Services
- Spinoff of: David Crowder Band
- Past members: Jack Parker; Jeremy "B-Wack" Bush; Mike "Mike D" Dodson; Mark Waldrop
- Website: The Digital Age on Facebook

The Digital Age was a band from Waco, Texas consisting of four of the six members of the former David Crowder Band. They formed in 2012 after David Crowder Band's final tour. They disbanded in 2020.

== History ==
The Digital Age were a modern-rock Christian band composed of four of the six musicians from the Grammy-nominated, multiple Dove Award-winning David Crowder Band. The Digital Age formed in January 2012, following the final performance of the David Crowder * Band at the Passion 2012 conference in Atlanta, Georgia They formed The Digital Age to continue their love of music and to continue their outreach to the youth of the world. In early 2012, the members of The Digital Age constructed a studio in their hometown of Waco, Texas called "Asterisk Sound". On October 9, 2015 The Digital Age released their first Brazilian album in Portuguese. On June 5, 2012, the band released an EP called Rehearsals. The EP consists of six songs which the band also released as YouTube videos, recorded at Asterisk Sound, the first of which were published in April 2012. The EP quickly shot to No. 1 on the iTunes Christian Albums chart, and charted multiple times in Billboard Magazine, reaching No. 12 on the Heatseekers chart, No. 21 on the Top Christian and Gospel Albums chart, and No. 12 on the Top Christian Albums chart.

The band's first full-length album, Evening:Morning, was released on August 13, 2013, a follow-up EP, Rehearsals, Vol 2 was recorded live in their studio, Asterisk Sound, and released in 2014. Their second album, Galaxies, was released October 28, 2016.

They have also released two Christmas singles, Midnight Clear in 2012 and Silent Night in 2015.

== Former Members ==
- Jeremy "B-Wack" Bush - drums, percussion, bells, programming, synthesizers
- Mike "Mike D" Dodson – vocals, bass guitar, piano, programming, keyboards, synthesizers
- Jack "Jack Attack" Parker – vocals, electric guitar, acoustic guitar, programming, rhodes, banjo, synth
- Mark "The Shark" Waldrop – vocals, electric guitar, acoustic guitar, programming, mandolin, synth, percussion

The members of the band were involved with University Baptist Church of Waco, Texas in varying ways since its inception in 1995;

== Discography ==
=== Albums ===
Title	Details	Peak chart positions	
Title	Details	Billboard 200	US Christ
Evening:Morning	Release date: August 13, 2013; Label: Fair Trade Services/Columbia; Formats: CD, digital download, Vinyl	100	3
Glow (Brazil exclusive)	Release date: October 9, 2015; Formats: digital download	—	—
Galaxies	Release date: October 28, 2016; Label: Fair Trade Services/Columbia; Formats: CD, digital download, Vinyl	—	—

=== Singles ===
- "Captured" (2013)
- "Break Every Chain" (2014)

=== EPs ===
Title	Details	Peak chart positions	
Title	Details	US Christ	US Heat
Rehearsals	Release date: June 5, 2012; Label: Independent; Formats: CD, digital download	12	12
Rehearsals Vol. 2	Release date: November 4, 2014; Label: Fair Trade Services; Formats: CD, digital download, Vinyl	—	—
