= Grace (Tasha Cobbs album) =

Studio album by Tasha Cobbs
- Released: February 5, 2013
- Recorded: June 12, 2012
- Venue: Montgomery, Alabama
- Genre: Gospel; CCM; traditional black gospel; urban gospel worship; Southern gospel; gospel country
- Length: 60:47
- Label: EMI Gospel

Tasha Cobbs chronology
Grace (2013)	One Place Live (2015)

Singles from Grace
- 1. "Break Every Chain" Released: November 12, 2012; 2. "For Your Glory" Released: 2013

Grace is the major-label debut album by American gospel singer Tasha Cobbs, released February 5, 2013 on EMI Gospel. Cobbs won the Grammy Award for Best Gospel/Contemporary Christian Music Performance for the single, "Break Every Chain", at the 56th Grammy Awards. The album reached No. 1 on the Billboard Gospel Albums chart and No. 61 on the Billboard 200. As of 2016, nearly 200,000 copies have been sold in the United States.

== Critical reception ==
Professional ratings
Review scores
Source	Rating
AllMusic	4/5 stars

David Jeffries from AllMusic stated "Tasha Cobbs aims to re-create the live worship experience on her major-label debut".

== Track listing ==
No.	Title	Length
1.	"Get Up"	5:15
2.	"Love You Forever"	6:06
3.	"Happy"	5:18
4.	"For Your Glory"	6:46
5.	"Grace"	6:09
6.	"Smile"	5:47
7.	"Break Every Chain" (featuring Timiney Figueroa (Live Version))	8:18
8.	"Confidence"	6:14
9.	"Greater"	5:21
10.	"Ahh"	5:33
Total length:		60:47

== Charts ==
=== Weekly charts ===
Chart (2013)	Peak position
US Billboard 200	61
US Top Gospel Albums (Billboard)	1

=== Decade-end charts ===
Chart (2010–2021)	Peak position
US Top Gospel Albums (Billboard)	2

== Certifications ==
Region	Certification	Certified units/sales
United States (RIAA)	Gold	500,000^{‡}
^{‡} Sales+streaming figures based on certification alone.
