= Maranda Curtis =

Minister Maranda Curtis
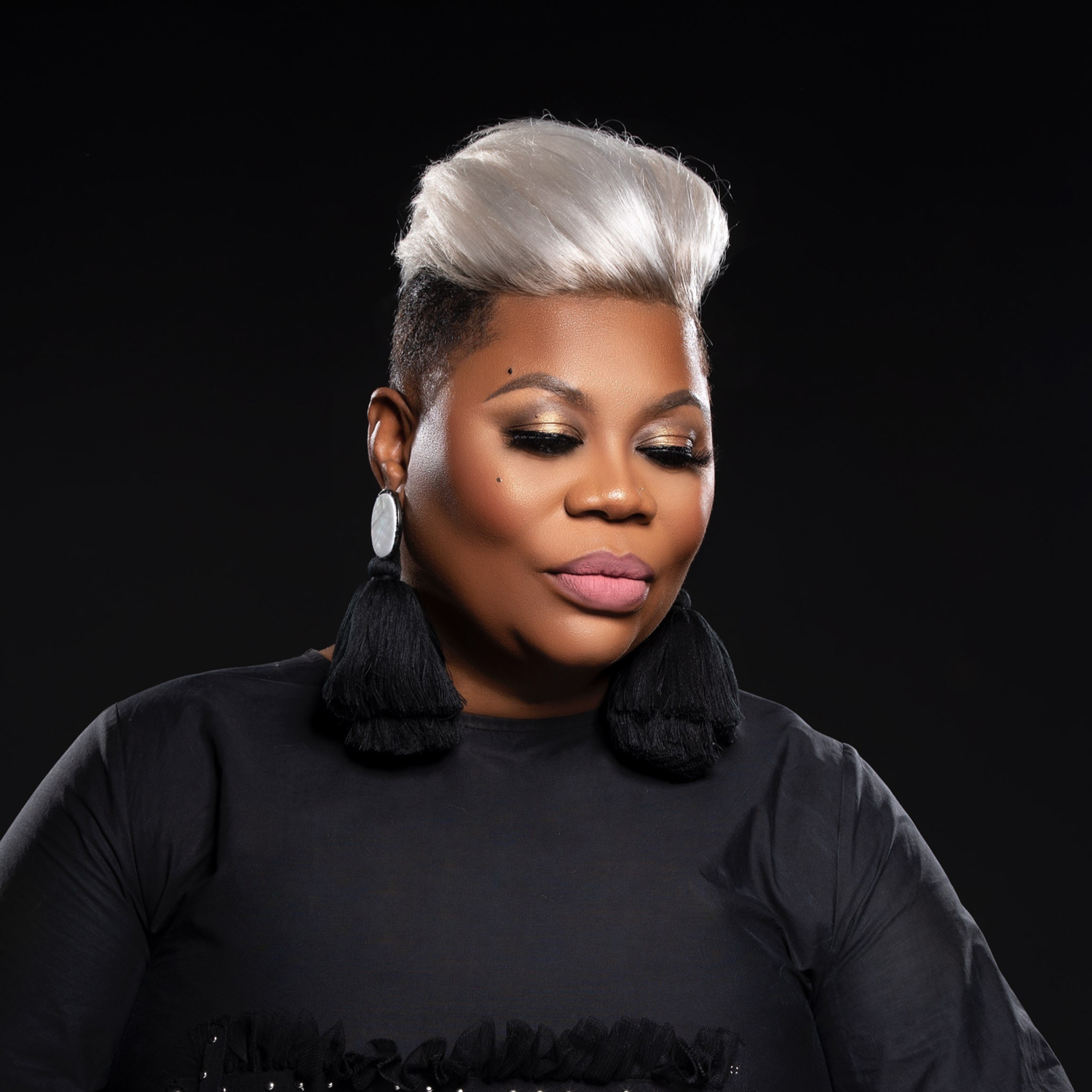

Background information
- Also known as: Maranda Curtis Willis
- Born: August 4, 1979 (age 46); Miami, Florida, U.S.
- Genres: Gospel; praise and worship
- Years active: 2012–present
- Labels: Butterfly Works Red Alliance Media Fair Trade Services
- Website: iammaranda.com

Maranda Curtis (born August 4, 1979) is an American gospel singer and praise and worship leader formerly with The Potter's House Church, Dallas. Her music has garnered her several nominations from the Stellar Awards and the Dove Awards. She was awarded in the 2020 BMI Trailblazers of Gospel Awards with "Nobody Like You Lord" being one the top 20 most performed Gospel songs in the United States.

== Early life ==
Maranda Curtis was born on August 4, 1979, in Miami as the fourth of seven children of pastor W. S. Curtis and Darlene Curtis, both former R&B singers. Before she began working professionally making gospel and praise and worship music, she grew up listening to R&B and jazz. She began singing at an early age, learning to harmonize from sitting in on her parents' rehearsals.

== Career ==
Curtis is a former worship leader at The Potter's House in Dallas, which is "one of the most influential churches" in the United States. In 2012, she released her first single, "Don't Take Your Love Away".

Curtis's first extended play (EP), The Maranda Experience, Vol. 1, debuted atop the Billboard Top Gospel Albums chart dated August 26, 2017. Curtis has explained that the title came from a desire of "making my private worship public" by "sharing my experience—the 'Maranda experience'—with others". She learned this desire of "responsible worship", she said, from a visit to South Africa where she taught congregants who "would worship for three and a half hours. I was so convicted. I repented. A burning desire intensified inside of me to never be guilty of withholding my worship." The singer Fantasia commended The Maranda Experience, calling it "true worship".

A live-in-concert version of the EP, Open Heaven: The Maranda Experience Live, was released the following year, as was the associated single "Nobody Like You Lord". Recorded in Delaware, the live album contains "jazz, traditional and churchy ballads ... all the sounds I grew up singing", as Curtis said. Open Heaven debuted as a Billboard number-one gospel album on May 12, 2018, and stayed on the chart for 35 weeks; "Nobody Like You Lord" debuted on the Hot Gospel Songs chart at No. 20, eventually reaching the fifth place. Later in 2018, Curtis released a Christmas music EP, Maranda Presents a Holy Christmas, which BroadwayWorld called "extraordinary in its musical arrangements" with "the expected goosebump-raising vocals delivered by Curtis". It reached No. 9 on the Top Gospel Albums chart.

At the 34th Annual Stellar Awards, for gospel music of 2018–19, Curtis was nominated for seven Stellars—including Artist of the Year, Song of the Year ("Nobody Like You Lord"), and CD of the Year (Open Heaven)—but she won none.

Curtis' newest project, Die To Live (2022), is a half live, half studio album inspired by and written for the grieving process Curtis experienced after the passing of her mother, Darlene.

She is an honorary member of Sigma Gamma Rho sorority.

== Discography ==
=== EPs ===
List of extended plays, with selected chart positions
Title	Album details	Peak chart positions	
Title	Album details	US Gospel	US Christ
The Maranda Experience, Vol. 1	Released: August 4, 2017; Label: Butterfly Works / C Bazz ENT	1	5
Maranda Presents A Holy Christmas	Released: November 16, 2018; Label: Butterfly Works / Red Alliance Media / Fair Trade Services	9	
The Maranda Curtis Experience, Vol. 2	Released: July 27, 2020; Label: Butterfly Works / Red Alliance Media / Fair Trade Services	19	

=== Live albums ===
List of extended plays, with selected chart positions
Title	Album details	Peak chart positions
Title	Album details	US Gospel
Open Heaven: The Maranda Experience	Released: April 27, 2018; Label: Butterfly Works / Red Alliance Media / Fair Trade Services	1
Die To Live	Released: February 18, 2022; Label: Butterfly Works / Red Alliance Media / Fair Trade Services	12

=== Singles ===
- "Don't Take Your Love Away"
- "Power Lord"
- "Release" (The Church Choir featuring Maranda Curtis & John P. Kee; 2017)
- "In Your Presence" (David Walker featuring Maranda Curtis; 2017)
- "Open Heaven" (2018)
- "Nobody Like You Lord" (2018)
- "Joy" (2018)
- "I'm All In" (2019)
- "Press" (2020)
- "Lazarus" (2021)
