= Make Room (album) =

Studio album by Jonathan McReynolds
- Released: March 9, 2018
- Recorded: 2017
- Genre: Gospel
- Length: 64:40
- Labels: Light Records, Entertainment One Music
- Producers: Jonathan McReynolds (also exec.); Gina Miller (exec.); Walter Thomas (exec.); Kelvin Lenox; Anna Bartlett Warner; Terrell Demetrius Wilson; Darryl "Lil Man" Howell

Jonathan McReynolds chronology
Life Music: Stage Two (2015)	Make Room (2018)

Singles from Make Room
- 1. "Not Lucky, I'm Loved" Released: October 13, 2017; 2. "Cycles" Released: June 8, 2018; 3. "Make Room" Released: February 1, 2019

Make Room is the third studio album by American singer-songwriter Jonathan McReynolds, released on March 9, 2018. The album earned McReynolds a Grammy Award nomination for Best Gospel Album.

== Recording and production ==
Production of the album began in summer of 2017 for Make Room. McReynolds also took the role of executive producing alongside Gina Miller and Walter Thomas. He collaborated with several record producers and songwriters, including Kelvin Lenox, Anna Bartlett Warner, and Terrell Demetrius Wilson. The album also saw the return of frequent collaborator Darryl "Lil Man" Howell, who was also a music producer for McReynolds' previous album Life Music: Stage Two. McReynolds also co-wrote or co-produced all material on Make Room.

== Release and promotion ==
The album was released worldwide on March 9, 2018. A deluxe edition of the album, titled Make More Room, was also released simultaneously with the standard edition, which includes all of the previously released songs in addition to the new songs "Excited", "Try", and "God Is Good". To further promote the album, McReynolds embarked his Make More Room Tour.

== Singles ==
The album's lead single, "Not Lucky, I'm Loved", was released on October 13, 2017. The song debuted at number 22 on the Billboard Hot Gospel Songs chart in week of December 23, 2017, but fell off the charts in the same week. In February 2018, "Not Lucky, I'm Loved" re-entered the charts at number 25. The single peaked at number four on the chart for the week ending June 16, 2018, make it his highest-charting song on the chart. After a total of thirty-one weeks on the chart, "Not Lucky, I'm Loved" fell to the fifth position before retiring from the chart for the final time in late September 2018. The single also peaked at number one on the Gospel Airplay chart and Gospel Digital Song Sales chart. On January 12, 2018, McReynolds released a music video for "Not Lucky, I'm Loved". The music video has been received over four million views. The song also appeared on the 2019 compilation album “WOW Gospel 2019”

"Cycles", featuring DOE, debuted at number 21 on the Hot Gospel Songs chart in the week of February 17, 2018, the same week that "Not Lucky, I'm Loved" had re-entered the chart. The song ultimately peaked at number sixteen on the chart. "Make Room" was released on February 1, 2019. On March 30, 2019, "Make Room" debuted at number 21 on the Hot Gospel Songs chart.

== Accolades ==
Make Room earned McReynolds two Grammy nominations at the 61st Annual Grammy Awards in 2019. The album received a nomination for Best Gospel Album and the single "Cycles" received a nomination for Best Gospel Performance/Song, ultimately losing in both categories to Tori Kelly.

Make Room earned a total of nine Stellar Award nominations at the 34th Annual Stellar Awards in 2019, eight of which McReynolds received nominations for. McReynolds won all eight of his nominations including "Artist of the Year" and "Contemporary Male Vocalist of the Year". McReynolds also won "Producer of the Year", an award shared with the production team of Make Room. "Not Lucky, I'm Loved" won in the categories for "Song of the Year" and "Urban/Inspirational Single or Performance of the Year". The album Make Room won "CD of the Year" and "Contemporary CD of the Year". Keemon Leonard, art director for Make Room, received a nomination for "Recorded Music Packaging of the Year" but lost to Israel Houghton.

== Commercial performance ==
In the United States, the album debuted at number 97 on the Billboard 200 for the week ending March 24, 2018, remaining on the chart for one week. It debuted 7,000 album-equivalent units, out of which 6,000 copies were pure album sales. Make Room also debuted at number one on the Top Gospel Albums chart, spending its first and only week at number one. The following week, the album fell to number two and continued to gradually move back several positions within the fifty-five weeks it spent on the chart. The album peaked at number twelve on the Digital Albums chart.

== Track listing ==
Make Room – Standard edition
No.	Title	Producer(s)	Length
1.	"Life Room Anthem" (featuring Dee-1)	McReynolds	3:12
2.	"Great is the Lord" (featuring Corey Barksdale and Tonya Baker)	McReynolds; Kelvin Lenox	9:00
3.	"Cycles" (featuring DOE)	McReynolds	6:16
4.	"L.R.F. (Rollercoasters)"	McReynolds	3:12
5.	"Comparison Kills"	McReynolds	3:35
6.	"Graduate"	McReynolds; Terrell Demetrius Wilson	3:25
7.	"Better"	McReynolds	3:37
8.	"L.R.F. (Keep On Doin' Better)"	McReynolds	6:17
9.	"Not Lucky, I'm Loved"	McReynolds; Wilson; Anna Bartlett Warner	6:48
10.	"Make Room"	McReynolds	5:40
11.	"L.R.F. (Move That Over)"	McReynolds	4:28
12.	"Lover of My Soul"	McReynolds	3:21
13.	"Smile (Life Room)"	McReynolds	5:41
Total length:			64:40
