= Jonathan McReynolds =

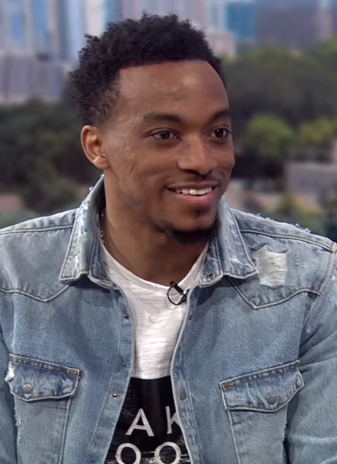
- McReynolds in 2018

Background information
- Born: Jonathan Caleb McReynolds; September 17, 1989 (age 37); Chicago, Illinois
- Genres: Gospel; urban contemporary gospel
- Occupations: Singer; songwriter
- Instruments: Vocals; guitar; piano; organ; drums
- Years active: 2012–present
- Labels: Light; Entertainment One
- Website: jonathanmcreynolds.com

Jonathan Caleb McReynolds (born September 17, 1989) is a Grammy-winning American gospel musician. He began his music career in 2012 with the release of Life Music via Entertainment One Music. He has had two No. 1 Billboard Gospel Albums since with Life Music: Stage Two (2015) and Make Room (2018), fifteen Stellar Awards, four GMA Dove Awards and five Grammy Award nominations in addition to his win in 2021.

== Early life ==
McReynolds was born in Chicago, Illinois, on September 17, 1989, as Jonathan Caleb McReynolds. He was raised by a single mother with love and support from his family, church members and his pastor at New Original Church of God in Christ. Known to be a very precocious kid, he learned to play the drums at five years old, the piano at eight, and showcased his talents weekly as a church musician. He was a reluctant singer, to say the least. However, in high school, he began to break out of his shell; eventually, sharing his talents with the public rather than singing alone in his living room.

He attended Whitney Young Magnet High School, where not only did he become known for his musical talents, but also learned how to record and produce music, as a member of the school's podcast initiative. Those skills would prove to be significant in college as he recorded his first songs including his first viral hit "No Gray" in his dorm room. He was also a member of the Whitney Young Concert Choir.

== Music career ==
His music career was started in 2012, with the release of Life Music on September 25, 2012, by Light Records and Entertainment One Music. This was his breakthrough released on the Billboard charts, and it placed at No. 98 on Billboard 200 along with Gospel Albums at No. 3, and at No. 23 on the Independent Albums chart. His song "No Gray" was a viral smash that earned him TV appearances on BET's Celebration of Gospel and fans in India Arie and Nicki Minaj.

McReynolds' second album Life Music: Stage Two was Grammy Award nominated, a Billboard Gospel No. 1 album for four weeks, and a GMA Dove Award winner. It featured Israel Houghton, India.Arie and Chantae Cann and his first top five gospel hit "Gotta Have You." Rating the album five stars for Journal of Gospel Music, Bob Marovich says, "Life Music, Stage Two is the musical manifestation of his honest and spiritually grounded approach to dealing with the vicissitudes of daily life." McReynolds brought on yet another popular R&B talent, Tweet, on his EP Sessions (2016) This unannounced, surprise release reached the No. 1 on the iTunes Christian chart in one night.

McReynolds' third album Make Room was his biggest success yet, earning him eight Stellar Awards and two Grammy Award nominations. It also debuted No. 1 on Billboard Gospel charts. Make Room touted his first No. 1 radio hit "Not Lucky, I'm Loved" and the huge viral smash "Cycles." This album garnered public support from stars of different cultures and genres like Justin Bieber, Kandi Burruss, and millions of listeners around the world. This project gave strong evidence to Kirk Franklin's claim that McReynolds is, in fact, "the future of Gospel Music." In March 2018, he broke major ground for gospel, when his one-hour TV special "Make Room" aired multiple times on TVOne. He was also the first in his genre to form a major partnership with Tidal. If all that was not enough, McReynolds just missed the bestseller list with his book "Make Room: Finding Where Faith Fits" that he released in the fall of 2018.

In June 2019, McReynolds co-starred as a judge with Kirk Franklin, Kelly Price and Erica Campbell, on Season 9 of BET's Sunday Best. In 2020 he released People, an EP with "Moving On," the 2021 Grammy winner for Best Gospel Performance/Song.

Soon after the Grammy win, "Favorite Son" a highly successful BET+ movie was released. His first acting role ever, McReynolds played the lead role alongside Rotimi, Serayah, and Loren Lott.

In August 2021, McReynolds earned his fourth straight Gospel Airplay No. 1 with "Grace."

In August 2024, McReynolds performed at the 2024 Democratic National Convention.

McReynolds released his second book, "Before You Climb Any Higher: Valley Wisdom for Mountain Dreams," in February 2025.

== Personal life ==
In 2016, McReynolds established Elihu Nation, his non-profit that is geared to "celebrate, promote, and work to create young seekers and models of wisdom." It has organized several events aimed at Christian scholarship and self-help and has awarded at least $30,000 in college scholarships.

Between touring, recording and TV appearances, McReynolds has taught for five years at his alma mater Columbia College Chicago in the music department. His contribution to society outside of music is important to him. In addition to completing his bachelor's degree in music at Columbia College, he earned a master's degree in Biblical studies from Moody Theological Seminary in 2015.

In 2018, McReynolds was admitted into Mensa, an international society for high IQ individuals and became an honorary member of Alpha Nu Omega, Inc., an international Christian fraternity.

In 2024, McReynolds became a dual citizen of the United States and Ghana at an event held at the Accra International Conference Centre (AICC), where then-President of Ghana, Nana Addo Dankwa Akufo-Addo granted Ghanaian citizenship to 524 diasporans.

McReynolds is the uncle of actor Khalil Everage.

== Discography ==
List of studio albums, with selected chart positions
Title	Album details	Peak chart positions		
Title	Album details	US	US Gospel	US Indie
Life Music	Released: September 25, 2012; Label: Light/Entertainment One; Formats: CD, digital download	98	3	23
Life Music: Stage Two	Released: September 18, 2015; Label: Light/Entertainment One; Formats: CD, digital download	44	1	11
Make Room	Released: March 9, 2018; Label: Light/Entertainment One; Formats: CD, digital download	97	1	5
People	Released: April 24, 2020; Label: Light/Entertainment One; Formats: CD, digital download	— (Note: People did not enter the Billboard 200 chart, but peaked at No. 40 on the Top Album Sales chart.)	2	—
My Truth	Released: February 17, 2023; Label: MNRK Records LP; Formats: CD, digital download	—	3	—
Closer	Releasing: March 27, 2026; Label: Life Room, Capitol CMG; Formats: CD, LP, digital download, streaming	— (Note: Closer did not enter the Billboard 200 chart, but peaked at No. 46 on the Top Album Sales chart.)	1	—
"—" denotes a recording that did not chart or was not released in that territory.

=== Singles ===
==== As lead artist ====
Title	Year	Peak chart positions			Album
Title	Year	US Gospel	US Gospel Air	US Gospel Digital	Album
"I Love You"	2012	16	16	21	Life Music
"Lovin' Me"	2013	23	23	6	Life Music
"Mary, Did You Know"	2014	18	28	17	Non-album single
"Gotta Have You"	2015	—	5	8	Life Music: Stage Two
"Pressure"	2015	9	—	2	Life Music: Stage Two
"Not Lucky, I'm Loved"	2017	4	1	1	Make Room
"Cycles" (featuring DOE)	2018	16	—	3	Make Room
"Make Room"	2019	5	1	4	Make Room
"People"	2020	11	—	1	People
"Movin' On" (with Mali Music)	2020	4	1	1	Johnny x Mali: Live in LA
"Adulting" (with Mali Music)	2021	—	—	14	Johnny x Mali: Live in LA
"The Greatest Adventure"	2021	—	—	—	Non-album single
"Your World"	2022	5	1	5	My Truth
"Detail"	2023	—	—	—	My Truth
"Able" (featuring Marvin Winans)	2024	6	1	14	My Truth
"Pray for Me" (with Jor'Dan Armstrong)	2025	—	—	—	Non-album single
"Still" (with Jamal Roberts)	2025	4	1	3	Closer
"Echo"	2026	—	26	—	Closer
"—" denotes a recording that did not chart or was not released in that territory.

==== As featured artist ====
Title	Year	Album
"Yours to Use" (Aaron Cole featuring Jonathan McReynolds)	2022	Non-album singles
"Cycles Refix" (Shadrack SBS featuring Jonathan McReynolds)	2023	Non-album singles
"Finished Work Reprise" (Shekinah Glory Ministry featuring Jonathan McReynolds)	2023	Fresh Fire
"—" denotes a recording that did not chart or was not released in that territory.

=== Promotional singles ===
==== As lead artist ====
Title	Year	Peak chart positions		Album
Title	Year	US Gospel	US Gospel Air	Album
"Red & Green"	2024	—	—	Red & Green (EP)
"Sent Me a King" (featuring Smokie Norful)	2024	11	19	Red & Green (EP)
"New Normal"	2025	—	—	Closer
"—" denotes a recording that did not chart or was not released in that territory.

==== As featured artist ====
Title	Year	Peak chart positions				Album
Title	Year	US Gospel	US Gospel	US Gospel Digital	US Gospel Stream.	Album
"Breathe" (Maverick City Music featuring Jonathan McReynolds and DOE)	2022	31	10	4	9	Breathe (EP)
"Cycles Refix" (Shadrack SBS featuring Jonathan McReynolds)	2023	—	—	—	—	
"Finished Work Reprise" (Shekinah Glory Ministry featuring Jonathan McReynolds)	2023	—	—	—	—	Fresh Fire
"—" denotes a recording that did not chart or was not released in that territory.

=== Other charted songs ===
==== As lead artist ====
Title	Year	Peak chart positions			Album
Title	Year	US Gospel	US Gospel Air	US Gospel Digital	Album
"No Gray"	2014	22	—	13	Life Music
"Gotta Have You"	2015	8	—	—	Life Music: Stage Two
"The Way That You Love Me"	2016	23	—	—	Life Music: Stage Two
"Grace"	2021	10	1	15	People
"For Myself" (featuring Chandler Moore)	2023	10	—	—	My Truth
"Forever Mistletoe"	2025	21	—	—	Red & Green (EP)
"White Christmas"	2025	—	—	8	Red & Green (EP)
"Emoji" (with Jordan G. Welch)	2026	23	—	—	Closer
"—" denotes a recording that did not chart or was not released in that territory.

==== As featured artist ====
Title	Year	Peak chart positions				Album
Title	Year	US Christ.	US Gospel	US Gospel Digital	US Gospel Stream.	Album
"Just as Sure" (Tori Kelly featuring Jonathan McReynolds)	2018	—	11	7	10	Hiding Place
"Again" (Kirk Franklin featuring Chandler Moore, Tori Kelly, Jonathan McReynolds and Jekalyn Carr)	2023	23	9	12	13	Father's Day
"Finished Work Reprise" (Shekinah Glory Ministry featuring Jonathan McReynolds)	2018	—	—	—	—	Fresh Fire
"—" denotes a recording that did not chart or was not released in that territory.

== Accolades ==
=== Dove Awards ===
Year	Nominee / work	Category	Result	Ref.
2015	Gospel Artist of the Year	Himself	Nominated	
2016	Gospel Artist of the Year	Himself	Nominated	
2016	Contemporary Gospel/Urban Recorded Song of the Year	"The Way That You Love Me"	Won	
2016	Short Form Video of the Year	"The Way That You Love Me"	Nominated	
2016	Contemporary Gospel/Urban Album of the Year	Life Music: Stage Two	Nominated	
2018	Contemporary Gospel/Urban Recorded Song of the Year	"Not Lucky, I'm Loved"	Nominated	
2018	Contemporary Gospel/Urban Album of the Year	Make Room	Nominated	
2019	Contemporary Gospel/Urban Recorded Song of the Year	"Make Room"	Nominated	
2020	Gospel Artist of the Year	Himself	Nominated	
2020	Contemporary Gospel Recorded Song of the Year	"People"	Won	
2020	Contemporary Gospel Album of the Year	People	Nominated	
2020	Long Form Music Video of the Year	People	Nominated	
2021	Gospel Artist of the Year	Himself	Nominated	
2021	Contemporary Gospel Album of the Year	Doe (EP) (performed by Doe, credited as producer)	Nominated	
2022	Contemporary Gospel Recorded Song of the Year	"Adulting" (with Mali Music)	Nominated	
2022	Contemporary Gospel Album of the Year	Clarity (performed by Doe, credited as producer)	Won	
2022	Contemporary Gospel Album of the Year	Jonny x Mali: Live in LA (with Mali Music)	Nominated	
2022	Gospel Worship Recorded Song of the Year	"Breathe" (Maverick City Music featuring Doe, McReynolds, and Chandler Moore)	Won	
2023	Contemporary Gospel Recorded Song of the Year	"Your World"	Won	
2023	Contemporary Gospel Album of the Year	My Truth	Nominated	
2024	Contemporary Gospel Recorded Song of the Year	"Able" (featuring Marvin Winans)	Nominated	
2024	Contemporary Gospel Album of the Year	Note to Self (EP) (performed by Doe, credited as producer)	Nominated	
2025	Contemporary Gospel Recorded Song of the Year	"Holy Hands" (performed by Doe, credited as writer)	Won	
2025	Gospel Worship Recorded Song of the Year	"One Hallelujah" (Tasha Cobbs Leonard, Erica Campbell, and Israel Houghton featuring McReynolds and Jekalyn Carr)	Nominated	
2026	Contemporary Gospel Recorded Song of the Year	"Still" (with Jamal Roberts)	Pending	
2026	Contemporary Worship Recorded Song of the Year	"One Good God"	Pending	
2026	Contemporary Gospel Album of the Year	Closer	Pending	

=== Grammy Awards ===
Year	Nominee / work	Category	Result	Ref.
2016	Best Gospel Album	Life Music: Stage Two	Nominated	
2019	Best Gospel Performance/Song	"Cycles" (featuring Doe)	Nominated	
2019	Best Gospel Album	Make Room	Nominated	
2021	Best Gospel Performance/Song	"Movin' On" (with Mali Music)	Won	
2022	Best Gospel Album	Jonny x Mali: Live in LA (with Mali Music)	Nominated	
2024	Best Gospel Album	My Truth	Nominated	
2025	Best Gospel Performance/Song	"Holy Hands" (performed by Doe, credited as writer)	Nominated	
2025	Best Gospel Performance/Song	"One Hallelujah" (Tasha Cobbs Leonard, Erica Campbell, and Israel Houghton featuring McReynolds and Jekalyn Carr)	Won	
2026	Best Gospel Performance/Song	"Still" (with Jamal Roberts)	Nominated	

=== Stellar Awards ===
Year	Nominee / work	Category	Result	Ref.
2022	Artist of the Year	Himself (with Mali Music)	Nominated	
2022	Duo/Chorus Group of the Year	Jonny x Mali: Live in LA (with Mali Music)	Won	
2022	Album of the Year	Jonny x Mali: Live in LA (with Mali Music)	Nominated	
2022	Contemporary Duo/Chorus Group of the Year	Jonny x Mali: Live in LA (with Mali Music)	Won	
2022	Contemporary Album of the Year	Jonny x Mali: Live in LA (with Mali Music)	Nominated	
2022	Special Event Album of the Year	Jonny x Mali: Live in LA (with Mali Music)	Won	
2024	Song of the Year	"Able" (featuring Marvin Winans)	Nominated	
2024	Male Artist of the Year	Himself	Nominated	
2024	Album of the Year	My Truth	Nominated	
2024	Contemporary Male Artist of the Year	Himself	Nominated	
2024	Contemporary Album of the Year	My Truth	Nominated	
2025	Special Event Album of the Year	Red and Green	Nominated	
2025	Recorded Music Packaging of the Year	Red and Green	Nominated	
2026	Male Artist of the Year	Himself	Won	
2026	Contemporary Male Artist of the Year	Himself	Nominated	
2026	Duo/Chorus Group of the Year	"Still" (with Jamal Roberts)	Nominated	
2026	Contemporary Duo/Chorus Group of the Year	"Still" (with Jamal Roberts)	Won	
