= Life Music: Stage Two =

Studio album by Jonathan McReynolds
- Released: September 18, 2015
- Genre: Gospel, Christian R&B, urban contemporary gospel, R&B, neo soul
- Length: 53:27
- Label: Entertainment One
- Producer: Warryn Campbell, Darhyl "DJ" Camper Jr., Chuck Harmony, Israel Houghton, Darryl "Lil Man" Howell, India.Arie, Claude Kelly, Aaron Lindsay, Jonathan McReynolds, PJ Morton, Shannon Sanders

Jonathan McReynolds chronology
Life Music (2012)	Life Music: Stage Two (2015)	Make Room (2018)

Life Music: Stage Two is the second studio album from Jonathan McReynolds. Entertainment One Music released the album on September 18, 2015. McReynolds worked with these producers on this album: Warryn Campbell, Darhyl "DJ" Camper Jr., Chuck Harmony, Israel Houghton, Darryl "Lil Man" Howell, India.Arie, Claude Kelly, Aaron Lindsay, PJ Morton, and Shannon Sanders.

== Critical reception ==
Professional ratings
Review scores
Source	Rating
CCM Magazine	4/5 stars
Cross Rhythms	9/10 squares
Journal of Gospel Music	5/5 stars
New Release Today	4.5/5 stars

Awarding the album four stars at CCM Magazine, Andy Argyrakis states, "hey bring a much needed dose of unswerving spiritual substance to anyone searching for something deeper." Dwayne Lacy, giving the album four and a half stars from New Release Today, writes, "Life Music: Stage Two is a great album lyrically, sonically and organically." Rating the album five stars for Journal of Gospel Music, Bob Marovich says, "Life Music, Stage Two is the musical manifestation of his honest and spiritually grounded approach to dealing with the vicissitudes of daily life." Stephen Luff, assigning the album a nine out of ten for Cross Rhythms, describes, "'Life Music: Stage Two' presents a developing artist who writes music that relates to his audience."

== Track listing ==
No.	Title	Writer(s)	Length
1.	"Got My Love"	Jonathan McReynolds	3:31
2.	"Gotta Have You"	Warryn Campbell, Paul Morton Jr., McReynolds	2:57
3.	"Whole" (featuring India.Arie)	McReynolds, Shannon Sanders, India Simpson	2:44
4.	"Maintain" (featuring Chantae Cann)	McReynolds	4:01
5.	"Pressure"	McReynolds	5:07
6.	"Christ Representers"	McReynolds	4:37
7.	"The Way That You Love Me"	Chuck Harmony, Claude Kelly	4:10
8.	"Full Attention"	DJ Camper, McReynolds	2:59
9.	"Limp"	McReynolds	4:25
10.	"Oh!"	Dominique Jones, McReynolds	3:40
11.	"Stay High" (featuring Derek Minor)	Derek Johnson, McReynolds	4:14
12.	"All Things Well" (featuring Israel Houghton)	Israel Houghton, Aaron Lindsay, McReynolds	4:50
13.	"Jesus" (featuring Corey Barksdale)	Shirley Caesar, Mathias Michael, McReynolds	6:12
Total length:			53:27

== Chart performance ==
Chart (2015)	Peak position
US Billboard 200	44
US Top Gospel Albums (Billboard)	1
US Independent Albums (Billboard)	10
