= Kelontae Gavin =

American gospel singer and worship leader

Kelontae Gavin (born March 28, 1999) is an American gospel singer and worship leader who is known for the gospel radio singles, “No Ordinary Worship” and “Higher.”

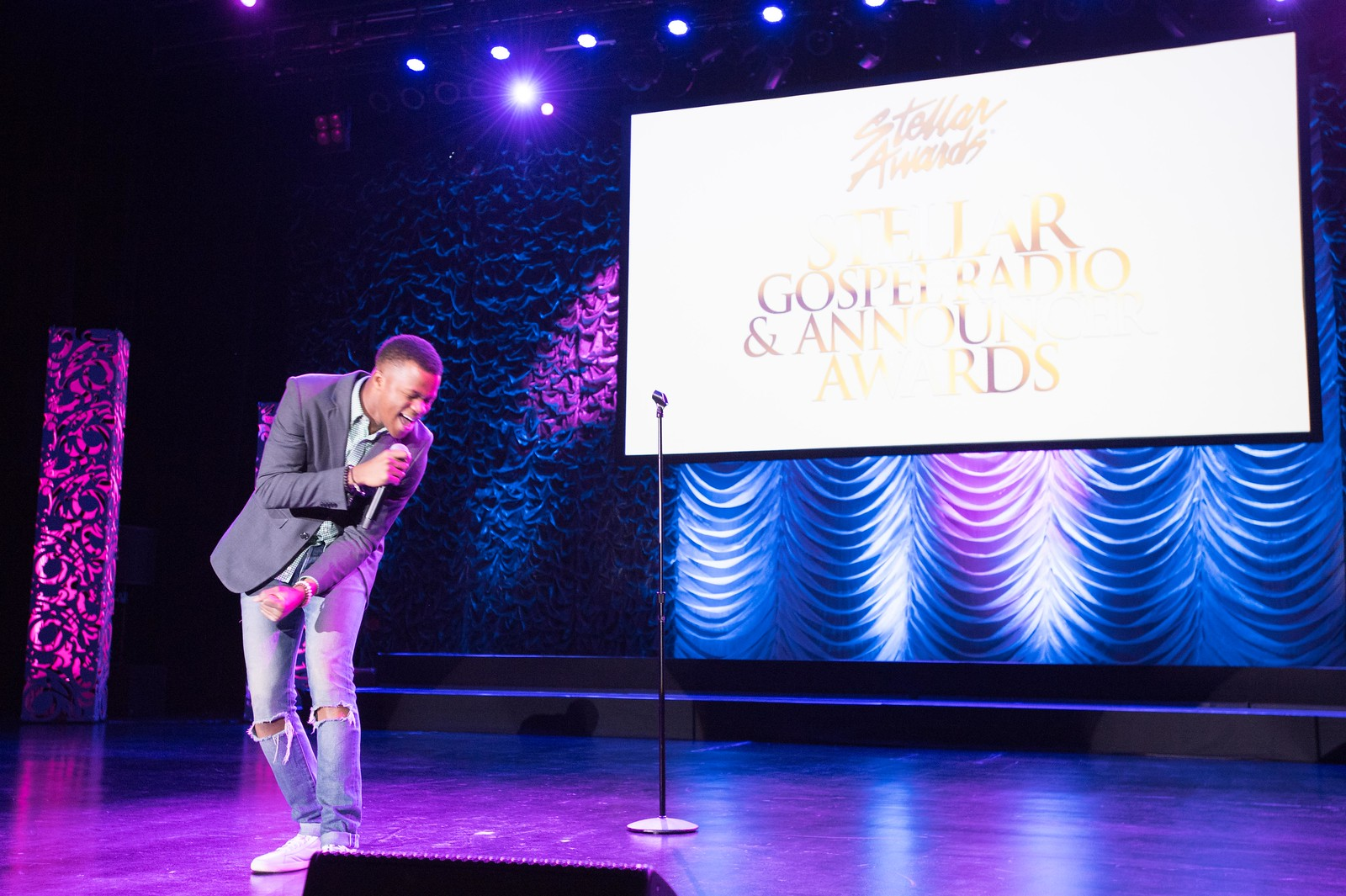
Singer Kelontae Gavin performs at The Stellar Gospel Music Awards' Radio Awards event on March 24, 2018 at the Orleans Ballroom in Las Vegas, Nevada.

== Early life and education ==
Gavin was born in Charleston, South Carolina, but raised in Summerville, South Carolina, where he began to sing at Favor Ministries, a non-denominational church in Ridgeville at the age of four. He was a member of Bold Ministries International in Moncks Corner, South Carolina. He attended Summerville High School. Upon graduation, Gavin stated he planned to serve as a minister at the Ark of Salvation Church in Atlanta, Georgia, and pursue a degree in divinity and theology.

== Career ==
He developed notoriety when a 2014 YouTube video of him singing the hymn, “I Won't Complain,” to a cafeteria worker at his former high school, went viral with over one million YouTube views. In 2016, Gavin was discovered by star-maker manager, Marquis Boone of Marquis Boone Enterprises, who formed a partnership with Tyscot Records to issue the radio single “Higher” in the fall of that year. It was produced by Myron Butler, a Grammy Award-winning singer and songwriter. The song reached the Top 20 on Billboard Magazine's Gospel Indicator chart in the spring of 2017. The song also earned the singer a Stellar Award nomination in the category of Youth Project of the year in January 2018.

Gavin's radio single, "No Ordinary Worship," reached No. 4 on the Billboard Hot Gospel Songs chart in March 2019 while his debut album, "The Higher Experience," made its debut at No. 2 on the Top Gospel Albums chart in spring of 2018. ” The project was given 4/5 stars by Bob Marovich in a Journal of Gospel Music review that spotlighted the radio single. “`No Ordinary Worship' is no ordinary worship song and is likely to become Gavin’s signature song," Marovich wrote. "The most robust piece on the album, it’s a deep southern soul-style ballad that benefits greatly from impassioned singing, sassy responses from the BGVs, and an over-the-top sax solo."

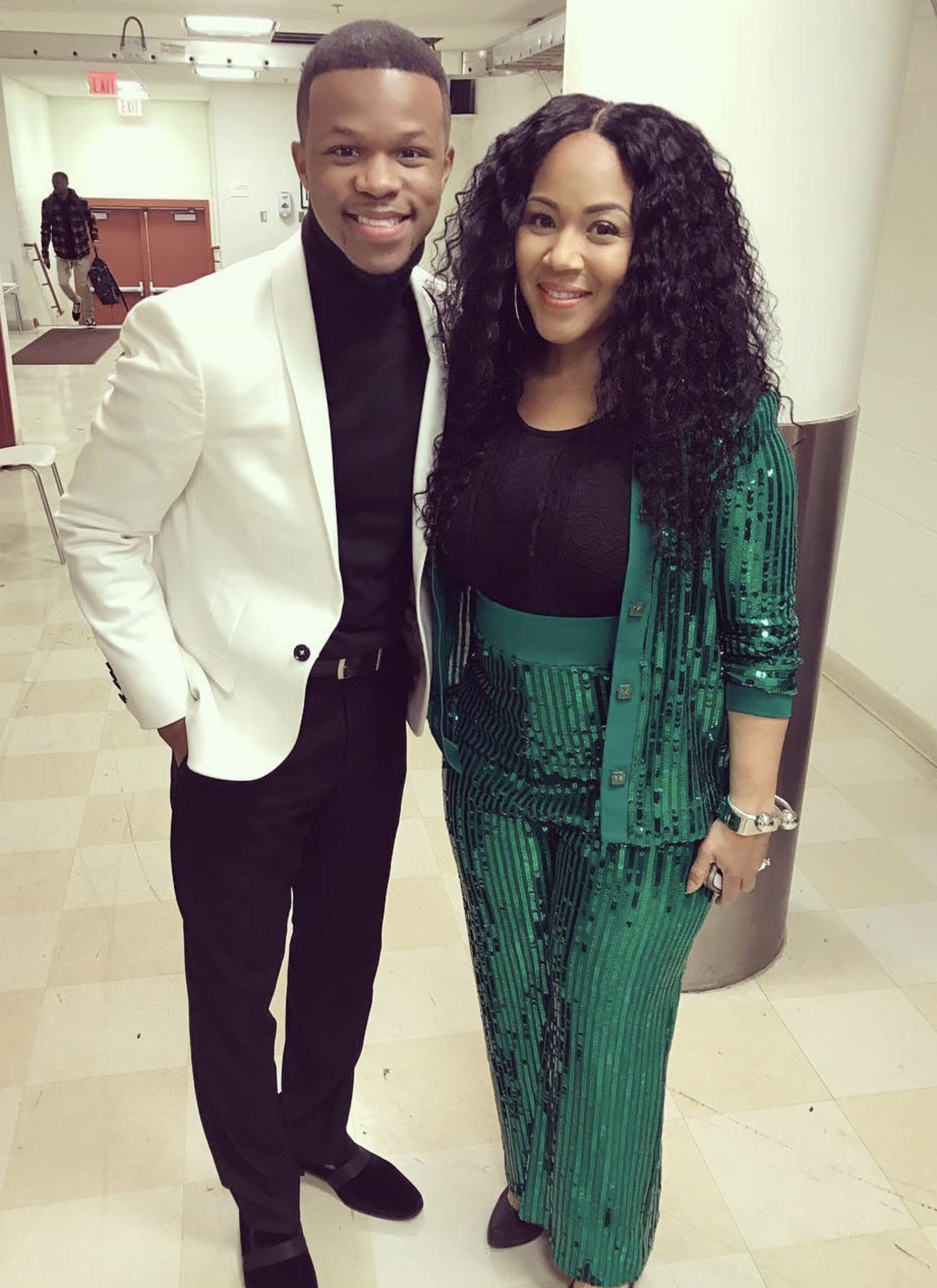
Kelontae Gavin with Erica Campbell

== Discography ==
=== Albums ===
- The Higher Experience (2018)
- The N.O.W. Experience (2021)
- Testify (2023)

=== Singles ===
Title	Year	Peak chart positions	
Title	Year	Gospel Airplay	Top Singles
"Higher"	2016	—	23
"No Ordinary Worship"	2018	5	—

== Awards and nominations ==
Year	Nominee / work	Award	Result
2018	Higher (EP)	Youth Project of the Year (Stellar Awards)	Nominated
2019	Kelontae Gavin	New Artist of the Year (2019 Dove Awards)	Nominated
