= WHBT (AM) =

Radio station in Tallahassee, Florida, United States (1959–2021)

Tallahassee, Florida; United States
- Broadcast area: Tallahassee, Florida
- Frequency: 1410 kHz
- Branding: Heaven 98.3

Programming
- Format: Defunct (was gospel)

Ownership
- Owner: Cumulus Media; (Cumulus Licensing LLC)

History
- First air date: August 6, 1959 (as WRFB)
- Last air date: February 17, 2021
- Former call signs: WRFB (1959–1965); WONS (1965–1980); WKQE (1980–1986); WBGM (1986–1990)

Technical information
- Facility ID: 28162
- Class: D
- Power: 5,000 watts day; 18 watts night
- Transmitter coordinates: 30°29′3.00″N 84°17′13.00″W

Links
- Webcast: Listen live
- Website: heaven983.com

WHBT (1410 AM) was an American gospel music station broadcasting in Tallahassee, Florida, United States. It was licensed to and served the Tallahassee, Florida area. The station was last owned by Cumulus Media. Its studios were located in the westside of Tallahassee and its transmitter site due north of downtown near I-10.

Prior to September 3, 2008, it was a sports/talk radio station known as ESPN 1410 The Fan. It has aired programs from ESPN Radio and its own studios such as Mike and Mike in the Morning, Colin Cowheard, then WHBT Sports Director Ron Vitrano's "Fan Forum". Other programs that aired were Vitrano, and ESPN's Mike Tirico. WHBT was the current home of the University of Miami Hurricanes and Miami Dolphins Football Radio Broadcasts in Tallahassee.

On September 3, 2008, WHBT switched to its final format, gospel music.

Cumulus Media surrendered WHBT's license to the Federal Communications Commission on February 17, 2021. Its license was cancelled on February 18, 2021, and W252BN became a repeater for the HD2 subchannel of sister station WWLD.
