= One Place Live =

One Place

Live album by Tasha Cobbs Leonard
- Released: August 21, 2015
- Recorded: October 13, 2014
- Venue: Redemption World Outreach Center, 635 Haywood Rd, Greenville, South Carolina, 29607
- Genre: Gospel, CCM, traditional black gospel, urban gospel worship, Southern gospel, gospel country
- Length: 64:26
- Label: Motown Gospel

Tasha Cobbs Leonard chronology
Grace (2013)	One Place (2015)	Heart. Passion. Pursuit (2017)

One Place Live is a live album by Tasha Cobbs. Motown Gospel released the album on August 21, 2015. The album was recorded live in Greenville, South Carolina before 3,000 attendees at Redemption Church. This album charted on two Billboard magazine charts, The Billboard 200 at No. 28 and No. 1 on the Gospel Albums chart, selling 13,000 copies during its first week of sales. Some special appearances like Kierra Sheard, Jamie Grace, Jonathan Nelson It has sold 80,000 copies as of September 2016.

== Critical reception ==
Professional ratings
Review scores
Source	Rating
CCM Magazine	4/5 stars
Cross Rhythms	9/10 squares
Journal of Gospel Music	5/5 stars

Awarding the album four stars from CCM Magazine, Matt Conner states, "Cobbs' charisma and power continues to shine." Bob Marovich, giving the release five stars at the Journal of Gospel Music, writes, "The melodic songs, the expert pacing, and the strong singing make this one of the best gospel albums of the year." Rating the album a nine out of ten for Cross Rhythms, Tony Cummings describes, "The...Georgia-born singer and songwriter possesses an astonishing vocal armoury able to sing in a rich and expressive contralto".

== Track listing ==
Track list
No.	Title	Length
1.	"Immediately"	05:12
2.	"Jesus Did It"	02:54
3.	"Fill Me Up"	05:59
4.	"Overflow"	03:42
5.	"Jesus Saves"	05:27
6.	"One Place" (featuring Bertha Cobbs)	07:08
7.	"I Love This Place"	03:04
8.	"This Is The Freedom"	05:22
9.	"Sense It"	07:57
10.	"Put A Praise On It" (featuring Kierra Sheard)	06:17
11.	"I'd Do It Again" (featuring William Murphy III, Bishop Paul Morton, Pastor Bryan Pierce)	04:55
12.	"Solid Rock" (featuring Jamie Grace)	06:41
Total length:		64:27

== Chart performance ==
Chart (2015)	Peak position
US Billboard 200	28
US Top Gospel Albums (Billboard)	1
