= Tasha Cobbs Leonard =

American gospel musician (born 1981)

Pastor Tasha Cobbs-Leonard
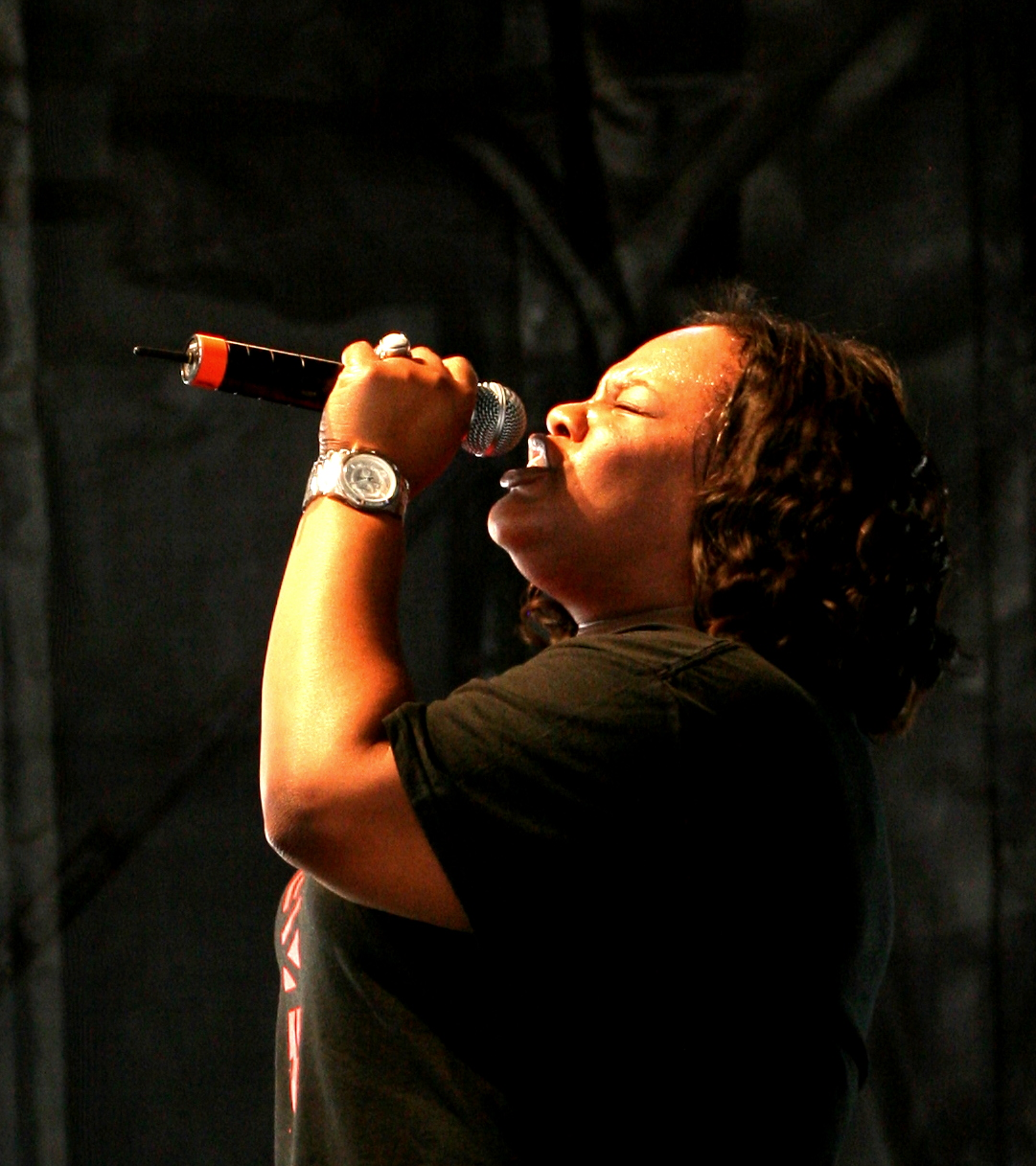
- Cobbs in 2015

Background information
- Also known as: Tasha Cobbs; Pastor Tasha C. Leonard
- Born: Natasha Tameika Cobbs; July 7, 1981 (age 45); Jesup, Georgia, U.S.
- Origin: Atlanta, Georgia, U.S.
- Genres: CCM; urban contemporary gospel
- Occupations: Singer; songwriter
- Years active: 2013–present
- Labels: EMI Gospel; Motown Gospel; TeeLee Records (Tasha's record label)
- Spouse: Kenneth Leonard (m. 2017)
- Website: tashacobbsleonard.com

Natasha Tameika Cobbs-Leonard (born July 7, 1981), better known by her stage name Tasha Cobbs, is an American gospel singer, musician, and songwriter. She released her major label debut album Grace in 2013 with the hit lead single "Break Every Chain". The album reached No. 61 on the Billboard charts. Her biggest hit song was "Break Every Chain".

Cobbs Leonard has won various awards during her music career, including 3 Billboard Music Awards, 12 Dove Awards, 3 Grammy Awards, and 16 Stellar Awards.

== Early life ==
Natasha Tameika Cobbs was born on July 7, 1981, in Jesup, Georgia, to Bishop Fritz Cobbs (1954–2014) and Pastor Bertha Cobbs. She started leading worship at Jesup New Life Ministries, founded by her father.

== Personal life ==
In 2016, Cobbs-Leonard revealed that she had been diagnosed with depression in 2007.

On March 3, 2017, in a private ceremony attended by family and friends, she married Kenneth Leonard, a music producer and her longtime love. Leonard brought into the marriage three children, Alanaa, Nehemiah, and Symphony. In July 2021, they adopted a son, Asher.

== Ministry ==
In 2006, she moved to Atlanta and became a charter member of the dReam Center Church of Atlanta under the leadership of Bishop William Murphy. She was ordained as an Elder and led praise & worship and managing the Worship and Arts department until 2020. In 2018, she appeared as herself in the film Sinners Wanted.

In 2020, Cobbs-Leonard and her husband, Kenneth Leonard, founded The Purpose Place Church in Spartanburg, South Carolina, where they co-pastor. Bishop William Murphy continues to serve as Cobbs-Leonard's spiritual father and mentor.

== Music career ==
She started her solo music career in 2010 with the independently self-released album Smile. The album got the attention of EMI Gospel (now Motown Gospel), and they released, Grace, on February 5, 2013. This was listed on two Billboard charts: the Billboard 200 at No. 61, and at No. 2 on the Top Gospel Albums chart. The EP later reached No. 1 on the Top Gospel Albums chart. The singles "Break Every Chain" and "For Your Glory" also reached No. 1 on the Hot Gospel Songs charts. At the 56th Annual Grammy Awards in 2014, Tasha Cobbs took home Best Gospel/Contemporary Christian Music Performance, winning her first Grammy. Cobbs also won Gospel Performance of the Year, Contemporary Gospel/Urban Song (and Album) Of The Year at the 44th GMA Dove Awards. In 2015, Cobbs was awarded the Gospel Artist of the Year, at the 46th GMA Dove Awards.

== Discography ==
=== Albums ===
==== Studio albums ====
List of studio albums, with selected chart positions
Title	Project details	Peak chart positions			Certifications	Sales
Title	Project details	US	US Gospel	UK C&G	Certifications	Sales
Smile	Released: July 7, 2010; Label: Tasha Cobbs; Formats: CD, digital download	—	23	—		
Grace	Released: February 5, 2013; Label: EMI Gospel/Motown Gospel; Formats: CD, digital download; EP with 8 tracks and deluxe edition with 10 tracks	61	1	—	RIAA: Gold	US: 178,000
Heart. Passion. Pursuit.	Released: August 25, 2017; Label: Capitol Christian Music Group/Motown Gospel; Formats: CD, digital download; Standard edition with 10 tracks and deluxe edition with 16 tracks	35	1	19		
Hymns	Released: October 7, 2022; Label: TeeLee/Motown Gospel; Formats: CD, digital download	—	3	—		
Tasha	Released: July 25, 2025; Label: Motown Gospel; Formats: CD, digital download	— (Note: Tasha did not enter the Billboard 200, but peaked at No. 41 on the Billboard Top Album Sales)	1	—		
"—" denotes a recording that did not chart or was not released in that territory

==== Live albums ====
List of live albums, with selected chart positions
Title	Project details	Peak chart positions			Sales
Title	Project details	US	US Gospel	UK C&G	Sales
One Place: Live	Released: August 21, 2015; Label: Capitol Christian Music Group/Motown Gospel; Formats: CD, digital download; Standard edition with 12 tracks and deluxe edition with 16 tracks	28	1	—	US: 80,000
Heart. Passion. Pursuit.: Live at Passion City Church	Released: November 2, 2018; Label: Capitol Christian Music Group/Motown Gospel; Formats: CD, digital download	—	1	—	
Smile (Reissued Live)	Released: November 22, 2019; Label: Capitol Christian Music Group/Motown Gospel; Formats: CD, digital download	—	—	—	
Royalty (Live at the Ryman)	Released: September 25, 2020; Label: TeeLee/Capitol Christian Music Group/Motown Gospel; Formats: CD, digital download	—	1	—	
Tasha Unscripted	Released: September 11, 2026; Label: TeeLee/Capitol Christian Music Group/Motown Gospel; Formats: CD, LP, digital download	—	5	—	
"—" denotes a recording that did not chart or was not released in that territory

==== Compilation albums ====
List of compilation albums, with selected chart positions
Title	Project details	Peak chart positions			Sales
Title	Project details	US	US Gospel	UK C&G	Sales
10 Years of Tasha	Released: June 2, 2023; Label: Motown Gospel; Formats: Digital download	—	10	9	
"—" denotes a recording that did not chart or was not released in that territory

=== Singles ===
==== As a lead artist ====
Title	Year	Peak chart Positions		Certifications	Album
Title	Year	US Gospel	US Adult R&B	Certifications	Album
"Break Every Chain"	2012	1	29	RIAA: Platinum	Grace
"For Your Glory"	2012	1	—	RIAA: Gold	Grace
"O Come All Ye Faithful"	2012	21	—		Motown Christmas
"Fill Me Up"	2015	25	—	RIAA: Gold	One Place
"Overflow"	2015	16	—	RIAA: Gold	One Place
"Jesus Saves"	2015	10	—		One Place
"Put a Praise on It" (featuring Kierra Sheard)	2015	2	—	RIAA: Gold	One Place
"Great God"	2017	13	—		Heart. Passion. Pursuit.
"I'm Getting Ready" (featuring Nicki Minaj)	2017	1	—		Heart. Passion. Pursuit.
"Your Spirit"	2018	—	—	RIAA: Platinum	Non-album single
"This Is a Move"	2019	4	—		Non-album single
"O Holy Night"	2019	—	—		Non-album single
"In Spite Of Me" (featuring Ciara)	2020	7	—		Royalty (Live at the Ryman)
"Lift Every Voice and Sing"	2021	—	—		Non-album single
"Gotta Believe"	2021	13	—		Non-album single
"The Moment"	2022	11	—		Hymns (Live)

==== As a featured artist ====
Title	Year	Peak chart Positions			Album
Title	Year	US Gospel	US Christ	US Adult R&B	Album
"My World Needs You" (Kirk Franklin featuring Sarah Reeves, Tasha Cobbs and Tamela Mann)	2015	4	—	—	Losing My Religion
"Gracefully Broken" (Matt Redman featuring Tasha Cobbs Leonard)	2017	—	18	—	Glory Song
"Together (We'll Get Through This)" (Steven Curtis Chapman featuring Brad Paisley, Tasha Cobbs Leonard and Lauren Alaina)	2020	—	36	—	—N/a
"Something Has To Break" (Kierra Sheard featuring Tasha Cobbs Leonard)	2022	5	—	—	Kierra
"What He's Done" (Passion featuring Kristian Stanfill, Tasha Cobbs Leonard and Anna Golden)	2022	12	34	—	Burn Bright
"Your Power" (Lecrae featuring Tasha Cobbs Leonard)	2023	8	27	—	—N/a
"More Than Able" (Maverick City Music, Chandler Moore & Naomi Raine featuring Tasha Cobbs Leonard)	2023	8	23	—	—N/a
"In the Room" (Maverick City Music, Chandler Moore & Naomi Raine featuring Tasha Cobbs Leonard)	2023	2	11	—	—N/a
"You Carried Me" (Jekalyn Carr featuring Tasha Cobbs Leonard and Blanca)	2024	25	—	—	JEKALYN

==== Other charted and certified songs ====
Title	Year	Peak chart Positions			Certifications	Album
Title	Year	US Bubb.	US Gospel	US Adult R&B	Certifications	Album
"We Give You Glory" (James Fortune & FIYA featuring Tasha Cobbs)	2014	—	18	—		Live Through It
"Gracefully Broken"	2017	—	16	—	RIAA: Gold	Heart. Passion. Pursuit.
"Here As in Heaven" (Elevation Collective featuring Tasha Cobbs Leonard)	2018	—	22	—		Evidence
"You Know My Name "	2018	—	2	—	RIAA: Platinum	Heart. Passion. Pursuit.: Live at Passion City Church
"Blessings" (Nicki Minaj featuring Tasha Cobbs Leonard)	2023	22	1	—		Pink Friday 2
"Burdens Down"	2024	—	25	—		Hymns (Live)
"One Word"	2026	—	9	—		Tasha Unscripted

=== Guest appearances ===
Song	Year	Artist	Album
"Little Chicago Boy"	2016	Common	Black America Again
"My World Needs You" (featuring Sarah Reeves, Tasha Cobbs and Tamela Mann)	2016	Kirk Franklin	Losing My Religion
"Jesus Is Willing"	2017	Kristene DiMarco	Where His Light Was
"Rattle!"	2020	Brandon Lake	House of Miracles
"Blessings"	2023	Nicki Minaj	Pink Friday 2

== Awards and nominations ==
=== American Music Awards ===
Year	Category	Work	Result
2021	Favorite Artist – Gospel	Herself	Nominated

=== ASCAP Rhythm and Soul Awards ===
Year	Category	Work	Result
2017	Award Winning Gospel Songs	"Put a Praise on it"	Won
2019	Award Winning Gospel Songs	"I'm Getting Ready"	Won
2020	Award Winning Gospel Songs	"You Know My Name"	Won
2022	Award Winning Gospel Songs	"In Spite of Me"	Won
2022	Award Winning Gospel Songs	"Jehovah Jireh"	Won

=== BET Awards ===
Year	Category	Work	Result
2016	Best Gospel Artist	Herself	Nominated
2017	Dr. Bobby Jones Best Gospel/Inspirational Award	"My World Needs You" (Kirk Franklin featuring Sarah Reeves, Tasha Cobbs & Tamela Mann)	Nominated
2018	Dr. Bobby Jones Best Gospel/Inspirational Award	"I'm Getting Ready" (featuring Nicki Minaj)	Nominated
2026	Dr. Bobby Jones Best Gospel/Inspirational Award	"Already Good (Tasha Slide)"	Pending
2026	Her Award	"Already Good (Tasha Slide)"	Pending
2026	Dr. Bobby Jones Best Gospel/Inspirational Award	"Church" (with John Legend)	Pending

=== Billboard Music Awards ===
Year	Category	Work	Result
2016	Top Gospel Artist	Herself	Nominated
2016	Top Gospel Album	One Place Live	Nominated
2017	Top Gospel Album	One Place Live	Nominated
2017	Top Gospel Song	"Put a Praise On It" (featuring Kierra Sheard)	Nominated
2018	Top Gospel Album	Heart. Passion. Pursuit.	Won
2018	Top Gospel Artist	Herself	Won
2019	Top Gospel Artist	Herself	Won
2020	Top Gospel Artist	Herself	Nominated
2021	Top Gospel Artist	Herself	Nominated

=== GMA Dove Awards ===
Year	Category	Work	Result
2013	Song of the Year	"Break Every Chain"	Nominated
2013	Gospel Performance of the Year	"Break Every Chain"	Won
2013	Contemporary Gospel/Urban Recorded Song of the Year	"Break Every Chain"	Won
2013	Contemporary Gospel/Urban Album of the Year	Grace	Won
2013	New Artist of the Year	Herself	Nominated
2015	Gospel Artist of the Year	Herself	Won
2016	Gospel Artist of the Year	Herself	Nominated
2016	Urban Worship Recorded Song of the Year	"Fill Me Up"	Nominated
2016	Urban Worship Album of the Year	One Place Live	Nominated
2016	Traditional Gospel Recorded Song of the Year	"Put a Praise On It"	Nominated
2017	Gospel Artist of the Year	Herself	Nominated
2018	Gospel Artist of the Year	Herself	Won
2018	Artist of the Year	Herself	Nominated
2018	Urban Worship Recorded Song of the Year	"The Name Of Our God"	Nominated
2018	Urban Worship Album of the Year	Heart. Passion. Pursuit.	Won
2019	Gospel Artist of the Year	Herself	Nominated
2019	Gospel Worship Recorded Song of the Year	"This Is A Move (Live)"	Won
2019	Gospel Worship Album of the Year	Heart. Passion. Pursuit. (Live)	Won
2019	Gospel Worship Album of the Year	Settle Here (credited as producer)	Nominated
2020	Gospel Artist of the Year	Herself	Won
2020	Artist of the Year	Herself	Nominated
2020	Gospel Worship Recorded Song of the Year	"Something Has To Break (Live)" (Kierra Sheard featuring Tasha Cobbs Leonard)	Won
2021	Gospel Artist of the Year	Herself	Nominated
2022	Contemporary Gospel Recorded Song of the Year	"Gotta Believe"	Won
2022	Inspirational Recorded Song of the Year	"Life Every Voice and Sing"	Nominated
2023	Inspirational Recorded Song of the Year	Hymns (Live)	Won
2023	Traditional Gospel Recorded Song of the Year	"It Is Well"	Won
2023	Gospel Worship Recorded Song of the Year	"The Moment (Live)"	Nominated
2024	Traditional Gospel Recorded Song of the Year	"Burdens Down (Live)"	Nominated
2025	Contemporary Gospel Recorded Song of the Year	"In The Room (Afro Beat Version)" (as songwriter for Maverick City Music and Annatoria)	Nominated
2025	Gospel Worship Recorded Song of the Year	"One Hallelujah"	Nominated
2026	Contemporary Gospel Recorded Song of the Year	"Already Good (Tasha Slide)"	Pending
2026	Traditional Gospel Recorded Song of the Year	"Church"	Pending
2026	Contemporary Gospel Album of the Year	Tasha	Pending

=== Grammy Awards ===
Year	Category	Work	Result
2014	Best Gospel/Contemporary Christian Music Performance	"Break Every Chain (Live)"	Won
2014	Best Gospel Album	Grace	Nominated
2016	Best Gospel Album	One Place Live	Nominated
2020	Best Gospel Performance/Song	"This Is a Move (Live)"	Nominated
2022	Best Gospel Album	Royalty: Live At The Ryman	Nominated
2024	Best Gospel Album	Hymns (Live)	Nominated
2024	Best Contemporary Christian Music Performance/Song	"Your Power"	Won
2025	Best Contemporary Christian Music Performance/Song	"In The Room"	Nominated
2025	Best Gospel Performance/Song	"One Hallelujah"	Won
2026	Best Gospel Performance/Song	"Church"	Nominated
2026	Best Gospel Album	Tasha	Nominated

=== NAACP Image Awards ===
Year	Category	Work	Result
2018	Outstanding Gospel Album – Traditional or Contemporary	Heart. Passion. Pursuit.	Nominated
2019	Outstanding Gospel Album – Traditional or Contemporary	Heart. Passion. Pursuit. Live at Passion City Church	Nominated
2026	Outstanding Gospel/Christian Album	Tasha	Won
2026	Outstanding Gospel/Christian Song	"Church" (with John Legend)	Nominated

=== Soul Train Music Awards ===
Year	Category	Work	Result
2013	Best Gospel/Inspirational Song	"Break Every Chain"	Nominated
2019	Best Gospel/Inspirational Award	Herself	Nominated
2021	Best Gospel/Inspirational Award	Herself	Nominated

=== Stellar Awards ===
Year	Category	Work	Result
2014	Contemporary CD of the Year	Grace	Won
2014	Contemporary Female Vocalist of the Year	Grace	Won
2014	New Artist of the Year	Grace	Won
2014	Artist of the Year	Grace	Nominated
2014	Albertina Walker Female Vocalist of the Year	Grace	Nominated
2014	CD of the Year	Grace	Nominated
2014	Contemporary Artist of the Year	Grace	Nominated
2015	Albertina Walker Female Vocalist of the Year	One Place Live	Won
2015	Contemporary Female Vocalist of the Year	One Place Live	Won
2015	Praise & Worship CD of the Year	One Place Live	Won
2015	Artist of the Year	One Place Live	Nominated
2015	CD of the Year	One Place Live	Nominated
2015	Contemporary CD of the Year	One Place Live	Nominated
2018	Albertina Walker Female Vocalist of the Year	Heart. Passion. Pursuit.	Won
2018	Contemporary CD of the Year	Heart. Passion. Pursuit.	Won
2018	Contemporary Female Vocalist of the Year	Heart. Passion. Pursuit.	Won
2018	Artist of the Year	Heart. Passion. Pursuit.	Nominated
2018	CD of the Year	Heart. Passion. Pursuit.	Nominated
2018	Praise & Worship CD of the Year	Heart. Passion. Pursuit.	Nominated
2018	Urban/Inspirational Single or Performance of the Year	"I'm Getting Ready" (featuring Nicki Minaj)	Nominated
2019	Song of the Year	"You Know My Name (Live)" (with Brenton Brown)	Nominated
2020	Artist of the Year	Heart. Passion. Pursuit. (Live at Passion City Church)	Won
2020	Contemporary Female Vocalist of the Year	Heart. Passion. Pursuit. (Live at Passion City Church)	Won
2020	Album of the Year	Heart. Passion. Pursuit. (Live at Passion City Church)	Nominated
2021	Song of the Year	"Something Has to Break (Live)" (with Kierra Sheard)	Won
2021	Albertina Walker Female Artist of the Year	Royalty: Live at the Ryman	Won
2021	Contemporary Female Artist of the Year	Royalty: Live at the Ryman	Won
2021	Praise & Worship Album of the Year	Royalty: Live at the Ryman	Won
2023	Praise & Worship Album of the Year	Hymns	Won
2023	Artist of the Year	Hymns	Nominated
2023	Albertina Walker Female Artist of the Year	Hymns	Nominated
2023	Contemporary Female Artist of the Year	Hymns	Nominated
2023	Praise & Worship Song of the Year	"The Moment"	Nominated
2026	Aretha Franklin Icon Award	Herself	Honored
2026	Contemporary Female Artist of the Year	Herself	Nominated
2026	Artist of the Year	Herself	Nominated
2026	Albertina Walker Female Artist of the Year	Herself	Nominated
2026	Album of the Year	Tasha	Nominated
2026	Contemporary Album of the Year	Tasha	Nominated
2026	Contemporary Duo/Chorus Group of the Year	"Church" (featuring John Legend)	Nominated
