= Jacky Clark Chisholm =

American Grammy Award-winning singer and songwriter

Jacky Clark-Chisholm
- Also known as: Jacky Clark-Chisholm
- Born: Jacqueline Lenita Cullum; December 29, 1948 (age 77)
- Origin: Detroit, Michigan, U.S.
- Genres: Gospel
- Occupation: Singer, Nurse
- Instrument: Vocals
- Years active: 1966–present
- Labels: Entheos LENITA, Inc./UAMG
- Member of: The Clark Sisters
- Website: https://auntjacky.com/

Jacqueline Lenita Clark-Chisholm (née Cullum; December 29, 1948), known professionally as Jacky Clark-Chisholm, is an American Grammy Award-winning gospel singer, songwriter, and licensed practical nurse who is best known as the eldest member of the American gospel singing group The Clark Sisters.

== Biography ==
=== Early life and career ===
Chisholm was born December 29, 1948, in Detroit Michigan, first daughter of gospel music innovator Dr. Mattie Moss-Clark and her first husband Leo Henry Cullum, Sr. This union also produced her older brother Leo Henry Cullum, Jr. When Chisholm was young, her parents divorced and her mother married Elbert Clark (d. 2001). This union produced her four younger sisters; Denise, Elbernita, Dorinda, and Karen, the group that would one day become The Clark Sisters. She attended Mumford High School in Detroit, Michigan, graduating in 1967. Their mother, who served as the Church of God in Christ's International Minister of Music and taught them to sing together in their father's church, created the gospel singing group The Clark Sisters with Chisholm and her sisters, and they released their first album, "Jesus Has A Lot to Give" in 1973. The group flourished and became known for their live performances and classic songs, including "Is My Living in Vain" and their biggest hit, "You Brought the Sunshine".

=== Solo career ===
On March 29, 2005, Chisholm released her first solo album, Expectancy, on the Entheos Records label. On this album, she teamed up with songwriter/producer Carnell Murrell, Autun Foster and Doreonne Stramler. Recorded live at the Cathedral Center in Detroit, the album's background vocals were supplied by a special assembly of vocalists, which included two of her children, Angel and Aaron Chisholm, as well as Lorenzo Clark, her sister Denise Clark Bradford's son. The choir was directed by Bryon Stanfield. Her vision for the album is simply meant to “minister to the heart and soul, to restore the people of God who’ve been hurt working in the church.” Her signature vocals can be heard on “Oil of God,” “We Are Overcomers” featuring her sister Elbernita "Twinkie" Clark, and the urban Gospel tune “My Soul Says Yes.” The album also features a duet with Jacky and Ron Winans and a special appearance by the Clark Sisters together on “Blessing Me.” On March 25, 2014, Jacky released a single "My Season", accompanied with the song "On My Mind". This was the first release of new material since her 2005 solo debut. In 2020, she released a new single, “Feel Good” featuring Mary J. Blige and rapper Tia P. On November 10, 2023, Jacky released her long-awaited follow-up solo album titled “Jacky?” with 14 tracks and produced by B. Slade and Autun Foster.

=== Stage performer ===
As a performer, Chisholm has often taken major roles in nationally touring gospel stage plays such as Lawd Have Mercy, Mama Don’t, Can A Woman Make A Man Lose His Mind, and The Man of Her Dreams.

Chisholm was portrayed by Broadway theatre actress Angela Birchett in the Lifetime biopic The Clark Sisters: First Ladies of Gospel, released April 11, 2020.

== Musical influence ==
While her sibling counterparts are known for their impassioned vocals, Chisholm in contrast is known as the "sweet-voiced" sister. "I feel there is a need for more music that allows the listener to enter into praise and worship for the Lord," she asserts. "People have a need to meditate upon their own personal relationship with God, and I think that the kind of music I wish to perform will give them the space to reflect on God from their own points of view."

== Other ventures ==
Chisholm is a spokesperson for the American Diabetes Association, and has done radio and television commercials for New York Life Insurance. Moreover, her stature provided her a platform as a motivational speaker for fundraisers such as H.O.P.E. South Africa in Johannesburg, South Africa. Professionally, Chisholm has been an instructor for the American Red Cross for 10 years. She earned a bachelor's degree in Family Life Education and Psychology and plans to open a counseling center for battered women and children.

== Personal life ==
Chisholm was married to Glynn Chisholm from May 5, 1973, until his death on November 28, 2019. Together, they had three children: Aaron, Michael, and Angelyn (Angel), and three grandchildren.

== Discography ==
=== Albums ===
Year	Album	Ref.
2005	Expectancy: 1st solo album; Label: Entheos Records; Format: CD, Digital Download	
2023	Jacky?: 2nd solo album; Label: Peerless Music Group; Format: Digital	

=== Extended plays ===
Year	Album	Ref.
2018	My Season/On My Mind: Remix EP; Released: November 11, 2018; Label: MPP; Format: Digital Download	

=== Singles ===
As lead artist

List of singles, with selected chart positions and sales, showing year released and album name
Title	Year	Peak chart positions	Album
Title	Year	US Gospel Digital	Album
"My Season"	2014	—	Non-album singles
"On My Mind"	2014	—	Non-album singles
"Cover Me"	2017	—	Non-album singles
"Shout"	2017	—	Non-album singles
"Feel Good"(feat. Mary J. Blige)	2020	14	Non-album singles
"My New Season"	2022	-	Non-album singles
"Greatest Part of Me"	2023	—	jacky?
"Bless Him Continually"	2026	—	Non-album single

== Awards ==
=== BET Awards ===
The BET Awards are awarded annually by the Black Entertainment Television network. Jacky Clark Chisholm has received 2 nominations.

Year	Award	Nominated work	Result
2008	Best Gospel Artist	The Clark Sisters	Nominated
2020	Dr. Bobby Jones Best Gospel/Inspirational Award	"Victory"	Nominated

=== Dove Awards ===
The Dove Awards are awarded annually by the Gospel Music Association. Clark Chisholm has won 2 awards from 11 nominations.

Year	Award	Nominated work	Result
1983	Inspirational Black Gospel Album of the Year	Sincerely	Nominated
1987	Contemporary Gospel Album of the Year	Heart & Soul	Won
1995	Traditional Black Gospel Recorded Song of the Year	"Amazing Grace"	Nominated
2008	Artist of the Year	The Clark Sisters	Nominated
2008	Group of the Year	The Clark Sisters	Nominated
2008	Contemporary Gospel Recorded Song of the Year	"Blessed and Highly Favored"	Nominated
2008	Contemporary Gospel Album of the Year	Live – One Last Time	Nominated
2020	Traditional Gospel Recorded Song of the Year	"Victory"	Nominated
2020	Inspirational Film of the Year	The Clark Sisters: First Ladies of Gospel	Nominated
2020	Traditional Gospel Album of the Year	The Return	Won
2026	Contemporary Gospel Recorded Song of the Year	"Jesus I Do" (with Mariah Carey)	Pending

=== Grammy Awards ===
The Grammy Awards are awarded annually by the National Academy of Recording Arts and Sciences. Jacky Clark Chisholm has won 3 awards from 7 nominations, including a Lifetime Achievement award.

Year	Award	Nominated work	Result
1983	Best Soul Gospel Performance by a Duo or Group	Sincerely	Nominated
1987	Best Soul Gospel Performance by a Duo or Group, Choir or Chorus	Heart & Soul	Nominated
1988	Best Soul Gospel Performance by a Duo or Group, Choir or Chorus	Conqueror	Nominated
1990	Best Traditional Soul Gospel Album	Bringing it Back Home	Nominated
2007	Best Gospel Performance	"Blessed & Highly Favored"	Won
2007	Best Traditional Gospel Album	Live: One Last Time	Won
2009	Best R&B Performance by a Duo or Group with Vocals	"Higher Ground"	Nominated
2024	Grammy Lifetime Achievement Award	The Clark Sisters	Honored

=== NAACP Image Awards ===
The NAACP Image Awards are awarded annually by the National Association for the Advancement of Colored People (NAACP). Jacky Clark Chisholm has won 2 awards from 6 nominations.

Year	Award	Nominated work	Result
1983	Outstanding Gospel Artist	The Clark Sisters	Won
1989	Outstanding Gospel Artist	The Clark Sisters	Nominated
2020	Outstanding Gospel/Christian Song – Traditional or Contemporary	"Victory"	Nominated
2021	Outstanding Gospel/Christian Album	The Return	Won
2026	Outstanding Duo, Group or Collaboration (Traditional)	"Jesus I Do" (with Mariah Carey)	Nominated
2026	Outstanding Gospel/Christian Song	"Jesus I Do" (with Mariah Carey)	Nominated

=== Soul Train Awards ===
The Soul Train Music Awards are awarded annually. Jacky Clark Chisholm has received 3 nominations.

Year	Award	Nominated work	Result
1988	Best Gospel Album – Group or Choir	Heart & Soul	Nominated
1989	Best Gospel Album	Conqueror	Nominated
2020	Best Gospel/Inspirational Award	The Clark Sisters	Nominated

=== Stellar Awards ===
The Stellar Awards are awarded annually by SAGMA. Jacky Clark Chisholm has received 8 awards and 2 honorary awards.

Year	Award	Nominated work	Result
2007	The Chevrolet Most Notable Achievement Award	The Clark Sisters	Honored
2008	CD of the Year	Live... One Last Time	Won
2008	Artist of the Year	Live... One Last Time	Won
2008	Group or Duo of the Year	Live... One Last Time	Won
2008	Traditional Group/Duo of the Year	Live... One Last Time	Won
2009	Special Event CD of the Year	Encore: The Best of the Clark Sisters	Won
2010	Special Event CD of the Year	Silky Soul Music... An All-Star Tribute to Maze (with Kierra Sheard and J. Moss)	Won
2020	James Cleveland Lifetime Achievement Award	The Clark Sisters	Honored
2021	Contemporary Duo/Group Chorus of the Year	The Return	Won
2021	Duo/Group Chorus of the Year	The Return	Nominated
2021	Traditional Duo/Group Chorus of the Year	Gospel According to PJ	Won
2026	Contemporary Duo/Chorus Group of the Year	"Jesus I Do" (with Mariah Carey)	Nominated

=== Miscellaneous honors ===
Year	Organization	Award	Nominated work	Result
1999	Michigan's International Gospel Music Hall of Fame		The Clark Sisters	Inducted
2019	Essence Fest's Strength Of A Woman Brunch	Strength of A Woman Award	The Clark Sisters	Honored
2022	Black Music & Entertainment Walk of Fame		The Clark Sisters	Inducted
2025	Missouri Gospel Music Hall of Fame		The Clark Sisters	Inducted
2026	Hollywood Walk of Fame		The Clark Sisters	Inducted
