= Queens of R&B Tour =

2024 concert tour by Xscape and SWV

- Tour by Xscape and SWV
- Start date: June 27, 2024
- End date: August 18, 2024
- Legs: 1
- No. of shows: 30 in North America
- Supporting acts: Mýa; 702; Total; Psiryn; OMG Girlz
Xscape tour chronology
- The Great Xscape Tour
- (2017)
- Queens of R&B Tour
- (2024)
SWV tour chronology
- Summer Block Party Tour
- (2023)
- Queens of R&B Tour
- (2024)
Mýa tour chronology
- T.K.O. Tour
- (2018)
- Queens of R&B Tour
- (2024)

The Queens of R&B Tour was a summer concert tour co-headlined by American girl groups Xscape and SWV. Produced through television personality Mona Scott-Young's multi-media entertainment company Monami Entertainment and Live Nation while represented by Seth Shomes through Day After Day Productions (DADP), the 30-city tour launched June 27 with American singer Mýa and American girl groups 702 and Total featured as special guests.

== Background ==
Originally in 2023, American girl groups Xscape and SWV had collaborated on a 2023 Bravo series entitled SWV & Xscape: The Queens of R&B which chronicle the female musicians as they attempted to get this tour off the ground. However, internal conflicts and a debate over which group would headline delayed the tour.

In March 2024, during Women History Month following a teaser — a hilarious video went viral showing Xscape and SWV in a makeshift therapy session with television personality Mona Scott-Young — on social media that ignited excitement among fans, news of the tour was announced officially on March 25, 2024 on Sherri Shepherd's talk show Sherri.

== Ticketing ==
=== Presale & General sale ===
Tickets for the tour became available starting with a Citi presale on Tuesday, March 26. Additional presales ran throughout the week ahead of the general on sale starting Friday, March 29, at 10:00 AM local time on Ticketmaster.com.

== Critical reception ==
Jim Harrington writing for The Mercury News praised the concert tour and commented, "the show turned out to be as great, and maybe even better, than fans could have hoped for, as the two trios mixed and matched songs — and, most wonderfully, occasionally shared vocals — during the course of a thoroughly entertaining co-headlining set that touched on (at least parts of) some 30 songs." He concluded his review with, "Yet, the most memorable moments came when the two vocal crews took the stage together, with six voices joining in glorious harmony to lift up 13,000 fans on The Clark Sisters powerful gospel number "You Brought the Sunshine (Into My Life)," the gorgeous Xscape ballad "The Arms of the One Who Loves You" and the fun show-closing cover of Lil'Kim's "Not Tonight (Ladies Night Remix)."

== Setlist ==
This setlist is representative of the June 27, 2024 show in Concord, California, not the entire duration of the tour.

702

1. "Steelo"
2. "Beep Me 911"
3. "This Lil' Game We Play"
4. "I Still Love You"
5. "Get It Together"
6. "Where My Girls At?"

Total

1. "Trippin'"
2. "No One Else"
3. "Sittin' Home"
4. "Kissin' You"
5. "What About Us?"
6. "What You Want"
7. "Can't You See"

Mya

1. "Case of the Ex"
2. "Ghetto Supastar (That Is What You Are)"
3. "Best of Me, Part 2"
4. "Girls Dem Sugar"
5. "Fallen" (contains elements of "As")
6. "The Best of Me" / "Ridin'"
7. "Movin' On"
8. "Take Me There"
9. "Can We Talk" (Tevin Campbell cover)
10. "Lady Marmalade"
11. "My Love Is Like...Wo" (contains elements of "Swing My Way")
12. "It's All About Me" (contains elements of "Tell Me")

Xscape & SWV

1. "Can We" (Note: Performed by SWV)
2. "Feels So Good" (Note: Performed by Xscape)
3. "Can't Hang"
4. "Keep On, Keepin' On"
5. "I'm So Into You"
6. "Right Here"
7. "Love on My Mind" / "What's Up" / "Don't Think I'm Not"
8. "You're the One"
9. "You're Always on My Mind"
10. "Use Your Heart"
11. "My Little Secret"
12. "Hold On"
13. "The Arms of the One Who Loves You" (Note: Performed by SWV and Xscape)
14. "Is My Living In Vain"
15. "You Brought the Sunshine (Into My Life)"
16. "It's About Time"
17. "Downtown" (contains elements of "Please Me")
18. "Softest Place on Earth"
19. "Do You Want To"
20. "If Only You Knew"
21. "Tonight"
22. "Rain"
23. "Who Can I Run To"
24. "Weak"
25. "Anything (Old Skool Mix)"
26. "Understanding"
27. "Just Kickin' It"
28. "Not Tonight (Ladies' Night Remix)"

== Tour dates ==
List of 2024 concerts
Date (2024)	City	Country	Venue
June 27	Concord	United States	Concord Pavilion
June 29	Las Vegas	United States	PH Live
July 2	Phoenix	United States	Talking Stick Resort Amphitheatre
July 3	Albuquerque	United States	Isleta Amphitheater
July 5 (Note: With Psiryn.)	Dallas	United States	Dos Equis Pavilion
July 6 (Note: With Psiryn.)	Houston	United States	The Cynthia Woods Mitchell Pavilion
July 9 (Note: With Psiryn.)	North Little Rock	United States	Simmons Bank Arena
July 10 (Note: With Psiryn.)	Birmingham	United States	Legacy Arena
July 12 (Note: With Psiryn.)	Jacksonville	United States	Daily's Place
July 13 (Note: With Psiryn.)	Tampa	United States	MIDFLORIDA Credit Union Amphitheatre
July 14 (Note: With Psiryn.)	West Palm Beach	United States	iTHINK Financial Amphitheatre
July 16 (Note: With The OMG Girlz.) (Note: With Psiryn.)	Atlanta	United States	Lakewood Amphitheatre
July 17 (Note: With The OMG Girlz.) (Note: With Psiryn.)	Charlotte	United States	PNC Music Pavilion
July 19 (Note: Without Mýa.) (Note: With The OMG Girlz.) (Note: With Psiryn.)	Washington D.C.	United States	Capital One Arena
July 20 (Note: With Psiryn.)	Raleigh	United States	Coastal Credit Union Music Park
July 21 (Note: With The OMG Girlz.) (Note: With Psiryn.)	Virginia Beach	United States	Veterans United Home Loans Amphitheater
July 24 (Note: With The OMG Girlz.)	New York	United States	Madison Square Garden
July 25 (Note: With The OMG Girlz.)	Holmdel	United States	PNC Bank Arts Center
July 26 (Note: Without Mýa.) (Note: With The OMG Girlz.)	Boston	United States	TD Garden
July 27	Atlantic City	United States	Atlantic City Boardwalk Hall
August 2 (Note: Without Mýa.) (Note: With The OMG Girlz.)	Bridgeport	United States	Hartford Healthcare Amphitheater
August 3	Syracuse	United States	Empower Federal Credit Union Amphitheater
August 4	Toronto	Canada	Scotiabank Arena
August 6	Buffalo	United States	Darien Lake Amphitheater
August 9	Detroit	United States	Little Caesars Arena
August 10	Cleveland	United States	Blossom Music Center
August 11	Chicago	United States	Credit Union 1 Amphitheatre
August 13	St. Louis	United States	Chaifetz Arena
August 14	Oklahoma City	United States	Paycom Center
August 18 (Note: With The OMG Girlz.)	Los Angeles	United States	Kia Forum
