= You Brought the Sunshine =

Studio album by the Clark Sisters
- Released: 1981
- Recorded: 1980–1981
- Label: Sound of Gospel
- Producers: Elbernita "Twinkie" Clark, Bernard Mendelson, Jeffery Hunt

The Clark Sisters chronology
Is My Living in Vain (1980)	You Brought the Sunshine (1981)	Sincerely (1982)

Singles from You Brought the Sunshine
- 1. "You Brought the Sunshine (Into My Life)" Released: 1983

You Brought the Sunshine is the eighth album released by the Clark Sisters in 1981. In 1983, the album peaked at number three on the US Billboard Top Gospel Albums chart, before appearing on the 1983 and 1984 year-end charts.

The album contained the crossover hit single "You Brought the Sunshine (Into My Life)" which had sold over 200,000 units by November 2, 1985, after peaking at number 16 on US Billboard Hot R&B/Hip-Hop Songs and number 27 on Dance Club Songs in 1983. In 2020, the song reached number 2 on the Gospel Digital Sales chart, and a live recording of the song from the album Live – One Last Time (2007), peaked at number 11 on the Hot Gospel Songs chart.

British musician Blood Orange interpolated the song "Center of Thy Will" on his critically acclaimed album Negro Swan (2018) and Beyoncé sampled "Center of Thy Will" on the song "Church Girl" from her Grammy Award-winning album Renaissance (2022).

== Track listing ==
Credits adapted from the album's liner notes

All tracks are written by Elbernita "Twinkie" Clark.

Side one
No.	Title	Lead vocalist(s)	Length
1.	"You Brought the Sunshine (Into My Life)"	Elbernita "Twinkie" Clark, Karen Clark	5:36
2.	"Center of Thy Will"	Dorinda Clark, Karen Clark	4:14
3.	"Overdose of the Holy Ghost"	Dorinda Clark	4:11
4.	"Endow Me"	Karen Clark	6:00

Side two
No.	Title	Lead vocalist(s)	Length
1.	"He Keeps Me Company"	Elbernita "Twinkie" Clark	5:40
2.	"Walking in the Spirit"	Elbernita "Twinkie" Clark	4:50
3.	"Crown Him Lord Of All"	Jacky Clark, Elbernita "Twinkie" Clark	4:49
4.	"Psalms 31" (featuring Mattie Moss Clark)	Mattie Moss Clark	4:18

== Charts ==
=== Weekly charts ===
Chart (1983)	Peak position
US Top Gospel Albums (Billboard)	3

=== Year-end charts ===
Chart (1983)	Position
US Top Gospel Albums (Billboard)	2
Chart (1984)	Position
US Top Gospel Albums (Billboard)	25
