= Dorinda Clark-Cole =

American gospel singer, born 1957

- Also known as: The Rose of Gospel
- Born: Dorinda Grace Clark; October 19, 1957 (age 69); Detroit, Michigan, U.S
- Origin: Detroit, Michigan
- Genre: Gospel
- Occupations: Evangelist; Singer; Songwriter; Businesswoman
- Instruments: Vocals; piano; organ
- Years active: 1966–present
- Labels: GospoCentric; Light; Karew
- Member of: The Clark Sisters
- Website: theclarksisters.net dorindaclarkcole.com karewrecords.com

Dorinda Grace Clark-Cole (née Clark; October 19, 1957) is an American Grammy Award-winning gospel singer, songwriter, musician, talk show host, and evangelist. Clark–Cole is best known as a member of family vocal group The Clark Sisters and as a daughter of pioneering choral director Mattie Moss Clark. As a member of The Clark Sisters, Clark–Cole has won two Grammy Awards. She is known to the music world as the Rose of Gospel Music.

== Biography ==
=== Early life ===
Clark–Cole was born on October 19, 1957, and raised in Detroit, Michigan, to the late Elbert and Dr. Mattie Moss-Clark.

Clark–Cole began singing at an early age with her sisters Jacky, Denise, Twinkie and Karen. The sisters sang in their father's church and usually performed songs written and composed by their mother. Clark-Cole, a soprano referred to as the "jazzy sister" of the group, helped develop what is known as "The Clark Sound", which often features high and fast melismas, riffs, runs, scats, and soulful growls. Clark–Cole attributes her fiery, convicting singing style to her mother, who saw the gift of singing and preaching in her at an early age. Back in the 1960s and 1970s, when other children their age were playing outside, Clark–Cole and her sisters had to work on their familial harmonies.

Clark–Cole says, "We made a lot of sacrifices. My mom was a stickler for making sure we rehearsed before we went out to perform. She saw the gifts and talents within us and started shaping and molding us. She taught us discipline along with how to use our gifts." Clark sang lead on "Overdose of the Holy Ghost", as well as on "My Redeemer Liveth", the B-side to The Clark Sisters' biggest single "You Brought the Sunshine".

=== Recording career ===
Clark-Cole's self-titled solo debut, Dorinda Clark-Cole, released in June 2002 on Gospo Centric Records/Zomba Label Group, won two Stellar Awards and a Soul Train Lady of Soul Award. The album featured the hit single "I'm Coming Out". Her second album, The Rose of Gospel, was released under the same label in August 2005. The album debuted in Billboard's top 5 on the Gospel charts and garnered a Grammy Nomination for the Best Traditional Soul Gospel album and won 2007 and 2009 Stellar Award for the Best Female Artist of the Year. The live portions of both albums were produced by Asaph Ward.

After being pushed back from a prematurely stated date in late 2007, Clark–Cole's third solo album, also released on Gospo Centric Records/ Zomba Label Group, Take It Back, was released on April 15, 2008. Producers Alex "Asaph" Ward, PAJAM, and Rodney Jerkins contributed to the project. In 2009, Dorinda released a six-song (EP) album entitled In The Face of Change on September 21. It included hit songs such as "Change", written by her son Jay Cole and "BAMM", which was a "Verizon Select". Released on her own ministry label, Harvestime Ministries, the album was never heard of until she announced it the day of its release. A video on YouTube has a preview of all of the new songs on the record. Another solo project, I Survived, was released in August 2011 under a new label, Light Records. The project also contains duet titled "Thank You" with her sister, Twinkie Clark. Clark–Cole was featured on the title track of Kirk Franklin's Hero album. In early 2009, Clark–Cole performed "Nothing but the Truth" for the Sojourner Truth unveiling on Capitol Hill for First Lady Michelle Obama and other officials. As a member of the Clark Sisters, Clark–Cole won three Grammys in 2008. Live – One Last Time won the Best Traditional Gospel Album. Its album track, "Blessed & Highly Favored", won the Best Gospel Performance as well as the individual Best Gospel Song. With the group she appeared nationally on The Tonight Show with Jay Leno, ABC's The View, Bobby Jones Gospel, Lift Every Voice, Gospel Superfest, TBN's Praise the Lord, The Stellar Awards and The Lady of Soul Awards.

=== Personal and religious life ===
Clark-Cole has been evangelizing and making speaking engagements annually for over 30 years, along with her singing career and being a wife and mother. Clark–Cole married Gregory Cole on December 2, 1978, and together they now have 2 children, Nikkia Cole-Beach and Gregory "Jay" Cole Jr. Dr. Cole also has two grandchildren. Clark–Cole ministers nationally as well as internationally in countries such as England, Japan, Germany, France, Korea, and South Africa. She made history in South Africa, having been the first woman to minister in the pulpit to over 4,000 people. Clark-Cole is a staple in the Church of God in Christ of which she is a licensed National Evangelist, Assistant State Mother for the Michigan North Central Ecclesiastical Jurisdiction, Former Vice-President of The Music Department and in 2016, was appointed by Former Presiding Bishop Charles E. Blake as the Elect Lady of the COGIC's International Evangelism Department. She taught at the Clark Conservatory of Music in Detroit and is an administrator of ministry at the Greater Emmanuel Institutional COGIC.

Clark-Cole's preaching ministry has also gained interest within academic spaces. According to scholar of religion Ashon Crawley, By attending to the Black Pentecostal aesthetics of whooping found in Clark-Cole's "Why Do I Come Back for More" sermon, Clark-Cole's homily is examined as producing the worship space as a discontinuous and open sonic space, open to the other voices that both proceeded her moment of being overcome with Spirit -such that other women gathered around, held and hugged her -and extended the preacherly moment by sociality, through opening up and diffusing the very grounds for the concept, for preaching, for listening, for breathing. Crawley would go on to offer a reading of Clark-Cole's whooping that places the fundamental quality of such aesthetic sociality, not in the fact that it can be shared but in the fact that it must be shared by all, for vitality, for life. This sharing in and as commons, Crawley argues, enacts violence against any form of marginalization or oppression.

=== Other career ventures and accomplishments ===
Clark–Cole is the new host of TCT Network's Dorinda Show, co-host of TCT's Celebrate on the Road, former Stellar Awards host, guest judge on Verizon's "How Sweet The Sound" national televised competition, and the former spokes-model for Donna Vinci Clothing, and her "Rose Collection" is now distributed by Terra Mina Fashions. She has since partnered with MR. SONG, a fashion designer of Detroit, in creating The Bloom Collection, a couture collection of hat adorning accessories. She is national radio host of Serving Up Soul with Dorinda Clark Cole which syndicates to 50 affiliated radio stations. She is also the Founder and CEO of Lifeline Productions Inc., which holds an annual Singers & Musicians Conference. Through this conference it is her goal to educate a new generation of ministers of the importance of "keeping ministry in the music" by offering various activities including daily workshops and evening worship services featuring from artists whose ministries have gone beyond ministering in song. In September 2004 she received an honorary Doctorate of Divinity from Mt. Carmel Theological Seminary of Fresno, California.

Clark–Cole says that if she did not have a career in music that she would be "dancing on Broadway", and her dream would be "to sing with Bette Midler, Cher and Celine Dion". She is currently represented by Keith Douglas, CEO of RKD Music Management in Los Angeles, California.

== Discography ==
=== Solo albums ===
Title	Album details	Chart positions			
Title	Album details	US	US Gospel	US Christ.	US Indie
Dorinda Clark-Cole	Released: June 11, 2002; Label: GospoCentric (#70033); Formats: CD, cassette, digital download, streaming	—	5	15	
Live From Houston: The Rose of Gospel	Released: August 16, 2005; Label: GospoCentric (#82876706112); Formats: CD, digital download, streaming	159	3	4	—
Take It Back	Released: 2008; Label: GospoCentric (#710027); Formats: CD, streaming	104	3	—	—
I Survived	Released: August 30, 2011; Label: Light, eOne (#CPD-CD 7229); Formats: CD, digital download, streaming	120	3	—	23
Living It	Released: February 17, 2015; Label: Light (#LIG-CD-7302), eOne (#LIG-CD-7362); Formats: CD, digital download, streaming	—	2	—	14
Determined	Released: November 29, 2024; Label: Malaco; Formats: digital download, streaming	—	—	—	—

=== Collaborative Albums ===
Title	Album details
Right Now God (with Alaska Mass Choir)	Released: December 20, 2006; Label: JDI Records; Formats: CD, digital download, streaming

=== Extended plays ===
List of albums, with selected details
Title	Album details
In the Face of Change	Released: September 21, 2009; Labels: Harvestime Ministries; Formats: Digital download, streaming

=== Singles ===
==== As a lead artist ====
List of singles, as lead artist, with selected chart positions, showing year released and album name
Year	Title	Peak chart positions		Album
Year	Title	US Hot Gospel	US Gospel Airplay	Album
"No Not One" (featuring J Moss)	2002	—	—	Dorinda Clark-Cole
"I'm Coming Out"	2002	—	—	Dorinda Clark-Cole
"Still Here"	2002	—	—	Dorinda Clark-Cole
"Great Is The Lord"	2005	18	18	Live From Houston: The Rose of Gospel
"So Many Times"	2006	21	21	Live From Houston: The Rose of Gospel
"Take It Back"	2008	2	2	Take It Back
"Change"	2009	—	—	Take It Back
"This Is It"	2009	—	—	Take It Back
"Back to You"	2011	9	9	I Survived
"He Brought Me"	2011	16	16	I Survived
"God Will Take Care of You"	2011	—	—	I Survived
"For My Good"	2011	—	—	I Survived
"Thank You" (featuring Twinkie Clark)	2011	—	—	I Survived
"You Are"	2014	25	20	Living It
"Bless This House"	2014	12	9	Living It
"Living It"	2014	—		Living It
"Great and Mighty"	2024	13	1	Determined

==== As featured artist ====
List of singles as featured artist, with selected chart positions, showing year released and album name
Year	Title	Peak chart positions	Album
Year	Title	US Hot Gospel	Album
"Hero" (Kirk Franklin featuring Dorinda Clark Cole)	2005	25	Hero
"YRM (Your Righteous Mind)" (Donald Lawrence & Co. featuring Dorinda Clark Cole)	2010	15	YRM (Your Righteous Mind)
"He Knows" (Karen Clark Sheard featuring Dorinda Clark Cole)	2010	14	All in One
"He Got Up" (VaShawn Mitchell featuring Dorinda Clark Cole, Sean Tillery & Changed)	2018	15	Cross Music

=== Guest appearances ===
- "Hero (featuring Dorinda Clark Cole)" – Kirk Franklin (from Hero)
- "Tis So Sweet" – Dorinda Clark Cole (from Build A Bridge)
- "Higher Ground" – Missy Elliott, Karen Clark Sheard, Kim Burrell, Mary Mary, Dorinda Clark Cole, and Yolanda Adams (from Miss E... So Addictive) (Elektra, 2001)
- "It Will All Be Worth It" – Mary Mary feat. Gospel Legends (from The Sound)
- "I'm Wrapped in You (featuring Dorinda Clark Cole)" – Bishop Eddie L. Long (from The Kingdom, Vol. 1 (feat. GW's))
- "Still Mighty, Still Strong (feat. Dorinda Clark Cole)" – Youthful Praise, Resting on His Promise (2009)
- "This is That" & "Luke 5" (Feat. Dorinda Clark Cole) – (Robi Rivers Presents The Voices of Calvary, LIVE 2015, Rivers of Melody Music Label)
- "Who's On The Lord's Side" (Feat. Dorinda Clark Cole) – Byron Cage, Malaaco 50th Anniversary 2018, Malaaco Records)

== Videography ==
List of albums, with selected details
Title	Album details
Dorinda Clark-Cole Live	Released: June 10, 2003; Label: GospoCentric (#70033); Formats: DVD
Live From Houston: The Rose of Gospel	Released: September 18, 2007; Label: GospoCentric (#828767061290); Formats: DVD

== Filmography ==
Year	Title	Notes
2005, 2009, 2011	Bobby Jones Gospel	Musical guest
2008–present	The Dorinda Show	Host
2009	The View	Musical guest
2009	The Tonight Show with Jay Leno	Musical guest
2010	Life Every Voice	Musical guest
2015	Preachers of Detroit	Herself
2020	Jimmy Kimmel Live!	Musical guest
2023	Grown & Gospel	Herself
2024	The Queen Latifah Show	Musical guest

== Awards ==
=== BET Awards ===
The BET Awards are awarded annually by the Black Entertainment Television network. Dorinda Clark-Cole has received 2 nominations.

Year	Award	Nominated work	Result
2008	Best Gospel Artist	The Clark Sisters	Nominated
2020	Dr. Bobby Jones Best Gospel/Inspirational Award	"Victory"	Nominated

=== BMI Trailblazers of Gospel Music Awards ===
The BMI Trailblazers of Gospel Music Awards are awarded annually. Clark-Cole has been recognized once and honored once.

Year	Award	Nominated work	Result
2022	One of the Most-Performed Songs of the Year	"His Love"	Recognized
2024	Trailblazer of Gospel Music	Herself	Honored

=== Dove Awards ===
The Dove Awards are awarded annually by the Gospel Music Association. Clark-Cole has won 2 awards from 13 nominations.

Year	Award	Nominated work	Result
1983	Inspirational Black Gospel Album of the Year	Sincerely	Nominated
1987	Contemporary Gospel Album of the Year	Heart & Soul	Won
1995	Traditional Black Gospel Recorded Song of the Year	"Amazing Grace"	Nominated
2008	Artist of the Year	The Clark Sisters	Nominated
2008	Group of the Year	The Clark Sisters	Nominated
2008	Contemporary Gospel Recorded Song of the Year	"Blessed and Highly Favored"	Nominated
2008	Contemporary Gospel Album of the Year	Live – One Last Time	Nominated
2009	Traditional Gospel Recorded Song of the Year	"Take It Back"	Nominated
2018	Traditional Gospel Recorded Song of the Year	"He Got Up" (with VaShawn Mitchell)	Nominated
2020	Traditional Gospel Recorded Song of the Year	"Victory"	Nominated
2020	Inspirational Film of the Year	The Clark Sisters: First Ladies of Gospel	Nominated
2020	Traditional Gospel Album of the Year	The Return	Won
2026	Contemporary Gospel Recorded Song of the Year	"Jesus I Do" (with Mariah Carey)	Pending

=== Grammy Awards ===
The Grammy Awards are awarded annually by the National Academy of Recording Arts and Sciences. Dorinda Clark-Cole has won 3 awards from 10 nominations, including a Lifetime Achievement award.

Year	Award	Nominated work	Result
1983'	Best Soul Gospel Performance by a Duo or Group	Sincerely	Nominated
1987	Best Soul Gospel Performance by a Duo or Group, Choir or Chorus	Heart & Soul	Nominated
1988	Best Soul Gospel Performance by a Duo or Group, Choir or Chorus	Conqueror	Nominated
1990	Best Traditional Soul Gospel Album	Bringing it Back Home	Nominated
2005	Best Traditional Soul Gospel Album	Live From Houston (The Rose of Gospel)	Nominated
2007	Best Gospel Performance	"Blessed & Highly Favored"	Won
2007	Best Traditional Gospel Album	Live: One Last Time	Won
2008	Best Traditional Gospel Album	Take It Back	Nominated
2009	Best R&B Performance by a Duo or Group with Vocals	"Higher Ground"	Nominated
2015	Best Gospel Album	Living It	Nominated
2024	Grammy Lifetime Achievement Award	The Clark Sisters	Honored

=== NAACP Image Awards ===
The NAACP Image Awards are awarded annually by the National Association for the Advancement of Colored People (NAACP). Dorinda Clark-Cole has won 2 awards from 6 nominations.

Year	Award	Nominated work	Result
1983	Outstanding Gospel Artist	The Clark Sisters	Won
1989	Outstanding Gospel Artist	The Clark Sisters	Nominated
2020	Outstanding Gospel/Christian Song – Traditional or Contemporary	"Victory"	Nominated
2021	Outstanding Gospel/Christian Album	The Return	Won
2026	Outstanding Duo, Group or Collaboration (Traditional)	"Jesus I Do" (with Mariah Carey)	Nominated
2026	Outstanding Gospel/Christian Song	"Jesus I Do" (with Mariah Carey)	Nominated

=== Soul Train Awards ===
The Soul Train Music Awards are awarded annually. Dorinda Clark-Cole has received 1 award.

Year	Award	Nominated work	Result
Soul Train Music Awards
1988	Best Gospel Album – Group or Choir	Heart & Soul	Nominated
1989	Best Gospel Album	Conqueror	Nominated
2020	Best Gospel/Inspirational Award	The Clark Sisters	Nominated
Soul Train Lady of Soul Awards
2003	Best Gospel Album	Dorinda Clark-Cole	Won

=== Stellar Awards ===
The Stellar Awards are awarded annually by SAGMA. Dorinda Clark-Cole has received 15 awards and 2 honorary awards.

Year	Award	Nominated work	Result
2003	Female Vocalist of the Year	Dorinda Clark-Cole	Won
2003	Traditional Female Vocalist of the Year	Dorinda Clark-Cole	Won
2007	Female Vocalist of the Year	Live From Houston - The Rose of Gospel	Won
2007	Traditional Female Vocalist of the Year	Live From Houston - The Rose of Gospel	Nominated
2007	Traditional CD of the Year	Live From Houston - The Rose of Gospel	Nominated
2007	The Chevrolet Most Notable Achievement Award	The Clark Sisters	Honored
2008	CD of the Year	Live... One Last Time	Won
2008	Artist of the Year	Live... One Last Time	Won
2008	Group or Duo of the Year	Live... One Last Time	Won
2008	Traditional Group/Duo of the Year	Live... One Last Time	Won
2009	Artist of the Year	Take It Back	Nominated
2009	Female Vocalist of the Year	Take It Back	Won
2009	Tradition Female Vocalist of the Year	Take It Back	Nominated
2009	CD of the Year	Take It Back	Nominated
2009	Special Event CD of the Year	Encore: The Best of the Clark Sisters	Won
2010	Special Event CD of the Year	Silky Soul Music... An All-Star Tribute to Maze (with Kierra Sheard and J. Moss)	Won
2013	Albertina Walker Female Vocalist of the Year	I Survived	Nominated
2013	Contemporary Female of the Year	I Survived	Nominated
2013	Contemporary CD of the Year	I Survived	Nominated
2016	Traditional Female Vocalist of the Year	Living It	Nominated
2016	Albertina Walker Female Vocalist of the Year	Living It	Nominated
2016	Song of the Year	Bless This House	Nominated
2020	James Cleveland Lifetime Achievement Award	The Clark Sisters	Honored
2021	Contemporary Duo/Group Chorus of the Year	The Return	Won
2021	Duo/Group Chorus of the Year	The Return	Nominated
2021	Traditional Duo/Group Chorus of the Year	Gospel According to PJ	Won
2021	Special Event CD of the Year	The First Ladies of Gospel: The Clark Sisters Biopic Soundtrack	Won
2025	Traditional Artist of the Year	Determined	Won
2025	Traditional Album of the Year	Determined	Won
2025	Albertina Walker Female Artist of the Year	Determined	Nominated
2025	Traditional Female Artist of the Year	Determined	Nominated
2026	Contemporary Duo/Chorus Group of the Year	"Jesus I Do" (with Mariah Carey)	Nominated

=== Miscellaneous honors ===
Year	Organization	Award	Nominated work	Result
1999	Michigan's International Gospel Music Hall of Fame		The Clark Sisters	Inducted
2019	Essence Fest's Strength Of A Woman Brunch	Strength of A Woman Award	The Clark Sisters	Honored
2022	Black Music & Entertainment Walk of Fame		The Clark Sisters	Inducted
2025	Missouri Gospel Music Hall of Fame		The Clark Sisters	Inducted
2026	Hollywood Walk of Fame		The Clark Sisters	Inducted
