= Dorinda Clark-Cole (album) =

Live album by Dorinda Clark-Cole
- Released: June 11, 2002
- Venue: New Birth Cathedral
- Genre: Gospel
- Label: Gospocentric

Dorinda Clark-Cole chronology
Dorinda Clark-Cole (2002)	Live From Houston: The Rose of Gospel (2005)

Professional ratings
Review scores
Source	Rating
Allmusic	3/5 stars
Christianity Today	3.5/5 stars
Cross Rhythms	9/10 stars

Dorinda Clark-Cole is the debut solo album of Gospel singer Dorinda Clark-Cole, which was released on June 25, 2002.

Dorinda won two Stellar Awards and a Soul Train Lady of Soul Award for Best Female Gospel Artist from the album.

A DVD was later released entitled Dorinda Clark-Cole Live. The DVD is a live recording that was recorded at New Birth Cathedral in Atlanta. The track listing of the DVD includes most of the songs on the original studio album.

== Track listing ==
1. If It Had Not Been for the Lord* − 3:51
2. No Not One (feat. J. Moss) − 4:18
3. I'm Coming Out* − 5:46
4. I'm Coming Out (Reprise)* − 2:17
5. You Can't Take My Joy* − 5:45
6. Show Me the Way (feat. The Clark Sisters)* − 4:12
7. You Can't Hurry God* − 5:41
8. It's Not Me − 3:24
9. I'm Still Here* − 5:52
10. Nobody Like Jesus* − 5:09
11. You Don't Have to Leave Here* − 5:41
12. You Don't Have to Leave Here (Reprise)* − 2:41
13. You Can − 3:57
14. You Need Him (bonus track) − 4:00

Songs with stars were recorded live at the Bailey Cathedral in Detroit, Michigan.

== Chart history ==
Chart (2002)	Peak position
U.S. Billboard Gospel	5
