= Douglas Miller (musician) =

American gospel musician (1949–2021)

- Born: Douglas Lee Miller; December 31, 1949; Johnstown, Pennsylvania
- Origin: Akron, Ohio
- Died: February 5, 2021 (aged 71)
- Genres: Gospel, traditional black gospel, urban contemporary gospel, jazz, neo-bop
- Occupations: Singer, songwriter
- Instruments: Vocals, singer-songwriter
- Years active: 1984–2021
- Labels: A&M, Light, Word, Atlanta International, Rejoice Music

Douglas Lee Miller (December 31, 1949 – February 5, 2021) was an American gospel musician. He started his music career, in 1984, with the release of, I Still Love the Name Jesus, that was released by Atlanta International Records. This album along with five others placed on exclusively the Billboard magazine Gospel Albums chart. He released albums with A&M Records, Light Records, Word Records, Atlanta International Records, and Rejoice Music Group.

== Early life and education ==
Miller was born on December 31, 1949, in Johnstown, Pennsylvania as Douglas Lee Miller, and was reared in the church singing in the choir. He went to the University of Akron, and while there at the college, Mattie Moss Clark trained him how to hone his craft, and presented him at Midnight Musicals put on by The Church of God in Christ. He became known for his baritone timbre.

== Career ==
He started his recording music career in 1984, with the release of I Still Love the Name of Jesus by Atlanta International Records, and it placed at No. 5 on the Billboard magazine Gospel Albums chart. He would place five more albums upon that chart, with 1985's Unspeakable Joy at No. 6, while 1985's Redeeming Love peaked at No. 22, the next 1988's Sing until Morning went to No. 14 as did 1993's Victory, and 1990s Living at the Top got to No. 15.

== Death ==
Miller died in 2021.

== Discography ==
List of studio albums, with selected chart positions
Title	Album details	Peak chart positions
Title	Album details	US Gos
I Still Love The Name Jesus	Released: 1984; Label: Atlanta International; CD, digital download	5
Unspeakable Joy	Released: 1985; Label: Light; CD, digital download	6
Redeeming Love	Released: 1985; Label: Atlanta International; CD, digital download	22
Sing until Morning	Released: 1988; Label: Rejoice Music; CD, digital download	14
Living at the Top	Released: 1990; Label: Word; CD, digital download	15
Victory	Released: 1993; Label: A&M; CD, digital download	14
