= He Gave Me Nothing to Lose =

Studio album by The Clark Sisters
- Released: 1979
- Recorded: 1979
- Genre: Gospel
- Label: Sound Of Gospel

The Clark Sisters chronology
Count It All Joy (1978)	He Gave Me Nothing to Lose (1979)	Is My Living In Vain (1980)

He Gave Me Nothing to Lose is a 1979 album by The Clark Sisters. It was recorded in 1978 through 1979. Although only four members appear on the cover, Denise Clark Bradford still was included in the album. The album reached number 18 on the Billboard Top Gospel Albums chart.

== Track listing ==
1. "My Life Is Complete With Jesus" soloist Twinkie and Karen Clark
2. "My Cup Runneth Over" soloist Mattie Moss Clark
3. "God Understands All" soloist Jacky Clark
4. "Nothing to Lose" soloist Twinkie Clark
5. "Everything's Gonna Be Alright" soloist Twinkie Clark
6. "Only Believe" soloist Karen Clark
7. "Determination" soloist Dorinda Clark

=== Outtakes ===
1. "My God Loves Me" soloist Denise Clark
2. "Psalms 1" soloist Dorinda Clark
3. "Take Me Back" soloist Twinkie Clark
4. "Lead Me" soloist Denise Clark

== Charts ==
Chart (1980)	Peak position
US Top Gospel Albums (Billboard)	18
