= Twinkie Clark =

American gospel singer and songwriter (born 1954)

- Also known as: Twinkie Clark-Terrell; Queen of the B3 Hammond Organ
- Born: Elbernita Clark; November 15, 1954 (age 71); Detroit, Michigan, U.S.
- Origin: Detroit, Michigan
- Genres: Gospel
- Occupations: Singer; songwriter; producer; arranger; organist; pianist
- Instruments: Vocals; organ; piano
- Years active: 1966–present
- Labels: Sound of Gospel; Tyscot; Crystal Rose; Tribute; Verity; EMI Gospel
- Member of: The Clark Sisters
- Website: theclarksisters.net

Elbernita "Twinkie" Clark (born November 15, 1954) is an American singer, songwriter, composer, arranger, organist, record producer, and evangelist. Often called the "Mother of Contemporary Gospel Music", she is best known as the chief songwriter and a member of the gospel group the Clark Sisters, who received a Grammy Lifetime Achievement Award in 2024. Clark possesses a 4-octave vocal range, spanning from bass/baritone (G2) to high soprano and whistle register (Bb6), and was named one of NPR's 50 Great Voices.

Renowned for her mastery of the Hammond Organ, she is credited as the originator of the contemporary "COGIC Shout Sound." in gospel music. Clark is frequently referred to as the "Queen of the B3 Hammond Organ", and was inducted into the Hammond Hall of Fame in 2014. Artists such as Beyonce, Whitney Houston, Faith Evans, Mary J. Blige, Mariah Carey, Jazmine Sullivan, Kim Burrell, and Clark's sister, Karen Clark Sheard, have cited Clark as a significant influence on their vocal style and have sampled her songs on several different projects of their own.

== Biography ==
=== Early life ===
Born to Mattie Moss Clark and Pastor Elbert Clark in Detroit, Michigan, Clark began her tutelage in music under the direction of her mother, very early in life. From the age of 13, she began touring nationally with her mother, ministering and training choirs in three-part vocal harmony. In 1967, she made her recording debut as a featured vocalist alongside her mother, sister Denise Clark, and Dolores Jones on the Southwest Michigan State Choir of the Church Of God in Christ's "He Will Supply Your Need", from the album A Closer Walk with Thee. Clark later received formal music education at Howard University in Washington, D.C.

=== The Clark Sisters ===
Since their formation in 1973, Clark has been the leader, principal songwriter, and producer of the gospel group the Clark Sisters, which includes sisters Jacky Clark Chisholm, Dorinda Clark Cole, and Karen Clark Sheard (sister Denise Clark Bradford departed the group in 1986). The group achieved their biggest success with the mainstream, crossover hit "You Brought the Sunshine (Into My Life)" in 1983, which peaked within the top 20 of Billboard's Gospel and Hot R&B/Hip-Hop Songs charts and hit a top 30 peak on the Hot Dance Club Play chart. Other hit songs include, "Is My Living in Vain", "Expect Your Miracle" and "Jesus is a Love Song", all written by Clark. Receiving their first Grammy nomination at the 26th Annual Grammy Awards for Sincerely (1982) in the Best Soul Gospel Performance by a Duo or Group category, they received subsequent nominations for their follow-ups, Heart & Soul (1986) and Conqueror (1988), for Best Soul Gospel Performance by a Duo, Group, Choir or Chorus at the 30th and 31st Annual Grammy Awards. In 1990, the group received its first Grammy nomination for a live album when Bringing it Back Home (1989) was nominated for Best Traditional Soul Gospel Album at the 33rd Annual Grammy Awards. In 2007, the Clark Sisters were awarded three Grammys at the 50th Annual Grammy Awards: Best Gospel Song and Best Gospel Performance for "Blessed & Highly Favored" and Best Traditional Gospel Album for its parent album Live: One Last Time, which topped both the Billboard Gospel Albums and Christian Music Video charts.

In 2016, the group was honored at the Essence festival. In 2020, it was announced that the Clark Sisters would be honored with the James Cleveland Lifetime Achievement Award at the 35th Annual Stellar Awards. The same year, a Lifetime biographical film, The Clark Sisters: First Ladies of Gospel was released, produced by Queen Latifah, Mary J. Blige, and Missy Elliott, and became the highest rated original movie release by Lifetime in four years.

=== Solo career ===
Clark has recorded several solo albums. Her debut studio album, Praise Belongs to God (1979), was ranked at No. 28 by Billboard on the 1981 year-end Spiritual Albums chart and followed shortly by Ye Shall Receive Power (1981). In 1992, she released Comin' Home and The Masterpiece in 1996. Also in 1996, she made her live solo debut in a collaborative album Twinkie Clark-Terrell Presents the Florida A&M University Gospel Choir, which was a top 10 hit on the Billboard Gospel Albums chart, where it was placed by Billboard as the 34th Top Gospel Album of 1996. In 2002, she released Twinkie Clark & Friends...Live in Charlotte which received a Grammy nomination for Best Traditional Soul Gospel Album. In 2004, it was followed by the Asaph Ward-produced Home Once Again: Live in Detroit, which became her highest-charting album on Billboard's Gospel Albums chart and also appeared on the Top R&B/Hip-Hop Albums chart. In 2011 and 2013, Clark released With Humility and Live & Unplugged respectively on Larry Clark Gospel, before releasing a collaborative album with Larry Clark (the son of her sister Denise Clark Bradford), The Generations in 2020.

=== Musical influence ===
Clark has been inspired by different genres of music, including jazz, reggae, classical, funk, and blues, and she lists artists such as Stevie Wonder, Thomas Whitfield, Walter Hawkins, Edwin Hawkins, Andraé Crouch, Charles Nicks, Aretha Franklin, and her mother, Mattie Moss Clark, as musical influences.

=== Legacy ===
Artists such as Beyoncé, Whitney Houston, Mariah Carey, Mary J. Blige, Faith Evans and also her sister, Karen Clark-Sheard have cited Clark as a major influence on their singing and vocal style and have also sampled her music in various songs of their own.

Clark is principally credited as the originator of "The C.O.G.I.C. Shout Sound". She is a BMI Gospel Trailblazer honoree and the recipient of multiple Grammy Awards, including a Lifetime Achievement Award. She is the recipient of an honorary doctorate of sacred music from the Christian Bible Institute and Seminary (CBIS).

== Discography ==
=== Studio albums ===
List of albums, with selected chart positions, sales figures and certifications
Title	Album details	Peak chart positions
Title	Album details	US Gospel
Praise Belongs to God	Released: 1979; Label: Sound of Gospel (#SOG 091); Formats: LP	15
Ye Shall Receive Power	Released: 1981; Label: Sound of Gospel (#SOG 133); Formats: LP	—
Comin' Home	Released: January 15, 1992; Label: Tyscot Records (#GRA30012D); Formats: CD, cassette, digital download	40
The Masterpiece	Released: April 1, 1996; Label: Tribute Records, Zomba (#7901139226); Formats: CD, cassette, digital download	19
With Humility	Released: April 5, 2011; Label: Larry Clark Gospel; Formats: CD, digital download	14
The Generations (with Larry Clark)	Released: February 14, 2020; Label: Larry Clark Gospel; Formats: Digital download	—
Donald Lawrence Presents Power: A Tribute to Twinkie Clark (with Donald Lawrence & Co.)	Released: September 15, 2023; Label: Provident; Formats: Digital download	—

=== EPs ===
List of albums, with selected chart positions, sales figures and certifications
Title	Album details	Peak chart positions
Title	Album details	US Gospel
Maestra	Released: January 20, 2023; Label: Le Chateau Earl Records; Formats: Digital download, Streaming	—

=== Live albums ===
List of albums, with selected chart positions, sales figures and certifications
Title	Album details	Peak chart positions	
Title	Album details	US Gospel	US R&B/ HH
Twinkie Clark-Terrell Presents The Florida A&M University Gospel Choir	Released: June 13, 1996; Label: Crystal Rose Records, Star Song Communications (#SSD 0127); Formats: CD, VHS, cassette, digital download	10	—
Twinkie Clark & Friends...Live in Charlotte	Released: August 20, 2002; Label: Verity Records (#01241-43196-2); Formats: CD, cassette, DVD, digital download	10	—
Home Once Again...Live in Detroit	Released: August 10, 2004; Label: Verity Records (#82876-62293-2); Formats: CD, digital download	9	66
Live & Unplugged	Released: August 27, 2013; Label: Larry Clark Gospel; Formats: CD, DVD, digital download	16	—

=== Compilation albums ===
List of albums, with selected chart positions, sales figures and certifications
Title	Album details	Peak chart positions
Title	Album details	US Gospel
Praise Belongs to God / Ye Shall Receive	Released: March 8, 2005; Label: Sound of Gospel (#SOG 2CD-3004); Formats: CD, digital download	—
Praise & Worship	Released: June 12, 2006; Label: Verity Records, Legacy Records (#01241-43196-2); Formats: CD, digital download	39
You Brought the Sunshine (The Sound of Gospel Recordings 1976–1981) (with The Clark Sisters)	Released: January 31, 2020; Labels: Westbound Records (#CDSEWD 159); Formats: CD, digital download	—

=== Singles ===
as a lead artist

List of singles, with selected chart positions and certifications, showing year released and album name
Title	Year	Peak chart positions	Album
Title	Year	US Gospel	Album
"He Lifted Me"	2005	14	Home Once Again...Live in Detroit
"When Praises Go Up"	2010	—	non-album single
"God's Got a Blessing"	2010	—	With Humility
"Awesome God" (featuring Larry Clark)	2010	—	With Humility
"God Gave Me Favor"	2013	17	Live & Unplugged
"Speak Lord" (featuring Karen Clark-Sheard)	2013	—	Live & Unplugged
"There is a Word" (featuring Larry Clark)	2014	— (Note: "There is a Word" did not enter Billboard Hot Gospel Songs, but peaked at number 20 on the Billboard Gospel Airplay chart.)	Live & Unplugged
"In My Spirit" (with Larry Clark)	2020	—	The Generations
"In Him There Is No Sorrow" (with Donald Lawrence & Co. and Yolanda Adams)	2023	17	Donald Lawrence Presents Power: A Tribute to Twinkie Clark

as a featured artist

List of singles, with selected chart positions and certifications, showing year released and album name
Title	Year	Peak chart positions	Album
Title	Year	US Gospel	Album
"I Gotta Feelin'" (Eric Deon featuring Twinkie Clark)	2013	—	non-album single
"I Thank God for Jesus" (Anthony "Junebug" Turner & the Norfolk State University Voices of Inspiration Gospel Choir featuring Twinkie Clark)	2014	—	non-album single
"Everything's Gonna Be Alright" (The First Cathedral Mass Choir featuring Moses Tyson Jr., Twinkie Clark)	2014	—	The First Cathedral Gospel Music Extravaganza, Vol. 1

=== Album appearances ===
List of album appearances, showing year released and album name
Title	Year	Album
"He Will Supply Your Need" (Southwest Michigan State Choir of the Church of God in Christ featuring Mattie Moss Clark, Denise Clark, Dolores Jones, Twinkie Clark)	1967	A Closer Walk with Thee
"My Faith Holds Out Til He Comes" (Mattie Moss Clark & the Michigan State Community Choir featuring Elbernita Clark)	1972	That's Christ
"Trust in Him (He'll Bring You Out)" (Sister Mattie Moss Clark and the South Michigan State Community Choir featuring Twinkie Clark)	1973	The Hands of God Reached Out and Touched Me
"I Want To Be More Like Jesus"" (Mattie Moss Clark featuring Twinkie Clark, Dorinda Clark)	1973	A Song Is Born Vol. 1
"Oh Give Thanks" (Mattie Moss Clark featuring Ora Watkins, Twinkie Clark)	1974	I Don't Know What I Would Do Without the Lord
"Lord I Want to Be Ready" (Mattie Moss Clark featuring Twinkie Clark)	1974	I Don't Know What I Would Do Without the Lord
"The Wages Of Sin Is Death"" (Mattie Moss Clark & the Michigan State Community Choir featuring Twinkie Clark)	1975	The Wages of Sin Is Death
"He Was Hung Up for My Hang Ups" (Mattie Moss Clark featuring Ora Watkins, Twinkie Clark)	1976	He Was Hung-Up for My Hang-Ups
"If My People Which Are Called by My Name" (Mattie Moss Clark featuring Twinkie Clark, Karen Clark)	1976	He Was Hung-Up for My Hang-Ups
"That Shall He Also Reap" (Mattie Moss Clark & the Michigan State Community Choir featuring Elbernita Clark)	1978	I Am Crucified with Christ
"O, Saint of God" (UNAC 5 featuring Elbernita Clark)	1979	Volume Three
"The Wonderful Change" (Missionary Essie Moss featuring Twinkie Clark, Maria Gardner)	1980	Take One Day at a Time
"Running for the Lord" (Missionary Essie Moss featuring Twinkie Clark, Maria Gardner)	1980	Take One Day at a Time
"I Can Do All things" (COGIC International Mass Choir featuring Elbernita "Twinkie" Clark)	1980	I Can Do All Things
"Hallelujah" (COGIC International Mass Choir featuring Elbernita "Twinkie" Clark)	1980	I Can Do All Things
"I've Never Seen The Righteous Forsaken" (Mattie Moss Clark presents the Church Of God in Christ International Choir featuring Elbernita Clark)	1986	A Song Is Born UNAC 5 Houston 1986
"The Anointing Breaks The Yoke" (Mattie Moss Clark presents the Church Of God in Christ International Choir featuring Elbernita Clark)	1986	A Song Is Born UNAC 5 Houston 1986
"For Your Service, Lord" (Dr. Mattie Moss Clark featuring Twinkie Clark-Terrell)	1989	The Southern California Holy Gospel Feast
"Lift Those Hands and Bless Him" (Thomas Whitfield featuring Twinkie Clark-Terrell, Larry Whitfield)	1993	A Tribute to "The Maestro"
"More Like Thee" (Corey Skinner's Collegiate Voices of Faith featuring Twinkie Clark-Terrell, Mattie Moss Clark, Veronica Fly)	1993	Dr. Mattie Moss Clark Presents Corey Skinner's Collegiate Voices of Faith
"I Found Jesus" (Corey Skinner's Collegiate Voices of Faith featuring Twinkie Clark-Terrell, Mattie Moss Clark)	1993	Dr. Mattie Moss Clark Presents Corey Skinner's Collegiate Voices of Faith
"Be Strong in the Lord" (Dr. Mattie Moss Clark presents the C.O.G.I.C. National Music Choir featuring A. Lyle, Aljarita Stewart, Twinkie Clark-Terrell)	1994	Live in Atlanta
"Trust in the Lord" (Dr. Mattie Moss Clark presents the C.O.G.I.C. National Music Choir featuring Twinkie Clark-Terrell)	1994	Live in Atlanta
"Watch Ye Therefore" (Mattie Moss Clark & The Michigan State Mass Choir featuring Twinkie Clark-Terrell)	1994	Watch Ye Therefore
"Hold On" (Michael Scott & the Outreach Choir featuring Gerald Rivera, Twinkie Clark-Terrell)	1995	Hold On
"Trust in Jesus" (Michael Scott & the Outreach Choir featuring Shavonne Edwards, Twinkie Clark-Terrell)	1995	Hold On
"The Praise" (Rodney Posey with the Whitfield Company featuring Twinkie Clark-Terrell)	1995	Live in Praise And Worship with the Whitfield Company
"Lord, Let Me Hear from Heaven" (Michael Scott & the Outreach Choir featuring Mattie Moss Clark, Twinkie Clark-Terrell)	1996	Lord, Let Me Hear from Heaven
"Oh Come All Ye Faithful" (Twinkie Clark-Terrell)	1998	The Real Meaning of Christmas, Vol. 2
"Secret Place" (Robert Lowe & Generations featuring Twinkie Clark)	2000	Total Experience
"Joy Unspeakable" (Derrick Starks & Today's Generation featuring Twinkie Clark-Terrell)	2001	Sacrifice
"Children Go Where I Send Thee" (Michael McDonald featuring Twinkie Clark)	2001	In the Spirit: A Christmas Album
"Timmy's Choir" (Timmy Vegas featuring Twinkie Clark)	2009	Motivation Too
"Thank You" (Dorinda Clark-Cole featuring Twinkie Clark)	2011	I Survived
"Coming Out" (Titus Jackson featuring Twinkie Clark)	2015	Changed
"God's Got a Blessing" (Larry Clark featuring Twinkie Clark)	2016	Hallelujah
"There Is a Word" (Larry Clark featuring Twinkie Clark)	2016	Hallelujah
"Sing & Shout" (Larry Clark featuring Twinkie Clark)	2016	Hallelujah
"God Gave Me Favor" (Larry Clark featuring Twinkie Clark)	2016	Hallelujah
"Awesome God" (Larry Clark featuring Twinkie Clark)	2016	Hallelujah
"The Anointing Breaks the Yoke" (Larry Clark featuring Twinkie Clark)	2016	Hallelujah
"Praise Break" (Larry Clark featuring Twinkie & the Clark Sisters)	2016	Hallelujah
"I'm Delivered" (G E I featuring Elbernita "Twinkie" Clark)	2016	GEI Live

== Awards ==
=== BET Awards ===
The BET Awards are awarded annually by the Black Entertainment Television network. Clark has received two nominations.

Year	Award	Nominated work	Result
2008	Best Gospel Artist	The Clark Sisters	Nominated
2020	Dr. Bobby Jones Best Gospel/Inspirational Award	"Victory"	Nominated

=== BMI Trailblazers of Gospel Music Awards ===
The BMI Trailblazers of Gospel Music Awards are awarded annually. Clark has been recognized three times.

Year	Award	Nominated work	Result
2009	Trailblazer of Gospel Music	Herself	Honored
2022	One of the Most-Performed Songs of the Year	"His Love"	Recognized
2025	One of the Most-Performed Songs of the Year	"In Him There Is No Sorrow"	Recognized

=== Dove Awards ===
The Dove Awards are awarded annually by the Gospel Music Association. Clark has won 2 awards from 11 nominations.

Year	Award	Nominated work	Result
1983	Inspirational Black Gospel Album of the Year	Sincerely	Nominated
1987	Contemporary Gospel Album of the Year	Heart & Soul	Won
2003	Traditional Gospel Recorded Song of the Year	"Endow Me"	Nominated
2008	Artist of the Year	The Clark Sisters	Nominated
2008	Group of the Year	The Clark Sisters	Nominated
2008	Contemporary Gospel Recorded Song of the Year	"Blessed and Highly Favored"	Nominated
2008	Contemporary Gospel Album of the Year	Live – One Last Time	Nominated
2020	Traditional Gospel Recorded Song of the Year	"Victory"	Nominated
2020	Inspirational Film of the Year	The Clark Sisters: First Ladies of Gospel	Nominated
2020	Traditional Gospel Album of the Year	The Return	Won
2026	Contemporary Gospel Recorded Song of the Year	"Jesus I Do" (with Mariah Carey)	Pending

=== Grammy Awards ===
The Grammy Awards are awarded annually by the National Academy of Recording Arts and Sciences. Clark has won 3 awards from 8 nominations, including a Lifetime Achievement award.

Year	Award	Nominated work	Result
1983	Best Soul Gospel Performance by a Duo or Group	Sincerely	Nominated
1987	Best Soul Gospel Performance by a Duo or Group, Choir or Chorus	Heart & Soul	Nominated
1988	Best Soul Gospel Performance by a Duo or Group, Choir or Chorus	Conqueror	Nominated
1990	Best Traditional Soul Gospel Album	Bringing it Back Home	Nominated
2002	Best Traditional Soul Gospel Album	Live In Charlotte	Nominated
2007	Best Gospel Performance	"Blessed & Highly Favored"	Won
2007	Best Traditional Gospel Album	Live: One Last Time	Won
2009	Best R&B Performance by a Duo or Group with Vocals	"Higher Ground"	Nominated
2024	Grammy Lifetime Achievement Award	The Clark Sisters	Honored

=== NAACP Image Awards ===
The NAACP Image Awards are awarded annually by the National Association for the Advancement of Colored People (NAACP). Clark has won two awards from four nominations.

Year	Award	Nominated work	Result
1983	Outstanding Gospel Artist	The Clark Sisters	Won
1989	Outstanding Gospel Artist	The Clark Sisters	Nominated
2020	Outstanding Gospel/Christian Song – Traditional or Contemporary	"Victory"	Nominated
2021	Outstanding Gospel/Christian Album	The Return	Won

=== Soul Train Awards ===
The Soul Train Music Awards are awarded annually. Clark has received three nominations.

Year	Award	Nominated work	Result
1988	Best Gospel Album – Group or Choir	Heart & Soul	Nominated
1989	Best Gospel Album	Conqueror	Nominated
2020	Best Gospel/Inspirational Award	The Clark Sisters	Nominated

=== Stellar Awards ===
The Stellar Awards are awarded annually by SAGMA. Clark has received 8 awards and 2 honorary awards.

Year	Award	Nominated work	Result
2004	Traditional Female Vocalist of the Year	Live In Charlotte	Nominated
2004	Traditional CD of the Year	Live In Charlotte	Nominated
2006	Female Vocalist of the Year	Home Once Again: Live in Detroit	Nominated
2007	The Chevrolet Most Notable Achievement Award	The Clark Sisters	Honored
2008	CD of the Year	Live... One Last Time	Won
2008	Artist of the Year	Live... One Last Time	Won
2008	Group or Duo of the Year	Live... One Last Time	Won
2008	Traditional Group/Duo of the Year	Live... One Last Time	Won
2009	Special Event CD of the Year	Encore: The Best of the Clark Sisters	Won
2010	Special Event CD of the Year	Silky Soul Music... An All-Star Tribute to Maze (with Kierra Sheard and J. Moss)	Won
2012	Traditional Female Vocalist of the Year	Twinkie Clark	Nominated
2014	Special Event CD of the Year	Twinkie Clark Live & Unplugged	Nominated
2014	Albertina Walker Female Vocalist of the Year	Twinkie Clark Live & Unplugged	Nominated
2014	Traditional Female Vocalist of the Year	Twinkie Clark Live & Unplugged	Nominated
2020	James Cleveland Lifetime Achievement Award	The Clark Sisters	Honored
2021	Contemporary Duo/Group Chorus of the Year	The Return	Won
2021	Duo/Group Chorus of the Year	The Return	Nominated
2021	Traditional Duo/Group Chorus of the Year	Gospel According to PJ	Won
2026	Contemporary Duo/Chorus Group of the Year	"Jesus I Do" (with Mariah Carey)	Nominated

=== Miscellaneous honors ===
Year	Organization	Award	Nominated work	Result
1999	Michigan's International Gospel Music Hall of Fame		The Clark Sisters	Inducted
2010	NPR	50 Great Voices	Herself	Selected
2014	Hammond Organ Hall of Fame		Herself	Inducted
2019	Essence Fest's Strength Of A Woman Brunch	Strength of A Woman Award	The Clark Sisters	Honored
2022	Black Music & Entertainment Walk of Fame		The Clark Sisters	Inducted
2025	Missouri Gospel Music Hall of Fame		The Clark Sisters	Inducted
2026	Hollywood Walk of Fame		The Clark Sisters	Inducted
