= Psiryn =

American R&B girl group

- Genre: R&B
- Years active: 2024–present
- Label: Kandi Koated Entertainment
- Members: Jada Denise; Victoria McQueen
- Past members: Anaya Chayenne

Psiryn (pronounced “Siren”) is an American R&B girl group. Consisting of members Anaya Chayenne, Jada Denise, and Victoria McQueen, it was founded in 2024 by Xscape member Kandi Burruss and releases music through Kandi Koated Entertainment. BET called them one of five modern Black girl groups "that we're rooting for in 2025."

== Career ==
Kandi Burruss found Anaya, Jada, and Victoria on social media where the trio covered songs like "Sweet Love" by Anita Baker, after which Kandi Burruss, and Nick Cannon, sought to make the trio into a more developed musical act which would then become Psiryn. In 2024, they served as the opening act to the Queens of R&B Tour.

In September 2024, Psiryn debuted their single "Sober" and landed on several charts. In February 2025, the single hit number one on the Adult R&B Airplay chart, marking the first all-women duo or group to do so in over two decades; R&B duo Floetry had last reached number one on the same chart in 2003.

In April 2025, Psiryn released "The Softest", a single and modern take on Xscape's "Softest Place on Earth", with Kandi Burruss herself featuring on the track.

In June 2025, Psiryn released their debut EP, In The Key Of Us. It features six tracks, including "Sober" and "The Softest".

In August 2025, Kandi confirmed in an interview that a member (later confirmed to be Anaya), left the group.

In July 2026, Kandi announced that Jada Denise would continue with Kandi as a solo artist working with Christian Ward (Hitmaka).
