= Urban contemporary gospel =

Gospel music genre

Urban/contemporary gospel
- Stylistic origins: Traditional black gospel; urban contemporary; contemporary Christian music
- Cultural origins: Late 20th century, African-Americans
- Typical instruments: Guitar; bass; drums; piano

Subgenres
- Christian hip-hop

Urban/contemporary gospel, also known as urban gospel music, urban gospel pop, or just simply urban gospel, is a modern subgenre of gospel music. Although the style developed gradually, early forms are generally dated to the 1970s, and the genre was well established by the end of the 1980s. The radio format is pitched primarily to African-Americans. Christian hip-hop can be considered a subtype of this genre.

== Origins and development ==
Protestant hymns and African-American spirituals make up the basic source material for traditional black gospel music, which in turn is the most significant source of urban/contemporary gospel. Urban/contemporary gospel has kept the spiritual focus of the traditional black gospel music, but uses modern musical forms.

Urban/contemporary gospel derives primarily from traditional black gospel music, with strong influence from, and strong influence on, many forms of secular pop music. Due to strong racial divisions in 20th century American culture, urban/contemporary gospel developed specifically out of the African-American musical traditions. The equivalent music from white American culture is contemporary Christian music. Although the racial lines have blurred in some areas, particularly with urban musical styles, these divisions are still evident in the industry. The color line divides artists with extremely similar musical styles on the basis of their race, and unites artists with divergent styles (such as rap and pop) on the same basis in industry reporting, marketing choices, and awards like the Grammy and Dove awards.

=== 1960s–1970s ===
During the 1960s and 1970s and 1980s, hit songs like The Clark Sisters' "You Brought the Sunshine" Edwin Hawkins' "Oh Happy Day" and Andrae Crouch's "Take Me Back" were significant milestones in the development of urban/contemporary gospel music. Edwin Hawkins is called the "godfather of contemporary gospel" and Twinkie Clark is called the "Mother Of Contemporary Gospel".

=== 1980s–1990s ===
In the 1980s and 1990s, some gospel groups (such as The Rance Allen Group) emerged by singing with elements of Motown sound, emulating quartets such as The Temptations but still propagating biblical messages. The members of many such groups later established their own gospel music careers (but still returned for occasional reunions). For example, Marvin Sapp and Fred Hammond started out in the group Commissioned. New artists like Yolanda Adams, the Clark Sisters, Donnie McClurkin, and Kirk Franklin's Nu Nation gained popularity in the secular world with their musical style.

Other groups and individual artists such as Hezekiah Walker took gospel congregational songs from the 1950s and 1960s and adapted them to a more upbeat feel similar to '80s and '90s pop. Examples of this include "99 ½" by Walker and the Love Fellowship Crusade Choir.

Many artists who began in the 1960s and 1970s (like the aforementioned Andrae Crouch and The Clark Sisters) also continued to release influential songs and albums in this period.

=== 2000s–2010s ===
In the 2000s, many gospel artists from the previous two decades began establishing records and gaining established places in the gospel music canon, as recognized by annual WOW Gospel albums (after beginning in the late 1990s). They were accompanied by younger gospel artists/groups like Mary Mary, Sheri Jones-Moffett and Brian Courtney Wilson, who leaned the genre towards hip-hop, funk and '90s R&B, respectively.

Groups like Tye Tribbett & G.A. and Myron Butler and his group Levi released songs with more complicated instrumental riffs and melodies that hint at a contemporary jazz influence (though some say it goes the other way around).

Gospel artists had collaborated with secular artists in the past, but in the 2000s and 2010s, this became far more pronounced. Kirk Franklin is widely known for this, working with Kanye West on his gospel album, Jesus Is King, and with Lil Baby on the song "We Win" for the movie Space Jam: A New Legacy. Franklin also sang with Stevie Wonder on "Why" in the former's 2005 album, Hero. Rance Allen sung with Snoop Dogg on the song "Blessing Me Again" in 2018.

Eventually, secular artists began releasing gospel albums full of such collaborations. Examples include PJ Morton's 2020 album Gospel According to PJ and Snoop Dogg's 2018 album Bible of Love.

== Criticism ==
Like most forms of Christian music in the last two centuries, artists have been criticized by Christians who see the new forms as too similar to secular music styles or insufficiently focused on traditional religious sentiments. Artists in the urban/contemporary styles have taken a variety of approaches to address these concerns from their fan bases.

Artists in this genre are expected to convey a committed Christian religious viewpoint and to treat their musical performances as a sacred service to God. In a distinctly Protestant-American touch, artists in this genre are expected to pray publicly, to "testify" about the artist's personal, emotion-driven conversion, and to make an effort to convert non-Christians to Christianity.

== Style ==
The secular version of this music is urban contemporary music, which is musically indistinguishable, but which takes non-religious subjects for its lyrical content. Urban/contemporary gospel music is characterized by dominant vocals, usually performed by a soloist. Common instruments include drums, electric guitar, bass guitar, and keyboards.

The lyrics very often have an explicitly Christian nature, although "inspirational" songs feature lyrics that can be construed as secular in meaning. For example, a song about a father's love for his son may be interpreted as God the Father's love for God the Son, or as a human father's love for his human child. This lyrical ambiguity echoes the double-voicedness of 19th century spirituals, and may have musical crossover appeal to the larger secular market. Common themes include hope, deliverance, love, and healing.

In comparison with traditional hymns, which are generally of a statelier measure, gospel songs are expected to have a refrain and a pronounced beat with a syncopated rhythm. Compared to modern praise and worship music, urban/contemporary gospel typically has a faster tempo and more emphasis on the performer.

The genre includes Christian hip-hop (sometimes called "Christian rap"), which has lyrics with Christian ideals and themes.

== Influences ==
Rock & roll, country and rhythm & blues were influenced by traditional black gospel music, and these forms, as well as disco, funk, jazz and many secular genres, influenced urban/contemporary gospel music.

Perhaps the most significant musical influences on urban/contemporary gospel are hip-hop and R&B. Like contemporary gospel, R&B developed from traditional black gospel music. Soul music and Christian rock are also significant influences on contemporary gospel.

== Sales and marketing ==
The gospel market is smaller than the secular market, but popular artists have sold millions of units. The radio stations that program UC Gospel, primarily in the Southern and Southeastern US serve listeners from all age groups and income demographics in the African-American communities.

Compared to traditional black music, whose sales are steady, urban/contemporary sales are rising, as a result of more significant marketing efforts.

== Labels ==
- GospoCentric
- Verity Records

== See also ==
- List of gospel musicians
- Category:Urban contemporary gospel musicians
- Christian R&B
- Soul music
- Gospel Music Hall of Fame
- Stellar Awards
- British black gospel
