= L.A. Mass Choir =

The L.A. Mass Choir is an American gospel choir from Los Angeles. The group released several commercially successful albums in the late 1980s and 1990s, and was nominated for Stellar Awards and Gospel Music Excellence Awards. It was started by Tony Wilkins and Donald Taylor. Donald Taylor directed the choir.

== Discography ==
- Live! Give Him the Glory (1988) U.S. Gospel #3
- Can't Hold Back (1989) U.S. Gospel #2
- Hell (1990)
- Come As You Are (1992) U.S. Gospel #7
- I Shall Not Be Defeated (1994) U.S. Gospel #6
- Unconditional Love (1995) U.S. Gospel #31
- Back to the Drawing Board (1998) U.S. Gospel #32
