= The Clark Sisters =

American gospel vocal group from Detroit, Michigan

- Also known as: Twinkie Clark and The Clark Sisters (1974–1980); The Dynamic Clark Sisters (1980)
- Origin: Detroit, Michigan, U.S.
- Genres: Gospel, urban contemporary gospel
- Years active: 1973–present
- Labels: Billmo, Sound Of Gospel, Westbound/Elektra, Rejoice/Word, Sparrow, EMI Gospel Karew
- Members: Jacky Clark Chisholm: Elbernita "Twinkie" Clark; Dorinda Clark Cole; Karen Clark Sheard
- Past members: Denise "Niecy" Clark-Bradford
- Website: theclarksisters.net

The Clark Sisters are an American gospel vocal group originally consisting of 5 sisters: Jacky Clark Chisholm (born 1948), Denise "Niecy" Clark-Bradford (born 1953), Elbernita "Twinkie" Clark (born 1954), Dorinda Clark-Cole (born 1957), and Karen Clark Sheard (born 1960). The Clark Sisters are the daughters of gospel musician and choral director Dr. Mattie Moss Clark. They are credited for helping to bring gospel music to the mainstream and are considered pioneers of contemporary gospel.

Their biggest hits include "Is My Living in Vain", "Name It, Claim It", "Jesus Is a Love Song", "I’ve Got An Angel", "Take Me Higher", "Praise the Lord (Hallelujah)", "A Praying Spirit", "Nothing to Lose, All to Gain", "Endow Me", "Pure Gold", "Expect Your Miracle", and their mainstream crossover hit, "You Brought the Sunshine"; which made its way to #16 on the Hot Black Singles chart in 1983, two years after its original 1981 release on the album of the same name. More recent hits include "Blessed & Highly Favored", "Livin’", "Victory", and "His Love", which features rapper Snoop Dogg.

As a group, the Clark Sisters have won four Grammy Awards and are the highest-selling female gospel group in history. In 2020, the Clark Sisters were honored with the James Cleveland Lifetime Achievement Award at the 35th Annual Stellar Awards. In 2022, the group was inducted into the Black Music & Entertainment Walk of Fame. In 2024, the group (including Denise Clark-Bradford) was honored with the Grammy Lifetime Achievement Award, becoming the fifth gospel act to receive the award, after Mahalia Jackson, The Staple Singers, The Blind Boys of Alabama, and Shirley Caesar.

== Career ==
=== Early career ===
The Clark Sisters were born and raised in Detroit, Michigan, to gospel choir director and musician Dr. Mattie Moss Clark. Dr. Clark was married twice: her first marriage in 1945 to Leo H. Cullum, Sr. produced two children, Leo, Jr. and Jacqueline (Jacky). After her divorce, she met and later married Pastor Elbert Clark in 1952. This marriage produced four daughters: Denise, Elbernita (Twinkie), Dorinda, and Karen. They each began singing at an early age in the choir at their father's Church of God in Christ, and by the late 1960s they were all performing together in church services, usually singing songs written and arranged by their mother. Shortly after the Clarks' divorce in 1973, Dr. Clark formally created "the Clark Sisters" and the sisters recorded their first album, Jesus Has a Lot to Give, on their uncle (their mother's younger brother) Bill Moss' local label Billesse Records. The first television appearance of the Clark Sisters was on TV Gospel Time.

The following year, Dr. Mattie Moss Clark Presents the Clark Sisters was released and people around Detroit began to take notice of the group. The Clark Sisters signed to Sound of Gospel Records in 1974. Under this association, the group released albums such as Unworthy, Count It All Joy, and He Gave Me Nothing to Lose, which hit the top 20 of the Billboard Spiritual LPs chart. By this point, Dr. Clark had turned over control of the group to Twinkie, who continued to write, arrange, conduct, and produce all of the Clark Sisters' recordings. Their popularity soared with the release of the live recording Is My Living in Vain, in 1980. Their debut live recording was first ranked on the 1981 Billboard Spiritual Albums year-end chart at number 21, before topping the year-end Spiritual Albums chart of 1982. Opening with the bluesy title track, each sister vocally declares that their dedication to Christ is not a useless effort. The innovative "Ha-Ya (Eternal Life)" was funky enough to find its way into a Tonex-produced track over two decades later. Karen Clark's lead on "Speak Lord" expresses deep faith while the call to worship is raised on "Now Is the Time". Another hit from this release, "Expect Your Miracle", is still a staple in African American churches across the country.

=== Mainstream success (1981–1984) ===
Their next release, You Brought the Sunshine (1981), became successful due to its title track. Reminiscent of Stevie Wonder's "Master Blaster (Jammin')", the song became a hit in churches and on dance floors across the country, including New York's Studio 54. "You Brought the Sunshine (Into My Life)" was picked up from its original independent gospel record label Sound of Gospel and distributed by both Westbound Records and Elektra Records. In 1983, the song peaked at number 16 on Billboard Black Singles, number 27 on Dance Club Songs and in 2020 – the Live: One Last Time (2007) recording – hit number 11 on the Hot Gospel Songs chart. The album was also a commercial success, peaking at number 9 on the US Top Gospel Albums chart and also appeared on both the 1983 and 1984 year-end charts at number two and 25 respectively. Furthermore, Billboard ranked The Clark Sisters as the number-four Top Gospel Albums Artist of 1982 and number-one Top Gospel Albums Artist of 1983.

The sisters delivered another album in 1982, Sincerely, which included "Name It, Claim It" and the politically charged "World". Though its success was overshadowed by You Brought the Sunshine, the sisters received their first Grammy Award nomination for Best Soul Gospel Performance by a Duo or Group for the album at the 26th Annual Grammy Awards. Shortly after winning the Grammy nomination, the Clark Sisters won the NAACP Image Award for best gospel group for 1983. After receiving a second Grammy nomination in the Best Soul Gospel Performance by a Duo or Group category for the song, "He'll Turn Your Scars into Stars" – later included on the album Heart & Soul (1986) – the sisters were invited to perform live on the following 27th Annual Grammy Awards in 1985, alongside their mother, where they performed "Hallelujah" as part of a medley with the year's fellow gospel nominees.

=== Denise's departure and subsequent projects (1986–1994) ===
In 1986, after a 4-year gap between releases, the sisters Jacky, Twinkie, Dorinda, and Karen (sister Denise left the group earlier that year) continued to release music, signing with Rejoice Records, a division of Word. This new deal yielded the Grammy-nominated Heart & Soul, featuring the mainstream single "Time Out". This project made a top-five debut on Billboard's Gospel Charts and garnered the group a Dove Award. It featured the original versions of "Jesus Is a Love Song", "There Is a Balm in Gilead", and "Pray for the USA", all of which have been re-recorded several times. Although not pictured, Denise had contributed to the album before her departure but was later removed from the album. The music took on a more contemporary sound with programmed drums and synthesizers. Also included on this album were "Smile, God Loves You", "I Am Blessed", and the funky aforementioned "He'll Turn Your Scars into Stars".

In 1988, The Clark Sisters released their Billboard chart-topping and critically acclaimed album Conqueror. It featured a bolder, more intense sound, with synthesizers, drum machines, and more funk-oriented beats. Conqueror quickly became a fan favorite with hits like "The Darkest Hour Is Just Before the Day", "Take Me Higher", "For the Love of the People", "Computers Rule the World", and the original studio version of "Jesus Forevermore".

In 1989, The Clark Sisters released their live album, Bringing It Back Home, recorded in their home town of Detroit. It was the last recording from The Clark Sisters on Word Records' Rejoice imprint and the last group album with Twinkie just before the launch of her solo career. The album included both previous hits and new material. It also featured guest appearances from Rance Allen and backing choir vocals from the Michigan State Choir under the direction of their mother, Dr. Mattie Moss Clark.

In 1994, The Clark Sisters (Jacky, Dorinda, and Karen) released their only studio album of the decade, Miracle, which was the first album recorded without the compositions and vocals of sister Twinkie. Produced by BeBe Winans and Michael J. Powell, this disc featured a modernized version of the Clark Sisters classic "Expect Your Miracle" (now simply titled "Miracle") and a remake of "Jesus Is the Best Thing". Dorinda made her songwriting debut on a Clark Sisters recording with "Work to Do". The album, although it fared well in sales, did not match the success of previous albums due to the Clark Sisters not being able to tour and promote the project due to the illness of their mother, Dr. Mattie Moss Clark, who died in September 1994 from diabetes complications.

=== Solo careers (1995–2006) ===
Following their last Word Records release, Twinkie resumed her calling as a minister and her solo career. She had previously released two solo albums under the Sound of Gospel Record label: 1979's Praise Belongs to God and 1981's Ye Shall Receive Power. In 1992 she recorded her independent solo album Comin' Home. She re-appeared in 1996 with a pair of albums to her credit: the solo studio release The Masterpiece for Ben Tankard's Tribute Records label and the live project Twinkie Clark-Terrell Presents the Florida A&M University Gospel Choir. She later released the following albums: Twinkie Clark & Friends: Live in Charlotte in 2002, Home Once Again: Live in Detroit in 2004, With Humility in 2011, Live & Unplugged in 2015, and with her nephew Larry Clark (her sister Denise's oldest son) The Generations in 2020.

Karen delivered her solo debut Finally Karen in 1997. The album, featuring The Clark Sisters, Faith Evans, and daughter Kierra Sheard, was nominated for a Grammy Award, in addition to winning a Soul Train Lady of Soul Award. She has since released five more solo albums: 2nd Chance, The Heavens Are Telling, It's Not Over, All in One, and Destined to Win.

Dorinda released her self-titled debut solo album, Dorinda Clark-Cole in 2002, earning her two Stellar Awards, and a Soul Train Lady of Soul award. She has since released four more solo albums: Live in Houston and Take It Back, each of which have earned her the award for Female Vocalist of the Year at the Stellar Awards; I Survived in 2011, and in 2015, she released her fifth solo album, Living It, which was nominated for a Grammy Award for Best Gospel Album.

Jacky released her first solo project, Expectancy, in 2005, which features The Clark Sisters on the track "Blessing Me". In 2014, she released an urban-inspired single, "My Season", followed by singles "Cover Me" and "Shout". In February 2020, she released a single "Feel Good", featuring Mary J. Blige and rapper Tia P.

The Clark Sisters have all contributed in various capacities to each other's albums, whether they sang or wrote lyrics.

=== Live...One Last Time and Grammy recognition (2007–2009) ===
On July 8, 2006, The Clark Sisters (Jacky, Twinkie, Dorinda, and Karen) recorded a live album in Houston, Texas, entitled Live...One Last Time. The recording was directed and produced by Donald Lawrence and was released as a CD on April 10, 2007 on EMI Gospel, followed by a CD/DVD Special Edition release on June 19, 2007. In support of the reunion album, the Clark Sisters embarked on a 25-city concert tour beginning October 4, 2007 in Nashville, Tennessee. Though they had been thrice nominated previously for the Best Soul Gospel Performance by a Duo or Group Grammy with 1982's Sincerely, 1986's Heart & Soul, and 1988's Conqueror without a win, the group was nominated for two Grammys in 2008. Live...One Last Time won the award for Best Traditional Gospel Album. Its album track "Blessed & Highly Favored" won the award for Best Gospel Performance, and as songwriter of "Blessed & Highly Favored," sister Karen Clark Sheard won the individual award for Best Gospel Song. Additionally, at the 50th Annual Grammy Awards ceremony featuring a gospel segment with Aretha Franklin, BeBe Winans, Israel & New Breed, and Trin-i-tee 5:7, the Clark Sisters performed a snippet of their signature hit "You Brought the Sunshine" when the ceremony was broadcast on February 10 at the Staples Center in Los Angeles.

Following the group's resurgence in popularity, Rhino Entertainment released a greatest-hits collection including material from three albums recorded for Word Records from the mid-1980s through the early 1990s, including the Grammy-nominated Heart & Soul. The album, Encore: The Best of the Clark Sisters, was released on February 12, 2008. In December of that year, TV One's popular hour-long music documentary series Unsung featured the Clark Sisters in its second episode. The episode, which highlighted the group's role in breaking down barriers in gospel music, featured interviews with each sister except sister Denise Clark-Bradford, who since leaving the group, had relocated to California and had begun a ministry.

In 2009, the Clark Sisters released their second Christmas album, entitled The Clark Sisters' Family Christmas, which featured special appearances by Karen's daughter Kierra Sheard, and their cousins Bill Moss, Jr. and James Moss (known as J. Moss). The album was produced by Karen's son, J. Drew Sheard, II.

=== Lifetime movie and The Return (2018–present) ===
On November 11, 2018, it was reported that The Clark Sisters would have a television biopic, The Clark Sisters: First Ladies of Gospel. The film aired on Lifetime on April 11, 2020, and netted a viewership of 2.7 million, giving the network its highest rated original movie in four years. The film was executive produced by Queen Latifah, Missy Elliott, and Mary J. Blige, and starred Aunjanue Ellis as Dr. Mattie Moss Clark, Angela Birchett as Jacky Clark Chisholm, Raven Goodwin as Denise Clark-Bradford, Christina Bell as Twinkie Clark, Sheléa Frazier as Dorinda Clark Cole, and Kierra Sheard as her mother, Karen Clark Sheard. The movie was directed by Christine Swanson, the story was by Camille Tucker, with a teleplay by Sylvia L. Jones and Camille Tucker.

On October 18, 2019, the Clark Sisters debuted their new single "Victory" on Erica Campbell's radio show Get Up Erica. The single was later released on November 15, 2019, through Karew/Motown Gospel/Capitol CMG On March 13, 2020, the Clark Sisters released their seventeenth album, The Return. Their first release in over a decade, it featured production from J. Drew Sheard, II, Warryn Campell, Rodney Jerkins, Jermaine Dupri, Mano Hines, and Kurt Carr, with a special feature by Snoop Dogg on the track, "His Love".

In September 2023, the Clark Sisters embarked on the Reunion Tour with Kirk Franklin, Tye Tribbett, Israel Houghton, and Tamela Mann. The tour spanned 29 shows across North America and ended in Dallas, Texas on November 24, 2023.

In January 2024, it was announced that the Clark Sisters would be honored with the Grammy Lifetime Achievement Award.

In June 2025, the Clark Sisters were selected for induction to the Gospel Music Hall of Fame in St. Louis, Missouri in September. In September, the group appeared on Mariah Carey's album, Here For It All (2025) on a track titled "Jesus I Do".

== Artistry ==
=== "The Clark Sound" ===
Since early in the group's development, Twinkie has been the chief songwriter, vocal arranger, and producer for the group. The Clark Sisters as a whole are renowned for their group style, dubbed as "the Clark Sound". They incorporate high and fast melismas, acrobatic trills and riffs, and deep, soulful growls or "squalls". While they have been praised for their precise harmonies, The Clark Sisters are also known for their individual, distinctive vocal styles, and while there is no single lead vocalist in the group, each sister has led a handful of songs over the years.

In his influential study The Gospel Sound (1971, updated 1997) author and Gospel producer Anthony Heilbut dismisses The Clark Sisters as representing an "overly busy, annoyingly mannered style". Heilbut states:

"Gospel singers still exhibit awesome power and range but their common denominator is the overly busy, annoyingly mannered style I call the "gospel-gargle" or "Detroit disease" (most of its authors, like Rance Allen or the Clark Sisters call the Motor City home). The excessive virtuosity defeats its own purposes, whether of expressing spirit or asserting self. One Philadelphia old-timer observes "I've never seen a whole generation sound alike."

— Anthony Heilbut, The Gospel Sound, Postscript II (1997), p. 334, Limelight Editions, New York, 1997

"Me and my sisters got a lot of our riffs and runs from her. The way she did her moans and groans, we’d do the same way... the way she’d improvise and ad lib, hit high notes, then go all the way down and hit low notes, we listened to all of that."

— Twinkie Clark speaking about Aretha Franklin.

The Clark Sisters have cited Aretha Franklin, who also grew up in Detroit, as a major musical influence. When Franklin died of pancreatic cancer in 2018, the Clark Sisters sang one of their signature songs, "Is My Living in Vain", at her funeral service.

=== Influence and covers ===
The Clark Sisters are credited as vocal inspirations to singers such as Mariah Carey, Faith Evans, Kelly Price, Beyoncé, Kelly Rowland, Michelle Williams, Missy Elliott, Queen Latifah, Mary J. Blige, and Yebba, as well as to girl groups like Xscape, SWV, and Destiny’s Child. Their musical influence has been celebrated through covers and interpolations from both religious and secular artists alike.

== Discography ==
=== Studio albums ===
List of albums, with selected chart positions, sales figures and certifications
Title	Album details	Peak chart positions		
Title	Album details	US Gospel	US Christian	US Holiday
Jesus Has a Lot to Give	Released: 1973; Label: Bilesse Records (#BM 354); Formats: LP	—	—	—
Mattie Moss Clark Presents the Clark Sisters	Released: 1974; Label: Bilesse Records (#BM 356); Formats: LP	—	—	—
Unworthy	Released: 1976; Label: Sound Of Gospel (#SOG 075); Formats: LP	—	—	—
Count It All Joy	Released: 1978; Label: Sound Of Gospel (#SOG 081); Formats: LP	20	—	—
New Dimensions Of Christmas Carols	Released: 1978; Label: Sound Of Gospel (#SOG 085); Formats: LP	—	—	—
He Gave Me Nothing to Lose	Released: 1979; Label: Sound Of Gospel (#SOG 092); Formats: LP	18	—	—
You Brought the Sunshine	Released: 1981; Label: Sound Of Gospel (#SOG 132); Formats: LP, cassette	3	—	—
Sincerely	Released: 1982; Label: New Birth Records (#NEW 7058); Formats: LP	8	—	—
Heart & Soul	Released: 1986; Label: Rejoice Records (#WR 8346); Formats: LP, CD, digital download	4	—	—
Conqueror	Released: October 18, 1988; Label: Rejoice Records, A&M Records (#WR-8400); Formats: LP, CD, cassette, digital download	7	29	—
Miracle	Released: March 22, 1994; Label: Sparrow Records (#G2 7243 8 51368 2 5); Formats: CD, cassette, digital download	8	—	—
The Clark Sisters' Family Christmas	Released: October 6, 2009; Label: EMI Gospel (#94724); Formats: CD, digital download	15	—	18
The Return	Released: March 13, 2020; Label: Karew Records, Motown Gospel (# B003051902); Formats: CD, digital download	2	—	—

=== Live albums ===
List of albums, with selected chart positions, sales figures and certifications
Title	Album details	Peak chart positions	
Title	Album details	US	US Gospel
Is My Living in Vain (with Mattie Moss Clark)	Released: 1980; Label: New Birth Records (#NEW-7056); Formats: LP, CD, cassette tape, digital download	—	1
Bringing It Back Home	Released: 1989; Label: Word Records, A&M (#CD 8449); Formats: LP, CD, VHS, digital download	—	13
Live - One Last Time	Released: 2007; Label: Rejoice Records, A&M Records (#EGD 81094); Formats: CD, digital download	56	1

=== Compilation albums ===
List of albums, with selected chart positions
Title	Album details	Peak chart positions
Title	Album details	US Gospel
Best	Released: 1986; Labels: Spirit And Truth Records (#SAT 6000); Formats: LP	—
Count It All Joy / He Gave Me Nothing to Lose	Released: October 8, 2002; Labels: Sound Of Gospel Records; Formats: CD, digital download	—
You Brought the Sunshine / Unworthy	Released: October 8, 2002; Labels: Sound Of Gospel Records (#SOG 2CD-3000); Formats: CD, digital download	—
Encore: The Best of The Clark Sisters	Released: February 12, 2008; Labels: Dexterity Sounds, Rhino Records (#R2 419452); Formats: CD	12
The Clark Sisters: The Definitive Collection	Released: May 20, 2008; Labels: Word Entertainment, Warner, Curb Records (#WD2-887407); Formats: CD, digital download	37
Power Play: 6 Big Hits! - The Clark Sisters	Released: January 22, 2010; Labels: Motown Gospel, EMI Gospel; Formats: CD, digital download	—
Beginnings	Released: January 24, 2012; Labels: Special Markets, Word; Formats: CD, digital download	—
Best of the Clark Sisters (Live)	Released: January 1, 2013; Labels: Motown Gospel; Formats: Digital download	—
Icon	Released: January 7, 2014; Labels: Capitol Christian Music Group, Motown Gospel (#B001961302); Formats: CD	28
You Brought the Sunshine (The Sound Of Gospel Recordings 1976–1981) (with Elbernita "Twinkie" Clark)	Released: January 31, 2020; Labels: Westbound Records (#CDSEWD 159); Formats: CD, digital download	—

=== Singles ===
==== As lead artist ====
List of singles, with selected chart positions and sales, showing year released and album name
Title	Year	Peak chart positions					Sales	Album
Title	Year	US Gospel	US Gospel Airplay	US Gospel Digital Sales	US Dance	US R&B /HH	Sales	Album
"Jesus Has a Lot to Give"	1973	—	—	—	—	—		Jesus Has a Lot to Give
"Is My Living in Vain"	1980	—	—	3	—	—		Is My Living In Vain
"Pure Gold"	1980	—	—	—	—	—		Is My Living In Vain
"Name It, Claim It"	1982	—	—	—	—	—		Sincerely
"World"	1982	—	—	—	—	—		Sincerely
"You Brought the Sunshine (Into My Life)"	1983	—	—	2	27	16	US: 200,000 (as of 1985)	You Brought the Sunshine
"Jesus Is a Love Song"	1986	—	—	—	—	—		Heart & Soul
"Pray for the U.S.A."	1986	—	—	—	—	—		Heart & Soul
"Time Out (Remix)"	1987	—	—	—	43	—		Heart & Soul
"My Redeemer Liveth"	1991	—	—	—	—	—		Bringing It Back Home
"Medley"	1991	—	—	—	—	—		Bringing It Back Home
"Miracle"	1994	—	—	—	—	—		Miracle
"Blessed & Highly Favored"	2007	1	1	1	—	—		Live: One Last Time
"Livin'"	2007	2	2	—	—	—		Live: One Last Time
"Victory"	2019	6	1	5	—	—		The Return
"His Love" (featuring Snoop Dogg)	2020	11	1	—	—	—		The Return

==== As a featured artist ====
Title	Year	Peak chart positions					Album
Title	Year	US Gospel	US Gospel Airplay	US AC	US R&B /HH	US Adult R&B	Album
"Lift Every Voice and Sing" (Melba Moore featuring Gerald Albright, Anita Baker, Bobby Brown, Terri Lyne Carrington, the Clark Sisters, Howard Hewett, Freddie Jackson, Stephanie Mills, Jeffrey Osbourne, Jake O, Dionne Warwick, BeBe & CeCe Winans, Stevie Wonder)	1990	—	—	—	9	—	Soul Exposed
"The First Noel" (Mary J. Blige with the Clark Sisters)	2014	—	—	21	—	—	A Mary Christmas
"Dance" (3 Winans Brothers featuring the Clark Sisters)	2015	7	—	—	—	15	Foreign Land
"Hey Devil!" (CeCe Winans featuring the Clark Sisters)	2017	22	24	—	—	—	Let Them Fall in Love
"Jesus I Do" (Mariah Carey featuring the Clark Sisters)	2025	5	1	—	—	—	Here For It All

==== Other charted songs ====
Title	Year	Peak chart positions			Album
Title	Year	US Gospel	US Gospel Digital Sales	US Gospel Stream.	Album
"Expect Your Miracle"	1980	—	7	—	Is My Living In Vain
"You Brought the Sunshine (Live)"	2007	11	2	15	Live: One Last Time
"Name It Claim It (Live)"	2007	—	9	—	Live: One Last Time
"Blessed & Highly Favored (Remix)" (Snoop Dogg featuring the Clark Sisters)	2018	—	24	—	Bible of Love

=== Other appearances ===
List of album appearances, showing year released and album name
Title	Year	Album
"Won't You Come a Christmasing" (Shirley Caesar featuring the Clark Sisters)	1986	Christmasing
"Jesus Forevermore (Live)" (The Clark Sisters)	1989	Black Gospel Explosion: Recorded Live
"Hallelujah (Live)" (The Clark Sisters)	1989	Black Gospel Explosion: Recorded Live
"Lift Every Voice and Sing" (Melba Moore featuring Gerald Albright, Anita Baker, Bobby Brown, Terri Lyne Carrington, The Clark Sisters, Howard Hewett, Freddie Jackson, Stephanie Mills, Jeffrey Osbourne, Jake O, Dionne Warwick, BeBe & CeCe Winans, Stevie Wonder)	1990	Soul Exposed
"Lift Up Your Heads, O Ye Gates" (Commissioned & the Clark Sisters)	1992	Handel's Messiah: A Soulful Celebration
"Nothing to Lose" (The Florida A&M University Gospel Choir featuring the Clark Sisters)	1996	Twinkie Clark-Terrell Presents
"Jesus is a Love Song" (Karen Clark-Sheard featuring the Clark Sisters)	1997	Finally Karen
"Pure Gold" (Karen Clark-Sheard featuring the Clark Sisters)	1997	Finally Karen...Live!
"Show Me the Way" (Dorinda Clark-Cole featuring the Clark Sisters)	2002	Dorinda Clark-Cole
"You Brought the Sunshine" (Kelly Price featuring the Clark Sisters)	2003	Priceless
"I'm Not Perfect" (Missy Elliott featuring the Clark Sisters)	2003	This Is Not a Test!
"I Made It" (Twinkie Clark featuring the Clark Sisters)	2004	Home Once Again: Live in Detroit
"Blessing Me" (Jacky Clark-Chisholm featuring the Clark Sisters)	2005	Expectancy
"Higher Ground" (Robert Randolph & the Clark Sisters)	2009	Oh Happy Day: An All-Star Music Celebration
"I Wanna Thank You" (The Clark Sisters, J. Moss, Kierra Sheard)	2009	Silky Soul Music...an All-star Tribute to Maze featuring Frankie Beverly
"Hallelujah Remix" (Twinkie Clark featuring the Clark Sisters)	2013	Live & Unplugged
"The First Noel" (Mary J. Blige featuring the Clark Sisters)	2013	A Mary Christmas
"Dance - Louie Vega Funk House Radio Edit" (3 Winans Brothers featuring the Clark Sisters)	2015	Foreign Land
"I'm Not Ashamed" (3 Winans Brothers featuring the Clark Sisters)	2015	Foreign Land
"Dance" (3 Winans Brothers featuring the Clark Sisters)	2015	Foreign Land
"Look to the Hills" (G E I featuring the Clark Sisters)	2016	GEI Live
"Hey Devil!" (CeCe Winans featuring the Clark Sisters)	2017	Let Them Fall in Love
"Blessed & Highly Favored (Remix)" (Snoop Dogg featuring the Clark Sisters)	2018	Bible of Love
"Dance - Mike Dunn's Gospel Re-Touch" (3 Winans Brothers, the Clark Sisters, Mike Dunn)	2019	Unreleased Project EP, Vol. 03
"Jesus I Do" (Mariah Carey featuring the Clark Sisters)	2025	Here For It All

== Awards ==
=== BET Awards ===
The BET Awards are awarded annually by the Black Entertainment Television network. The Clark Sisters have received 2 nominations.

Year	Award	Nominated work	Result
2008	Best Gospel Artist	Themselves	Nominated
2020	Dr. Bobby Jones Best Gospel/Inspirational Award	"Victory"	Nominated

=== Dove Awards ===
The Dove Awards are awarded annually by the Gospel Music Association. The Clark Sisters have won 2 awards from 11 nominations.

Year	Award	Nominated work	Result
1983	Inspirational Black Gospel Album of the Year	Sincerely	Nominated
1987	Contemporary Black Gospel Album of the Year	Heart & Soul	Won
1995	Traditional Black Gospel Recorded Song of the Year	"Amazing Grace"	Nominated
2008	Artist of the Year	Themselves	Nominated
2008	Group of the Year	Themselves	Nominated
2008	Contemporary Gospel Recorded Song of the Year	"Blessed and Highly Favored"	Nominated
2008	Contemporary Gospel Album of the Year	Live – One Last Time	Nominated
2020	Traditional Gospel Recorded Song of the Year	"Victory"	Nominated
2020	Inspirational Film of the Year	The Clark Sisters: First Ladies of Gospel	Nominated
2020	Traditional Gospel Album of the Year	The Return	Won
2026	Contemporary Gospel Recorded Song of the Year	"Jesus I Do" (with Mariah Carey)	Pending

=== Grammy Awards ===
The Grammy Awards are awarded annually by the National Academy of Recording Arts and Sciences. The Clark Sisters have won 3 awards from 7 nominations, including a Lifetime Achievement award.

Year	Award	Nominated work	Result
1983	Best Soul Gospel Performance by a Duo or Group	Sincerely	Nominated
1987	Best Soul Gospel Performance by a Duo or Group, Choir or Chorus	Heart & Soul	Nominated
1988	Best Soul Gospel Performance by a Duo or Group, Choir or Chorus	Conqueror	Nominated
1990	Best Traditional Soul Gospel Album	Bringing it Back Home	Nominated
2007	Best Gospel Performance	"Blessed & Highly Favored"	Won
2007	Best Traditional Gospel Album	Live: One Last Time	Won
2009	Best R&B Performance by a Duo or Group with Vocals	"Higher Ground"	Nominated
2024	Grammy Lifetime Achievement Award	Themselves	Honored

=== NAACP Image Awards ===
The NAACP Image Awards are awarded annually by the National Association for the Advancement of Colored People (NAACP). The Clark Sisters have won 2 awards from 6 nominations.

Year	Award	Nominated work	Result
1983	Outstanding Gospel Artist	Themselves	Won
1989	Outstanding Gospel Artist	Themselves	Nominated
2020	Outstanding Gospel/Christian Song – Traditional or Contemporary	"Victory"	Nominated
2021	Outstanding Gospel/Christian Album	The Return	Won
2026	Outstanding Duo, Group or Collaboration (Traditional)	"Jesus I Do" (with Mariah Carey)	Nominated
2026	Outstanding Gospel/Christian Song	"Jesus I Do" (with Mariah Carey)	Nominated

=== Soul Train Awards ===
The Soul Train Music Awards are awarded annually. The Clark Sisters have received 3 nominations.

Year	Award	Nominated work	Result
1988	Best Gospel Album – Group or Choir	Heart & Soul	Nominated
1989	Best Gospel Album	Conqueror	Nominated
2020	Best Gospel/Inspirational Award	Themselves	Nominated

=== Stellar Awards ===
The Stellar Awards are awarded annually by SAGMA. The Clark Sisters have received 8 awards and 2 honorary awards.

Year	Award	Nominated work	Result
2007	The Chevrolet Most Notable Achievement Award	Themselves	Honored
2008	CD of the Year	Live... One Last Time	Won
2008	Artist of the Year	Live... One Last Time	Won
2008	Group or Duo of the Year	Live... One Last Time	Won
2008	Traditional Group/Duo of the Year	Live... One Last Time	Won
2009	Special Event CD of the Year	Encore: The Best of the Clark Sisters	Won
2010	Special Event CD of the Year	Silky Soul Music... An All-Star Tribute to Maze (with Kierra Sheard and J. Moss)	Won
2020	James Cleveland Lifetime Achievement Award	Themselves	Honored
2021	Contemporary Duo/Group Chorus of the Year	The Return	Won
2021	Duo/Group Chorus of the Year	The Return	Nominated
2021	Traditional Duo/Group Chorus of the Year	Gospel According to PJ	Won
2026	Contemporary Duo/Chorus Group of the Year	"Jesus I Do" (with Mariah Carey)	Nominated

=== Miscellaneous honors ===
Year	Organization	Award	Nominated work	Result
1999	Michigan's International Gospel Music Hall of Fame		The Clark Sisters	Inducted
2019	Essence Fest's Strength Of A Woman Brunch	Strength of A Woman Award	The Clark Sisters	Honored
2022	Black Music & Entertainment Walk of Fame		The Clark Sisters	Inducted
2025	Gospel Music Hall of Fame Missouri		The Clark Sisters	Inducted
2026	Hollywood Walk of Fame		The Clark Sisters	Inducted
