= Is My Living in Vain =

Single by The Clark Sisters

from the album Is My Living in Vain
- Released: 1980
- Genre: Contemporary gospel
- Length: 3:18
- Label: Sound of Gospel Records
- Songwriter: Elbernita Clark

"Is My Living in Vain" is an American gospel song written by Elbernita "Twinkie" Clark and performed by the Clark Sisters, which first appeared on their 1980 live album, Is My Living in Vain, and released as a single the same year. The Clark Sisters recorded the song and album live at Bailey Cathedral Church of God in Christ in Detroit, Michigan. The song proved to be the first big hit for the quintet, propelling them to national exposure.

The lyrics are a series of rhetorical questions asking if the singers' actions are in vain. Each sister sings a line of the song, vocally declaring that their dedication to Christ is not a useless effort.

The song has since been covered and sampled by a number of singers.

The singer Bilal names the song's LP among his 25 favorite albums, calling it one of the Clark Sisters' best and "an incredible gospel album".

On August 31, 2018, the Clark Sisters performed the song live at Aretha Franklin's funeral in Detroit.

== Cover versions and uses in popular culture ==
In 1993, American group Xscape covered "Is My Living in Vain" for their debut album Hummin' Comin' at 'Cha. In 2006, the song was again covered by Zie'l. The song is sampled in the 2017 song "Talking to God, Pt. 2" by rapper Deante' Hitchcock. Bonnie Prince Billy recorded a poignant cover on his 2025 LP The Purple Bird.

== Chart performance ==
Chart (2018)	Peak position
US Gospel Digital Song Sales	3
