= Encore (Clark Sisters album) =

Encore: The Best of The Clark Sisters

Greatest hits album by The Clark Sisters
- Released: February 12, 2008
- Recorded: 1986–1994
- Genre: Gospel music
- Label: Dexterity Sounds/Rhino Entertainment/WEA

The Clark Sisters chronology
Live... One Last Time (2007)	Encore: The Best of The Clark Sisters (2008)	The Clark Sisters Definitive Gospel Collection (2008)

Encore: The Best of The Clark Sisters is a greatest hits collection by seminal gospel singing group The Clark Sisters to be released on February 12, 2008, through Dexterity Sounds/Rhino Entertainment.

The collection is the first of its kind, chronicling the group's mid- to late-80's recordings for Word/A&M. Though the Clark Sisters made their mark on the genre as independent artists, this collection spans the albums Bringing It Back Home, Conqueror, and the Grammy-nominated Heart & Soul from their first major label recording contract.

Apart from the Word recordings, this collection opens with a new recording of their hit song "You Brought The Sunshine" featuring American Idol finalist Melinda Doolittle. Encore also includes The Clarks' "Follow The Star" (with Dorinda on lead) from the holiday compilation of the same name. The album includes commentary by sisters Jacky and Karen between songs.

== Track listing ==
Tracks 2, 6, 7, 8, 10 originally appeared on the album Heart & Soul (1986). Tracks 3, 9, 11 originally appeared on the album Conqueror (1988). Tracks 4, 5, 13 originally appeared on the album Bringing It Back Home (1991).

1. You Brought The Sunshine (feat. Melinda Doolittle)
2. There Is A Balm In Gilead
3. More Than A Conqueror
4. My Redeemer Liveth (live)
5. I've Got The Victory
6. I Am Blessed
7. Pray For The USA
8. Time Out
9. I Won't Let You Go Until You Bless My Soul
10. Jesus Is A Love Song
11. Take Me Higher
12. Follow The Star (feat. Dorinda Clark-Cole and Angie Winans)
13. Medley: Is My Living In Vain/You Brought The Sunshine/Hallelujah (live)
