= Mattie Moss Clark =

American gospel singer (1925–1994)

Dr. Mattie Moss Clark

Background information
- Born: Mattie Juliet Moss; March 26, 1925; Selma, Alabama, U.S.
- Died: September 22, 1994 (aged 69) Southfield, Michigan, U.S.
- Genres: Gospel; urban contemporary gospel; Christian R&B
- Occupations: Singer; songwriter; record producer; manager; composer; choir director
- Instruments: Vocals; piano; keyboards; Hammond organ
- Labels: Capitol Christian Music Group; Sound of Gospel; Westbound; Elektra; Rejoice; Sparrow; Kapp; Savoy; Malaco; Bilesse; Mattie Moss Clark Records
- Children: 6

Mattie Moss Clark (born Mattie Juliet Moss; March 26, 1925 – September 22, 1994) was an American gospel choir director and the mother of The Clark Sisters, a gospel vocal group. She was the longest-serving international minister of music for the Church of God in Christ (COGIC). "Her arrangements, perhaps influenced by her classical training, replaced the unison or two-part textures of earlier gospel music with three-part settings of the music for soprano, alto, and tenor voice ranges—a technique that remained common in gospel choir music for decades afterward."

== Early life ==
Mattie Juliet Moss was born the seventh of nine children to ministers Fred John Moss and Mattie Juliet Walker in Selma, Alabama. She began playing piano at six. By twelve, she had become the musician for her mother's services at the Holiness Temple Church of Christ in Prayer and traveled with her mother to play at mission services, a trend she passed on to daughter Twinkie.

After high school, she attended Selma University and received training in classical music and choral singing. She moved to Detroit in 1947 to be with her sister Sybil Burke and became a member of Greater Love Tabernacle Church of God in Christ. There, under the leadership of Bishop W. Rimson, she was baptized in the Holy Ghost and subsequently became the minister of music for both Southwest Michigan Jurisdiction and Bailey Cathedral Church of God in Christ, under Bishop John Seth Bailey. Soon she was in demand to train choirs at churches throughout the brotherhood of COGIC.

== Career ==
In 1958, she recorded "Going to Heaven to Meet the King", with the Southwest Michigan State Choir, becoming one of the first to teach and conduct a mass choir composed of members of different churches. She received three gold albums with the Southwest Michigan State Choir, and went on to write and arrange hundreds of songs and recorded over 50 albums. She directed Cadillac Motor Company's Christmas choir for 11 years and also conducted community-wide mass choirs for the NAACP Freedom Fund Dinners.

In early 1968, Clark and Elma Hendricks convened a Sing-A-Rama in Detroit at Reverend C. L. Franklin's New Bethel Baptist Church (Detroit, Michigan). They formed a 1,000 voice choir and had gospel singer James Cleveland as a special guest. Cleveland so enjoyed the music and teaching classes that he told Clark he would like to create a similar convocation and maybe call it the Music Workshop of America. He suggested that he add "Gospel" to the title to let prospective attendees know it was gospel music only. The first Gospel Music Workshop of America (GMWA) convention took place in August 1968 at the King Solomon Baptist Church in Detroit.

In 1979, she founded the Clark Conservatory of Music, a music school in Detroit, which was subsequently headed by her daughter Dorinda Clark-Cole.

In 1981, Trinity College in Pennsylvania conferred upon her the degree of Doctor of Humanities. After the death of Bishop Bailey in 1985, she continued as state minister of music for Southwest Michigan Jurisdiction #1, attending Greater Mitchell Church of God in Christ, under Bishop J.H. Sheard.

== Personal life ==
Clark married twice. She married her first husband, Leo Henry Cullum Sr, on December 30, 1945, and had two children, Leo Henry Cullum, Jr. and Jacqueline Lenita. After their divorce, she married Elder Elbert Clark (1927-2001) on November 30, 1952, and had four children, Denise Darchell, Elbernita Dionne, Dorinda Grace, and Karen Valencia. The Clarks divorced in 1973. Dr. Clark mentored her daughters, having them sing as part of her and their father's church's choir, Berea Church of God In Christ.

In 1973, shortly after divorcing Elbert Clark, Clark sparked the forming of The Clark Sisters. After nearly ten years, Clark passed responsibility for the group to daughter Twinkie (Elbernita), who became the leader of the group.

== Later years ==
In the late 1980s and early 1990s, Clark's health began to decline due to diabetes. According to Dorinda Clark-Cole, she had her right leg amputated and suffered a stroke, due to which she used a wheelchair. Despite failing health, Clark continued to record music into the last year of her life before succumbing to complications from diabetes on September 22, 1994, at Providence Hospital in Southfield, Michigan, at age 69.

She was interred at Roseland Park Cemetery in Oakland County, Michigan.

In addition to The Clark Sisters, Mattie Moss Clark's gospel singing legacy continues through her grandchildren Kierra Sheard, J. Drew Sheard, Angel Chisholm, Lorenzo, Larry and Derrick (of the Clark Brothers), and her nephews Bill Moss Jr., and J. Moss (part of the production team PAJAM).

Actress Aunjanue Ellis played Clark in the 2020 Lifetime biopic The Clark Sisters: First Ladies of Gospel to positive feedback from fans, critics, and the Clark Sisters themselves.

== Discography ==
=== Studio albums ===
List of albums with dates released, and references
| Title | Album details |
|---|---|
| A City Called Heaven (with The Southwest Michigan State Choir Of The Church Of God In Christ) | Released: 1966; Label: Savoy Records; Formats: LP |
| Mattie Moss Clark and The Clesiastic Sounds of the Church of God In Christ Detroit, Mich | Released: 1969; Label: Savoy Records; Formats: LP |
| Seek Him And He Will Let You Come In | Released: 1970; Label: Savoy Records; Formats: LP |
| Wonderful Grace Of Jesus | Released: 1971; Label: Westbound Records; Formats: LP |
| That's Christ (with The Michigan State Community Choir (Note: Now known as The Southwest Michigan State Choir Of The Church Of God In Christ)) | Released: 1972; Label: Westbound Records; Formats: LP |
| The Hands Of God Reached Out And Touched Me (with The South Michigan State Community Choir) | Released: 1973; Label: Westbound Records; Formats: LP |
| A Song Is Born Vol. 1 | Released: 1973; Label: Bilesse Records; Formats: LP |
| I Don't Know What I Would Do Without The Lord (with The Michigan State Community Choir) | Released: 1974; Label: Westbound Records; Formats: LP |
| The Wages Of Sin Is Death (with The Michigan State Community Choir) | Released: 1975; Label: Sound of Gospel Records; Formats: LP |
| He Was Hung-Up For My Hang-Ups | Released: 1976; Label: Sound of Gospel Records; Formats: LP |
| New Dimensions Of Christmas Carols (with The Clark Sisters) | Released: 1978; Label: Sound of Gospel Records; Formats: LP |
| I Am Crucified With Christ (with The Michigan State Community Choir) | Released: 1978; Label: Sound of Gospel Records; Formats: LP |
| Make Me That Building Not Made By Hand | Released: 1979; Label: Sound of Gospel Records; Formats: LP |
| I Am Not Alone | Released: 1979; Label: Sound of Gospel Records; Formats: LP |
| Is My Living In Vain (with The Dynamic Clark Sisters (Note: Now known as The Clark Sisters)) | Released: 1980; Label: New Birth Records, Point Productions, Sony Music Special Products: Formats: LP, CD, Cassette |
| God's Got All You Need (with The Michigan State Community Choir) | Released: 1980; Label: Sound of Gospel Records; Formats: LP |
| That's Christ | Released: 1980; Label: Sound of Gospel Records; Formats: LP |
| Douglas Miller And The Texas Southeast State Choir With Mattie M. Clark (Recorded Live) (with Douglas Miller) | Released: 1981; Label: GosPearl Records; Formats: LP |
| Humble Thyself (with The Southwest Michigan State Choir) | Released: 1984; Label: DME Records; Formats: LP, Cassette |
| The Southern California Holy Gospel Music Workshop | Released: 1986; Label: Spirit & Truth Records; Formats: LP |
| Watch Ye Therefore (with The Michigan State Mass Choir) | Released: 1994; Label: Crystal Rose Records, Sparrow Records; Formats: LP |

=== Albums directed and presented ===
List of albums with dates released, and references
| Album | Year | Notes |
|---|---|---|
| The Southwest Michigan State Choir Of The Church Of God In Christ Directed By Mattie Moss Clark: None But The Pure In Heart | 1964 | Director |
| The Southwest Michigan State Choir Of The Church Of God In Christ Directed By Mattie Moss Clark: Wonderful, Wonderful | 1964 | Director |
| Southwest Michigan State Choir Of The Church Of God In Christ Directed By Mattie Moss Clark: Lord, Renew My Spirit Within | 1968 | Director |
| 65th Annual Holy Convocation (Pentecost At Any Cost) | 1973 | Director |
| Mattie Moss Clark Presents The Clark Sisters | 1974 | Presenter |
| A Song Is Born Vol. III | 1975 | Director |
| A Song Is Born: Volume 4 Part 1 | 1976 | Director |
| A Song Is Born: Volume 4 Part 2 | 1976 | Presenter |
| Because He Lives | 1979 | Director |
| The Best Of The Southwest Michigan State Choir Of The Church Of God In Christ | 1979 | Composer, Arranger, Director |
| U.N.A.C. 5 Volume One | 1979 | Producer, Director |
| U.N.A.C. 5 Volume Three | 1979 | Producer, Director |
| U.N.A.C. 5 Volume Four | 1979 | Producer, Director |
| Live! U.N.A.C. 5 Miami Beach 1980 Volume 2 | 1980 | Director |
| Mattie Moss Clark presents Esther Smith & The Voices Of Deliverance – Recorded Live! At International Gospel Center, Ecorse, Michigan | 1980 | Presenter |
| Mattie Moss Clark Directs Southwest Michigan State Choir – Christ Won't Fail | 1982 | Presenter |
| Mattie Moss Clark Presents The Greater Williams Temple Choir (C.O.G.I.C.) – Live | 1982 | Presenter |
| Christ Won't Fail | 1982 | Director |
| Mattie Moss Clark Presents Kenneth Ward & The Central Illinois Mass Choir | 1983 | Presenter |
| Mattie Moss Clark, U.N.A.C-V Presents A Song Is Born, Recorded Live in Washington, D.C. | 1984 | Presenter |
| Mattie Moss Clark Presents UNAC 5* – Live At The Miami Beach Convention Center, Miami, Florida - July 6, 1985 | 1985 | Booking, Presenter, Executive Producer |
| Mattie Moss Clark Presents The Church Of God In Christ International Mass Choir "A Song Is Born" - UNAC 5 Houston 1986 - Recorded Live | 1986 | Producer, Presenter |
| Dr. Mattie Moss Clark Presents Corey Skinner’s Collegiate Voices Of Faith | 1993 | Presenter |
| Mattie Moss Clark Presents The C.O.G.I.C. National Music Choir – Live In Atlanta | 1994 | Presenter |
| Mattie Moss Clark Presents A Reunion Of The Southwest Michigan State Choir (Recorded Live At Bailey Cathedral C.O.G.I.C., Detroit, MI) | 1995 | Presenter |
| Mattie Moss Clark Presents Tony McGill & The Southern California Holy Gospel Music Feast (Live In Los Angeles) | 1995 | Presenter |

=== Other appearances ===
List of songs appeared on with dates released
| Title | Year | Album |
|---|---|---|
| "Lord Do Something For Me" | 1959 | Lord Do Something For Me |
| "None But The Pure In Heart" | 1964 | The Southwest Michigan State Choir Of The Church Of God In Christ Directed By Mattie Moss Clark: None But The Pure In Heart |
| "I've Tried Jesus Yes He's Real" | 1964 | The Southwest Michigan State Choir Of The Church Of God In Christ Directed By Mattie Moss Clark: None But The Pure In Heart |
| "Sanctify Me Holy" | 1964 | The Southwest Michigan State Choir Of The Church Of God In Christ Directed By Mattie Moss Clark: None But The Pure In Heart |
| "Put On The Whole Armour Of God" | 1964 | The Southwest Michigan State Choir Of The Church Of God In Christ Directed By Mattie Moss Clark: None But The Pure In Heart |
| "Wonderful! Wonderful!" | 1964 | The Southwest Michigan State Choir Of The Church Of God In Christ Directed By Mattie Moss Clark: Wonderful, Wonderful |
| "Put Your Trust In Jesus" | 1964 | The Southwest Michigan State Choir Of The Church Of God In Christ Directed By Mattie Moss Clark: Wonderful, Wonderful |
| "I Found Joy In The Holy Ghost" | 1967 | A Closer Walk With Thee |
| "He Will Supply Your Need" | 1967 | A Closer Walk With Thee |
| "What I Need To Keep Me" | 1968 | Southwest Michigan State Choir Of The Church Of God In Christ Directed By Mattie Moss Clark: Lord, Renew My Spirit Within |
| "Lord, Renew My Spirit Within" | 1968 | Southwest Michigan State Choir Of The Church Of God In Christ Directed By Mattie Moss Clark: Lord, Renew My Spirit Within |
| "He Abides" | 1971 | James Cleveland Presents The Gospel Workshop Of America Mass Choir – Recorded Live In Dallas, Texas |
| "Renew My Spirit" | 1974 | Mattie Moss Clark Presents The Clark Sisters |
| "Jesus Loves You" | 1976 | Unworthy |
| "Time To Seek The Lord" | 1978 | Count It All Joy |
| "Prepare Yourself" | 1978 | Count It All Joy |
| "My Cup Runneth Over" | 1979 | He Gave Me Nothing To Lose |
| "He Abides" | 1979 | The Best Of The Southwest Michigan State Choir Of The Church Of God In Christ |
| "None But The Pure In My Heart" | 1979 | The Best Of The Southwest Michigan State Choir Of The Church Of God In Christ |
| "Sanctify Me Holy" | 1979 | The Best Of The Southwest Michigan State Choir Of The Church Of God In Christ |
| "Wonderful, Wonderful, Wonderful" | 1979 | The Best Of The Southwest Michigan State Choir Of The Church Of God In Christ |
| "Lord Renew My Spirit Within" | 1979 | The Best Of The Southwest Michigan State Choir Of The Church Of God In Christ |
| "Salvation Is Free" | 1979 | The Best Of The Southwest Michigan State Choir Of The Church Of God In Christ |
| "He Delivered Me" | 1979 | The Best Of The Southwest Michigan State Choir Of The Church Of God In Christ |
| "Now The Day Is Over" | 1980 | Mattie Moss Clark presents Esther Smith & The Voices Of Deliverance – Recorded Live! At International Gospel Center, Ecorse, Michigan |
| "Thy Word Have I Hidden In My Heart" | 1980 | Mattie Moss Clark presents Esther Smith & The Voices Of Deliverance – Recorded Live! At International Gospel Center, Ecorse, Michigan |
| "We Have Come To Worship" | 1980 | Take One Day At A Time |
| "Unto Thee Old Lord" | 1980 | Take One Day At A Time |
| "Blessed Be Thy Name" | 1980 | Take One Day At A Time |
| "I Can Do All things" | 1980 | COGIC International Mass Choir Presents: I Can Do All Things |
| "Even Me Lord" | 1980 | COGIC International Mass Choir Presents: I Can Do All Things |
| "Psalms 31" | 1981 | You Brought the Sunshine |
| "Someday" | 1982 | Mattie Moss Clark Presents The Greater Williams Temple Choir (C.O.G.I.C.) – Live |
| "Never Mind" | 1982 | Sincerely |
| "Christ Won't Fail" | 1982 | Mattie Moss Clark Directs Southwest Michigan State Choir – Christ Won't Fail |
| "The Lord Is My Light" | 1982 | Mattie Moss Clark Directs Southwest Michigan State Choir – Christ Won't Fail |
| "Lift Up The Standard For The King" | 1982 | Mattie Moss Clark Directs Southwest Michigan State Choir – Christ Won't Fail |
| "I've Never Seen The Righteous Forsaken" | 1986 | Mattie Moss Clark Presents The Church Of God In Christ International Mass Choir "A Song Is Born" - UNAC 5 Houston 1986 - Recorded Live |
| "My Faith Looks Up To Thee" (arranged by Moss Clark) | 1986 | Mattie Moss Clark Presents The Church Of God In Christ International Mass Choir "A Song Is Born" - UNAC 5 Houston 1986 - Recorded Live |
| "I Tried Jesus" | 1993 | Dr. Mattie Moss Clark Presents Corey Skinner’s Collegiate Voices Of Faith |
| "Be Still And Know That I Am God" | 1994 | Dr. Mattie Moss Clark* Presents The C.O.G.I.C. National Music Choir – Live In Atlanta |
| "Be Still (Reprise)" | 1994 | Dr. Mattie Moss Clark* Presents The C.O.G.I.C. National Music Choir – Live In Atlanta |

== Accolades ==
| Year | Organization | Award | Result | Ref. |
|---|---|---|---|---|
| 1981 | Trinity College | Honorary Doctorate degree of Humanity | Awarded | |
| 1990 | Michigan State University | Michigan Heritage Award | Honored | |
| 1998 | Michigan's International Gospel Music Hall of Fame | | Honored | |
