= Denise Clark-Bradford =

American gospel singer, born 1957

- Also known as: Denise Clark Morrison
- Born: Denise Darchell Clark; September 10, 1953 (age 73); Detroit, Michigan, U.S
- Origin: Detroit, Michigan
- Genres: Gospel
- Occupations: Evangelist; Singer; Songwriter
- Instruments: Vocals; piano; organ; drums
- Years active: 1966–1986
- Labels: GospoCentric; Light; Karew
- Formerly of: The Clark Sisters

Denise Darchell "Niecy" Clark-Bradford (born Denise Darchell Clark; September 10, 1953) is an American Grammy Award-winning gospel singer. Clark–Bradford is best known as an original member of family vocal group The Clark Sisters and as a daughter of pioneering choral director Mattie Moss Clark. As a member of The Clark Sisters, Clark–Bradford has been honored with a Grammy Lifetime Achievement Award.

== Biography ==
Clark-Bradford was born in Detroit, Michigan to world-renowned gospel choir director, gold-certified singer, and musician Mattie Moss Clark and Pastor Elbert Clark. Clark-Bradford was taught to sing alongside her sisters at a young age, with the goal of forming a powerful group of female evangelists who would win souls for God with their voices. By 1966, Clark-Bradford and her sisters were performing behind their mother at church services, usually singing her songs.

Clark-Bradford left The Clark Sisters in 1986 and began her own ministry in California. Her last contribution to the group was that year's Heart & Soul album, which was released after a four-year gap.

== Awards ==
=== Dove Awards ===
The Dove Awards are awarded annually by the Gospel Music Association. Clark-Bradford has won 1 award from 2 nominations.

Year	Award	Nominated work	Result
1983	Inspirational Black Gospel Album of the Year	Sincerely	Nominated
1987	Contemporary Gospel Album of the Year	Heart & Soul	Won

=== Grammy Awards ===
The Grammy Awards are awarded annually by the National Academy of Recording Arts and Sciences. Clark-Bradford has earned a Lifetime Achievement award as well as 2 competitive nominations.

Year	Award	Nominated work	Result
1983	Best Soul Gospel Performance by a Duo or Group	Sincerely	Nominated
1987	Best Soul Gospel Performance by a Duo or Group, Choir or Chorus	Heart & Soul	Nominated
2024	Grammy Lifetime Achievement Award	The Clark Sisters	Honored

=== NAACP Image Awards ===
The NAACP Image Awards are awarded annually by the National Association for the Advancement of Colored People (NAACP). Clark-Bradford has received 1 award.

Year	Award	Nominated work	Result
1983	Outstanding Gospel Artist	The Clark Sisters	Won

=== Soul Train Awards ===
The Soul Train Music Awards are awarded annually. Clark-Bradford has received 1 nomination.

Year	Award	Nominated work	Result
1988	Best Gospel Album – Group or Choir	Heart & Soul	Nominated
