= Live – One Last Time =

Live - One Last Time

Live album by The Clark Sisters
- Released: April 10, 2007
- Recorded: July 8, 2006
- Genres: Gospel, CCM
- Length: 1:16:45
- Label: EMI Gospel

The Clark Sisters chronology
Miracle (1994)	Live - One Last Time (2007)	Encore: The Best of the Clark Sisters (2008)

Live – One Last Time is a live album released by Christian gospel quartet The Clark Sisters. The concert was recorded on July 8, 2006. The album was produced by EMI Gospel and released on April 10, 2007. The album won three Grammys.

== Track listing ==
All songs written by Elbernita "Twinkie" Clark-Terrell, except where noted.

1. "Livin'" (Donald Lawrence, Loren McGee) - 5:15
2. "Blessed & Highly Favored" (Karen Clark-Sheard) - 5:17
3. "Something New" - 6:37
4. "Instrument" (Donald Lawrence) - 6:41
5. "You Heard My Cry" - 5:15
6. "Tried Him and I Know Him" - 2:31
7. "Holy Will" - 1:54
8. "Name It Claim It" - 2:50
9. "Looking to Get There (Heaven)" (Dorinda Clark-Cole) - 6:30
10. "God Understands All" - 3:10
11. "I've Got an Angel" - 4:09
12. "My Redeemer Liveth" - 3:53
13. "World" - 3:55
14. "Pray for the U.S.A." - 4:13
15. "Pray for the U.S.A. (Reprise)" - 4:41
16. "Jesus Is a Love Song" - 3:36
17. "You Brought the Sunshine" - 4:18

== Awards ==
The album won a Grammy Award for Best Traditional Gospel Album at the 50th Grammy Awards, while the song "Blessed & Highly Favored" won both Best Gospel Song and Best Gospel Performance (in a tie with "Never Gonna Break My Faith" from Aretha Franklin and Mary J. Blige). The Clark Sisters also performed during the awards ceremony.

Both the album and the song were also nominated for Dove Awards for Contemporary Gospel Album of the Year and Contemporary Gospel Recorded Song of the Year at the 39th GMA Dove Awards.

== Chart performance ==
The album peaked at number 56 on the US Billboard 200 and number one on Billboard's Top Gospel Albums chart, where it spent 81 weeks on that chart.

=== Weekly charts ===
Chart (2007)	Peak position
US Billboard 200	56
US Top Gospel Albums (Billboard)	1

=== Year-end charts ===
Chart (2007)	Peak position
US Top Gospel Albums (Billboard)	12
Chart (2008)	Peak position
US Top Gospel Albums (Billboard)	12
