= Grammy Award for Best Soul Gospel Performance by a Duo or Group, Choir or Chorus =

Music award category

The Grammy Award for Soul Gospel Performance by a Duo or Group, Choir or Chorus was awarded from 1984 to 1990.

Years reflect the year in which the Grammy Awards were presented, for works released in the previous year.

== Recipients ==
Year	Winner(s)	Title	Nominees	Ref.
1984	Bobby Jones & New Life with Barbara Mandrell	I'm So Glad I'm Standing Here Today	Sandra Crouch, Andraé Crouch for Glad I Heard Your Voice; Sandra Crouch, Andraé Crouch, Linda McCray, Jean Johnson for He's Worthy; The Winans for Long Time Comin'; Clark Sisters for Sincerely	
1985	Shirley Caesar, Al Green	Sailin' on the Sea of Your Love	Edwin Hawkins for Angels Will Be Singing; Bebe & CeCe Winans for Lord Life Us Up; Richard Smallwood Singers for Psalms; Shirley Caesar, Anne Caesar Price for Rejoice	
1986	The Winans	Tomorrow	Sandra Crouch, Jean Johnson for Completely Yes; Edwin Hawkins with Music & Arts Seminar Mass Choir for Have Mercy; Carvin Winans, Michael Winans for Tomorrow Track from Tomorrow; Sandra Crouch & Friends for We're Waiting	
1987	The Winans	Let My People Go	The Winans with Vanessa Bell Armstrong for Choose Ye; Dorothy Norwood, Rev. F. C. Barnes, Rev. Janice Brown, Albertina Walker, Rev. James Cleveland for Dorothy Norwood and Friends; James Cleveland & California Community Choir for James Cleveland and the Southern California Community Choir; Albertina Walker, Shirley Caesar for Jesus Is Mine	
1988	The Winans, Anita Baker	Ain't No Need to Worry	BeBe & CeCe Winans for BeBe and CeCe Winans; The Winans for Decisions; Edwin Hawkins & the Music and Arts Seminar Mass Choir for Give Us Peace; Clark Sisters for Heart and Soul	
1989	Take 6	Take 6	Clark Sisters for Conqueror; New Jersey Mass Choir for Hold Up the Light; Aretha Franklin, Miles Staples for Oh Happy Days; Ronald Winans Family & Friends Choir for Ron Winans Family and Friends Choir; Edwin Hawkins for That Name	
1990	Daniel Winans with The Winans & BeBe Winans	Let Brotherly Love Continue	Minister Thomas Whitfield and The Thomas Whitfield Company for And They Sang a Hymn; Rev. Milton Brunson and the Thompson Community Singers for Available to You; L.A. Mass Choir for Can't Hold Back; Commissioned for That Name	
