= Black Music & Entertainment Walk of Fame =

Walk of fame located in Atlanta, Georgia

- Established: 2021
- Location: Atlanta, Georgia, U.S.
- Type: Entertainment walk of fame
- Website: Official website

The Black Music & Entertainment Walk of Fame is located in Atlanta, Georgia, and was inaugurated in January 2021. The goal of the monument is to honor African Americans, and Black people internationally, for their achievements in entertainment. The Walk of Fame is located in the historic Downtown Atlanta area, on the sidewalks of Martin Luther King Jr. Drive and Northside Drive.

Quincy Jones, Otis Redding, and James Brown were among the first to be honored, as "Foundational Inductees", and were inducted in June 2021. There are seven categories for induction; there are separate male and female categories in both hip-hop and mainstream (the Walk of Fame uses the term "mainstream" to differentiate R&B from hip-hop). While there's one combined male/female category for legacy artists, gospel and music & entertainment moguls. Thirty-five performers were nominated for the inaugural ceremony. The ceremony was set for June 17, 2021. Other inaugural inductees include Stevie Wonder, Michael Jackson, Beyoncé, Usher, Missy Elliott and Outkast.

== Honorees ==
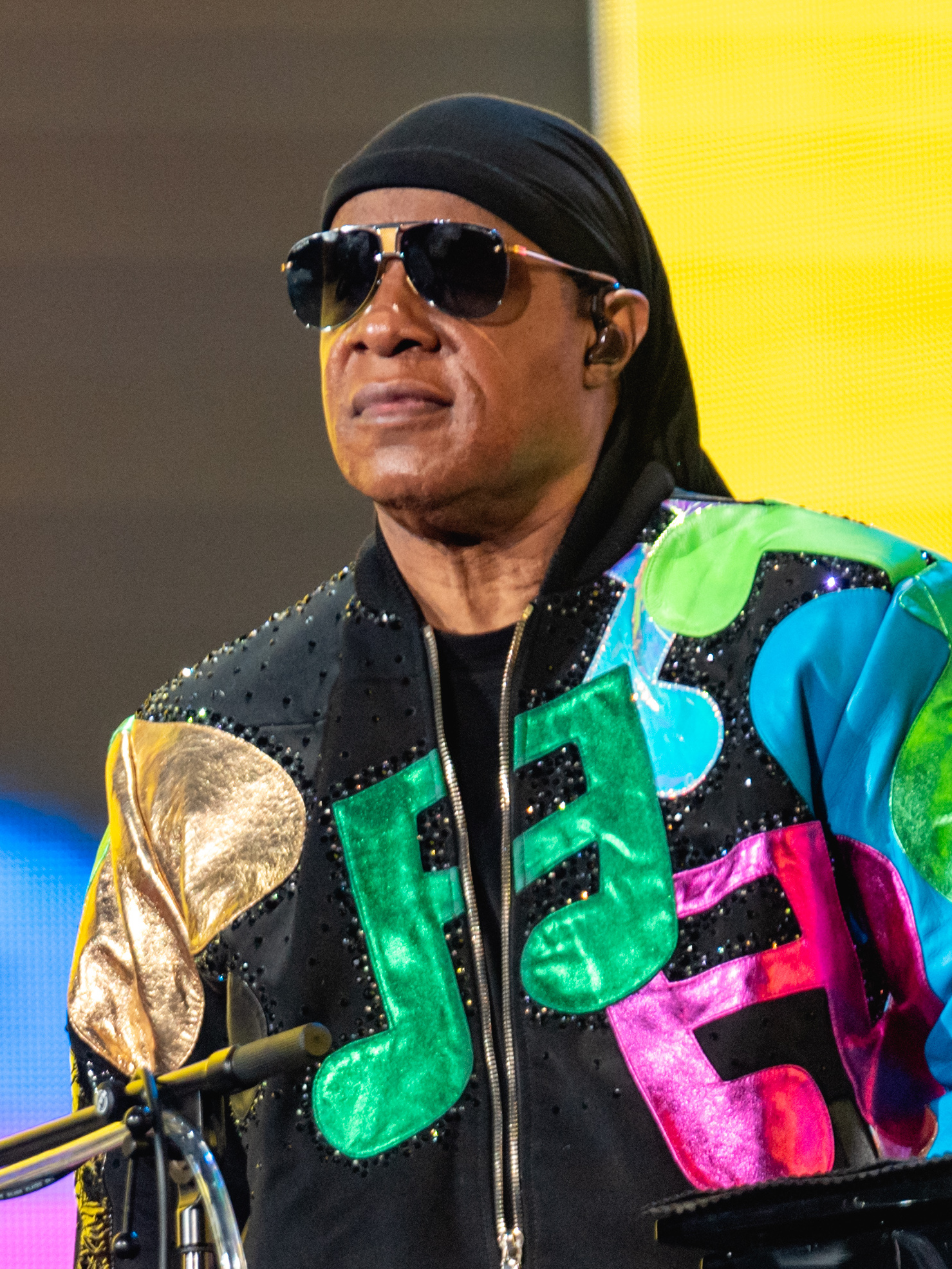
Musician Stevie Wonder was one of the first inductees.

Name	Nationality	Specialty	Date	Ref.
Quincy Jones	United States	Foundational	June 17, 2021	
James Brown	United States	Foundational	June 17, 2021	
Otis Redding	United States	Foundational	June 17, 2021	
Stevie Wonder	United States	Foundational	June 17, 2021	
Michael Jackson	United States	Legacy	June 17, 2021	
Sean Combs	United States	Mainstream mogul	June 17, 2021	
Beyoncé	United States	Mainstream female	June 17, 2021	
Usher	United States	Mainstream male	June 17, 2021	
Missy Elliott	United States	Hip-hop female	June 17, 2021	
Outkast	United States	Hip-hop males	June 17, 2021	
Shirley Caesar	United States	Gospel female	June 17, 2021	
Kirk Franklin	United States	Gospel male	June 17, 2021	
Fela Kuti	Nigeria	International	February 17, 2022	
Smokey Robinson	United States	Foundational	February 17, 2022	
Berry Gordy	United States	Foundational	February 17, 2022	
Cicely Tyson	United States	Foundational	February 17, 2022	
Ray Charles	United States	Foundational	February 17, 2022	
Lionel Richie	United States	Legacy	February 17, 2022	
Tyler Perry	United States	Mainstream mogul	February 17, 2022	
Mary J. Blige	United States	Mainstream female	February 17, 2022	
Prince	United States	Mainstream male (later upgraded to Legacy)	February 17, 2022	
Lauryn Hill	United States	Hip-hop female	February 17, 2022	
Snoop Dogg	United States	Hip-hop male	February 17, 2022	
Yolanda Adams	United States	Gospel female	February 17, 2022	
Donald Lawrence	United States	Gospel male	February 17, 2022	
New Edition	United States	Mainstream Male Group	February 17, 2022	
TLC	United States	Mainstream Female Group	February 17, 2022	
BeBe & CeCe Winans	United States	Gospel Group	February 17, 2022	
Bob Marley	Jamaica	International	June 18, 2022	
Cathy Hughes	United States	Foundational	June 18, 2022	
Duke Ellington	United States	Foundational	June 18, 2022	
Gamble and Huff	United States	Foundational	June 18, 2022	
Run-DMC	United States	Foundational	June 18, 2022	
T. D. Jakes	United States	Foundational	June 18, 2022	
Robert Smith	United States	Foundational	June 18, 2022	
Patti LaBelle	United States	Legacy	June 18, 2022	
Steve Harvey	United States	Mainstream mogul	June 18, 2022	
Angela Bassett	United States	Mainstream female	June 18, 2022	
Charlie Wilson	United States	Mainstream male	June 18, 2022	
Nas	United States	Hip-hop male	June 18, 2022	
Tamela Mann	United States	Gospel female	June 18, 2022	
Donnie McClurkin	United States	Gospel male	June 18, 2022	
The Clark Sisters	United States	Gospel Group	June 18, 2022	
Bobby Jones	United States	Foundational	February 28, 2023	
Andrew Young	United States	Foundational	February 28, 2023	
Danny Glover	United States	Foundational	February 28, 2023	
Dallas Austin	United States	Foundational	October 27, 2023	
Jermaine Dupri	United States	Foundational	October 27, 2023	
Mahalia Jackson	United States	Foundational	October 27, 2023	
Marvin Sapp	United States	Foundational	October 27, 2023	
Magic Johnson	United States	Mainstream mogul	October 27, 2023	
Queen Latifah	United States	Hip-hop female	October 27, 2023	
Busta Rhymes	United States	Hip-hop male	October 27, 2023	
Lil Wayne	United States	Hip-hop male	October 27, 2023	
Davido	Nigeria	International	June 1, 2026	
Ludacris	United States	Hip-Hop Male	June 1, 2026	
Organized Noize	United States	Hip-Hop Duo	June 1, 2026	
Bishop Paul S. Morton	United States	Gospel Singer	June 1, 2026	
Jack the Rapper	United States	Disk Jockey	June 1, 2026	
Maynard H. Jackson	United States	Mainstream Mogul	June 1, 2026	
