= Stellar Awards =

Award for achievements in gospel music

- Current: 41st Annual Stellar Awards
- Awarded for: Outstanding achievements in the gospel music industry
- Country: United States
- Presented by: Stellar Awards Gospel Music Academy (SAGMA) / Central City Productions
- First award: 1984; 42 years ago
- Website: thestellarawards.com

Television/radio coverage
- Network: TV One (2015–2018); BET (2019–present)

A Stellar Award is an award presented by the Stellar Awards Gospel Music Academy (SAGMA) to recognize achievements in the gospel music industry. The annual presentation ceremony features performances by prominent gospel artists, and the presentation of those awards that have a more popular interest. The Stellars were the first major gospel music awards held annually.

The first Stellar Awards ceremony was held on 1984, to honor and respect the musical accomplishments by gospel performers for the year 1983. Following the 2018 ceremony, SAGMA overhauled a few Stellar Award categories for 2019.

== History ==
The first award ceremony was held at Arie Crown Theater in Chicago in 1985. Over the years, the Stellars have been held in various locations including Atlanta, Houston, Los Angeles, Las Vegas, Nashville, and New York. Starting from the 30th Annual Stellar Awards in 2015, the show aired on American digital cable and satellite television network TV One. Starting with the 34th annual ceremony in 2019, the Stellar Awards moved its annual broadcast to BET. The number of awards given has changed over the years with categories being added and removed. The Stellars are produced by Don Jackson's Chicago-based Central City Productions. The production company is also a distributor of original programming to television and cable networks.

In the spring of 2000, Central City Productions changed the voting process by creating the Stellar Awards Gospel Music Academy (SAGMA). SAGMA is currently the official voting body for the Stellar Awards. The Academy is open to artists, gospel industry professionals, radio announcers, record company executives, writers, and educators. In 2020, the awards show was canceled due to the COVID-19 pandemic. The ceremony was aired virtually on August 23, 2020.

== Entry process and selection of nominees ==
Record companies and artists enter recordings and music videos online released during the eligibility period that meet the category requirements. Entries are made online and product is submitted digitally. Once a work is entered, submission go through a screening process. A confidential review committee made up of music industry experts in various fields meet to insure that all entries meet the eligibility criteria, all entries are in the appropriate categories, and are appropriate for the Stellar Awards. Each category is limited based on the dictate and discretion of the review committee. Technical quality, lyrics, voice quality, charting duration, project content and charting performance are reviewed for inclusion on the ballot. All review committee selections are then finalized.

== Final voting ==
The voting process for narrowing down the final nominees consist of two separate ballots. The first round ballot includes eligible entries as determined by the review committee and voted upon by eligible SAGMA members. Top entries for each category from the first ballot move forward to the final ballot. During the final voting process, SAGMA members determine the Stellar Awards nominees and winners. The nominees are announced during a press/radio tour. Once final nominees are determined, some categories are available for public voting through the Fan Favorite Voting period. Selected categories for fan voting changes from year to year.

=== Categories ===
- Artist of the Year
- Song of the Year
- Male Artist of the Year
- Albertina Walker Female Artist of the Year
- Duo/Chorus Group of the Year
- New Artist of the Year
- Album of the Year
- Choir of the Year
- Producer of the Year
- Contemporary Duo/Chorus Group of the Year
- Traditional Duo/Chorus Group of the Year
- Contemporary Male Artist of the Year
- Traditional Male Artist of the Year
- Traditional Female Artist of the Year
- Contemporary Female Artist of the Year
- Contemporary Album of the Year
- Traditional Album of the Year
- Urban/Inspirational Single or Performance of the Year
- Music Video of the Year
- Traditional Choir of the Year
- Contemporary Choir of the Year
- Traditional Artist of the Year
- Special Event Album of the Year
- Rap/Hip Hop Gospel Album of the Year
- Rap/Hip Hop Gospel Song of the Year
- Youth Project of the Year
- Quartet of the Year
- Recorded Music Packaging of Year
- Praise and Worship Album of the Year
- Praise and Worship Song of the Year
- James Cleveland Lifetime Achievement Award

Radio & Internet Station Awards

- Gospel Radio Top Market of the Year
- Gospel Radio Medium Market of the Year
- Gospel Radio Small Market of the Year
- Gospel Radio Internet Station of the Year
- Gospel Announcer of the Year
- Syndicated Gospel Radio Show of the Year

== Ceremonies ==
#	Date	Host(s)	Venue	Ref.
1	1986	Tramaine Hawkins	Arie Crown Theater, Chicago	
2	1987	Al Green; Tramaine Hawkins	Auditorium Theatre, Chicago	
3	1988	The Winans	Christ Universal Temple, Chicago	
4	1989	Wintley Phipps; Tramaine Hawkins; Marvin Winans	Christ Universal Temple, Chicago	
5	1990	Clifton Davis; Marla Gibbs	Aquarius Theater, Los Angeles	
6	1991	Clifton Davis; Marilyn McCoo	Apollo Theater, New York City	
7	1992	Clifton Davis; Marilyn McCoo	Royce Hall, Los Angeles	
8	1993	Clifton Davis; Marilyn McCoo	Royce Hall, Los Angeles	
9	November 1994	Anna Maria Horsford; Clifton Davis	Auditorium Theatre, Chicago	
10	1995	Arnetia Walker; Meshach Taylor	Auditorium Theatre, Chicago	
11	1996	James Avery; Kim Fields; Jonathan Slocumb	Tennessee Performing Arts Center, Nashville	
12	1997	Terrence C. Carson; Jonathan Slocumb; CeCe Winans	Grand Ole Opry House, Nashville	
13	1998	Yolanda Adams; Miguel A. Núñez Jr.	Grand Ole Opry House, Nashville	
14	January 9, 1999	Lynn Whitfield; Steve Harvey; CeCe Winans	Atlanta Civic Center, Atlanta	
15	January 8, 2000	Dr. Bobby Jones; Donnie McClurkin; Vickie Winans	Atlanta Civic Center, Atlanta	
16	January 13, 2001	Ananda Lewis; Vickie Winans; Dr. Bobby Jones; T. D. Jakes	Atlanta Civic Center, Atlanta	
17	January 12, 2002	Yolanda Adams; Donnie McClurkin	Atlanta Civic Center, Atlanta	
18	January 11, 2003	Mary Mary; Donnie McClurkin; Michelle Williams	Atlanta Civic Center, Atlanta	
19	January 10, 2004	Yolanda Adams; Kirk Franklin; Donnie McClurkin	George R. Brown Convention Center, Houston	
20	January 15, 2005	Yolanda Adams; Donnie McClurkin; Tonéx	George R. Brown Convention Center, Houston	
21	January 21, 2006	Israel Houghton; Vickie Winans; Donnie McClurkin	Grand Ole Opry, Nashville	
22	January 13, 2007	Kirk Franklin; Mary Mary; Tye Tribbett	Grand Ole Opry, Nashville	
23	January 12, 2008	Kirk Franklin; CeCe Winans; Byron Cage	Grand Ole Opry, Nashville	
24	January 17, 2009	Dorinda Clark-Cole; Donnie McClurkin; Sinbad	Grand Ole Opry, Nashville	
25	January 16, 2010	Kirk Franklin; Donnie McClurkin; Vickie Winans	Grand Ole Opry, Nashville	
26	January 15, 2011	Donnie McClurkin	Grand Ole Opry, Nashville	
27	January 14, 2012	Dorinda Clark-Cole; Marvin Sapp	Grand Ole Opry, Nashville	
28	January 19, 2013	Mary Mary; Kirk Franklin	Grand Ole Opry, Nashville	
29	January 18, 2014	Sherri Shepherd; Rickey Smiley	Nashville Municipal Auditorium, Nashville	
30	March 28, 2015	Rickey Smiley; David Mann; Tamela Mann	Orleans Arena, Las Vegas	
31	February 20, 2016	Rickey Smiley; Sherri Shepherd	Orleans Arena, Las Vegas	
32	March 25, 2017	Anthony Brown; Erica Campbell	Orleans Arena, Las Vegas	
33	March 24, 2018	Kirk Franklin	Orleans Arena, Las Vegas	
34	March 29, 2019	Kirk Franklin	Orleans Arena, Las Vegas	
35	August 23, 2020	Kirk Franklin; Jonathan McReynolds; Koryn Hawthorne	Virtual ceremony	
36	July 10, 2021	Jekalyn Carr; Tye Tribbett	Schermerhorn Symphony Center, Nashville	
37	July 16, 2022	Jekalyn Carr; Kierra Sheard	Cobb Energy Performing Arts Centre, Atlanta	
38	July 15, 2023	Jonathan McReynolds; Tasha Cobbs Leonard	Orleans Arena, Las Vegas	
39	July 20, 2024	Rickey Smiley; Loni Love	Orleans Arena, Las Vegas	

== See also ==
- List of religion-related awards
