= Kierra Sheard discography =

- Studio albums: 7
- EPs: 3
- Soundtrack albums: 1
- Compilation albums: 4
- Singles: 35
- Remix albums: 1

The discography of American gospel singer Kierra Sheard consists of thirty-five singles (including sixteen as a featured artist), seven studio albums, four compilation albums, one soundtrack album, one remix album, and three extended plays (EPs).

== Albums ==
=== Studio albums ===
| Title | Album details | Peak chart positions | | | | |
| Title | Album details | US | US Gospel | US Christ. | US R&B /HH | JPN |
|---|---|---|---|---|---|---|
| I Owe You | Released: September 7, 2004; Label: EMI Gospel (#EGD 97304); Formats: CD, digital download | 115 | 1 | 4 | 29 | 22 |
| This Is Me | Released: June 27, 2006; Label: EMI Gospel (#EGD324832); Formats: CD, digital download | 90 | 1 | 3 | 16 | 13 |
| Bold Right Life | Released: October 28, 2008; Labels: EMI Gospel (#5099950310326); Formats: CD, digital download | 114 | 3 | 9 | — | 135 |
| Free | Released: October 14, 2011; Labels: EMI Gospel (#5099960649522); Formats: CD, digital download | 40 | 1 | — | — | — |
| Graceland | Released: July 22, 2014; Labels: Karew Records, Motown Gospel (#9941653623); Formats: CD, digital download | 33 | 1 | — | — | — |
| Kierra | Released: April 17, 2020; Labels: Karew Records, RCA Inspiration (#90759-40852); Formats: CD, digital download | 188 | 1 | — | — | — |
| All Yours | Released: March 3, 2023; Labels: Karew Records, RCA Inspiration; Formats: CD, digital download | — | 5 | — | — | — |

=== Remix albums ===
| Title | Album details | Peak chart positions |
| Title | Album details | US Gospel |
|---|---|---|
| Just Until... | Released: August 2, 2005; Label: EMI Gospel (#EGD 74632); Formats: CD, digital download | 10 |

=== Compilation albums ===
| Title | Album details | Peak chart positions |
| Title | Album details | US Gospel |
|---|---|---|
| KiKi's Mixtape | Released: September 22, 2009; Label: EMI Gospel; Formats: CD, digital download | 42 |
| Power Play: 6 Big Hits | Released: January 26, 2010; Label: EMI Gospel; Formats: CD | — |
| My Kierra Sheard Playlist | Released: March 22, 2011; Label: EMI Gospel; Formats: CD, digital download | 38 |
| Icon | Released: October 21, 2016; Label: Karew Records; Formats: CD | — |

=== Soundtrack albums ===
| Title | Album details | Peak chart positions |
| Title | Album details | US Gospel |
|---|---|---|
| The Clark Sisters: First Ladies of Gospel | Released: April 10, 2020; Label: Relevé Entertainment; Formats: Digital download | 8 |

== Extended plays ==
| Title | Album details | Peak chart positions |
| Title | Album details | US Gospel |
|---|---|---|
| This is Me | Released: May 23, 2006; Labels: Motown Gospel; Formats: CD, digital download | — |
| LED | Released: November 20, 2015; Labels: Karew Records; Formats: CD, digital download | 3 |
| A Karew Family Christmas | Released: November 22, 2018; Labels: Karew Records; Formats: Digital download | — |

== Singles ==
=== As lead artist ===
| Title | Year | Peak chart positions | | | Album |
| Title | Year | US Gospel | US R&B /HH | JPN | Album |
|---|---|---|---|---|---|
| "You Don't Know" | 2004 | 14 | 84 | — | I Owe You |
| "Let Go" | 2004 | — | — | — | I Owe You |
| "Why Me?" | 2006 | 6 | — | — | This is Me |
| "Won't Hold Back" | 2008 | — | — | — | Bold Right Life |
| "Praise Him Now" | 2008 | 7 | — | — | Bold Right Life |
| "Love Like Crazy" | 2009 | — | — | 7 | Bold Right Life |
| "Mighty" (featuring BRL) | 2011 | 28 | — | — | Free |
| "You Are" (featuring BRL) | 2011 | 17 | — | — | Free |
| "Indescribable" (featuring BRL) | 2011 | 15 | — | — | Free |
| "Trumpets Blow" | 2013 | — | — | — | Non-album single |
| "2nd Win" | 2014 | 15 | — | — | Graceland |
| "Flaws" | 2015 | 15 | — | — | Graceland |
| "Don't Judge Me" | 2019 | 13 | — | — | Kierra |
| "It Keeps Happening" | 2020 | 4 | — | — | Kierra |
| "Something Has To Break" (featuring Tasha Cobbs Leonard) | 2020 | 5 | — | — | Kierra |
| "Something Has To Break" (featuring Karen Clark Sheard) | 2021 | 21 | — | — | Non-album single |
| "Something Has To Break" (with Red Rocks Worship and Essential Worship) | 2021 | — | — | — | Things of Heaven |
| "Miracles" (Kierra Sheard featuring Pastor Mike Jr.) | 2022 | 8 | — | — | All Yours |
| "Praise Through" | 2023 | — | — | — | All Yours |

=== As featured artist ===
| Title | Year | Peak chart positions | | | | | | Certifications | Album |
| Title | Year | US | US Gospel | US Christ. | US Adult R&B | US R&B /HH | US Dance | Certifications | Album |
|---|---|---|---|---|---|---|---|---|---|
| "God in Me" (Mary Mary featuring Kierra Sheard) | 2008 | 68 | 1 | — | 8 | 5 | 1 | | The Sound |
| "Are You Listening" (Kirk Franklin Presents Artists United For Haiti – BeBe Winans, Bishop Paul S. Morton, CeCe Winans, Donnie McClurkin, Dorinda Clark-Cole, Fred Hammond, J Moss, Jeremy Camp, Karen Clark-Sheard, Kierra Sheard, Marvin Sapp, Marvin Winans, Mary Mary, Natalie Grant, Shirley Caesar, Smokie Norful, Yolanda Adams) | 2010 | — | 8 | — | 26 | 28 | — | | Non-album single |
| "Put a Praise On It" (Tasha Cobbs Leonard featuring Kierra Sheard) | 2015 | — | 1 | — | — | — | — | | One Place Live |
| "My City" (Deitrick Haddon featuring J. Moss, Kierra Sheard, 21:03, Karen Clark Sheard, Fred Hammond, Clareta Haddon, Dorinda Clark Cole, Kem, Shelby 5) | 2015 | — | — | — | — | — | — | | TIME (Truth Is My Energy) |
| "Hang On" (GEI featuring Kierra Sheard) | 2016 | — | 3 | — | — | — | — | | GEI Live |
| "All Glory" (Matt Redman featuring Kierra Sheard) | 2017 | — | — | — | — | — | — | | Glory Song |
| "Your Spirit" (Tasha Cobbs Leonard featuring Kierra Sheard) | 2017 | — | 14 | — | — | — | — | RIAA: Platinum | Heart. Passion. Pursuit. |
| "Salute" (Enkay featuring Kierra Sheard) | 2018 | — | — | — | — | — | — | | The Bridge |
| "Do It Again" (Elevation Collective featuring Travis Greene & Kierra Sheard) | 2018 | — | 14 | 1 | — | — | — | | Evidence |
| "Optimistic - The Remix" (August Greene featuring Kirk Franklin, BJ the Chicago Kid, Kierra Sheard) | 2018 | — | — | — | — | — | — | | Optimistic (The Remix) |
| "Showing Off" (Sir the Baptist featuring Kierra Sheard, Donald Lawrence, NotKarlton Banks, Krystal Lee) | 2019 | — | — | — | — | — | — | | Godfidence: Kingdom Bae |
| "Come Together" (Rodney "Darkchild" Jerkins featuring Tim Bowman Jr., Joy Enriquez, Kirk Franklin, Kelontae Gavin, Fred Hammond, Heavenly Joy, Le'Andria Johnson, Lecrae, Mary Mary, Jac Ross, Marvin Sapp, Karen Clark Sheard, Kierra Sheard and Shelby 5) | 2020 | — | — | — | — | — | — | | Non-album single |
| "Even if it Takes Forever" (Jojo Martin featuring Kierra Sheard) | 2020 | — | — | — | — | — | — | | Temporary Tears |
| "No Weapon" (Nick Cannon featuring Kierra Sheard) | 2021 | — | — | — | — | — | — | | Non-album singles |
| "We Will Never Forget" (Omarion featuring Lalah Hathaway and Kierra Sheard) | 2021 | — | — | — | — | — | — | | Non-album singles |
| "Something To Believe In" (Dante Bowe featuring Kierra Sheard & the Apartment) | 2021 | — | — | — | — | — | — | | Non-album singles |

== Other charted songs ==
| Title | Year | Peak chart positions | Album |
| Title | Year | US Gospel | Album |
|---|---|---|---|
| "That Thing" | 2005 | 30 | Just Until... |
| "Save Me" | 2014 | 20 | Graceland |

== Guest appearances ==
| Title | Year | Album |
|---|---|---|
| "The Will of God" (Karen Clark-Sheard featuring Kierra Sheard) | 1997 | Finally Karen |
| "Sacrifice" (Karen Clark-Sheard featuring Kierra Sheard) | 2002 | 2nd Chance |
| "Don't Nobody Know" (Ramiyah featuring Kierra Sheard, Dorinda Clark-Cole, Karen Clark-Sheard) | 2003 | Ramiyah |
| "Look Up" (Tye Tribbett & G.A.) | 2008 | Stand Out |
| "Hark The Herald Angels Sing" (The Clark Sisters featuring Kierra Sheard) | 2009 | The Clark Sisters' Family Christmas |
| "Beautiful Christmas" (The Clark Sisters featuring Kierra Sheard) | 2009 | The Clark Sisters' Family Christmas |
| "Lord Take Me" (Karen Clark-Sheard featuring Kierra Sheard, Angel Chisholm) | 2010 | All in One |
| "The Greatest" (James Fortune featuring Kierra Sheard) | 2010 | Encore |
| "The Greatest" (James Fortune featuring Kierra Sheard) | 2010 | I Believe Live |
| "Nearer My God To Thee" (Kierra Sheard) | 2012 | How Great Thou Art: Timeless Hymns - Modern Voices |
| "For Me" (Zacardi Cortez featuring Kierra "KiKi" Sheard) | 2012 | The Introduction |
| "Good Day" (J Moss featuring Kierra Sheard & Karen Clark Sheard) | 2012 | V4...The Other Side |
| "The Greatest" (James Fortune & FIYA featuring Kierra Sheard) | 2013 | The Experience |
| "So Glad" (Isaac Carree featuring Kierra Sheard, Kirk Franklin, Lecrae) | 2013 | Reset |
| "This Day" (Kierra Sheard) | 2013 | BMI Trailblazers of Gospel Music Live 2013 |
| "For Me" (Zacardi Cortez featuring Kierra Sheard) | 2014 | Reloaded |
| "Angels We Have Heard On High" (Chrisette Michele & Kierra Sheard) | 2014 | Motown Christmas |
| "Put A Praise On It" (Tasha Cobbs Leonard featuring Kierra Sheard) | 2015 | One Place Live |
| "We Wish You a Merry Christmas" (Detail featuring Lil George, Kierra Sheard) | 2015 | Noel |
| "Interlude" (Marc Jay & The J Crew Band featuring Kierra Sheard) | 2016 | I Am God |
| "Better Than I Found It" (Danny Gokey featuring Kierra Sheard) | 2017 | Rise |
| "I Wouldn't Love Me" (James Fortune featuring Kierra Sheard) | 2017 | Dear Future Me |
| "We Want You" (Degen featuring Kierra Sheard) | 2017 | Progression of Destiny |
| "Your Spirit" (Tasha Cobbs Leonard featuring Kierra Sheard) | 2017 | Heart. Passion. Pursuit. |
| "Worth It" (Lecrae featuring Kierra Sheard, Jawan Harris) | 2017 | All Things Work Together |
| "All Glory" (Matt Redman featuring Kierra Sheard) | 2017 | Glory Song |
| "More of You" (Earnest Pugh featuring Kierra Sheard, Sarge) | 2017 | SURVIVE |
| "Salute" (Enkay featuring Kierra Sheard) | 2018 | The Bridge |
| "Look at Me Now" (Jor'dan Armstrong featuring Kierra Sheard) | 2018 | Blsd |
| "I Got You (Always and Forever)" (Chance the Rapper featuring En Vogue, Ari Lennox, Kierra Sheard) | 2019 | The Big Day |
| "Showing Off" (Sir the Baptist featuring Kierra Sheard, Donald Lawrence, NotKarlton Banks, Krystal Lee) | 2020 | Godfidence: Kingdom Bae |
| "Miracle Worker" (JJ Hairston featuring Kierra Sheard) | 2021 | Not Holding Back |
| "Come a Little Closer" (Todd Dulaney featuring Kierra Sheard) | 2021 | Anthems & Glory |
| "Somehow" (Travis Greene featuring Kierra Sheard) | 2021 | Oil + Water |
| "Counting My Blessings" (Eric Bellinger featuring Kierra Sheard) | 2021 | New Light |
| "Now Here" (Red Rocks Worship featuring Kierra Sheard) | 2021 | Things of Heaven |
| "Something Has to Break" (Red Rocks Worship featuring Kierra Sheard) | 2021 | Things of Heaven |
| "We Need You" (Tye Tribbett featuring Kierra Sheard and Mali Music) | 2022 | All Things New |
| "Going Going" (Tennessee State University featuring ChurchPpl, Dubba-AA, Sir the Baptist and Kierra Sheard) | 2022 | The Urban Hymnal |
| "RAIN DOWN ON ME" (GloRilla featuring Kirk Franklin, Maverick City Music, Kierra Sheard, Chandler Moore) | 2024 | GLORIOUS |

=== Soundtrack appearances ===
| Title | Year | Album |
|---|---|---|
| "U.S.A." (Karen Clark-Sheard, Kierra Sheard, Bryson Camper, Harmonious Gospel Choir) | 2021 | Harmonious: Globally Inspired Music from the EPCOT Nighttime Spectacular |
