= Karen Clark Sheard discography =

The following is the discography of Karen Clark Sheard.

== Albums ==
=== Studio and live albums ===
Title	Album details	Chart positions				Sales
Title	Album details	US	US R&B /HH	US Gospel	US Christ.	Sales
Finally Karen	Released: November 4, 1997; Label: Island (#524397)	—	28	2	—	US: 400,000
2nd Chance	Released: July 30, 2002; Label: Elektra (#62767)	82	27	2	3	
The Heavens Are Telling	Released: November 4, 2003; Label: Elektra (#62894)	188	44	3	11	
It's Not Over	Released: January 24, 2006; Label: Word (#WD 2886379)	124	—	4	—	
All in One	Released: April 6, 2010; Label: Karew (#93736)	98	—	3	—	
Destined to Win	Released: July 17, 2015; Label: eOne (#9376)	20	—	2	—	
Still Karen	Released: August 23, 2024; Label: Karew	—	—	9	—	

== Singles ==
=== As a lead artist ===
List of singles, as lead artist, with selected chart positions, showing year released and album name
Year	Title	Peak chart positions		Album
Year	Title	US Gospel	US Adult R&B	Album
"Balm in Gilead"	1997	—	—	Finally Karen
"Brand New Day" (featuring Yolanda Adams)	2002	—	—	2nd Chance
"Be Sure"	2002	—	39	2nd Chance
"You Loved Me" (featuring Kierra Sheard)	2003	—	—	The Heavens Are Telling
"We Acknowledge You"	2003	—	—	The Heavens Are Telling
"Favor"	2006	25	—	It's Not Over
"You Showed Me"	2007	18	—	It's Not Over
"Prayed Up"	2010	9	—	All in One
"He Knows" (featuring Dorinda Clark-Cole)	2010	14	—	All in One
"Sunday A.M."	2014	17	—	Destined to Win
"My Words Have Power" (featuring Donald Lawrence & The Co.)	2015	10	—	Destined to Win
"Send It Down"	2023	14	—	Still Karen
"Yes"	2024	—	—	Still Karen
"Look at Me"	2024	—	—	Still Karen
"I Won't Complain"	2024	—	—	Still Karen
"Thank You for Everything" (with Kirk Franklin)	2026	4	—	I Am What I Am

=== As featured artist ===
List of singles as featured artist, with selected chart positions, showing year released and album name
Year	Title	Peak chart positions			Album
Year	Title	US Gospel	US Adult R&B	US R&B /HH	Album
"Lift Every Voice and Sing" (Melba Moore & Friends)	1990	—	—	9	Soul Exposed
"Wait on the Lord" (Donnie McClurkin featuring Karen Clark Sheard)	2009	2	40	—	We All Are One (Live in Detroit)
"Something Has to Break" (Kierra Sheard featuring Karen Clark Sheard)	2021	21	—	—	Kierra
"God Is Good" (Stanley Brown featuring Karen Clark Sheard, Hezekiah Walker and Kierra Sheard)	2023	— (Note: "God Is Good" did not enter the US Billboard Hot Gospel Songs chart, but peaked at number 25 on the US Gospel Airplay chart.)	—	—	Non-album single

=== Promotional singles ===
List of promotional singles, with selected chart positions, showing year released and album name
Title	Year	Peak chart positions	Albums
Title	Year	US Adult R&B	Albums
"Nothing Without You" (Karen Clark Sheard featuring Faith Evans)	1998	27	Finally Karen

=== Other charted songs ===
Title	Year	Peak chart positions		Album
Title	Year	US Gospel	US Gospel Digital Sales	Album
"My God is Big"	2015	—	23	Destined to Win
"Completely Yours"	2024	17	—	Still Karen

== Other ==
This section documents Karen Clark Sheard's featured solo appearances. For The Clark Sisters' appearances, visit this section.

Year	Title	Artist	Album	Label
1976	"If My People Which Are Called By My Name"	Mattie Moss Clark featuring Karen Clark	He Was Hung Up for My Hangups	Sound Of Gospel
1976	"Everything Will Be Alright"	Mattie Moss Clark featuring Karen Clark	He Was Hung Up for My Hangups	Sound Of Gospel
1976	"Christ Is Coming Back Again"	Mattie Moss Clark featuring Karen Clark	He Was Hung Up for My Hangups	Sound Of Gospel
1976	"Come I'll Give You Rest"	Mattie Moss Clark featuring Karen Clark	He Was Hung Up for My Hangups	Sound Of Gospel
1993	"The Grass Withereth"	Karen Clark Sheard	Thomas Whitfield: A Tribute to "The Maestro"	Benson/A&M
1996	"Don't Give Up"	Island Inspirational All-Stars featuring Kirk Franklin, Karen Clark Sheard, Hezekiah Walker, and Donald Lawrence	Don't Be a Menace to South Central While Drinking Your Juice in the Hood (Soundtrack)	Island
1996	"Act Like You Know"	LaShun Pace featuring Karen Clark Sheard	A Wealthy Place	Savoy
1996	"I Won't Complain"	FAMU Gospel Choir featuring Karen Clark Sheard	Twinkie Clark Terrell presents FAMU Gospel Choir	Crystal Rose
2000	"God's Favor"	Tri-City Singers featuring Karen Clark Sheard, Kim Burrell, and Kelly Price	Tri-City4.com	EMI Gospel
2001	"Fo Sho'"	Yolanda Adams featuring Karen Clark Sheard	Believe	Elektra
2001	"King"	Darwin Hobbs & Karen Clark Sheard	Boycott (Soundtrack)	EMI Gospel
2002	"Christ Is Coming Back Again"	Twinkie Clark featuring Karen Clark-Sheard	Live In Charlotte N.C.	Verity
2002	"Fatal Attraction"	Karen Clark Sheard	T.D. Jakes Presents: God's Leading Ladies (Various Artists)	Dexterity Sounds/EMI Gospel
2002	"Show Me the Way"	Dorinda Clark Cole featuring The Clark Sisters	Dorinda Clark Cole	GospoCentric
2004	"Don't Nobody Know"	Ramiyah featuring Karen Clark Sheard, Kierra KiKi Sheard, & Dorinda Clark Cole	Ramiyah	Sony Music Entertainment
2005	"Blessing Me"	Jacky Clark Chisholm featuring The Clark Sisters	Expectancy	Entheos records
2006	"Wrong Things"	Kierra Sheard (backing vocals by Karen Clark Sheard)	This Is Me	EMI Gospel
2006	"Jesus Is Lord"	Andrae Crouch feat. Karen Clark Sheard	Mighty Wind	Verity
2007	"Know Him"	J Moss featuring Karen Clark Sheard	V2	Gospocentric
2007	"Can't Nobody	Bobby Jones featuring Karen Clark Sheard	The Ambassador	Gospocentric
2008	"It Will All Be Worth It"	Mary Mary featuring Gospel Legends	The Sound	Columbia
2009	"Wait On the Lord"	Donnie McClurkin	We All Are One: Live in Detroit	Verity
2009	"Lord You Are My Everything"	Byron Cage featuring Karen Clark Sheard & Marvin Winans	Faithful to Believe!	GospoCentric
2013	"The First Noel"	Mary J. Blige featuring The Clark Sisters	A Mary Christmas	Verve
2014	"Awe of You"	J.J Harriston & Youthful Praise featuring Karen Clark Shears	I See Victory	Light
