= PAJAM =

American songwriting and production team

PAJAM is an American songwriting and production team, made up of Paul Allen, J. Moss and Walter Kearney, all of Detroit, Michigan. The team works with gospel, soul and R&B artists.

They are best known for their work on the 1997 debut album Finally Karen recorded by Karen Clark Sheard, which reached #2 on the U.S. Billboard Gospel Albums chart.

Subsequently, PAJAM has worked with over 50 artists, including Marvin Sapp, Byron Cage, Kierra "Kiki" Sheard, Winans Phase II, Trin-i-tee 5:7, 21:03, and Hezekiah Walker, as well as secular artists such as Kelly Price, Boyz II Men, Dru Hill, Patti LaBelle and NSYNC.

== Production discography ==
=== 1997 ===
- Karen Clark Sheard - Finally Karen
  - "Praise Festival"
  - "Unconditional (Mad Love)"
  - "Gotta Right..."
  - "Can't Take It"

=== 1998 ===
- 7 Mile - 7 Mile
- Dawkins & Dawkins - Focus
  - "Child of God"
  - "Not Just Anybody"
- Greg O'Quin 'N Joyful Noyze - Conversations
  - "Know You"
  - "That Name"
  - "Dry Your Eyes"
  - "Never"

=== 1999 ===
- Angelo & Veronica - Change
- Hezekiah Walker & the Love Fellowship Crusade Choir - Family Affair
  - "Let's Dance"
  - "He Can"
  - "More Like Him"
  - "Give'em Your Life"
- Marvin Sapp - Nothing Else Matters
  - "Do Your Dance"
  - "Thank You Lord"
- Men of Standard - Feels Like Rain
  - "Nothing Like Heaven"
  - "God Take Care of Me"
  - "Feels Like Rain"
- The Mighty Clouds of Joy - It Was You
  - "Never Say"
  - "Miracle"
- Nancey Jackson - Relationships
  - "Relationship"
  - "Delicate Heart"
- Winans Phase 2 - We Got Next

=== 2000 ===
- Kelly Price - Mirror Mirror
  - "You Should've Told Me"

=== 2001 ===
- Sisqó - Return of Dragon
  - "Without You"
- *NSYNC - Celebrity
  - "Do Your Thing"

=== 2002 ===
- 3rd Storee - Get With Me
  - "Now I Can Breathe"
  - "I'm Sorry"
  - "Don't Lose Hope"
  - "How Can This Be"
- Boyz II Men - Full Circle
  - "I'll Show You"
- Dorinda Clark-Cole - Dorinda Clark-Cole
  - "No Not One"
  - "It's Not Me"
  - "You Can"
  - "You Need Him"
- Dru Hill - Dru World Order
  - "Old Love"
- Hezekiah Walker & the Love Fellowship Crusade Choir - Family Affair II: Live at Radio City Music Hall
  - "Don't Wait"
  - "Breakthrough"
- Karen Clark Sheard - 2nd Chance
  - "Be Sure"
  - "So Good"
  - "2nd Chance"
- The Mighty Clouds of Joy - I Want to Thank You
  - "Seeking the Fire"
  - "New Creature"
- Pam & Dodi - Pam & Dodi
  - "There All the Time"
- Trin-i-tee 5:7 - The Kiss
  - "Holla"
  - "Holla (Urban Remix)"
- Vanessa Williams - Vanessa
  - "Think Again"

=== 2003 ===
- Karen Clark Sheard - The Heavens Are Telling
  - "Go Ahead" featuring Missy Elliott
  - "Praise Up"
  - "I Owe"
  - "Sometimes"
  - "Don't Change" featuring Kierra Kiki Sheard
- Percy Bady - The Percy Bady Experience
  - "Free"
  - "Hold Up the Light (Urban Remix)"
- The Straight Gate Mass Choir - Expectations: I'll Raise
  - "Jumpstart"
  - "Work Your Faith"
- Virtue - Free
  - "Thankful"
  - "You'll Win If You Try"
  - "He's Able"

=== 2004 ===
- J. Moss - The J. Moss Project (album producers)
- Kierra Kiki Sheard - I Owe You
  - "Church Nite"
  - "Closer"
  - "Praise Offering"
  - "So Long"
- Michelle Williams - Do You Know
  - "The Way of Love"
- Patti LaBelle - Timeless Journey
  - "More Than Material"
- Ramiyah - Ramiyah (album producers)
- Vanessa Williams - Here I Go Again!

=== 2005 ===
- Byron Cage - An Invitation to Worship (album producers)

=== 2006 ===
- 21:03 - PAJAM Presents 21:03 (album producers)
- Antwaun Stanley - I Can Do Anything (album producers)
- Dave Hollister - The Book of David, Vol. 1: The Transition
  - "Pray (Til I Get an Answer)"
- Karen Clark Sheard - It's Not Over
  - "Be Blessed"
  - "You Showed Me"
- Kierra Sheard - This Is Me
  - "Wrong Things"
  - "Scream"
- Patti LaBelle - The Gospel According to Patti LaBelle
  - "More Than (He Loves You)" featuring J. Moss

=== 2007 ===
- Bobby Jones - The Ambassador
  - "Thank You Lord"
  - "Call Him Up Love Peace & Joy"
- Byron Cage - Live at the Apollo: The Proclamation (album producers)
- Darlene McCoy - Darlene McCoy
  - "If There Were No You"
- J. Moss - V2... (album producers)
- PAJAM Presents Sing To The Lord (album producers)
- Vanessa Bell Armstrong - Walking Miracle
  - "Seasons"

=== 2008 ===
- 21:03 - Total Attention (album producers)
- Dorinda Clark-Cole - Take It Back
  - "Return"
- Kierra Kiki Sheard - Bold Right Life
  - "Praise Him Now"

=== 2009 ===
- Crystal Aikin - Crystal Aikin
  - "What If"
- J. Moss - Just James (album producers)
- Melinda Watts - People Get Ready
  - "Happy"
- Shirley Caesar - A City Called Heaven
  - "Nobody"

=== 2010 ===
- J. Moss - Remixed, Rare & Unreleashed (album producers)
- Karen Clark Sheard - All in One
  - "I Made a Choice"
  - "Good"
  - "Because of You"
  - "What He Did"
  - "He Knows"
  - "All For One"
- Y'Anna - The Promise
  - "I'm Blessed"

=== 2011 ===
- 21:03 - Evolved: From Boys to Men (album producers)

=== 2012 ===
- James Fortune & FIYA - Identity
  - "Throw My Hands Up"
- J. Moss - V4...The Other Side (album producers)

=== 2013 ===
- Earnest Pugh - The W.I.N. (Worship In Nassau) Experience
  - "I Believe You Most"
