= 2005 Soul Train Music Awards =

Music awards ceremony in Los Angeles, US

Soul Train Music Awards
- Date: March 12, 2005
- Location: Paramount Studios, Los Angeles, California
- Country: United States
- Hosted by: Brian McKnight, Fantasia, Nick Cannon and Nicole Richie
- First award: 1987

Highlights
- Most awards: Usher (5)
- Website: soultrain.com

Television/radio coverage
- Network: BET

The 2005 Soul Train Music Awards were held on March 12, 2005, at the Paramount Studios in Los Angeles, California. The show was hosted by Brian McKnight, Fantasia, Nick Cannon and Nicole Richie.

== Special awards ==
=== Quincy Jones Award for Outstanding Career Achievements ===
- Ice Cube

=== Sammy Davis, Jr. Award for "Entertainer of the Year" – Male ===
- Usher

=== Sammy Davis, Jr. Award for "Entertainer of the Year" – Female ===
- Ciara

== Winners and nominees ==
Winners are in bold text.

=== Best R&B/Soul Album – Male ===
- **Usher – Confessions**
  - R. Kelly – Happy People/U Saved Me
  - Musiq – Soulstar
  - Prince – Musicology

=== Best R&B/Soul Album – Female ===
- **Alicia Keys – The Diary of Alicia Keys**
  - Brandy – Afrodisiac
  - Ciara – Goodies
  - Jill Scott – Beautifully Human: Words and Sounds Vol. 2

=== Best R&B/Soul Album – Group, Band or Duo ===
- **Destiny's Child – Destiny Fulfilled**
  - 112 – Hot & Wet
  - Boyz II Men – Throwback, Vol. 1
  - New Edition – One Love

=== Best R&B/Soul Single – Male ===
- **Usher – "Confessions Part II"**
  - Anthony Hamilton – "Charlene"
  - Mario – "Let Me Love You"
  - Prince – "Call My Name"

=== Best R&B/Soul Single – Female ===
- **Alicia Keys – "If I Ain't Got You"**
  - Fantasia - "Truth Is"
  - Ciara (featuring Petey Pablo) – "Goodies"
  - Jill Scott – "Golden"

=== Best R&B/Soul Single – Group, Band or Duo ===
- **Usher and Alicia Keys – "My Boo"**
  - Destiny's Child – "Lose My Breath"
  - New Edition – "Hot 2Nite"
  - Crime Mob (featuring Lil Scrappy) – "Knuck If You Buck"

=== The Michael Jackson Award for Best R&B/Soul or Rap Music Video ===
- **Jay Z – "99 Problems"**
  - OutKast – "Roses"
  - Usher (featuring Ludacris and Lil' Jon) – "Yeah!"
  - Kanye West – "Jesus Walks"

=== The Coca-Cola Classic Award for Best R&B/Soul or Rap New Artist ===
- **Ciara**
  - Fantasia
  - J-Kwon
  - John Legend

=== The Sprite Award for Best R&B/Soul or Rap Dance Cut ===
- **Usher (featuring Ludacris and Lil' Jon) – "Yeah!"**
  - Ciara (featuring Petey Pablo) – "Goodies"
  - Snoop Dogg (featuring Pharrell) – "Drop It Like It's Hot"
  - LL Cool J – "Headsprung"

=== Best Gospel Album ===
- **Israel and New Breed – Live From Another Level**
  - Karen Clark-Sheard – The Heavens Are Telling
  - J Moss – The J Moss Project
  - Kierra "Kiki" Sheard – I Owe You

== Performers ==
- Anthony Hamilton
- Brian McKnight
- Ciara and Petey Pablo
- Fantasia
- Kierra "Kiki" Sheard
- Karen Clark Sheard
- Nick Cannon
- J-Kwon, Petey Pablo and Ebony Eyess
