= Tina Campbell discography =

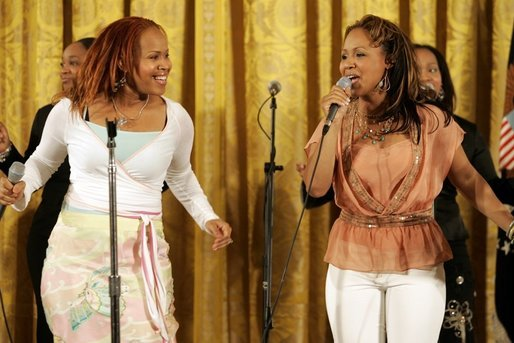
- Studio albums: 2
- EPs: 1
- Compilation albums: 1
- Singles: 10

American gospel singer Tina Campbell has released two studio albums, one compilation album, and ten singles.

== Albums ==
=== Studio albums ===
List of studio albums, with selected chart positions
| Title | Album details | Peak chart positions | | |
| Title | Album details | US | US Gospel | US Indie |
|---|---|---|---|---|
| It's Personal | Released: May 21, 2015; Label: Gee Tree Creative; Digital download | 90 | 1 | 10 |

=== Collaborative albums ===
| Title | Album details |
|---|---|
| Christmas at Our House (with Teddy Campbell) | Released: December 9, 2022; Label: Gee Tree Creative; Digital download, online streaming |

=== Compilation albums ===
List of studio albums, with selected chart positions
| Title | Album details | Peak chart positions | |
| Title | Album details | US Gospel | US Indie |
|---|---|---|---|
| It's Still Personal | Released: September 29, 2017; Label: Gee Tree Creative; CD, digital download, online streaming | 7 | 35 |

== Singles ==
| Title | Year | Chart positions | | | Album |
| Title | Year | US Gospel | US Digital Gospel | US Gospel Airplay | Album |
|---|---|---|---|---|---|
| "Destiny" | 2015 | 15 | 1 | 13 | It's Personal |
| "I'll Wait" | 2015 | — | 22 | — | It's Personal |
| "Love Love Love" (featuring Stevie Wonder) | 2015 | — | 25 | — | It's Personal |
| "Speak the Word" (featuring Teddy Campbell) | 2016 | 24 | — | 15 | It's Personal |
| "Too Hard Not To" | 2017 | 20 | 2 | 12 | It's Still Personal |
| "We Livin'" | 2017 | — | 17 | 15 | It's Still Personal |
| "21" | 2021 | — | — | — | Christmas at Our House |
| "Remember Jesus" (featuring Brian Courtney Wilson, Marvin Winans, CeCe Winans, and Natalie Grant) | 2022 | — | — | — | Christmas at Our House |
| "Our House" | 2022 | — | — | — | Christmas at Our House |
| "Pray For Me" | 2024 | — | — | 1 | Non-album single |

== Songwriting credits ==
This list does not include songs recorded by Tina Campbell or Mary Mary
| Title | Year | Artist(s) | Album |
|---|---|---|---|
| "Praisin' On My Mind" | 1998 | Dawkins & Dawkins | Focus |
| "Louis" | 1998 | Wayman Tisdale | Decisions |
| "What More Can He Do" | 1999 | 702 | 702 |
| "Time to Change" | 1999 | Yolanda Adams | Mountain High... Valley Low |
| "Yeah" | 1999 | Yolanda Adams | Mountain High... Valley Low |
| "Anything" | 2001 | Yolanda Adams | Believe |
| "Let Go" | 2004 | Kierra Sheard | I Owe You |
| "All I Am" | 2004 | Kierra Sheard | I Owe You |
| "Done Did It" | 2004 | Kierra Sheard | I Owe You |
| "You" | 2006 | Kierra Sheard | This Is Me |
| "Everybody" | 2006 | Men of Standard | Surround |
| "Wave Your Banner" | 2008 | Kierra Sheard | Bold Right Life |
| "Love Like Crazy" | 2008 | Kierra Sheard | Bold Right Life |
| "Love Somebody" | 2008 | Spensha Baker | Outloud! |
| "A Little More Jesus" | 2014 | Erica Campbell | Help |
| "The Atkins House" | 2014 | Erica Campbell | Help |

== See also ==
- Mary Mary discography
