= Why Me =

Why Me or Why Me? may refer to:

== Music ==
- "Why Me" (Kris Kristofferson song), 1973
- "Why Me" (Styx song), 1979
- "Why Me?" (Irene Cara song), 1983
- "Why Me?" (Linda Martin song), 1992
- "Why Me" (PJ & Duncan song), 1994
- "Why Me?" (Kierra Sheard song), 2006
- "Why Me", a 1983 song by Planet P Project
- "Why Me?", a 1988 song by Mike + The Mechanics from the album Living Years
- "Why Me?", a 1992 song by Delbert McClinton from the album Never Been Rocked Enough
- "Why Me?", a 1994 song by A House
- "Why Me?", a 2000 song by Cuban Link
- "Why Me?", a 2008 song by Ice Cube from Raw Footage
- Why Me? (album), a 2000 live album by Daniel Johnston

== Film and television ==
- Why Me? (1978 film), a 1978 animated short film by Janet Perlman
- Why Me? (1984 film), a TV film directed by Fielder Cook starring Glynnis O'Connor and Armand Assante
- Why Me? (1985 film), a Hong Kong film directed by Kent Cheng
- Why Me? (1990 film), a film directed by Gene Quintano
- Why Me? (2015 film), a Romanian film

== See also ==
- "Why Me?" an article written by Jodie Foster for Esquire, published on the December 1982 issue
- Who Me (disambiguation)
