= Fatal Attraction (disambiguation) =

Fatal Attraction is a 1987 American psychological thriller film directed by Adrian Lyne.

Fatal Attraction or Fatal Attractions may also refer to:

== Television ==
- Fatal Attractions (TV program), a 2010–2013 American nature documentary program that aired on Animal Planet
- Fatal Attraction (2013 TV program), an American true-crime documentary program broadcast on TV One that debuted in 2013
- Fatal Attraction (2023 TV series), a 2023 American miniseries based on the 1987 film
- "Fatal Attraction", an episode of Jake and the Fatman series
- "Fatal Attraction" (Falcon Crest), a 1986 episode
- "Fatal Attraction" (The Upper Hand), a 1995 episode

== Music ==
- Fatal Attraction, a 1984 album by Adam Bomb
- Fatal Attraction, a 1990 album by Killer
- "Fatal Attraction", a song by Roxanne Shanté from the 1989 album Bad Sister
- "Fatal Attraction", a song by Anjulie from the 2009 self-titled debut album Anjulie
- "Fatal Attraction", a song by Mark Stewart from the 1987 eponymous album Mark Stewart
- "Fatal Attraction", a song by Karen Clark Sheard from the 2002 compilation album T.D. Jakes Presents: God's Leading Ladies
- "Fatal Attraction", a song by Tone Lōc from the 1991 album Cool Hand Lōc
- "Fatal Attraction", a song by Mumzy Stranger from the 2010 album Journey Begins
- “Fatal Attraction”, a song by Kevin Gates from the 2019 album I'm Him
- "Fatal Attraction", a song by 6lack from the 2023 album Since I Have a Lover

== Other uses ==
- Fatal Attractions (comics), 1993 Marvel Comics crossover storyline centered on the X-Men
- Fatal Attraction (play), a 2014 play based on the 1987 film
- Fatal attraction (sociology), a psychological theory about the failure of interpersonal relationships
- Edward Lasker vs. George Thomas (1912), a famous chess game that has been nicknamed "Fatal Attraction"

== See also ==
- Salt: A Fatal Attraction, a 2006 indie film by Bradford Tatum
- Fatal Distraction (disambiguation)
