= Live at the Apollo: The Proclamation =

Live At the Apollo: The Proclamation

Live album by Byron Cage
- Released: September 18, 2007
- Recorded: April 26, 2007
- Genre: Gospel, Worship & Praise
- Length: 61:03
- Label: GospoCentric Records/Zomba Gospel
- Producer: PAJAM

Byron Cage chronology
| An Invitation to Worship (2005) | Live At the Apollo: The Proclamation (2007) |

Byron Cage's album Live At the Apollo: The Proclamation was recorded live at the Apollo Theater on April 26, 2007, with production by PAJAM and featured guests J Moss, Kim Burrell, & Dave Hollister. The album was released in 2007. "I'm Going Back", was done by The Prince Of Praise in his notable style. This is also his third solo and fifth overall album.

Noted guests included Donald Lawrence, Dr. Bobby Jones, Rodney "Darkchild" Jerkins, and many others. DeWayne Woods, of "Let Go" fame, was director of a choir which included recording artists Crystal Rose and Earnest Pugh.

The album's first single, "With All of My Might" became available on iTunes for download in 2007.

== Track listing ==
| # | Title |
|---|---|
| 1 | The Proclamation |
| 2 | Worship The Lord |
| 3 | Royalty |
| 4 | I've Got A Reason |
| 5 | Anyhow (feat. [Dave Hollister]) |
| 6 | When He Comes Back |
| 7 | With All Of My Might |
| 8 | If You Never (feat. Kim Burrell & J Moss) |
| 9 | More Than You'll Ever Know |
| 10 | Your Spirit |
