= All in One (Karen Clark Sheard album) =

All In One

Studio album by Karen Clark Sheard
- Released: April 6, 2010
- Recorded: 2009–2010
- Genres: Gospel, urban contemporary gospel, R&B
- Length: 50:33
- Label: Karew Records
- Producers: J. Drew Sheard II, PAJAM

Karen Clark Sheard chronology
It's Not Over (2006)	All In One (2010)	Destined to Win (2015)

Professional ratings
Review scores
Source	Rating
Allmusic	3/5 stars

All In One is the fifth solo album by multiple Grammy and Stellar award-winning gospel singer Karen Clark Sheard, released on April 6, 2010. The album debuted at #3 on the U.S. Billboard Gospel Albums chart and #98 on the U.S. Billboard Top 200 albums chart and was the first album to be released on her own music label, Karew Records.

The album's lead single - "Prayed Up" - peaked at #9 on the U.S. Billboard Gospel Songs chart and spent over 32 weeks on the chart. The album's second single - "He Knows," featuring Dorinda Clark-Cole - peaked at #15 on the U.S. Billboard Gospel Songs chart. The album sold moderately well but still did not match Sheard's largest selling album to date, Finally Karen. However, All in One received positive reviews from critics and gathered Grammy, Stellar, Dove, and BET Award nominations and remained a top seller on Billboard's Gospel Charts.

== Track listing ==
1. Prayed Up (Karen Clark Sheard, J. Drew Sheard II) - 3:51
  *Produced by J. Drew Sheard II
  *Vocals arranged by Karen Clark Sheard & J. Drew Sheard II
  *Lead & Background Vocals performed by Karen Clark Sheard
  *Intro Voices & All Other Instruments performed by J Drew Sheard II
  *Bass Guitar: Thaddeus "Terry" Tribbett
  *Horns arranged & Saxophone played by DeShawn Jones
  *Trumpet: Kris Johnson
2. Hold On (J. Drew Sheard II, Karen Clark Sheard, Angel Chisholm) - 3:46
  *Produced by J. Drew Sheard II
  *Vocals arranged by Karen Clark Sheard & J. Drew Sheard II
  *Lead Vocals performed by Kierra Sheard & Karen Clark Sheard
  *Additional Background Vocals performed by J. Drew Sheard II & Karen Clark Sheard
  *Bass Guitar: Ronald "CJ" Alexander
  *Horns arranged & Saxophone played by DeShawn Jones
  *Trumpet: Kris Johnson
  *All Other Instruments played by J. Drew Sheard II
  *Contains a Vocal Sample from "Hip Hop Hooray" performed by Naughty by Nature
3. Blessings (Karen Clark Sheard, Charles Woolfork, J. Drew Sheard II) - 3:38
  *Produced by J. Drew Sheard II
  *Lead & Background Vocals: Karen Clark Sheard
  *Background Vocals: J. Drew Sheard II
  *Piano: Justin Brooks
  *Horns arranged & Saxophone played by DeShawn Jones
  *Trumpet: Kris Johnson
  *All Other Instruments played by Josh Davis & J. Drew Sheard II
4. I Made A Choice (J. Moss) - 4:08
  *Produced by PAJAM: Paul "PDA" Allen, J. Moss & Walter Kearney
  *Lead & Background Vocals: Karen Clark Sheard
  *Background Vocals: J. Moss
  *All Instruments (played by): PAJAM: Paul "PDA" Allen & J. Moss
5. Lord Take Me (featuring Kierra Sheard & Angel Chisholm) (J. Drew Sheard II, Angel Chisholm) - 4:41
  *Produced by J. Drew Sheard II
  *Vocals arranged & All Other Instruments played by J. Drew Sheard II
  *Lead Vocals performed by Angel Chisholm, Karen Clark Sheard & Kierra Sheard
  *Background Vocals performed by Angel Chisholm, Karen Clark Sheard & J. Drew Sheard II
  *Acoustic Guitar: Tom Stoepker
6. Good (J. Moss) - 4:34
  *Produced by PAJAM: Paul "PDA" Allen, J. Moss & Walter Kearney
  *Lead & Background Vocals: Karen Clark Sheard
  *Background Vocals: J. Moss
  *All Instruments: PAJAM: Paul "PDA" Allen & J. Moss
7. Because Of You (J. Moss) - 5:00
  *Produced by PAJAM: Paul "PDA" Allen, J. Moss & Walter Kearney
  *Lead & Background Vocals: Karen Clark Sheard
  *Background Vocals: J. Moss
  *All Instruments: PAJAM: Paul "PDA" Allen & J. Moss
8. Crazy Praise (Karen Clark Sheard, J. Drew Sheard II, Angel Chisholm) - 3:43
  *Produced by J. Drew Sheard II
  *Vocals arranged by Karen Clark Sheard
  *Lead & Background Vocals performed by Karen Clark Sheard
  *Background Vocals & All Other Instruments: J. Drew Sheard II
  *Bass Guitar: Ronald "CJ" Alexander
  *Horns arranged & Saxophone played by DeShawn Jones
  *Trumpet: Kris Johnson
9. What He Did (Karen Clark Sheard, J. Moss) - 4:30
  *Produced by PAJAM: Paul "PDA" Allen, J. Moss & Walter Kearney
  *Lead & Background Vocals: Karen Clark Sheard
  *Background Vocals: J. Moss
  *All Instruments: PAJAM: Paul "PDA" Allen & J. Moss
10. He Knows (featuring Dorinda Clark-Cole) (J. Moss, Paul D. Allen) - 4:12
  *Produced by PAJAM: Paul "PDA" Allen, J. Moss & Walter Kearney
  *Lead Vocals: Dorinda Clark-Cole & Karen Clark Sheard
  *Background Vocals: Karen Clark Sheard & J. Moss
  *Talking Voices (Intro): J. Moss
  *Instruments (played & sampled by): PAJAM: Paul "PDA" Allen & J. Moss
11. Have Your Way (Charles Woolfork, J. Drew Sheard II) - 4:35
  *Produced by J. Drew Sheard II
  *Talking Voices: Karen Clark Sheard
  *Background Vocals: Kierra Sheard & John Smith
  *Acoustic Guitar: Tom Stoepker
  *Piano: Anthony Taylor
  *Additional Keyboards: Josh Davis
  *Additional Instruments played by J. Drew Sheard II
12. All For One (Bonus Track) - 3:55
  *Produced by PAJAM: Paul "PDA" Allen, J. Moss & Walter Kearney
  *Background Vocals: J. Moss
  *Instruments: PAJAM: Paul "PDA" Allen & J. Moss

== Charts ==
Chart (2010)	Peak position
US Billboard 200	98
US Top Gospel Albums (Billboard)	3
