= 2nd Chance (Karen Clark Sheard album) =

Studio album by Karen Clark Sheard
- Released: July 30, 2002
- Genre: Urban contemporary gospel; contemporary R&B
- Length: 59:40
- Label: Elektra
- Producer: Tim & Bob; Karen Clark Sheard; Missy Elliott; Donald Lawrence; Walter Millsap III; PAJAM; Richard Smallwood; Mike City; Timbaland; Walter Millsap III

Karen Clark Sheard chronology
Finally Karen (1997)	2nd Chance (2002)	The Heavens Are Telling (2003)

Professional ratings
Review scores
Source	Rating
Allmusic	4/5 stars
Christianity Today	4.5/5 stars

2nd Chance is the second studio album by American gospel musician Karen Clark Sheard. It was released on July 30, 2002 on Elektra Records. The release was much anticipated for several reasons; Sheard was only the second gospel artist signed to Elektra Records, and this was her debut for the label. It was also her first release since the success of her Grammy-nominated debut Finally Karen, and a long bout with illness had delayed any releases from her since. The album peaked at #2 on the Billboard Gospel Charts, #3 on the Billboard Contemporary Christian Charts, #27 on the Billboard R&B/Hip-Hop Charts, and #82 on the Billboard 200.

In 2001, Clark-Sheard was faced with a life-threatening crisis when a blood vessel burst during a scheduled hernia surgery. Her doctors only gave her a 2% chance of survival due to her complications. After the blood clot was surgically removed, Clark-Sheard fell into a coma. The coma lasted three and a half weeks, but Clark-Sheard says she made a miraculous recovery. Despite citing hernia surgery, fans continue to speculate Clark-Sheard underwent a gastric bypass operation which led to complications of hernia and brain aneurysm since after the ordeal Sheard returned in 2001 having lost a significant amount of weight. This was later confirmed in the 2020 Clark Sisters biopic.

Though the release performed well on the charts and Clark-Sheard's vocals were in excellent form, the slick contemporary R&B production was not openly embraced by Sheard's core audience of traditional gospel music listeners. The 2003 follow-up release The Heavens Are Telling returned to the formula of her hugely successful, well-received, and Grammy-nominated debut Finally Karen by offering half of the album as a collection of live tracks, and half as a collection of upbeat studio productions.

== Track listing ==
No.	Title	Writer(s)	Producer(s)	Length
1.	"Be Sure"	James Moss	PAJAM	3:56
2.	"Only Call On Jesus"	Charlene Keys; Craig Brockman; Missy Elliott; Nisan Stewart	Elliott; Brockman^{[a]}; Stewart^{[a]}	4:09
3.	"I've Been Changed"	Walter "Lil Walt" Milsap III; Candice Nelson; Erick Walls; Harold Lilly; Karen Clark Sheard; Magdeline Millsap	Millsap	4:03
4.	"If I Can't Say a Word"	Donald Lawrence	Lawrence	5:30
5.	"I'll Be Right There"	Tim Kelley; Bob Robinson	Tim & Bob	4:40
6.	"Higher Ground" (featuring Missy Elliott, Yolanda Adams, Kim Burrell, Dorinda Clark Cole, Mary Mary, and Tweet)	Timothy Mosley; Kim Burrell; Brockmann; Elliott	Timbaland; Elliott^{[a]}; Brockmann^{[a]}	5:01
7.	"Brand New Day" (featuring Yolanda Adams)	Michael Flowers	Mike City	4:04
8.	"So Good"	Moss	PAJAM	4:05
9.	"2nd Chance"	Moss	PAJAM	4:15
10.	"A Secret Place"	Richard Smallwood	Smallwood	5:30
11.	"I Won't Let Go"	Daniel Weatherspoon; Lawrence	Lawrence	5:12
12.	"Sacrifice" (featuring Kierra "Kiki" Sheard)	Clark Sheard	Clark Sheard	4:31
13.	"It's Not Over"	Clark Sheard	Clark Sheard	4:39

Notes

- ^{^a} denotes co-producer

== Charts ==
Chart (2002)	Peak position
US Billboard 200	82
US Top R&B/Hip-Hop Albums (Billboard)	27
