= Live at the Apollo =

Live at the Apollo may refer to:

== Albums ==
=== James Brown ===
- Live at the Apollo (1963 album), by James Brown
- Live at the Apollo, Volume II, by James Brown, 1968
- Revolution of the Mind: Live at the Apollo, Volume III, by James Brown, 1971
- Live at the Apollo 1995, by James Brown, 1995

=== Other artists ===
- Live at the Apollo (B. B. King album), 1991
- Live at the Apollo (Ben Harper and The Blind Boys of Alabama album), 2005
- Live at the Apollo (Hall & Oates album), 1985
- Live at the Apollo (Robert Palmer album), 2001
- Live at the Apollo: The Proclamation, by Byron Cage, 2007
- Live at the Apollo 2010, a video by the Stranglers, 2010

== Television ==
- Live at the Apollo (TV series), a 2000s–2020s British stand-up comedy program

== See also ==
- Apollo Revisited, a 2003 album by the Stranglers
- At the Apollo, a 2008 album and video by Arctic Monkeys
- Jimmy McGriff at the Apollo, a 1963 album by Jimmy McGriff
- Live at Apollo, a 2009 video by Brother Firetribe
- Showtime at the Apollo, an American variety television show
