= Don't Give Up (Island Inspirational All-Stars song) =

Single by Kirk Franklin, Hezekiah Walker, Donald Lawrence and Karen Clark Sheard

from the album Don't Be a Menace to South Central While Drinking Your Juice in the Hood: The Soundtrack
- Released: October 28, 1995
- Genre: R&B, Gospel
- Length: 3:57
- Label: Island
- Producers: Stanley Brown; Donald Lawrence (co.)

"Don't Give Up" is a 1995 song by the Island Inspirational All-Stars (Kirk Franklin, Hezekiah Walker, Donald Lawrence and Karen Clark Sheard). The song appears on the soundtrack of the 1996 film Don't Be a Menace to South Central While Drinking Your Juice in the Hood. The project of these artists was a part of Island Records' exploration into the gospel music scene. The song peaked in the top 30 of the U.S. R&B chart. Proceeds from the sale of the single were donated to the rebuilding of black churches destroyed by arson. A total of $225,000 was raised from this song for this purpose.
