= Why Me? (Kierra Sheard song) =

Single by Kierra "Kiki" Sheard

from the album This Is Me
- Released: May 23, 2006
- Recorded: 2006
- Genre: Gospel
- Label: EMI Gospel
- Songwriter(s): Fred Jerkins III, Rodney Jerkins, Lashawn Daniels, Keyetta Jerkins
- Producer(s): Fred Jerkins III, Rodney Jerkins

Kierra "Kiki" Sheard singles chronology
"Let Go" (2005)	"Why Me?" (2006)	"Yes" (2006)

"Why Me" is the lead single off Kierra "Kiki" Sheard's This Is Me.

== Chart performance ==
Do to a success album, the single became successful as well. Why Me worked its way up the Top Gospel charts to number 6. The song has no official music video except her performance at 2007 Gospel Stellar Awards.

== Charts ==
Chart	Peak position
Hot Gospel	6

== Track listing ==
1. Why Me- 3:26
2. Yes-2:56
