= The Heavens Are Telling =

Live album by Karen Clark Sheard
- Released: November 4, 2003
- Genre: Gospel
- Length: 58:04
- Label: Elektra
- Producers: Donald Lawrence, J Moss, Paul "PDA" Allen

Karen Clark Sheard chronology
2nd Chance (2002)	The Heavens Are Telling (2003)	It's Not Over (2006)

Professional ratings
Review scores
Source	Rating
Allmusic	4/5 stars

The Heavens Are Telling is the third album by gospel singer Karen Clark Sheard, released on November 4, 2003. In the US, the album peaked at number three on the Billboard Top Gospel Charts, number 11 on Billboard Top Christian Albums, number 44 on the Billboard Top R&B/Hip-Hop Charts, and number 188 on the Billboard 200.

Though the previous album, 2nd Chance, performed well on the charts, the slick contemporary R&B production was not openly embraced by Sheard's core audience of traditional gospel music listeners. This release returns to the formula of her more well-received Grammy-nominated first album, Finally Karen, by offering half of the album as a collection of live tracks and half as a collection of upbeat studio productions. Radio edits of the live tracks "We Acknowledge You" and "We Are Not Ashamed (featuring Mary Mary)" were the album's singles.

Leaning more toward embracing a contemporary worship audience, Sheard covers two previously popularized songs written by Israel Houghton and Martha Munizzi. In a nod to the mainstream R&B audience that the previous album's style catered to, Sheard brings her daughter Kierra in on a gospelized live cover version of Jill Scott's signature song, "He Loves Me (Lyzel In E Flat)". It is also on this song that Sheard first commits to recording the self-echoing ad-libs that have become her signature.

This was Sheard's last album for the Elektra Records label, which was absorbed into Atlantic Records in February 2004.

== Track listing ==
1. We Acknowledge You - 5:03 (live) (Donald Lawrence)
2. We Are Not Ashamed (featuring Mary Mary) - 7:08 (live) (Andraé E. Crouch)
3. Glorious (Make The Praise) - 4:33 (live) (Israel Houghton, Martha Munizzi)
4. The Heavens Are Telling - 5:52 (live) (Lawrence)
5. God Is Here - 8:25 (live) (Houghton, Munizzi)
6. You Loved Me (featuring Kierra "Kiki" Sheard) - 6:43 (live) (Jill Scott, Keith Pelzer)
7. Go Ahead (featuring Missy Elliott) - 3:22 (studio) (James Moss, Paul Allen)
8. Praise Up - 4:45 (studio) (Moss, Allen)
9. I Owe - 4:09 (studio) (Moss)
10. Sometimes - 4:14 (studio) (Moss)
11. Don't Change (featuring "Kiki") - 3:45 (studio) (Moss)

== Charts ==
Chart (2003)	Peak position
US Billboard 200	188
US Top R&B/Hip-Hop Albums (Billboard)	44
