= Souled Out (Hezekiah Walker album) =

Live album by Hezekiah Walker & LFC
- Released: November 4, 2008
- Recorded: June 7, 2008; Love Fellowship Tabernacle
- Genre: CCM, Gospel
- Length: 55:59
- Label: Verity Records

Hezekiah Walker & LFC chronology
| The Essential Hezekiah Walker (2007) | Souled Out (2008) |

Professional ratings
Review scores
| Source | Rating |
|---|---|
| AllMusic | (?) |

Souled Out is a live album from contemporary gospel singer Hezekiah Walker and the Love Fellowship Choir. The album was recorded at the Love Fellowship Tabernacle on Saturday, June 7, 2008 and released on Tuesday, November 4, 2008 through Verity Records.

== Track listing ==
1. "Souled Out" - 3:54
2. "Keep On Moving On" - 4:59
3. "All Of My Help" - 4:54
4. "It Shall Come To Pass" - 6:00
5. "It Shall Come To Pass (Reprise)" (featuring Shawn McLemore) - 3:21
6. "O Give Thanks" - 3:58
7. "There's No Way" - 5:56
8. "Moving Forward" (featuring Ricardo Sanchez) - 5:38
9. "You're All I Need" - 5:13
10. "God Favored Me (Part I)" - 5:14
11. "God Favored Me (Part II)" (featuring Marvin Sapp and DJ Rogers) - 2:39
12. "Triumph (Already Done)" - 4:13

== Awards ==
At the 41st GMA Dove Awards, the album was nominated to a Dove Award for Contemporary Gospel Album of the Year. The title song was also nominated for Contemporary Gospel Recorded Song of the Year.

== Chart performance ==
The album peaked at #55 on the Billboard 200 and #2 on Billboard's Gospel Albums chart. It stayed 99 weeks on the Gospel charts.
