= The Best Is Yet to Come (Donald Lawrence song) =

Song by Donald Lawrence & The Tri-City Singers

from the album Go Get Your Life Back
- Released: 2002
- Genre: Gospel, Urban contemporary gospel
- Length: 8:52
- Label: EMI Gospel
- Songwriter(s): Brian Howes, Ross Hanson, Austin Winkler

"The Best Is Yet to Come" is the lead single of Donald Lawrence's 2002 album Go Get Your Life Back. It was reissued on their hits compilation Restoring the Years: The Best of Donald Lawrence & the Tri-City Singers in 2003.

The song musically is similar to his previous hit "Testify", and features guest appearances from Ann Nesby (formerly of Sounds of Blackness) and gospel pioneer Bishop Walter Hawkins.

Lawrence's lyrics "Hold on, my brother, don't give up Hold on, my sister, just look up" are frequently cited in Christian inspirational literature.
