= This Is Me (Kierra Sheard album) =

Studio album by Kierra "Kiki" Sheard
- Released: June 6, 2006
- Genre: Gospel; R&B
- Length: 44:17
- Label: EMI Gospel
- Producer: Warryn Campbell; Avriele Crandle; Lil Freddie; Uncle Freddie; PJ Morton; Antonio Neal; PAJAM; J. Drew Sheard; Kierra Sheard; Tommy Sims; Dwayne Wright

Kierra "Kiki" Sheard chronology
| Just Until... (2005) | This Is Me (2006) | Bold Right Life (2008) |

This Is Me is the second studio album by American singer Kierra "Kiki" Sheard. It was released by EMI Gospel on June 27, 2006 in the United States. Sheard reteamed with her brother J. Drew Sheard, Warryn Campbell and duo PAJAM to work on her sophomore album but also consulted new collaborators to write and produce on This Is Me, including PJ Morton, Antonio Neal, and Tommy Sims as well as Fred Jerkins III and his son Lil Freddie.

Upon release, the album earned generally mixed to positive reviews from music critics and became Sheard's second consecutive album to debut at number one on the US Billboard Top Gospel Albums, also reaching number 90 on the Billboard 200. Nominated for a Grammy Award for Best Contemporary R&B Gospel Album, This Is Me won a Dove Award for Urban Album of the Year at the 38th GMA Dove Awards in 2007.

== Background ==
Upon announcing the then future release, Sheard commented that she "called the album This Is Me because its more of the music me and my friends listen to, says Kiki. I grew up in the church, hearing and singing traditional Gospel, which I still love and will always be a big part of who I am. But when the Clark Sisters, then later, artists like Kirk Franklin, and Mary Mary stepped out and put the Gospel message to a contemporary sound, a lot of people, particularly the young, realized this was music they could relate to, and when they were then willing to give it a listen, the message started getting through as well."

== Critical reception ==
Professional ratings
Review scores
| Source | Rating |
|---|---|
| Allmusic | 4/5 stars |
| Cross Rhythms | 8/10 stars |

Allmusic editor Andree Farias found that This Is Me was less "calculated" than her debut album I Owe You (2004), writing: "It's more genuinely urban, befitting Sheard's age and sidestepping the ingratiatingly traditional side of I Owe You. As with most young performers, the disc is still handled by a bevy of producers and collaborators, but at least the songs never make Sheard sound out of character [...] Good for her: while This Is Me isn't always a smooth ride, it outdoes the debut in that it presents a more accurate picture of where she, not her family or her label, wants to head artistically."

This Is Me was met with mixed reaction from Sheard's core gospel fanbase. Where traditional gospel enthusiasts had a few tracks of that style to appease them on Kiki's debut project, her second album adopted an even more slick, contemporary sound. The only place the more trademark traditional "churchy" vocals appear are in the vamp of "No, Never". Nonetheless, scores of younger fans have been introduced to both traditional and contemporary gospel influences through Kiki Sheard's work. The artist herself stated that her goal with this album was to take the gospel message to a younger generation through songs that have a "beat they can associate with."

== Accolades ==
The album was nominated for a Grammy Award for Best Contemporary R&B Gospel Album in December 2006, and album won a Dove Award for Urban Album of the Year at the 38th GMA Dove Awards in 2007.

== Chart performance ==
Upon release, This Is Me became Sheard's second consecutive album to debut at number one on the US Billboard Top Gospel Albums chart, selling 11,000 copies in its first week — Sheard's best Nielsen Soundscan week at the time. In the US, it also reached number four on the Top Christian Albums, number 16 on the Top R&B/Hip-Hop Albums and number 90 on the Billboard 200.

== Track listing ==
| No. | Title | Writer(s) | Producer(s) | Length |
|---|---|---|---|---|
| 1. | "You're the Only One" | Fred Jerkins III; Fred Jerkins IV; LaShawn Daniels; Keyetta Jerkins | Uncle Freddie; Lil Freddie | 3:42 |
| 2. | "Yes" | Warryn "Baby Dubb" Campbell; Joi Campbell; Erica Campbell | W. Campbell | 2:56 |
| 3. | "It Is What It Is" | F. Jerkins III; Daniels; Jerkins | Uncle Freddie | 3:36 |
| 4. | "This Is Me" | F. Jerkins III; Delisha Thomas | Uncle Freddie | 4:23 |
| 5. | "Wrong Things" | James Moss | PAJAM | 3:58 |
| 6. | "Faith" | Kierra "Kiki" Sheard | J. Drew Sheard; K. Sheard | 2:47 |
| 7. | "Why Me?" | F. Jerkins III; Rodney Jerkins; Daniels; Jerkins | Uncle Freddie | 3:26 |
| 8. | "Have What You Want" | K. Sheard | J. Sheard; K. Sheard | 4:07 |
| 9. | "You" | W. Campbell; E. Campbell; Trecina Campbell | W. Campbell | 2:49 |
| 10. | "Change" | K. Sheard; PJ Morton; Tommy Sims | Morton; Sims | 3:28 |
| 11. | "No, Never" | K. Sheard | J. Sheard; K. Sheard | 3:44 |
| 12. | "Hear This" (Intro) | K. Sheard; Dwayne Wright; Avriele Crandle | Antonio Neal; Wright; Crandle | 0:28 |
| 13. | "Hear This" | K. Sheard; Wright; Crandle | Neal; Wright; Crandle | 4:49 |

Special edition bonus tracks
| No. | Title | Writer(s) | Producer(s) | Length |
|---|---|---|---|---|
| 14. | "Hands Up" | K. Sheard; F. Jerkins III | Uncle Freddie | 3:47 |
| 15. | "Always by My Side" | K. Sheard | J. Sheard; K. Sheard | 3:02 |
| 16. | "Scream" | Paul D. Allen; Wille Wood; Rodney Levens; Brian Bradley; Moss; Walter Kearney | PAJAM | 3:55 |
| 17. | "Here I Am" | Morton | Morton | 3:05 |
| 18. | "It's Not Over" | K. Sheard; Keyon Harrold | Neal; Harrold | 3:43 |
| 19. | "This Is Me" (Live) | F. Jerkins III; Thomas | Neal; K. Sheard | 4:32 |

Japan edition
| No. | Title | Writer(s) | Producer(s) | Length |
|---|---|---|---|---|
| 1. | "Yes" | W. Campbell; J. Campbell; E. Campbell | W. Campbell | 2:56 |
| 2. | "You" | W. Campbell; E. Campbell; T. Campbell | W. Campbell | 2:49 |
| 3. | "You're the Only One" | F. Jerkins III; F. Jerins IV; Daniels; Jerkins | Uncle Freddie; Lil Freddie | 3:42 |
| 4. | "Get Better – It's Not Over" | | | 3:43 |
| 5. | "This Is Me" | F. Jerkins III; Thomas | Uncle Freddie | 4:23 |
| 6. | "It Is What It Is" | F. Jerkins III; Daniels; Jerkins | Uncle Freddie | 3:36 |
| 7. | "Have What You Want" | K. Sheard | J. Sheard; K. Sheard | 4:07 |
| 8. | "Wrong Things" | J. Moss | PAJAM | 3:58 |
| 9. | "Why Me?" | F. Jerkins III; R. Jerkins; Daniels; Jerkins | Uncle Freddie | 3:26 |
| 10. | "Faith" | Kierra "Kiki" Sheard | J. Drew Sheard; K. Sheard | 2:47 |
| 11. | "Hands Up" | K. Sheard; F. Jerkins III | Uncle Freddie | 3:47 |
| 12. | "Get Yours" | | | 3:34 |
| 13. | "Scream" | Allen; Wood; Levens; Bradley; Moss; Kearney | PAJAM | 3:55 |
| 14. | "Hear This" | K. Sheard; Wright; Crandle | Neal; Wright; Crandle | 4:49 |
| 15. | "No, Never" | K. Sheard | J. Sheard; K. Sheard | 3:44 |
| 16. | "Rise" | | | 3:49 |

== Charts ==
| Chart (2006) | Peak position |
|---|---|
| US Billboard 200 | 90 |
| US Christian Albums (Billboard) | 3 |
| US Top Gospel Albums (Billboard) | 1 |
| US Top R&B/Hip-Hop Albums (Billboard) | 16 |
