= Who Me (disambiguation) =

Who, Me? was a chemical weapon developed by the American Office of Strategic Services.

Who Me may also refer to:

- "Who Me", a song by DJ Vadim from the album U.S.S.R. The Art of Listening, 2002
- "Who Me", a song by Megan Thee Stallion and Pooh Shiesty from the album Traumazine, 2022
- "Who Me?", a 1991 song by KMD

== See also ==
- Why Me (disambiguation)
