= Just Until... =

Remix album by Kierra "Kiki" Sheard
- Released: August 2, 2005 (worldwide); December 2005 (Japan)
- Genre: Christian R&B, gospel
- Length: 38:19
- Label: EMI Gospel
- Producer: Rodney Jerkins, Warryn Campbell, J Moss, Carlin "Godson" Muccular, Lee Jerkins, Doubledutch, Da Monsta, etc.

Kierra "Kiki" Sheard chronology
I Owe You (2004)	Just Until... (2005)	This Is Me (2006)

Just Until..., released August 2, 2005, is a collection of remixes of songs from the I Owe You album by American contemporary gospel singer Kierra "Kiki" Sheard. The title was abbreviated from its working title "Just Until The Next Record". Domestically, the album peaked at No. 10 on the US Billboard Gospel, and No. 82 on the Billboard R&B/Hip-Hop Charts.

The domestic album had an unexpected international hit in The Godson Concept remix of "Let Go". The upbeat gospel single, released only in Japan, raced to the No. 1 slot on both the Japanese overall/combined international and domestic radio charts. In the US, "That Thing" peaked at number 30 on the Gospel Airplay chart.

== Track listing ==
1. "You Don't Know (The Godson Rock Joint)"
2. "Sweetest Thing (Dutch Mix)"
3. "Let Go (Rock Soul Remix)"
4. "All I Am (Ol' Skool Quiet Storm Remix)"
5. "You Don't Know (Monsta's Mix)"
6. "Let Go (The Godson Concept)"
7. "Sweetest Thing (Soul House Mix)"
8. "War (Old & Ugly Mix)"
9. "That Thing" (bonus track)

== Japanese Import ==
Let Go (Japanese Edition) (Toshiba-EMI, released December 2005)
For the Japanese Edition of Just Until..., the collection was retitled Let Go and given an alternative cover. This change was, no doubt, to capitalize on the multimedia success of the song of the same name. The cover of the Japanese version contains the same tracks as Just Until..., but in a different order, and also including 6 songs from I Owe You. The track listing is as follows:

1. "Let Go (Rock Soul Remix)"
2. "You Don't Know (Monsta's Mix)"
3. "War (Old & Ugly Mix)"
4. "Sweetest Thing (Dutch Mix)"
5. "All I Am (Ol' Skool Quiet Storm Remix)"
6. "So Long"
7. "Praise Offering"
8. "Church Nite"
9. "Closer"
10. "Let Go"
11. "You Don't Know"
12. "You Don't Know (The Godson Rock Joint)"
13. "Let Go (The Godson Concept)"
14. "Sweetest Thing (Soul House Mix)"
15. "That Thing"

== Chart history ==
Chart (2005)	Peak position
U.S. Billboard Top R&B/Hip-Hop Albums	82
U.S. Billboard Gospel Albums	10

== Awards ==
The album was nominated for a Dove Award for Urban Album of the Year at the 37th GMA Dove Awards.
