= It's Not Over (Karen Clark Sheard album) =

Studio album by Karen Clark Sheard
- Released: January 24, 2006
- Genre: Gospel; Urban contemporary gospel CCM; R&B
- Length: 62:01
- Label: Word/Warner Bros./Curb
- Producer: Israel Houghton, J Moss, Paul "PDA" Allen, J Drew Sheard

Karen Clark Sheard chronology
The Heavens Are Telling (2003)	It's Not Over (2006)	All in One (2010)

Professional ratings
Review scores
Source	Rating
Allmusic	3.5/5 stars
Christianity Today	4.5/5 stars
Cross Rhythms	9/10 stars

It's Not Over is the fourth album by gospel singer Karen Clark Sheard, released on January 24, 2006. The album peaked at number four on the Billboard Top Gospel Charts and number 124 on the Billboard 200. This is Karen Clark Sheard's debut as a solo artist for Word Records, but not her first foray with the label, as she was signed to Word as a member of the Clark Sisters two decades prior to the album's release. Former gospel artist Desmond Pringle was instrumental in signing Sheard to the label. This is the first Sheard album that does not include any guest appearances at all, not even from daughter Kierra "Kiki" Sheard who had appeared on all of Clark-Sheard's previous solo albums to date. However her son, J. Drew Sheard, played drums for all of the live recorded tracks (1–9), as well as producing the closing track.

== Track listing ==
No.	Title	Writer(s)	Length
1.	"Rejoice and Be Glad"	Houghton, Lindsey	4:11
2.	"I Never Will/You Brought the Sunshine"	Clark-Terrell, Houghton, Lindsey	7:22
3.	"Authority"	Clark-Sheard, Houghton, Lindsey	5:14
4.	"Favor"	Houghton, Lindsey	10:14
5.	"Show Me Your Glory"	Cruse-Ratcliff, Houghton	4:40
6.	"Medley: Oh the Glory of His Presence"	Fry	4:43
7.	"The Medley: The Lord's Prayer/Worship Forever"	Houghton, Lindsey, Malotte	2:20
8.	"Medley: Hallelujah"	Clark-Terrell	3:17
9.	"It's Not Over"	Clark-Sheard	6:06
10.	"Be Blessed"	Allen, Moss	3:43
11.	"You Showed Me"	Moss	4:28
12.	"A Living Testimony"	Clark-Sheard	5:43

== Charts ==
Chart (2006)	Peak position
US Billboard 200	124
US Top Gospel Albums (Billboard)	4

== Awards ==
In 2007, the album was nominated for a Dove Award for Contemporary Gospel Album of the Year at the 38th GMA Dove Awards.
