= Destined to Win =

Live album by Karen Clark Sheard
- Released: July 21, 2015
- Recorded: House of Hope; Chicago, Illinois
- Genre: Gospel, Christian R&B, contemporary R&B, urban contemporary gospel
- Length: 56:23
- Label: Karew, Entertainment One
- Producer: Donald Lawrence

Karen Clark Sheard chronology
All in One (2010)	Destined to Win (2015)	Still Karen (2024)

Destined to Win is a live album from Karen Clark Sheard. Entertainment One Music alongside Karew Music released the album on July 21, 2015. This album became her highest-charting album in her solo career, debuting with 15,000 copies sold in its first week. She worked with Donald Lawrence, in the production of this album.

== Critical reception ==
Professional ratings
Review scores
Source	Rating
AllMusic	4/5 stars
Gospel Pundit	5/5 stars
Journal of Gospel Music	4/5 stars
New Release Today	3.5/5 stars

Reviewing the album for The New York Times, Ben Ratliff states, "There are three or four places on the record — and they are extended sequences, not just moments — when a listener can start to worry: Do I deserve these riches?" Andy Kellman, awarding the album four stars at AllMusic, writes, "this is another worthy addition to the Clark Sheard catalog." Rating the album three and a half stars from New Release Today, Dwayne Lacy says, "the 'less is more' approach shows that 10 total songs are enough for a complete album." Bob Marovich, indicating in a four star review by the Journal of Gospel Music, responds, "Destined to Win reminds listeners of the church's—and gospel music’s—mandate to encourage the discouraged and give heart to the disheartened." Assigning the album a five stars rating for Gospel Pundit, Erik Justin "E.J." Gaines replies, "Destined To Win is a powerful declaration of faith and victory, marked by the impeccable and unparalleled vocals of one of gospel music’s greatest treasures."

== Track listing ==
No.	Title	Writer(s)	Length
1.	"The Who Doesn't Matter"	Donald Lawrence, Loren McGee	5:33
2.	"Destined to Win"	Myron Butler, Darrell Freeman	5:04
3.	"The Resurrection"	Richard Smallwood	5:10
4.	"Sunday A.M."	Rudy Currence, Lawrence	6:12
5.	"Only Call on Jesus"	Craig Brockman, Melissa Elliott, Charlene Keys, Nisan Stewart	6:09
6.	"My Words Have Power" (featuring Donald Lawrence & Co.)	Minister Gerald Robinson	8:14
7.	"Already Looking Better"	Donishisa Ballard	5:30
8.	"The Worst Is Over"	Oscar Williams	6:39
9.	"My God Is Big"	Karen Clark Sheard, Mike Guglielmucci, J. Drew Sheard II	3:54
10.	"We Acknowledge You"	Lawrence	3:58
Total length:			56:23

== Chart performance ==
Chart (2015)	Peak position
US Billboard 200	20
US Top Gospel Albums (Billboard)	2
US Independent Albums (Billboard)	4
