= You Don't Know (Kierra Sheard song) =

Single by Kierra Sheard-Kelly

from the album I Owe You
- B-side: "Praise Offering"
- Released: August 17, 2004
- Recorded: 2004
- Studio: Atlanta, Georgia
- Venue: Studio
- Genre: Urban Gospel / R&B
- Length: 4:11
- Label: EMI Gospel
- Songwriter(s): Rodney Jerkins, Danny Nixon, LaShawn Daniels, Fred Jerkins III, Delisha Thomas
- Producer(s): Rodney Jerkins, Jazz Nixon

Kierra Sheard-Kelly singles chronology
| "You Don't Know" (2004) | "Let Go" (2004) |

"You Don't Know" is the debut single by gospel artist Kierra "Kiki" Sheard, released August 17, 2004. The song was chosen as the lead single for Sheard's debut album, I Owe You. The song was specifically written and produced for Sheard by Rodney Jerkins for Darkchild Productions.

== Song information ==
In 2001 Kierra's mother, Karen Clark-Sheard, was faced with a life-threatening crisis when a blood vessel burst during a scheduled hernia surgery. Her doctors only gave her a 2% chance of survival due to her complications. After the blood clot was surgically removed, Clark-Sheard fell into a coma. The coma lasted for weeks, but she made a miraculous recovery. Clark-Sheard's near-death experience is said to have inspired "You Don't Know".

== Chart performance ==
"You Don't Know" cracked the Billboard Hot R&B/Hip Hop singles list at number 84. It is one of the few singles by the artist to chart while her full-length albums generally have charted well.

| Chart (2004) | Peak position |
|---|---|
| U.S. Billboard Hot R&B/Hip-Hop Songs | 84 |

== Awards ==
In 2005, the song won a Dove Award for Urban Recorded Song of the Year at the 36th GMA Dove Awards.

== Track listing ==
1. You Don't Know (album version) -4:20
2. You Don't Know (extended mix) -4:57
3. You Don't Know (instrumental) -4:19
4. Praise Offering -7:34
