= Free (Kierra Sheard album) =

Live album by Kierra Sheard ft. BRL
- Released: 18 October 2011
- Recorded: 28 February 2011
- Venue: Harold Washington Cultural Center (Chicago, IL)
- Genre: Urban contemporary gospel
- Length: 1:09:10
- Label: Karew Entertainment, EMI Gospel
- Producer: J. Drew Sheard

Kierra Sheard ft. BRL chronology
Bold Right Life (2008)	Free (2011)	Graceland (2014)

Singles from Free
- 1. "Mighty" Released: June 2011; 2. "You Are" Released: September 2011; 3. "Indescribable" Released: September 2012

Free is the fourth album and first live recording from American contemporary gospel singer Kierra Sheard. It was released 18 October 2011 by Karew Records, under exclusive license to EMI Gospel. Originally scheduled for a 12 July 2011 release, the album was leaked and subsequently pushed back and reformatted with a different track listing. The album features Sheard's BRL Choir (Bold Right Life) Choir.

== Reviews ==
"Kierra Sheard's Free features a mix of studio and live-in-Chicago material with a full band and her BRL Choir, all produced by her brother, J. Drew Sheard II. It’s Sheard’s boldest and most diverse album yet. There are the expected modern contemporary gospel sounds, while a few songs incorporate other styles, including pop-R&B (à la Bold Right Life's "Wave Your Banner"), dance-pop, and even hard rock, with remarkable ease and power. This would not be so effective if Sheard wasn't in top, hefty-yet-flexible form." – Andy Kellman, AllMusic

== Track listing ==
1. "Intro (I Am Free)"
2. "WAR"
3. "Mighty"
4. "You Are"
5. "Interlude"
6. "Desire"
7. "Free"
8. "Indescribable"
9. "People (featuring S.O.M.)"
10. "Victory (featuring James Fortune)"
11. "Believers Evolved"
12. "Back 2 Earth"
13. "Lane (featuring JDS)"
14. "Since I Found Christ (featuring Mali Music & JDS)"
15. "Ready To Go (iTunes Exclusive)”

== Charts ==
=== Weekly charts ===
Chart (2011)	Peak position
US Billboard 200	40
US Top Christian Albums (Billboard)	1

=== Year-end charts ===
Chart (2011)	Position
US Top Gospel Albums (Billboard)	44
