= 21:03 =

American hip hop group

21:03 is an American contemporary gospel, Christian R&B and Christian hip hop group from Detroit, Michigan. Its members include Evin Martin and Torrence Greene. Former members were Jo'rel Quinn and Sean Grant. The group is signed to PAJAM and some of their albums include PAJAM Presents Twenty One O’ Three (2006) and Total Attention (2008). The group has also experienced Billboard success with their hit singles, "Still Here", "Incredible" and "Cover Me".

== History ==
The members of 21:03 were hand picked from hundreds of other singers in the Detroit area to be a part of the PAJAM record label. Critical acclaim for 21:03 includes a Stellar Award win and Grammy Award nomination.

== Discography ==
=== Studio albums ===
List of studio albums, with selected chart positions
Album title	Album details	Peak chart positions
Album title	Album details	US Gospel
Twenty One O’ Three	Released: 2006; Label: Verity Records; CD, digital download	11
Total Attention	Released: 2008; Label: Verity Records; CD, digital download	4
Evolved...from Boys to Men	Released: 2011; Label: Verity Records; CD, digital download	12

=== Singles ===
List of singles, with selected chart positions
Song title	Album details	Peak chart positions
Song title	Album details	US Gospel
"You"	Album Total Attention; Released: 2008; Label: Verity Records; CD, digital download	—
"Incredible"	Album: Evolved... From Boys to Men (2011); Single Released: 2010; Label: Verity Records; CD, digital download	17
"Still Here"	Album: Evolved... From Boys to Men; Released: 2011; Single Re-released: 2012; Label: Verity Records; CD, digital download	18 (in 2011) 16 (in 2012)
