= Graceland (Kierra Sheard album) =

Studio album by Kierra Sheard
- Released: July 22, 2014
- Recorded: 2013–2014
- Genre: Gospel
- Length: 39:45
- Label: Karew; Motown Gospel
- Producer: Vincent Berry II; Justin Brooks; Steven Collins; J. Drew Sheard; Harmony Samuels

Kierra Sheard chronology
Free (2011)	Graceland (2014)	Kierra (2020)

Singles from Graceland
- 1. "2nd Win" Released: 28 August 2014; 2. "Flaws" Released: 28 April 2015; 3. "Repin My God" Released: 9 Feb 2016

Graceland is the fifth studio album by American singer Kierra Sheard. It was released by Karew Records and Motown Gospel on July 22, 2014. Her debut with her brother's J. Drew Sheard music label, the album debuted at number one on US Top Gospel Albums and reached number 33 on the US Billboard 200, becoming Sheard's highest-charting album yet. Graceland was nominated for a Stellar Award and a GMA Dove Award for Contemporary Gospel/Urban Album of the Year.

== Critical reception ==
Professional ratings
Review scores
Source	Rating
AllMusic	4/5 stars

AllMusic wrote that "with the album being skillfully laid out and paced, Sheard remains at the forefront of progressive gospel with Graceland."

== Track listing ==
No.	Title	Length
1.	"Intro: Spoken Word"	3:42
2.	"2nd Win"	2:55
3.	"Balm (Interlude)"	1:10
4.	"Moving Forward"	4:11
5.	"Save Me"	3:51
6.	"Flaws"	3:04
7.	"Kill the Dragon"	5:03
8.	"Repin My God" (featuring Canton Jones)	4:24
9.	"You Don't Like What You See" (Interlude)	1:15
10.	"In You"	3:31
11.	"No Graceland"	3:44
12.	"Go"	2:55

== Charts ==
=== Weekly charts ===
Chart (2014)	Peak position
UK Christian & Gospel Albums (OCC)	9
US Billboard 200	33
US Top Gospel Albums (Billboard)	1

=== Year-end charts ===
Chart (2014)	Position
US Top Gospel Albums (Billboard)	26
