= Ramiyah =

- Origin: Detroit, Michigan
- Genres: Gospel
- Years active: 2003-2005
- Labels: Columbia

The four members of gospel group Ramiyah consisted of Stephanie Bonner, Tracy Bryant, DeLaurian Burton, and Sherise Staten. The girls were raised in Detroit, MI, and were brought together by the PAJAM production team. They have appeared on: The Stellar Awards, Showtime at the Apollo, and the Trumpet Awards.

== Music career ==
In 2003, Ramiyah released their self-titled album Ramiyah, which was released through Columbia. Ramiyah released their singles "Waiting" and "Turn It Out". Waiting did well on the gospel charts, but their previous single "Turn It Out" failed to reach gospel charts and to do well as the first single "Waiting". The album hit #8 on the Billboard Gospel charts in 2004. In 2005, the group disbanded and journeyed into solo endeavors.

In 2007, Music World Entertainment re-released their debut album under the name "Hits Revealed: Ramiyah".

== Filmography ==
2003: The Fighting Temptations

== Discography ==
=== Albums ===
- 2003: Ramiyah

=== Singles ===
- 2003: "Waiting"
- 2003: "Turn It Out"
- 2011: "He Is The One"
