= Karen Clark Sheard =

American gospel singer (born 1960)

- Also known as: Karen Clark-Sheard, First Lady Karen Clark-Sheard
- Born: Karen Valencia Clark; November 15, 1960 (age 65); Detroit, Michigan, U.S.
- Genres: Gospel; Urban gospel; CCM
- Occupations: Singer; songwriter; actress
- Instruments: Vocals; keyboards; organ; drums
- Years active: 1973–present
- Labels: Island Black Music; Elektra; Karew; Motown Gospel; Word
- Member of: The Clark Sisters
- Spouse: John Drew Sheard Sr. (m. 1984)

Karen Valencia Clark Sheard (née Clark; born November 15, 1960) is an American gospel singer and songwriter. Clark-Sheard is the youngest member of gospel group the Clark Sisters, which was formed in 1973. She is also the mother of contemporary gospel singer and actress Kierra "Kiki" Sheard, with whom she frequently collaborates. She has released seven solo albums and 17 with the Clark Sisters.

During the hiatus of the Clark Sisters, Clark-Sheard recorded her debut studio album Finally Karen (1997), which spawned the single, "Balm in Gilead" (a re-recording of a song she originally recorded as part of the Clark Sisters in the 1980s for their Heart & Soul album) the R&B-tinged singles "Just for Me" and "Nothing Without You" (with Faith Evans). Finally Karen was among the highest-selling gospel albums of that year, and earned Clark-Sheard a Grammy Award nomination and a Soul Train Lady of Soul Award for "Best Female Vocalist".

Clark-Sheard then was hospitalized in 2001 after a blood vessel burst during a bariatric surgery, resulting in doctors giving her a 2% chance of survival. The experience inspired the title for her second album, 2nd Chance (2002). Clark-Sheard recorded two more live albums—The Heavens Are Telling (2003) and It's Not Over (2006)—before releasing All in One (2010), her second studio album. It debuted at number two on the Billboard Gospel Chart and entered the Billboard 200, while its single "Prayed Up" peaked at number nine on the Gospel Songs chart.

Singers Beyoncé, Mariah Carey, and Faith Evans have named Clark Sheard and her sister Twinkie Clark as musical influences.

== Biography ==
=== Early life and education ===
Clark-Sheard was born Karen Valencia Clark on November 15, 1960, in Detroit, Michigan, the youngest child of Reverend Elbert Clark and Dr. Mattie Moss Clark, a gospel choral director. The youngest of six children, Clark-Sheard's siblings are Leo, Jacky, Denise, Elbernita "Twinkie" and Dorinda. Clark-Sheard began singing gospel with her sisters at age 5 in what became known as the Clark Sisters. For high school, Clark-Sheard attended Mumford High School in Detroit, Michigan, graduating in 1978.

=== Career ===
==== Debut album ====
Clark-Sheard's involvement in the Island Inspirational All Stars' "Don't Give Up" in 1996 (along with Donald Lawrence, Hezekiah Walker, and Kirk Franklin) led to her signing with Island Records. Clark-Sheard's solo career began with the release of her debut album Finally Karen in 1997. The album, consisting of half studio recordings and half live recordings, was nominated for a Grammy Award for Best Contemporary Soul Gospel Album in 1998, won Clark-Sheard the Lady of Soul award for Best Gospel Album that same year and peaked at No. 28 and No. 2 on the U.S. Billboard Top R&B/Hip-Hop Albums and U.S. Billboard Gospel Albums charts respectively.

==== 2nd Chance ====
After Yolanda Adams, Clark-Sheard became the 2nd gospel artist to sign to Elektra Records. She released her Elektra debut album 2nd Chance in 2002 (so named because of the "second chance" she was given by God after her near-death experience – which is referenced in her daughter Kierra's song "You Don't Know"). The album was led off by the single "Be Sure". The album reached No. 82 on the U.S. Billboard 200, No. 27 on the U.S. Billboard Top R&B/Hip-Hop Albums chart (her highest placements on those charts to date) and No. 2 on the U.S. Billboard Gospel Albums.

==== The Heavens Are Telling ====
The 2003 follow-up The Heavens Are Telling (exactly six years after her heralded debut album Finally Karen) came when Elektra Records was being dissolved into Atlantic Records, and failed to match the commercial success of Clark-Sheard's previous albums, peaking 106 places below 2nd Chance at No. 188 on the U.S. Billboard 200 – though it managed to reach No. 44 on the U.S. Billboard Top R&B/Hip-Hop Albums, a high No. 3 on the U.S. Billboard Gospel Albums chart and was her first album to chart on the U.S. Billboard Christian Albums chart, where it peaked at No. 11.

==== It's Not Over ====
In 2005, after a bidding war with several labels, Clark-Sheard signed with Word Records and issued It's Not Over (originally titled Finally Karen Returns), the sequel to her 1997 debut album Finally Karen was set to be released November 15, 2005, Clark-Sheard's 45th birthday, but was delayed and released the following year. Most of It's Not Over was recorded in 2005 at Karen's home church in Detroit, Michigan, while the last three tracks were studio-recorded.

It was Clark-Sheard's first solo album not to feature guest vocals from her daughter (Kierra Sheard) and was the first to include production from Israel Houghton – who handled the majority of the project. It charted at No. 124 on the U.S. Billboard 200 and No. 4 on the U.S. Billboard Top R&B/Hip-Hop Albums. As the songwriter, on February 10, 2008, Clark-Sheard won the Grammy Award for Best Gospel Song for "Blessed & Highly Favored" sung by the Clark Sisters.

==== Karew Records, fifth album and present ====
In early 2009, Clark-Sheard and her husband, J.Drew Sheard, partnered together and launched a new record label entitled Karew Records (Karew being a combination of both their forenames: Karen and Drew, pronounced: Kuh-rue); Distribution is via EMI Gospel. The Clark Sisters' Christmas album – which was released in October 2009 – was the first project to be released from Karew Records.

On January 31, 2010, Clark-Sheard won the Grammy Award for Best Gospel Performance for Wait on the Lord which she was featured with Donnie McClurkin. On April 6, 2010, Clark-Sheard released her fifth album (and first on her newly founded own record label – Karew Records) titled All in One, which features additional vocals from her daughter Kierra Sheard, son J. Drew Sheard II, sister Dorinda Clark Cole, niece Angel Chisholm and cousin J. Moss. Her first all-studio-recorded album since her 2002 release 2nd Chance, All in One debuted and peaked at No. 98 on the U.S. Billboard 200 (her second highest charting on that chart to date) and No. 3 on the U.S. Billboard Gospel Albums chart, while the album's lead single – "Prayed Up" – peaked at No. 9 and stayed over 22 weeks on the U.S. Billboard Hot Gospel Songs chart. Clark-Sheard released her latest single "Sunday A.M" in 2014, which was nominated for the Best Gospel Song in the 57th Annual Grammy Awards.

In 2015, Clark-Sheard released her sixth album, Destined to Win. The album would become Clark-Sheard's highest charting and fastest selling album in her solo career, as well as her first live album since It's Not Over in 2006.

In 2019, Clark-Sheard was in talks to play Kitty Parham, a member of the Famous Ward Singers in Aretha Franklin's biopic Respect.

Karen was portrayed by her daughter, Kierra Sheard in the Lifetime TV biopic The Clark Sisters: First Ladies of Gospel, released April 11, 2020.

== Personal life ==
=== Marriage and family ===
Clark-Sheard married Bishop J. Drew Sheard, a Detroit-based minister, on June 16, 1984. Clark-Sheard serves as the First Lady of Greater Emmanuel Institutional Church of God in Christ in Detroit, where her husband is senior pastor. In March 2021, Bishop Sheard was elected to serve as the Presiding Bishop of the COGIC denomination, thus making her the First Lady of the COGIC denomination at-large as well. Together they have two children: Kierra "Kiki" Sheard-Kelly (1987) and John Drew "J. Drew" Sheard II (1989). Another pregnancy ended in a stillbirth.

=== Health ===
In 2001, Clark-Sheard was faced with a life-threatening crisis when a blood vessel burst during a scheduled bariatric surgery. Her doctors gave her only a 2% chance of survival. After the blood clot was surgically removed, Clark-Sheard fell into a coma. The coma lasted around 3 1/2 weeks but Clark-Sheard says she made a miraculous recovery. Kierra Sheard explains this situation in her song "You Don't Know" from her debut album I Owe You.

== Tours and concerts ==
- The Clark Sisters: Bringing It Back Home (1989)
- Finally Karen (1997)
- The Clark Sisters: Live One Last Time Tour (2007–2008)
- Festival of Praise (2016–2017)
- McDonald's Celebration of Gospel (2016–2017)
- The Clark Sisters Virtual Experience (2020)
- The Reunion Tour (2023)
- The Reunion Tour 2024 (2024)

== Filmography ==
- 1983 Gospel (documentary)
- 2010 Blessed & Cursed (movie)
- 2011–2012 Church Girl (stage play)
- 2012 For Richer or Poorer (stage play)
- 2013 "The Sheards"
- 2013 "BET Celebration of Gospel"
- 2014 "The BET Honors"
- 2017 "Xscape: Still Kickin It" (Xscape Rocks the Stage, Episode 4)
- 2020 The Clark Sisters: First Ladies of Gospel (movie)
- 2021 Miracles Across 125th Street
- 2021 Song and Story: Amazing Grace

== Discography ==
=== Studio albums ===
- Finally Karen (1997)
- 2nd Chance (2002)
- The Heavens Are Telling (2003)
- It's Not Over (2006)
- All in One (2010)
- Destined to Win (2015)
- Still Karen (2024)

== Awards ==
=== BET Awards ===
The BET Awards are awarded annually by the Black Entertainment Television network. Karen Clark Sheard has received 3 nominations.

Year	Award	Nominated work	Result
2008	Best Gospel Artist	The Clark Sisters	Nominated
2011	Best Gospel Artist	Herself	Nominated
2020	Dr. Bobby Jones Best Gospel/Inspirational Award	"Victory"	Nominated

=== Dove Awards ===
The Dove Awards are awarded annually by the Gospel Music Association. Clark Sheard has won 4 awards from 14 nominations.

Year	Award	Nominated work	Result
1983	Inspirational Black Gospel Album of the Year	Sincerely	Nominated
1987	Contemporary Gospel Album of the Year	Heart & Soul	Won
1995	Traditional Black Gospel Recorded Song of the Year	"Amazing Grace"	Nominated
2007	Contemporary Gospel Album of the Year	It's Not Over	Won
2007	Contemporary Gospel Recorded Song of the Year	"Favor"	Nominated
2008	Artist of the Year	The Clark Sisters	Nominated
2008	Group of the Year	The Clark Sisters	Nominated
2008	Contemporary Gospel Recorded Song of the Year	"Blessed and Highly Favored"	Nominated
2008	Contemporary Gospel Album of the Year	Live – One Last Time	Nominated
2011	Urban Recorded Song of the Year	"He Knows"	Nominated
2020	Traditional Gospel Recorded Song of the Year	"Victory"	Nominated
2020	Inspirational Film of the Year	The Clark Sisters: First Ladies of Gospel	Nominated
2020	Traditional Gospel Album of the Year	The Return	Won
2025	Contemporary Gospel Album of the Year	Still Karen	Nominated
2025	Traditional Gospel Recorded Song of the Year	"Yes"	Won
2026	Contemporary Gospel Recorded Song of the Year	"Jesus I Do" (with Mariah Carey)	Pending

=== Grammy Awards ===
The Grammy Awards are awarded annually by the National Academy of Recording Arts and Sciences. Karen Clark Sheard has won 5 awards from 13 nominations, including a Lifetime Achievement award.

Year	Award	Nominated work	Result
1983	Best Soul Gospel Performance by a Duo or Group	Sincerely	Nominated
1987	Best Soul Gospel Performance by a Duo or Group, Choir or Chorus	Heart & Soul	Nominated
1988	Best Soul Gospel Performance by a Duo or Group, Choir or Chorus	Conqueror	Nominated
1990	Best Traditional Soul Gospel Album	Bringing it Back Home	Nominated
1999	Best Contemporary Gospel Soul Album	Finally Karen	Nominated
2007	Best Gospel Performance	"Blessed & Highly Favored"	Won
2007	Best Gospel Song	"Blessed & Highly Favored"	Won
2007	Best Traditional Gospel Album	Live: One Last Time	Won
2009	Best R&B Performance by a Duo or Group with Vocals	"Higher Ground"	Nominated
2009	Best Gospel Performance	"Wait on the Lord" (with Donnie McClurkin)	Won
2010	Best Traditional Gospel Album	All In One	Nominated
2015	Best Gospel Performance/Song	"Sunday A.M. (Live)"	Nominated
2016	Best Gospel Album	Destined To Win (Live)	Nominated
2024	Best Gospel Performance/Song	"God is Good"	Nominated
2024	Grammy Lifetime Achievement Award	The Clark Sisters	Honored
2025	Best Gospel Album	Still Karen	Nominated

=== NAACP Image Awards ===
The NAACP Image Awards are awarded annually by the National Association for the Advancement of Colored People (NAACP). Clark Sheard has won 2 awards from 8 nominations.

Year	Award	Nominated work	Result
1983	Outstanding Gospel Artist	The Clark Sisters	Won
1989	Outstanding Gospel Artist	The Clark Sisters	Nominated
2020	Outstanding Gospel/Christian Song – Traditional or Contemporary	"Victory"	Nominated
2021	Outstanding Gospel/Christian Album	The Return	Won
2024	Outstanding Duo, Group or Collaboration (Traditional)	"God Is Good" (with Kierra Sheard and Hezekiah Walker)	Nominated
2025	Outstanding Gospel/Christian Album	Still Karen	Nominated
2026	Outstanding Duo, Group or Collaboration (Traditional)	"Jesus I Do" (with Mariah Carey)	Nominated
2026	Outstanding Gospel/Christian Song	"Jesus I Do" (with Mariah Carey)	Nominated

=== Soul Train Awards ===
The Soul Train Music Awards are awarded annually. Karen Clark Sheard has won 1 award from 5 nominations.

Year	Award	Nominated work	Result
Soul Train Music Awards
1988	Best Gospel Album – Group or Choir	Heart & Soul	Nominated
1989	Best Gospel Album	Conqueror	Nominated
2005	Best Gospel Album	The Heavens Are Telling	Nominated
2020	Best Gospel/Inspirational Award	The Clark Sisters	Nominated
Soul Train Lady of Soul Awards
1998	Best Gospel Album	Finally Karen	Won

=== Stellar Awards ===
The Stellar Awards are awarded annually by SAGMA. Karen Clark Sheard has received 12 awards and 2 honorary awards.

Year	Award	Nominated work	Result
1999	Female Vocalist of the Year	Finally Karen	Won
1999	Contemporary Female Vocalist of the Year	Finally Karen	Won
1999	Album of the Year	Finally Karen	Nominated
1999	Contemporary Album of the Year	Finally Karen	Nominated
1999	Music Video of the Year	Finally Karen	Won
2004	Female Vocalist of the Year	2nd Chance	Nominated
2004	Contemporary Female Vocalist of the Year	2nd Chance	Nominated
2004	Contemporary CD of the Year	2nd Chance	Nominated
2005	Song of the Year	"We Acknowledge You"	Nominated
2005	CD of the Year	The Heavens Are Telling	Nominated
2005	Contemporary Female Vocalist of the Year	The Heavens Are Telling	Nominated
2007	Contemporary Female Vocalist of the Year	It's Not Over	Nominated
2007	The Chevrolet Most Notable Achievement Award	The Clark Sisters	Honored
2008	CD of the Year	Live... One Last Time	Won
2008	Artist of the Year	Live... One Last Time	Won
2008	Group or Duo of the Year	Live... One Last Time	Won
2008	Traditional Group/Duo of the Year	Live... One Last Time	Won
2008	Song of the Year	"Blessed and Highly Favored"	Nominated
2009	Special Event CD of the Year	Encore: The Best of the Clark Sisters	Won
2010	Special Event CD of the Year	Silky Soul Music... An All-Star Tribute to Maze (with Kierra Sheard and J. Moss)	Won
2011	Female Vocalist of the Year	All In One	Won
2011	Contemporary Female Vocalist of the Year	All In One	Nominated
2016	Contemporary Female Vocalist of the Year	Destined To Win	Nominated
2020	James Cleveland Lifetime Achievement Award	The Clark Sisters	Honored
2021	Contemporary Duo/Group Chorus of the Year	The Return	Won
2021	Duo/Group Chorus of the Year	The Return	Nominated
2021	Traditional Duo/Group Chorus of the Year	Gospel According to PJ	Won
2025	Albertina Walker Female Artist of the Year	Still Karen	Nominated
2025	Producer of the Year	Still Karen	Nominated
2025	Contemporary Album of the Year	Still Karen	Nominated
2026	Contemporary Duo/Chorus Group of the Year	"Jesus I Do" (with Mariah Carey)	Nominated

=== Miscellaneous honors ===
Year	Organization	Award	Nominated work	Result
1999	Michigan's International Gospel Music Hall of Fame		The Clark Sisters	Inducted
2019	Essence Fest's Strength Of A Woman Brunch	Strength of A Woman Award	The Clark Sisters	Honored
2022	Black Music & Entertainment Walk of Fame		The Clark Sisters	Inducted
2025	Gospel Music Hall of Fame Missouri		The Clark Sisters	Inducted
2026	Hollywood Walk of Fame		The Clark Sisters	Inducted
