= Bold Right Life =

Studio album by Kierra Sheard
- Released: 27 October 2008
- Genre: Gospel; R&B
- Length: 41:50
- Label: EMI Gospel
- Producer: Warryn "Baby Dubb" Campbell; Gerald Haddon; PAJAM; J. Drew Sheard; Asaph Ward

Kierra Sheard chronology
This Is Me (2006)	Bold Right Life (2008)	Free (2011)

Singles from Bold Right Life
- 1. "Praise Him Now" Released: August 2008; 2. "Won't Hold Back" Released: August 2008; 3. "Jesus" Released: December 2008; 4. "Love Like Crazy" Released: March 2009; 5. "Invisible" Released: May 2009

Bold Right Life is the third studio album by the American singer Kierra Sheard. It was released by EMI Gospel on 27 October 2008.

== Critical reception ==
Professional ratings
Review scores
Source	Rating
Cross Rhythms	9/10 stars

The AllMusic editor Pemberton Roach found that the album "reveals that the younger Clark is more than up to carrying on the family legacy. Produced by Kierra's Brother J. Drew, the album is a thoroughly modern slice of hip-hop-ish R&B, replete with skittering dance beats, funky bass lines, and vocals altered with all sorts of up-to-date computer effects. Sailing above it all are Sheard’s powerful and assured vocals, at once secularly soulful and full of the Spirit." Kenya M. Yarbrough of EURweb reviewed the album favorably.

== Accolades ==
The album was nominated for a Dove Award for Urban Album of the Year at the 40th GMA Dove Awards.

== Chart performance ==
Bold Right Life debuted and peaked at number 114 on the US Billboard 200. It also reached number three on the Top Gospel Albums and number none on the Top Christian Albums. The lead single, "Praise Him Now", peaked at number nine on the Hot Gospel Songs and "Love Like Crazy" reached number 57 on the Japan Hot 100.

== Track listing ==
No.	Title	Producer(s)	Length
1.	"Won't Hold Back"	J. Drew Sheard	3:45
2.	"Wave Your Banner" (featuring Mary Mary)	Warryn "Baby Dubb" Campbell	3:02
3.	"My Boyfriend"	J. Sheard	3:44
4.	"Invisible"	Gerald Haddon	3:41
5.	"Love Like Crazy"	Campbell	3:47
6.	"Like David"	Asaph Ward	3:25
7.	"Praise Him Now"	PAJAM	3:49
8.	"Oh Lord"	Ward	5:19
9.	"If It Had Not Been"	Campbell	3:06
10.	"One"	Campbell	3:28
11.	"Jesus"	J. Sheard	4:44

== Charts ==
=== Weekly charts ===
Chart (2008)	Peak position
US Billboard 200	114
US Top Christian Albums (Billboard)	9
US Top Gospel Albums (Billboard)	3

=== Year-end charts ===
Chart (2009)	Position
US Top Gospel Albums (Billboard)	31
