= Finally Karen =

Live album by Karen Clark Sheard
- Released: November 4, 1997
- Venue: Bailey Cathedral, Detroit, Michigan
- Genre: Gospel; contemporary gospel; R&B
- Length: 74:04
- Label: Island Black Music
- Producer: Donald Lawrence; Cedric Thompson; J. Moss; Paul D. Allen; Stanley Brown; Kowan Paul; Milton Thornton

Karen Clark Sheard chronology
Finally Karen (1997)	2nd Chance (2002)

Professional ratings
Review scores
Source	Rating
AllMusic	4/5 stars

Finally Karen is the debut solo album of gospel singer Karen Clark Sheard of the Clark Sisters, released on November 4, 1997. The live portion of the album was recorded at Bailey Cathedral in Detroit, Michigan, on November 15, 1996. The album was Grammy-nominated for Best Contemporary R&B Gospel Album in 1998. The song "The Will of God" launched the gospel career of her daughter Kierra "Kiki" Sheard, who won her first Stellar award from the strength of her vocal performance. Finally Karen also won the Lady of Soul award for Best Gospel Album the same year.

== Track listing ==
1. "Just for Me" – 4:39
2. "Nothing Without You" (featuring Faith Evans) – 4:52
3. "Praise Festival" – 3:48
4. "Unconditional (Mad Love)" – 4:37
5. "Gotta Right..." – 4:15
6. "Can't Take It" – 4:25
7. "Jesus Is a Love Song" (featuring The Clark Sisters) – 6:38
8. "Jesus Is a Love Song (Reprise)" – 2:56
9. "Balm in Gilead" – 6:33
10. "Holy, Thou Art Holy" – 7:42
11. "Heaven" (featuring Donald Lawrence) – 4:18
12. "Couldn't Tell It If I Tried" – 7:16
13. "A Praying Spirit" – 7:05
14. "The Will of God" (featuring Kierra Sheard) – 5:03

== Charts ==
=== Weekly charts ===
Weekly chart performance for Finally Karen
Chart (1997–1998)	Peak position
US Top Gospel Albums (Billboard)	2
US Heatseekers Albums (Billboard)	11
US Top R&B/Hip-Hop Albums (Billboard)	28

=== Year-end charts ===
1998 year-end chart performance for Finally Karen
Chart (1998)	Position
US Top Gospel Albums (Billboard)	7
US Top R&B/Hip-Hop Albums (Billboard)	97

1999 year-end chart performance for Finally Karen
Chart (1999)	Position
US Top Gospel Albums (Billboard)	24
