= I Owe You =

Studio album by Kierra "Kiki" Sheard
- Released: September 7, 2004
- Genre: Urban Gospel
- Length: 47:05
- Label: EMI Gospel
- Producer: Ken Pennell (exec.); Larry Blackwell (exec.); Warryn Campbell; Rodney Jerkins; LT Productions; Jazz Nixon; PAJAM; Tonéx

Kierra "Kiki" Sheard chronology
I Owe You (2004)	Just Until... (2005)

I Owe You is the debut studio album by American gospel singer Kierra "Kiki" Sheard. It was released by EMI Gospel on September 7, 2004 in the United States. Sheard worked with a variety of producers on the album, including Warryn Campbell, Rodney Jerkins, PAJAM, and Tonéx. I Owe You debuted atop the US Billboard Top Gospel Albums and the Heatseekers Albums. It also reached number four on the Top Christian Albums and number 29 on the Top R&B/Hip-Hop Albums.

== Critical reception ==
Professional ratings
Review scores
Source	Rating
Christianity Today	4.5/5 stars
Cross Rhythms	10/10

AllMusic editor Andree Farias found that I Owe You "can be so easily compartmentalized is not necessarily a sign of versatility, but an indicator that KiKi is merely following the lead of others. This is not a big deal in the case of debut albums, but the see-if-it-sticks mentality is ultimately too jarring to take in all at once. It's nice of Sheard to let herself be all things to all people, but here's hoping the follow-up to I Owe You is truly more her, not who her handlers want her to be." Tony Cummings from Cross Rhythms called the album a "staggering showcase for KiKi's sinuously flowing vocals brought into pristine focus by top quality R&B production from some of the biggest names in urban music."

== Accolades ==
I Owe You was nominated for three Stellar Awards, including Contemporary Female Vocalist of the Year, Urban Song of the Year, and Contemporary CD of the Year. Sheard was also nominated for multiple Soul Train Music Awards, an NAACP Image Award, and multiple Dove Awards.

== Track listing ==
I Owe You track listing
No.	Title	Writer(s)	Producer(s)	Length
1.	"You Don't Know"	Rodney Jerkins; Jazz Nixon; Fred Jerkins III; LaShawn Daniels; Delisha Thomas	Jerkins; Nixon	3:51
2.	"Let Go"	Eric Dawkins; Warryn Campbell; Erica Atkins; Trecina Atkins	Campbell	3:11
3.	"Church Nite"	James Moss	PAJAM	3:43
4.	"Closer"	Moss	PAJAM	4:23
5.	"Praise Offering"	Moss	PAJAM	4:56
6.	"Sweetest Thing"	J. Drew Sheard; Kierra Sheard; Earl Wright	LT Productions	5:07
7.	"War"	J. Sheard; K. Sheard; Wright	LT Productions	4:23
8.	"All I Am"	Harold Lilly; Campbell; E. Atkins; T. Atkins	Campbell	2:52
9.	"Done Did It"	Campbell; E. Atkins; T. Atkins	Campbell	3:42
10.	"So Long"	Allen; Moss; Brandon Holland; Byron Stanfield	PAJAM	4:02
11.	"Snap"	Dorothy Holmes; Anthony Williams; Roseanne Holmes	Tonéx	4:48
Total length:				47:05

== Charts ==
=== Weekly charts ===
Weekly chart performance for I Owe You
Chart (2004)	Peak position
US Billboard 200	115
US Christian Albums (Billboard)	4
US Heatseekers Albums (Billboard)	1
US Top Gospel Albums (Billboard)	1
US Top R&B/Hip-Hop Albums (Billboard)	29

=== Year-end charts ===
2004 year-end chart performance for I Owe You
Chart (2004)	Peak position
US Top Gospel Albums (Billboard)	32

2005 year-end chart performance for I Owe You
Chart (2005)	Peak position
US Top Gospel Albums (Billboard)	20
