= Donald Lawrence =

American musician (born 1961)

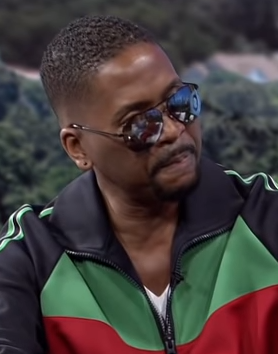
- Lawrence in 2018

Background information
- Born: May 4, 1961 (age 65); Gastonia
- Genres: Gospel music
- Occupations: Singer, songwriter, record producer, choir director, actor
- Years active: Mid 1980s-present
- Labels: GospoCentric, Reprise, Crystal Rose, Star Song, Island, EMI Gospel, Quiet Water Entertainment, Verity
- Website: donaldlawrence.com

Donald Lawrence (born May 4, 1961, Gastonia, North Carolina) is an American gospel music songwriter, record producer, composer, singer, and music arranger. He is best known for the songs he had created, in which had been known for their the blend of several genres and genre-influences. In the 2000s, his Grammy Award-nominated songs "The Blessing of Abraham" and "Encourage Yourself," became few of the most known "staples." He owns the record label, QuietWater Entertainment.

He studied at the University of Cincinnati College-Conservatory of Music (CCM), where he earned a Bachelor of Fine Arts degree in music. He has received multiple Grammy and Stellar Award honors and served as vocal coach to the R&B group En Vogue, the musical director for Stephanie Mills, songwriter for The Clark Sisters, and collaborator with a host of artists including Peabo Bryson, Kirk Franklin, Karen Clark Sheard, Donnie McClurkin, and Mary J. Blige.

== Career ==
Donald Lawrence began working with several gospel and non-gospel mainstream figures and musicians, during the mid and late 1980s. He eventually became the producer and music director for Stephanie Mills, which was prominent during the late 1980s. He took on The Tri-City Singers after a friend vacated his position as musical director. It was in this capacity, when Donald Lawrence decided to record music of his own compositions, songwriting, arranging, and singing, in which he sought in recording the debut album for the Tri-City Singers in 1991, before the debut was sold in early 1993. The three cities that The Tri-City Singers had resided in, were of Spartanburg, SC, Gastonia, NC, and Charlotte, NC. The debut record A Songwriter's Point Of View on a then-brand-new independent record label called GospoCentric Records. The set debuted at No. 2 on the Billboard Top Gospel Charts. The group's follow-up release Bible Stories would top those same charts when it arrived in 1995. It was the first to be billed as Donald Lawrence & The Tri-City Singers and featured black church-ubiquitous hits such as "A Message For The Saints", "I Am God" and "Stranger". The album was released on Lawrence's newly minted label Crystal Rose Records which was distributed through Sparrow Records.

In 1997, Donald Lawrence produced the live portion of Karen Clark Sheard's Grammy-nominated Finally Karen debut. Lawrence & Tri-City also released the seasonal Hello Christmas the same year. Later, Lawrence signed a contract with the Island Records imprint Island Inspirational. Though a live recording did take place for release, the album never materialized.

In 2000, Donald Lawrence & The Tri-City Singers signed to EMI Gospel. To promote the new album, a maxi CD of the lead single "Testify" to the mainstream. House remixes by Junior Vasquez sent the song to No. 33 on Billboard's Mainstream Dance Charts. When tri-city4.com was finally released in late summer 2000, the set peaked at #2 on Billboard's Top Gospel Charts and #13 on Billboard's Heatseekers Charts. The album also got a profile boost from the all-star standout "God's Favor", featuring vocal turns from Karen Clark Sheard, Kim Burrell, and Kelly Price.

Lawrence waited almost two years before delivering the follow-up Go Get Your Life Back in early 2002. "The Best Is Yet to Come", a song sonically much in the vein of the previous smash "Testify," was chosen as the album's lead single. This release featured guest appearances from Ann Nesby (formerly of Sounds of Blackness) and gospel pioneer Bishop Walter Hawkins. The momentum continued with the 2003 release of Restoring The Years, a greatest hits album featuring two new songs.

The next album would mark a fresh start for Donald Lawrence. I Speak Life was his first solo album, the debut for his newly inked recording contract with Verity Records, and also the first release under his new sublabel Quiet Water Entertainment. Though the album was without The Tri-City Singers, guest appearances were plenteous. Donnie McClurkin, Hezekiah Walker, Faith Evans, Richard Smallwood, and Carl Thomas all contributed to the album. Even jazz notables Ramsey Lewis and Lalah Hathaway were on hand for a remake of the Bible Stories classic "Don't Forget To Remember". The effort earned Lawrence a total of 7 Stellar Award nominations, and 6 wins.

In March 2006, The Tri-City Singers announced that they would retire, but not before one last live recording. Finale: Act One and Finale: Act Two were released simultaneously on April 4, 2006. Each release was a CD/DVD set that chronicled the audio and video of one half of the concert, with packages that locked into one another respectively. A special edition of Finale was later released with both CDs and DVDs. The blowout concert included guest appearances from Bishop Walter Hawkins, Karen Clark Sheard, Vanessa Bell Armstrong, Daryl Coley, LaShun Pace, Darwin Hobbs, and many other gospel luminaries. The album's lead single "The Blessing Of Abraham" was nominated for a Grammy Award for Best Gospel Performance in December 2006. His sophomore solo album, The Law of Confession Part I was released in February 2009. Soon after, Donald said in an interview that The Law of Confession, Part II would be released soon, but that he was focusing on other projects.

Donald Lawrence was featured on the title track "Released" by Bill Winston presents Living Word". He was also the host of Verizon's "How Sweet The Sound Choir Competition".

== Discography ==
=== Albums ===
Title	Album details	Chart positions		
Title	Album details	US	US Gospel	US Heat
A Songwriters Point Of View (as Director of The Tri-City Singers)	Released: March 9, 1993; Label: GospoCentric	-	-	2
Bible Stories (with The Tri-City Singers)	Released: June 20, 1995; Label: Crystal Rose	-	1	-
Hello Christmas (with The Tri-City Singers)	Released: October 7, 1997; Label: Star Song	-	7	-
tri-city4.com (with The Tri-City Singers)	Released: January 25, 2000; Label: EMI Gospel	-	2	13
Go Get Your Life Back (with The Tri-City Singers)	Released: March 26, 2002; Label: EMI Gospel	-	4	-
The Best of Donald Lawrence & the Tri-City Singers: Restoring the Years (with The Tri-City Singers)	Released: November 18, 2003; Label: EMI Gospel	-	21	-
I Speak Life	Released: September 28, 2004; Label: QWE/Verity	-	2	-
Finale: Act One (with The Tri-City Singers)	Released: April 4, 2006; Label: EMI Gospel	-	4	-
Finale: Act Two (with The Tri-City Singers)	Released: April 4, 2006; Label: EMI Gospel	-	5	-
The Law of Confession, Part I	Released: February 3, 2009; Label: Zomba/Verity Records; Formats: CD, digital download	72	2	-
YRM (Your Righteous Mind)	Released: August 9, 2011; Label: Zomba/Verity Records; Formats: CD, digital download	41	1	-
20 Year Celebration, Vol. 1: Best for Last (with The Tri-City Singers)	Released: September 24, 2013; Label: eOne; Formats: CD, digital download	-	1	-
Goshen (with The Tri-City Singers)	Released: February 1, 2019; Label: eOne; Formats: CD, digital download	-	-	-
Donald Lawrence Presents Power: A Tribute to Twinkie Clark	Released: September 15, 2023	-	-	-

=== Singles ===
- "Don't Give Up" with Kirk Franklin, Hezekiah Walker, and Karen Clark Sheard (Island, 1996)
- "Testify (Remixes)" (The Tri-City Singers) (EMI Gospel, 2001)
- "Never Seen The Righteous" (The Tri-City Singers) (EMI Gospel, 2002)
- "The Best Is Yet To Come" (The Tri-City Singers) (EMI Gospel, 2002)
- "The Blessing Of Abraham" (The Tri-City Singers) (EMI Gospel, 2006) (Billboard No. 97 R&B)
- "Back II Eden" (Donald Lawrence & Co.) (Zomba/Verity Records, 2009)
- "YRM (Your Righteous Mind" (Donald Lawrence & Co.) (Zomba/Verity Records, 2010)
- "Spiritual" (Donald Lawrence & Co.) (Zomba/Verity Records, 2011)
- "The Gift" (Donald Lawrence & Co.) (eOne Music, 2013)
- "Goshen 432HZ" (The Tri-City Singers) (Provident Label Group, 2018)

== Awards and nominations ==
=== Dove Awards ===
The Dove Awards are awarded annually by the Gospel Music Association. Lawrence has won 2 awards from 6 nominations.

Year	Nominated work	Award	Result
2001	Contemporary Gospel Album of the Year	Tri-city4.com	Nominated
2003	Contemporary Gospel Recorded Song of the Year	"The Best Is Yet To Come"	Nominated
2008	Contemporary Gospel Album of the Year	Live - One Last Time	Nominated
2019	Traditional Gospel Album of the Year	Goshen	Won
2019	Traditional Gospel Recorded Song of the Year	"Deliver Me (This is My Exodus)" (with Le'andria Johnson)	Won
2020	Song of the Year	"Deliver Me (This is My Exodus)"	Nominated

=== Grammy Awards ===
The Grammy Awards are awarded annually by the National Academy of Recording Arts and Sciences. Lawrence has won 1 award from 16 nominations.

Year	Nominated work	Award	Result
1996	Best Gospel Album By A Choir Or Chorus	Bible Stories	Nominated
2001	Best Gospel Choir Or Chorus Album	Tri-city4.com	Nominated
2003	Best Gospel Choir Or Chorus Album	Go Get Your Life Back	Nominated
2006	Best Gospel Choir Or Chorus Album	I Speak Life	Nominated
2007	Best Traditional Gospel Album	Finalé Act One	Nominated
2007	Best Gospel Song	"The Blessing of Abraham"	Nominated
2007	Best Gospel Performance	"The Blessing of Abraham"	Nominated
2008	Best Traditional Gospel Album	Live - One Last Time	Won
2008	Best Traditional Gospel Album	The Grand Finale: Encourage Yourself	Nominated
2008	Best Gospel Song	"Encourage Yourself"	Nominated
2010	Best Traditional Gospel Album	The Law of Confession, Part I	Nominated
2012	Best Gospel Song	"Spiritual" (with Blanche McAllister-Dykes)	Nominated
2013	Best Gospel Song	"Released" (with Bill Winston and Living Word)	Nominated
2014	Best Gospel Album	Best for Last: 20 Year Celebration Vol. 1 (Live)	Nominated
2015	Best Gospel Performance/Song	"Sunday A.M. (Live)" (with Rudy Currence)	Nominated
2020	Best Gospel Album	Goshen	Nominated
2025	Best Gospel Performance/Song	"Church Doors" (with Sir William James Baptist)	Nominated

=== NAACP Image Awards ===
The NAACP Image Awards are awarded annually by the National Association for the Advancement of Colored People (NAACP). Lawrence has been nominated 3 times.

Year	Nominated work	Award	Result
2014	Outstanding Gospel Album - (Traditional or Contemporary)	20 Year Celebration Volume 1 - Best For Last	Nominated
2021	Outstanding Soundtrack/Compilation Album	The First Ladies of Gospel: The Clark Sisters Biopic Soundtrack	Nominated
2021	Outstanding Producer of the Year	Himself	Nominated

=== Stellar Awards ===
The Stellar Awards are awarded annually by SAGMA. Lawrence has received 10 awards from 28 nominations.

Year	Nominated work	Award	Result
2007	Artist of the Year	Donald Lawrence presents The Tri-City Singers; Finale: Act One	Won
2007	Choir of the Year	Donald Lawrence presents The Tri-City Singers; Finale: Act One	Won
2007	Contemporary Choir of the Year	Donald Lawrence presents The Tri-City Singers; Finale: Act One	Won
2007	Contemporary CD of the Year	Donald Lawrence presents The Tri-City Singers; Finale: Act One	Won
2007	Music Video of the Year	Donald Lawrence presents The Tri-City Singers; Finale: Act One	Won
2007	Producer of the Year	Donald Lawrence presents The Tri-City Singers; Finale: Act One	Won
2007	Special Event CD of the Year	Donald Lawrence presents The Tri-City Singers; Finale: Act One	Won
2007	CD of the Year	Donald Lawrence presents The Tri-City Singers; Finale: Act One	Nominated
2008	Producer of the Year	Live - One Last Time	Won
2009	Producer of the Year	Donald Lawrence Introduces The Murrills Family Prayer	Nominated
2009	Recorded Music Package of the Year	Donald Lawrence Introduces The Murrills Family Prayer	Nominated
2010	Producer of the Year	The Law of Confession Part 1	Won
2010	Recorded Music Package of the Year	The Law of Confession Part 1	Won
2010	Artist of the Year	The Law of Confession Part 1	Nominated
2010	CD of the Year	The Law of Confession Part 1	Nominated
2010	Contemporary CD of the Year	The Law of Confession Part 1	Nominated
2010	Contemporary Group/Duo of the Year	The Law of Confession Part 1	Nominated
2010	Group Duo of the Year	The Law of Confession Part 1	Nominated
2010	Song of the Year	"Back II Eden"	Nominated
2010	Urban/Inspirational Single/Performance of the Year	"Let the Word Do the Work"	Nominated
2011	Producer of the Year	The Experience	Nominated
2013	Artist of the Year	YRM (Your Righteous Mind)	Nominated
2013	Contemporary CD of the Year	YRM (Your Righteous Mind)	Nominated
2013	Contemporary Group/Duo of the Year	YRM (Your Righteous Mind)	Nominated
2013	Group/Duo of the Year	YRM (Your Righteous Mind)	Nominated
2013	Producer of the Year	YRM (Your Righteous Mind)	Nominated
2014	Song of the Year	"Your Best Days Yet"	Nominated
2026	Producer of the Year	Global Love Alive (London) (with Cedric Thompson)	Pending
