= Kierra Sheard =

Kierra Sheard-Kelly
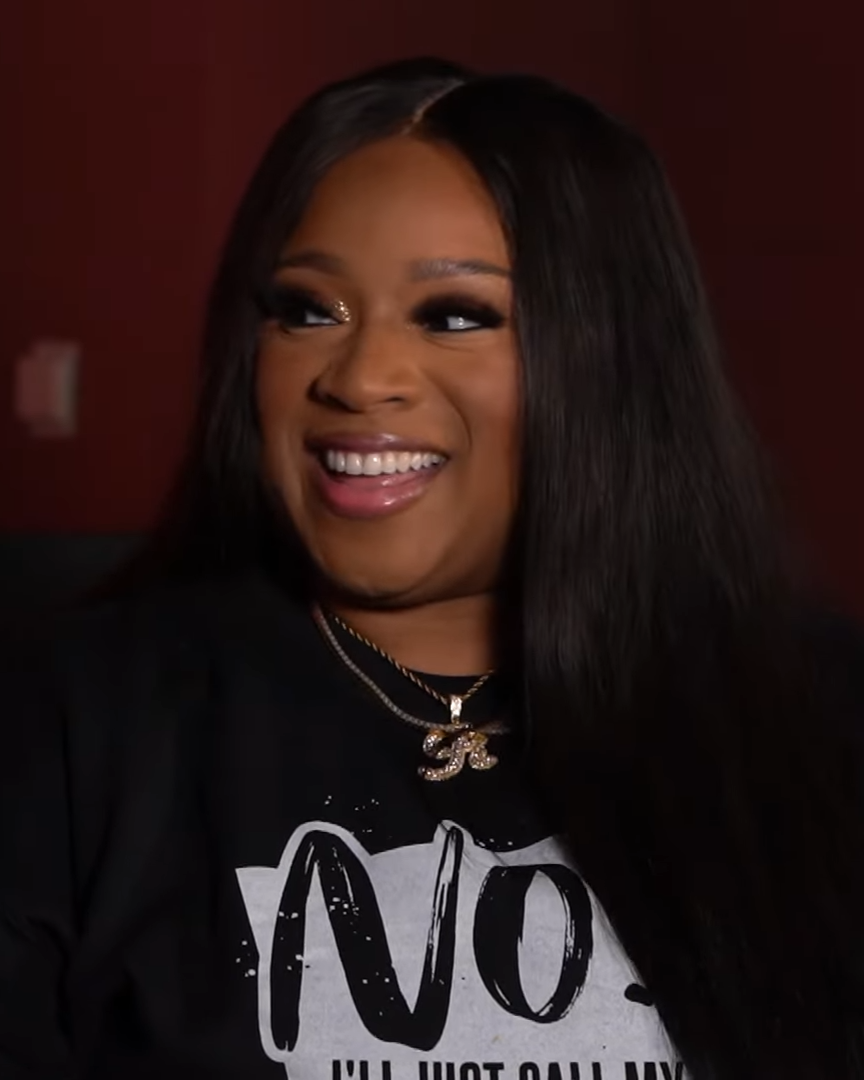
- Sheard-Kelly in 2023

Background information
- Also known as: Kiki; Kierra Sheard-Kelly
- Born: Kierra Valencia Sheard; June 20, 1987 (age 39): Detroit, Michigan, U.S.
- Genres: Urban gospel, R&B, CCM
- Occupations: Singer-songwriter; evangelist
- Instrument: Vocals
- Works: Kierra Sheard discography
- Years active: 1997–present
- Labels: Capitol Christian Music Group, EMI Gospel; Motown Gospel; Karew; RCA Inspiration
- Spouse: Jordan Kelly (2020–present)
- Website: www.iamkierrasheard.com

Kierra Valencia "Kiki" Sheard-Kelly (born June 20, 1987) is an American gospel singer and evangelist. She is the daughter of gospel singer Karen Clark-Sheard and COGIC Presiding Bishop J. Drew Sheard and the granddaughter of gospel choral director Mattie Moss Clark. After appearing on her mother's (most notably, the seminal Finally Karen) and aunt's albums, Sheard signed with EMI Gospel to release her debut studio album, I Owe You (2004). Its lead single, "You Don't Know", was inspired by her mother almost losing her life in 2001 to a fatal blood clot. Sheard portrayed her mother in the 2020 Lifetime film, The Clark Sisters: First Ladies of Gospel.

== Early life ==
Born in Detroit, Michigan, and raised in the suburb of West Bloomfield, Sheard spent her formative years surrounded by the influences of her family, their faith, and their music. At age 5, she began singing in the choir at Greater Emmanuel Institutional Church of God in Christ, pastored by her father, Bishop J. Drew Sheard.

== Music career ==
=== 1997–2003: Early career ===
Sheard made her professional recording debut at the age of 9, on her mother's debut solo album Finally Karen (1997). The song "The Will Of God" won a Stellar Award for Best Children's Performance. In the following years, Sheard performed as background vocalist for her mother, aunt Dorinda Clark-Cole and the Clark Sisters. In 2002, Sheard was featured on Clark-Cole's self-titled debut album. In 2003, she featured on her mother's third album, The Heavens Are Telling, on "You Loved Me" (a gospel cover of Jill Scott's "He Loves Me (Lyzel In E Flat)") and alongside J Moss on "Don't Change". That same year, EMI Gospel won a bidding war among several record companies to sign Sheard.

=== 2004–2005: I Owe You ===
Her debut album I Owe You was released on September 7, 2004. The 11-track set included production and songwriting from Rodney Jerkins, Warryn Campbell, Erica and Tina Campbell of Mary Mary, Sheard's cousin J Moss, and Tonéx. The album also functioned as the production debut for her brother J Drew. With the release of I Owe You, Sheard became the first new artist in Billboard history to debut at number one on the Top Gospel Albums chart.

EMI commissioned a collection of remixes entitled Just Until... on August 2, 2005. The title of the stopgap release was abbreviated from its working title, "Just Until The Next Record". The album had a surprise international hit in the Godson Concept remix of "Let Go". The upbeat gospel single, released only in Japan, raced to the top of the mainstream R&B charts and remained there for several weeks.

=== 2006–2007: This is Me ===
Shortly after graduating high school, Sheard readied her second album, This Is Me. It debuted at No. 1 on Billboard's Top Gospel Albums chart when it was released on June 27, 2006. A midtempo fan favorite, the Fred Jerkins III-produced "Why Me?" was chosen as the lead single for the album. Sheard shot her first music videos for two subsequent singles from the album, "Yes" and "This Is Me". The album was Grammy Award-nominated for Best Contemporary R&B Gospel Album in December 2006.

In addition to performing at the 2007 Stellar Awards ("Why Me?"), Sheard appeared on BET's Celebration of Gospel, standing in for pregnant Faith Evans in "Endow Me" (as popularized by Sheard's mother and aunts) along with Coko, Lil' Mo, and Fantasia. Sheard also sang with her mother for A Tribute to Aretha Franklin.

=== 2008–2009: Bold Right Life ===
In 2008, Sheard featured on Mary Mary's crossover hit, "God in Me", from The Sound album. "God in Me" became Sheard's first appearance on the US Hot 100, where it peaked at number 68. Furthermore, the single broke the Billboard record for the longest chart-run by a group and longest chart-run by a gospel song on the Hot R&B/Hip-Hop Songs chart, where it spent a total of 74 weeks and peaked at number 5. "God in Me" was also a major hit on Billboard's Dance Club and Hot Gospel Songs charts, peaking at number one on both and spending 7 consecutive weeks atop the latter. Further to this, "God in Me" was awarded for "Outstanding Song" at the 41st NAACP Image Awards.

In October 2008, Sheard released her third album, Bold Right Life. Named after Sheard's youth organization in Detroit, the album was described by Billboard as a 'powerful mix of R&B/hip-hop, pop, rock and traditional gospel' which 'shifts from a hot uptempo beat (opener “Won’t Hold Back”) to pop (“My Boyfriend”) then to rock (“Invisible”) and traditional (“Praise Him Now”)'. The album's two lead singles were "Praise Him Now" and "Won't Hold Back". "Praise Him Now" peaked at number 7 on the US Hot Gospel Songs chart, whilst "Love Like Crazy" became Sheard's second Japanese hit, peaking at number 7 on the Japan Hot 100.

In January 2009, Sheard performed the Clark Sisters' "Jesus Is a Love Song" at the BMI Trailblazers Luncheon in honor of her aunt Elbernita "Twinkie" Clark.

The same year, Sheard released a compilation, KiKi's Mixtape, on September 22, 2009. KiKi's Mixtape included two new songs - “Sing to the Lord”, co-written by Kierra and described as 'a high-octane amalgam of rock, CCR and power pop' and a 'bold and bracing' cover of Donny Hathaway's "This Christmas" with Marcus Cole.

=== 2010–2013: Free and The Sheards ===
Sheard had a role in the film Preacher's Kid (starring platinum-selling R&B artist LeToya Luckett, Durrell Babbs, Clifton Powell, Gregory Alan Williams, and Sharif Atkins), which was released in theaters across the U.S. on January 29, 2010, and was released on DVD and Blu-ray disc on May 4, 2010.

Sheard's fourth album, Free, was released on October 18, 2011. This was her first album on her family's gospel label, Karew Records (pronounced Kuh-Rue). Originally scheduled for a July 12, 2011 release, the album was leaked and subsequently pushed back and reformatted with a different track listing. The album features Sheard's BRL (Bold Right Life) Choir.

On April 7, 2013, Sheard and her family debuted in a new BET reality series, The Sheards. The show is based on the lives of Sheard, her brother and producer J. Drew, and her parents, Grammy Award-winning Karen Clark Sheard and Pastor J. Drew Sheard Sr. Season 1 had a run of eight episodes, and it was announced on the BET Twitter account that Season 2 would debut in the fall of 2014.

=== 2013–present: Graceland, Clark Sisters biopic and Kierra ===
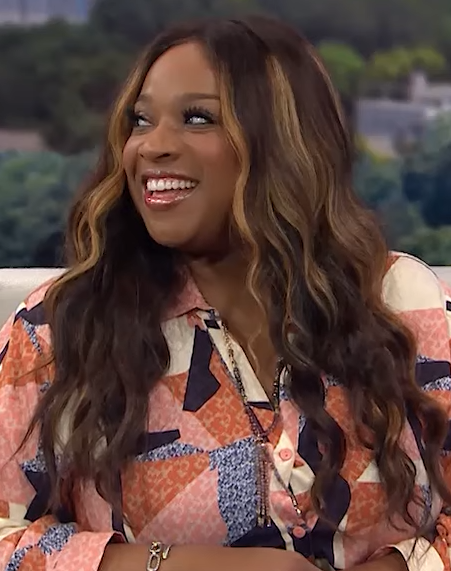
Sheard-Kelly in 2019

Sheard released the single "Trumpets Blow" in 2013, which was followed by "2nd Win" in 2014, which peaked within the top 20 of Billboard's Top Gospel Songs chart. Shortly after in 2014, her fifth album Graceland, was released on June 22, 2014. Graceland became her second top 40 appearance on the Billboard 200 and fourth number one on the Top Gospel Albums chart. Graceland also earned Sheard a nomination for Contemporary Female Vocalist of the Year at the 30th Annual Stellar Awards.

In 2020, a Lifetime biographical film, The Clark Sisters: First Ladies of Gospel was released, starring Kierra Sheard as her mother Karen Clark-Sheard, which became the highest rated original movie release by Lifetime in four years. The film's soundtrack, also starring Sheard, debuted at number 8 on the Billboard Top Gospel Albums chart, where it remained in its second week.

Following this, Sheard released her sixth album Kierra. Debuting at number one on the Billboard Top Gospel Albums chart with 6,000 equivalent album units, it became her fifth chart-topping album, replacing Kanye West's Jesus is King which had held the number one spot for 6 months since November 9, 2019. Sheard co-wrote the entire album, which includes a mix of studio and live tracks recorded in her hometown, Detroit. The album spawned 3 top 20 singles on the Hot Gospel Songs chart; "Don't Judge Me", "It Keeps Happening" and "Something Has To Break" (featuring Tasha Cobbs Leonard), the latter peaking at number 5.

In April 2021, Sheard was featured on actor and rapper, Nick Cannon's rendition of Fred Hammond's gospel classic, No Weapon. In October 2021, Kierra's "Something Has to Break," featuring her mother, Karen Clark-Sheard, peaked at number one on the Hot Gospel Airplay chart, making it her fourth song to top the chart. Billboard explained, 'Kierra ties for the third-most Gospel Airplay No. 1s among women, dating to the chart's 2005 inception, matching Tasha Cobbs Leonard. Tamela Mann leads and shares the overall mark with Kirk Franklin (eight No. 1s), while Jekalyn Carr has notched five.'

== Personal life ==
Sheard is a graduate of Wayne State University (her father's alma mater) in Detroit, Michigan, where she received her bachelor's degree in English with a minor in psychology. Though her touring schedule has been curbed to accommodate her academic goals, Sheard did embark on a Japanese tour with her mother Karen Clark-Sheard in August 2006. In 2013, Sheard began preaching at her father's church and others. In 2017, she was officially licensed in the COGIC as an evangelist.

In June 2015, Sheard released the Fall/Winter collection of Eleven60, which honors her mother, Karen Clark Sheard. Eleven60 is named for the month and year that Clark Sheard was born. Sheard has personally designed looks for the professional curvy woman that is chic, sexy, bold and eclectic. She has crisscrossed the globe and absorbed the fashion trends of New York City, London, Paris, Tokyo and Seoul.

In 2020, after releasing three singles "Don't Judge Me (ft. Missy Elliot)", "It Keeps Happening", and "Something has to Break" (Ft. Tasha Cobbs Leonard, later her mother Karen Clark Sheard on the remix) she released her live self-titled Kierra, produced by her brother and producer J. Drew Sheard.

On June 20, 2020, her 33rd birthday, Sheard became engaged to her fiancé Jordan Kelly. The two married in a private ceremony on December 12 of that same year.

In April 2021 Sheard's first book titled Big, Bold and Beautiful: Owning the Woman God Made You to Be was released (a book for young teens and young adults).

In May 2023, Kelly's second book titled The Vibes You Feel: What I've Learned About Life and Relationships Through The Holy Spirit was set to be released.

Sheard and her husband announced in May 2023 that they were expecting their first child, a baby girl.

== Discography ==
- I Owe You (2004)
- This Is Me (2006)
- Bold Right Life (2008)
- Free (2011)
- Graceland (2014)
- Kierra (2020)
- All Yours (2023)

== Awards ==
=== BET Awards ===
The BET Awards are awarded annually by the Black Entertainment Television network. Sheard-Kelly has received 1 award from 2 nominations.

Year	Award	Nominated work	Result
2023	Dr. Bobby Jones Best Gospel/Inspirational Award	"The Better Benediction (Pt.2)" (with PJ Morton, Lisa Knowles-Smith, Le'Andria Johnson, Keke Wyatt, and Tasha Cobbs Leonard)	Nominated
2025	Dr. Bobby Jones Best Gospel/Inspirational Award	"Rain Down On Me" (with GloRilla, Kirk Franklin and Maverick City Music)	Won

=== Billboard Music Awards ===
The Billboard Music Awards are awarded annually. Sheard-Kelly has received 2 nominations.

Year	Award	Nominated work	Result
2017	Top Gospel Song	"Put a Praise On It" (with Tasha Cobbs Leonard)	Nominated
2021	Top Gospel Album	Kierra	Nominated

=== BMI Trailblazers of Gospel Music Awards ===
The BMI Trailblazers of Gospel Music Awards are awarded annually. Sheard-Kelly has been recognized seven times and honored three times.

Year	Award	Nominated work	Result
2022	Songwriter of the Most-Performed Songs of the Year	"His Love"	Recognized
2022	Songwriter of the Most-Performed Songs of the Year	"It Keeps Happening"	Recognized
2022	Songwriter of the Year	Herself	Honored
2023	Songwriter of the Most-Performed Songs of the Year	"Something Has to Break"	Recognized
2024	Songwriter of the Most-Performed Songs of the Year	"Miracles"	Recognized
2026	Songwriter of the Most-Performed Songs of the Year	"All Yours"	Recognized
2026	Songwriter of the Most-Performed Songs of the Year	"RAIN DOWN ON ME"	Recognized
2026	Songwriter of the Most-Performed Songs of the Year	"Send It Down"	Recognized
2026	Impact Award	Herself	Honored
2026	Songwriter of the Year	Herself	Honored

=== Dove Awards ===
The Dove Awards are awarded annually by the Gospel Music Association. Sheard-Kelly has won 3 awards from 13 nominations.

Year	Award	Nominated work	Result
2005	Urban Recorded Song of the Year	"You Don't Know"	Won
2005	Urban Album of the Year	I Owe You	Nominated
2006	Urban Album of the Year	Just Until	Nominated
2007	Urban Album of the Year	This Is Me	Won
2007	Urban Recorded Song of the Year	"Why Me"	Nominated
2009	Urban Album of the Year	Bold Right Life	Nominated
2015	Contemporary Gospel/Urban Album of the Year	Graceland	Nominated
2015	Contemporary Gospel/Urban Song of the Year	"Flaws"	Nominated
2020	Contemporary Gospel Album of the Year	KIERRA	Nominated
2020	Traditional Gospel Recorded Song of the Year	"It Keeps Happening"	Nominated
2020	Gospel Worship Recorded Song of the Year	"Something Has To Break (Live)" (featuring Tasha Cobbs Leonard)	Won
2023	Contemporary Gospel Recorded Song of the Year	"Miracles" (feat. Pastor Mike Jr.)	Nominated
2024	Gospel Worship Recorded Song of the Year	"All Yours" (feat. Anthony Brown)	Nominated

=== Grammy Awards ===
The Grammy Awards are awarded annually by the National Academy of Recording Arts and Sciences. Sheard-Kelly has received 4 nominations.

Year	Award	Nominated work	Result
2006	Best Contemporary R&B Gospel Album	This Is Me	Nominated
2009	Best Contemporary R&B Gospel Album	Bold Right Life	Nominated
2021	Best Gospel Album	Kierra	Nominated
2024	Best Gospel Performance/Song	"God is Good"	Nominated

=== NAACP Image Awards ===
The NAACP Image Awards are presented by the NAACP. Sheard-Kelly has received 1 award from 6 nominations.

Year	Award	Nominated work	Result
2021	Outstanding Gospel/Christian Album	Kierra	Nominated
2021	"Something Has To Break"	Outstanding Gospel/Christian Song	Nominated
2024	Outstanding Duo, Group or Collaboration (Traditional)	"God Is Good" (with Karen Clark Sheard and Hezekiah Walker)	Nominated
2024	Outstanding Gospel/Christian Album	All Yours	Nominated
2024	Outstanding Gospel/Christian Song	"All Yours" (featuring Anthony Brown)	Won
2025	Outstanding Duo, Group or Collaboration (Contemporary)	"Rain Down On Me" (with GloRilla, Kirk Franklin, Maverick City Music, and Chandler Moore)	Nominated

=== Soul Train Awards ===
The Soul Train Music Awards are awarded annually. Sheard-Kelly has received 3 nominations.

Year	Award	Nominated work	Result
Soul Train Music Awards
2005	Best Gospel Album	I Owe You	Nominated
2009	Best Collaboration	"God In Me" (with Mary Mary)	Nominated
Soul Train Lady of Soul Awards
2005	Best Gospel Album	I Owe You	Nominated

=== Stellar Awards ===
The Stellar Awards are awarded annually by SAGMA. Sheard-Kelly has received 7 awards from 25 nominations.

Year	Award	Nominated work	Result
1999	Children's Performance of the Year	"The Will of God" (Finally Karen)	Won
2006	Contemporary Female Vocalist of the Year	I Owe You	Won
2006	Contemporary CD of the Year	I Owe You	Nominated
2006	Urban/Inspirational Single/Performance of the Year	"You Don't Know"	Nominated
2007	Female Vocalist of the Year	This Is Me	Nominated
2007	Urban/Inspirational Single/Performance of the Year	"This Is Me"	Nominated
2010	Artist of the Year	Bold Right Life	Nominated
2010	Contemporary CD of the Year	Bold Right Life	Nominated
2010	Contemporary Female of the Year	Bold Right Life	Nominated
2010	Female Vocalist of the Year	Bold Right Life	Nominated
2010	Special Event CD of the Year	Silky Soul Music... An All-Star Tribute to Maze (with The Clark Sisters and J. Moss)	Won
2013	Contemporary Female of the Year	Free	Nominated
2013	Albertina Walker Female Vocalist of the Year	Free	Won
2015	Contemporary Female Vocalist of the Year	Graceland	Nominated
2018	Song of the Year	"Hang On" (with GEI)	Nominated
2020	Contemporary Female Vocalist of the Year	"Don't Judge Me"	Nominated
2021	Artist of the Year	Kierra	Nominated
2021	Albernita Walker Female Artist of the Year	Kierra	Nominated
2021	Contemporary Album of the Year	Kierra	Won
2021	Contemporary Female Artist of the Year	Kierra	Nominated
2021	Urban/Inspirational Single or Performance of the Year	"It Keeps Happening (Live)"	Nominated
2021	Song of the Year	"Something Has to Break (Live)" (feat. Tasha Cobbs Leonard)	Won
2024	Albertina Walker Female Artist of the Year	All Yours	Nominated
2024	Contemporary Female Artist of the Year	All Yours	Won
2026	HBCU Choir of the Year	Howard Gospel Choir of Howard University (with Damien Sneed & The Levites)	Nominated
