= Hezekiah Walker =

American gospel singer (born 1962)

Bishop Hezekiah Walker
- Also known as: "Hez"; "Hezzie"
- Born: Hezekiah Xzavier Walker Jr. December 24, 1962 (age 63)
- Origin: Brooklyn, New York
- Genres: Gospel
- Occupations: Writer; director; minister
- Years active: 1985–present
- Labels: Benson Records; Verity Records

Hezekiah Xzavier Walker Jr. (born December 24, 1962) is an American gospel music artist and the pastor of Love Fellowship Tabernacle in Brooklyn, New York. Walker has released several albums on Benson Records and Verity Records as Hezekiah Walker & The Love Fellowship Crusade Choir.

== Biography ==
Hezekiah Xzavier Walker Jr. was born in Brooklyn, New York. He attended Long Island University, majoring in Sociology. He also attended Hugee Theological Institute, and the New York School of the Bible. Walker was ordained a bishop in the Church of Our Lord Jesus Christ of the Apostolic Faith in 2008, by the late Chief Apostle William L. Bonner, with his bishopric affirmed by his pastor, the late Bishop Kenneth H. Moales, Sr of the Pentecostal Churches of Jesus Christ later that year. Walker became the Presiding Prelate of the Pentecostal Churches of Jesus Christ in 2010, upon the passing of Bishop Moales.

In 2001, Hezekiah & The LFT Church Choir were nominated for an NAACP Image Award for Best Gospel Artist, Traditional on the strength of the album Love Is Live! Walker has won Grammy Awards for Best Gospel Album By Choir Or Chorus twice: once for Live in Atlanta at Morehouse College (1994) with The Love Fellowship Crusade Choir, and once for Love Is Live! (2001) with The LFT Church Choir.

Separate from The Love Fellowship Crusade Choir, Walker's LFT Church Choir released two albums entitled Recorded Live At Love Fellowship Tabernacle in 1998 and "Love Is Live" in 2001. LFT Church Choir was a more youthful and hip-hop leaning ensemble than its predecessor and its album hit the Top 5 of Billboard's Gospel Chart, and was nominated for a Grammy Award the same year.

In 2021, Pastor Frank Santora, of Faith Church in New Milford, Connecticut, and Hezekiah Walker joined together to start a church in Times Square, New York City, called Every Tribe Church. Hezekiah Walker was inducted into Phi Beta Sigma fraternity as an honorary member at their 2023 Conclave, held in Houston, Texas.

== Discography ==
=== Albums ===
- I'll Make It (Sweet Rain, 1987)
- Oh Lord We Praise You (Sweet Rain, 1990)
- Focus on Glory (A&M, 1992)
- Live in Toronto (Benson, 1993)
- Live in Atlanta at Morehouse College (Benson, 1994)
- Live in New York by Any Means... (Benson, 1995)
- Live in London (Verity, 1997)
- Recorded Live at Love Fellowship Tabernacle (Verity, 1998) – by Hezekiah Walker & The LFT Church Choir
- Family Affair (Verity, 1999)
- Love Is Live! (Verity, 2001) - by Hezekiah Walker & The LFT Church Choir
- Family Affair, Vol. 2: Live at Radio City Music Hall (Verity, 2002)
- 20/85 The Experience (Verity, 2005)
- Souled Out (Verity, 2008)
- Azusa: The Next Generation (RCA Inspiration, 2013)
- Azusa: The Next Generation 2 – Better (Entertainment One Music, 2016)

=== Compilations ===
- Gospel Greats (Benson, 1995)
- Nothing But The Hits (Verity, 2003)
- Divine Voices: Pastors of Praise (Mack Avenue, 2015)

=== Singles ===
- "99½" (Benson, 1995) – Cassette Single
- "Let's Dance" (Jive/Verity, 1999) – CD Single/12" Single
- "Souled Out" (Verity, 2008) – Digital download Single
- "Every Praise" (RCA Inspirational, 2013) – Digital download Single
