= J. Moss =

American musician (born 1971)

- Born: James Lorell Moss; September 22, 1971 (age 55)
- Origin: Detroit, Michigan, U.S.
- Genres: Christian R&B; gospel; hip hop soul
- Occupations: Singer-songwriter; record producer; arranger; pastor
- Years active: 1996–present
- Labels: Milleni Era; Island Inspirational; GospoCentric
- Member of: PAJAM

James Lorell Moss (born September 22, 1971) is an American gospel singer, record producer, arranger and pastor.

== Early life ==
Born and raised in Detroit, Michigan, James Moss went to Cass Technical High School, the son of Gospel singer Bill Moss, Sr., and nephew of choir master Mattie Moss Clark. Moss spent much of his childhood on tours with his father's popular group, Bill Moss and the Celestials, and his cousins' group The Clark Sisters.

As an early teen, Moss was teamed with his brother Bill Moss, Jr. in the singing duo The Moss Brothers. They toured on weekends around the midwest and recorded two major label albums during their seven years together.

In this period James developed as a keyboardist and burgeoning songwriter. He was also learning first-hand the business of music. He attended Michigan State University for two years, but the desire to write and perform was too strong, and he left to seek a career in music.

== Music career ==
=== Beginnings ===
Upon his return to Detroit, Moss signed with a small local Christian label Aviday Records and released two albums to little fanfare. Yet, during this time he became acquainted with Paul Allen and Walter Kearney. The three began working together as PAJAM. Moss spent the mid-90s touring with The Clark Sisters and was signed, along with Karen Clark-Sheard, his cousin, to Island Records in 1996 to record a solo album. While a proper release never materialized for Moss before Island Black Music shut its doors, Clark's became a smash and introduced the Gospel world to the production powerhouse of PAJAM.

=== The J. Moss Project ===
Over the next seven years, the PAJAM team became Gospel music's most prolific hitmakers. However, Moss' desire to perform never went away, and in 2003 he and Allen began writing songs for what would ultimately become The J. Moss Project, released in September 2005 on GospoCentric Records.

Though PAJAM's work has been seen as a revolutionary blend of gospel and hip-hop style, The J. Moss Project is a surprisingly traditional affair. The set largely relies on familiar arrangements, and keeps its focus on Moss's clear tenor voice and strong backing choir vocals. The album made a grand entry with the upbeat lead single "I Wanna Be".

The disc includes a number of upbeat gospel numbers such as "Don't Pray and Worry" and "Psalm 150". J. Moss' lithe falsetto at times draws comparison to the likes of Prince and Tonéx on "Livin' 4". There are also several gentle ballads such as "Give You More" and the album's anthemic single "We Must Praise" that display J. Moss' range as a vocalist and songwriter.

=== V2... ===
On April 3, 2007, after several delays, J Moss released his second album V2... through GospoCentric Records. Appearances were made by contemporary Gospel group 21:03, Moss's cousin Kierra "Kiki" Sheard, Kirk Franklin, his cousin Karen Clark-Sheard, Marvin Winans of the famed Winans family, Byron Cage, Anthony Hamilton and American comedian, radio and television host Steve Harvey. Three bonus tracks ("Florida", "73 Degrees", and "Everybody Ain't Got a Word") were originally thought to be regular album tracks.

=== Just James ===
J. Moss released his third album Just James on August 25, 2009. The album spawned two gospel hits, the double A-side "Restored/I Gave It Up" and "Rebuild" and its 2010 remix single.

=== V4...The Other Side ===
J. Moss released his fourth album V4...The Other Side on July 31, 2012, with songs "God's Got It", "The Other Side of Victory" "The Prayers" featuring Hezekiah Walker and Dorinda Clark-Cole, and the radio hit "Good and Bad".

=== Grown Folks Gospel ===
In 2014, J. Moss released his fifth album Grown Folks Gospel, which features Faith Evans, Fred Hammond, PJ Morton, 21:03 and the late Wayman Tisdale! The album includes the radio hit "Faith".

=== GFG Reload ===
On January 29, 2016, J. Moss released his sixth project, which includes a few favorites from the Grown Folks Gospel album, as well as a few new songs.

== Discography ==
=== Albums ===
- The J. Moss Project (GospoCentric/Zomba, 2004)
- V2... (GospoCentric/Zomba, 2007)
- Just James (GospoCentric/Jive/Verity, 2009)
- Remixed, Rare & Unreleashed (GospoCentric/Jive/Verity, 2010)
- V4...The Other Side (Verity/RCA, 2012)
- Grown Folks Gospel (Central South, 2014)
- GFG Reload (Central South, 2016)

=== Singles ===
- "We Must Praise"
- "Psalm 150"
- "Operator"
- "Praise On the Inside"
- "I'm Not Perfect" (featuring Anthony Hamilton)
- "Abundantly"
- "Restored"
- "I Gave It Up"
- "Rebuild"
- "Rebuild: The Remix"
- "The Prayers" (featuring Hezekiah Walker & LFC)
- "Good & Bad"
- "God's Got It"
- "Alright OK"
- "Beyond My Reach"
- "Faith"
- "Rush On It"

== See also ==
- PAJAM
