= Xscape discography =

- Studio albums: 3
- Extended plays: 1
- Compilation albums: 2
- Singles: 20
- Music videos: 16

American girl group Xscape has released three studio albums, two compilation albums, one extended play, and twenty singles, including four as featured artists.

Xscape first charted in August 1993, and released their debut album Hummin' Comin' at 'Cha in the United States in October 1993 and it peaked at number 17 on the Billboard 200. It earned a platinum certification in the United States by the Recording Industry Association of America (RIAA). The album's lead single "Just Kickin' It" reached number two on the Billboard Hot 100 and was certified double platinum. The album's second single "Understanding" peaked in the top-ten on Billboard's Hot 100 and was certified platinum by the RIAA. The group's second album, Off the Hook, was released in July 1995. The album's first two singles, "Feels So Good" and "Who Can I Run To", peaked in the top-ten on the US Billboard Hot 100. The album sold over one million copies in the United States, gaining platinum certification by the RIAA.

The group's third album, Traces of My Lipstick, was released in the spring of 1998 and reached number 28 on Billboard 200. The first two singles, "The Arms of the One Who Loves You" and "My Little Secret" reached the top ten in the United States and earned gold certification by the RIAA. As of 2023, Xscape has sold over 12 million records in the US alone.

== Albums ==
=== Studio albums ===
List of studio albums, with selected chart positions and certifications
Title	Album details	Peak chart positions				Certifications
Title	Album details	US	US R&B /HH	UK	UK R&B	Certifications
Hummin' Comin' at 'Cha	Released: October 12, 1993; Label: So So Def/Columbia; Formats: CD, LP, Cassette, digital download, streaming	17	3	—	—	RIAA: Platinum
Off the Hook	Released: July 11, 1995; Label: So So Def/Columbia; Formats: CD, LP, Cassette, digital download, streaming	23	3	127	19	RIAA: Platinum
Traces of My Lipstick	Released: May 12, 1998; Label: So So Def/Columbia; Formats: CD, LP, Cassette, digital download, streaming	28	6	181	22	RIAA: Platinum
"—" denotes items that did not chart or were not released in that territory.

=== Compilation albums ===
List of compilation albums, with selected chart positions
Title	Details
Understanding	Released: December 22, 2002; Label: Sony Music; Format: CD
Super Hits	Released: February 24, 2009; Label: Sony Music; Format: CD

== Extended plays ==
List of extended plays
Title	Details
Here for It	Released: March 2, 2018; Label: RedZone Entertainment; Formats: Digital download, streaming

== Singles ==
=== As lead artists ===
Year	Single	Peak chart positions						Certifications (sales thresholds)	Album
Year	Single	US	US R&B	AUS	NZ	SCO	UK	Certifications (sales thresholds)	Album
1993	"Just Kickin' It"	2	1	54	22	—	49	RIAA: 2× Platinum	Hummin' Comin' at 'Cha
1993	"Understanding"	8	1	—	24	—	—	RIAA: Platinum	Hummin' Comin' at 'Cha
1994	"Is My Living in Vain"	—	— (Note: Did not chart on Hot R&B/Hip-Hop Songs chart (Billboard rules at the time prevented album cuts from charting). Charted at 47 on the Hot R&B/Hip-Hop Airplay chart.)	—	—	—	—	—	Hummin' Comin' at 'Cha
1994	"Love on My Mind"	46	16	—	—	—	—	—	Hummin' Comin' at 'Cha
1994	"Tonight"	—	59	—	—	—	—	—	Hummin' Comin' at 'Cha
1994	"Just Kickin' It" (re-release)	—	—	—	—	—	54	—	Hummin' Comin' at 'Cha
1995	"Feels So Good"	32	8	—	24	78	34	RIAA: Gold	Off the Hook
1995	"Who Can I Run To"	8	1	—	23	85	31	RIAA: Platinum	Off the Hook
1996	"Do You Want To"	50	9	—	—	—	—	RIAA: Gold	Off the Hook
1996	"Can't Hang" (featuring MC Lyte)	50	9	—	—	—	—	—	Off the Hook
1998	"The Arms of the One Who Loves You"	7	4	—	16	87	46	RIAA: Gold	Traces of My Lipstick
1998	"My Little Secret"	9	2	—	—	—	—	RIAA: Platinum	Traces of My Lipstick
1998	"Softest Place on Earth"	—	28	—	—	—	—	RIAA: Gold	Traces of My Lipstick
2005	"What's Up"	—	—	—	—	—	—	—	non-album single
2017	"Wifed Up"	—	—	—	—	—	—	—	Here for It
2017	"Dream Killa"	—	—	—	—	—	—	—	Here for It

=== As featured artists ===
Year	Title	Artist	Peak chart positions										Certifications (sales threshold)	Album
Year	Title	Artist	US	US R&B	US Rap	AUS	GER	NLD	NZ	SWE	SWI	UK	Certifications (sales threshold)	Album
1995	"Freedom" (Theme from Panther)	Various artists	45	18	—	—	—	—	—	—	—	—	—	Panther
1996	"Keep On, Keepin' On"	MC Lyte	10	3	2	—	32	38	18	29	41	27	RIAA: Gold	Sunset Park (soundtrack)
1997	"Am I Dreamin'"	Ol' Skool with Keith Sweat	31	5	—	—	—	—	—	—	—	—	—	Ol' Skool
2000	"Bounce with Me"	Lil' Bow Wow w/ Jermaine Dupri	20	1	1	48	—	—	—	—	—	—	—	Beware of Dog

== Soundtrack appearances ==
Year	Song	Film
1994	"Who's That Man"	The Mask
1995	"Work Me Slow"	Bad Boys
1995	"Freedom (Theme from Panther)" (with Various Artists)	Panther
1995	"Let Me Know"	The Baby-Sitters Club
1996	"Keep On, Keepin' On" (MC Lyte feat. Xscape)	Sunset Park
1997	"In the Rain"	Love Jones
1997	"Let's Do It Again"	Soul Food
1997	"How Do You Love Someone"	Living Single: Music from & Inspired by the Hit TV Show
2000	"Bounce With Me" (Lil Bow Wow feat. Xscape)	Big Momma's House
2001	"Rest of My Life"	Hardball

== Album appearances ==
Year	Song	Album
1996	"Christmas Without You" (Jermaine Dupri feat. Xscape)	12 Soulful Nights of Christmas
1996	"Always Be My Baby (Mr. Dupri Mix)" (Mariah Carey feat. Xscape and Da Brat)	The Remixes
1997	"Am I Dreamin'" (Ol' Skool feat. Xscape)	Ol' Skool
2000	"Bounce with Me" (Lil Bow Wow feat. Xscape)	Beware of Dog
2001	"Rock With Me" (Jermaine Dupri feat. Xscape)	Instructions

== Music videos ==
Year	Title	Director
1993	"Just Kickin' It"	Jeff Byrd
1993	"Understanding"	Otis Sallid
1994	"Love on My Mind"	Millicent Shelton
1994	"Tonight"	Rich Murray
1994	"Who's That Man"	Otis Sallid
1994	"Just Kickin' It (Remix)"	Rich Murray
1995	"Freedom (Theme from Panther)" (with Various Artists)	Antoine Fuqua
1995	"Feels So Good"	Matthew Rolston
1995	"Who Can I Run To"	Allen "Grip" Smith
1996	"Do You Want To"	Lionel Martin
1996	"Can't Hang" (with MC Lyte)	Lionel Martin
1996	"Keep On, Keepin' On" (with MC Lyte)	Paul Boyd
1996	"Always Be My Baby (Mr. Dupri Mix)" (with Mariah Carey & Da Brat)	Mariah Carey
1998	"Am I Dreaming" (with Ol' Skool & Keith Sweat)	Keith Sweat
1998	"The Arms of the One Who Loves You"	David Nelson
1998	"My Little Secret"	Darren Grant
