= Tamika Scott =

American singer-songwriter

- Born: Barethea Tamika Scott; November 19, 1975 (age 50); College Park, Georgia, U.S.
- Occupations: Singer-songwriter; actress
- Years active: 1990–present
- Spouses: Darius Byas (m. 1994; div. 2000); Darnell Winston (m. 2004)
- Children: 3
- Relatives: LaTocha Scott (sister)
- Musical career
- Genres: R&B; soul; hip hop; new jack swing
- Instrument: Vocals
- Labels: So So Def Recordings; Columbia; Creative Artists Agency; Brolic Entertainment; Twenty Two Recordings
- Website: Official Website

Barethea Tamika Scott (born November 19, 1975) is an American singer-songwriter, actress, and ordained minister. She rose to fame in the early 1990s as a member of Xscape. Scott sang lead on the group's singles "Love on My Mind", "Who Can I Run To", and "The Arms of the One Who Loves You", the latter two which peaked in the Billboard Hot 100 and became earn platinum and gold certification by the Recording Industry Association of America. During the group's hiatus, Scott ventured into acting. She appeared in Tyler Perry's stage production Meet the Browns in 2004.

Scott reunited with Xscape in 2017 for their The Great Xscape Tour. After the group downsized to a trio in 2018, performing as Xscap3. As a member of Xscap3, the group released an extended play titled Here for It (2018). In 2019, Scott released her debut extended play, Family Affair. She also debuted her line of seasonings called Southern Fuse, along with her cookbook Table Set: A Taste of South in Your Mouth.

Throughout her career, Scott has sold more than 12 million records with Xscape. Her work with the group has earned her several and nominations, including a Soul Train Music Award, a Black Music Honors Lifetime Achievement Award, an honorary Soul Train Lady of Soul Award.

== Early life ==
Tamika Scott was born on November 19, 1975, in College Park, Georgia, to Gloria McFarlin, a teacher, and Randolph Scott, a pastor and former singer in the R&B group The Scott Three. Tamika's older sister, LaTocha Scott, is also a singer and a member of Xscape. At an early age, Scott was encouraged to sing in church and local talent shows. She attended Tri-Cities High School, graduating in 1993.

== Career ==
=== 1990–1999: Xscape ===
In 1990, Xscape was formed by Kandi Burruss, Tamera Coggins, Tameka Cottle, sisters LaTocha Scott and Tamika Scott. The group met while attending Tri-Cities High School in East Point, Georgia. In 1991, they were invited to sing at Jermaine Dupri's birthday party. Dupri eventually signed the group to his record label So So Def. In August 1993, the group released their debut single "Just Kickin' It". They released their debut album Hummin' Comin' at 'Cha in October 1993, which established the group as a viable act in the music industry. The group released their platinum-selling second album Off the Hook in 1995. The album featured songs such as "Feels So Good" and Who Can I Run To, the latter of which features Scott on shared lead vocals and became a platinum-selling single. Off the Hook won a Soul Train Music Award for R&B/Soul Album of the Year – Group, Band or Duo in 1996.

In April 1998, the group released the single "The Arms of the One Who Loves You", which features Scott on co-lead vocals. The song became a top-ten Billboard Hot 100 song and sold over 800,000 copies in the United States, earning a gold certification by the Recording Industry Association of America (RIAA). When the third album Traces of My Lipstick was released in May 1998, Scott's elder sister LaTocha announced her plans to go solo. The album peaked at number twenty-eight on the U.S. Billboard 200 and eventually earned a platinum certification by the Recording Industry Association of America in 1999. The album also spawned another Billboard Hot 100 song "My Little Secret", which became certified gold in the US. In 2000, the group went on a hiatus to pursue solo careers.

=== 2000–2016: Solo career ===
In 1998, Scott began recording a gospel album. The album included collaborations with BeBe & CeCe Winans. When Xscape briefly reformed in 2000, Scott abandoned the project and the album remained shelved. In 2004, Scott pursued an acting career. In August 2004, she appeared as the character Milay Brown in Meet the Browns, an American stage play written and directed by Tyler Perry.

In 2005, Scott reformed Xscape with original members Tameka Cottle and LaTocha Scott, along with new member Kiesha Miles. The group recorded a full album titled Unchained but the album was shelved after the release of a single "What's Up", which failed to chart and received minor radio airplay. The group also did a few concert performances before disbanding by 2006. In 2007, Scott released a song titled Greatest Gift on the soundtrack of American romantic comedy-drama film Daddy's Little Girls. She also co-wrote and produced "Step Aside" by Yolanda Adams as well as "Struggle No More (The Main Event)" by Anthony Hamilton, which appeared on the same soundtrack. She released the titled-track for the soundtrack of comedy-drama film Why Did I Get Married?, released in October 2007.

In 2009, Scott appeared a single titled "Pull On My Weave" by singer Phoenix the Fire Starter. In 2010, Scott released a single titled "Say Aah". In February 2013, LaTocha Scott and Tamika Scott performed as Xscape at the So So Def 20th Anniversary Concert. In 2015, the original members of Xscape appeared in an episode of music documentary Unsung. The episode chronicled the group's success as well as internal turmoil.

=== 2017–present: Reunion with Xscape and other projects ===
On June 25, 2017, Xscape reunited and performed at BET Awards 2017, marking their first performance together in eighteen years. In November 2017, the group embarked on their headlining tour The Great Xscape Tour. In late 2017, Xscape premiered their own reality show, titled Xscape: Still Kickin' It, on Bravo network. The reality show was centered on the group resolving internal conflicts, preparation and rehearsals for their upcoming tour, and personal endeavors. The group downsized to a trio after fellow member Burruss departed and the remaining members began performing as Xscap3. In March 2018, Xscap3 released an extended play titled Here for It, which spawned two singles: "Wifed Up" and "Dream Killa".

In December 2019, Scott released an extend play titled Family Affair, which featured the singles "Almost Over" and "Go Outside in the Rain". In 2021, Scott launched her brand of food seasonings titled Southern Fuse. On May 17, 2022, Scott officially released her cookbook "Table Set, Cooking with Tamika Scott". On April 21, 2023, Scott released a single titled "Tonight".

== Personal life ==
In 1994, Scott gave birth to her first child O'Shun Reney, to Darius Byas. Scott revealed on Watch What Happens Live with Andy Cohen that when she got pregnant while in Xscape, her producers threatened to kick her out of the group if she didn't have an abortion. She refused and had her daughter Oshun. Later in 1994, Scott married Byas. In 1999, she gave birth to their second child Taniyah. In the early 2000, Scott divorced Byas. In 2004, she married bodyguard Darnell Winston. In July 2013, Scott gave birth to their daughter.

== Discography ==
Extended plays

Title	Details
Family Affair	Release date: December 13, 2019; Label: Twenty Two Recordings; Formats: Digital download, streaming

Singles

- "Pull on my Weave" (Phoenix the Fire Starter featuring Tamika Scott) (2009)
- "Say Aah" (featuring Rasheeda, Trina and Gloss Da Boss) (2010)
- "Almost Over" (2019)
- "All of Me" (featuring Q Parker) (2019)
- "Go Outside in the Rain" (2019)
- "Tonight" (featuring Method Man)

Soundtrack appearances

Year	Song	Album
2007	"Greatest Gift"	Daddy's Little Girls
2007	"Why Did I Get Married?"	Why Did I Get Married?

== Filmography ==
Film appearances
Year	Title	Role
2020	Conundrum: Secrets Among Friends	Amenirdis
2023	Wide Open: The Andre Rison Story	Nike Executive
2023	Christmas Ringer	Cherise
2024	Smoke	-

Television appearances
Year	Title	Role	Notes
1994	The All-New Mickey Mouse Club	Herself as a Guest Mousketeer	The Guest Day Episode of Season 7
2017	Xscape: Still Kickin' It	Herself	Main cast
2023	SWV & Xscape: The Queens of R&B	Herself	Main Cast

== Theatre and musical ==
- Meet the Browns (2004)
- There's a Stranger in My House (2009)
- The Little Black Dress (2015)
- A Good Man Is Hard To Find (2015)
- The Man of Her Dreams (2016)
