= Understanding (disambiguation) =

Understanding is a psychological process through which one is able to think about and deal with an abstraction or object.

Understanding may also refer to:

- Natural language understanding
- Query understanding
- Understanding (Kant), a concept in Kantian philosophy
- Understanding (TV series), a documentary television series
- Understanding (Bobby Womack album)
- Understanding (John Patton album)
- Understanding (Wallace Roney album)
- Understanding (Xscape album)
  - "Understanding" (song), title song from this album
- Understanding, album by Mirah
- "Understanding", a song by Bob Seger
- "Understanding", a song by Candlebox from the album Lucy
- "Understanding", a song by Collective Soul from the album Collective Soul
- "Understanding", a song by Evanescence
- "Understanding", a song by Ray Charles from A Portrait of Ray

== See also ==
- Understand (disambiguation)
- I Understand (disambiguation)
- The Understanding (disambiguation)
- Verstehen ("understanding"), in the context of social sciences, is used with the particular sense of the "interpretive or participatory" examination of social phenomena
