= Chris Landry (rapper) =

American singer-songwriter

- Born: Christian Landry; May 13, 1998 (age 28); Houston, Texas, U.S
- Genres: Hip hop; Rap
- Occupations: Rapper, Singer-songwriter
- Instrument: Vocals
- Years active: 2009–present
- Labels: Current: Twenty Two Music Group; Former Blu Kolla Dreams: Black Kings Entertainment

Christian Landry (born May 13, 1998 in Houston, Texas, U.S), popularly known by the stage name Chris Landry is an American rapper and songwriter currently based in Atlanta, U.S. In 2014, his debut mixtape titled Sky Scrapers was released to positive reviews thus gaining him new grounds. He is currently signed to Twenty Two Music Group.

== Early life and education ==
Chris Landry was born in Texas where he attended Lee High School, Baytown, Texas as a freshman before he subsequently transferred to Sterling High School in his sophomore year.

== Career ==
Chris Landry grew up listening to Bow Wow until he started writing songs while in school. In November 2011, Bobby V discovered Chris Landry on social media website Twitter and offered him a recording contract with Blu Kolla Dreams Records under which Chris went on to release his popular single titled "House Party". He cites Jay Z, Kanye West and Drake as his musical influences.

On November 16, 2012, Chris Landry released his first major project titled Just a Kid With a Dream. On January 31, 2014, he released a mixtape titled Sky Scrappers which featured acts like Bobby V, Fat Pimp, Travie Trav and Dontrell. On 13 June 2016, he went on to release a 12-track EP titled Something To Prove through his imprint Black Kings Entertainment. It was hosted by DJ Iceberg and DJ Frank White.

== Discography ==
=== Selected singles ===
Title	Year	Album
"My Girl"	2011	Non-album single
"She Diggin' Me"	2012	Just a Kid With a Dream
"Main Girl" (featuring Young Scrap)	2012	Non-album singles
"House Party"	2013	Non-album singles
"A Piece" (featuring Bobby V)	2013	Non-album singles
"Fine As You"	2013	Non-album singles
"Turn Me Up" (featuring Young Scrap)	2014	Non-album singles
"Vitamin ME"	2014	Non-album singles
"Nothing" (featuring Trevis Romell)	2015	Non-album singles
"All I Know" (featuring Rizzoo Rizzoo)	2015	Non-album singles
"7 Days a Week"	2015	Something To Prove
"100" (featuring Tory Lanez)	2016	Non-album single
"Go To"	2016	Non-album single

=== Mixtapes ===
Year	Album title	Album details
2014	Sky Scrappers	Released: January 31, 2014; Label: Blu Kolla; Formats: Digital download

=== EPs ===
Year	Album title	Album details
2012	Just a Kid With a Dream	Released: November 16, 2012; Formats: Digital download
2016	Something To Prove	Released: June 13, 2016; Formats: Digital download
2018	"Pain"	Released: June 13, 2016; Label: Entertainment One; Formats: Digital download
