= College Park High School =

College Park High School may refer to:

- College Park High School (Georgia)
- College Park High School (Pleasant Hill, California)
- The Woodlands College Park High School
