= Meet the Browns =

Meet the Browns may refer to:

- Meet the Browns (play), a play by Tyler Perry in 2004
- Meet the Browns (film), a 2008 romantic comedy-drama film based on the play
- Meet the Browns (TV series), a television series based on the play and the film
