= Traces of My Lipstick =

Studio album by Xscape
- Released: May 12, 1998
- Genre: R&B
- Length: 52:42
- Labels: So So Def; Columbia; Sony
- Producers: Warryn Campbell; Jermaine Dupri; Joe; Leferron Miles; Guy Roche; Tamika Scott; Daryl Simmons; SOZO! Entertainment; Keith Sweat

Xscape chronology
Off the Hook (1995)	Traces of My Lipstick (1998)	Here for It (2018)

Singles from Traces of My Lipstick
- 1. "The Arms of the One Who Loves You" Released: February 14, 1998; 2. "My Little Secret" Released: July 7, 1998; 3. "Softest Place on Earth" Released: September 29, 1998

Traces of My Lipstick is the third studio album by American R&B group Xscape. The album was released on May 12, 1998, through So So Def Recordings, Columbia Records, and Sony Music Entertainment. The album was preceded by the release of three singles: "The Arms of the One Who Loves You", "My Little Secret" and "Softest Place on Earth".

The album debuted at number 28 on the US Billboard 200 and number six Top R&B/Hip-Hop Albums chart. The album was certified Platinum by the Recording Industry Association of America (RIAA) on June 21, 1999. To date the album has sold 1.7 million copies in the United States and over 2.4 million copies worldwide.

== Background and release ==
"Traces of My Lipstick" was the group's first album in three years after the release of their second album Off the Hook (1995). As with previous albums Hummin' Comin' at 'Cha (1993) and Off the Hook (1995), the album was chiefly produced by Jermaine Dupri with Manuel Seal, Jr. and Daryl Simmons, with addition production from Babyface, Joe Thomas, Warryn Campbell and Keith Sweat.

"All About Me" originally featured rap verses by Dupri and Foxy Brown that were eventually removed to avoid a parental advisory designation. Brown's voice can still be heard at the end of "All About Me (Intro)" and the beginning of "All About Me (Reprise)".

== Promotion ==
=== Singles ===
"The Arms of the One Who Loves You" was released as the lead single on February 14, 1998. The song peaked at number seven on the US Billboard Hot 100 chart and number four on the Hot R&B/Hip Hop Songs Chart. It sold 800,000 copies, earning a gold certification from the RIAA. "My Little Secret" was released as the album's second single on July 7, 1998. The song charted at number nine on the Billboard Hot 100 and number two on the Hot R&B/Hip Hop Songs Chart. "Softest Place on Earth" was released as the album's third and final single on September 29, 1998. The song failed to chart in the Billboard Hot 100 but did chart at number twenty-eight on the Hot R&B/Hip Hop Songs Chart.

=== Other songs ===
"Am I Dreaming" is a song by Ol' Skool featuring Keith Sweat and Xscape and was released on January 27, 1998. The song peaked at number five on the Hot R&B/Hip Hop Songs Chart.

== Critical reception ==
Professional ratings
Review scores
Source	Rating
Allmusic	3/5 stars
Entertainment Weekly	B
XXL	M

Traces of My Lipstick was met with mixed to positive reviews from critics. Billboard editor Paul Verna noted that Traces of My Lipstick was "full of tracks that listeners of all ages will be able to identify with. The quartet shows a phenomenal level of versatility on this project, which showcases not only the group's two strongest vocalists — sisters LaTocha and Tamika Scott – but also Kandi Burruss and Tameka "Tiny" Cottle." Entertainment Weekly's Cheo Tyehimba found that with the album "Xscape have learned what every old bluesman already knows: Infidelity makes good grist for a torchy slice of soul music. Still, this is the '90s, so the girls croon lines like "Everyone Cheats" with pure nonchalance and save their tender, surrendering coos for ballads like "Am I Dreamin'"." He gave the album a B rating. The Source remarked: "Like any good album, each song here is distinct from the next [...] Rich, throaty and clear, they're strong enough to carry a song with the most minimal of beats."

Leo Stanley from Allmusic gave Traces of My Lipstick three stars out of five, stating: "On their third album, Traces of My Lipstick, Xscape pretty much follows the cue of their two earlier efforts, with only slightly diminished results. The group sounds as good as ever, bringing real soul and passion to their performances, but unfortunately much of their record consists of average, unremarkable material. There are enough strong songs (primarily the singles) to make the record enjoyable, but it simply doesn't have the same resonance as their two earlier efforts." Hakeem Stevens, writing for XXL magazine, called the project a "disappointing album." He felt that "unfortunately, while the album boasts an illustrious fine up of super-producers and songwriters [...] Traces fails to come through with the goods," displaying "many generically-written (and produced) R&B-pop-radio-friendly joints." He concluded: "Xscape has talent — but here they've been boxed in by the constraints of formulaic songwriting and run-of-the-mill production."

== Commercial performance ==
Traces of My Lipstick debuted at number twenty-eight on the US Billboard 200 and number six on the Top R&B/Hip-Hop Albums chart, lower than their two previous albums. The album reached Gold status on June 30, 1998 and was eventually certified Platinum by the Recording Industry Association of America (RIAA) on June 21, 1999, for shipments figures in excess of one million copies.

== Track listing ==
Traces of My Lipstick track listing
No.	Title	Writer(s)	Producer(s)	Length
1.	"All About Me" (Intro)	Jermaine Dupri; Manuel Seal	Dupri; Seal^{[a]}	1:59
2.	"My Little Secret"	Dupri; LaTocha Scott; Seal	Dupri; Seal^{[a]}	4:28
3.	"Softest Place on Earth"	Joseph "Joe" Thomas; Joshua Thompson	Joe Thomas	4:16
4.	"Do You Know"	Dupri; Seal	Dupri; Seal^{[a]}	3:36
5.	"One of Those Love Songs"	Warryn Campbell; Seth Swirsky	Campbell	4:15
6.	"The Arms of the One Who Loves You"	Diane Warren	Guy Roche	4:20
7.	"I Will"	Dupri; Seal	Dupri; Seal^{[a]}	4:10
8.	"Your Eyes"	Kenneth Edmonds; Daryl Simmons	Simmons	5:09
9.	"All I Need"	Leferron Miles; Tamika Scott	Miles; Scott	4:21
10.	"Am I Dreamin'" (featuring Ol' Skool & Keith Sweat)	Sam Dees	Keith Sweat	5:42
11.	"The Runaround"	Simmons; William Thomas	Simmons	5:14
12.	"Hold On"	Nate Butler; Preston Crump; Sean Hall	SOZO! Entertainment	4:07
13.	"All About Me" (Reprise)	Dupri; Seal	Dupri; Seal^{[a]}	1:04
Total length:				52:42

Notes

- ^{^a} denotes co-producer
- "I Will" contains an interpolation of "Upside Down" written by Nile Rogers and Bernard Edwards, performed by Diana Ross.

== Credits and personnel ==
Performers and musicians

- Babyface – drums, keyboard
- Foxy Brown – additional vocals
- Bobby Crawford – drums
- Sean "Sep" Hall – drums, keyboard
- Jagged Edge – additional vocals
- Tomi Martin – guitar
- Daryl Simmons – additional vocals
- Ol' Skool – additional vocals
- Guy Roche – keyboard
- William "P Sound" Thomas – drums
- Michael Thompson – guitar
- George Wadenius – guitar

Technical

- Babyface – drum programming, producer
- Warryn Campbell – producer
- Bobby Crawford – drum programming
- Jermaine Dupri – mixing, executive producer, producer
- Brian Frye – engineer
- John Frye – mixing assistance
- Sean "Sep" Hall – drum programming
- * Karl Heilbron – engineer
- Joe – producer, programming
- Tom "TK" Kidd – mixing
- Kevin Lively – mixing assistance
- Alex Lowe – mixing assistance
- Michael Mauldin – executive producer
- Neil Pogue – mixing
- Chris Puram – engineer, mixing
- Everett Ramos – engineer
- Thomas Rickert – mixing assistance
- Guy Roche – producer, programming
- Manuel Seal, Jr – producer
- Mike Seieizi – engineer
- Ron A. Shaffer – mixing
- Daryl Simmon – producer
- Brian Smith – engineer
- Keith Sweat – producer
- Phil Tan – mixing
- Rich Tapper – engineer
- William "P Sound" Thomas – drum programming
- Dave Way – mixing

== Charts ==
=== Weekly charts ===
Weekly chart performance for Traces of My Lipstick
Chart (1998)	Peak position
UK Albums (Official Charts)	181
UK R&B Albums (Official Charts)	22
US Billboard 200	28
US Top R&B/Hip-Hop Albums (Billboard)	6

=== Year-end charts ===
Year-end chart performance for Traces of My Lipstick
Chart (1998)	Position
US Billboard 200	133
US Top R&B/Hip-Hop Albums (Billboard)	48

== Certifications ==
Certifications for Traces of My Lipstick
Region	Certification	Certified units/sales
United States (RIAA)	Platinum	1,000,000^{^}
^{^} Shipments figures based on certification alone.
