= Russellville High School =

Russellville High School may refer to:

- Russellville High School (Alabama), Russellville, Alabama
- Russellville High School (Arkansas), Russellville, Arkansas
- Russellville High School (Kentucky), Russellville, Kentucky
- Russellville High School (Missouri), Russellville, Missouri
- Russell High School (East Point, Georgia), formerly named Russellville High School
