= Love on My Mind =

Love on My Mind may refer to:

- "Love on My Mind" (Xscape song), 1994
- "Love on My Mind" (Freemasons song), 2005

== See also ==
- "I've Got Love on My Mind", 1977 song by Natalie Cole
