= Understand (disambiguation) =

To understand is to achieve understanding.

Understand may also refer to:

== Music ==
- Understand?, an album by Naked Raygun, 1989
- "Understand" (Melanie C song), 2008
- "My Generation"/"Understand", a single by Yui, 2007
- "Understand", a song by Asian Kung-Fu Generation from Kimi Tsunagi Five M, 2003
- "Understand", a song by BoyWithUke from Serotonin Dreams, 2022
- "Understand", a song by Christina Aguilera from Back to Basics, 2006
- "Understand", a song by Jacques Greene from Dawn Chorus, 2019
- "Understand", a song by Jeremy Camp from Stay, 2002
- "Understand", a song by Keshi (singer), 2023
- "Understand", a song by Shawn Mendes from Illuminate, 2016
- "Understand", a song by Yourcodenameis:milo from They Came from the Sun, 2007

== Other uses ==
- Understand (software), a software development platform
- "Understand" (story), a 1991 novelette by Ted Chiang

== See also ==
- Don't Understand (disambiguation)
- I Understand (disambiguation)
- Understanding (disambiguation)
