= Twenty Two Recordings =

American independent record label

- Parent company: Warner Music Group
- Founded: 2000s
- Founder: Arthur Burton
- Distributor: ADA
- Genre: Various
- Country of origin: United States
- Location: Hope, Arkansas
- Official website: t2rmusicgroup.com

Twenty Two Recordings is an American independent record label founded by Arthur Burton III. The label is distributed through Twenty Two Music Group Distribution and Warner Music Group via Alternative Distribution Alliance

== Artists ==
=== Current artists ===
- Jason Little
- Tamika Scott
- Dae Dae
- Eddie Levert
- Raz B
- Cassidy
- Ali Campbell
- Rome
- Donnie Klang
- Sammie

=== Former artists ===
- Lil Flip
- Outlawz
- Dead Prez
- Infamous Mobb
- Prodigy
- Mercan Dede
- Toots and The Maytals
- Mary Ramsey
- 10,000 Maniacs
- Fishbone
- Jesus Jones
- Deep Forest
- Modern English
- Midge Ure
- Dave Eggar & The Flux Quartet
- MF Doom Maxim
- Thomas Mapfumo
- Diblo Dibala
- Mercan Dede

== Subsidiary labels ==
- Mi5 Recordings
- Suthun Music Entertainment
- RMG Music Group
- Str8 Wired Entertainment
- Muddy Dreams Ent
- Rich Heart Entertainment
- Dreambridge Entertainment
