= Understanding (Xscape album) =

Compilation album by Xscape
- Released: December 22, 2002
- Recorded: 1993–1998
- Genre: R&B
- Length: 43:47
- Label: Sony Special Product

Xscape chronology
| Traces of My Lipstick (1998) | Understanding (2002) | Super Hits (2009) |

Professional ratings
Review scores
| Source | Rating |
|---|---|
| Allmusic | link |

Understanding is a compilation album by female R&B act Xscape, released on December 22, 2002.

== Track listing ==
1. Let Me Know – 3:41
2. Love on My Mind – 3:51
3. Understanding – 5:42
4. What Can I Do – 3:06
5. Do Like Lovers Do – 4:36
6. Work Me Slow – 4:13
7. Do You Want To – 5:43
8. I Will – 4:11
9. My Little Secret – 4:29
10. One of Those Love Songs – 4:15
