= Kelley Mote =

American football player (1923–2015)

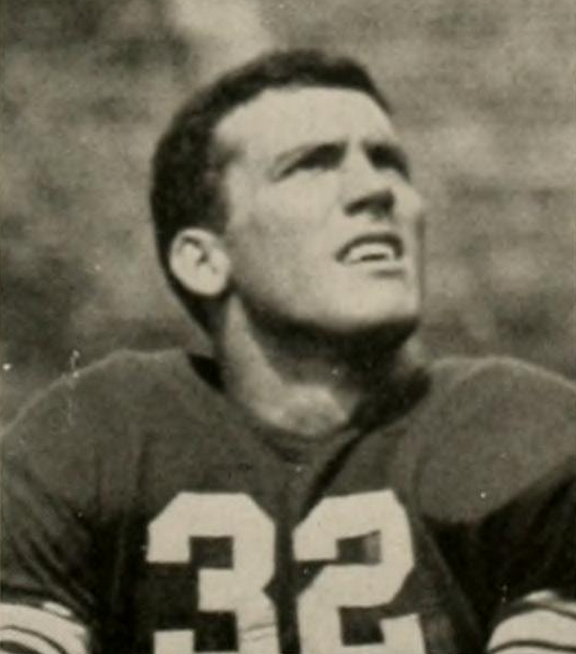
- Mote pictured in c. 1947 at Duke University

No. 78, 83, 80
- Positions: Wide receiver, defensive back

Personal information
- Born: April 27, 1923; Hapeville, Georgia, U.S.
- Died: October 21, 2015 (aged 92); North Carolina, U.S.
- Listed height: 6 ft 2 in (1.88 m)
- Listed weight: 189 lb (86 kg)

Career information
- High school: Hapeville
- College: South Carolina (1942); Duke (1943, 1945-1946)
- NFL draft: 1946: 16th round, 147th overall pick

Career history

Playing
- Detroit Lions (1947–1949); New York Giants (1950–1952)

Coaching
- Hamilton Tiger-Cats (1963–1966) Assistant coach; Ottawa Rough Riders (1967–1968) Assistant coach

Awards and highlights
- 2× First-team All-SoCon (1945, 1946)

Career NFL statistics
- Receptions: 52
- Receiving yards: 754
- Touchdowns: 6
- Stats at Pro Football Reference

Kelley Mote (April 27, 1923 – October 21, 2015) was an American professional football player who was a wide receiver for six seasons for the Detroit Lions and New York Giants. He died on October 21, 2015, in North Carolina at the age of 92.

In his first two seasons with the Detroit Lions, Mote caught a total of 29 catches for 392 yards and one touchdown. After an unimpressive season in 1949 with four catches and 58 yards, Mote signed with the New York Giants, where he spent the last three years of his career. Across his six seasons in the NFL, Mote caught 52 passes for 754 yards and six touchdowns.
