= I Understand =

I Understand may refer to:

- "I Understand" (1941 song), a popular song written by Mabel Wayne and Kim Gannon
- "I Understand (Just How You Feel)", a 1953 popular song written by Pat Best
- "I Understand", a gospel song performed by Bebe Winans, Kim Burrell, Rance Allen, Mariah Carey and Hezekiah Walker & The Love Fellowship Tabernacle Church Choir, from the 2008 album Randy Jackson's Music Club, Vol. 1

== See also ==
- "I Understand It", a song by Idlewild
- "I Can't Understand", a song by Queen Latifah
- Understand (disambiguation)
- Understanding (disambiguation)
