= Edawn Coughman =

American gridiron football player (born 1988)

No. 76, 77
- Position: Offensive tackle

Personal information
- Born: July 21, 1988 (age 38); Riverdale, Georgia, U.S.
- Listed height: 6 ft 4 in (1.93 m)
- Listed weight: 309 lb (140 kg)

Career information
- High school: Tri-Cities (East Point, Georgia)
- College: Shaw (2008–2010)
- NFL draft: 2011: undrafted

Career history
- Toronto Argonauts (2011); Seattle Seahawks (2012)*; Dallas Cowboys (2013)*; Buffalo Bills (2013)*; Tampa Bay Buccaneers (2014)*; Washington Redskins (2014)*; Tampa Bay Buccaneers (2015)*; Houston Texans (2015)*; Arizona Cardinals (2016)*
- * Offseason or practice squad member only

Awards and highlights
- 2× First-team All-CIAA (2009, 2010)
- Stats at Pro Football Reference
- Stats at CFL.ca (archive)

Edawn Coughman (born July 21, 1988) is an American former football offensive tackle. He played college football at Dodge City Community College before transferring to Shaw University. He has played for the Toronto Argonauts of the Canadian Football League (CFL), and the Seattle Seahawks, Dallas Cowboys, Buffalo Bills, Tampa Bay Buccaneers, Washington Redskins and Houston Texans of the National Football League (NFL).

== Early life and college ==
After Tri-Cities High School in East Point, Georgia, Coughman attended Dodge City Community College. He transferred to Shaw University, where he played for the Shaw Bears from 2008 to 2010. He earned first-team All-CIAA honors in 2009 and 2010. Coughman was named a Division II All-American by the Heritage Sports Radio Network (HSRN) in 2009. He was named an honorable mention Black College Football All-American by Boxtorow.com/BASN in 2009. He garnered third-team Don Hansen NCAA Division II All-Super Region I recognition in 2010. Coughman earned CIAA Offensive Lineman of the Week accolades three times in 2010. He was also named to the 2010 HBUC Bowl. The Bears won the CIAA Championship in 2010. He majored in Recreation Studies at Shaw.

== Professional athletic career ==
Pre-draft measurables
| Height | Weight | 40-yard dash | 10-yard split | 20-yard split | 20-yard shuttle | Three-cone drill | Vertical jump | Broad jump | Bench press |
|---|---|---|---|---|---|---|---|---|---|
| 6 ft 4 in (1.93 m) | 305 lb (138 kg) | 5.07 s | 1.73 s | 2.91 s | 4.76 s | 7.86 s | 25 1/2 in (0.65 m) | 8 ft 5 in (2.57 m) | 31 reps |
All values from NC State Pro Day

=== Canadian Football League ===
Coughman played in nine games for the Toronto Argonauts during the 2011 season. He was released in May 2012.

=== National Football League ===
After being released by the Argonauts, Coughman was signed by the Seattle Seahawks on June 18, 2012. He was released in August 2012.

Coughman was signed by the Dallas Cowboys on May 13, 2013. He was released on August 30, 2013. Three days later, Coughman was signed to the Buffalo Bills' practice squad. He was signed to a reserve/future contract by the Bills on December 30, 2013. The Bills released Coughman on August 19, 2014. One day after being released by the Bills, Coughman was signed by the Tampa Bay Buccaneers. He was released by the Buccaneers on August 29, 2014.

On December 11, 2014, Coughman was signed to the Washington Redskins practice squad. He then signed a futures contract on December 29. He was waived by the Redskins on May 4, 2015. On May 11, 2015, Coughman was re-signed by the Tampa Bay Buccaneers. He was released by the Buccaneers on September 5 and signed to the team's practice squad the next day. He was released by the Buccaneers on September 8, 2015.

Coughman was signed to the Houston Texans' practice squad on September 23, 2015. He was released by the Texans on October 13, 2015. He was signed by the Arizona Cardinals on January 5, 2016. He was released by the team on June 1, 2016.

== Legal issues ==
On September 12, 2019, Coughman was arrested in Lawrenceville, Georgia and accused of attempting to stage a fake hate crime. Police responded to a call reporting a man damaging a restaurant Create & Bake Pizza and ice cream shop Coughman’s Creamery before fleeing in a black truck with no license plates. Officers found signs of forced entry at the restaurant, damage to the video surveillance equipment, walls and booths including broken mirrors, and graffiti that included racial slurs, swastikas, and the phrase MAGA. When police confronted Coughman in a truck matching the vehicle description, they noticed it contained multiple televisions that appeared to have been ripped off a wall (wall brackets and pieces of drywall were still attached to the televisions). Coughman claimed that he had noticed the damage earlier that day and had reported it to his insurance company but not law enforcement. The charges pending against Coughman include falsely reporting a burglary, insurance fraud, and concealing a license plate.

Coughman has also been arrested for aggravated assault and robbery in 2020 in Douglas County, Georgia, and battery-family violence in 2022 in Gwinnett County, Georgia.
