= Tristan Davis =

American gridiron football player (born 1986)

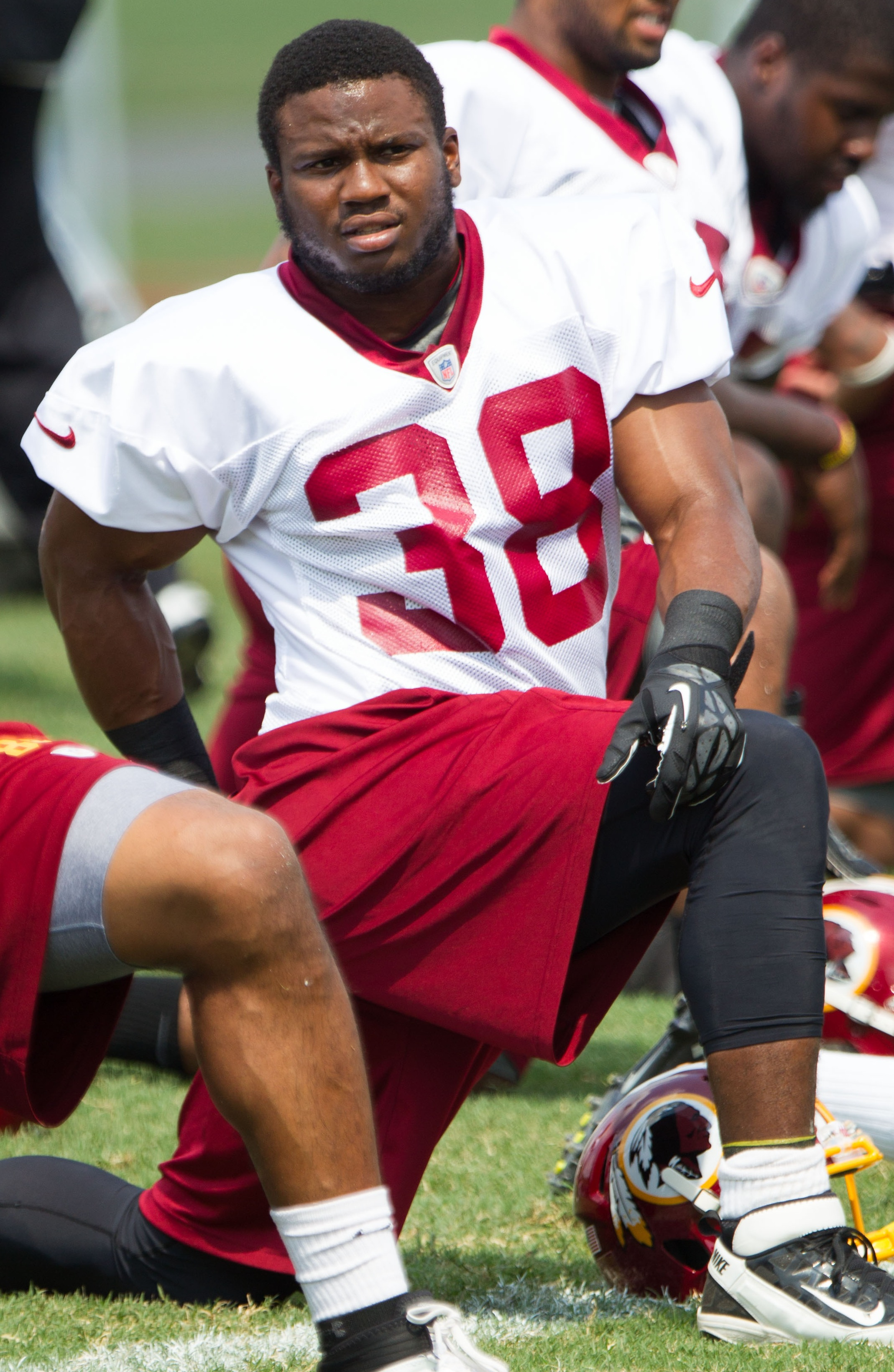
- Davis at Redskins training camp in 2012

No. 38
- Position: Running back

Personal information
- Born: May 6, 1986 (age 40); Atlanta, Georgia, U.S.
- Listed height: 5 ft 10 in (1.78 m)
- Listed weight: 212 lb (96 kg)

Career information
- High school: Tri-Cities (East Point, Georgia)
- College: Auburn
- NFL draft: 2009: undrafted

Career history
- Detroit Lions (2009)*; Miami Dolphins (2009−2010)*; Minnesota Vikings (2011)*; New Orleans Saints (2011)*; Pittsburgh Steelers (2011)*; Washington Redskins (2011−2012); Toronto Argonauts (2014)*
- * Offseason or practice squad member only
- Stats at Pro Football Reference

Tristan Dion Davis (born May 5, 1986) is an American former football running back. He played college football at Auburn University, before being signed by the Detroit Lions as an undrafted free agent in 2009.

Davis was also a member of the Miami Dolphins, New Orleans Saints, Pittsburgh Steelers, and Minnesota Vikings and Washington Redskins. He retired from football on July 30, 2013, without playing a single regular season game in his entire career.

== Early life ==
Davis was born in Atlanta, Georgia, and attended Tri-Cities High School, in East Point, Georgia, where he was a standout athlete for the Tri-Cities Bulldogs baseball, football and track teams, earning All-America honors in baseball and track.

== College career ==
Davis led the SEC in Kickoff Return Yards Per Return in 2006 (27.0 yards per return average) and 2008 (27.4), and also led the SEC & NCAA (along with four others) with two Kickoff Return Touchdowns in 2008.

== Professional career ==
=== Detroit Lions ===
Davis signed with the Detroit Lions on August 24, 2009, as an undrafted free agent. On September 5, he was released, and signed to the team's practice squad the next day. He was released on October 30, 2009.

=== Miami Dolphins ===
Davis signed with the Miami Dolphins practice squad on November 9, 2009. On January 6, 2010, he was signed off the practice squad. He was waived on August 23, 2010.

=== Minnesota Vikings ===
On July 31, 2011, Davis signed with the Minnesota Vikings. In a preseason game against the Seattle Seahawks, Davis had one carry, a 35-yard touchdown scoring run. He was released after final roster cuts on September 2, 2011.

=== New Orleans Saints ===
Davis was signed to the practice squad of the New Orleans Saints on September 21, 2011, but was released the next day.

=== Pittsburgh Steelers ===
On October 5, 2011, Davis signed with the practice squad of the Pittsburgh Steelers. He was released on October 18.

=== Washington Redskins ===
On October 25, 2011, Davis signed with the practice squad of the Washington Redskins. He was released on November 8, but re-signed with the squad on November 22.

On January 3, 2012, Davis signed a futures contract with the Redskins. Due to a knee injury, he was placed on the physically unable to perform list before the start of training camp on July 18, 2012. He was taken off the PUP list on August 2. After suffering a right knee injury in the last preseason game against the Tampa Bay Buccaneers, he was waived-injured on August 31, 2012. After clearing waivers, he was officially added to the injured reserve list on September 3.

On July 30, 2013, Davis left the Redskins after informing Head Coach Mike Shanahan "that his heart was no longer in playing football anymore" and unofficially retired.

=== Toronto Argonauts ===
On January 8, 2014, Davis signed with the Toronto Argonauts of the Canadian Football League. He was released on April 24, 2014. to make room for Steve Slaton.

== Coaching career ==
Davis is currently involved in coaching in the greater Atlanta area through the private coaching service, CoachUp.
