= Tom Redmond =

American football player (born 1937)

No. 66, 65
- Positions: Defensive end, Guard, tackle

Personal information
- Born: September 21, 1937 (age 89); Atlanta, Georgia, U.S.
- Listed height: 6 ft 5 in (1.96 m)
- Listed weight: 250 lb (113 kg)

Career information
- High school: Russell (East Point, Georgia)
- College: Vanderbilt
- NFL draft: 1959: 6th round, 63rd overall pick

Career history
- St. Louis Cardinals (1960–1965)

Career NFL statistics
- Games played: 60
- Games started: 14
- Fumble recoveries: 3
- Sacks: 6.5
- Stats at Pro Football Reference

Tom Redmond (born September 21, 1937) is an American former professional football player who was a defensive lineman for six seasons with the St. Louis Cardinals of the National Football League (NFL) from 1960 to 1965. He played college football for the Vanderbilt Commodores.
