= Cameron Ball =

American football player (born 2003)

No. 92 – Indianapolis Colts
- Position: Defensive tackle
- Roster status: Practice squad

Personal information
- Born: February 19, 2003 (age 23)
- Listed height: 6 ft 4 in (1.93 m)
- Listed weight: 310 lb (141 kg)

Career information
- High school: Tri-Cities (East Point, Georgia)
- College: Arkansas (2021–2025)
- NFL draft: 2026: undrafted

Career history
- Indianapolis Colts (2026–present)*
- * Offseason or practice squad member only
- Stats at Pro Football Reference

Cameron Ball (born February 19, 2003) is an American professional football defensive tackle for the Indianapolis Colts of the National Football League (NFL). He played college football for the Arkansas Razorbacks.

== Early life ==
Ball attended Tri-Cities High School. Coming out of high school, he was rated as a three-star recruit, where he committed to play college football for the Arkansas Razorbacks over other offer from schools such as Georgia Tech, Arizona State, Illinois, and Tennessee.

== College career ==
During his first two seasons in 2021 and 2022, he combined to play in 15 games, while utilizing a redshirt, where he recorded 32 tackles with two and a half being for a loss, a sack, and a forced fumble. Ball finished the 2023 season, making six starts, where he totaled 32 tackles. In the 2024 regular season finale, he tallied a career-high seven tackles against Missouri. During the 2024 season, Ball started all 13 games, where he notched 47 tackles with four being for a loss, and a sack and a half. Heading into the 2025 season, he was named one of the Razorbacks team captains. In week eight of the 2025 season, Ball recorded five tackles versus Texas A&M. During the 2025 season, he totaled 27 tackles with four and a half being for a loss. After the conclusion of the season, he accepted an invite to participate in the 2026 Senior Bowl.

== Professional career ==
Pre-draft measurables
Height	Weight	Arm length	Hand span	Wingspan	40-yard dash	10-yard split	20-yard split	20-yard shuttle	Three-cone drill	Vertical jump	Broad jump	Bench press
6 ft 3 5/8 in (1.92 m)	310 lb (141 kg)	33 in (0.84 m)	9 1/2 in (0.24 m)	6 ft 6 7/8 in (2.00 m)	5.13 s	1.79 s	2.97 s	4.76 s	7.71 s	32.0 in (0.81 m)	9 ft 1 in (2.77 m)	20 reps
All values from NFL Combine/Pro Day

After not being selected in the 2026 NFL draft, Ball signed with the Indianapolis Colts as an undrafted free agent. Ball was waived by Indianapolis on August 30, 2026, as a part of final roster cuts; he was re–signed to the team's practice squad the next day.
