= Hapeville High School =

High school in Georgia, United States

Coordinates: 33°39′37″N 84°24′23″W

Information
- School type: High school
- Closed: 1988

Hapeville High School was a high school in Hapeville, Georgia, United States. The school closed in 1988 when it was combined with Woodland High School, College Park High School and Russell High School to form Tri-Cities High School. Hapeville High is now Hapeville Elementary, which brought all the elementary schools in the city into one building.

== Notable alumni ==
- Jeff Foxworthy (1977), comedian known for his eponymous sitcom
- Kelly Mote, football player
