= Do You Want To/Can't Hang =

"Do You Want To" / "Can't Hang"

Single by Xscape

from the album Off the Hook
- Released: February 1996
- Genre: R&B ("Do You Want To"): R&B; hip-hop soul; ("Can't Hang")
- Length: 4:05 (single version) / 5:42 (album version) ("Do You Want To"); 3:45 ("Can't Hang" feat. MC Lyte)
- Label: So So Def
- Songwriters: Jermaine Dupri; Carl-So-Lowe; Lana Moorer; Kandi Burruss; Tameka Cottle; LaTocha Scott; Tamika Scott
- Producer: Jermaine Dupri

Xscape singles chronology
"Who Can I Run To" (1995)	"Do You Want To" / "Can't Hang" (1996)	"Keep On Keepin' On" (1996)

MC Lyte singles chronology
"Freedom" (1994)	"Can't Hang" (1996)	"Keep On, Keepin' On" (1996)

"Do You Want To" / "Can't Hang" are two songs recorded by American R&B group Xscape. It was issued in February 1996, as the fourth single from their second studio album Off the Hook (1995). The song reached number #50 on the Billboard Hot 100 and number #9 on Billboard's Hot R&B/Hip-Hop Singles & Tracks. It was a double A-side to "Do You Want To". The song "Can't Hang" contains an interpolation of “Southern Girl” by Maze featuring Frankie Beverly, from their fourth studio album, Joy and Pain (1980).

The song saw member Kandi taking lead vocals on most of "Can't Hang". Tiny Cottle and Latocha Scott share lead vocals on "Do You Want To".

== Music video ==
The video was shot in a beauty salon.

"Do You Want To" was the group's final single from the Off The Hook album, which achieved moderate to low success. It was released on January 16, 1996. The song sees group member Tameka "Tiny" Cottle taking the lead. The song's music video is the second (the first being "Who Can I Run To") that features Tiny's ex-fiancé and daughter Zonnique's father known by the nickname Z-Bo.

== Charts ==
=== Weekly charts ===
Chart (1996)	Peak position
US Billboard Hot 100	50
US Dance Singles Sales (Billboard)	3
US Hot R&B/Hip-Hop Songs (Billboard)	9
US Rhythmic Airplay (Billboard)	22

=== Year-end charts ===
Chart (1996)	Position
US Hot R&B/Hip-Hop Songs (Billboard)	58

== Certifications ==
Region	Certification	Certified units/sales
United States (RIAA)	Gold	500,000^{‡}
^{‡} Sales+streaming figures based on certification alone.
