= Tri-Cities High School =

Public high school in East Point, Georgia, United States

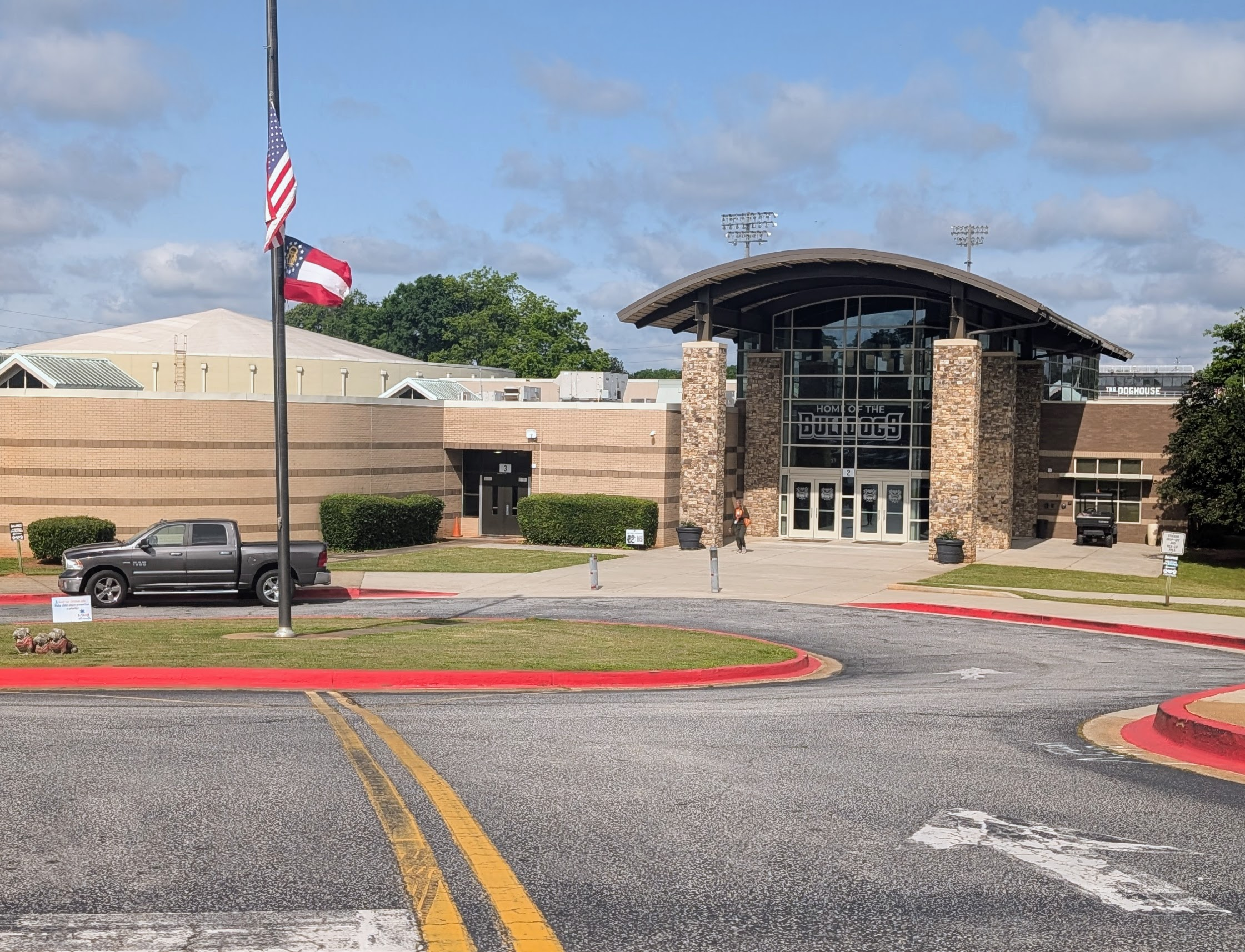

Location
- 2575 Harris Street; East Point, Georgia 30344; United States; 33°41′04″N 84°26′13″W

Information
- Type: Public high school
- Motto: "We Are Collaboratively Preparing Students for Post-Secondary Options"
- Established: 1988
- School district: Fulton County Public Schools
- CEEB code: 111175
- NCES School ID: 130228002124
- Principal: Amanda Gorham
- Faculty: 116.40 (on an FTE basis)
- Grades: 9–12
- Enrollment: 1,774 (2023–24)
- Student to teacher ratio: 15.24
- Campus: Suburban
- Colors: Red, black, and silver
- Mascot: Bulldog
- Nickname: TCHS
- Newspaper: Bulldog Pride
- Yearbook: Trilogy
- Website: https://tricities.fultonschools.org/

Tri-Cities High School is a public high school in East Point, Georgia, United States. It is a part of the Fulton County School System. The school opened in 1988 under the leadership of principal Dr. Herschel Robinson. It was originally formed by combining four schools: Woodland High School, Russell High School, College Park High School, and Hapeville High School. Tri-Cities serves sections of East Point and College Park, and all of Hapeville. The principal is Amanda Gorham.

== History ==
=== Woodland High School ===
Woodland High School opened in September 1982 as the result of the merger of Briarwood High School and Headland High School. Headland's campus became Paul D. West Middle School, which then fed into Woodland High. At the time, Fulton was slowly introducing the middle school concept countywide. The school closed with the 1988 merge. Woodland has since become Woodland Middle School. The original building was demolished for the current middle school prototype. As of June 2024, the site is under construction of the Conley Hills "replacement" elementary school.

== Notable alumni ==
- Andre 3000 (class of 1993) - musician, Outkast
- Cameron Ball (class of 2021) - NFL defensive tackle for the Indianapolis Colts
- Big Boi (class of 1993) - musician, Outkast
- Jamison Brewer (class of 1998) - basketball player, NBA's Indiana Pacers, New York Knicks
- Kandi Burruss (class of 1994) - musician, Xscape, cast member of The Real Housewives of Atlanta
- Edawn Coughman (class of 2006) - football player
- Simeon Cottle (class of 2022) - college basketball player
- Tiny Harris (class of 1993) - musician, singer-songwriter, Xscape
- Tristan Davis (class of 2004) - football player, NFL's Miami Dolphins, New Orleans Saints, Pittsburgh Steelers, Minnesota Vikings, and Washington Redskins
- Kalimba Edwards (class of 1997) - football player, NFL's Detroit Lions
- Gorilla Zoe (class of 2001) - musician, Boyz n da Hood
- Jonas Jennings (class of 1996) - football player, NFL's Buffalo Bills, San Francisco 49ers
- Kap G (class of 2012) - hip hop artist
- Miss Lawrence (class of 2001), television and film actor, and recurring cast member of The Real Housewives of Atlanta
- Sahr Ngaujah (class of 1995) - actor, Fela!, The Blacklist, Last Resort, Stomp the Yard
- Kawan Prather (class of 1992) - hip hop artist, record executive, record producer, songwriter
- LaTocha Scott (class of 1991) - musician, Xscape
- Tamika Scott (class of 1993) - musician, Xscape
- Saycon Sengbloh (class of 1996) - actor, singer, The Color Purple (musical), Wicked, Fela!, Motown the Musical
- Randy Thomas (class of 1995) - football player, NFL's New York Jets, Washington Redskins
- Kenan Thompson (class of 1996) - actor, comedian, All That, Kenan and Kel, and Saturday Night Live
- Shanell Woodgett (class of 1998) - singer-songwriter
- Wanita Woodgett (class of 2000) - also known as D.Woods, former member of Danity Kane

Jailen Josey (class of 2015) Pearl from SpongeBob The Musical - singer-songwriter
