= Russell High School (East Point, Georgia) =

Defunct high school in Georgia, United States

Coordinates: 33°41.102′N 84°26.142′W

Russell High School was a high school in East Point, Georgia, United States that opened in 1924. Industrialist and philanthropist John J. Eagan donated the land for the school, provided the school was named after his uncle, the late William A. Russell a Confederate general. After Eagan's father died, Russell gave financial and spiritual support to three-month-old John Eagan and his mother (Russell's sister).

== School history ==
The school closed in 1988 when it was combined with Headland High School (East Point), College Park High School (College Park) and Hapeville High School (Hapeville) to form Tri-Cities High School. At the time of its closing, Russell was the oldest school in the Fulton County system. The schools were merged due to declining populations, and the aging of the communities as North Fulton was exploding with growth at the time. When Tri-Cities was under construction, it also came at the cost of the now closed Harris Street Elementary School, which was merged with Parklane Elementary.

The official name of Tri-Cities High School is Tri-Cities High School/William A. Russell campus. This was done to satisfy the Russell family, and a memorial placard stands on Harris Street near the auditorium.

Russell High School was built in the shape of an "R" with the two "legs" made up of covered walkways headed towards the gymnasium and technical education shop buildings, which contain drafting, wood, metal, and woodworking classes. Later, in 1973, a newer two-story building which featured air conditioning and no classroom windows was constructed in front of the original classroom building.

Seniors of the graduating class painted their year of graduation on the roof of the old gym building each year that faced the football field.

== Notable alumni ==
- Kelvin Edwards, former NFL player
- Najee Mustafaa, former NFL player
- Tom Redmond, former NFL player
- Fletcher Thompson, former U.S. Congressman
