= Here for It =

EP by Xscape
- Released: March 2, 2018
- Recorded: 2017
- Genre: R&B
- Length: 21:38
- Label: RedZone Entertainment

Xscape chronology
Traces of My Lipstick (1998)	Here for It (2018)

Singles from Here for It
- 1. "Dream Killa" Released: December 1, 2017; 2. "Wifed Up" Released: December 1, 2017

Here for It is the first extended play (EP) from American recording R&B girl group Xscape. The EP was released on March 2, 2018, through RedZone Entertainment. This is Xscape's first release in twenty years and as a trio.

== Background and release ==
On February 28, 2017, Kandi Burruss, LaTocha Scott, Tameka "Tiny" Cottle and Tamika Scott gave their first interview in over twenty years on V-103 Atlanta. The group announced their reunion stating they had offers on the table but nothing was set in stone at the time. A few months later the group were announced to perform at the Essence Festival 2017. On December 27, 2017, it was announced Xscape would be releasing an EP in Spring 2018 as a trio titled "Here for It" and would feature six brand new songs including their two most recent singles "Dream Killa" and "Wifed Up". Burruss stated she would not be joining the group in new music as she had other projects going on and she would be playing Roxie Hart on Broadway's Musical Chicago. "Here for It" was given several release dates, January 12, 2018, February 14, 2018 and the most recent release date March 2, 2018.

== Singles ==
"Dream Killa" and "Wifed Up" were both released as singles on December 1, 2017.

=== Other singles ===
"Here for It" was released as the first promotional single on 1 January 2018.

== Track listing ==
Credits taken from TIDAL.

Here for It
No.	Title	Writer(s)	Producer(s)	Length
1.	"Memory Lane"	Christopher Stewart; J. Pierre Medor	J. Pierre Medor; C. Tricky Stewart	3:21
2.	"Dream Killa"	Alex Jacke; Todd Perry; Jenna Webb; Richard Stuckey; Laney Stewart; Jeremiah Bethea	Todd Perry; Laney Stewart	3:48
3.	"Wifed Up"	J. Pierre Medor; Jeremiah Bethea; Christopher A Stewart	Christopher A Stewart; Jeremiah Bethea; J. Pierre Medor	3:36
4.	"Here for It"	William Lovely; Christopher A Stewart; Jeremiah Bethea; J. Pierre Medor	J. Pierre Medor; Christopher A Stewart; William Lovely	3:44
5.	"Craving"	Bruce Robinson; Christopher Stewart; J. Pierre Medor	Medor; Stewart	3:15
6.	"Last of Me"	Christopher Stewart; Bruce Robinson; J. Pierre Medor	Medor; Stewart	3:54
Total length:				21:38

== Release history ==
Region	Date	Format	Label	Ref
Worldwide	March 2, 2018	Digital Download	RedZone Entertainment	
