= College Park High School (Georgia) =

High school in College Park, Georgia, United States

Coordinates: 33°39′23″N 84°27′02″W

- College Park, Georgia; United States

Information
- Closed: 1988 (replaced by Tri-Cities High School)

College Park High School was a high school in College Park, Georgia, United States. It closed in 1988 when it was combined with Woodland High School, Russell High School and Hapeville High School to form Tri-Cities High School. The campus of College Park High is now Frank McClarin Alternative High School. The name College Park was assigned to the nearby elementary school that was formerly Beavers-Thomas Elementary. Beavers-Thomas was consolidated with S.R. Young and George Longino to make College Park Elementary.
