= Love on My Mind (Xscape song) =

Single by Xscape

from the album Hummin' Comin' at 'Cha
- Released: January 6, 1994
- Recorded: 1993
- Genre: R&B; new jack swing
- Length: 3:49
- Label: So So Def
- Songwriters: Jermaine Dupri; Manuel Seal
- Producer: Jermaine Dupri

Xscape singles chronology
"Understanding" (1993)	"Love on My Mind" (1994)	"Tonight" (1994)

Music video
- "Love on My Mind" on YouTube

"Love on My Mind" is a song by American girl group Xscape. It was released in January 1994 by So So Def Recordings as the fourth single from their debut album, Hummin' Comin' at 'Cha (1993). It was written by Jermaine Dupri and Manuel Seal, and produced by Dupri. In the US, the song reached number 46 on the Billboard Hot 100 and number 16 on the Billboard Hot R&B/Hip-Hop Songs chart.

== Critical reception ==
Larry Flick from Billboard magazine wrote, "There doesn't appear to be any stopping this quartet of divas-in-training. After soothing with 'Understanding', they stomp hard with this loping, midtempo throwdown. Drenched with classic soul elements, track is a fine forum for the act's sultry harmonies, which simmer with just the right combination of aggression and seduction. Perhaps the best single so far from the platinum Hummin' Comin' at 'Cha."

== Formats and track listings ==
- CD single
1. "Love on My Mind" (JD street mix) – 4:05
2. "Love on My Mind" (Allstar remix) – 4:50
3. "Love on My Mind" – 3:49
4. "Love on My Mind" (JD extended street mix) – 5:54
5. "Love on My Mind" (JD extended club) – 5:44
6. "Love on My Mind" (JD street mix w/o rap) – 3:52
- Cassette single
1. "Love on My Mind" (LP version)
2. "Love on My Mind" (with rap)
- 7-inch 45 rpm vinyl single

A1. "Love on My Mind" (LP version) – 3:48
B1. "Love on My Mind" (with rap)

- 12-inch 33 1/3 rpm vinyl single

A1. "Love on My Mind" (JD street mix) – 4:05
A2. "Love on My Mind" (Allstar remix) – 4:50
A3. "Love on My Mind" – 3:49
B1. "Love on My Mind" (JD extended street mix) – 5:54
B2. "Love on My Mind" (JD extended club) – 5:44
B3. "Love on My Mind" (JD street mix w/o rap) – 3:52

== Charts ==
=== Weekly charts ===
Chart (1994)	Peak position
UK Club Chart (Music Week)	76
US Billboard Hot 100	46
US Dance Singles Sales (Billboard)	20
US Hot R&B/Hip-Hop Songs (Billboard)	16
US Rhythmic Airplay (Billboard)	13

=== Year-end charts ===
Chart (1994)	Position
US Hot R&B/Hip-Hop Songs (Billboard)	74
