= Don't Understand =

Don't Understand may refer to:

- "Don't Understand", a 1992 song by Hawkwind from Electric Tepee
- "Don't Understand", a 2023 song by Post Malone from Austin
