= My Little Secret =

Single by Xscape

from the album Traces of My Lipstick
- Released: July 7, 1998
- Recorded: 1998
- Genre: R&B
- Length: 4:27 (album version); 4:18 (single version)
- Label: Sony
- Songwriters: Jermaine Dupri; LaTocha Scott; Manuel Seal, Jr.
- Producer: Jermaine Dupri

Xscape singles chronology
"The Arms of the One Who Loves You" (1998)	"My Little Secret" (1998)	"Softest Place on Earth" (1998)

"My Little Secret" is a single by American girl group Xscape, produced by Jermaine Dupri. It was released on July 7, 1998, as the second single from their third studio album Traces of My Lipstick (1998). The song reached number nine on the Billboard Hot 100 and number two on Billboard's Hot R&B/Hip-Hop Singles & Tracks, becoming their last single to reach the top ten on both charts. The song talks about a sexual relationship on "the side" while cheating, with lyrics :everybody cheats, but you gotta know how, you gotta know when,; turning into a "little secret" love affair.

This was the last official single by the group before disbanding just after the release of the album.

This song has been sampled by Lil Wayne's Young Money group member and Teen Rapper Lil Twist on his first 2010 single "Little Secret" featuring Jermaine Dupri's protégé Bow Wow.

== Formats and track listings ==
US Maxi CD single

1. My Little Secret (LP version) – 4:31
2. My Little Secret (JD remix) – 3:31
3. My Little Secret (Timbaland remix) – 4:27
4. My Little Secret (Lil Jon remix) – 5:56
5. My Little Secret (Lil Jon instrumental) – 5:56

US Promo CD Single

1. My Little Secret (Radio Edit) – 4:15
2. My Little Secret (LP Version) – 4:29
3. My Little Secret (Instrumental) – 4:31
4. My Little Secret (Callout Hook #1) – 0:10
5. My Little Secret (Callout Hook #2) – 0:05

US CD Single

1. My Little Secret (LP Version) – 4:29
2. I Will (Excerpt) – 1:16
3. All About Me (Excerpt) – 0:57
4. All I Need (Excerpt) – 1:03

== Charts ==
=== Weekly charts ===
Chart (1998)	Peak position
US Billboard Hot 100	9
US Hot R&B/Hip-Hop Songs (Billboard)	2
US Rhythmic Airplay (Billboard)	6

=== Year-end charts ===
Chart (1998)	Position
US Hot R&B/Hip-Hop Songs (Billboard)	76

== Certifications ==
Region	Certification	Certified units/sales
United States (RIAA)	Platinum	1,000,000^{‡}
^{‡} Sales+streaming figures based on certification alone.
