= Understanding (song) =

Single by Xscape

from the album Hummin' Comin' at 'Cha
- Released: December 21, 1993
- Recorded: 1993
- Genre: R&B; hip-hop soul
- Length: 5:40
- Label: Sony Music (CD, cassette); Columbia (7" 45rpm)
- Songwriters: Jermaine Dupri; Manuel Seal
- Producers: Jermaine Dupri; Manuel Seal

Xscape singles chronology
"Just Kickin' It" (1993)	"Understanding" (1993)	"Love on My Mind" (1994)

Music video
- "Understanding" on YouTube

"Understanding" is a song by American R&B group Xscape. Written and produced by Jermaine Dupri and Manuel Seal, the song was released in December 1993 by Sony and Columbia Records, as the group's second single from their debut album, Hummin' Comin' at 'Cha (1993). The song reached number eight on the US Billboard Hot 100 and spent two weeks at number one on the Hot R&B Singles chart.

== Release and reception ==
Released in December 1993, "Understanding" entered the US Billboard Hot 100 singles chart the following month, and reached its peak of number eight in February 1994. The single spent 14 weeks in the top 40 portion of the chart. The song went to number one on the Hot R&B Singles chart, where it spent two weeks at the top. In other Billboard charts, the song reached number seven on the Hot 100 Singles Sales chart and number 15 on the Hot 100 Airplay chart. In February, the single was certified gold in the United States and has since been certified Platinum in March 2023. The song also reached number 24 in New Zealand. The "Understanding" music video, directed by Otis Sallid, entered the most-played weekly charts at MTV and BET in late 1993, and the video reached number one on The Box for the week ending January 29, 1994.

When recording the 1995 album Off the Hook, group member Kandi Buruss compared "Understanding" favorably to "Just Kickin' It", the group's previous single. "I felt like I could sing 'Just Kickin' It' in my sleep. Songs like 'Understanding', which was more vocally complex, had real feeling to it and that's what we wanted more of on our next album." Fellow group member Tameka Cottle noted that the appeal of the song "was really universal."

== Track listings ==
- CD/cassette single
1. "Understanding" (radio version)
2. "Understanding" (remix)
3. "Understanding" (Sexual Healing Mix)
4. "With You" (LP version)
- 7" vinyl single
1. "Understanding" (LP version) – 5:40
2. "Just Kickin' It" (remix) – 3:44

== Charts ==
=== Weekly charts ===
Chart (1994)	Peak position
Canada Retail Singles (The Record)	7
Europe (European Dance Radio)	22
New Zealand (Recorded Music NZ)	24
US Billboard Hot 100	8
US Hot R&B/Hip-Hop Songs (Billboard)	1
US Rhythmic Airplay (Billboard)	2
US Cash Box Top 100	7

=== Year-end charts ===
Chart (1994)	Position
US Billboard Hot 100	58
US Hot R&B/Hip-Hop Songs (Billboard)	19

== Certifications ==
Region	Certification	Certified units/sales
United States (RIAA)	Platinum	1,000,000^{‡}
^{‡} Sales+streaming figures based on certification alone.

== See also ==
- R&B number-one hits of 1994 (USA)
