= The Understanding =

The Understanding may refer to:

- The Understanding (Memphis Bleek album), 2000
- The Understanding (Röyksopp album), 2005
- "The Understanding" (The Amazing World of Gumball), a television episode
