= Who Can I Run To =

1995 single by Xscape

Single by Xscape

from the album Off the Hook
- Released: October 3, 1995
- Genre: R&B
- Length: 3:34
- Label: So So Def
- Songwriters: Charles B. Simmons, Frank Alstin Jr, and Richard Roebuck
- Producer: Jermaine Dupri

Xscape singles chronology
"Feels So Good" (1995)	"Who Can I Run To" (1995)	"Do You Want To" / "Can't Hang" (1996)

"Who Can I Run To?" is a song originally recorded by American girl group The Jones Girls, for their eponymous album released in 1979. The song was covered and made popular by American girl group Xscape, who recorded the song for their second album Off the Hook (1995). The song was released as the album's second single on October 3, 1995, in the United States, by So So Def Recordings. The song features lead vocals by LaTocha Scott and Tamika Scott.

"Who Can I Run To?" became Xscape's third top-ten single on the US Billboard Hot 100 as well as their third number-one single on the Hot R&B/Hip-Hop Songs. Internationally, it charted in New Zealand, Scotland, and the United Kingdom. The accompanying music video for "Who Can I Run To?", directed by Allan Grip Smith, was filmed in a restaurant. Billboard named the song number 58 on their list of 100 Greatest Girl Group Songs of All Time.

In 2024, The Jones Girls lead singer Shirley Jones released an alternate version of the song called "I Won't Tell (Who Can I Run To)" with a recreated instrumental and different lyrics, which appears on her album Reflections: In Loving Memory (2024).

== Background and composition ==
During the recording of the group's second album Off the Hook, Jermaine Dupri and Xscape member LaTocha Scott heard "Who Can I Run To?" by The Jones Girls. She later suggested to the group that they record their own version for the album. Initially rejecting the idea, the group recorded the song at Scott's insistence. Her younger sister and fellow group member Tamika Scott shared lead vocals with LaTocha on the song. Xscape's version was produced by Jermaine Dupri.

== Commercial performance ==
In the United States, "Who Can I Run To?" debuted at number 27 Billboard Hot 100 chart on October 14, 1995. After a total of six weeks, it peaked at number eight on November 18, 1995. The song held that position for one week before dropping to number twelve. In its final week, "Who Can I Run To?" fell to number 78 before falling off the chart after a total of twenty weeks. On the Hot R&B/Hip-Hop Songs, the song peaked at number one on November 11, 1995, and held the top position for one week. The single sold over one million copies in the United States, earning a platinum-certification by the Recording Industry Association of America (RIAA).

In the United Kingdom, "Who Can I Run To?" spent a total of three week on the UK Singles Chart, ultimately peaking at number 31. The single was more successful on the UK's Hip Hop and R&B Singles Chart, where it spent nine weeks on the chart and peaked at number six. On UK's Dance Singles Chart, the song peaked at number eleven, only spending two weeks on the chart.

== Track listing ==
US CD and cassette single

1. "Who Can I Run To?"
2. "Feels So Good" (UNtouchables Flava Smoothed Out Remix)

Australian CD single and Australian maxi-CD

1. "Who Can I Run To?"
2. "Who Can I Run To?" (Mr. Dupri Mix)
3. "Feels So Good" (Uno Clio Vocal Mix)
4. "Feels So Good" (Trunk Bumpin' Extended Mix)

European cassette single

1. "Who Can I Run To?" (LP Version)
2. "Do You Want To" (Remix With Rap)
3. "Who Can I Run To?" (LP Version Instrumental)
4. "Do You Want To" (Remix With Rap Instrumental)

European CD single

1. "Who Can I Run To?"
2. "Who Can I Run To?" (Mr. Dupri Mix)
3. "Do You Want To" (Remix With Rap)
4. "Do You Want To" (Quiet Storm)

European 12-inch single and European maxi-CD

1. "Who Can I Run To?"
2. "Feels So Good (20/20 12" Edit)"
3. "Feels So Good" (Uno Clio Vocal Mix)
4. "Feels So Good" (Uno Clio Instrumental)

UK 12-inch promo single

1. "Who Can I Run To?" (Mr. Dupri Mix)
2. "Who Can I Run To?" (Mr Dupri Extended Mix)
3. "Who Can I Run To?" (LP Version)
4. "Do You Want To" (Remix With Rap)
5. "Do You Want To" (Remix Instrumental)
6. "Do You Want To" (Acapella)

UK 12-inch single

1. "Who Can I Run To?" (Mr Dupri Extended Mix)
2. "Do You Want To" (Smoothed Out Remix)
3. "Love On My Mind" (JD Extended Street Mix)
4. "Love On My Mind" (Allstar Remix)

== Sampling ==
- American singer and rapper Anderson .Paak sampled the Xscape version for his song "Might Be" from the album Venice (2014).
- DJ Luke Nasty also sampled Xscape's version for the song "Might Be" (2015), a cover version of Anderson .Paak's song.
- American rapper Joyner Lucas samples the record on track 8 "When I Need Love" of his sophomore album, "Not Now I'm Busy".
- Sista sampled the song on their song "Good Thang" from their only album 4 All the Sistas Around da World (1995).

== Charts ==
=== Weekly charts ===
Chart (1995–1996)	Peak position
New Zealand (Recorded Music NZ)	23
Scotland Singles (OCC)	85
UK Singles (OCC)	31
UK Dance (OCC)	11
UK Hip Hop/R&B (OCC)	6
US Billboard Hot 100	8
US Hot R&B/Hip-Hop Songs (Billboard)	1
US Rhythmic Airplay (Billboard)	4

=== Year-end charts ===
Chart (1995)	Position
US Hot R&B/Hip-Hop Songs (Billboard)	57

== Certifications ==
Region	Certification	Certified units/sales
United States (RIAA)	Platinum	1,000,000^{‡}
^{‡} Sales+streaming figures based on certification alone.

== Other versions ==
- In 1995, R&B group Sista sampled the original version on "Good Thang" on their album 4 All the Sistas Around da World.
- In 1996, Ricky Dillard and the New Generation Chorale released the album, Worked It Out. It included a version of "Who Can I Run To?" that answered the question with "I need the Lord."
- At the end of 2008, this song was reworked into a house music track with vocals from Dawn Tallman, released on Thick Recordings.
- Juvenile sampled the original version of the song in 2007 for a song also called "Who Can I Run To?" featuring Mannie Fresh and Soulja Slim. It was on an album entitled "Diary of a Soulja" that was never released.

== See also ==
- R&B number-one hits of 1995 (USA)
