= Meet the Browns (play) =

2004 american stage play by Tyler Perry

- Written by: Tyler Perry
- Characters: Mr. Brown, Cora, L.B., Sarah, Vera, Will, Kim, Tracey, Rev. Oliver
- Original language: English
- Subject: Family, Death
- Genre: Comedy-Drama
- Setting: Church

Premiere
- Date premiered: August 31, 2004
- Place premiered: New Orleans

Meet the Browns is a 2004 American stage play written, produced and directed by Tyler Perry. It stars David & Tamela Mann as Mr. Brown & Cora, as they head off to see Brown's side of the family. The play is a spin off of 2003's Madea's Class Reunion, where it's revealed at the ending that Brown is Cora's long-lost father. The live performance released on VHS and DVD on October 27, 2004 was recorded live in Cleveland at the Palace Theatre in October 2004.

== Plot ==
The play begins with Brown's (David Mann) brother, L.B., and his wife, Sarah, in their house very early in the morning. Their daughter, Milay (whose real name is Millie Jean), soon comes in after being awakened at her own house by her parents. She soon learns that her grandfather (Brown and L.B.'s father) had died, and they need help preparing for the funeral. After a little convincing, Milay decides to help with funeral arrangements.

The next morning, Sarah and Milay are talking together while L.B. is upstairs crying. We soon learn that Milay was divorced and had a son who died. But before more can be learned, Mr. Brown and Cora come in and get acquainted with everyone. Everyone is surprised to learn that Brown is Cora's father and that Madea is her mother. Soon after, Will and his wife, Kim, come in. Will's overly drunk mother, Vera (singer Nicci Gilbert) comes in after them crying hysterically. She jumps upon seeing Brown, believing it was he that had died. When she is told it is her father that has died, she nearly collapses, and begins to cry again. Vera begins to insult Cora about her weight, and Cora starts yelling and pulls out a gun, and begins to act like her mother Madea, very crazy.

Meanwhile, the ladies are at the church when Tracey Stevens walks in. She tells them that she is pregnant and the father is a married man. Sarah gives Tracey her number and address and tells her to stop by any time. Soon only Cora is left in the church when Rev. Henry Oliver walks in. Cora soon takes a liking to the reverend as the two develop a romance.

Later, Tracey comes to the house and goes off with Sarah. Milay's ex-husband, Gerald shows up, giving his sympathy and planning to come to the funeral. Milay is outraged, mainly because Gerald didn't have the decency to come to their own son's funeral. Once Gerald leaves, Tracey then comes back and sees Will, stating that he is her baby's father. The revelation startles everyone, especially Kim, who storms out in tears.

Sarah, in a musical number, prays to God and hopes her family will be healed. After continuing to angrily reject Will's apologies, Sarah speaks to Kim, who tells her to make a list with every good thing Will had ever done for her along with every bad one. She continues, saying that if the bad outweighed the good, then she was free to let Will go. But if the good were to outweigh the bad, then she should fight completely for her marriage. Later, Tracy reveals that she is not pregnant and reveals her intentions, and Will and Kim finally reconcile. Gerald and Milay also reconcile. In a special feature on the DVD while Brown is teaching the guys how to play golf Madea calls "The Brown's House" looking for Cora and Brown telling them that she is in jail and she will tell them what she did in the next play, Madea Goes to Jail.

== Musical Numbers ==
All songs written and/or produced by Tyler Perry and Elvin D. Ross.

1. "Find A Good Woman (You'll Find a Good Thing") – Will, Brown and L.B.
2. "Ain't Nothing Like a Good Man" – Vera, Kim and Tracy
3. "Heart to Heart" – Cora
4. "Give It to Jesus" – Sarah
5. "Don't Give Up on Me" – Will
6. "I'll Fly Away" - Sarah and Cora
7. "In The Morning (When I Rise)"- L.B., Brown, Henry
8. "What Happened to The Man"- Milay and Gerald
9. "Silent Night" (ad-lib) - Brown
10. "This Is Your Grandaddy" (ad-lib) - Brown
11. "Ain't Nothing Like Family" - Sarah, Gerald, Will, Brown, Cora and Company

== Film adaptation ==
A film adaptation of the play was released on March 21, 2008. The film altered almost all the plot details found in the play with most of its storyline coming from the 2006 play, What's Done in the Dark.

=== Differences from the stage play ===
- Despite being the title characters, the Browns are only supporting characters and are only included in the story's subplot. In addition to this, they are only seen near the beginning of the film and near the end.
- The only characters that appear in the film are Mr. Brown, Cora, LB, Sarah, Will, and Vera.
- LB is more laid-back and friendlier than he is in the play
- Mr. Brown is not the central character or protagonist. He is only comic relief.
- Madea only appears in the film, as she did not appear in the stage play. (Although she did appear in a flashback in the very beginning & in a recorded phone call towards the middle of the play.)

== TV series ==
The TV series is based on the play and the film of the same name by Tyler Perry. The TV series involves several main characters from the film including, Mr. Brown, Cora Simmons, Will Brown, and features Vera Brown in a recurring role. David Mann, Tamela Mann, Lamman Rucker, and Jenifer Lewis all respectively reprise their characters from the film. L.B. does not make an appearance at any point in the series, although he is mentioned once in an episode of House of Payne.

== 2004/2005 Tour Dates ==
Scheduled shows
Date	City	Venue
August 31, 2004	New Orleans	Saenger Theatre
September 1, 2004	New Orleans	Saenger Theatre
September 2, 2004	New Orleans	Saenger Theatre
September 3, 2004	New Orleans	Saenger Theatre
September 4, 2004	New Orleans	Saenger Theatre
September 5, 2004	New Orleans	Saenger Theatre
September 7, 2004	Philadelphia	Merriam Theater
September 8, 2004	Philadelphia	Merriam Theater
September 9, 2004	Philadelphia	Merriam Theater
September 10, 2004	Philadelphia	Merriam Theater
September 11, 2004	Philadelphia	Merriam Theater
September 12, 2004	Philadelphia	Merriam Theater
September 15, 2004	Washington, D.C.	Warner Theatre
September 16, 2004	Washington, D.C.	Warner Theatre
September 17, 2004	Washington, D.C.	Warner Theatre
September 18, 2004	Washington, D.C.	Warner Theatre
September 19, 2004	Washington, D.C.	Warner Theatre
September 21, 2004	Washington, D.C.	Warner Theatre
September 22, 2004	Washington, D.C.	Warner Theatre
September 23, 2004	Washington, D.C.	Warner Theatre
September 24, 2004	Washington, D.C.	Warner Theatre
September 25, 2004	Washington, D.C.	Warner Theatre
September 26, 2004	Washington, D.C.	Warner Theatre
September 28, 2004	Philadelphia	Merriam Theater
September 29, 2004	Philadelphia	Merriam Theater
September 30, 2004	Philadelphia	Merriam Theater
October 1, 2004	Philadelphia	Merriam Theater
October 2, 2004	Philadelphia	Merriam Theater
October 3, 2004	Philadelphia	Merriam Theater
October 5, 2004	Columbus	Palace Theatre
October 6, 2004	Columbus	Palace Theatre
October 7, 2004	Cleveland	Palace Theatre
October 8, 2004	Cleveland	Palace Theatre
October 9, 2004	Cleveland	Palace Theatre
October 10, 2004	Cleveland	Palace Theatre
October 12, 2004	Houston	Verizon Wireless Theater
October 13, 2004	Houston	Verizon Wireless Theater
October 14, 2004	Houston	Verizon Wireless Theater
October 15, 2004	Houston	Verizon Wireless Theater
October 16, 2004	Houston	Verizon Wireless Theater
October 17, 2004	Houston	Verizon Wireless Theater
October 26, 2004	Baltimore	Morgan State University
October 27, 2004	Baltimore	Morgan State University
October 28, 2004	Baltimore	Morgan State University
October 29, 2004	Baltimore	Morgan State University
October 30, 2004	Baltimore	Morgan State University
October 31, 2004	Baltimore	Morgan State University
November 2, 2004	New York	Beacon Theatre
November 3, 2004	New York	Beacon Theatre
November 4, 2004	New York	Beacon Theatre
November 5, 2004	New York	Beacon Theatre
November 6, 2004	New York	Beacon Theatre
November 7, 2004	New York	Beacon Theatre
November 9, 2004	Chicago	Arie Crown Theater
November 10, 2004	Chicago	Arie Crown Theater
November 11, 2004	Chicago	Arie Crown Theater
November 12, 2004	Chicago	Arie Crown Theater
November 13, 2004	Chicago	Arie Crown Theater
November 14, 2004	Chicago	Arie Crown Theater
November 16, 2004	Newark	Newark Symphony Hall
November 17, 2004	Newark	Newark Symphony Hall
November 18, 2004	Newark	Newark Symphony Hall
November 19, 2004	Newark	Newark Symphony Hall
November 20, 2004	Newark	Newark Symphony Hall
November 21, 2004	Newark	Newark Symphony Hall
November 23, 2004	Atlanta	Atlanta Civic Center
November 24, 2004	Atlanta	Atlanta Civic Center
November 25, 2004	Atlanta	Atlanta Civic Center
November 26, 2004	Atlanta	Atlanta Civic Center
November 27, 2004	Atlanta	Atlanta Civic Center
November 28, 2004	Atlanta	Atlanta Civic Center
January 4, 2005	Washington, D.C.	Warner Theatre
January 5, 2005	Washington, D.C.	Warner Theatre
January 6, 2005	Washington, D.C.	Warner Theatre
January 7, 2005	Washington, D.C.	Warner Theatre
January 8, 2005	Washington, D.C.	Warner Theatre
January 9, 2005	Washington, D.C.	Warner Theatre
January 11, 2005	Akron	Akron Civic Center
January 12, 2005	Columbus	Veterans Memorial Auditorium
January 13, 2005	St. Louis	Fox Theatre
January 14, 2005	St. Louis	Fox Theatre
January 15, 2005	St. Louis	Fox Theatre
January 16, 2005	St. Louis	Fox Theatre
January 18, 2005	New York	Beacon Theatre
January 19, 2005	New York	Beacon Theatre
January 20, 2005	New York	Beacon Theatre
January 21, 2005	New York	Beacon Theatre
January 22, 2005	New York	Beacon Theatre
January 23, 2005	New York	Beacon Theatre
January 26, 2005	Miami	James L. Knight Center
January 27, 2005	Miami	James L. Knight Center
January 28, 2005	Miami	James L. Knight Center
January 29, 2005	Miami	James L. Knight Center
January 30, 2005	Miami	James L. Knight Center
February 1, 2005	Greenville	Peace Center for the Performing Arts
February 2, 2005	Greenville	Peace Center for the Performing Arts
February 4, 2005	Hampton	Hampton Coliseum
February 5, 2005	Hampton	Hampton Coliseum
February 6, 2005	Hampton	Hampton Coliseum
February 10, 2005	Jacksonville	Times-Union Center for the Performing Arts
February 11, 2005	Jacksonville	Times-Union Center for the Performing Arts
February 12, 2005	Jacksonville	Times-Union Center for the Performing Arts
February 13, 2005	Jacksonville	Times-Union Center for the Performing Arts
February 17, 2005	Kansas City	Kansas City Music Hall
February 18, 2005	Kansas City	Kansas City Music Hall
February 19, 2005	Kansas City	Kansas City Music Hall
February 20, 2005	Kansas City	Kansas City Music Hall
February 22, 2005	Detroit	Fox Theatre
February 23, 2005	Detroit	Fox Theatre
February 24, 2005	Detroit	Fox Theatre
February 25, 2005	Detroit	Fox Theatre
February 26, 2005	Detroit	Fox Theatre
February 27, 2005	Detroit	Fox Theatre
March 8, 2005	Tampa	Tampa Bay Performing Arts Center
March 9, 2005	Tampa	Tampa Bay Performing Arts Center
March 10, 2005	Tampa	Tampa Bay Performing Arts Center
March 11, 2005	Orlando	Orange County Convention Center
March 12, 2005	Orlando	Orange County Convention Center
March 13, 2005	Tallahassee	Tallahassee-Leon County Civic Center
March 15, 2005	Dallas	Bruton Theatre
March 16, 2005	Dallas	Bruton Theatre
March 17, 2005	Dallas	Bruton Theatre
March 18, 2005	Dallas	Bruton Theatre
March 19, 2005	Dallas	Bruton Theatre
March 20, 2005	Dallas	Bruton Theatre
March 29, 2005	Beaumont	Beaumont Civic Center
March 30, 2005	Beaumont	Beaumont Civic Center
March 31, 2005	San Antonio	San Antonio Municipal Auditorium
April 1, 2005	San Antonio	San Antonio Municipal Auditorium
April 2, 2005	Austin	Frank Erwin Center
April 3, 2005	Austin	Frank Erwin Center
April 7, 2005	Memphis	Orpheum Theatre
April 8, 2005	Memphis	Orpheum Theatre
April 9, 2005	Memphis	Orpheum Theatre
April 10, 2005	Memphis	Orpheum Theatre
April 12, 2005	Montgomery	Joe L. Reed Acadome
April 13, 2005	Montgomery	Joe L. Reed Acadome
April 19, 2005	Phoenix	Dodge Theatre
April 20, 2005	Phoenix	Dodge Theatre
April 21, 2005	Hollywood	Kodak Theatre
April 22, 2005	Hollywood	Kodak Theatre
April 23, 2005	Hollywood	Kodak Theatre
April 24, 2005	Hollywood	Kodak Theatre
April 26, 2005	Sacramento	Sacramento Memorial Auditorium
April 27, 2005	Sacramento	Sacramento Memorial Auditorium
April 28, 2005	Oakland	Paramount Theatre
April 29, 2005	Oakland	Paramount Theatre
April 30, 2005	Oakland	Paramount Theatre
May 1, 2005	Oakland	Paramount Theatre
May 3, 2005	Las Vegas	Aladdin Resort and Casino
May 4, 2005	Las Vegas	Aladdin Resort and Casino
May 5, 2005	Las Vegas	Aladdin Resort and Casino

== 2004 Live Cast ==
- David Mann as Leroy Brown
- Tamela Mann as Cora Jean Simmons
- Kendrick Mays as Larry Brown (L.B.)
- Joyce Williams as Sarah Brown
- Tamika Scott as Milay Brown
- Terrell Carter as Will Brown
- Demetria McKinney as Kim Brown
- Nicci Gilbert as Vera Brown
- Terrell Phillips as Gerald
- Euclid Gray as Rev. Henry Oliver
- Trina Braxton as Tracey Stevens

== 2004 Film Cast ==
- David Mann as Leroy Brown
- Tamela Mann as Cora Jean Simmons
- Kendrick Mays as Larry Brown (L.B.)
- Joyce Williams as Sarah Brown
- Tamika Scott as Milay Brown
- Terrell Carter as Will Brown
- Demetria McKinney as Kim Brown
- Nicci Gilbert as Vera Brown
- Terrell Phillips as Gerald
- Euclid Gray as Rev. Henry Oliver
- Trina Braxton as Tracey Stevens

After Tamika Scott left production, Trina Braxton assumed her role.

== 2005 Tour Cast ==
- David Mann as Leroy Brown
- Tamela Mann as Cora Jean Simmons
- Kendrick Mays as Larry Brown (L.B.)
- Di'ta Monique as Sarah Brown
- Tamika Scott as Milay Brown
- Terrell Carter as Will Brown
- Demetria McKinney as Kim Brown
- Nicci Gilbert as Vera Brown
- Terrell Phillips as Gerald
- Euclid Gray as Rev. Henry Oliver
- Trina Braxton as Tracey Stevens

== 2004 Band ==
- Mike Frazier - Musical Director / Bass Guitar
- Erick Morgan - Drums
- Donnie "D-Major" Boynton - Keyboards
- Clarence Hill - Keyboards

== 2005 Band ==
- Mike Frazier - Musical Director / Bass Guitar
- Erick Morgan - Drums
- Clarence Hill - Keyboards
- Denise White - Keyboards
