= Feels So Good (Xscape song) =

Single by Xscape

from the album Off the Hook
- Released: June 6, 1995
- Recorded: 1994
- Genre: R&B; hip-hop soul
- Length: 3:32
- Label: So So Def
- Songwriters: Jermaine Dupri; Kandi Burruss; Lowe
- Producer: Jermaine Dupri

Xscape singles chronology
"Tonight" (1994)	"Feels So Good" (1995)	"Who Can I Run To" (1995)

Music video
- "Feels So Good" on YouTube

"Feels So Good" is a song by American girl group Xscape, released in June 1995 by So So Def Recordings as the first single from their second album, Off the Hook (1995). The song was co-written and produced by Jermaine Dupri, and group members Kandi Burruss and LaTocha Scott sing lead on it. It reached No. 32 on the US Billboard Hot 100 and No. 8 on Billboard's Hot R&B/Hip-Hop Singles & Tracks. Elsewhere, it also charted in the United Kingdom at No. 34, and in New Zealand at No. 24.

== Critical reception ==
Pan-European magazine Music & Media wrote, "The phone is off the hook, the champagne in the ice bucket, the lights dimmed... Love is in the air, there's no escaping this new jill swing quartet at its smoothest."

== Charts ==
=== Weekly charts ===
Chart (1995)	Peak position
New Zealand (Recorded Music NZ)	24
Scottish Singles Sales (Official Charts)	78
UK Singles (Official Charts)	34
UK Dance (Official Charts)	22
UK Hip Hop/R&B (Official Charts)	7
US Billboard Hot 100	32
US Dance Singles Sales (Billboard)	24
US Hot R&B/Hip-Hop Songs (Billboard)	8
US Rhythmic Airplay (Billboard)	31

=== Year-end charts ===
Chart (1995)	Position
US Hot R&B/Hip-Hop Songs (Billboard)	44

== Certifications ==
Region	Certification	Certified units/sales
United States (RIAA)	Gold	500,000^{^}
^{^} Shipments figures based on certification alone.
