= Just Kickin' It =

1993 single by Xscape

Single by Xscape

from the album Hummin' Comin' at 'Cha
- B-side: "W.S.S. Deez Nuts"
- Released: August 13, 1993
- Length: 3:24
- Label: So So Def; Columbia
- Songwriters: Jermaine Dupri; Manuel Seal
- Producers: Jermaine Dupri; Manuel Seal

Xscape singles chronology
"Just Kickin' It" (1993)	"Understanding" (1993)

Music video
- "Just Kickin' It" on YouTube

"Just Kickin' It" is a song by American R&B group Xscape. Written and produced by Jermaine Dupri and Manuel Seal, It was released in August 1993 by So So Def and Columbia Records, as Xscape's first single from the group's debut album, Hummin' Comin' at 'Cha (1993). The single became the group's most commercially successful hit, peaking at number one on the US Cash Box Top 100, number two on the US Billboard Hot 100, and number one on the Billboard Hot R&B Singles chart. Its accompanying music video was nominated for Best New Artist Clip of the Year in the category for R&B/Urban at the 1994 Billboard Music Video Awards.

== Composition ==
"Just Kickin' It" is an urban ballad in which vocals are the focus, and the instrumental foundation is otherwise sparse. Jermaine Dupri, who according to his father, Columbia Records executive Michael Mauldin, wanted Xscape to be "the ghetto En Vogue," originally wrote the song as a summary of what men wanted from women. The lyrics were considered controversial by some female fans who believed the song's message was sexist. Former group member LaTocha Scott, however, dismissed the critics. "I've heard some females say that the song is unreal and that they can tell it was written by a man, but I don't think it makes it sexist. Shoot, everybody knows a man wants a woman who can cook."

== Release and reception ==
Released on August 13, 1993, "Just Kickin' It" entered the US Billboard Hot 100 chart at number 90 and reached the top 10 in four weeks. The song peaked at number two in October, spending a total of 17 weeks in the top 40. The single reached number one on the Hot R&B Singles chart, where it spent four weeks at the top. In November, the single was certified platinum in the United States and has since been certified double-platinum in March 2023. "Just Kickin' It" also peaked at number three in Canada, number 22 in New Zealand, and number 49 in the United Kingdom. The song earned the group a Soul Train Music Awards nomination in 1994 but lost to H-Town's "Knockin' Da Boots" in the Best R&B New Artist category.

== Track listings ==
- US 12-inch single

A1. "Just Kickin' It" (extended remix) – 5:36
A2. "Just Kickin' It" (remix instrumental) – 3:35
B1. "Just Kickin' It" (radio edit) – 3:25
B2. "W.S.S. Deez Nuts" – 0:44
B3. "Just Kickin' It" (radio edit instrumental) – 3:26

- US cassette single

A1. "Just Kickin' It" (radio edit)
A2. "W.S.S. Deez Nuts"
B1. "Just Kickin' It" (radio edit)
B2. "Understanding"
B3. "Is My Living in Vain"
B4. "Let Me Know"
B5. "Tonight"

- UK CD single
1. "Just Kickin' It" (radio version) – 3:34
2. "Just Kickin' It" (alternative radio version) – 3:24
3. "Just Kickin' It" (extended remix) – 5:35
4. "Just Kickin' It" (remix instrumental) – 3:35
5. "Just Kickin' It" (radio edit instrumental) – 3:26
- UK 12-inch single

A1. "Just Kickin' It" (extended remix) – 5:35
A2. "Just Kickin' It" (remix instrumental) – 3:35
B1. "Just Kickin' It" (alternative radio version) – 3:24
B2. "Just Kickin' It" (radio version) – 3:34
B3. "Just Kickin' It" (radio edit instrumental) – 3:26

- European CD single
1. "Just Kickin' It" (radio edit) – 3:25
2. "Just Kickin' It" (extended remix) – 5:36
- Australian CD single
1. "Just Kickin' It" (radio edit)
2. "W.S.S. Deez Nuts"
3. "Understanding"
4. "Is My Living in Vain"
5. "Let Me Know"
6. "Tonight"
7. "Just Kickin' It" (extended remix)

== Charts ==
=== Weekly charts ===
Chart (1993–1994)	Peak position
Australia (ARIA)	54
Canada Retail Singles (The Record)	3
Europe (European Dance Radio)	7
New Zealand (Recorded Music NZ)	22
UK Singles (Official Charts)	49
UK Airplay (ERA)	63
US Billboard Hot 100	2
US Dance Singles Sales (Billboard)	3
US Hot R&B/Hip-Hop Songs (Billboard)	1
US Pop Airplay (Billboard)	23
US Rhythmic Airplay (Billboard)	1
US Cash Box Top 100	1

=== Year-end charts ===
Chart (1993)	Position
US Billboard Hot 100	55
US Hot R&B Singles (Billboard)	16
US Maxi-Singles Sales (Billboard)	50

Chart (1994)	Position
US Billboard Hot 100	69
US Hot R&B Singles (Billboard)	46
US Cash Box Top 100	46

== Certifications ==
Region	Certification	Certified units/sales
United States (RIAA)	2× Platinum	2,000,000^{‡}
^{‡} Sales+streaming figures based on certification alone.

== Release history ==
Region	Date	Format(s)	Label(s)	Ref.
United States	August 13, 1993	—N/a	So So Def; Columbia	
Australia	November 29, 1993	CD; cassette	Columbia	

== See also ==
- List of number-one R&B singles of 1993 (U.S.)
