= Off the Hook (Xscape album) =

Studio album by Xscape
- Released: July 11, 1995
- Recorded: 1994–1995
- Genre: R&B
- Length: 44:37
- Labels: So So Def; Columbia
- Producers: Jermaine Dupri; Organized Noize; Daryl Simmons

Xscape chronology
Hummin' Comin' at 'Cha (1993)	Off the Hook (1995)	Traces of My Lipstick (1998)

Singles from Off The Hook
- 1. "Feels So Good" Released: June 6, 1995; 2. "Who Can I Run To" Released: October 3, 1995; 3. "Do You Want To/Can't Hang" Released: February 2, 1996

Off the Hook is the second studio album by American R&B group Xscape. It was released on July 11, 1995, through So So Def Recordings and Sony Music Entertainment. The album was produced by Jermaine Dupri, Organized Noize, and Daryl Simmons and features a guest appearance by MC Lyte. Off the Hook was preceded by the release of four singles — "Feels So Good", "Who Can I Run To" and "Can't Hang/Do You Want To".

The album debuted at number twenty-three on the US Billboard 200 and number three on the Top R&B/Hip-Hop Albums chart. It was eventually certified Platinum by the Recording Industry Association of America (RIAA) on November 16, 1995 and won the 1996 Soul Train Music Award for R&B/Soul Album of the Year – Group, Band or Duo.

== Critical reception ==
Professional ratings
Review scores
Source	Rating
AllMusic	4.5/5 stars
Entertainment Weekly	C+
The Source	(favorable)
Vibe	(positive)

In his review for AllMusic, senior editor Stephen Thomas Erlewine called the album "an improvement on their first record, demonstrating gains both in terms of music and lyrics [...] While they are still sexual on their second album, Off the Hook, it doesn't overwhelm the music as it did on their debut. Recording with producers Dupri, Daryl Simmons, and Organized Noize on various tracks, the group has developed into impressive musicians, with a thorough grasp of slow, seductive soul and slick funk. Off the Hook may run a little long – the 12 songs clock in at well over an hour – but the record proves that Xscape has staying power."

== Track listing ==
Off the Hook — Standard edition
No.	Title	Writer(s)	Producer(s)	Length
1.	"Do Your Thang"	Isaac Hayes	Jermaine Dupri	1:51
2.	"Feels So Good"	Dupri; Carl So-Lowe	Dupri; So-Lowe^{[a]}	3:32
3.	"Hard to Say Goodbye"	Xscape; Dupri; So-Lowe; Manuel Seal	Dupri	3:45
4.	"Can't Hang" (featuring MC Lyte)	Xscape; Dupri; So-Lowe; Lana Moorer	Dupri	3:46
5.	"Who Can I Run To"	Charles Simmons; Frank Alstin, Jr.; Richard Roebuck	Dupri	3:37
6.	"Hip Hop Barber Shop Request Line"	Eddie Weathers; Dupri; Clifford Smith; Robert Riggs	Dupri	0:49
7.	"Do You Want To"	Daryl Simmons	Simmons	5:42
8.	"What Can I Do"	Xscape; Dupri; Muhammad Bell; Larry Troutman; Roger Troutman; Shirley Murdock; Eric Sadler; Hank Shocklee; Ricky Walters	Dupri	3:05
9.	"Do Like Lovers Do"	Xscape; Dupri; Lowe	Dupri; So-Lowe^{[a]}	3:46
10.	"Work Me Slow"	Simmons	Simmons; Dupri^{[a]}	4:12
11.	"Love's a Funny Thing"	Kevin Kendricks	Dupri; So-Lowe^{[a]}	5:27
12.	"Keep It on the Real"	Brandon Bennett; Erika Nuri; Organized Noize	Organized Noize	4:23

Notes

- ^{^a} denotes co-producer
- "Who Can I Run To" is a cover of the song originally recorded by The Jones Girls
- "What Can I Do" contains an interpolation of "Computer Love" performed by Zapp

== Credits and personnel ==
=== Musicians ===
- Preston Crump, LaMarquis "Mark" Jefferson, Zachary Scott – bass
- Randy Hutchinson – drums
- Tommy Martin – guitar
- Bruno Speight – guitar
- Delores Major – violin
- Lomax Spaulding – guitar
- Ralph Stacy – bass

=== Production ===
- Executive producers: Jermaine Dupri, Michael Mauldin,
- Producers: Jermaine Dupri, Carl-So-Lowe, Organized Noize, Daryl Simmons
- Vocal assistance: Organized Noize, Xscape
- Engineers: Thom "TK" Kidd, Phil Tan, Bernasky Wall
- Assistant engineers: John Frye, Thomas Rickert
- Mixing: Mick Guzauski, Daryl Simmons, Phil Tan
- Mixing assistance: John Frye, Kevin Lively, Alex Lowe, Thomas Rickert
- Programming: Felipe Elgueta, John "J.R." Robinson, Glen Woodward

== Charts ==
=== Weekly charts ===
Chart (1995)	Peak position
UK Albums (Official Charts)	127
UK R&B Albums (Official Charts)	19
US Billboard 200	23
US Top R&B/Hip-Hop Albums (Billboard)	3

=== Year-end charts ===
Chart (1995)	Position
US Billboard 200	118
US Top R&B/Hip-Hop Albums (Billboard)	27

Chart (1996)	Position
US Billboard 200	150
US Top R&B/Hip-Hop Albums (Billboard)	41

== Certifications ==
Region	Certification	Certified units/sales
United States (RIAA)	Platinum	1,000,000^{^}
^{^} Shipments figures based on certification alone.
