= Ol' Skool =

OL' Skool
- Origin: St. Louis, Missouri, United States
- Genres: New jack swing, urban R&B
- Years active: 1996-present
- Label: Universal Records
- Members: Jason Little; Jerome "Pookie" Lane; Tony Love; Curtis Jefferson; Bobby Crawford

Ol' Skool was an American new jack swing and urban R&B group from St. Louis, Missouri that consisted of Jason Little (vocals), Jerome "Pookie" Lane (vocals), Tony Herron (vocals), Curtis Jefferson (vocals, bass) and Bobby Crawford (vocals, drum programming, keyboards). After putting out their debut single, "Set You Free", in late 1997, they were discovered by Keith Sweat, who executive produced and guest-appeared on their debut album, Ol' Skool, released in February 1998. Their follow-up album, R.S.V.P., was issued in 2000.
