= The Arms of the One Who Loves You =

Single by Xscape

from the album Traces of My Lipstick
- Released: February 14, 1998
- Recorded: 1997
- Genre: R&B; pop; soul
- Length: 4:19
- Label: So So Def; Columbia
- Songwriter: Diane Warren
- Producer: Guy Roche

Xscape singles chronology
"Am I Dreamin'" (1997)	"The Arms of the One Who Loves You" (1998)	"My Little Secret" (1998)

"The Arms of the One Who Loves You" is a 1998 pop ballad by American recording group Xscape. The song was released on February 14, 1998, as the lead single from their third studio album, Traces of My Lipstick (1998). It was later sent to mainstream urban radio stations in the United States on March 31, 1998 and Top 40 on April 7, 1998, and was a hit for the group. The Scott sisters share leads vocals on the song. It peaked at No. 7 on the Billboard Hot 100 chart and No. 4 on the Hot R&B/Hip Hop Songs chart. It sold 800,000 copies, earning a gold certification from the RIAA.

The music video for "The Arms of the One Who Loves You" was made in early February 1998.

The JD's Mood Mix samples Tyrone Davis' "In the Mood". It is an altered version of SWV's "When U Cry" which was recorded in 1997.

== Formats and track listings ==
These are the formats and track listings of promo single-releases of "The Arms of the One Who Loves You".

1. "The Arms of the One Who Loves You" (JD's mood mix) – 4:13
2. "The Arms of the One Who Loves You" (JD's mood mix w/out rap) – 4:13
3. "The Arms of the One Who Loves You" (JD's mood mix instrumental) – 4:13
4. "The Arms of the One Who Loves You" (Frankie Knuckles club mix) – 9:05
5. "The Arms of the One Who Loves You" (Frankie Knuckles reprise) – 4:39
6. "The Arms of the One Who Loves You" (Flash Dance AKA club mix) – 4:32

== Charts ==
=== Weekly charts ===
Chart (1998)	Peak position
New Zealand (Recorded Music NZ)	16
Scotland Singles (OCC)	87
UK Singles (OCC)	46
UK Hip Hop/R&B (OCC)	13
US Billboard Hot 100	7
US Hot R&B/Hip-Hop Songs (Billboard)	4
US Rhythmic Airplay (Billboard)	21

=== Year-end charts ===
Chart (1998)	Position
US Billboard Hot 100	53
US Hot R&B/Hip-Hop Songs (Billboard)	23

== Certifications ==
Region	Certification	Certified units/sales
United States (RIAA)	Gold	500,000^{^}
^{^} Shipments figures based on certification alone.
