= Xscape (group) =

American R&B group

- Also known as: Xscap3
- Origin: Atlanta, Georgia, U.S.
- Genres: R&B; hip hop; soul
- Years active: 1990–2000; 2005–2006; 2017–present
- Labels: So So Def; Columbia; RedZone
- Members: Kandi Burruss; Tameka Cottle; Tamika Scott
- Past members: LaTocha Scott; Tamera Coggins; Kiesha Miles

Xscape (/ɪkˈskeɪp/ or /ɛkˈskeɪp/) (also known as Xscap3) is an American girl group from Atlanta, Georgia, formed in 1990 by Kandi Burruss, Tamera Coggins, Tameka "Tiny" Cottle, LaTocha Scott, and Tamika Scott. The following year, Coggins left the group and Xscape became a quartet. They were discovered by Jermaine Dupri who signed the group to his So So Def label. The group released their debut album Hummin' Comin' at 'Cha in 1993, which spawned two top-ten Billboard Hot 100 hits, "Just Kickin' It" and "Understanding". The album sold over one million copies in the United States, earning a platinum-certification by the Recording Industry Association of America (RIAA).

The group's second album Off the Hook was released in 1995, which became certified platinum in the United States. The album's first two singles "Feels So Good" and "Who Can I Run To" were both certified gold in the United States. Their third and final album Traces of My Lipstick was released in 1998, which earned a platinum certification in the United States. The group disbanded in 2000 to pursue solo projects and reformed in 2017. In early 2018, Burruss briefly departed from the group and the remaining members performed as Xscap3. Xscap3 released an extended play titled Here for It in March 2018. In late 2022, LaTocha Scott departed from the group to pursue her solo career, leaving Xscape to continue performing as a trio.

As of 2023, Xscape has sold more than 12 million records in the United States. The group has scored a total of six top-ten Billboard Hot 100 songs.

== History ==
=== 1990–1994: Formation and early years ===
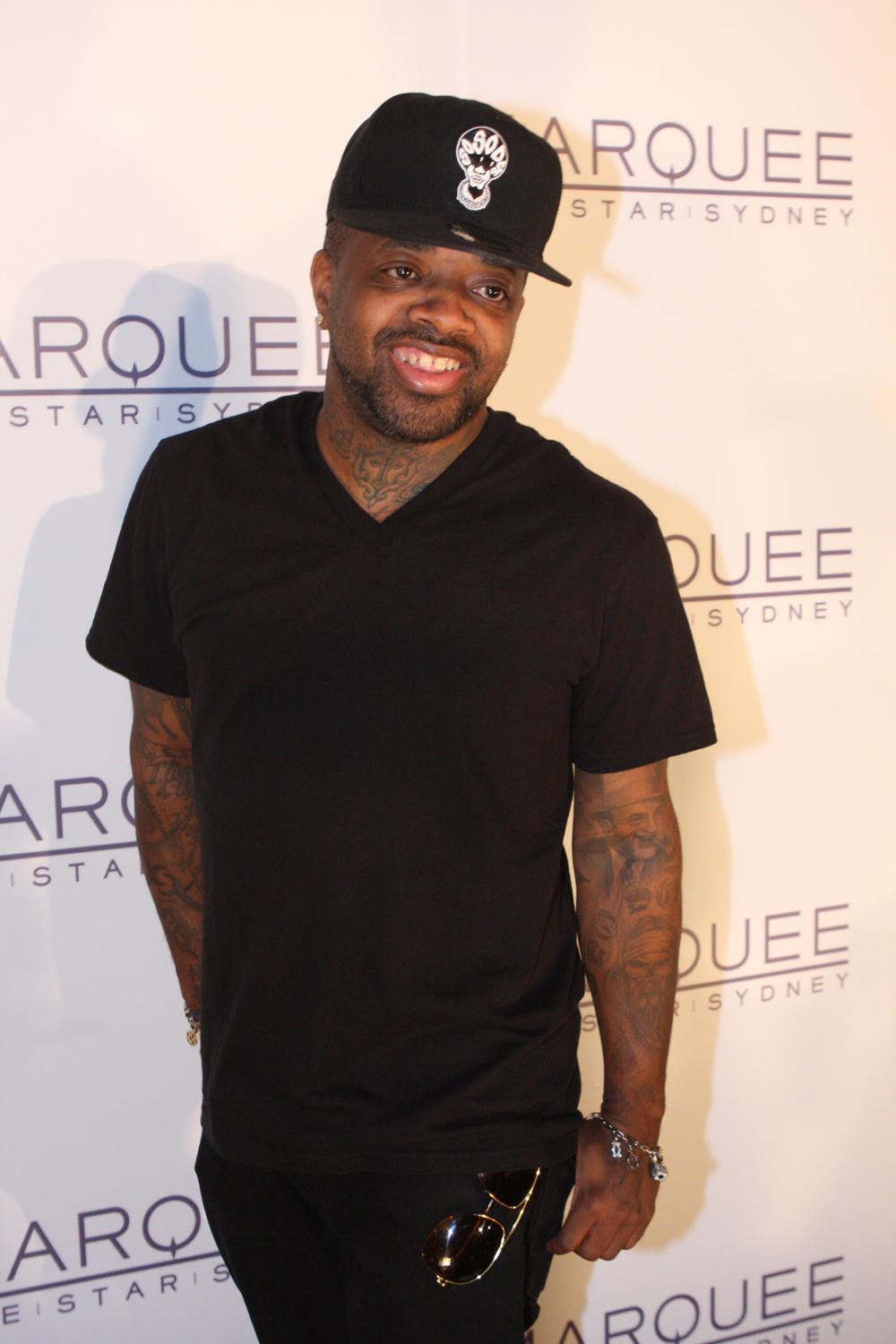
Jermaine Dupri produced Xscape's debut album, which featured multi-platinum single "Just Kickin' It"

In 1990, Xscape was formed by Kandi Burruss, Tamera Coggins, Tameka Cottle, sisters LaTocha Scott and Tamika Scott. The group met while attending Tri-Cities High School in East Point, Georgia. In 1991, they were invited to sing at Jermaine Dupri's birthday party. Dupri eventually signed the group to his record label So So Def. Coggins departed from the group in 1992.

Xscape first charted in August 1993 with "Just Kickin' It", the lead single from their debut album Hummin' Comin' at 'Cha, which was released in the United States on October 12, 1993, featuring productions by Jermaine Dupri and Manuel Seal and a video by Rich Murray who had previously worked with Dupri on videos for Kris Kross. Humming Comin' at 'Cha peaked at number seventeen on Billboard 200 and number three on the Billboard Top R&B/Hip-Hop Albums. The album sold over one million copies in the United States, earning a platinum-certification by the Recording Industry Association of America (RIAA). The album's lead single "Just Kickin' It" reached number one on the Billboard Hot R&B/Hip-Hop Singles & Tracks and number two on the Billboard Hot 100. It also sold over two million copies in the United States, earning a two-time platinum certification by the RIAA. The album's second single "Understanding" peaked in the top-ten on Billboard's Hot 100 and sold over one million copies in the United States, becoming certified platinum by the RIAA.

The group toured as the opening act for Salt-N-Pepa's Very Necessary 12 Play Tour in 1994. Meanwhile, the group featured on a song called "Who's That Man" from the soundtrack album of the comedy film The Mask.

=== 1995–1997: Off the Hook ===
After the success of their debut album, Xscape re-entered the studio, bringing in a new lineup of producers, including Organized Noize, Kevin Kendricks, and Daryl Simmons. They released their second album Off the Hook on July 11, 1995. Off the Hook peaked at number twenty-three on the Billboard 200 and number three on the R&B Albums chart. "Feels So Good" was released in June 1995 as the album's lead single and peaked at number thirty-two on the Billboard Hot 100. Off the Hook has been credited as developing Xscape into a mature sound.

"Who Can I Run To", a cover version of The Jones Girls's 1979 song, was released as the album's second single on October 3, 1995. The song reached the top of R&B chart and top-ten on Billboard Hot 100. The song also earned a platinum certification by the RIAA. "Do You Want To" and "Can't Hang" were released as double A side singles, which became top-ten hit on R&B chart. Off the Hook eventually sold over one million copies in the United States, gaining platinum certification by the RIAA. The album also won Soul Train Music Award for R&B/Soul Album of the Year – Group, Band or Duo in 1996. In 1996, the group toured with LL Cool J and R. Kelly on The Down Low Top Secret Tour. Xscape also featured on MC Lyte's song "Keep On, Keepin' On which became a top-ten hit on Billboard Hot 100.

=== 1998–2004: Traces of My Lipstick, hiatus and side projects ===
Xscape recorded their third album, Traces of My Lipstick, from mid-1997 until early 1998. LaTocha Scott announced her plans to her group members of her intentions to pursue a solo career. She signed a solo recording contract with So So Def, resulting in the renegotiation of the group's contract. Scott began recording her solo album titled Life Goes On, during the recording of the group's third album Traces of My Lipstick. Traces of My Lipstick was released in May 1998, selling 78,000 copies in its first week sales. The first two singles, "The Arms of the One Who Loves You" and "My Little Secret" reached the top ten in the United States and earned gold certification by the RIAA.

During the group's promo tour in late 1998, Scott left the group to focus on her solo career and shortly after, the group went on hiatus. Scott's debut single "Promises" was released on a compilation album titled eMusic Presents NFL Jams in 1998. In June 1999, Traces of My Lipstick became certified platinum for selling over one million copies in the United States. During the group's hiatus, Burruss and Cottle formed a duo called "KAT" (an acronym for Kandi and Tiny) and shopped for a record deal. Despite unsuccessfully securing a record deal, a song "No Scrubs" that was written for their album was given to female group TLC for their album FanMail (1999). Release as the lead single of TLC's FanMail album, "No Scrubs" reached the top of Billboard Hot 100 in the United States and several other countries. The song also won Burruss and Cottle a Grammy Award for Best R&B Song at 42nd Annual Grammy Awards for contribution as songwriters. Burruss later secured a solo record deal with Columbia Records after the success of "Bills, Bills, Bills", a number-one hit she co-wrote for female group Destiny's Child's album The Writing's on the Wall in May 1999. Burruss also co-wrote their album's second single "Bug a Boo" as well as "So Good", "Hey Ladies", "She Can't Love You".

In October 1999, LaTocha Scott released a single titled "Liar Liar" on the soundtrack of comedy drama film The Best Man. By 2000, Scott experienced multiple push-back release dates on her album Life Goes On before it was ultimately shelved under Jermaine Dupri's So So Def record label. In early 2000, Xscape briefly reformed but Burruss declined to rejoin the group. As a trio, Xscape appeared on Lil' Bow Wow's debut single "Bounce with Me". The group disbanded in late 2000.

In September 2000, Burruss released her debut solo album titled Hey Kandi.... The album's lead single "Don't Think I'm Not" became a top-ten hit in the United Kingdom and earned a silver certification by the British Phonographic Industry (BPI). In 2003, LaTocha Scott released an album titled Solo Flight 404 on Raw Deal Records.

=== 2005–2013: Failed comeback ===
In 2005, Xscape reformed with original members Tameka Cottle, LaTocha Scott, and Tamika Scott. The newly reformed lineup also included new member Kiesha Miles as Burruss declined to rejoin the group. The group recorded an album titled Unchained which was set for release in 2005 but remained shelved. They released a single "What's Up" which failed to chart. The group disbanded in 2006.

In February 2013, Jermaine Dupri attempted to reform Xscape for the twentieth anniversary and celebration of So So Def Records but Burruss and Cottle declined, leaving LaTocha Scott and Tamika Scott to perform as Xscape at the So So Def 20th Anniversary Concert.

=== 2017–present: Reunion ===
On June 25, 2017, the original members performed at BET Awards 2017, marking their first performance together in eighteen years. In September 2017, the group made their first appearance together on daytime television on The Wendy Williams Show, performing "My Little Secret" and "Understanding". In November 2017, the group embarked on their headlining tour The Great Xscape Tour. In late 2017, Xscape premiered their own reality show titled Xscape: Still Kickin' It on Bravo network. The reality show was centered around the group resolving internal conflicts, preparation and rehearsals for their upcoming tour, and personal endeavors.

After the conclusion of The Great Xscape Tour in January 2018, Burruss departed from the group to perform as Matron Mama Morton in Broadway production of Chicago. Cottle, LaTocha Scott, and Tamika Scott began performing under the group name Xscap3. In March 2018, Xscap3 released an extended play titled Here for It, which spawned two singles: "Wifed Up" and "Dream Killa". In July 2018, Burruss rejoined Xscape for their performance at the Essence Festival. In 2019, Xscape were also honored at the Black Music Honors.

On May 8, 2021, Verzuz presented a pre-Mother's day battle featuring both Xscape and female group SWV. In November 2022, the group were honorary recipients of the Lady Of Soul Award at the 2022 Soul Train Awards. In December 2022, LaTocha Scott departed from the group to pursue her solo career, following a dispute between her husband and manager, Rocky Bivens, and a promoter. SWV & Xscape: The Queens of R&B, a reality show centered around both female groups, premiered on March 5, 2023. In March 2024, Xscape co-headlined "The Queens of R&B Tour" alongside SWV.

== Members ==
=== Current ===
- Kandi Burruss (1990–1999, 2017–present)
- Tameka Cottle (1990–1999, 2000, 2005–2006, 2017–present)
- Tamika Scott (1990–1999, 2000, 2005–2006, 2017–present)

=== Former ===
- LaTocha Scott (1990–1999, 2000, 2005–2006, 2017–2022)
- Tamera Coggins (1990–1992)
- Kiesha Miles (2005–2006)

== Discography ==
Studio albums

- Hummin' Comin' at 'Cha (1993)
- Off the Hook (1995)
- Traces of My Lipstick (1998)

== Tours ==
Headlining

- Traces of my Lipstick Promo Tour (1998)
- The Great Xscape Tour (2017–18)
- Xscap3 Tour (2018–20)
- The Xscape Room Tour (2027)

Co-headlining

- R&B Music Experience (2023; with Tyrese)
- The Queens of R&B Tour (2024; with SWV)

Special guest

- So So Def 25th Anniversary Tour (Jermaine Dupri) (2018)

Opening act

- Very Necessary 12 Play Tour (Salt-N-Pepa and R. Kelly) (1994)
- The Down Low Top Secret Tour (LL Cool J and R. Kelly) (1996)
