= Hummin' Comin' at 'Cha =

Studio album by Xscape
- Released: October 12, 1993
- Recorded: 1992–1993
- Genres: R&B; pop
- Length: 35:44
- Labels: So So Def; Columbia
- Producers: Jermaine Dupri; Manuel Seal, Jr.; Organized Noize

Xscape chronology
Hummin' Comin' at 'Cha (1993)	Off the Hook (1995)

Singles from Hummin' Comin' at 'Cha
- 1. "Just Kickin' It" Released: August 17, 1993; 2. "Understanding" Released: December 21, 1993; 3. "Love on My Mind" Released: January 6, 1994; 4. "Tonight" Released: April 11, 1994

Hummin' Comin' at 'Cha is the debut studio album by American R&B group Xscape. Released on October 12, 1993, by So So Def Recordings (as the label's inaugural release) and Columbia Records, the album produced the singles "Just Kickin' It", "Understanding", "Love on My Mind" and “Tonight”, and peaked at number 17 on the Billboard 200 and number 3 on the U.S. Billboard Top R&B/Hip-Hop albums chart, becoming certified platinum by the RIAA with sales over one million copies sold.

In a January 2022 interview with Rory & Mal, Jermaine Dupri described meeting Manuel Seal, Jr. in Lennox Square Mall in Atlanta, Georgia. After a conversation about music and their respective careers, Dupri invited Seal, Jr. to his home and they completed Hummin' Comin' at 'Cha in one week. Dupri reiterated this story in an April 2025 interview on the R&B Money Podcast (hosted by singer Tank), where he mentioned the album was completed in two weeks.

== Critical reception ==
Professional ratings
Review scores
Source	Rating
AllMusic	4.5/5 stars
Philadelphia Daily News	1.5/4 stars
The Village Voice	C

The Baltimore Sun noted that "the melodies [Dupri] hands this harmonizing foursome are strong enough to leave any listener humming along, but he's also smart enough to leave room for rap and showy solo passages." The Philadelphia Daily News opined that "the production has an ultra-light feel, verging on the cheap 'n' cheesy."

== Track listing ==
#	Title	Length	Lead vocals	Writer(s)
1.	"Hummin Comin’ at Cha (Intro)"	1:12	Xscape	Jermaine Dupri
2.	"Just Kickin' It"	3:24	Kandi (adlibs: Latocha)	Dupri, Seal
3.	"Pumpin’"	3:59	Kandi (guest vocals: JD)	Dupri
4.	"Let Me Know"	3:40	Xscape	Bell, Dupri, Seal
5.	"Understanding"	5:41	Xscape	Seal
6.	"W.S.S Deez Nuts"	0:44	JD	Weather
7.	"With You"	4:04	Kandi/Tiny/LaTocha	Bennett, Etheridge, Organized Noize
8.	"Is My Living in Vain"	2:48	Xscape	Elbernita "Twinkie" Clark
9.	"Love on My Mind"	3:48	LaTocha & Tamika	Dupri, Seal
10.	"Tonight"	4:04	Xscape	Bennett, Etheridge, Organized Noize
11.	"Just Kickin’ It (Remix)"	3:32	Kandi (adlibs: Latocha)	Dupri, Seal

== Credits and personnel ==
=== Musicians ===
- LaMarquis Mark Jefferson - bass, guitar
- Jermaine Dupri - piano
- Jermaine Dupri, Francesca Restrepo - art direction
- McKinley Horton - keyboard, product
- Kevin Lively, Phil Tan - engineer
- Bernie Grundman, Joe Nicolo, Phil Nicolo, Howie Weinberg - mastering
- Jermaine Dupri, Phil Tan - mixing

=== Production ===
- Vocal assistance: Dionne Farris
- Executive Producer: Jermaine Dupri, M 2 Da T 2 Da M

== Charts ==
=== Weekly charts ===
Chart (1993)	Peak position
US Billboard 200	17
US Top R&B/Hip-Hop Albums (Billboard)	3

=== Year-end charts ===
Chart (1993)	Position
US Top R&B/Hip-Hop Albums (Billboard)	69
Chart (1994)	Position
US Billboard 200	78
US Top R&B/Hip-Hop Albums (Billboard)	20

== Certifications ==
Region	Certification	Certified units/sales
United States (RIAA)	Platinum	1,000,000^{^}
^{^} Shipments figures based on certification alone.
