= Manuel Seal =

American singer and songwriter (1960–2026)

Background information
- Born: Manuel Lonnie Seal Jr. September 26, 1960; Freeport, Illinois, U.S.
- Died: September 27, 2026 (aged 66)
- Genres: Pop, R&B, gospel, soul, hip hop
- Occupations: Record producer; songwriter; arranger; vocal coach
- Instruments: Piano, keyboards, guitar, synthesizer bass, saxophone, organ, flute
- Years active: 1992–2026
- Labels: Seal Music Productions, So So Def

Manuel Lonnie Seal Jr. (September 26, 1960 – September 27, 2026) was an American multi-instrumentalist, record producer, composer, singer, songwriter, vocal coach and arranger. He was credited, often in tandem with Jermaine Dupri, on releases by Mariah Carey, Janet Jackson, Usher, TLC, Aretha Franklin, Xscape, Cherish, Tyrese, Alicia Keys, Gerald Levert, Marc Dorsey and Destiny's Child, among others.

Seal received one Grammy Award from 13 nominations.

== Early life ==
Manuel Lonnie Seal Jr. was born in Chicago, Illinois, on September 26, 1960, to parents Manuel and Betty Seal. He also had two younger sisters. The family moved to Freeport, Illinois when Manuel was three. Both of his parents had musical backgrounds and they got him into piano lessons at the age of 5. His father was in a band, sang and played multiple instruments and his mother sang in the church choir. They lived in the projects and when Manuel was 10, his father left the family, moving back to Chicago. His mother was a school teacher and worked hard to get her and her children a home. By the time Manuel was in high school, his mother had purchased a home that he and his sisters still share today. Because his grade school did not offer guitar, Manuel started playing the flute at that time. He was already excelling at the piano and wanted to learn every instrument he could. By high school, he had formed a band and traveled to the few towns near him to perform. He was performing at bars (while being underage) and picked up a huge fan base throughout the Midwest. He traveled extensively, performing and perfecting his skills as a musician.

== Career ==
Seal was found by a manager while working with Grammy Award-winning artist Ann Nesby. He and Ann had known each other for years, as they are from the same two small towns. His manager had gotten him meetings in LA and he stayed there for three months working at BMG. He then moved back to Freeport. Soon thereafter, his manager set up meetings for him in Atlanta, Georgia. At the hotel one night, he was found by Jermaine Dupri in the lobby while playing the piano and singing. He had attracted a huge crowd and Jermaine signed him instantly.

He began work with Al Jarreau. The first major success came with Xscape. Manuel wrote, produced and arranged their first album, Hummin' Comin' at 'Cha (1993). He wrote two #1's and a top 10 on that album. The surprise hit on that album was "Understanding", which Manuel wrote in his hotel room one night between sessions.

Da Brat's Funkdafied (1994) was the next huge success for him. He is the vocals on the lead single "Funkdafied", and composed all the music on the album. It was the first time a female rapper reached Platinum status. TLC's CrazySexyCool (1994) sold 23 million copies worldwide. Manuel wrote three songs on that album. Usher's My Way (1997) album went 7× Platinum and Manuel wrote seven of the ten songs on the album, including "You Make Me Wanna", "My Way", and "Nice and Slow". Mariah Carey's Daydream (1995) album sold 25 million copies worldwide, making it one of the best-selling albums of all time. Manuel co-wrote "Always Be My Baby", among others. He went on to write numerous hits for Jagged Edge, Aretha Franklin, Destiny's Child, Bebe Winans, LSG, Johnny Gill, George Benson, Tamia, Aaron Hall, Mary J. Blige, Monica, Lionel Richie, Ashanti and Gerald Levert.

Major success came with "My Boo" from Usher's Confessions (2004, Special Edition), which went on to sell more than 10 million copies in America. Seal also won a Grammy Award for his contribution on Mariah Carey's "We Belong Together" from The Emancipation of Mimi (2005). He continued with Mariah Carey's follow-up album E=MC² (2008), Usher's Here I Stand (2008), and Janet Jackson's 20 Y.O. (2006) and Discipline (2008).

== Death ==
Seal died on September 27, 2026, one day after his 66th birthday.
