= PJ Morton discography =

Discography of American singer PJ Morton

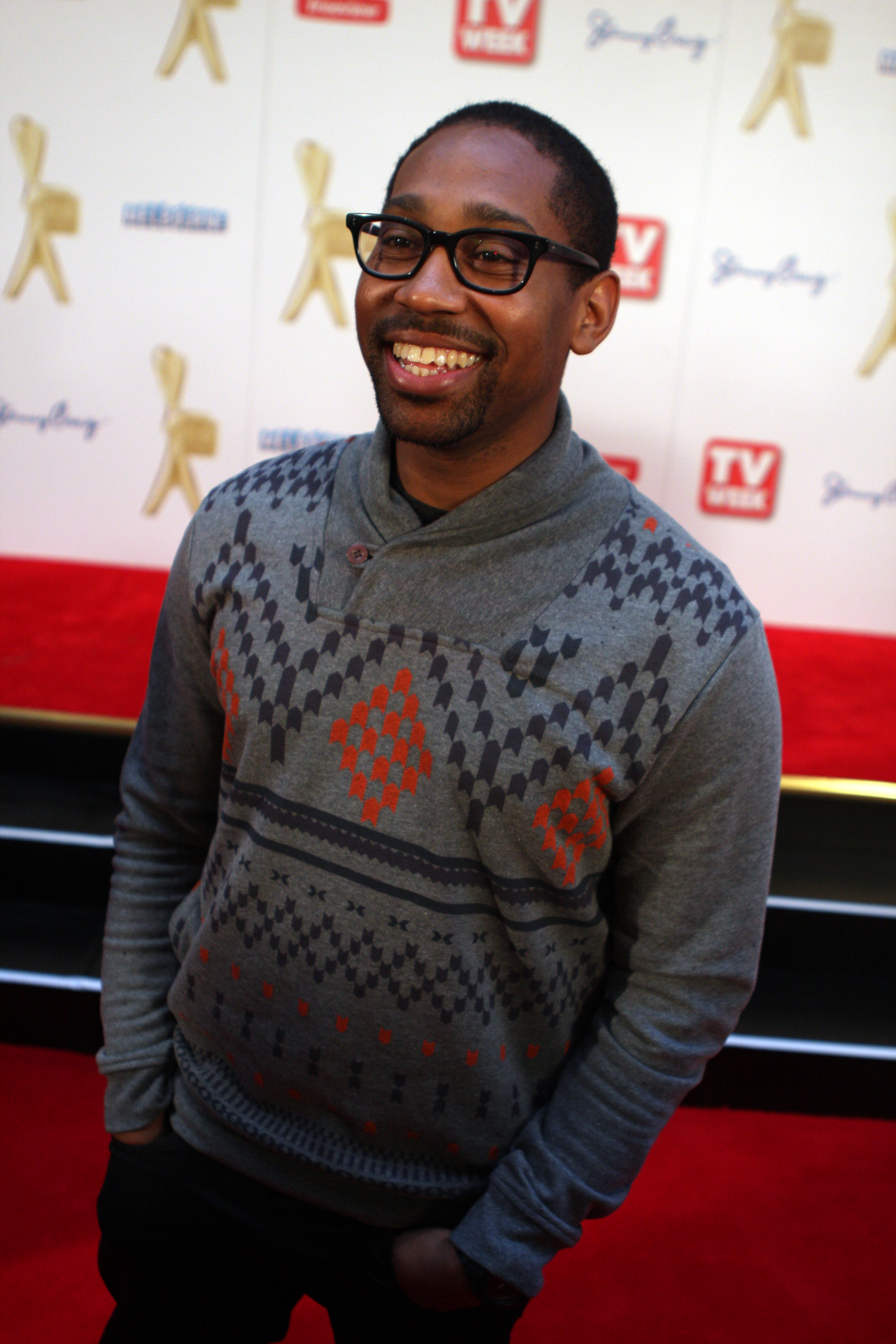
- Studio albums: 10
- EPs: 2
- Mixtapes: 1
- Live albums: 5
- Remix albums: 1

American singer PJ Morton has released nine studio albums, 5 live albums, 1 mixtape, and two extended plays. He also released one project with the PJ Morton Band and one remix. He also has music with the band Maroon 5.

In 2005, Morton released his debut studio album Emotions at age 23. 5 years later, he returned with Walk Alone (2010), and three years later he returned with his most acclaimed album at the time New Orleans. It reached #194 on the Billboard 200 and #23 on the Top R&B/Hip-Hop Albums chart. He also released an EP the previous year called Following My First Mind. In 2016 he released his final EP Sticking to My Guns. In 2017, Morton hit his stride with his fourth studio album Gumbo. He followed up Gumbo with a live version and two studio albums Paul (2019) and Gospel According to PJ: From the Songbook of PJ Morton (2020). After the COVID-19 pandemic, he followed that up with albums Watch the Sun (2022) and Cape Town to Cairo (2024).

== Studio albums ==
Title	Album details	Sales	Certifications
Emotions	Released January 1, 2005; Label: 2PM Music; Formats: Vinyl, CD, Cassette, DVD, Box set	-	-
Walk Alone	Released April 6, 2010; Label: Songs of Solomon Music; Formats: CD, album	-	-
New Orleans	Released May 14, 2013; Label: Young Money Records, Cash Money Records, Republic Records; Formats: CD, album	-	-
Gumbo	Released April 14, 2017; Label: Morton Recordings; Formats: CD, Album, LP, Stereo	-	-
Christmas With PJ Morton	Released November 9, 2018; Label: Morton Recordings, Empire Records; Format: Vinyl, LP, Album, Stereo, Red Marble Vinyl	-	-
Paul	Released August 9, 2019; Label: Morton Recordings, Empire Records; Formats: Vinyl, LP, Album, Stereo	-	-
Gospel According to PJ: From the Songbook of PJ Morton	Released August 28, 2020; Label: Tyscot Records; Formats: Vinyl, LP, 45 RPM, Album	-	-
Watch the Sun	Released April 29, 2022; Label: Morton Recordings, Empire Records; Formats: Vinyl, LP, Album	-	-
Cape Town To Cairo	Released June 14, 2024; Label: Morton Recordings, Empire Records; Formats: Vinyl, LP, Album, Gat, CD, Stereo	-	-

== Live albums ==
Title	Album details	Sales	Certifications
Live from LA	Released 2008; Label: N/A; Formats: CD, Album, Live	-	-
Live Show Killer	Released 2015; Label: Morton Recordings; Formats: CD, Album, DVD, NTSC; With the Crusade	-	-
Gumbo Unplugged	Released March 9, 2018; Label: Morton Recordings; Formats: Vinyl, LP, Album, CD, Stereo	-	-
The Piano Album	Released 2020; Label: Morton Recordings; Vinyl, LP, Stereo	-	-
Watch the Sun Live: The Mansion Sessions	Released November 28, 2023; Label: Morton Recordings; Formats: Vinyl, LP, Album, Stereo, Gatefold	-	-

== Mixtapes ==
Title	Album details	Sales	Certifications
Bounce & Soul Vol. 1	Released March 25, 2016; Label: Morton Recordings; Formats: File, AAC, Album, Stereo	-	-

== Extended plays ==
Title	Album details	Sales	Certifications
Following My First Mind	Released March 26, 2012; Label: N/A	-	-
Sticking to My Guns	Released 2016	-	-
