= Global United Fellowship =

Christian denomination

- Seal of the Global United Fellowship
- Abbreviation: GUF
- Classification: Protestant
- Orientation: Inter-denominational
- Theology: Ecumenism, Seven Mountain Mandate, Charismaticism
- Polity: Episcopal
- Governance: Executive Council
- Presiding Bishop: Joel Peebles, Sr.
- Founder: Neil Ellis
- Origin: 2013
- Separated from: Full Gospel Baptist Church Fellowship
- Congregations: 1,400+
- Official website: globalunitedfellowship.org

The Global United Fellowship (GUF) is an interdenominational and predominantly African-American Christian denomination founded in 2013 by Bishop Neil Ellis. Established after resigning from the Full Gospel Baptist Church Fellowship, the GUF claims to embrace individual churches, ministries, fellowships, and pastors in its organization.

== History ==
In August 2013, Bishop Neil Ellis resigned from the Full Gospel Baptist Church Fellowship after stating he wanted "to avoid a possible division within the fellowship." Ellis was running a campaign to succeed Paul S. Morton as Full Gospel's presiding bishop. Upon resignation, Ellis and the Mount Tabor Church collectively left the Full Gospel Baptists; all Full Gospel-affiliated churches in the Bahamas also left the fellowship, including some leaders from the United States and the Turks and Caicos Islands.

After a two-day meeting, the Global United Fellowship was formed. Bahamian PM Perry Christie attended the launch of the GUF in 2013.

In July 2016, Marvin Sapp—a Gospel artist—was consecrated as a bishop within the fellowship. During his episcopal consecration, the GUF's founder served as chief celebrant with Bishop J. Delano Ellis of the Pentecostal Churches of Christ as a co-consecrator. Sapp was appointed over the Central Province of the Global United Fellowship.

In July 2019, the GUF had grown from 41 churches at its foundation to more than 1,400 churches in 42 countries. As late as 2019, Pastor Jamal Harrison Bryant of New Birth Missionary Baptist Church was a member.

In October 2023, Ellis retired as presiding bishop for the GUF. He was succeeded in office by Bishop Joel Peebles.

== Doctrine ==
The GUF believes in ecumenism, and the nuclear family. It also embraces Pentecostal and Charismatic tenets, and the Seven Mountain Mandate.
