= Neil Ellis (bishop) =

Bahamian Baptist pastor

The Most Reverend Neil C. Ellis
- Founder and Presiding Bishop-Emeritus of the Global United Fellowship
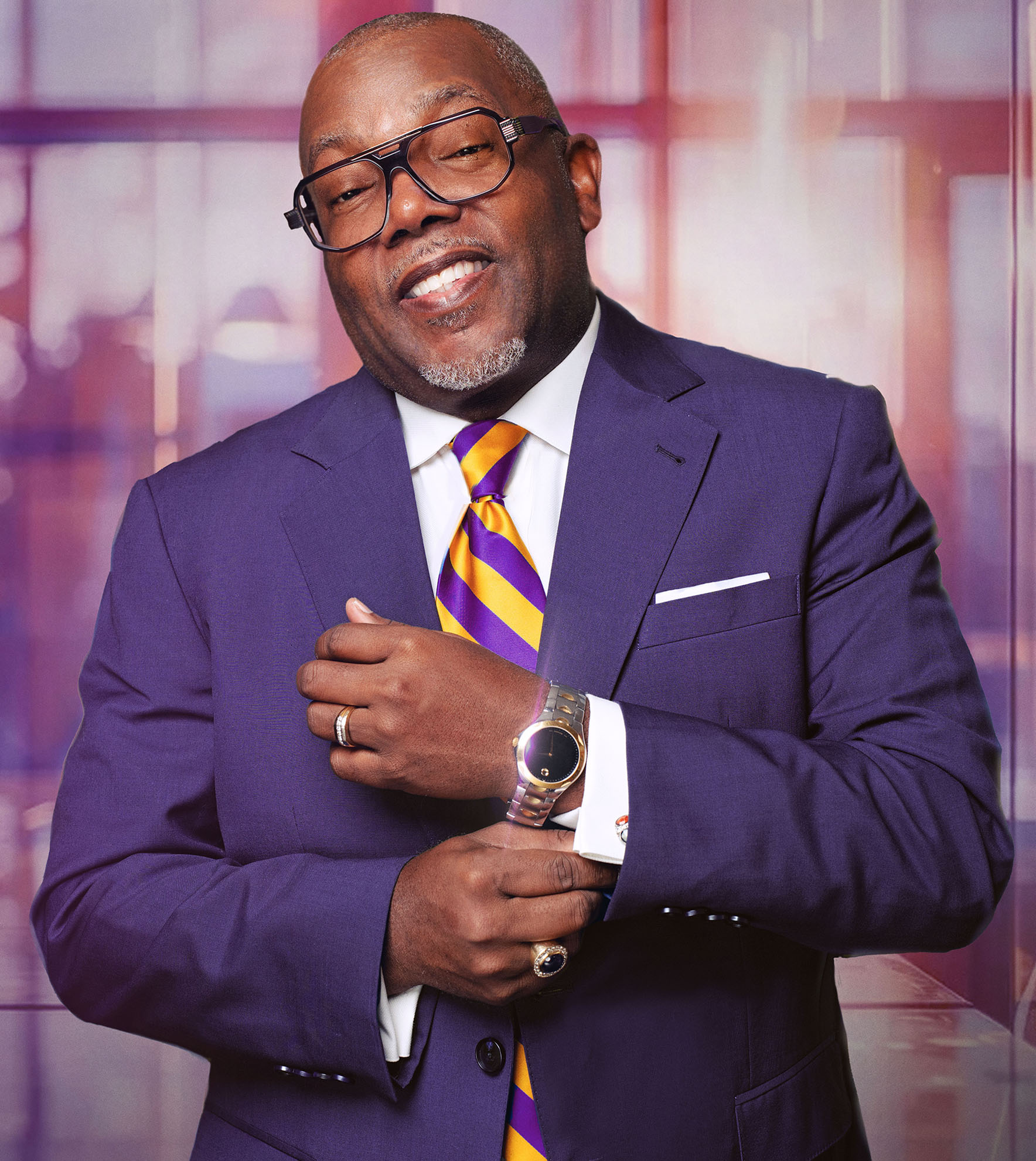
- Church: Global United Fellowship

Orders
- Consecration: 1995

Personal details
- Born: Bimini, Bahamas
- Residence: Nassau, Bahamas
- Children: 2
- Occupation: Pastor, author, speaker

Neil Ellis is a Bahamian Baptist pastor, and founder and first presiding bishop of the Global United Fellowship.

== Biography ==
In 1985, Ellis organized Mount Tabor Union Baptist Church, and by 1995, he was consecrated as a bishop within the Full Gospel Baptist Church Fellowship.

In 2013, after Bishop Paul S. Morton announced his intent to retire as the Full Gospel Baptist Church Fellowship's presiding bishop, Ellis ran a campaign to succeed him. By August 2013, Ellis resigned from the Full Gospel Baptist Church Fellowship, "to avoid a possible division within the fellowship." After resigning, his church also disaffiliated with the Full Gospel Baptists alongside all Bahamian churches within the denomination. Following a two-day meeting, Ellis founded the Global United Fellowship.

In 2015, Ellis served as chief consecrator of Marvin Sapp, whom he appointed as metropolitan bishop in 2016.

In October 2023, Ellis resigned as the presiding bishop for Global United Fellowship. He was succeeded by Bishop Joel Peebles.
