= Mount Zion Full Gospel Church =

Church in Ontario, Canada

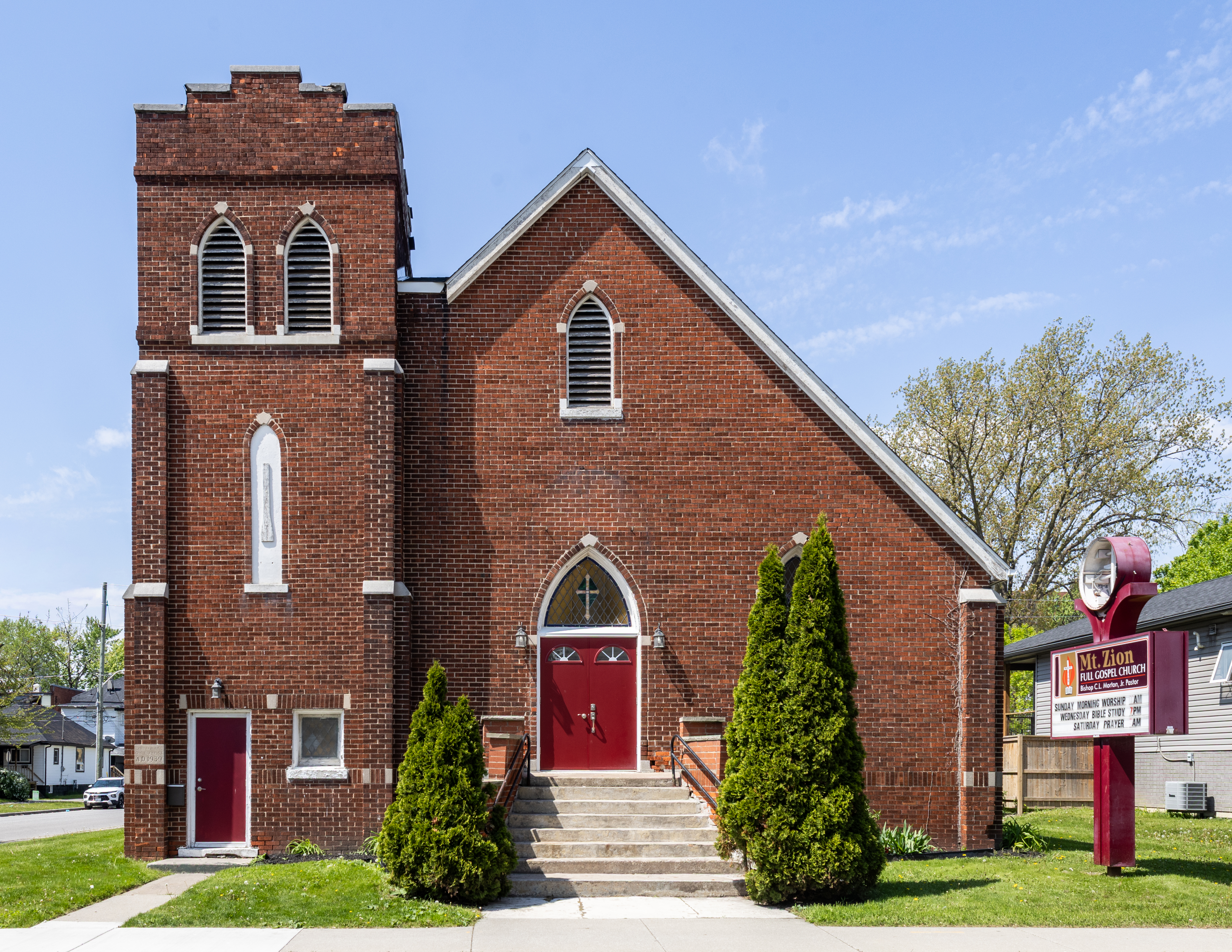
- Mount Zion Full Gospel Church in 2026
- Mount Zion Full Gospel Church
- 42°18′48″N 83°01′53″W
- Country: Canada
- Denomination: Full Gospel Baptist Church Fellowship

History
- Former name: Mount Zion Church of God in Christ
- Founded: 1939
- Founder: Clarence Leslie Morton Sr.

Architecture
- Architect: J. P. Thompson
- Architectural type: Gothic Revival
- Completed: 1939

The Mount Zion Full Gospel Church, previously the Mount Zion Church of God in Christ, is a historically Black church in Windsor, Ontario. The first building of Church of God in Christ established in Canada, it was constructed by its congregation based on a design by J. P. Thompson and completed in 1939. The church was led by Clarence Leslie Morton Sr. until his death in 1962, at which time leadership was assumed by his son Clarence Leslie Morton Jr. A modest building in the Gothic Revival style, Mount Zion was designated under the Ontario Heritage Act in 2004.

== Description ==
Mount Zion is located at 795 McDougall Street in Windsor, Ontario, Canada. It is a modest building in the Gothic Revival style, with its exterior covered in red brick and pressed stone trim. The sanctuary measures 14 by 13 metres (47 ft × 42 ft), while the tower rises three storeys and concludes with a stepped parapet.

Access to the main church building is through a doorway that sits atop a small porch, which is connected to the sidewalk below with eight steps. Another doorway provides access to the tower. Windows vary in design. Some are rectangular in shape, with diamond-shaped bevelled glass. Others are arched stained glass windows. Some of the latter have louvres of wood, and most are ornamented with keystones and voussoirs of pressed stone. Two windows have red Stars of David with blue glass borders.

== History ==
The Church of God in Christ was established in the United States by Charles Harrison Mason in 1897 as a denomination of Pentecostalism. It expanded into Canada through the efforts of Clarence Leslie Morton Sr., who in his lifetime led six churches in the United States. Morton began his ministry in Windsor in the early 1920s, first in a rented hall and later on the second storey of a machine shop. In 1936, he began hosting twice-weekly ministries on the radio, including on the local radio station CKLW. This drew more parishioners to the city.

As the congregation grew, members began collecting the funds necessary to establish their own church. They commissioned the architect J. P. Thompson for the design, which they built themselves under the guidance of contractor Louis Milburn. This included excavating the basement with a team of horses. Completed in 1939, Mount Zion was the first Church of God in Christ church to be built in Canada. Morton went on to establish another four churches in Canada, including the Triedstone Church in Chatham in 1948, as well as churches in Harrow, Buxton, and Amherstburg.

Through the 1950s, the Mount Zion congregation practiced river baptism, with Morton immersing participants in the Detroit River at the end of Campbell Avenue. This drew tourists from as far afield as Indiana, who lined the riverbanks to witness the baptisms. After the baptisms had concluded, Morton would lead a service at the church, which would be followed by a barbeque and party. In 1955, Morton established the Greater Mount Zion Tabernacle in Detroit, Michigan, after which membership declined in Windsor.

After Morton's death in 1962, leadership of the church was taken over by Morton's son, Clarence Jr. He also assumed leadership of the Mount Zion Tabernacle. Then twenty years old, Morton Jr. became one of the youngest bishops in the United States. In 1966, Morton began broadcasting his sermons from the Detroit-based WGPR. Historically a Black congregation, over time, the congregation of Mount Zion became multi-racial. The congregation also become part of the Full Gospel Baptist Church Fellowship.

In 2004, Mount Zion was designated under the Ontario Heritage Act by the City of Windsor through By-law 132-2004. In 2010, Mount Zion was closed for fears that the roof and a wall could collapse. For repairs, an estimated C$100,000 to C$150,000 was required. The church later reopened. Morton Jr. died in April 2020, during the COVID-19 pandemic. He had handled his ministry through February of that year, attending Mount Zion twice a week. In 2023, Mount Zion was included in the McDougall Street Corridor, an internet-based walking tour highlighting the street's role in local Black history. It is one of five churches included in the route, which also includes British Methodist Episcopal Church, the First Baptist Church, the Tanner African Methodist Episcopal Church, and Harrison Memorial Church.

== Works cited ==
- Battagello, Dave (15 April 2020). "Longtime Mt. Zion Pastor Remembered as 'Ray of Light' in Local Faith Community". The Windsor Star. Archived from the original on 10 May 2026.
- "By-Law 132-2004". City of Windsor. 7 June 2004. Archived from the original on 10 May 2026.
- "Historic Windsor Church Needs Repair". CBC. 17 November 2010. Archived from the original on 9 May 2026.
- Key, Willow (2023). "Pillars of Society: Religious Institutions". We Were Here: Documenting Windsor's McDougall Street Corridor. University of Windsor. Archived from the original on 10 May 2026.
- "Local 'Icon' in Faith Community, C. L. Morton Jr., Dies". CBC. 14 April 2020. Archived from the original on 10 May 2026.
- MacLeod, Brian (14 April 2023). "McDougall Street Corridor Walking Tour Highlights City's Black History". The Windsor Star – via ProQuest.
- "Mt. Zion Church of God in Christ". Canada's Historic Places. Parks Canada. Archived from the original on 5 April 2026.
- Shreve, Ellwood (18 October 2008). "East Side Church Offers Refuge". Chatham Daily News. p. 10 – via ProQuest.
- Spelbring, Meredith (20 April 2020). "Bishop C.L. Morton Dies: Preacher will Be Missed All Over the World". Detroit Free Press. Archived from the original on 10 May 2026.
