= John Richard Bryant =

American bishop (born 1943)

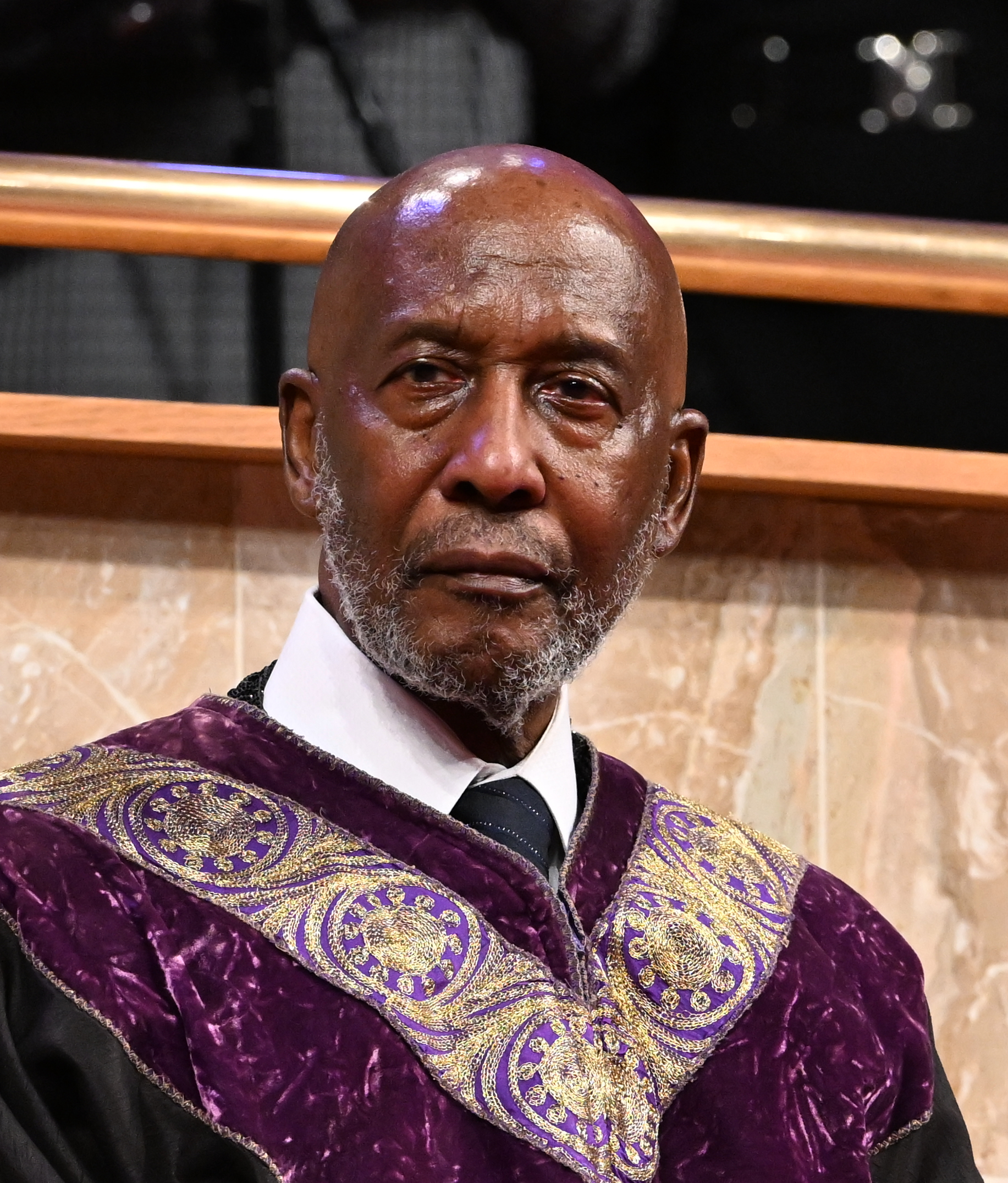
Bryant in 2026

John Richard Bryant (born June 8, 1943) a retired American prelate who was the former Senior Bishop and Presiding Prelate of the Fourth Episcopal District of the African Methodist Episcopal Church.

== Biography ==
Bryant is the son of the late Bishop Harrison James and Edith Holland Bryant. He was elected and consecrated the 106th Bishop of the African Methodist Episcopal Church at the 1988 General Conference in Fort Worth, Texas.

He earned his B.A. degree in 1965 at Morgan State University, his M.Th. degree in 1970 at the Boston University School of Theology, and his D.Min. degree at the Colgate Rochester Divinity School in 1975.

Bryant also holds several Honorary Doctorates from Paul Quinn College, Wilberforce University, Payne Theological Seminary and Virginia Seminary. He received the Outstanding Alumnus Award from both Boston University School of Theology and Morgan State University. He was inducted into the Hall of Fame of his high school, Baltimore City College.

Bishop Bryant is the father of Dr. Jamal Harrison Bryant, Senior Pastor of New Birth Missionary Baptist Church in Dekalb County, Georgia near Lithonia and Dr. Thema Simone Bryant-Davis. Jamal's ex-wife Gizelle Bryant is a star on the reality series The Real Housewives of Potomac.

== Connections to Pentecostalism ==
Bishop Bryant and his wife, Reverend Dr. Cecilia Williams-Bryant, garnered a reputation for turning St. Paul A.M.E. Church in Cambridge, Massachusetts into what people called a "rocking church" because of their support of Pentecostal religious practices.

When assigned to Bethel A.M.E. Church in Baltimore, Maryland in 1975, the congregation grew to over several thousand members. Again, the Bryants brought to Bethel a sense of Pentecostalism and 14 percent of the congregation reported that they regularly practiced glossalalia or "speaking in tongues" and 59 percent reported that they had the gifts of prophecy and/or divine healing.

Because of all this, Bishop Bryant is considered the father of Neo-Pentecostalism.
