= Grammy Award for Best R&B Album =

Award

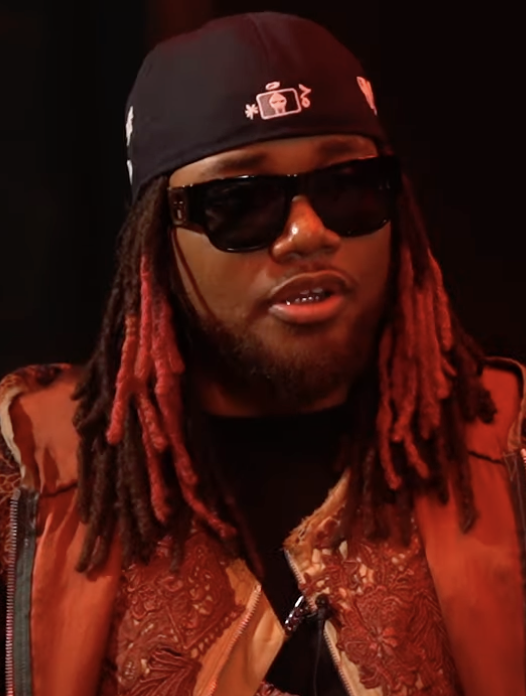
- Mutt by Leon Thomas is the most recent recipient
- Awarded for: Quality R&B music albums
- Country: United States
- Presented by: National Academy of Recording Arts and Sciences
- First award: 1995
- Currently held by: Leon Thomas, Mutt (2026)
- Website: grammy.com

The Grammy Award for Best R&B Album is an honor presented at the Grammy Awards, a ceremony that was established in 1958 and originally called the Gramophone Awards, to recording artists for quality works on albums in the R&B music genre. Honors in several categories are presented at the ceremony annually by The Recording Academy of the United States to "honor artistic achievement, technical proficiency and overall excellence in the recording industry, without regard to album sales or chart position".

According to the category description guide for the 54th Grammy Awards, the award is reserved for albums "containing at least 51% playing time of newly recorded contemporary R&B vocal tracks" which may also "incorporate production elements found in rap music".

From 2003 to 2011, a separate category was formed, the Best Contemporary R&B Album, meant for R&B albums that had modern hip-hop stylings to them, while more traditional and less electronic-styled R&B music still fell under the Best R&B Album category. After the 2011 Grammy season, the Best Contemporary R&B Album category was discontinued and recordings that previously fell under this category were shifted back to the Best R&B Album category. This was part of a major overhaul of the Grammy Award categories. In 2013, a sister category titled Best Progressive R&B Album, then titled Best Urban Contemporary Album was debuted.

The award goes to the artist, producer and engineer/mixer, provided they are credited with at least 50% of playing time on the album. The lead performing artist is the only one who receives the official nomination and they receive a statuette on the night of the telecast. The producer and engineer/mixer, however, are determined after the telecast and will have to wait before they receive their statuette. This process may take up to several months - the winning producers and engineers/mixers of the 2024 Grammy winner Chris Brown's 11:11 (Deluxe) still remain undetermined as of February 2026. A producer or engineer who is responsible for less than 50% of playing time, as well as the mastering engineer, can apply for a Winners Certificate. Before 2001, only the performing artist received a nomination and/or an award.

Alicia Keys and John Legend are the biggest recipients in this category with three wins. TLC, D'Angelo, Robert Glasper, and Chris Brown have won the award twice. Mary J. Blige holds the record for the most nominations, with six in total. In 2015, Norwegian singer Bern/hoft became the first non-American artist to be nominated.

== Recipients ==
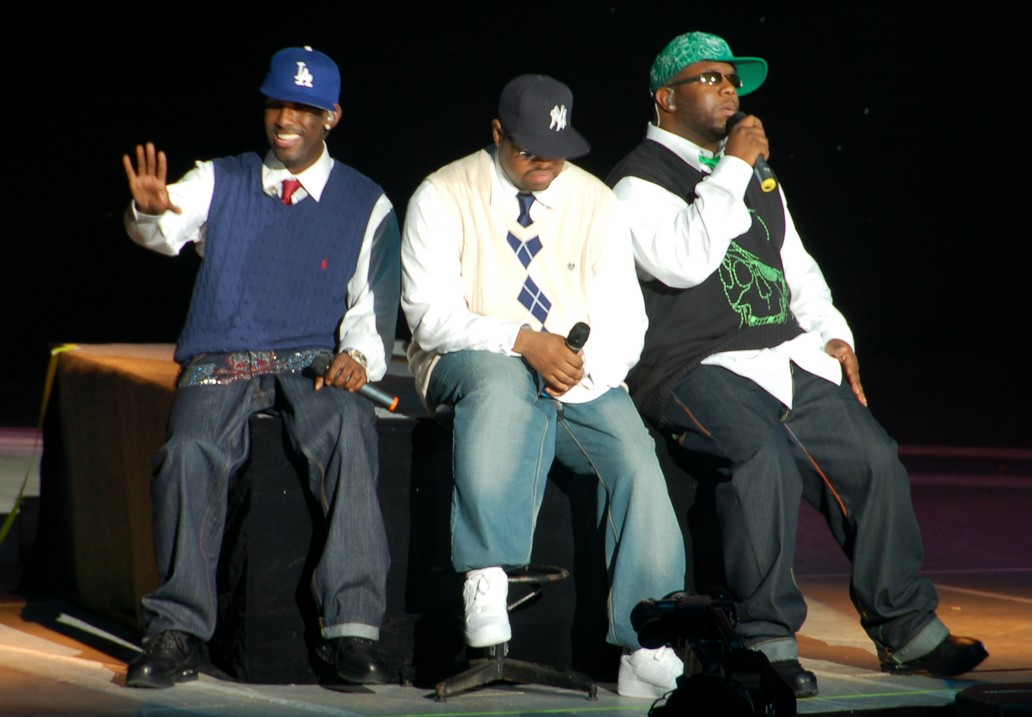
Boyz II Men were the first recipients of the Grammy Award for Best R&B Album in 1995.

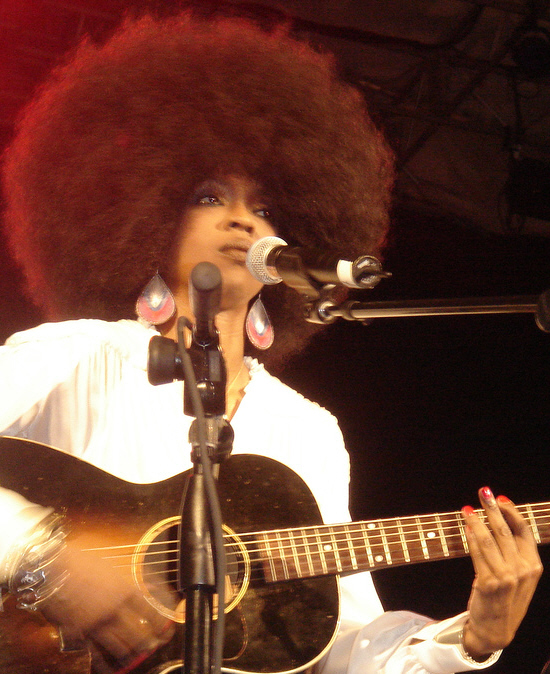
For her work on The Miseducation of Lauryn Hill, Lauryn Hill won the Grammy Award for Best R&B Album as well as Album of the Year.

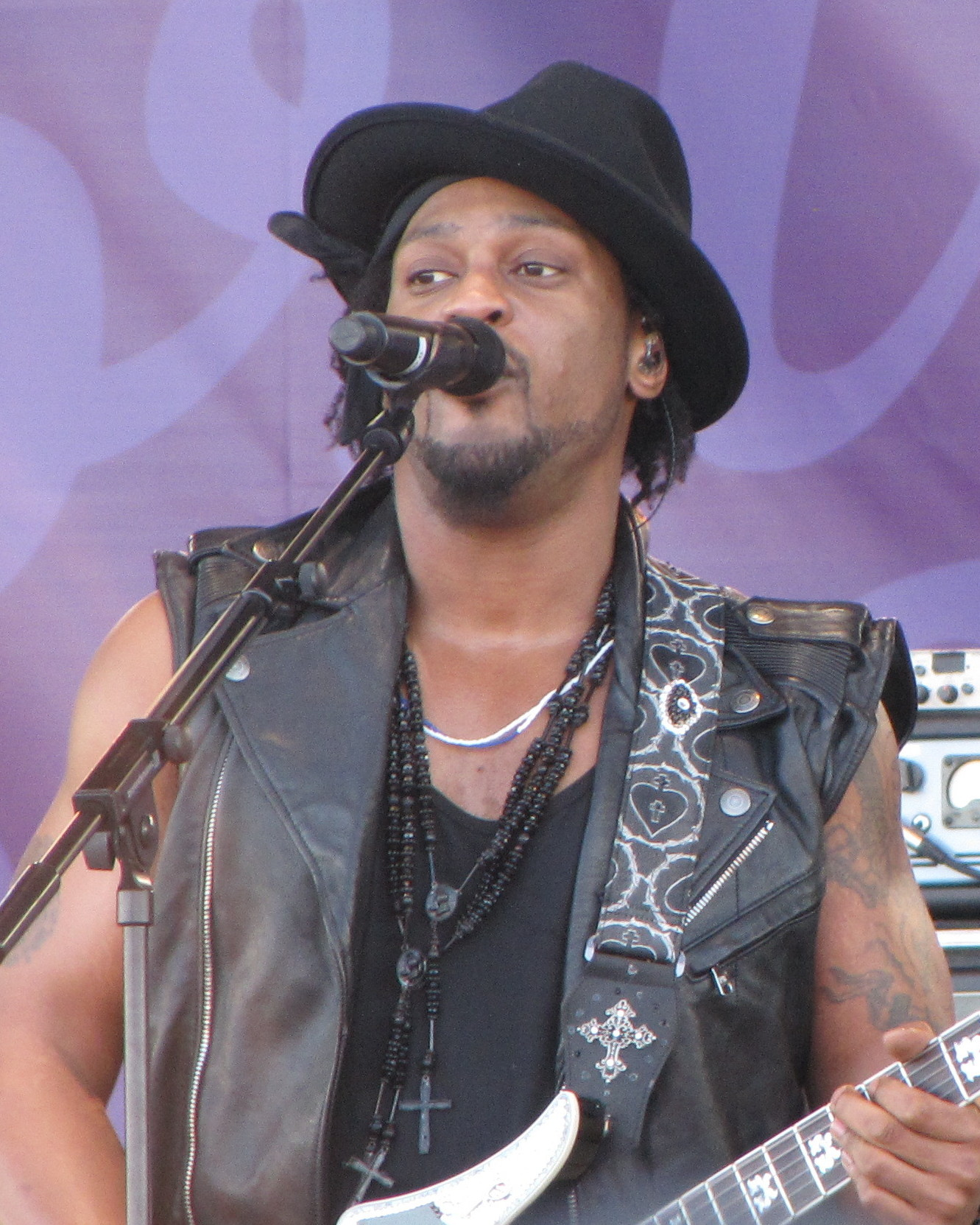
Two-time recipient D'Angelo.

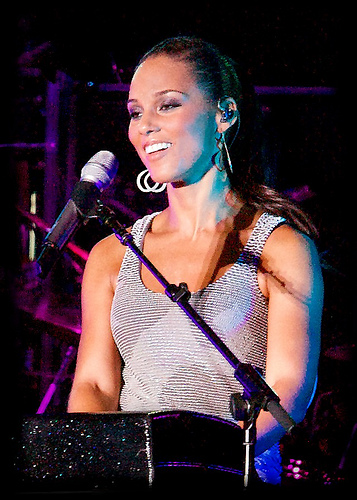
2002, 2005 and 2014 award winner, Alicia Keys

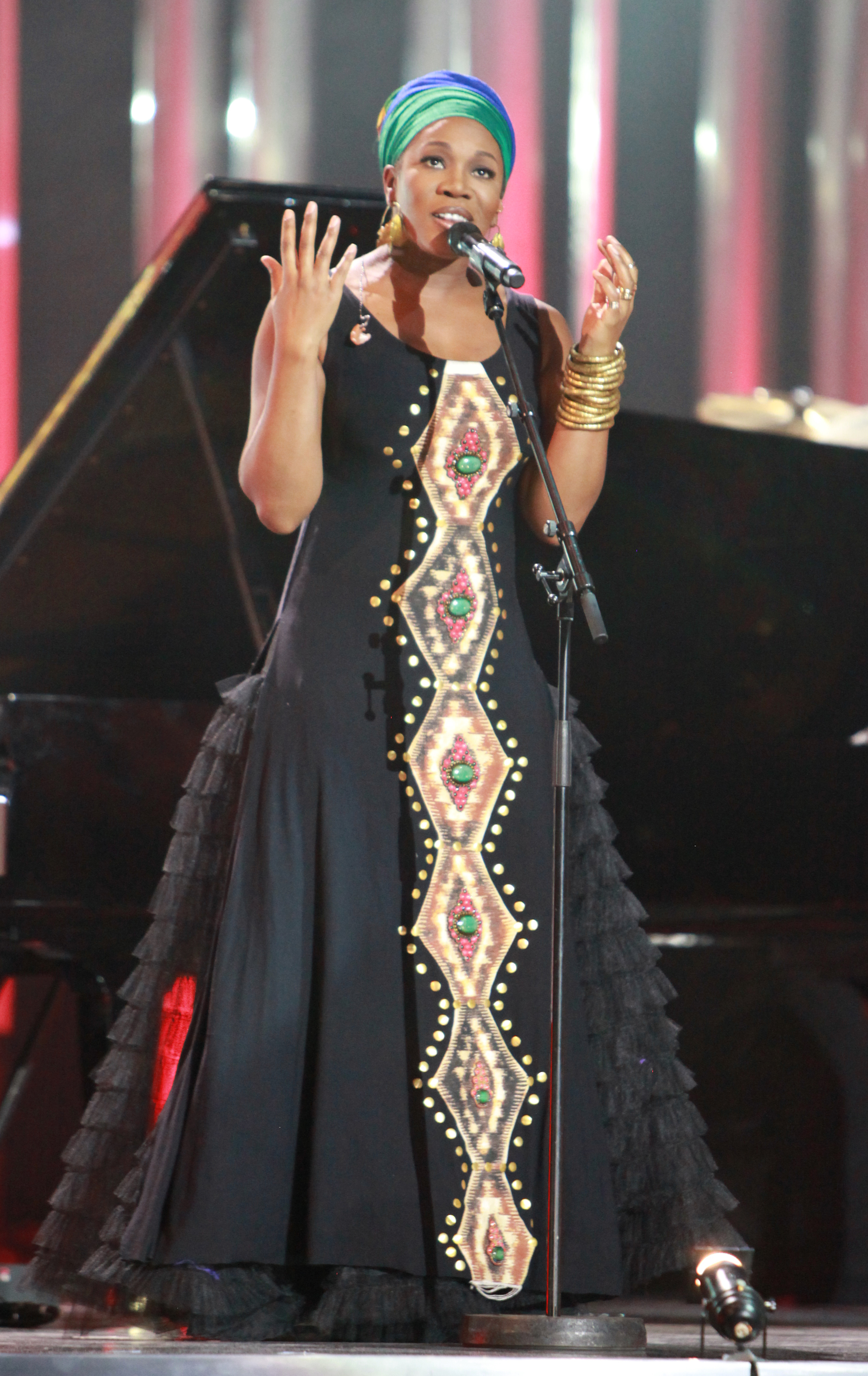
Three-time nominee and 2003 award winner India.Arie

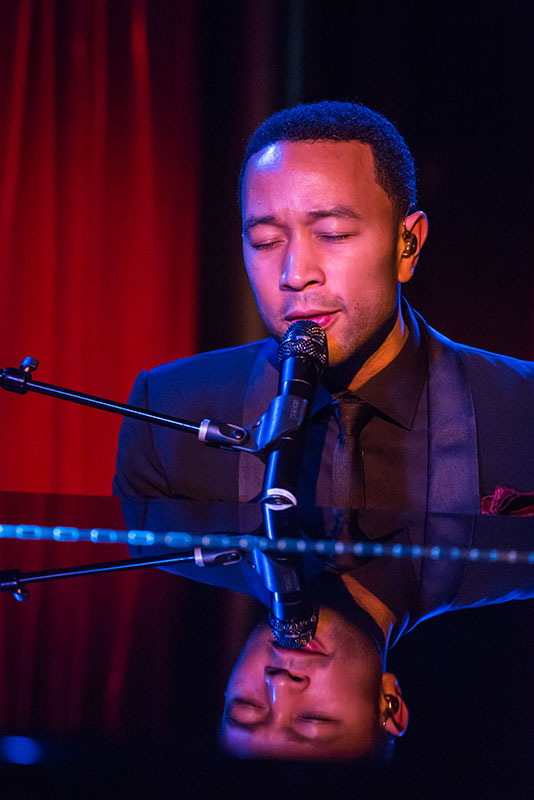
To date, John Legend has earned eleven Grammy Awards for his work, including three for Best R&B album.

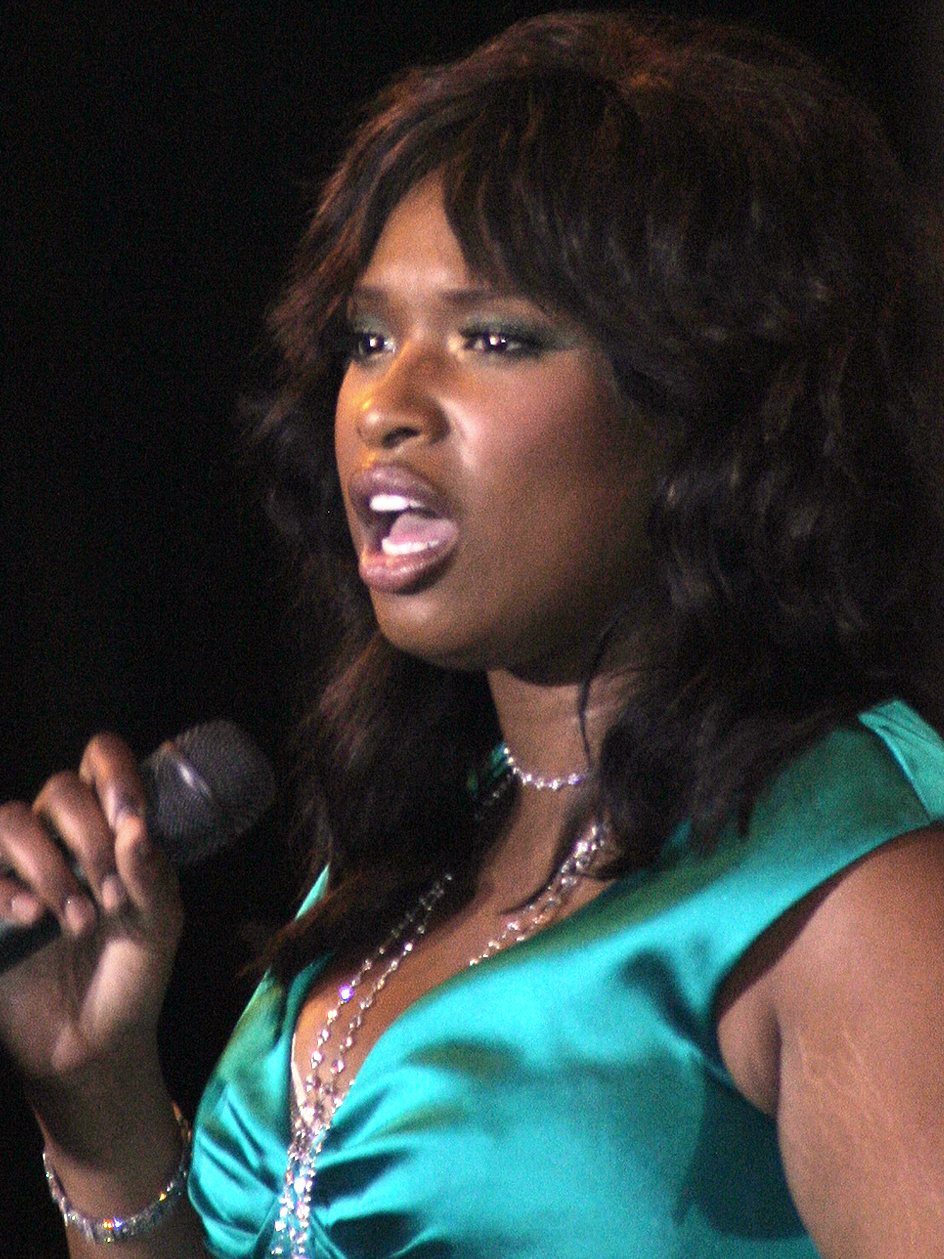
2009 award winner Jennifer Hudson

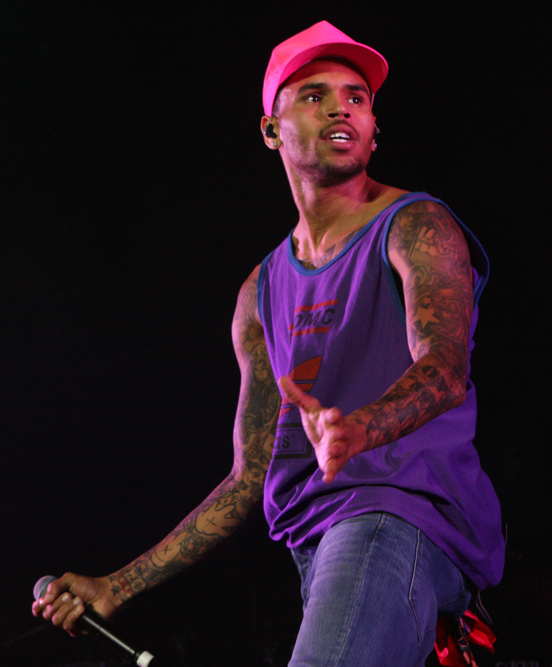
2012 and 2025 award winner Chris Brown

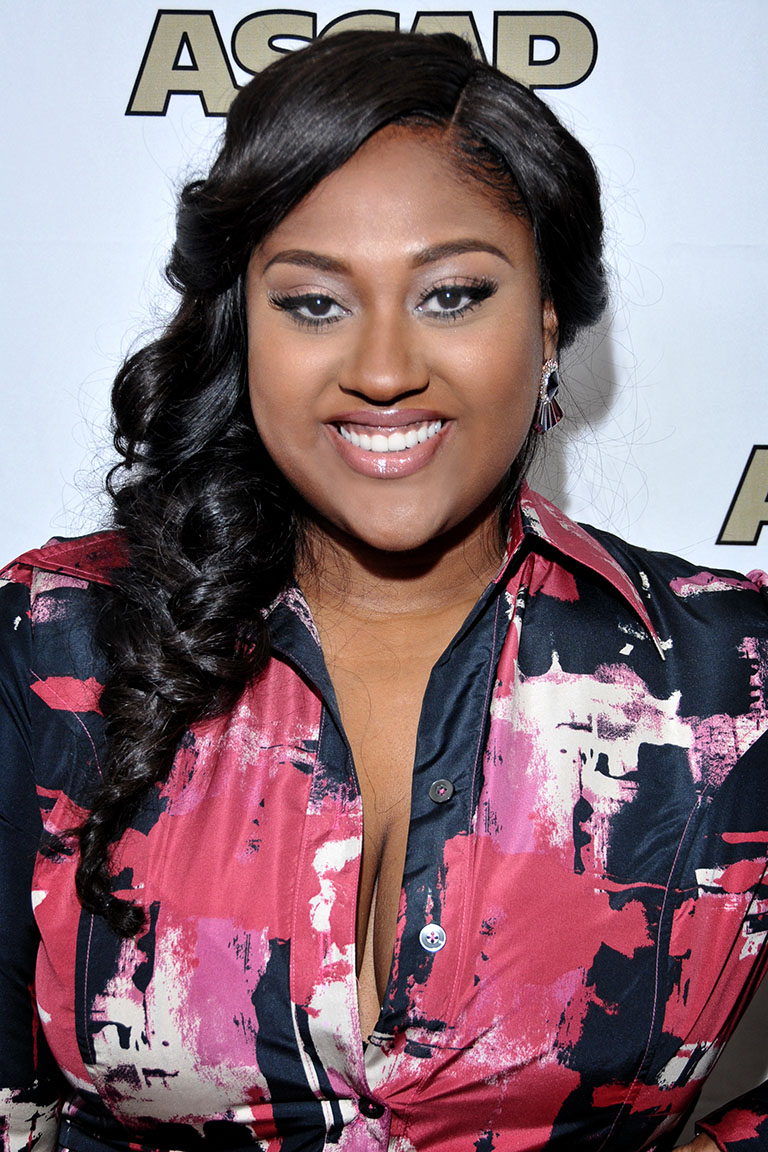
2022 award winner Jazmine Sullivan

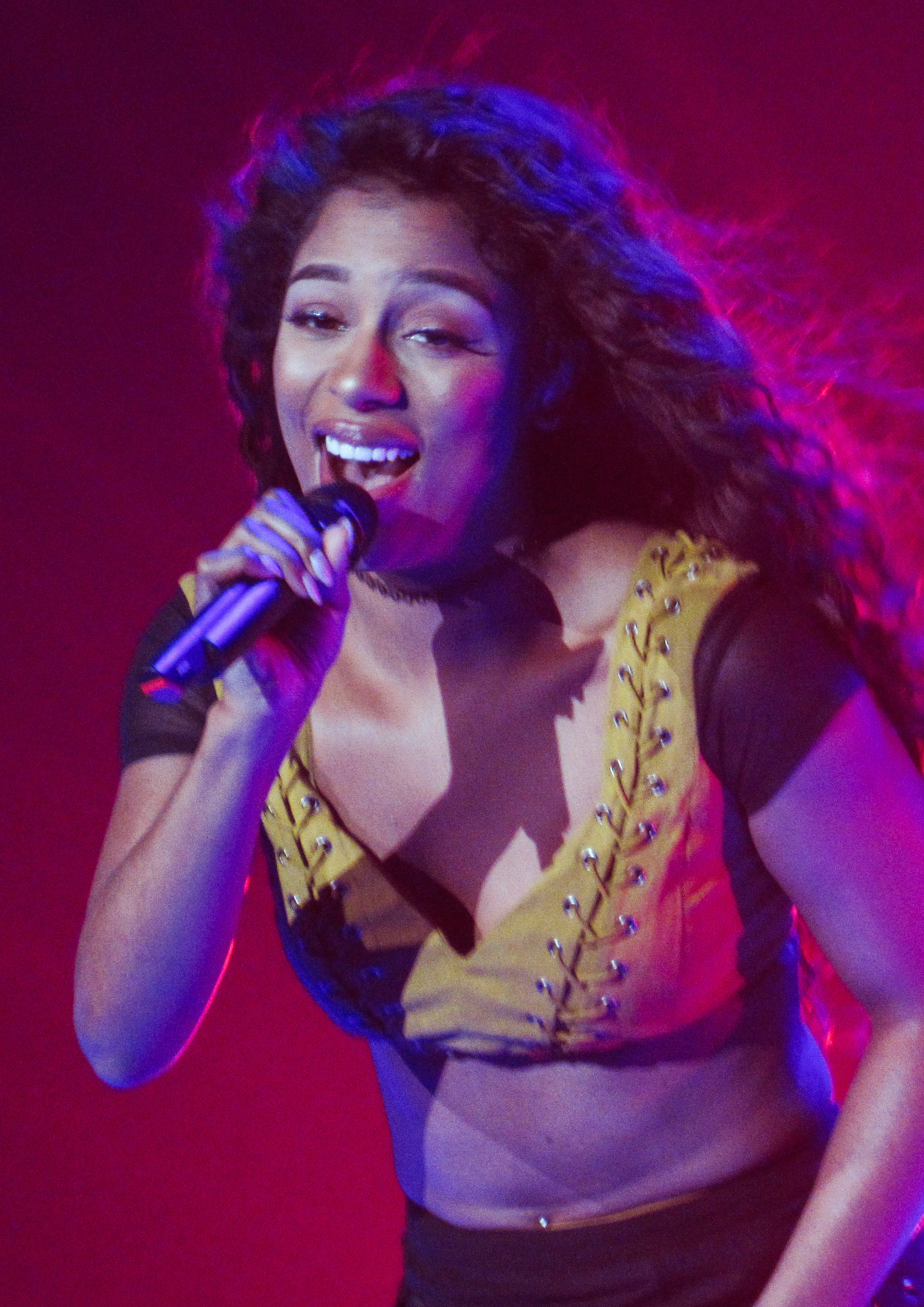
2024 award winner Victoria Monet

=== 1990s ===
Year^{[I]}	Work	Performing artist(s)
1995	II	Boyz II Men
1995	I'm Ready	Tevin Campbell
1995	Just for You	Gladys Knight
1995	Plantation Lullabies	Me'Shell NdegéOcello
1995	Rhythm of Love	Anita Baker
1995	Songs	Luther Vandross
1996	CrazySexyCool	TLC
1996	Brown Sugar	D'Angelo
1996	The Gold Experience	Prince
1996	The Icon Is Love	Barry White
1996	My Life	Mary J. Blige
1997	Words	Tony Rich
1997	Maxwell's Urban Hang Suite	Maxwell
1997	Moving On	Oleta Adams
1997	New World Order	Curtis Mayfield
1997	Peace Beyond Passion	Me'Shell NdegéOcello
1998	Baduizm	Erykah Badu
1998	The Day	Babyface
1998	Evolution	Boyz II Men
1998	Flame	Patti LaBelle
1998	The Preacher's Wife: Original Soundtrack Album	Whitney Houston
1998	Share My World	Mary J. Blige
1999	The Miseducation of Lauryn Hill	Lauryn Hill
1999	Embrya	Maxwell
1999	Live	Erykah Badu
1999	Never Say Never	Brandy
1999	A Rose Is Still a Rose	Aretha Franklin

=== 2000s ===
Year^{[I]}	Work	Performing artist(s)
2000	FanMail	TLC
2000	Back at One	Brian McKnight
2000	Mary	Mary J. Blige
2000	My Love Is Your Love	Whitney Houston
2000	R.	R. Kelly
2001	Voodoo	D'Angelo
2001	Nathan Michael Shawn Wanya	Boyz II Men
2001	The Heat	Toni Braxton
2001	My Name Is Joe	Joe
2001	Unleash the Dragon	Sisqó
2001	Who Is Jill Scott? Words and Sounds Vol. 1	Jill Scott
2002	Songs in A Minor	Alicia Keys
2002	Aaliyah	Aaliyah
2002	Acoustic Soul	India.Arie
2002	No More Drama	Mary J. Blige
2002	Survivor	Destiny's Child
2003	Voyage to India	India.Arie
2003	Better Days	Joe
2003	Instant Vintage	Raphael Saadiq
2003	Juslisen	Musiq
2003	The Way I Feel	Remy Shand
2004	Dance with My Father	Luther Vandross
2004	Bittersweet	Blu Cantrell
2004	Body Kiss	The Isley Brothers
2004	So Damn Happy	Aretha Franklin
2004	Worldwide Underground	Erykah Badu
2005	The Diary of Alicia Keys	Alicia Keys
2005	Beautifully Human: Words and Sounds Vol. 2	Jill Scott
2005	I Can't Stop	Al Green
2005	Musicology	Prince
2005	My Everything	Anita Baker
2006	Get Lifted	John Legend
2006	Free Yourself	Fantasia
2006	Illumination	Earth, Wind & Fire
2006	A Time to Love	Stevie Wonder
2006	Unplugged	Alicia Keys
2007	The Breakthrough	Mary J. Blige
2007	3121	Prince
2007	Coming Home	Lionel Richie
2007	Testimony: Vol. 1, Life & Relationship	India.Arie
2007	Unpredictable	Jamie Foxx
2008	Funk This	Chaka Khan
2008	Lost & Found	Ledisi
2008	Luvanmusiq	Musiq Soulchild
2008	The Real Thing: Words and Sounds Vol. 3	Jill Scott
2008	Sex, Love & Pain	Tank
2009	Jennifer Hudson	Jennifer Hudson
2009	Lay It Down	Al Green
2009	Love & Life	Eric Benét
2009	Motown: A Journey Through Hitsville USA	Boyz II Men
2009	The Way I See It	Raphael Saadiq

=== 2010s ===
Year^{[I]}	Work	Performing artist(s)
2010	BLACKsummers'night	Maxwell
2010	The Point of It All	Anthony Hamilton
2010	Testimony: Vol. 2, Love & Politics	India.Arie
2010	Turn Me Loose	Ledisi
2010	Uncle Charlie	Charlie Wilson
2011	Wake Up!	John Legend and The Roots
2011	Another Round	Jaheim
2011	Back to Me	Fantasia
2011	The Love & War MasterPeace	Raheem DeVaughn
2011	Still Standing	Monica
2012	F.A.M.E.	Chris Brown
2012	Kelly	Kelly Price
2012	Love Letter	R. Kelly
2012	Pieces of Me	Ledisi
2012	Second Chance	El DeBarge
2013	Black Radio	Robert Glasper Experiment
2013	Back to Love	Anthony Hamilton
2013	Beautiful Surprise	Tamia
2013	Open Invitation	Tyrese
2013	Write Me Back	R. Kelly
2014	Girl on Fire	Alicia Keys
2014	Better	Chrisette Michele
2014	Love in the Future	John Legend
2014	R&B Divas	Faith Evans
2014	Three Kings	TGT
2015	Love, Marriage & Divorce	Toni Braxton and Babyface
2015	Black Radio 2	Robert Glasper Experiment
2015	Give the People What They Want	Sharon Jones & The Dap-Kings
2015	Islander	Bernhoft
2015	Lift Your Spirit	Aloe Blacc
2016	Black Messiah	D'Angelo and The Vanguard
2016	Cheers to the Fall	Andra Day
2016	Coming Home	Leon Bridges
2016	Forever Charlie	Charlie Wilson
2016	Reality Show	Jazmine Sullivan
2017	Lalah Hathaway Live	Lalah Hathaway
2017	Healing Season	Mint Condition
2017	In My Mind	BJ the Chicago Kid
2017	Smoove Jones	Mýa
2017	Velvet Portraits	Terrace Martin
2018	24K Magic	Bruno Mars
2018	Feel the Real	Musiq Soulchild
2018	Freudian	Daniel Caesar
2018	Gumbo	PJ Morton
2018	Let Love Rule	Ledisi
2019	H.E.R.	H.E.R.
2019	Good Thing	Leon Bridges
2019	Gumbo Unplugged (Live)	PJ Morton
2019	Honestly	Lalah Hathaway
2019	Sex & Cigarettes	Toni Braxton

=== 2020s ===
Year^{[I]}	Work	Performing artist(s)
2020	Ventura	Anderson .Paak
2020	1123	BJ the Chicago Kid
2020	Ella Mai	Ella Mai
2020	Painted	Lucky Daye
2020	Paul	PJ Morton
2021	Bigger Love	John Legend
2021	All Rise	Gregory Porter
2021	Happy 2 Be Here	Ant Clemons
2021	Take Time	Giveon
2021	To Feel Love/d	Luke James
2022	Heaux Tales	Jazmine Sullivan
2022	Back of My Mind	H.E.R.
2022	Gold-Diggers Sound	Leon Bridges
2022	Temporary Highs in the Violet Skies	Snoh Aalegra
2022	We Are	Jon Batiste
2023	Black Radio III	Robert Glasper
2023	Breezy (Deluxe)	Chris Brown
2023	Candydrip	Lucky Daye
2023	Good Morning Gorgeous (Deluxe)	Mary J. Blige
2023	Watch the Sun	PJ Morton
2024	Jaguar II	Victoria Monét
2024	Clear 2: Soft Life EP	Summer Walker
2024	Girls Night Out	Babyface
2024	Special Occasion	Emily King
2024	What I Didn't Tell You (Deluxe)	Coco Jones
2025	11:11 (Deluxe)	Chris Brown
2025	Algorithm	Lucky Daye
2025	Coming Home	Usher
2025	Revenge	Muni Long
2025	Vantablack	Lalah Hathaway
2026	Mutt	Leon Thomas
2026	Beloved	Giveon
2026	The Crown	Ledisi
2026	Escape Room	Teyana Taylor
2026	Why Not More?	Coco Jones
2027	Brown (The Chocolate Edition)	Chris Brown
2027	Kehlani	Kehlani
2027	Saturday Night	PJ Morton
2027	To Whom This May Concern	Jill Scott
2027	When the City Sleeps	Alex Isley

^{^[I]} Each year is linked to the article about the Grammy Awards held that year.

== Artists with multiple wins ==
3 wins

- Alicia Keys
- John Legend

2 wins

- TLC
- D'Angelo
- Robert Glasper
- Chris Brown

== Artists with multiple nominations ==
6 nominations

- Mary J. Blige

5 nominations

- Ledisi
- PJ Morton

4 nominations

- Boyz II Men
- India.Arie
- Alicia Keys
- Chris Brown
- Jill Scott

3 nominations

- D'Angelo
- Babyface
- Erykah Badu
- Toni Braxton
- Leon Bridges
- Robert Glasper
- Lalah Hathaway
- R. Kelly
- John Legend
- Lucky Daye
- Maxwell
- Musiq Soulchild
- Prince

2 nominations

- Anita Baker
- BJ the Chicago Kid
- Fantasia
- Aretha Franklin
- Giveon
- Al Green
- H.E.R.
- Anthony Hamilton
- Whitney Houston
- Joe
- Coco Jones
- Me'Shell NdegéOcello
- Raphael Saadiq
- Jazmine Sullivan
- TLC
- Luther Vandross
- Charlie Wilson

== See also ==
- List of Grammy Award categories
- List of R&B musicians
- Top R&B/Hip-Hop Albums
