= Watch the Sun =

Studio album by PJ Morton
- Released: April 29, 2022
- Recorded: 2020–2022
- Studio: Studio in the Country (Bogalusa, Louisiana)
- Genre: R&B
- Length: 37:00
- Label: Morton
- Producer: PJ Morton

PJ Morton chronology
Gospel According to PJ: From the Songbook of PJ Morton (2020)	Watch the Sun (2022)	Cape Town to Cairo (2024)

Watch the Sun is the eighth studio album by American singer PJ Morton. It was released on April 29, 2022, through Morton and EMPIRE Records.

Watch the Sun is regarded as the Magnum Opus of Morton's career, and features many collaborations with gospel, R&B, and hip-hop artists.

== Background ==
In 2020, Morton released his first and only gospel album, Gospel According to PJ: From the Songbook of PJ Morton, and afterward, he moved to Bogalusa, Louisiana to record this album. He got a residence at the studio. He and his collaborators worked around the clock to complete this album.

Morton said that this album was really personal for him, stating on Zoom:

I just had to go a little deeper and get under another layer and really give that vulnerability.

— PJ Morton

He also had many voice notes from early 2020 that he used for this album.

== Composition ==
The album is very R&B and soul-influenced, with songs like 'Be Like Water" and "Lil Too Heavy" having heavy influences. He also collaborated with Stevie Wonder a major influence to the artist. He also would collaborate with fellow R&B artists such as Alex Isley and Susan Carol.

== Release ==
Morton announced Watch the Sun on his Facebook account on March 2, 2022, and it was released on April 29, 2022, through Morton Records on LP, Album, CD, and Stereo.

== Charting singles ==
Morton had one song "Please Don't Walk Away" reach the R&B/Hip-Hop Airplay chart at No. 35. Two songs from the album entered the Adult R&B Airplay chart (the aforementioned title at No. 10, and "My Peace" with JoJo and Mr. TalkBox, at No. 18).

== Track listing ==
All tracks are written by PJ Morton.

No.	Title	Featuring	Length
1.	"Love's Disease (Just Can't Get Enough)"		2:58
2.	"Biggest Mistake"		3:06
3.	"Please Don't Walk Away"		3:52
4.	"Watch the Sun"	Chronixx	2:55
5.	"My Peace"	JoJo, Mr. TalkBox	3:48
6.	"Be Like Water"	Stevie Wonder, Nas	3:18
7.	"So Lonely"		3:35
8.	"Still Believe"	Jill Scott, Alex Isley	3:41
9.	"Lil' Too Heavy"		2:51
10.	"On My Way"	El DeBarge	2:22
11.	"The Better Benediction"	Zacardi Cortez, Darrel Walls, Samoht, Gene Moore, Tim Rogers	5:24
Total length:			37 minutes

== Charts ==
Chart (2022)	Peak position
US Top Current Album Sales (Billboard)	56

== Grammy nominations ==
List of awards
Year	Nominee/work	Award	Result
2023	"Please Don't Walk Away"	Best R&B Song	Nominated
2023	Watch the Sun	Best R&B Album	Nominated

== Promotion ==
Morton announced his Watch the Sun Tour a week before the album's release. It lasted from May 25 to October 1, 2023.
