= Gospel According to PJ: From the Songbook of PJ Morton =

2019 studio album by PJ Morton

Studio album by PJ Morton
- Released: August 28, 2020 (US)
- Recorded: 2020
- Studio: The Parlor studio; (New Orleans, Los Angeles)
- Genre: Gospel; R&B; soul; funk; jazz-fusion
- Length: 42:38
- Label: Morton Recordings; Empire Records
- Producer: PJ Morton (also exec.)

PJ Morton chronology
The Piano Album (2020)	Gospel According to PJ: From the Songbook of PJ Morton (2020)	Watch the Sun (2022)

Gospel According to PJ: From the Songbook of PJ Morton is the eighth self-released studio album by American singer-songwriter PJ Morton. It's Morton's first-ever gospel album. It was released on August 28, 2020, by Morton Recordings and Empire Records. Gospel According to PJ incorporates gospel styles with elements of soul music. The album is entirely produced by Morton himself and features guest appearances by Bishop Paul S. Morton, Kim Burrell, J Moss, Kirk Franklin, Jermaine Dolly, Lena Byrd Miles, Commissioned, Darrel 'MusiqCity' Walls, Zacardi Cortez, Le'Andria Johnson, Mary Mary, The Clark Sisters, Smokie Norful, Tasha Cobbs Leonard, Brian Courtney Wilson, Travis Greene and Yolanda Adams.

== Background ==
The album was first announced on August 13, 2020. Due to the COVID-19 pandemic, Gospel According to PJ was led by video-conferenced collaborations from Morton's New Orleans studio. In between the songs are three interludes capturing a conversation between PJ and his dad, discussing the journey to a moment they never thought would come. "That's my favorite part of the album," PJ confesses. "It's a story about a father and son, and my father supporting me and being there for me even though I didn't necessarily take the path that people thought I should. We still got to this album, me being who I am, and me making him proud. He supported me through all of it."

== Track listing ==
No.	Title	Writer(s)	Producer(s)	Length
1.	"Dad's Interlude: WELCOME" (feat. Bishop Paul S. Morton)	PJ Morton	PJ Morton	0:50
2.	"Don't Let Go" (feat. Kim Burrell)	PJ Morton	PJ Morton	2:34
3.	"Repay You" (feat. J Moss)	PJ Morton	PJ Morton	4:50
4.	"Gotta Have You" (feat. Kirk Franklin, Jermaine Dolly & Lena Byrd Miles)	PJ Morton	PJ Morton	3:52
5.	"Over and Over" (feat. Commissioned)	PJ Morton	PJ Morton	3:50
6.	"Dad's Interlude: ORIGIN" (feat. Bishop Paul S. Morton)	PJ Morton	PJ Morton	0:57
7.	"So In Love" (feat. Darrel 'MusiqCity' Walls & Zacardi Cortez)	PJ Morton	PJ Morton	3:30
8.	"All In His Plan" (feat. Le'Andria Johnson & Mary Mary)	PJ Morton	PJ Morton	4:30
9.	"Here He Comes Again" (feat. The Clark Sisters)	PJ Morton	PJ Morton	3:44
10.	"God Can/Let Go" (feat. Smokie Norful)	PJ Morton	PJ Morton	5:39
11.	"Dad's Interlude: IN CLOSING" (feat. Bishop Paul S. Morton)	PJ Morton	PJ Morton	1:00
12.	"Never Be The Same" (feat. Tasha Cobbs Leonard, Brian Courtney Wilson & Travis Greene)	PJ Morton	PJ Morton	3:56
13.	"Do You Believe" (feat. Yolanda Adams)	PJ Morton	PJ Morton	3:26
