= Paul (album) =

2019 studio album by PJ Morton

Studio album by PJ Morton
- Released: August 9, 2019
- Recorded: 2019
- Studios: The Parlor studio; (New Orleans, Los Angeles)
- Genres: R&B; soul; funk; jazz-fusion
- Length: 31:56
- Labels: Morton; Empire
- Producer: PJ Morton

PJ Morton chronology
Gumbo Unplugged (2018)	Paul (2019)	The Piano Album (2020)

Singles from Paul
- 1. "Say So" Released: February 14, 2019; 2. "Ready" Released: July 23, 2019; 3. "Don't Let Go" Released: October 9, 2019

Paul is the sixth and third self-released studio album by American singer-songwriter PJ Morton. It was released on August 9, 2019, by Morton Recordings and Empire Records. Paul incorporates R&B styles with elements of soul music. The album is entirely produced by Morton himself and features guest appearances by Tobe Nwigwe, Grammy award winner Jazmine Sullivan, Rapsody, JoJo and former political pundit Angela Rye.

Paul received positive reviews from most music critics and peaked at #4 on the R&B/Hip-Hop Billboard charts. "Say So" scored Morton's first top-10 single on 'Billboard''s Adult R&B Songs chart.

Paul earned Morton three Grammy nominations for Best R&B Album, Best R&B Song and Best Traditional R&B Performance at the 62nd Annual Grammy Awards.

== Background ==
The album was first announced on July 23, 2019. Paul, which follows 2017's Gumbo Unplugged, was described by Morton to be "the most honest expression of myself and my art that I've ever made". "Everybody calls me PJ, but I came into this world as Paul. That struck me as the perfect title for this album because Paul is the purest form of who I am." According to Morton, Gumbo was originally set to be his last album, but his move back to his hometown re-inspired him. "I was struggling to figure out who I wanted to be and where I could fit in as a solo artist, and it honestly left me feeling pretty defeated" he said. "Coming back to New Orleans inspired a lot of new growth and perspective, though, and it helped me realize that the best thing I could be was myself."

== Track listing ==
All tracks are written by PJ Morton, except "Yearning for Your Love", written by Oliver Scott and Ronnie Wilson.

Paul track listing
No.	Title	Length
1.	"Ready"	2:40
2.	"Practicing" (featuring Tobe Nwigwe)	2:41
3.	"Kid Again"	2:32
4.	"Yearning for Your Love"	3:29
5.	"Buy Back the Block"	2:39
6.	"Built for Love" (featuring Jazmine Sullivan)	3:25
7.	"Don't Let Go"	2:27
8.	"Don't Break My Heart" (featuring Rapsody)	4:51
9.	"Say So" (featuring JoJo)	3:33
10.	"MAGA?" (featuring Angela Rye)	3:39

== Charts ==
Chart performance for Paul
Chart (2019)	Peak position
US Heatseekers Albums (Billboard)	4
US Independent Albums (Billboard)	11
US Top Album Sales (Billboard)	66
