= PJ Morton =

American musician (born 1981)

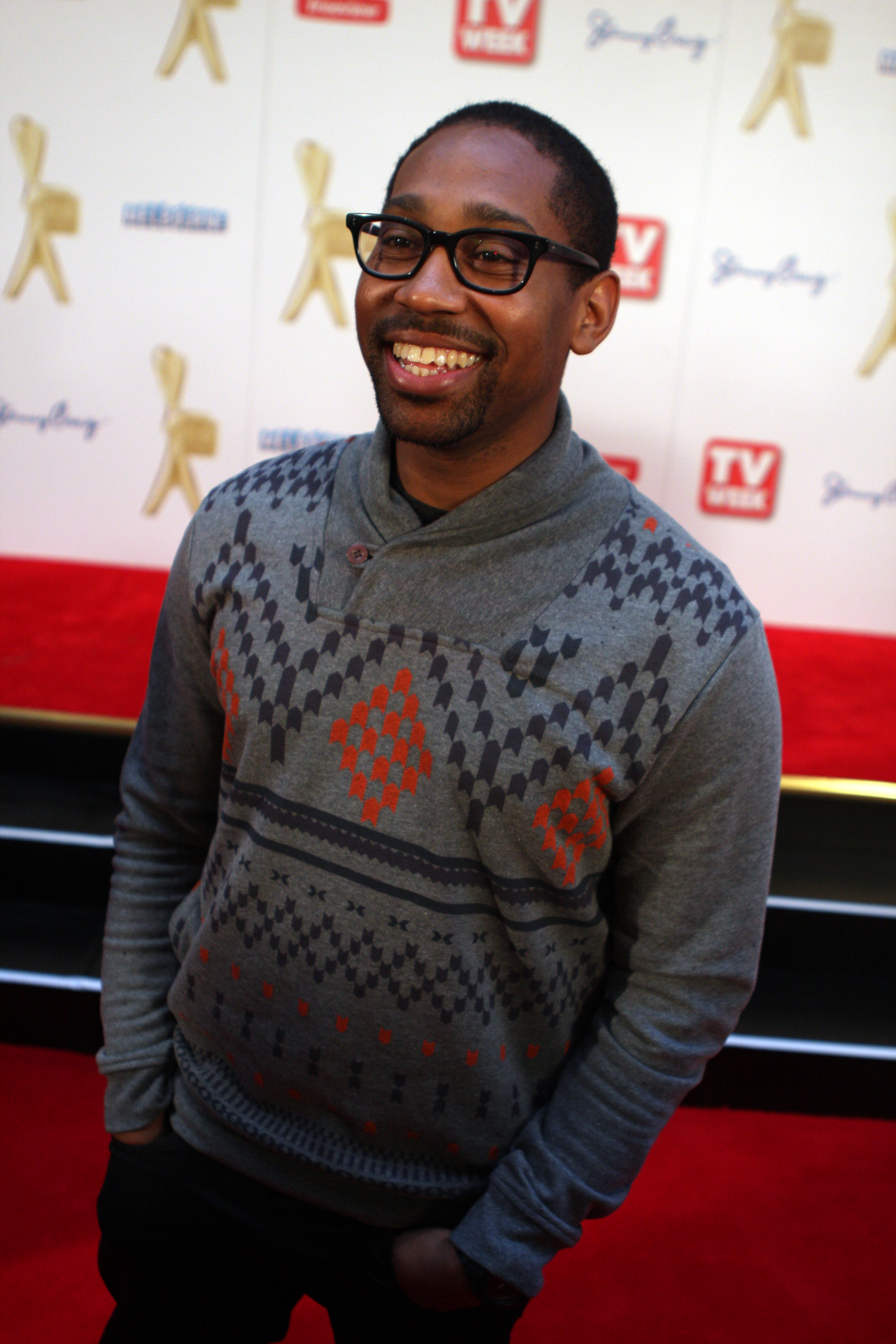
- Morton in 2011
- Born: Paul Sylvester Morton Jr. March 29, 1981 (age 45); New Orleans, Louisiana, U.S.
- Occupations: Musician; singer; songwriter; record producer
- Years active: 2004–present
- Spouse: Kortni Morton (m. 2008)
- Children: 3
- Parent: Paul S. Morton (father) Debra Morton (Mother)
- Relatives: Clarence Leslie Morton Jr. (uncle)
- Musical career
- Genres: R&B; pop; soul; funk; rock; Christian; jazz fusion
- Instruments: Vocals; keyboards
- Labels: Young Money; Cash Money; Republic; 222; Interscope; Morton Recordings; A&M/Octone
- Member of: Maroon 5
- Formerly of: PJ Morton Band
- Website: pjmortononline.com

Paul Sylvester "P.J." Morton Jr. (born March 29, 1981) is an American musician, singer, songwriter and record producer. In 2010, he joined pop rock band Maroon 5, as a touring member and became an official member after Jesse Carmichael went on a brief hiatus in 2012. During this period, Morton signed with Young Money to release his debut major-label studio album, New Orleans (2013), and later self-released Gumbo, which earned him two Grammy Award nominations for Best R&B Album and Best R&B Song at the 60th Annual Grammy Awards. Since then he has received six Grammy Awards.

Outside of music, Morton stated in 2019 that he would begin a project to restore the New Orleans home of jazz pioneer Buddy Bolden and create a museum and community space at the site. Bolden's former home has been owned by Morton's father's church for more than a decade, and had been cited for demolition by neglect.

== Early life and education ==
Morton was born in New Orleans, Louisiana. His father is Canadian-born American gospel singer and Founder of the Full Gospel Baptist Church Fellowship, Bishop Paul S. Morton. His mother is Dr. Debra Brown Morton, pastor of Greater St. Stephen Full Gospel Baptist Church.

Morton graduated St. Augustine High School and majored in marketing at Morehouse College, graduating in 2003.

== Career ==
=== Maroon 5 ===
In 2010, Morton's friend and Maroon 5's musical director Adam Blackstone asked him to audition for a position in the band as a touring keyboardist and backing vocalist. Morton was the first to audition and left an indelible mark on the group. Since then, he has played with Maroon 5 in concerts and other live performances. From 2012 to 2014 Morton filled-in for the band's keyboardist, Jesse Carmichael, who was on an indefinite hiatus from performing with the group, as stated on their official website in March 2012. Also in 2012, he joined the band as a full-time member, contributing his vocal and keyboard parts on Maroon 5's fourth studio album, Overexposed, and continuing to do so during the processes of recording the band's albums, V (2014), Red Pill Blues (2017), Jordi (2021), and Love Is Like (2025).

=== Signing to Young Money and New Orleans ===
Morton's solo work won the attention of Mack Maine, who signed him to his production company, Soothe Your Soul, and Young Money Entertainment in 2011. The Following My First Mind (EP) was released on March 27, 2012.

On May 14, 2013, Morton released his major-label debut studio album with Young Money Records, titled New Orleans. The album's lead single, "Only One", which features Stevie Wonder, was nominated for the Best R&B Song at the 56th Annual Grammy Awards in 2014.

=== Gumbo and Paul ===
In 2016, Morton moved to New Orleans and opened a record label called Morton Recordings which he envisioned as "the New Orleans Motown". Same year, Morton started working on Gumbo. About the album's title he said "I named it Gumbo because the actual dish is a bunch of things mixed in together to make [something] beautiful. I wanted to grow as a songwriter and talk about more things ... about where we are in the world today, the tension, how divided we are as a country. It kind of felt like I was dumping a bunch of subject matter together and I made it in New Orleans so that sounded like gumbo to me." As a first step, on March 25, 2016, Morton released Bounce & Soul Vol. 1, a mixtape which includes re-imagined versions of his best songs in New Orleans' bounce style. On July 1, 2016, Morton released the Sticking to My Guns EP, featuring the single of the same name. The EP, besides including alternative versions of "First Began" and "Sticking to My Guns", also contains "Say So", a song that was later cut from the final tracklist of the album. On November 15, 2016, Morton released "You Should Be Ashamed", a Stevie Wonder-esque socially conscious song that was later replaced by "Religion". On March 13, 2017, Morton announced on his Instagram page April 14, 2017 as the release date of Gumbo.

Gumbo did not manage to enter on the US Billboard 200 chart but received positive reviews from most music critics, who complimented Morton's style and praised him for his singing and songwriting. The album earned Morton two Grammy nominations for Best R&B Album and Best R&B Song at the 60th Annual Grammy Awards. On February 14, 2019, Morton collaborated with singer JoJo on the song "Say So", which served as the lead single for his sixth album Paul.

=== Gospel According To PJ and The Piano Album ===
In 2020, Morton recorded his live album, The Piano Album. It features songs from Gumbo and Paul. On August 28, 2020, Morton released his long awaited gospel album Gospel According to PJ. The album features The Clark Sisters, Commissioned, Zacardi Cortez, Darrel Walls, and others. It also features remade versions of So In Love by Amber Bullock, Over and Over by Trinitee 5:7, and Let Go by Dwayne Woods. A documentary was released talking about how he was pressured to make Gospel music, the process of each song, and his father. Don't Let Go from his previous album Paul was included featuring Kim Burrell. Do You Believe feat. Yolanda Adams was included from "Christmas With PJ Morton."

=== Other work ===
After winning Grammy Awards for his songwriting and production on India.Arie's Interested, Morton won Dove and Stellar Awards in 2008.

Morton was also noticed by AR Rahman, composer for Slumdog Millionaire, who asked Morton to contribute "Sajna" to the soundtrack and movie for the Vince Vaughn comedy Couples Retreat. Morton has also produced and written for musicians such as Jermaine Dupri, LL Cool J, Jagged Edge, Monica, India.Arie, gospel musicians Fred Hammond, Men of Standard, Brian Courtney Wilson, and Heather Headley. In 2009, he published a book entitled ' Why Can't I Sing About Love?

Morton who wrote a song called "Battle Field" by Chinese singer Jane Zhang from the 2016 film The Great Wall.

in October 2023, Morton was featured in Portuguese singer Barbara Bandeira's debut studio album Finda on the track Ego.

Morton wrote the song "Special Spice" for the theme park attraction Tiana's Bayou Adventure, which is inspired by Disney Animation's 2009 film The Princess and the Frog.

== Personal life ==
He married his wife Kortni Morton on December 25, 2008. They grew up attending the same church and began dating as adults. They have three children.

== Filmography ==
Year	Title	Role	Notes
2017	NCIS: New Orleans	Himself	Episode: "Return of the King"
2018	Nobody's Fool	Himself	
2020	Soul City	Terrence	Episode: "Give Man"
2021	American Idol	Himself / Performer	2 episodes
2022	Take Me to the River: New Orleans	Himself	Documentary film
2023	The Daily Show	Himself / Guest	Episode: "January 31"

=== Composer ===
Year	Title	Notes
2018	Champaign ILL	Web series; 10 episodes
2020	Soul City	3 episodes; co-composed with Zak Engel

== Discography ==
=== As solo artist ===
Studio albums

- Emotions (2005)
- Walk Alone (2010)
- New Orleans (2013)
- Gumbo (2017)
- Christmas with PJ Morton (2018)
- Paul (2019)
- Gospel According to PJ: From the Songbook of PJ Morton (2020)
- Watch the Sun (2022)
- Cape Town to Cairo (2024)
- Saturday Night/Sunday Morning (2026)

Live albums

- Live from LA (2008)
- Live Show Killer (2015)
- Gumbo Unplugged (2018)
- The Piano Album (2020)
- Watch the Sun Live: The Mansion Sessions (2023)

Mixtape

- Bounce & Soul Volume 1 (2016)

EPs

- Following My First Mind (2012)
- Sticking to My Guns (2016)

=== With the PJ Morton Band ===
- Perfect Song (2007)

=== With Maroon 5 ===
- Overexposed (2012)
- V (2014)
- Red Pill Blues (2017)
- Jordi (2021)
- Love Is Like (2025)

== Remixes ==
2017

- "The Cat Looks at the King (PJ Morton Remix)" – Collapsing Scenery featuring Good Joon and Buddy

== Awards and nominations ==
Grammy Awards

Year	Nominee / work	Award	Result
2013	"Payphone"	Best Pop Duo/Group Performance	Nominated
2013	Overexposed	Best Pop Vocal Album	Nominated
2014	"Only One"	Best R&B Song	Nominated
2016	"Sugar"	Best Pop Duo/Group Performance	Nominated
2018	Gumbo	Best R&B Album	Nominated
2018	"First Began"	Best R&B Song	Nominated
2019	"First Began"	Best R&B Performance	Nominated
2019	"Girls Like You"	Best Pop Duo/Group Performance	Nominated
2019	"How Deep Is Your Love"	Best Traditional R&B Performance	Won
2019	Gumbo Unplugged	Best R&B Album	Nominated
2020	"Say So"	Best R&B Song	Won
2020	"Built for Love"	Best Traditional R&B Performance	Nominated
2020	Paul	Best R&B Album	Nominated
2021	Gospel According to PJ: From the Songbook of PJ Morton	Best Gospel Album	Won
2022	"Bring It On Home To Me"	Best Traditional R&B Performance	Nominated
2022	We Are	Album of the Year	Won
2023	"Please Don't Walk Away"	Best R&B Song	Nominated
2023	Watch the Sun	Best R&B Album	Nominated
2023	"The Better Benediction"	Best Gospel Performance/Song	Nominated
2024	"Good Morning"	Best Traditional R&B Performance	Won
2026	"Amazing"	Best Contemporary Christian Music Performance/Song	Nominated
2026	Heart of Mine	Best Gospel Album	Won
2027	"Mess"	Best R&B Collaboration or Duo/Group Performance	Pending
2027	Saturday Night	Best R&B Album	Pending
2027	"Mercy"	Best Gospel Performance/Song	Pending
2027	Sunday Morning	Best Gospel Album	Pending

Stellar Awards

Year	Nominee / work	Award	Result
2026	Himself	Producer of the Year	Pending
2026	Heart of Mine	Recording Music Package of the Year	Pending
