= Episcopal Baptists =

Baptists groups with an episcopal polity

Although most Baptist groups are congregationalist in polity, some have different ecclesiastical organization and adopt an episcopal polity governance. In those churches the local congregation has less autonomy and the bishop oversees them, assigning pastors and distributing funds.

== Evangelical Baptist Union of Georgia ==
The Evangelical Baptist Union of Georgia have an episcopal polity, with an archbishop as the primate. Archbishop Malkhaz Songulashvili, minister of Peace Cathedral in Tbilisi is a charismatic figure and social activist.

== Union of Baptist Churches in Latvia ==
The Baptists of Latvia are result from a revival among German and Latvian Lutherans and organized their first church in 1861. The union is headed by a bishop.

== Episcopal Baptist Church in Congo ==
The Église Épiscopale Baptiste is a Baptist denomination in Democratic Republic of the Congo. It began with evangelical missionaries who accepted the Baptist doctrines and organized this denomination retaining the episcopal polity. The Church became autonomous in 1956.

In 2007 there were ten bishops, and 105,000 baptized members in 110 territorial parishes. Most of them were in the nine provinces of DRC and some in Angola and Zambia. The pastor are under supervision from the bishops, who assign them a church.

The EPB is a member of the World Council of Churches and the Église du Christ au Congo.

== Among African-American Baptists ==
A few African-American Baptist congregations have ordained or started calling their senior minister bishop, but without changing congregational polity. In the National Baptist Convention (USA), its statement of faith teaches the bishop and pastor are synonymous; in the Full Gospel Baptist Church Fellowship, the bishop and pastor are separate offices.

== India ==
The uniting Church of North India received Baptists when in its constitution and had the Baptist Samson Das ordained Bishop of Cuttack in 2006.
