= Clarence Leslie Morton Jr. =

African-American religious leader

The Right Reverend Clarence Leslie Morton Jr.
- Bishop
- Church: Church of God in Christ

Orders
- Consecration: 1962

Personal details
- Born: Clarence Leslie Morton Jr. September 18, 1942
- Died: April 11, 2020 (aged 77)
- Residence: Metro Detroit, U.S.
- Occupation: Pastor, author, Gospel singer, musician, speaker

Clarence Leslie Morton Jr. was an African-American religious leader within the Church of God in Christ. He was one of Bishop Paul S. Morton's siblings and the uncle of musician PJ Morton.

== Biography ==
Clarence Leslie Morton Jr. was born the son of Bishop Clarence Leslie Morton Sr. of the Church of God in Christ; his father pastored two churches in Windsor, Ontario, and Detroit, Michigan: the Mount Zion Full Gospel Church and the Greater Mount Zion Tabernacle.

Following the death of his father in 1962, he became one of the youngest bishops in the United States of America at the age of 20. He would later go on to serve as the prelate of COGIC's Canadian Jurisdiction, and then as an auxiliary bishop in the COGIC Michigan Southwest First Ecclesiastical Jurisdiction.

Bishop Morton died in April 2020, at the age of 77.
