= Say So (PJ Morton and JoJo song) =

2019 R&B Single by PJ Morton and JoJo

Single by PJ Morton and JoJo

from the album Paul
- Released: February 14, 2019
- Studio: The Parlor (New Orleans, Louisiana)
- Length: 3:32
- Label: Morton; Empire
- Songwriter: PJ Morton
- Producer: PJ Morton

PJ Morton singles chronology
"How Deep Is Your Love" (2018)	"Say So" (2019)	"Ready" (2019)

JoJo singles chronology
"Demonstrate (2018)" (2018)	"Say So" (2019)	"Joanna" (2019)

Music video
- "Say So" on YouTube

"Say So" is a duet recorded by American singer-songwriter PJ Morton and features additional vocals by American singer JoJo. The track was solely written and produced by PJ Morton. It was released on February 14, 2019, through Morton's own label Morton Records, as well as Empire, as the lead single from Morton's sixth studio album Paul (2019). The acoustic version of the song was featured on Morton's The Piano Album (2020).

== Composition ==
"Say So" was written by PJ Morton while also handling the song's production for his sixth studio album Paul (2019). The song includes additional vocals from American singer-songwriter JoJo. Morton also handled majority of the song's instrumentation except for bass which was played by DJ Raymond. The track was recorded with guidance by Reggie Nicholas at The Parlor recording studio in New Orleans, Louisiana. The mixing of "Say So" was done by Kevin "KD" Davis at Larrabee Studios in Los Angeles, California and eventually, the mastering was done by Will Quinnell at Sterling Sound in New York.

== Accolades ==
Year	Organization	Award	Result	Ref.
2019	Soul Train Music Awards	Best Collaboration	Nominated	
2020	62nd Grammy Awards	Best R&B Song	Won	
2020	51st NAACP Image Awards	Outstanding Duo, Group or Collaboration	Nominated	

== Music video ==
The music video for "Say So" was shot on location in New Orleans with director Nathan Corrona. In describing the videos concept Morton states "I really love how the simplicity of this video matches the simplicity of the song. There are no deep lyrics. No big words. If you love me, just say so. It's such a simple sentiment that we can all relate to... I just wanted it to capture a real-life relationship". The video follows JoJo and Morton at their houses performing the song in their bedroom, Morton and JoJo are never shown together, but their "tumultuous connection is palpable". Morton packs up his things and attempts to drive away, only to return, suitcase in hand at JoJo's door. The video made its world premiere on July 10, 2019, and debuted through Nylon magazine.

== Track listing ==
Digital download
No.	Title	Writer(s)	Producer(s)	Length
1.	"Say So" (featuring JoJo)	PJ Morton	Morton	3:32
Total length:				3:32

== Credits and personnel ==
Credits were adapted from the liner notes of Paul.

Recording

- Recorded at The Parlor, New Orleans, Louisiana
- Mixed at Larrabee Studios, Los Angeles, California
- Mastered at Sterling Sound, New York, NY

Personnel

- PJ Morton – vocals, writing, producer, all instruments
- JoJo – vocals
- Kevin “KD” Davis – mixing
- DJ Raymond – bass
- Reggie Nicholas – recording
- Mack Major – recording assistant
- Will Quinnell – audio mastering
- Tanya James – management
- Wade Jordan – management

== Charts ==
Chart (2019)	Peak position
US R&B/Hip-Hop Airplay (Billboard)	32
US Adult R&B Songs (Billboard)	8

== Release history ==
Region	Date	Format	Label	Ref.
Various	February 14, 2019	Digital download; streaming	Morton Records; Empire	
