= Jamal Harrison Bryant =

American pastor (born 1971)

The Reverend Doctor Jamal Harrison Bryant
- Church: New Birth Missionary Baptist Church, Stonecrest, Georgia

Personal details
- Born: May 21, 1971 (age 55) Boston, Massachusetts, U.S.
- Spouse: Gizelle Bryant (m. 2002; div. 2009) Dr. Karri Turner (m. 2024)
- Occupation: Senior Pastor
- Education: Morehouse College (BA); Duke University (MDiv); Graduate Theological Foundation (DMin)

Jamal Harrison Bryant (born May 21, 1971) is an American minister, author and former political candidate. He is the senior pastor of New Birth Missionary Baptist Church in Stonecrest, Georgia.

== Early life and education ==
Jamal Harrison Bryant was born on May 21, 1971, in Boston, Massachusetts, to John Richard and Cecelia Bryant (née Williams). He has a younger sister. He was raised in the Westside neighborhood of Baltimore, Maryland, where, as a child, he attended his father's church Bethel A.M.E. Church. He preached his first sermon when he was a child at Bethel titled "No Pain, No Gain."

Bryant attended Morehouse College where he earned an undergraduate degree in political science and international studies. He obtained a master's of divinity degree from Duke University. He received a doctorate of ministry degree from the Graduate Theological Foundation. However, the Graduate Theological Foundation is not accredited by the Association of American Theological Schools (ATS). Bryant is a member of the Kappa Alpha Psi fraternity.

=== Ministry ===
In April 2000, Pastor Jamal Bryant founded the Empowerment Temple African Methodist Episcopal Church in Baltimore, Maryland, and served for 18 years. In December 2018, he became pastor of New Birth Missionary Baptist Church in Stonecrest, Georgia.

== Politics ==
Bryant ostensibly ran for U.S. Congress in 2015, aiming to represent Baltimore, Maryland, as a Democrat. He suspended his campaign less than two weeks after announcing his run.

In a February 2, 2025, service, Bryant announced a 40-day initiative to boycott the retailer Target for eliminating their diversity, equity, and inclusion (DEI) commitments. The original boycott was planned to run from March 3 to April 19, but on April 20, Easter Sunday, he announced that the initiative would now be indefinite.

== Personal Life ==
In 2002, Bryant married Gizelle Bryant, star on the reality TV show The Real Housewives of Potomac. The couple have three daughters together: Grace and twins Angel and Adore.The couple separated in 2008 and finalized their divorce in 2009, following Bryant admission of infidelity. Several years after their divorce, Bryant and Gizelle Bryant rekindled a romantic relationship. Their reconciliation was documented on the show, however the couple eventually ended their relationship.

Bryant additionally has children from other relationships. Bryant later remarried in 2024 to Dr. Karri Turner.

== Controversies ==
In 2022, in Rashan Ali's "Cool Soror" podcast, he said he wanted to develop a "new gospel for adults" who are used to having sex (suggesting celibacy as a reasonable message for teenagers, but an off-putting one for older single adults), and further suggested that he wanted to grow marijuana on the land of the church to attract young men. Bishop Patrick Wooden Sr., pastor of the Upper Room Church of God in Christ in Raleigh, North Carolina, said, "I’m holding out that this is like that Babylon Bee thing [i.e., satire]," but continued, addressing the likelihood that it was not, saying that "[m]arijuana is not... a harmless drug... Depressions are up... suicides are up. It’s a gateway..." that "in and of itself [it] is bad," even if not leading to other drugs, "ruining high school students, messing up their minds, messing up their development". He continues with what he perceives to be the spiritual implication, referencing Romans 1:28-32:

we are witnessing... [t]he worst thing that God can do... to turn us over to ourselves... [f]or that means the Holy Spirit will no longer... bring any conviction".
