= Gumbo Unplugged =

Live album by PJ Morton
- Released: March 9, 2018 (US)
- Recorded: 2018
- Studio: Power Station Studios
- Genres: R&B; soul; funk; jazz-fusion
- Length: 39:49
- Label: Morton Recordings
- Producers: PJ Morton (also exec.); Luke Witherspoon

PJ Morton chronology
| Gumbo (2017) | Gumbo Unplugged (2018) | Paul (2019) |

Gumbo Unplugged is the third live album and fifth overall by American singer-songwriter PJ Morton. It was released on March 9, 2018, by Morton Recordings, as the follow-up to his fourth studio album Gumbo (2017). The album is entirely live recorded and features guest appearances by Keyon Harrold, BJ the Chicago Kid, Lecrae, Yebba, and R&B singer Anthony Hamilton's back-up group The HamilTones, with string arrangements by Matt Jones with the participation of violinist Scott Tixier.

Gumbo Unplugged earned Morton three Grammy nominations for Best R&B Album, Best R&B Performance and Best Traditional R&B Performance at the 61st Annual Grammy Awards. The song "How Deep Is Your Love" featuring Yebba tied for Best Traditional R&B Performance, a first Grammy win for both artists.

== Track listing ==
| No. | Title | Writer(s) | Producer(s) | Length |
|---|---|---|---|---|
| 1. | "Sticking To My Guns" | PJ Morton | PJ Morton | 4:38 |
| 2. | "Claustrophobic" (featuring Keyon Harrold) | PJ Morton, Pell | PJ Morton | 5:10 |
| 3. | "Religion" (featuring Lecrae) | PJ Morton, Lecrae Moore | PJ Morton | 5:09 |
| 4. | "How Deep Is Your Love (Live)" (featuring Yebba) | Bee Gees | PJ Morton | 3:30 |
| 5. | "First Began" | PJ Morton | PJ Morton | 3:18 |
| 6. | "Go Thru Your Phone" | PJ Morton | PJ Morton | 4:28 |
| 7. | "They Gon' Wanna Come (Live)" | PJ Morton | PJ Morton | 4:01 |
| 8. | "Alright" | PJ Morton | PJ Morton | 1:43 |
| 9. | "Everything's Gonna Be Alright" (featuring BJ the Chicago Kid and The Hamiltones) | PJ Morton | PJ Morton | 7:32 |
