= Saturday Night/Sunday Morning =

Studio album by PJ Morton
- Released: June 19, 2026
- Studio: Studio in the Country
- Genres: Gospel; jazz; R&B; pop; reggae fusion
- Length: 58:28
- Labels: Morton Records; SRG-ILS Group
- Producer: PJ Morton

PJ Morton chronology
| Cape Town to Cairo (2024) | Saturday Night/Sunday Morning (2026) |

Singles from Saturday Night/Sunday Morning
- 1. "Mutual" Released: April 3, 2026; 2. "Mercy" Released: April 10, 2026; 3. "Sell My Soul" Released: May 8, 2026; 4. "Close Enough" Released: May 29, 2026

Saturday Night/Sunday Morning is the tenth solo studio album by American singer-songwriter PJ Morton. Issued as a double album. It was released by Morton Records and SRG-ILS Group on Juneteenth, June 19, 2026. Recording took place at Studio in the Country in Bogalusa, Louisiana.

== Background ==
Although Morton wrote a memoir in 2024 titled Saturday Night, Sunday Morning: Staying True to Myself from the Pews to the Stage, he had no intention of writing a double album bearing the same title. Once music-making was in mind, he wasn't called to making a regular R&B album nor gospel. Once he took a break from focusing on his own music, and started collaborating with fellow New Orleanian La Reezy and Houston-based Darrel Walls, the concept of a double came to him. The concept of "Saturday Nights" and "Sunday Mornings" was inspired by his own oscillation between secular and sacred spaces throughout his career.

For the Saturday Night side, there are reggae rhythms, R&B, jazz and features the only two guest artists on the entire project, trumpeter Keyon Harrold and singer-songwriter Rukhsana Merrise. For Sunday Morning, Morton believes that this is his first "proper" gospel album because “it’s the first one where I’m singing the songs all by myself.”

=== Genre ===
Morton explored pop, R&B, reggae, and gospel elements, highlighting the Black experience.

== Tour ==
On April 22, Morton announced his concert tour, the Saturday Night, Sunday Morning Tour, in support of the album. Consisting of 30 dates across North America, the tour will begin on July 19, 2026 in St. Louis, Missouri, and conclude on November 27, 2026 in New Orleans, Louisiana.

== Critical reception ==
Professional ratings
Review scores
| Source | Rating |
|---|---|
| Shatter the Standards | 4/5 stars |

Early reception to Saturday Night/Sunday Morning has emphasized the album’s dichotomy, highlighted through the R&B and gospel messaging. Independent outlets such as Shatter the Standards have discussed the album’s two halves being connected by Morton’s struggle with being the person others depend on while needing support himself, praising the album’s vulnerability.

== Track listing ==
All tracks are written and produced by PJ Morton, except where noted.

Saturday Night track listing
| No. | Title | Writer(s) | Length |
|---|---|---|---|
| 1. | "Mutual" | Morton; EJ Ross | 3:50 |
| 2. | "Mess" (featuring Keyon Harrold) | Morton; Brian Cockerham; Keyon Harrold | 3:10 |
| 3. | "Don't Give Up on Us" | | 2:28 |
| 4. | "Listened to You" | | 3:13 |
| 5. | "Sell My Soul" | | 3:44 |
| 6. | "Used To Be" | | 2:26 |
| 7. | "Protect My Heart" | | 3:48 |
| 8. | "Can We Try Love Again" | | 3:52 |
| 9. | "Autopsy" (featuring Rukhsana Merrise) | | 2:43 |
| 10. | "Feeling Free" | | 3:16 |
| 11. | "Mercy" | | 2:27 |
| 12. | "Could've Been Me" | | 2:57 |
| 13. | "Bless His Name" | | 2:26 |
| 14. | "Always on Time" | | 3:20 |
| 15. | "Not Alone" | | 3:22 |
| 16. | "Close Enough" | | 3:56 |
| 17. | "Waiting for You" | | 3:28 |
| 18. | "Yesterday Today Forevermore" | | 4:02 |
| Total length: | | | 58:28 |

=== Note ===
- Tracks 1–9 are grouped under Saturday Night while tracks 10–18 are grouped under Sunday Morning.

== Personnel ==
Credits are adapted from Tidal.

- PJ Morton – lead vocals, background vocals, Fender Rhodes, keyboards, organ, piano, production
- Reggie Nic – engineering
- Mikaelin "Blue" Bluespruce – mixing
- Colin Leonard – mastering
- Keyon Harrold – trumpet (1, 2, 4, 5), flugelhorn (2, 4, 5)
- Chris Payton – guitar (1, 3, 5–7, 9–12, 14, 15, 17, 18)
- Thaddeus Tribbett – bass guitar (1, 10, 11)
- Brian Cockerham – bass guitar (2–4, 6–9, 14, 15, 17, 18)
- Zahria Sims – saxophone (3, 12)
- TJ Norris – trombone (3, 12)
- Julian "Juice" Gosin – trumpet (3, 12)
- Big Ed – drums (6–8, 10, 12, 16, 18)
- Mike Esneault – strings conducting (6, 7, 16, 17)
- Manuel Papale – cello (6, 7, 16)
- Amelia Clingman – viola (6, 7, 16)
- Benjamin Thacher – viola (6, 7, 16)
- Rafael Gargate – viola (6, 7, 16)
- Zorica Dimova – violin (6, 7, 16)
- Hannah Yim – violin (6, 7, 16)
- Benjamin Hart – violin (6)
- Philip von Maltzahn – cello (7, 16)
- Cassidy Franzmeier – violin (7, 16)
- Gabriel Platica – violin (7, 16)
- Gabrielle Fischler – violin (7, 16)
- Sarah Yen – violin (7, 16)
- Matt Jones – strings conducting (9)
- Prgrshn – engineering (9)
