= New Orleans (album) =

Studio album by PJ Morton
- Released: May 14, 2013 (U.S.)
- Recorded: 2012–2013
- Studios: • Encore Studios, Burbank, California; • Dogwood Recording Studios, Conyers, Georgia; • Fever Recording Studios, North Hollywood, California; • Fly Nerd Studios, Los Angeles, California
- Length: 34:10
- Labels: Young Money, Cash Money, Republic
- Producers: PJ Morton, Warryn Campbell

PJ Morton chronology
| Following My First Mind (2012) | New Orleans (2013) | Gumbo (2017) |

Singles from New Orleans
- 1. "Only One" Released: January 28, 2013

New Orleans is the major-label debut studio album by American musician PJ Morton. The album was released on May 14, 2013, under Young Money, Cash Money and Republic Records. The album is primarily produced by PJ Morton and features guest appearances by Lil Wayne, Tweet, Stevie Wonder, Busta Rhymes and Adam Levine.

== Accolades ==
The album's lead single, "Only One", which features Stevie Wonder, was nominated for the Best R&B Song at the 56th Annual Grammy Awards in 2014.

== Track listing ==
All songs written and produced by PJ Morton, except where noted.

New Orleans track listing
| No. | Title | Writer(s) | Producer(s) | Length |
|---|---|---|---|---|
| 1. | "New Orleans" | | | 1:35 |
| 2. | "Only One" (featuring Stevie Wonder) | | PJ Morton, Warryn Campbell | 3:52 |
| 3. | "Never Get Over You" (featuring Busta Rhymes) | Morton, Trevor Smith | | 1:22 |
| 4. | "Heavy" (featuring Adam Levine) | | | 3:07 |
| 5. | "Hard Enough" | | | 3:32 |
| 6. | "Work It Out" | | PJ Morton, Warryn Campbell | 3:32 |
| 7. | "Trade It All" | | | 3:18 |
| 8. | "First Sight" | | PJ Morton, Warryn Campbell | 2:28 |
| 9. | "Always Be" | | | 2:59 |
| 10. | "Go Alone" | | | 4:31 |
| 11. | "Motions" | | | 3:54 |
| Total length: | | | | 34:10 |

European bonus tracks
| No. | Title | Length |
|---|---|---|
| 12. | "Only One" (Live at Soul Night) |
| 13. | "Heavy" (Live at Soul Night) |

Digital Deluxe Version bonus tracks
| No. | Title | Writer(s) | Length |
|---|---|---|---|
| 12. | "Love You More" (featuring Tweet) | | 3:28 |
| 13. | "Lover" (featuring Lil Wayne) | Morton, Dwayne Carter | 3:04 |
| Total length: | | | 40:44 |

== Personnel ==
All credits for New Orleans are adapted from the album's liner notes and Tidal.

Musicians

- PJ Morton – lead vocals, keyboards, drum programming (all); bass (1–3); guitar (1); piano (live tracks); recording (4)
- Dwayne Dugger – saxophone (1, 3, 4)
- James King – trumpet (1, 3, 4)
- Stevie Wonder – featured vocals, harmonica (2)
- Warryn "Baby Dubb" Campbell – co-production, additional drum programming (2, 6, 8); additional keyboards (8)
- Curt Chambers – guitar (2, 7, 10, 11)
- Mike Moore – drums (2)
- Dontae Winslow – trumpet (2)
- Kamasi Washington – saxophone (2)
- Busta Rhymes – featured rap vocals (3)
- Jesse Bond – guitar (3, "Love You More")
- Chris "Daddy" Dave – drums (3)
- Adam Levine – featured vocals (4) (Note: Morton, Levine and Valentine are all members of Maroon 5.)
- James Valentine – guitar (4–6, 8, 9)
- Brian Cockerham – bass (4–9)
- Ed Clark – drums (5–8)
- Stefan Smith – viola (5)
- Stephanie Matthews – violin (5, 10)
- Brittany Cotto – violin (5); viola (10)
- Clair Courchene – cello (5)
- Marisa Sorajja – violin (10)
- Adrienne Woods – cello (10)
- Yann Negrit – guitar (live tracks)
- Julien Herne – bass (live tracks)
- Guillaume Poncelet – piano, musical director (live tracks)
- Arnaud Renaville – drums (live tracks)
- Stephane Edouard – percussion (live tracks)
- Christophe Panzani – saxophone (live tracks)
- Betrand Luzignant – trombone (live tracks)
- Vincent Payen – trumpet (live tracks)
- Connie Bidouzo – choir ("Only One" live)
- Ope Smith – choir ("Only One" live)
- Ulrich Kwasi – choir ("Only One" live)
- Tweet – featured vocals ("Love You More")
- Charles Chaffer – percussion ("Love You More")
- Edward "Big Ed" Clark – ("Love You More")
- Lil' Wayne – featured rap vocals ("Lover"); executive producer (credited as Dwayne "The President" Carter for executive production)

Technical personnel

- Jermaine Preyan – executive producer
- Bryan "Baby Birdman" Williams – executive producer
- Ronald "Slim Tha Don" Williams – executive producer
- Fabian Marascuillo – mixing (1, 3, 7–11)
- Manny Marroquin – mixing (2, 4–6)
- Gilles Olivesi – mixing (live tracks)
- Sean Phelan – mixing, engineering ("Lover")
- Sam Bohl – assistant mixing engineer (1, 3, 7–11)
- Chris Galland – assistant mixing engineer (2, 4–6)
- Del Bowers – assistant mixing engineer (2, 4–6)
- Noah "Mailbox" Passavoy – recording engineer (1, 2, 5–11)
- Bruce Buechner – recording engineer (2, 6)
- Ron Benner – recording engineer (3–9)
- Michael "BANGER" Cadahia – recording engineer ("Lover")
- Chris Athens – mastering
- Steven Taylor – photography
- Joe Spix – art direction, package design
- Olivia Smith – package design
- Joshua Berkman – A&R

== Charts ==
| Chart (2013) | Peak position |
|---|---|
| US Billboard 200 | 194 |
| US Top R&B/Hip-Hop Albums (Billboard) | 23 |
