= Gumbo (PJ Morton album) =

Album by PJ Morton

Studio album by PJ Morton
- Released: April 21, 2017 (US)
- Recorded: 2016–2017
- Studios: The Parlor studio; (New Orleans, Los Angeles)
- Genres: R&B; soul; funk; jazz-fusion
- Length: 28:32
- Label: Morton Recordings
- Producers: PJ Morton (also exec.); Luke Witherspoon

PJ Morton chronology
New Orleans (2013)	Gumbo (2017)	Gumbo Unplugged (2018)

Singles from Gumbo
- 1. "Claustrophobic" Released: March 8, 2017

Gumbo is the fourth and first self-released studio album by American singer-songwriter PJ Morton. It was released on April 14, 2017, by Morton Recordings, as the follow-up to his third studio album New Orleans (2013). The record incorporates R&B styles with elements of older soul music; its lyrics discuss themes of romance and explores political and personal themes. The album is entirely produced by Morton himself and features guest appearances by Pell, BJ the Chicago Kid and R&B singer Anthony Hamilton's back-up group, The HamilTones. The album features a cover of the Bee Gees' "How Deep Is Your Love".

Gumbo did not manage to enter on the US Billboard 200 chart but, upon its release, it received positive reviews from most music critics, who complimented Morton's style and praised him for his singing and songwriting.

Gumbo earned Morton two Grammy nominations for Best R&B Album and Best R&B Song at the 60th Annual Grammy Awards.

== Background ==
In 2016, Morton moved to New Orleans and opened a record label called Morton Records which he envisioned as "the New Orleans Motown." Same year, Morton started working on Gumbo. About the album's title he said "I named it Gumbo because the actual dish is a bunch of things mixed in together to make [something] beautiful. I wanted to grow as a songwriter and talk about more things ... about where we are in the world today, the tension, how divided we are as a country. It kind of felt like I was dumping a bunch of subject matter together and I made it in New Orleans so that sounded like gumbo to me." As a first step, on March 25, 2016, Morton released Bounce & Soul Vol. 1, a mixtape which includes re-imagined versions of his best songs in New Orleans' bounce style. On July 1, 2016, Morton released the Sticking to My Guns EP, featuring the single of the same name. The EP, besides including alternative versions of "First Began" and "Sticking to My Guns", it also contains "Say So", a song that was later cut from the final tracklist of the album. On November 15, 2016, Morton released "You Should Be Ashamed", a Stevie Wonder-esque socially conscious song that was later replaced by "Religion". On March 13, 2017, Morton announced on his Instagram page April 14, 2017 as the release date of Gumbo.

== Singles ==
On April 21, 2015, Morton released an early version of "Claustrophobic", a song in which Morton expresses his frustrations with the music industry. Initially, the song wasn't supposed to be an official single but, as Morton said, the song was "something I wanted to get off of my chest". On March 8, 2017, Morton released a reworked version of "Claustrophobic" as the albums's first official single which, unlike the first version, contains new vocals, a completely different instrumentation and a rap by Pell.

=== Promotional singles ===
"Everything's Gonna Be Alright" featuring BJ the Chicago Kid and The HamilTones was released as part of the instant-great tracks, along with the album's pre-order on iTunes.

== Promotion ==
To promote the album further, Morton announced on June 23, 2017, that he would embark on The Gumbo World Tour, his first concert tour on a global scale. Promoted primarily by Morton Records, the tour will debut on June 30, 2017, in New Orleans. Twenty-nine additional dates were also announced across Australia and Europe, ending on September 16, 2017, in Paris, France.

== Critical reception ==
Gumbo was positively reviewed by a number of critics. Jonathan Landrum Jr. of The Washington Post said "Morton's fourth offering is a short listen, lasting less than 30 minutes. But in nine tracks, he takes advantage of every last second, speaking on various topics, from love to religion." Producer Warryn Campbell, who has worked with Kanye West, R. Kelly and Alicia Keys, posted on his Instagram page that "Gumbo" is the "album of the decade." op music critic Keith Spera wrote in The Advocate daily newspaper that the new album, "expands Morton's songwriting range beyond love and relationships" to include issues of the world at large. L. Michael Gipson of Soul Tracks wrote that the set is, "Perhaps Morton's most grown and fulfilling in years." In short, Hip Hop producer, 9th Wonder, posted to his IG account that Gumbo is, "refreshing...this album is jamming."

=== Accolades ===
Gumbo received a Grammy nomination for Best R&B Album. The lead song on the album, "First Began", has also been nominated for Best R&B Song.

Year	Ceremony	Nominated work	Category	Result
2017	Grammy Awards	Gumbo	Best R&B Album	Nominated
2017	Grammy Awards	First Began	Best R&B Song	Nominated

== Commercial performance ==
Despite being critically acclaimed, the album has been seen as a commercial failure. Gumbo failed to enter on the US Billboard 200 chart. Still, it debuted number 10 on the Heatseekers Albums chart. - an astounding feat for an indie album without major radio airplay support. It also peaked at number 5 and number 9 respectively on the Heatseekers-South Atlantic and Heatseekers-South Central charts. The set rose to No. 16 on the R&B Album sales chart, number 28 on the Independent Albums chart and number 30 on the R&B/Hip-Hop Album chart.

== Track listing ==
No.	Title	Writer(s)	Producer(s)	Length
1.	"First Began"	PJ Morton	PJ Morton	3:53
2.	"Claustrophobic" (featuring Pell)	PJ Morton, Pell	PJ Morton	3:48
3.	"Sticking to My Guns"	PJ Morton	PJ Morton	3:41
4.	"Religion"	PJ Morton	PJ Morton	3:22
5.	"Alright"	PJ Morton	PJ Morton	1:55
6.	"Everything's Gonna Be Alright" (featuring BJ the Chicago Kid and The HamilTones)	PJ Morton	PJ Morton	2:43
7.	"They Gon' Wanna Come"	PJ Morton	PJ Morton	3:25
8.	"Go Thru Your Phone"	PJ Morton	PJ Morton, Luke Witherspoon	2:28
9.	"How Deep Is Your Love"	The Bee Gees	PJ Morton	3:17

== Charts ==
Chart (2016)	Peak position
US Top R&B/Hip-Hop Albums (Billboard)	30
