= New Birth Missionary Baptist Church =

Coordinates: 33.6990°N 84.1364°W

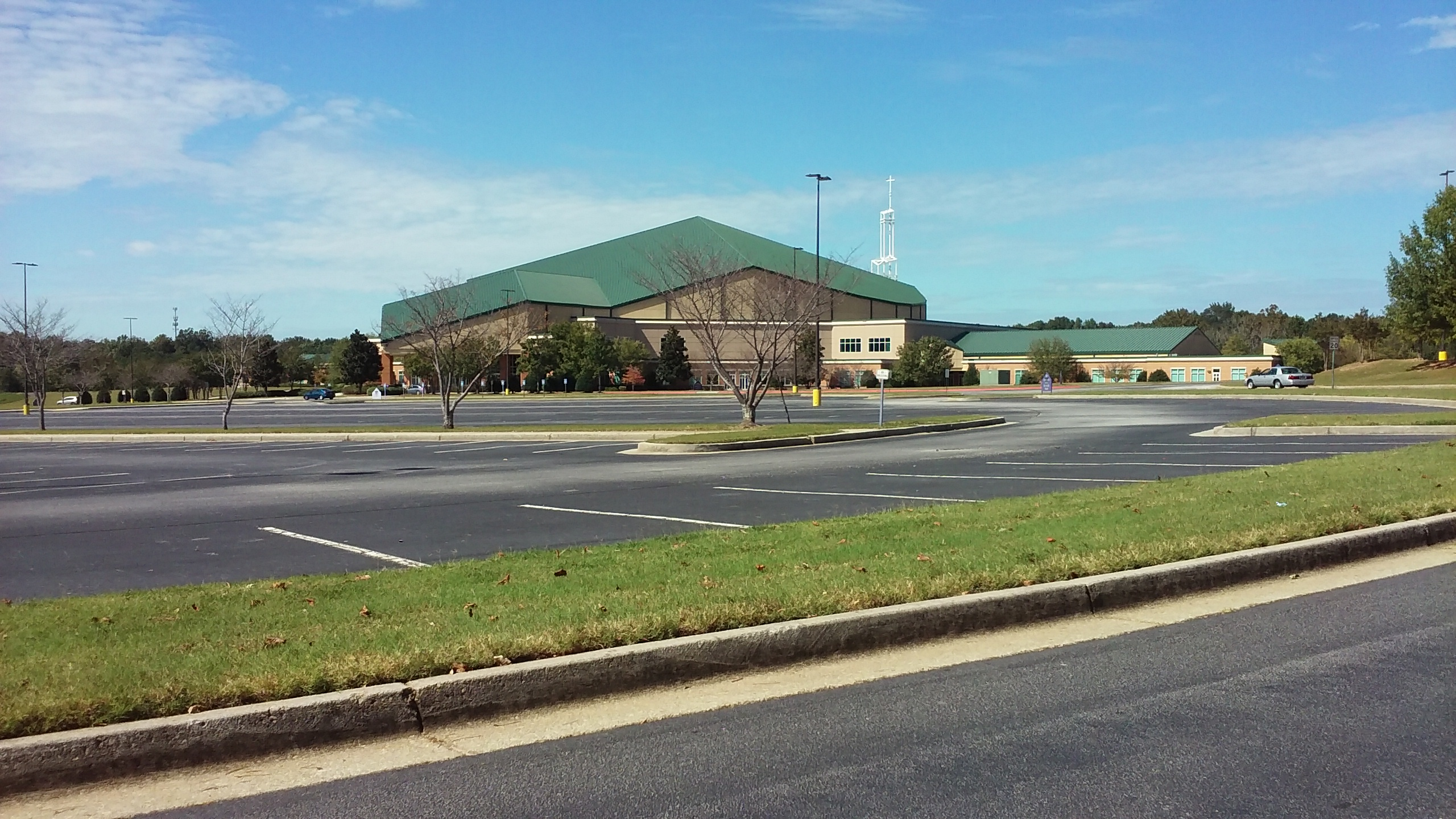
- New Birth MBC in 2017
- New Birth Missionary Baptist Church
- Location: 6400 Woodrow Road at Bishop Eddie L. Long Parkway Stonecrest
- Country: United States
- Website: newbirth.org

History
- Founded: (1939); 1983

Specifications
- Capacity: Kenneth Samuel (1984-1987) Eddie Long (1987 - 2017) Stephen Davis (2017-2018) Jamal Harrison Bryant

New Birth Missionary Baptist Church, also known as New Birth Cathedral, is a progressive charismatic Christian Baptist megachurch in Stonecrest, DeKalb County, Georgia. Celebrity pastor Jamal Bryant is the senior pastor since 2018.

== History ==
The church was founded in 1939 in Scottdale as Travelers Rest Baptist Church. In 1983, it moved to Decatur and adopted its current name. Eddie Long took over as pastor in 1987. At the time, the church had only 300 members.

In 1994, New Birth became a member of the Full Gospel Baptist Church Fellowship.

In 2001, it dedicated a new building including a 6,056-seat auditorium.

In 2002, New Birth was chosen to host the live recording of Dorinda Clark-Cole. This same year, it was chosen by the family of rapper and R&B superstar Lisa Left Eye Lopes to host the funeral for the rapper, who was killed in a car accident in La Ceiba, Honduras.

In 2003, New Birth planted a branch called "New Birth Charlotte" in Charlotte, North Carolina. The campus closed its doors in 2013, and has since sold its building. Mecklenburg County records show the church defaulted on its payments to Evangelical Christian Credit Union for a $10 million loan.

On August 15, 2004 the church opened a branch called "New Birth Memphis" in Memphis, Tennessee. The church has since closed and New Birth Memphis no longer exists.

In 2005, international gospel recording artist Bishop William Murphy, who also served as the Minister of Music before founding The dReam Center Church of Atlanta, recorded his debut album, All Day, at New Birth.

Then in the future years, there were more churches such as New Birth Metro, New Birth Knoxville, New Birth Oakland, and New Birth California.

In 2006, the church was chosen by the family of Coretta Scott King, widow of Martin Luther King Jr., to host and officiate her funeral. The event was attended by four Presidents (George H. W. Bush, Bill Clinton, George W. Bush and Jimmy Carter).

In 2008, the church ended its partnership with the Full Gospel Baptist Church Fellowship.

In 2010, the church had 25,000 members.

In 2018, the church had 10,000 members.

On January 15, 2017, Bishop Eddie Long died from an aggressive form of cancer according to a statement released by the church.

In 2017, Stephen A. Davis, pastor of New Birth Birmingham in Birmingham, Alabama became senior pastor while remaining pastor of the Birmingham. However in June, 2018 Bishop Davis resigned.

In December 2018, Jamal Bryant became senior pastor.

== Medical clinic ==
In November 2023, the Church inaugurated a community medical clinic in the church fitness center.

== Controversies ==
=== Salary and Senate investigation ===
In 2005, The Atlanta Journal-Constitution reported that between 1997 and 2000, Eddie Long received more than $3.07 million worth of compensation and benefits from his non-profit charity, 'Bishop Eddie Long Ministries Inc.' Long contended that the charity did not solicit donations from members but instead gained its income from royalties, speaking fees and several large donations. In 2007 a three-year investigation by the United States Senate Committee on Finance into the tax-exempt status of six ministries, including Long's, concluded that there were no definitive findings of wrongdoing. Donations to the church dropped significantly following the investigation of Long's salary and church finances.

=== Allegations of sexual impropriety and lawsuits ===
In September 2010, Maurice Robinson, Anthony Flagg, Jamal Parris and Spencer LeGrande filed separate lawsuits alleging that Eddie Long used his pastoral influence to coerce them into sexual relationships with him. The plaintiffs state that Long placed the men on the church's payroll, bought them cars and other gifts, including overseas trips.

In May 2011, that the lawsuits were settled out of court; terms were undisclosed. Later on, media outlets indicated that Centino Kemp was the fifth accuser who also settled.

=== Marijuana cultivation project ===
In 2022, in Rashan Ali's "Cool Soror" podcast, Jamal Bryant said he wanted to develop a "new gospel for adults" who are used to having sex and wanted to grow marijuana on the land of the church to attract young people to church. Bishop Patrick Wooden Sr., pastor of the Upper Room Church of God in Christ in Raleigh, North Carolina, criticized that project, saying that marijuana is a dangerous drug that led to depression and suicides.
