= Full Gospel Baptist Church Fellowship =

American Charismatic Baptist denomination

- Full Gospel Baptist Seal
- Abbreviation: FGBCF, FGBCFI
- Classification: Protestant
- Orientation: Baptist
- Theology: Baptist; Full Gospel; Holiness; Charismatic
- Polity: Episcopal
- Governance: Council of Bishops
- Presiding Bishop: Joseph W. Walker III
- Founder: Paul S. Morton
- Origin: 1992
- Separated from: National Baptist Convention
- Separations: Global United Fellowship
- Congregations: 10,000
- Members: 2,000,000
- Official website: fullgospelbaptist.org

The Full Gospel Baptist Church Fellowship (FGBCF) or Full Gospel Baptist Church Fellowship International (FGBCFI) is a predominantly African-American, Charismatic Baptist denomination established by Bishop Paul Sylvester Morton—a Gospel singer and former National Baptist pastor. Founded as a response to traditional black Baptists upholding cessationism, Full Gospel Baptists advocate for the operation of Pentecostal/Charismatic Christian spiritual gifts, while also holding to traditional Baptist doctrine.

Reminiscing early Baptist Christianity's acceptance of the bishopric being synonymous with the pastorate within congregationalist tenets per the 1689 Baptist Confession of Faith (as Baptists originated in 1609 from the Church of England, which schismed with the Roman Church—both upholding the historic episcopacy), Full Gospel Baptists developed a presbyteral-episcopal polity not found in the historic black Baptist denominations while maintaining congregationalist distinctives.

The FGBCF was reported to have over 10,000 active members in 1993 and 20,000 in 1995; in 1997 it claimed 1 million members and 5,000 churches throughout the United States. As of 2020, they reported having approximately 2 million members; in 2023, Full Gospel Baptists had approximately 10,000 churches. Churches aligned with Full Gospel Baptists may affiliate with other Christian denomination, and aren't required to change their names. Headquartered in Atlanta, Georgia, the Full Gospel Baptist Church Fellowship is led by Bishop Joseph W. Walker III, of Nashville, Tennessee as the Full Gospel Presiding Bishop, who was appointed to succeed Bishop Morton upon his retirement.

== History ==
The Full Gospel Baptist Church Fellowship was established by Bishop Paul S. Morton Sr. in 1994 within New Orleans, Louisiana, though it began as a movement within the National Baptist Convention, USA in 1992. From 25,000 to 30,000 attended the first conference of the Full Gospel Baptist Church Fellowship in 1994.

Exploring the gifts of the Holy Spirit against traditionally cessationist Baptist pastors and laymen within the National Baptist Convention, National Baptist Convention of America, and the Progressive National Baptist Convention, alongside establishing an episcopal Baptist governance, Morton and those affiliated with the fellowship "were lovingly advised to resign their posts with the NBCUSA before they were kicked out." National Baptist leadership feared the movement would develop into a separate denomination, urging members to either remain within the convention or leave; the National Baptist Convention's then-president, Rev. Henry J. Lyons, disapproved of the movement's belief in tongues and divine healing. In 1995, Bishop Morton left the National Baptist Convention, USA following the controversies among traditional black Baptists.

Attracting some of the largest churches by membership from the oldest black Baptist denomination—the NBC USA—New Birth Missionary Baptist Church became a notable affiliate before leaving the fellowship during Bishop Eddie Long's pastoral tenure after multiple controversies surrounding their leadership at New Birth. Eddie Long was consecrated a bishop by Paul Morton in the 1994.

In 2013, Bishop Morton announced his intent to resign as Presiding Bishop of the Full Gospel Baptist Church Fellowship. He appointed Bishop Joseph W. Walker III in Nashville, Tennessee as successor. Walker, born in Shreveport, Louisiana and serving as one of the founding fathers of the Full Gospel Baptist Church Fellowship, assumed presiding office in 2015 and Bishop Neil Ellis schismed through establishing the Global United Fellowship after resigning and losing the election to succeed Morton.

== Organization ==
Embracing a mixture of congregationalist, presbyterian, and episcopal polity, Full Gospel Baptists as a collective are governed by the Full Gospel Baptist Council of Bishops. The presiding bishop is the head clerical and executive leader of the fellowship, exercising authority along with other episcopates to provide administration. Full Gospel Baptists ordain and consecrate a significant number of female pastors and bishops as well, although the majority of their clergy is still male. Its women clergy operate an organization called the Daughters of the Promise, or Full Gospel International Women's Fellowship.

== Doctrine ==
Like most Baptist denominations, Full Gospel Baptists uphold Trinitarianism, biblical infallibility, believer's baptism; and congregational autonomy. However, in addition to traditional Baptist doctrine, the fellowship also believes in Pentecostal-Charismatic doctrines such as speaking in tongues, laying on of hands, divine healing, and prophecy. Likewise, the Full Gospel Baptist Church Fellowship places special emphasis on practicing holiness, or Christian sanctification; overall, their theological distinctives tend to merge with the separate Protestant tradition of Wesleyan-Arminian theology.

=== Apostolic succession ===
Within the Full Gospel Baptist Church Fellowship, its bishops have attempted to claim apostolic succession through one of Bishop Morton's consecrators—the excommunicated Roman Catholic George Augustus Stallings. Stallings assisted in consecrating Morton in March 1993. Relieved of religious duties within the Roman Catholic Church, the concept of "valid but illicit" ordinations guaranteed Stallings episcopacy and historic claims remaining valid to whoever recognized it as such. Apostolic succession though, according to Roman and Anglican churches however, is more than the historic lineage or episcopacy; it effects the power and authority to administer the sacraments except for baptism and matrimony; and it pertains to continuity of the universal teaching, preaching, governing, ordination, and grace. The Roman Catholic Church, considering the sacraments descending from Independent Catholics and Old Catholics as valid but illicit dependent upon the doctrine of ex opere operato, does not recognize the sacrament of holy orders for women into the presbyterate or episcopacy; thereby rendering women as invalidly ordained and consecrated along with Full Gospel Baptists' lack of a sacrificial priesthood. Additionally, Stallings was repudiated by his chief consecrator for lacking theological continuity and "voodoo ceremonies."
