= Paul S. Morton =

American Baptist pastor (born 1950)

The Right Reverend Paul S. Morton
- Founder and Presiding Bishop-Emeritus of the Full Gospel Baptist Church Fellowship
- Church: Full Gospel Baptist Church Fellowship

Orders
- Consecration: March 1993 by Clarence Leslie Morton Jr.

Personal details
- Born: Paul Sylvester Morton Sr. July 30, 1950 (age 76)
- Residence: Metro Atlanta, U.S.
- Children: 3, including PJ
- Occupation: Pastor, author, Gospel singer, musician, speaker

Paul Sylvester Morton Sr. (born July 30, 1950) is an American Baptist pastor, Gospel singer and author. He is also a founder of the Full Gospel Baptist Church Fellowship and the father of musician PJ Morton.

== Biography ==
Born into a Christian family, his father—Bishop C.L. Morton Sr.—pastored two Church of God in Christ congregations: one in Windsor, Ontario and the other in Detroit, Michigan.

In 1972, Morton moved to New Orleans, Louisiana and to the Greater St. Stephen Missionary Baptist Church (now known as Greater St. Stephen Full Gospel Baptist Church) under the pastorate of Reverend Percy Simpson, where he became an associate pastor. Upon his ascension to the senior pastorate, Morton introduced Pentecostal and Charismatic elements to the church.

Shortly after his appointment as senior pastor of Greater St. Stephen, Morton married the former Debra Brown. Together they have three children: Jasmine, Paul Jr., and Christian. His son Paul Jr. later became a Grammy Award-winning musician under the name PJ Morton.

During his pastorate at Greater St. Stephen Full Gospel Baptist Church, Morton established the Full Gospel Baptist Church Fellowship which initially began as a Charismatic Baptist movement within the National Baptist Convention, USA. The movement became its own separate denomination in 1994 after Morton and those affiliated with the fellowship "were lovingly advised to resign their posts with the NBCUSA before they were kicked out." National Baptist leadership feared the movement would develop into a separate denomination, urging members to either remain within the convention or leave.

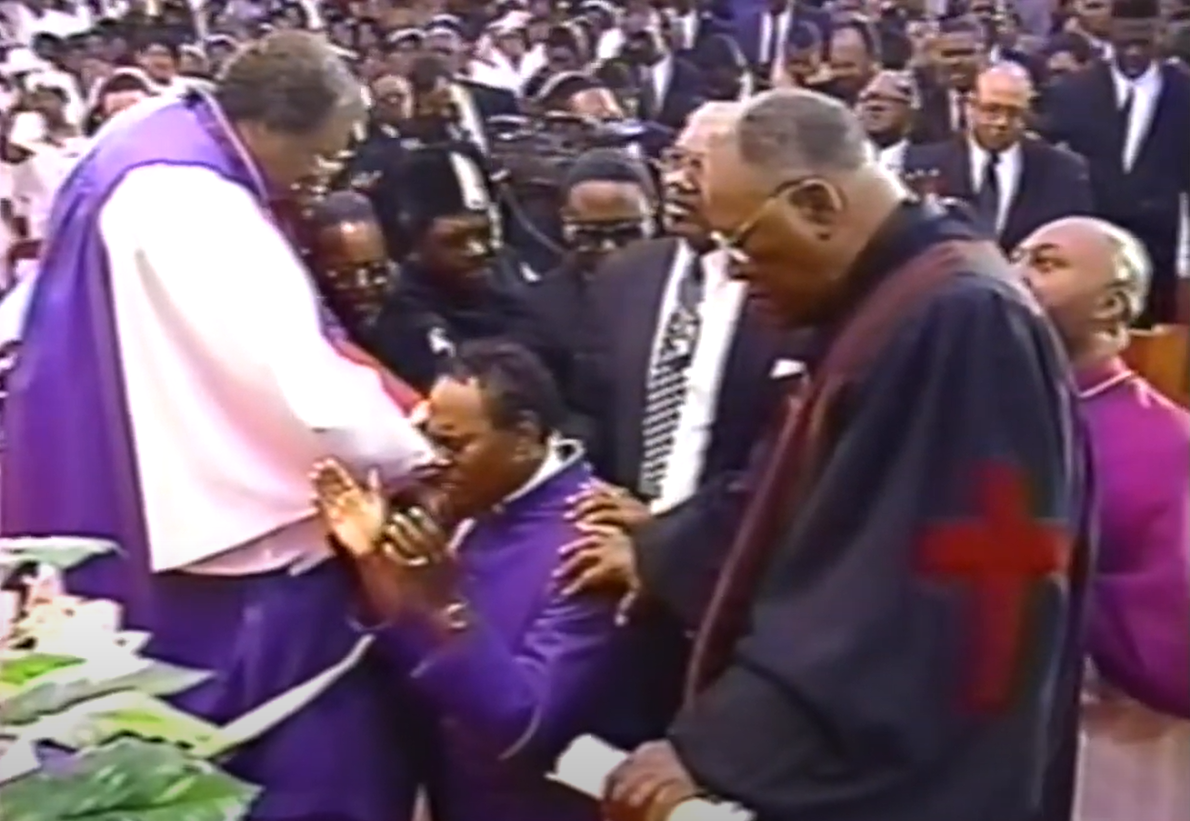
Consecration of Paul Morton into the episcopacy, March 1993

Morton was co-consecrated into the episcopacy in March 1993 by Independent Catholic episcopus vagans George Augustus Stallings of the African-American Catholic Congregation in New Orleans (Stalling had been previously repudiated by his chief consecrator in 1991); and by 1997, Greater St. Stephen grew to 18,000 members in 3 locations under his pastorate. Prior, in 1962 and at the age of 20, his brother C.L. Morton Jr. was consecrated as a bishop for the Church of God in Christ, and he was the chief consecrator in 1993.

In November 1993, Paul Morton—along with J. Delano Ellis, Wilbert Sterling McKinley and Roy E. Brown—established the Joint College of African-American Pentecostal Bishops.

In 2005, Morton founded Changing A Generation Full Gospel Baptist Church in Metro Atlanta.

In 2013, he announced his intent to retire as Presiding Bishop of the Full Gospel Baptist Church Fellowship. Two years later, in 2015, he retired from his office as leader of Full Gospel.

== See also ==
- Clarence Leslie Morton Jr., brother of Paul S. Morton
