= CeCe Winans discography =

- Studio albums: 14
- Live albums: 2
- Compilation albums: 4

CeCe Winans is an American gospel singer. She has sold 19 million records in the United States and over 27 million records worldwide with 15 Grammy Awards, 23 Dove Awards, and 16 Stellar Awards. Furthermore, Winans is an inaugural inductee in the Gospel Music Hall of Fame and has stars on the Hollywood Walk of Fame and Nashville Music City Walk of Fame. She is the best-selling and most-awarded female gospel artist of all time.

In 1996, "Count On Me", a duet with Whitney Houston from the Waiting to Exhale: Original Soundtrack Album, peaked at number 8 on the US Billboard Hot 100, becoming one of the best-selling singles of the year with a ranking of number 48 on the year-end chart. It was certified Gold by the Recording Industry Association of America on May 1, 1996, selling 800,000 US units as of January 1997. The song also reached No. 12 on the UK Singles Chart and within the top 40 in Austria, Iceland, the Netherlands, New Zealand, and Switzerland. Since then it has sold 2 million units.

Beginning with her solo debut, Alone in His Presence (1995), Winans has topped the US Top Gospel Albums chart seven times, with Alabaster Box (1999) spending 20 weeks at number-one and being one of five albums certified Gold by the RIAA, including her debut which was also certified Double Platinum. She also has accumulated six top 10 hits on the US Top Gospel Songs chart, including "Pray" and "Believe for It", which reached No. 1; the latter holding that position for a total of 12 weeks.

== Albums ==
=== Studio albums ===
List of studio albums, with selected chart positions
Title	Album details	Peak chart positions					Sales	Certifications (sales threshold)
Title	Album details	US	US R&B /HH	US Gospel	US Christ.	UK Christ. & Gospel	Sales	Certifications (sales threshold)
Alone in His Presence	Released: September 28, 1995; Label: Sparrow Records (#SPD 1441)	124	—	2	2	—		RIAA: Platinum
Everlasting Love	Released: March 17, 1998; Label: Pioneer Music Group / Atlantic (#92793)	107	35	1	2	—		
His Gift	Released: September 15, 1998; Label: Pioneer Music Group / Atlantic (#92810)	— (Note: His Gift did not enter the US Billboard 200, but peaked at number 27 on the Top Holiday Albums chart.)	—	3	17	—		
Alabaster Box	Released: October 19, 1999; Label: WellSpring Gospel / Sparrow (#51711)	129	55	1	5	—		RIAA: Gold
CeCe Winans	Released: Jun 19, 2001; Label: WellSpring Gospel / Sparrow (#51826)	116	48	2	2	—		RIAA: Gold
Throne Room	Released: September 9, 2003; Label: PureSprings Gospel / INO Records / Epic Records (#90361)	32	21	1	1	—	US: 384,000	RIAA: Gold
Purified	Released: September 13, 2005 (#93997); Label: PureSprings Gospel / INO / Epic	41	12	1	3	—	US: 129,000	
Thy Kingdom Come	Released: April 1, 2008; Label: PureSprings Gospel / EMI Gospel (#849662)	57	1	1	1	—		
Let Them Fall in Love	Released: February 3, 2017; Label: PureSprings Gospel / Thirty Tigers (#PSG 001)	103	—	1	—	10		
Something's Happening! A Christmas Album	Released: October 19, 2018; Label: PureSprings Gospel (#PSG 002)	— (Note: Something's Happening! A Christmas Album did not enter the US Billboard 200, but peaked at number 42 on the Top Holiday Albums chart.)	—	—	—	—		
Joyful, Joyful: A Christmas Album	Released: October 25, 2024; Label: PureSprings Gospel (#85959)	— (Note: Joyful, Joyful: A Christmas Album did not enter the US Billboard 200, but peaked at number 50 on the Top Holiday Albums chart.)	—	7	—	—		
The Hymns	Released: June 5, 2026; Label: PureSprings Gospel	—	—	1	12	—		
"—" denotes a recording that did not chart.

=== Live albums ===
List of live albums, with selected chart positions
Title	Album details	Peak chart positions			
Title	Album details	US	US Gospel	US Christ.	UK Christ. & Gospel
Believe for It	Released: March 12, 2021; Label: PureSprings Gospel / Fair Trade Services (#185669)	—	1	3	11
More Than This	Released: April 26, 2024; Label: PureSprings Gospel (#858993)	196	1	1	8

=== Compilation albums ===
List of compilation albums, with selected chart positions
Title	Album details	Peak chart positions	Sales
Title	Album details	US Gospel	Sales
For Always: The Best of CeCe Winans	Released: September 28, 2010; Label: PureSprings Gospel / EMI Gospel (#94725)	17	
Songs of Emotional Healing	Released: May 18, 2010; Label: Puresprings Gospel/EMI Gospel (#31108)	5	
Icon	Released: March 12, 2013; Label: Capitol Records, Sparrow (#126552 B)	—	US: 6,962
20th Century Masters : The Millennium Collection: The Best of CeCe Winans	Released: July 31, 2015 (#B002321902); Label: Sparrow, Universal	19	

=== Other albums ===
Title	Type	Album details	Peak chart positions
Title	Type	Album details	US Gospel
CeCe Winans Presents the Born Again Church Choir	Studio	Released: October 7, 2003; Label: Chordant (#83869)	—
CeCe Winans Presents Kingdom Kidz	Studio	Released: June 19, 2007; Label: EMI Christian Music Group (#855430)	—
CeCe Winans Presents Pure Worship	Studio	Released: 2008; Label: EMI Christian Music Group (#726838787325)	42

== Singles ==
=== As a lead artist ===
Title	Year	Peak chart positions										Certifications	Album
Title	Year	US	US Gospel	US Adult R&B	US R&B /HH	AUT	GER	NLD	NZ	SWI	UK	Certifications	Album
"Count on Me" (with Whitney Houston)	1996	8	—	1	7	28	75	30	26	31	12	RIAA: Platinum	Waiting to Exhale: Original Soundtrack Album
"Well, Alright"	1998	— (Note: "Well, Alright" did not enter the US Billboard Hot 100, but peaked at number 9 on the Bubbling Under Hot 100 chart.)	—	12	47	—	—	—	—	—	—		Everlasting Love
"More than What I Wanted"	2001	—	—	9	65	—	—	—	—	—	—		CeCe Winans
"Anybody Wanna Pray"	2001	—	—	27	—	—	—	—	—	—	—		CeCe Winans
"Pray"	2005	—	1	—	—	—	—	—	—	—	—		Purified
"All That I Need"	2005	—	—	—	—	—	—	—	—	—	—		Purified
"He's Concerned"	2005	—	11	—	—	—	—	—	—	—	—		Purified
"You Are Loved"	2006	—	—	38	—	—	—	—	—	—	—		Purified
"Let Everything that Has Breath"	2006	— (Note: "Let Everything that Hath Breath" did not enter the US Billboard Hot 100, but peaked at number 8 on the Dance Club Songs chart.)	—	—	—	—	—	—	—	—	—		Purified
"Waging War"	2008	—	12	—	—	—	—	—	—	—	—		Thy Kingdom Come
"More"	2010	—	30	—	—	—	—	—	—	—	—		For Always – The Best of CeCe Winans
"Never Have to Be Alone"	2016	—	4	26	—	—	—	—	—	—	—		Let Them Fall in Love
"Hey Devil!" (with The Clark Sisters)	2016	—	22	—	—	—	—	—	—	—	—		Let Them Fall in Love
"Lowly"	2017	—	—	—	—	—	—	—	—	—	—		Let Them Fall in Love
"Hark! The Herald Angels Sing"	2018	—	—	—	—	—	—	—	—	—	—		Something's Happening! A Christmas Album
"It's Christmas"	2018	—	—	—	—	—	—	—	—	—	—		Something's Happening! A Christmas Album
"Never Lost"	2020	—	2	—	—	—	—	—	—	—	—		Believe for It
"Believe for It"	2021	— (Note: "Believe for It" did not enter the US Billboard Hot 100, but peaked at number 49 on the Digital Song Sales chart.)	1	—	—	—	—	—	—	—	—	RIAA: Gold	Believe for It
"Believe for It (Eu Creio)" (with Gabriela Rocha)	2022	—	24	—	—	—	—	—	—	—	—		—N/a
"The Blood" (with Vestal Goodman)	2023	—	—	—	—	—	—	—	—	—	—		Vestal & Friends II
"I've Got Joy"	2023	—	11	—	—	—	—	—	—	—	—		Believe for It
"My Tribute (To God Be The Glory)" (with Natalie Grant)	2023	—	— (Note: "My Tribute (To God Be The Glory)" did not enter the US Billboard Hot Gospel Songs chart, but peaked at number 4 on the Gospel Digital Song Sales chart.)	—	—	—	—	—	—	—	—		Seasons
"Holy Forever"	2023	—	5	—	—	—	—	—	—	—	—		More Than This
"What Are We Waiting For?" (with For King & Country)	2023	—	—	—	—	—	—	—	—	—	—		—N/a
"That's My King"	2024	—	1	—	—	—	—	—	—	—	—		More Than This
"Come Jesus Come"	2024	— (Note: "Come Jesus Come" did not enter the US Billboard Hot 100, but peaked at number 2 on the Digital Song Sales chart.)	1	—	—	—	—	—	—	—	—	RIAA: Gold	More Than This
"Holy Forever" (with Bethel Music and Jenn Johnson)	2024	—	16	—	—	—	—	—	—	—	—		—N/a
"Joy to the World"	2024	—	6	—	—	—	—	—	—	—	—		Joyful, Joyful: A Christmas Album
"It's Christmas"	2024	—	— (Note: "It's Christmas" did not enter the US Billboard Hot Gospel Songs chart, but peaked at number 22 on the Hot Christian Songs.)	—	—	—	—	—	—	—	—		Joyful, Joyful: A Christmas Album
"Oh My Soul (Psalm 103)" (with tobyMac)	2025	—	7	—	—	—	—	—	—	—	—		Heaven on My Mind
"I Know a Name" (with Brandon Lake)	2025	—	— (Note: "I Know a Name" did not enter the US Billboard Hot Gospel Songs chart, but peaked at number 5 on the Hot Christian Songs.)	—	—	—	—	—	—	—	—		King of Hearts
"At the Cross"	2025	—	9	—	—	—	—	—	—	—	—		The Hymns
"The First Noel"	2025	—	2	—	—	—	—	—	—	—	—		The Hymns
"Lean on Me"	2025	—	12	—	—	—	—	—	—	—	—		Non-album singles
"Worthy of It All (Worthy)"	2026	—	1	—	—	—	—	—	—	—	—		Non-album singles
"What a Friend We Have in Jesus"	2026	—	16	—	—	—	—	—	—	—	—		The Hymns
"—" denotes items that were not released in that country or failed to chart.

=== As a featured artist ===
Title	Year	Peak chart positions			Album
Title	Year	US Digital	US Christ.	US Adult R&B	Album
"Tonight Tonight" (BeBe Winans featuring CeCe Winans)	2000	—	—	32	Love and Freedom
"Great Is Thy Faithfulness" (Carrie Underwood featuring CeCe Winans)	2021	—	27	—	My Savior
"Testimony" (Terrian featuring CeCe Winans)	2026	20	18	—	Mad Big World
"—" denotes items that were not released in that country or failed to chart.

== Other charted and certified songs ==
Title	Year	Peak chart positions				Certifications	Album
Title	Year	US	US Gospel	US Christ.	NGA Gospel	Certifications	Album
"Do You Hear What I Hear?"	1998	—	— (Note: "Do You Hear What I Hear?" did not enter the US Billboard Hot Gospel Songs chart, but peaked at number 24 on the Gospel Digital Song Sales chart.)	—	—		His Gift
"He's Never Failed Me Yet"	2017	—	— (Note: "He's Never Failed Me Yet" did not enter the US Billboard Hot Gospel Songs chart, but peaked at number 21 on the Gospel Digital Song Sales chart.)	—	—		Let Them Fall in Love
"No Greater"	2021	—	— (Note: "No Greater" did not enter the US Billboard Hot Gospel Songs chart, but peaked at number 13 on the Gospel Digital Song Sales chart.)	—	—		Believe for It
"Goodness of God"	2022	— (Note: "Goodness of God" did not enter the US Billboard Hot 100, but peaked at number 46 on the Digital Song Sales chart.)	2	6	13	RIAA: Platinum	Believe for It
"Worthy of It All"	2023	—	10	28	—		Believe for It
"Worthy"	2024	—	21	—	—		More Than This
"More Than This" (featuring Todd Dulaney)	2024	—	12	—	—		More Than This
"We Pray"	2024	—	16	—	—		More Than This
"I Heard the Bells on Christmas"	2025	—	—	— (Note: "I Heard the Bells on Christmas" did not enter the Billboard Hot Christian Songs chart, but peaked at number 24 on the Christian Airplay chart.)	—		Joyful, Joyful: A Christmas Album
"Feliz Navidad / O Holy Night"	2025	—	—	— (Note: "Feliz Navidad / O Holy Night" did not enter the Billboard Hot Christian Songs, but peaked at number 20 on the Christian Airplay chart.)	—		Joyful, Joyful: A Christmas Album
"Jesus Paid It All" (with Tommee Profitt)	2026	—	13	—	—		The Resurrection of a King
"Blessed Assurance"	2026	—	22	—	—		The Hymns
"Amazing Grace"	2026	—	10	—	—		The Hymns
"—" denotes items that were not released in that country or failed to chart.

== Guest appearances and soundtracks ==
- 1994: "Rest in Me" Coram Deo II: People of Praise (Sparrow)
- 1996: "Count On Me" with Whitney Houston Waiting to Exhale (Arista Records)
- 1996: "Take Me Back" Tribute: The Songs of Andrae Crouch (Warner Alliance)
- 1995: "All Is Well Tonight" Mother and Child (I.R.S. Records)
- 1998: "The River" The Prince of Egypt (Inspirational) (DreamWorks Records)
- 1998: "Humanity" The Prince of Egypt Soundtrack (DreamWorks)
- 2000: "Tonight Tonight" BeBe Winans (featuring CeCe) (Motown)
- 2006: "He Set My Life to Music" Barbara Mandrell She Was Country When Country Wasn't Cool (BNA)
- 2006: "Walking Away" The Gospel According to Patti LaBelle (Umbrella)
- 2008: "Right Now (We Need Another)" BeBe & CeCe Winans with Vince Gill and Wynonna Judd (Zomba Recording)
