= Songs of Emotional Healing =

Compilation album by CeCe Winans
- Released: May 18, 2010
- Length: 35:02
- Label: Puresprings Gospel; EMI Gospel

CeCe Winans chronology
For Always... The Best of CeCe Winans (2010)	Songs of Emotional Healing (2010)	Icon (2013)

Songs of Emotional Healing is the second compilation album by CeCe Winans released in 2010 through Puresprings Gospel and EMI Gospel. The songs are from past albums "full of encouragement, comfort, healing and love to lift all those who are feeling down for whatever reason".

== Critical reception ==
Professional ratings
Review scores
Source	Rating
AllMusic	3.5/5 stars

William Ruhlmann of AllMusic wrote:

"The all-ballad collection is devoted to offering spiritual support for the emotionally battered, and Winans starts at the bottom with "It's Gonna Get Better," a song intended to dissuade potential suicides. "Please don't throw your life away," she implores, "Joy will come." [Her] vocal similarity to Michael Jackson, who died in the year preceding this album's release, gives the song a disconcerting element that is unintended but hard to ignore...Strangely, the album then concludes with "Comforter," which is sung to God and makes it sound like He is offering comfort to the survivors of someone who has died. Maybe [she] is simply covering all her bases; if she can't stop a suicide, at least she and her God can move on to the survivors and deal with them. Of course, there's not really that much rational thought behind the album's songs; the point is that God is here to help, and [she] is here to convey His message in her soothing voice."

== Track listing ==
1. "It's Gonna Get Better" (from CeCe Winans) (4:03)
2. "The Healing Part" (from Everlasting Love) (4:02)
3. "What About You" (4:18)
4. "You are Loved" (from Purified) (6:03)
5. "He's Concerned" (3:25)
6. "His Strength is Perfect" (from Alone in His Presence) (4:38)
7. "He's Always There" (from Relationships/Alone in His Presence) (3:47)
8. "Comforter" (from Alabaster Box) (4:41)

== Charts ==
Chart performance for Songs of Emotional Healing
Chart (2010)	Peak position
US Top Gospel Albums (Billboard)	5
