= David Taylor =

David or Dave Taylor may refer to:

== Entertainment ==
- David G. Taylor, producer and director for the BBC
- D. J. Taylor (writer) (born 1960), British novelist and biographer
- Dave Taylor (comics) (1964–2025), British comic book creator
- Dave Taylor (bass guitarist) (born 1953), Canadian bassist for Bryan Adams
- Dave Taylor (trombonist) (born 1944), American trombonist
- Switch (songwriter), also known as Dave Taylor, London house producer
- David Taylor (Home and Away), fictional character in the Australian soap opera Home and Away
- David J. Taylor, American visual artist, awarded a 2008 Guggenheim Fellowship
- David Taylor (actor) in The Adventures of the Black Stallion
- David Taylor (writer), winner of the Keats-Shelley Prize for Poetry
- David Taylor (editor) (1947–2001), British humorist
- David A. Taylor (born 1961), American author and filmmaker

== Politics ==
- David Taylor (Green politician) (born 1957), Green Party politician
- David Taylor (North West Leicestershire MP) (1946–2009), Labour Party politician
- David Taylor (Ohio politician) (born 1969), member of the U.S. House of Representatives
- David Taylor (Hemel Hempstead MP), Labour Party politician
- David Taylor (Washington politician) (born 1972), member of the Washington House of Representatives
- David G. P. Taylor (1933–2007), Chief Executive of the Falklands Islands and Governor of Montserrat
- David James Taylor (1889–1969), Ontario politician
- Dave Taylor (Canadian politician) (born 1953), Alberta politician
- David Taylor (New Zealand diplomat) on List of ambassadors of New Zealand to South Korea
- David Taylor, husband of Joani Reid

== Sports ==
=== Football and rugby ===
- David Taylor (American football) (born 1949), American football player
- David Taylor (football administrator) (1954–2014), General Secretary of UEFA
- David Taylor (footballer, born 1884) (1884–1949), Scottish football player and manager, FA Cup winner with Bradford City in 1911 and 1914 with Burnley
- David Taylor (footballer, born 1889) (1889–1946), English footballer for Darlington, Heart of Midlothian and Bristol Rovers
- David Taylor (Welsh footballer) (born 1965), Welsh football player, European Golden Shoe winner
- David Taylor (rugby union, born 1944) (born 1944), Australian rugby union player
- David Taylor (rugby union, born 1880) (1880–1941), Irish rugby union player
- Dave Taylor (footballer, born 1940) (1940–2017), English footballer for Gillingham, Portsmouth, Yeovil Town, Bath City and Cheltenham Town
- Dave Taylor (New Zealand footballer) (20th century), New Zealand soccer player
- Dave Taylor (Thames Ironworks F.C. founder) (19th century), football administrator
- Dave Taylor (rugby league) (born 1988), Australian rugby league footballer
- D. J. Taylor (soccer) (born 1997), American soccer player
- David Taylor (Canadian football) in 1986 CFL draft
- David Taylor (Nicaragua footballer) in 1997 UNCAF Nations Cup

=== Other sports ===
- David Taylor (Australian cricketer) (1881–?)
- David Taylor (chess player) (born 1941), International Correspondence Chess Federation United States champion
- David Taylor (English cricketer) (born 1974)
- David Taylor (snooker player) (born 1943), snooker player
- David Taylor (wrestler, born 1990), American freestyle wrestler, Tokyo 2020 Olympic gold medalist at 86 kg
- Dave Taylor (ice hockey) (born 1955), retired professional hockey player
- Dave Taylor (wrestler) (born 1957), English pro wrestler
- David Taylor (athlete) in 1995 European Cross Country Championships
- David Taylor (basketball), former college player for Hofstra University
- David Taylor (ice hockey), played in 2007 Memorial Cup
- David Taylor (swimmer), participated in Swimming at the 2012 Summer Paralympics – Men's 50 metre freestyle S9

== Others ==
- David Taylor (professor) (born 1963), British professor of psychiatry and author of the Maudsley Prescribing Guidelines
- David Taylor (banker) (1929–2009), banker
- David Taylor (veterinary surgeon) (1934–2013), television presenter on animal subjects
- David Taylor (Wisconsin judge) (1818–1891), American jurist and legislator
- David Dallas Taylor (1926–1983), 1953 FBI Most Wanted Fugitives
- David E. Taylor (born 1972), President of Joshua Media Ministries
- David S. Taylor (born 1958), CEO of Procter and Gamble
- David W. Taylor (1864–1940), U.S. Navy admiral and engineer
- Dave Taylor (game programmer), game programmer formerly employed by id Software
- David Taylor (programmer) on World Rugby
- David Taylor, a co-founder of the grocery that became Waitrose
