= Believe for It =

Believe for It may refer to:

- Believe for It (album), a 2021 live album by CeCe Winans
  - "Believe for It" (song), a 2021 song by CeCe Winans, title track of the album
