= Never Lost =

2019 song by Elevation Worship

Single by Elevation Worship
- Released: November 1, 2019
- Genre: Contemporary worship music
- Length: 5:15
- Label: Elevation Worship Records
- Songwriters: Chris Brown; Steven Furtick; Tiffany Hammer
- Producer: Aaron Robertson

Elevation Worship singles chronology
| "See a Victory" (2019) | "Never Lost" (2019) | "Impresionante" (2020) |

Music videos
- "Never Lost" (Lyrics) on YouTube
- "Never Lost" (Backroom Sessions) on YouTube

"Never Lost" is a song performed by American contemporary worship band Elevation Worship released as a standalone single, on November 1, 2019. The song was written by Chris Brown, Steven Furtick, and Tiffany Hammer. Chris Brown and Aaron Robertson handled the production of the single.

"Never Lost" debuted at No. 36 on the US Hot Christian Songs chart. Elevation Worship also released a live version of the song which featured Tauren Wells on their live album, Graves into Gardens (2020). This version of the song peaked at No. 31 on the Hot Christian Songs chart.

The song was notably covered by CeCe Winans, who released her version of the song on September 4, 2020, as the lead single to her live album, Believe for It (2021). CeCe Winan's single peaked at No. 2 on the Hot Gospel Songs chart. CeCe Winans' rendition of "Never Lost" was nominated for the GMA Dove Award Contemporary Gospel Recorded Song of the Year at the 2021 GMA Dove Awards. It won the Grammy Award for Best Gospel Performance/Song at the 2022 Grammy Awards.

== Background ==
Elevation Worship released "Never Lost" as a standalone single, on November 1, 2019. Chris Brown spoke of the song, saying:

When we look through Scripture, we see that God's never been intimidated by a battle his children were facing. The walls of Jericho fell. Lazarus got up from the grave. And we still worship the same Champion of Heaven who fights for us. We hope this song points you to His past faithfulness in your own life, and gives you strength for today.

== Composition ==
"Never Lost" is composed in the key of E♭ with a tempo of 61.5 beats per minute, and a musical time signature of 6/8.

== Commercial performance ==
"Never Lost" debuted at No. 36 on Billboard's Hot Christian Songs chart dated November 16, 2019. The song spent a total of eleven weeks on the Hot Christian Songs chart.

== Music videos ==
The lyric video of "Never Lost" was published on YouTube by Elevation Worship on May 1, 2020. On May 13, 2020, Elevation Worship released "Never Lost" Backroom Session performance video on their YouTube channel.

== Track listing ==
"Never Lost"
| No. | Title | Length |
|---|---|---|
| 1. | "Never Lost" | 5:15 |

Apple Music bonus content exclusive
| No. | Title | Length |
|---|---|---|
| 2. | "Never Lost" (lyric video) | 5:14 |
| Total length: | | 10:29 |

== Charts ==
Weekly chart performance for "Never Lost"
| Chart (2019–20) | Peak position |
|---|---|
| US Hot Christian Songs (Billboard) | 36 |

== Release history ==
| Region | Date | Format | Label | Ref. |
|---|---|---|---|---|
| Various | November 9, 2019 | Digital download; streaming | Elevation Worship Records | |

== Live version featuring Tauren Wells ==
"Never Lost (Live)"

Song by Elevation Worship featuring Tauren Wells

from the album Graves into Gardens
- Released: May 1, 2020
- Genre: Contemporary worship music
- Length: 6:50
- Label: Elevation Worship Records
- Songwriters: Chris Brown; Steven Furtick; Tiffany Hammer
- Producers: Chris Brown; Aaron Robertson

Music videos
- "Never Lost" (Live) on YouTube
- "Never Lost" (Lyrics) on YouTube

On May 1, 2020, Elevation Worship released the live version of "Never Lost" featuring Tauren Wells as part of their eighth live album, Graves into Gardens.

=== Composition ===
"Never Lost" is composed in the key of B with a tempo of 62 beats per minute, and a musical time signature of 6/8.

=== Commercial performance ===
The live version of "Never Lost" debuted at No. 31 on Billboard's Hot Christian Songs chart dated May 16, 2020. The song spent a total of twenty-one weeks on the Hot Christian Songs chart.

=== Music videos ===
The lyric video of the song was published on YouTube by Elevation Worship on May 1, 2020. On May 13, 2020, Elevation Worship released the live music video of "Never Lost" featuring Tauren Wells as the lead vocalist, recorded at Elevation Church's Ballantyne campus on their YouTube channel,

=== Charts ===
==== Weekly charts ====
Weekly chart performance for "Never Lost (featuring Tauren Wells)"
| Chart (2020) | Peak position |
|---|---|
| US Hot Christian Songs (Billboard) | 31 |

==== Year-end charts ====
Year-end chart performance for "Never Lost (featuring Tauren Wells)"
| Chart (2020) | Peak position |
|---|---|
| US Christian Songs (Billboard) | 94 |

== CeCe Winans version ==
"Never Lost"

Single by CeCe Winans

from the album Believe For It
- Released: September 4, 2020
- Genre: Urban contemporary gospel
- Length: 4:10
- Label: Puresprings Gospel
- Songwriters: Chris Brown; Steven Furtick; Tiffany Hammer
- Producer: Kyle Lee

CeCe Winans singles chronology
| "It's Christmas" (2018) | "Never Lost" (2020) | "Believe For It" (2021) |

Music videos
- "Never Lost" (Lyrics) on YouTube

On September 4, 2020, CeCe Winans released her rendition of "Never Lost" as the lead single to her live album, Believe For It (2021). Kyle Lee handled the production of the single. The recording was nominated for the 2021 NAACP Image Award for Outstanding Gospel/Christian Song. CeCe Winans' rendition of "Never Lost" was nominated for the GMA Dove Award Contemporary Gospel Recorded Song of the Year at the 2021 GMA Dove Awards. It also won a Grammy Award for Best Gospel Performance/Song at the 2022 Grammy Awards.

=== Composition ===
"Never Lost" is composed in the key of D with a tempo of 61.5 beats per minute, and a musical time signature of 6/8.

=== Commercial performance ===
CeCe Winans' rendition of "Never Lost" debuted at No. 20 on Billboard's Hot Gospel Songs chart dated September 19, 2020. The song spent a total of thirty-three weeks on the Hot Gospel Songs chart.

=== Music video ===
The lyric video of the song was published on YouTube by CeCe Winans on September 4, 2020. The video was directed by Calvin Nowell and Travis Flynn, and filmed at Rocketown, in Nashville, Tennessee.

=== Accolades ===
Awards
| Year | Organization | Award | Result | Ref |
|---|---|---|---|---|
| 2021 | NAACP Image Awards | Outstanding Gospel/Christian Song | Nominated | |
| 2021 | GMA Dove Awards | Contemporary Gospel Recorded Song of the Year | Nominated | |
| 2022 | Grammy Awards | Best Gospel Performance/Song | Won | |

=== Track listing ===
Never Lost
| No. | Title | Length |
|---|---|---|
| 1. | "Never Lost" | 4:10 |

"Never Lost" Apple Music bonus content
| No. | Title | Length |
|---|---|---|
| 2. | "Never Lost" (Lyric Video) | 4:11 |
| Total length: | | 8:21 |

=== Charts ===
==== Weekly charts ====
Weekly chart performance for "Never Lost" by CeCe Winans
| Chart (2020–21) | Peak position |
|---|---|
| US Gospel Songs (Billboard) | 2 |

==== Year-end charts ====
Year-end chart performance for "Never Lost" by CeCe Winans
| Chart (2021) | Position |
|---|---|
| US Gospel Songs (Billboard) | 32 |

=== Release history ===
| Region | Date | Format | Label | Ref. |
|---|---|---|---|---|
| Various | September 4, 2020 | Digital download; streaming | Puresprings Gospel | |

== Other versions ==
- Cain released a live performance version of the song as part of the Essential Worship Song Sessions series on YouTube.
