= Yohe =

Yohe is a surname. Notable people with the surname include:

- Andrew Yohe (born 1978), American sledge hockey player
- Bill Yohe (1878–1938), American baseball player
- Gary Yohe, American economist
- May Yohé (1866–1938), American actress
- Vicki Yohe (born 1965), American singer
