= David E. Taylor =

American religious leader and televangelist (born 1972)

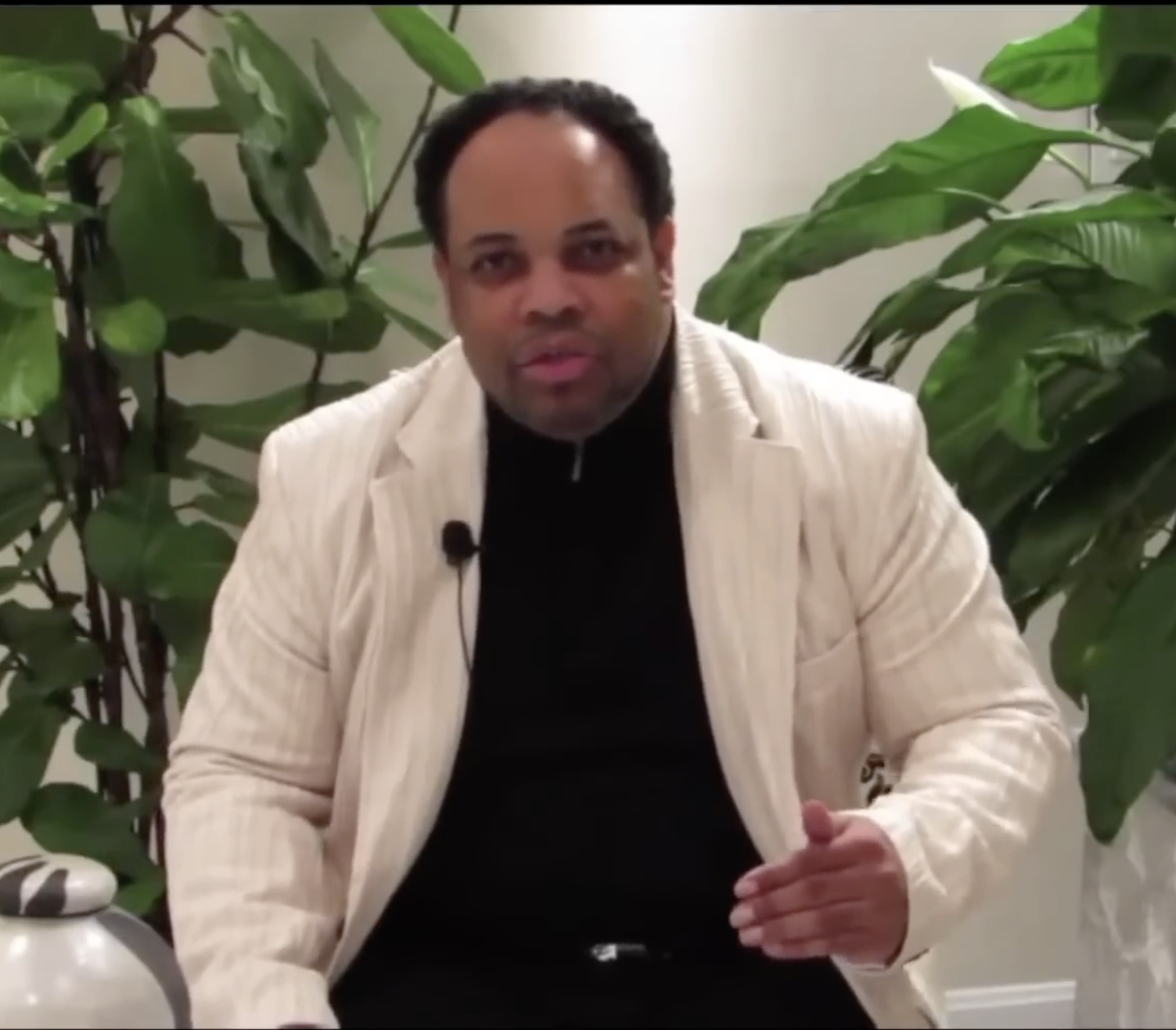
- Taylor in 2014

Personal life
- Born: August 3, 1972 (age 54) Memphis, Tennessee, United States
- Partner: None, divorced
- Children: 3
- Education: Johnson & Wales University
- Other name: "Apostle"

Religious life
- Religion: Christianity
- Denomination: Non-denominational Christianity
- Church: Joshua Media Ministries International, Kingdom of God Global Church
- Philosophy: Evangelicalism

David Edward Taylor (born August 3, 1972) is an American religious leader and televangelist who leads the Kingdom of God Global Church (KOGGC), formerly known as Joshua Media Ministries International (JMMI). Taylor, nicknamed 'The Apostle,' is known for his teachings on prosperity theology, faith healing and charismatic preaching, as well as his claims of receiving face-to-face revelations from Jesus Christ.

In August 2025, Taylor and KOGGC executive director Michelle Brannon were indicted by a federal grand jury on charges of forced labor, conspiracy, and money laundering. Federal prosecutors allege that the ministry operated a coercive scheme across multiple states, exploiting followers to generate approximately $50 million in donations. Taylor has pleaded not guilty and attributed the charges to racial bias. As of May 2026, he is in custody pending trial.

== Early life and education ==
David Edward Taylor was born and raised in Memphis, Tennessee, the seventh of nine children of Rev. James Houston Karl Taylor and Katie Mae Burford Taylor. He attended both Pentecostal and Baptist churches. Taylor has said that during his adolescent years, he became involved in what he refers to as a "worldly lifestyle" or "gang life."

Taylor's official biography from his ministry asserts that when he was 17, he had a vivid dream in which Jesus appeared to him "face to face." He claimed he was born again after the event, which inspired him to dedicate his life to Christian ministry. In 1992, Taylor graduated from Johnson & Wales University before pursuing ministry full time.

== Ministry ==
Taylor has been the president and CEO of JMMI, also referred to as Kingdom Family Church (KFC), Resurrection Media Ministries (RMM) and Kingdom of God Global Church (KOGGC), since 2008. According to IRS filings, the church and ministry's goal is to "spread the good word of Jesus Christ throughout the world." The ministry has locations in Taylor, Michigan; Houston, Texas; Tampa and Ocala, Florida; and Chesterfield, Eureka, and Wildwood, Missouri, which have functioned as both worship centers and call centers for fundraising and prayer lines.

Taylor's public ministry is based on his stated "face-to-face" dreams and visions of Jesus, which he presents as continual revelations that inform his teaching on national and global issues. In sermons and advertising materials, he has linked these experiences to claims of spiritual insight into world affairs, such as end-of-days prophecy and the fate of the United States. Taylor has associated himself with other charismatic and prophetic Christian leaders (i.e., Benny Hinn, Kathryn Kuhlman, Rod Parsley, and Terry MacAlmon) through conferences and media appearances over the years. He has been criticized for controversial statements, such as claiming to have raised a woman from the dead via Facebook.

In 2015, several videos of Taylor being deposed as a witness in the divorce proceedings of one of his parishioners gained widespread attention and went viral.

== Legal issues ==
In 2019, an investigation by The News-Herald claimed that Taylor's multimillion-dollar church in Taylor, Michigan, was "cult-like" and examined the pressure to make large donations. In 2021, Trinity Foundation and MinistryWatch reported that the IRS removed the 501(c)(3) tax-exempt status of JMMI while criticizing Taylor's fundraising methods and the use of luxurious real estate connected to the ministry. In 2020, gospel singer Vicki Yohe, who was previously in a relationship with Taylor, accused him of being a cult leader and sleeping with over 100 women.

On August 27, 2025, Taylor and his executive director, Michelle Brannon, were indicted and arrested as part of the FBI's Operation Divine Deception after a federal grand jury charged them with conspiracy to commit forced labor, forced labor, and money laundering. Prosecutors claim that beginning in 2013, followers working in call centers affiliated with JMMI and KOGGC in Michigan, Florida, Texas, and Missouri were subjected to restrictive conditions, including limited freedom of movement, long work hours, and threats of food and housing loss, while soliciting tens of millions of dollars in donations. According to court records, ministry-owned homes in Tampa and Ocala, Florida, served as both houses and worksites, with some workers, known as "armor bearers," living in cramped garage or dormitory-style spaces.

Federal documents and news reports additionally report that investigators are gathering evidence of sexual exploitation, including claims that Taylor asked women connected to the ministry for sexually explicit pictures and videos and used his spiritual authority in ways that prosecutors say were coercive. Asset-forfeiture actions are seeking to seize cash, gold, cars, and real estate, including an $8.3 million property in Tampa, on the grounds that they can be traced back to the alleged scheme of forced labor and money laundering. Taylor has pleaded not guilty and denied the charges through his lawyer and public statements, calling the case unfair and based on bias. He was denied bond. As of May 2026, a trial date has yet to be set in federal court.

On February 12, 2026, 'Prophetess' Kathleen Klein was arrested and charged with conspiracy to commit forced labor, the third person to be indicted in the conspiracy.

== Publications ==
- Taylor, David E. (2009). Face-to-Face Appearances from Jesus: The Ultimate Intimacy. Shippensburg, Pennsylvania, United States: Destiny Image. ISBN 9780768431476.
- Taylor, David E. (2011). My Trip To Heaven: Face To Face With Jesus. Shippensburg, Pennsylvania, United States: Destiny Image. ISBN 9780768436549.
