= Joshua Media Ministries =

Christian evangelical ministry

JMMI/KOGGC Ministry Houses, Call Centers, and Churches
1 NORTHEASTERN HEADQUARTERS - 20320 Superior Road, Taylor, Michigan

Joshua Media Ministries International (JMMI), also known as Kingdom of God Global Church (KOGGC) and Kingdom Family Church (KFC), is a ministry and church based in St. Louis, Missouri, and Taylor, Michigan. The ministry has been operating since 2007 under President and CEO David E. Taylor.

Former members have described the organization as a cult, and Taylor has faced accusations of sexual misconduct as well as criticism for his extravagant lifestyle and high-profile real estate purchases. Taylor, however, denies these allegations, claiming they are a racially motivated social media smear campaign.

Taylor claims that his ministerial efforts have "resulted in entire drug rings being dismantled, sex-slave trafficking being broken, blinded eyes opening, deaf ears hearing, the lame walking, and the dead being brought back to life." The church has released a video of a member claiming that Taylor raised her from the dead. He also claims to have met Jesus Christ face-to-face and to be able to instruct his followers to share that experience.

On August 27, 2025, Taylor and executive director Michelle Brannon were arrested in North Carolina and Florida on federal charges of forced labor, conspiracy to commit forced labor, and conspiracy to commit money laundering.

== History ==
Missouri business records indicate that entities using the Joshua Media name were first incorporated in the state in 2007, with Joshua Media Ministries International organized the following year; these early corporations were later administratively dissolved.

The ministry subsequently adopted and used the alternative names Kingdom of God Global Church (KOGGC) and Kingdom Family Church (KFC) in its branding and public-facing materials. Its primary headquarters and mailing address are in Taylor, Michigan, and by the early 2020s, the organization reported or was reported to maintain ministry or call-center operations in Taylor, Michigan; Houston, Texas; Tampa and Ocala, Florida; and Chesterfield, Eureka, and Wildwood, Missouri.

== Controversies ==
Former members of KOGGC have accused the church of physical, financial, and sexual abuse, including aggressive fundraising quotas, sleep deprivation, welfare fraud, and blackmail. Neighbors to the church's residential properties have reported heavy security and surveillance presence; city officials in Chesterfield, Missouri, have cited the church for operating commercial enterprises in residential zones, and various Michigan police departments have reported frequent visits to the church's main office and residential facilities for wellness checks, missing-persons reports, mental health commitments, and a 2017 bomb threat.

Other former members, including gospel singer Vicki Yohe and Taylor's ex-wife Tabitha Taylor, claim that Taylor uses his position in the church to lure women into sexual relationships, including married members of his congregation. Yohe's account of her relationship with Taylor included lavish gifts when the relationship was going well and threats of revenge porn and being cursed with cancer when it was going poorly.

One member of the church donated over $1 million. In a subsequent divorce proceeding, Taylor was subpoenaed for a videotaped deposition to detail his church's spending. In the deposition, he described a $2.8 million residence in the St. Louis area, three luxury vehicles (including a limousine), and a 2013–2014 clothing budget of approximately $30,000. He explained the clothing expenditures as due to his frequent travel and "sweating through all [his] clothes."

Ministry Watch rates Joshua Media Ministries an 'F' ("Withhold Giving") for its lack of financial transparency, with a score of 12/100 for donor confidence.

== Real-estate purchases ==
In 2015, Taylor announced plans to purchase the St. Louis-area Jamestown Mall for redevelopment as a religious complex, including a hotel, sports arena, office space, and convention center. He claimed that he had a $10 million donation from Karlos Dansby and $400 million in financing arranged, along with a contract to purchase the property from Macy's for $1 million. Dansby denied that he had made or pledged the donation, and the church was unable to begin either the site purchase or redevelopment. Instead, St. Louis County transferred the property to its port authority in 2017.

Taylor unsuccessfully sued St. Louis County, claiming that it had undermined his efforts with slow approvals, and Macy's, for reneging on the alleged purchase agreement. In October 2025, the mall was demolished after nearly 10 years of vacancy.

In 2021, KOGGC purchased an abandoned 10,000-square-foot mansion in Wildwood, Missouri owned by the rapper Nelly. At the time, the Church also owned a nearby five-bedroom, nine-bathroom house in nearby Chesterfield. It claimed that these homes were intended for use in a drug and alcohol rehabilitation program.

In 2022, the Church also purchased an $8.3 million estate from Tampa Bay Buccaneers co-owner Darcie Glazer Kassewitz in Tampa, Florida's Avila neighborhood. The estate included a 28,893-square-foot main house and a 2,620-square-foot guest house.
