= Shepherds for Sale =

2024 book by Megan Basham

- Author: Megan Basham
- Publisher: HarperCollins
- Publication date: 2024
- Pages: 352

Shepherds for Sale: How Evangelical Leaders Traded the Truth for a Leftist Agenda is a 2024 book by Megan Basham, published by HarperCollins. In it Basham argues that evangelical leaders (especially in the Southern Baptist Convention) have been promoting left-wing views on issues such as climate change, illegal immigration, abortion, COVID-19, critical race theory, and the #MeToo movement. The book asserts that "evangelical elites" have betrayed Christian positions on these issues in order to curry favor with a more mainstream cultural elite. Shepherds for Sale sparked controversy upon its publication.

The book was criticized for its inaccuracies. A number of people mentioned in the book have publicly contested its assertions. J. D. Greear, for example, wrote that the book's reporting "is neither careful nor charitable, and in many places, demonstrably untrue, as even the simplest of internet searches reveals." Warren Cole Smith, writing for The Dispatch, suggested that the book was not journalism but propaganda, while Rick Pidcock of Baptist News Global said that Basham "resorts to lies and conspiracy theories to make her case."

According to Smith, the "fundamental flaw" of Basham's book is that "corrupting money is not on the evangelical left, as she claims, but on the populist right." Pidcock went further and wrote, "the bigger story is how Basham and the evangelicals who support her book are actually the wolves in bed with billionaires." Smith went on to suggest that the book "has many villains, but it has only one true hero: Donald J. Trump. He is mentioned more than 30 times in the book, all positively or defensively." Smith argued that Shepherds for Sale "purports to fight for the Gospel against heretics, but Basham is waging a proxy war, defending Trump against his evangelical critics."

Conversely, "proponents have rallied around the text as a battle cry." Supporters of the book included Tom Ascol, Doug Wilson, and Eric Metaxas. Daniel Gullotta, writing for National Review, suggests that the book "mirrors the growing divisions within the church."

Thomas Creedy, writing for Premier Christianity, notes that Shepherds for Sale "is a political book more than a religious one."
