= MarriageToday =

- Established: 1994; 31 years ago
- Founders: Jimmy and Karen Evans
- Headquarters: Grapevine, Texas, U.S.
- Official languages: English
- Website: www.marriagetoday.com

MarriageToday, formally known as XO Marriage, is a Christian nonprofit organization. It was established in April 1994 by Jimmy and Karen Evans.

A statement on the Evangelical Council for Financial Accountability (ECFA) website, submitted by MarriageToday, says its mission is "to produce, air and distribute religious and educational seminars, books, audiotapes, videotapes, radio and television programs, and literature to further the proclamation of the Gospel of Jesus Christ."

== Activities ==
MarriageToday produces the MarriageToday television show, which is broadcast on four networks: Daystar Television Network, Trinity Broadcasting Network (TBN), The Word Network, and the Christian Television Network (CTN). It also broadcasts on eight local channels.

MarriageToday conducts conferences and marriage seminars, and offers various books, CDs and DVDs, mostly produced by Jimmy and Karen Evans.

Their website provides a Christian marriage counselor locator page.

== Accreditation ==
Ministry Watch lists MarriageToday as a valid Christian ministry.

The ECFA website provides a detailed view of MarriageToday's finances. ECFA uses data provided by this organization. It shows for the 2011 year $1,612,131 was spent directly for MarriageToday's program. $2,358,264 was spent on administrative expenses and $241,899 was spent on fundraising. A deficit of $260,346 was posted for the year. ECFA shows MarriageToday had deficits for 2009 and 2010, as well.
