= I've Got Joy =

2022 song by CeCe Winans

Single by CeCe Winans

from the album Believe for It (Deluxe edition)
- Released: May 13, 2022
- Genre: Contemporary worship
- Length: 3:38
- Label: Puresprings Gospel; Fair Trade Services
- Songwriters: Phil Wickham; Kyle Lee
- Producer: Kyle Lee

CeCe Winans singles chronology
"Believe for It" (2021)	"I've Got Joy" (2022)

Music video
- "I've Got Joy" (Lyrics) on YouTube

"I've Got Joy" is a song by American gospel singer CeCe Winans, which was released on May 13, 2022, as the third single from her first live album, Believe for It (2021). The song was written by Kyle Lee and Phil Wickham.

"I've Got Joy" peaked at number 26 on the US Hot Christian Songs chart, and number 12 on the Hot Gospel Songs chart. At the 2022 GMA Dove Awards, "I've Got Joy" was nominated for the GMA Dove Award for Inspirational Recorded Song of the Year.

== Background ==
On April 1, 2022, CeCe Winans released the deluxe edition of Believe for It, containing additional studio versions of previously released songs and a new song titled "I've Got Joy." Wickham shared the story behind the song, saying:

The message is just so powerful. It's something the world needs to hear. People are experiencing a lot of sadness and heartbreak and we have to be reminded even as believers that what Jesus did on the cross gives us the ability to have joy, even in the midst of sorrow.

== Composition ==
"I've Got Joy" is composed in the key of D with a tempo of 87 beats per minute, and a musical time signature of 4/4.

== Accolades ==
Awards
Year	Organization	Award	Result	Ref
2022	GMA Dove Awards	Inspirational Recorded Song of the Year	Nominated	

== Commercial performance ==
After being released to Christian radio, "I've Got Joy" made its debut at number 50 on the US Christian Airplay chart dated June 4, 2022.

"I've Got Joy" debuted at number 42 on the US Hot Christian Songs chart dated July 9, 2022.

"I've Got Joy" debuted at number 19 on the US Hot Gospel Songs chart dated January 7, 2023.

== Music videos ==
On April 12, 2022, CeCe Winans released the official audio video for the song. On June 23, 2022, CeCe Winans released the official lyric video for "I've Got Joy".

== Charts ==
=== Weekly charts ===
Chart performance for "I've Got Joy"
Chart (2022–2023)	Peak position
US Hot Christian Songs (Billboard)	26
US Christian Airplay (Billboard)	21
US Christian AC (Billboard)	19
US Gospel Songs (Billboard)	11

=== Year-end charts ===
Year-end chart performance for "I've Got Joy"
Chart (2022)	Position
US Christian Songs (Billboard)	86
Chart (2023)	Position
US Gospel Songs (Billboard)	17

== Release history ==
Release history and formats for "I've Got Joy"
Region	Date	Format	Label	Ref.
United States	May 13, 2022	Christian radio	Fair Trade Services	
