= Something's Happening! A Christmas Album =

2018 Christmas album

Studio album by CeCe Winans
- Released: 2018
- Genre: Christmas music
- Length: 41:40
- Label: PureSprings Gospel
- Producer: Alvin Love III

CeCe Winans chronology
Let Them Fall in Love (2017)	Something's Happening! A Christmas Album (2018)	Believe for It (2021)

Something's Happening! A Christmas Album is the tenth studio album and second Christmas album by CeCe Winans released in 2018 through Puresprings Gospel after His Gift (1998).

== Track listing ==
All tracks written by Alvin Love III, except "I Heard the Bells on Christmas Day" and where noted.

No.	Title	Writer(s)	Length
1.	"Something's Happening"		4:53
2.	"This World Will Never Be the Same"		3:56
3.	"Giving Season"		2:54
4.	"The Grace of The Father"		3:39
5.	"O Come, O Come Emmanuel"	Traditional	4:32
6.	"Hark! The Herald Angels Sing"	Charles Wesley/Felix Mendelssohn/George Whitefield	3:22
7.	"I Heard the Bells on Christmas Day"		3:14
8.	"Feliz Navidad/O Holy Night"	José Feliciano/Traditional	5:27
9.	"It's Christmas"		4:56
10.	"Silent Night"	Franz Gruber/Joseph Mohr	3:32
11.	"Something's Happening (Reprise)"		1:11
Total length:			41:40

== Charts ==
Chart performance for Something's Happening! A Christmas Album
Chart (2018)	Peak position
US Top Gospel Albums (Billboard)	12
US Top Holiday Albums (Billboard)	42

== Accolades ==
Year	Award	Category	Result	Ref.
2020	Grammy Award	Best Gospel Album	Nominated	
