= Waging War (song) =

Single by CeCe Winans

from the album Thy Kingdom Come
- Released: March 4, 2008
- Genre: CCM
- Length: 5:20
- Label: Pure Springs Gospel
- Songwriters: Christopher Capehart, Brannon Tunie, CeCe Winans

CeCe Winans singles chronology
"Waging War" (2008)	"It Ain't Over" (2008)

"Waging War" is the first single from CeCe Winans' 2008 album Thy Kingdom Come. The song was released on March 4, 2008 and was written by CeCe Winans, Christopher Capehart, and Brannon Tunie. The song was also featured on the first disc of the 2010 compilation album WOW Gospel 2010

== Awards ==
"Waging War" received a Grammy Award nomination for "Best Gospel Performance" at the 51st Grammy Awards of 2009 and a Dove Award nomination for Contemporary Gospel Recorded Song of the Year at the 40th GMA Dove Awards.
