= Believe for It (song) =

2021 song by CeCe Winans

"Believe For It"

Single by CeCe Winans

from the album Believe for It
- Released: March 26, 2021
- Genre: Contemporary worship
- Length: 8:22 (live); 3:48 (studio); 5:38 (duet)
- Label: Puresprings Gospel; Fair Trade Services
- Songwriters: CeCe Winans; Dwan Hill; Kyle Lee; Mitch Wong
- Producer: Kyle Lee

CeCe Winans singles chronology
"Never Lost" (2020)	"Believe For It" (2021)	"I've Got Joy" (2022)

Duet version
- Duet version with Lauren Daigle

Music videos
- "Believe for It" on YouTube
- "Believe for It" (Acoustic) on YouTube
- "Believe for It" (Lyrics) on YouTube

"Believe for It" is a song by American gospel singer CeCe Winans, which was released on March 26, 2021, as the second single from her first live album, also titled Believe for It (2021). Winans co-wrote the song with Dwan Hill, Kyle Lee, and Mitch Wong. Kyle Lee produced the single.

"Believe for It" peaked at number nine on the US Hot Christian Songs chart, and number one on the Hot Gospel Songs chart. The song was ranked by Billboard as the fourth biggest gospel song in 2021, and the eighth biggest gospel song in 2022. "Believe for It" won the GMA Dove Award Gospel Worship Recorded Song of the Year at the 2021 GMA Dove Awards. The song also won the Grammy Award for Best Contemporary Christian Music Performance/Song at the 2022 Grammy Awards. At the 2022 GMA Dove Awards, "Believe for It" won the GMA Dove Award for Song of the Year, while the duet version featuring Lauren Daigle was nominated for Contemporary Gospel Recorded Song of the Year.

== Background ==
"Believe for It" was initially released as the first and only promotional single from CeCe Winans' live album of the same name on February 5, 2021. On February 12, 2021, the radio team of Fair Trade Services announced that the song would be serviced to Christian radio in the United States, the official add date for the single slated on March 26, 2021. Winans shared the story behind the song, saying:

It's bigger than a record, it's a theme that I really want people to embrace—people who believe in God and people who might not ever go to church. I believe that hope is needed, and I want to impart this into the hearts of people everywhere. The song challenges people to not brush off your dreams; don't give up or give in, but it's time to believe that you can make it. Believe that you can achieve what's in your heart. It's time to believe for wholeness and healing for yourself, your family, and your community. It's time to believe for unity.

== Composition ==
"Believe for It" is composed in the key of G with a tempo of 79 beats per minute, and a musical time signature of 4/4.

== Reception ==
=== Critical response ===
JubileeCast's Timothy Yap called the song "a dramatic and crescendo-building anthem about how God can do the impossible" in his review. Kevin Davis of NewReleaseToday said the song was an album standout, saying "It's a song that is filled with so much power and worship, and I love that." The Washington Informer also said the track was an album favourite, saying that "her [Winans'] vocals, with the message, are magnified into a very powerful instrument that put tears in my eyes every time I hear it." Howard Dukes of SoulTracks gave a positive review of the song, saying "'Believe for It' is a song with a message that is meant for the time in which we live."

=== Accolades ===
Awards
Year	Organization	Award	Result	Ref
2021	GMA Dove Awards	Gospel Worship Recorded Song of the Year	Won	
2022	Grammy Awards	Best Contemporary Christian Music Performance/Song	Won	
2022	NAACP Image Awards	Outstanding Gospel/Christian Song	Nominated	
2022	GMA Dove Awards	Song of the Year	Won	
2022	GMA Dove Awards	Contemporary Gospel Recorded Song of the Year ("Believe for It" featuring Lauren Daigle)	Nominated	

== Commercial performance ==
Following the release of "Believe for It" as a promotional single, the song debuted at number nine on the US Hot Gospel Songs chart dated February 20, 2021. "Believe for It" ascended to number one on the Hot Gospel Songs chart dated June 12, 2021, becoming her second Hot Gospel Songs chart-topping hit after her song "Pray" topped the chart for two weeks in January 2006. "Believe for It" spent twelve weeks at number one, and a total of forty-six weeks overall on the Hot Gospel Songs chart.

"Believe for It" debuted at number 22 on the US Hot Christian Songs dated April 3, 2021. The song peaked at number nine on the Hot Christian Songs chart dated August 21, 2021, and spent twenty-eight weeks overall on the chart.

== Music videos ==
The lyric video of the song was published on CeCe Winans' YouTube channel on February 12, 2021. On February 25, 2021, Winans released the acoustic one take session video of the song via YouTube. The official audio video for the live version of "Believe for It" showcasing the album's cover art was uploaded on YouTube on March 12, 2021. On June 15, 2021, Winans released the official live music video of "Believe for It" filmed at Trinity Broadcasting Network through YouTube. The official audio video for the duet version of "Believe For It" featuring Lauren Daigle showcasing the single's cover art was uploaded on YouTube on March 12, 2021.

== Track listing ==
"Believe for It" (Live)
No.	Title	Writer(s)	Producer	Length
1.	"Believe for It" (Live)	CeCe Winans; Dwan Hill; Kyle Lee; Mitch Wong	Kyle Lee	8:22

"Believe for It" – Duet
No.	Title	Producer	Length
1.	"Believe for It" (with Lauren Daigle)	Kyle Lee	5:38

== Charts ==
=== Weekly charts ===
Weekly chart performance for "Believe for It"
Chart (2021)	Peak position
US Hot Christian Songs (Billboard)	9
US Christian Airplay (Billboard)	7
US Christian AC (Billboard)	6
US Gospel Songs (Billboard)	1
US Gospel Airplay (Billboard)	1

=== Year-end charts ===
Year-end chart performance for "Believe for It"
Chart (2021)	Position
US Christian Songs (Billboard)	21
US Christian Airplay (Billboard)	26
US Christian AC (Billboard)	16
US Gospel Digital Songs (Billboard)	1
US Gospel Songs (Billboard)	4
Chart (2022)	Position
US Gospel Airplay (Billboard)	16
US Gospel Digital Songs (Billboard)	2
US Gospel Songs (Billboard)	8
US Gospel Streaming Songs (Billboard)	12
Chart (2023)	Position
US Gospel Digital Songs (Billboard)	2
US Gospel Streaming Songs (Billboard)	15

== Certifications ==
Certifications and sales for "Believe for It"
Region	Certification	Certified units/sales
United States (RIAA)	Gold	500,000^{‡}
^{‡} Sales+streaming figures based on certification alone.

== Believe for It (Eu Creio) version ==
"Believe for It (Eu Creio)"

Single by CeCe Winans and Gabriela Rocha
- Released: August 26, 2022
- Recorded: 2022
- Genre: Contemporary worship music
- Length: 5:38
- Label: Puresprings Gospel; Fair Trade Services
- Producer: Kyle Lee

CeCe Winans singles chronology
"I've Got Joy" (2022)	"Believe for It (Eu Creio)" (2022)	"The Blood" (2023)

Gabriela Rocha singles chronology
"Vem" (2021)	"Believe for It (Eu Creio)" (2022)	"És o Amor" (2023)

CeCe Winans and Gabriela Rocha released "Believe for It (Eu Creio)" on August 26, 2022, as a standalone single. "Believe for It (Eu Creio)" features Winans singing part of the track in English and Rocha singing in Portuguese.

=== Commercial performance ===
"Believe for It (Eu Creio)" debuted at No. 22 on the Hot Gospel Songs chart dated September 10, 2022.

=== Track listing ===
"Believe for It (Eu Creio)"
No.	Title	Producer	Length
1.	"Believe for It (Eu Creio)" (with Gabriela Rocha)	Kyle Lee	5:38

=== Charts ===
Chart performance for "Believe for It (Eu Creio)"
Chart (2022)	Peak position
US Christian Airplay (Billboard)	38
US Gospel Songs (Billboard)	24

== Release history ==
Release history and formats for "Believe for It"
Region	Date	Version	Format	Label	Ref.
Various	February 5, 2021	Live	Digital download; streaming; (promotional release)	Puresprings Gospel	
United States	March 26, 2021	Studio	Christian radio	Fair Trade Services	
Various	September 10, 2021	Duet (with Lauren Daigle)	Digital download; streaming	Puresprings Gospel	
Various	August 26, 2022	"Believe for It (Eu Creio)" (with Gabriela Rocha)	Digital download; streaming	Puresprings Gospel	
