= Purified (album) =

Studio album by CeCe Winans
- Released: September 13, 2005
- Studios: Fairway Studios (Anniston, Alabama): Cedarmont Farms, Dark Horse Recording and The Bennett House (Franklin, Tennessee); Platinum Lab Recording, Shut The Door Studio and Uncle Tom's Cabin (Nashville, Tennessee); Blue Heaven Studios (Salina, Kansas); Big 3 Recording Studios (St. Petersburg, Florida)
- Genres: Funk: Gospel; Soul
- Length: 52:46
- Label: PureSprings Gospel
- Producers: Andy Selby; Tommy Sims; Keith Thomas (also exec.); Mario Winans; Adam Anders (add.); Supaflyas (add.); Michael Taylor (exec.); Demetrus Stewart

CeCe Winans chronology
Throne Room (2003)	Purified (2005)	Thy Kingdom Come (2008)

Singles from Purified
- 1. "Pray" Released: July 2005; 2. "All That I Need" Released: July 2005; 3. "He's Concerned" Released: 2005; 4. "You Are Loved" Released: 2006; 5. "Let Everything That Has Breath" Released: 2006

Professional ratings
Review scores
Source	Rating
AllMusic	3.5/5 stars

Purified is the seventh studio album by American singer CeCe Winans. It was released independently under her own label, PureSprings Gospel, on September 13, 2005, in the United States. Purified won the Grammy Award for Best Contemporary Soul Gospel Album at the 48th Annual Grammy Awards on February 8, 2006, while the song "Pray" won a Grammy for Grammy Award for Best Gospel/Contemporary Christian Music Performance.

The singles "Pray" and "All That I Need" were released in July in anticipation of the album's release. Winans' nephew, Mario Winans, produced the former. It reached number one on Billboard's Hot Gospel Songs chart, while "Let Everything That Has Breath" peaked at number 8 on the Dance Music/Club Play chart. Other singles include "You Are Loved", which peaked at number 38 on the Adult R&B Songs chart, and "He's Concerned".

== Critical reception ==
Rick Anderson for AllMusic writes, "Her seventh solo album is a mixed bag, thematically speaking, combining funky pop music, moderately gritty R&B, and more typical gospel fare."

Stan North begins his review for GospelFlava by writing, "On Purified, CeCe Winans' seventh solo project, the emphasis swings back to catchy, soulful jams, with pop sensibilities. And she brings in some familiar names —both family and friends— to do it."

== Track listing ==
No.	Title	Writer(s)	Length
1.	"Mama's Kitchen"	Drew and Shannon; Heather Headley; Tommy Sims	3:02
2.	"You Will"	Tommy Sims	4:22
3.	"Pray" (Ken Lewis Mix)	CeCe Winans; Mario Winans; Michael Carlos Jones	3:28
4.	"All That I Need"	CeCe Winans; Keith Thomas	3:52
5.	"Just Like That"	CeCe Winans; Thomas	3:08
6.	"You Are Loved"	Denise Allen; Dennis Matkosky; Madeline Stone	5:51
7.	"Let Everything That Has Breath"	Fred Sawyers; Jeff Kwafie; Myrna Walker; William Burke	3:18
8.	"Always Sisters" (Featuring Angie & Debbie Winans)	Angie Winans; CeCe Winans; Debbie Winans; Sims	4:12
9.	"I Promise (Wedding Song)"	CeCe Winans; Thomas	4:52
10.	"Colorful World"	CeCe Winans; Thomas; Alvin Love III	4:31
11.	"A Place Like This" (Featuring GRITS)	CeCe Winans; Thomas; Love	4:15
12.	"Purified"	CeCe Winans; Thomas; Love	4:34
13.	"He's Concerned"	Kayla Parker	3:21
Total length:			52:46

== Personnel ==
- CeCe Winans – vocals, backing vocals (7)
- Tommy Sims – keyboards (1, 2, 8), guitars (1, 8), bass (1, 8), drums (1), backing vocals (1), acoustic guitar (2, 7), synth horns (8)
- Andy Selby – programming (2, 6, 7)
- Mario Winans – all instruments (3)
- Keith Thomas – keyboards (4, 5, 9–13), bass (4, 5, 9–12), arrangements (4, 5, 9–13), drum programming (9, 11, 12), acoustic guitar (10, 12), additional drums (10), acoustic piano (13)
- Dan Muckala – keyboards (4), drum programming (4), additional keyboards (9)
- Michael Ripoll – electric guitars (5, 6, 11), acoustic guitar (9), nylon guitar (9, 11)
- Jerry McPherson – electric guitars (10)
- Josiah Bell – drum programming (5, 8), keyboards (10, 11), additional drums (10), additional drum programming (11)
- Dan Needham – drums (10)
- Eric Darken – percussion (9, 13)
- The Nashville String Machine – strings (2, 6)
- Lloyd Barry – string arrangements and conductor (2)
- Tim Akers – string arrangements (6)
- Carl Gorodetzky – string contractor (2, 6)
- Tiffany Palmer – backing vocals (1)
- Darwin Hobbs – backing vocals (2)
- Leanne Palmore – backing vocals (2, 7, 9)
- Jerard Woods – backing vocals (2, 7, 9)
- Jovaun Woods – backing vocals (2, 7, 9)
- The Born Again Church Choir – backing vocals (2)
- Lisa Cochran – backing vocals (4)
- Debbie Winans-Lowe – backing vocals (4, 10, 12), vocals (8)
- Kayla Parker – backing vocals (5, 11, 13), BGV arrangements (13)
- Debi Selby – backing vocals (6)
- Nee-C Walls-Allen – backing vocals (6)
- Angie Winans – vocals (8)
- Rachel Gaines – backing vocals (8)
- GRITS – rap (11)

== Production ==
- Demetrus Stewart – executive producer
- Michael-Anthony Taylor – executive producer
- Keith Thomas – executive producer
- Ken Johnson – production coordinator (1, 2, 6–8)
- Daryl Bush – production coordinator (4, 5, 9–13)
- Ryan Kyzar – production coordinator (4, 5, 9–13)
- Giulio Turturro – art direction
- Kwaku Alscon – photography
- Kenny Vereen – hair stylist
- Derrick Rutledge – make-up
- Roni Burke – stylist
- Chandra Jamison – stylist

Technical

- Tom Coyne – mastering at Sterling Sound (New York City, New York)
- Drew Douthit – engineer (1, 2, 7, 8), string recording assistant (2, 6), mixing (2, 6, 8), digital editing (7, 8)
- Marcelo Pennell – mixing (1, 7)
- Danny Duncan – string recording (2, 6)
- Eric Hunter – recording (3)
- Ken Lewis – mixing (3)
- Bill Whittington – recording (4, 5, 9–13), mixing (4, 5, 9–13)
- Andy Selby – recording (6), string recording (6), mixing (6), digital editing (7, 8)
- Bryan Lenox – mixing (8)
- Tommy Sims – mixing (8)
- Ryan Kyzar – Pro Tools and MIDI technician (4, 5, 9–13)
- Chris Yoakum – Pro Tools and MIDI technician (4, 5, 9–13)

== Charts ==
=== Weekly charts ===
Chart (2005)	Peak position
US Billboard 200	41
US Top Christian Albums (Billboard)	3
US Top Gospel Albums (Billboard)	1
US Top R&B/Hip-Hop Albums (Billboard)	12

=== Year-end charts ===
Chart (2005)	Position
US Top Gospel Albums (Billboard)	8
