= Believe for It (album) =

2021 live album by CeCe Winans

Live album by CeCe Winans
- Released: March 12, 2021
- Recorded: 2020
- Venue: TBN Studio, Nashville, Tennessee, U.S.
- Genre: Contemporary gospel; contemporary worship
- Length: 97:39
- Label: Puresprings Gospel; Fair Trade Services
- Producer: Kyle Lee; Dwan Hill (co-producer)

CeCe Winans chronology
Something's Happening! A Christmas Album (2018)	Believe for It (2021)	More Than This (2024)

Alternative cover
- Deluxe edition cover

Singles from Believe for It
- 1. "Never Lost" Released: September 4, 2020; 2. "Believe for It" Released: March 26, 2021; 3. "I've Got Joy" Released: May 13, 2022

Believe for It is the first live album and twelfth overall album by American gospel singer CeCe Winans. It was released on March 12, 2021, via Puresprings Gospel and Fair Trade Services. The deluxe edition of the album was released on April 1, 2022. The album was produced by Kyle Lee.

Believe for It was supported by the release of "Never Lost," the album's title track, and "I've Got Joy" as singles. "Never Lost" peaked at number two on the Hot Gospel Songs chart. "Believe for It" peaked atop the Hot Gospel Songs chart and at number nine on the Hot Christian Songs Chart. "I've Got Joy" peaked at number 11 on the Hot Gospel Songs chart and number 26 on the Hot Christian Songs chart. To further promote the album, Winans will embark on the Believe for It: Live In Concert tour which will span over 40 cities across the United States in the fall of 2022.

Believe for It became a commercially successful album upon its release, debuting at number one on Billboard's Top Gospel Albums Chart and at number two on Top Christian Albums Chart in the United States. The album was ranked by Billboard as the biggest gospel album by a gospel artist in 2022. The album garnered critical acclaim following its release. At the 52nd GMA Dove Awards in 2021, Believe for It won the GMA Dove Award for Gospel Worship Album of the Year, with the title track also being awarded the GMA Dove Award Gospel Worship Recorded Song of the Year, and "Never Lost" getting nominated for the GMA Dove Award Contemporary Gospel Recorded Song of the Year. At the 64th Annual Grammy Awards, the album was awarded the Grammy Award for Best Gospel Album, with the title track also being awarded for Best Contemporary Christian Music Performance/Song and "Never Lost" also getting awarded for Best Gospel Performance/Song making CeCe the only gospel artist to sweep every category they were nominated for. At the 2022 Billboard Music Awards, it was also nominated for the Billboard Music Award for Top Christian Album and Top Gospel Album. At the 53rd GMA Dove Awards in 2022, "Believe for It" won the GMA Dove Award for Song of the Year, "I've Got Joy" was nominated for Inspirational Recorded Song of the Year, and "Goodness of God" was nominated for Gospel Worship Recorded Song of the Year.

== Background ==
Believe for It marks CeCe Winans' first live album in her solo career and the first non-holiday release in four years since Let Them Fall in Love (2017). The album was recorded in late 2020 at the TBN Studio in Nashville, Tennessee, with a small audience in attendance due to COVID-19 pandemic social distancing guidelines. On April 1, 2022, CeCe Winans released the deluxe edition of Believe for It, containing additional studio versions of previously released songs and a new song titled "I've Got Joy."

== Music and lyrics ==
Grace Chaves of NewReleaseToday described Believe for It as "a compilation of some of her original songs, alongside covers of other popular worship songs from bands like Elevation Worship, Bethel Music, and artists David & Nicole Binion." Winans shared in interview with American Songwriter that she chose "songs that were popular, that people have sung in the past but also current songs that are being sung in worship times all around this nation, probably around the world," further adding that the album contains two new songs "a couple new songs that will keep it a little exciting," although the overarching focus of the album is to be "just a time of worship." "No Greater" and "Believe for It" are the two new songs on the album.

== Release and promotion ==
=== Singles ===
On September 4, 2020, CeCe Winans released "Never Lost" as the lead single from the album. "Never Lost" peaked at number two on the US Hot Gospel Songs chart. "Never Lost" was nominated for the 2021 NAACP Image Award for Outstanding Gospel/Christian Song, the GMA Dove Award for Contemporary Gospel Recorded Song of the Year at the 2021 GMA Dove Awards, and won the 2022 Grammy Award for Best Gospel Performance/Song.

"Believe for It" was serviced to Christian radio stations in the United States on March 26, 2021, becoming the second single from the album. "Believe for It" peaked at number one on the Hot Gospel Songs chart, and number nine on the US Hot Christian Songs chart. "Believe for It" won the GMA Dove Award Gospel Worship Recorded Song of the Year at the 2021 GMA Dove Awards, and the 2022 Grammy Award for Best Contemporary Christian Music Performance/Song, It was also nominated for nominated for the 2022 NAACP Image Award for Outstanding Gospel/Christian Song. At the 2022 GMA Dove Awards, "Believe for It" won the GMA Dove Award for Song of the Year.

"I've Got Joy" impacted Christian radio stations in the United States on May 13, 2022, becoming the third single from the album. "I've Got Joy" peaked at number 11 on the Hot Gospel Songs chart, and number 26 on the US Hot Christian Songs chart. At the 53rd GMA Dove Awards in 2022, "I've Got Joy" was nominated for the GMA Dove Award for Inspirational Recorded Song of the Year.

=== Promotional singles ===
"Believe for It" was released as the first and only promotional single from the album on February 5, 2021.

=== Other songs ===
"Goodness of God" reached number three on the Hot Gospel Songs chart, and number six on the Hot Christian Songs chart, despite not being an official single. At the 53rd GMA Dove Awards in 2022, "Goodness of God" was nominated for the GMA Dove Award for Gospel Worship Recorded Song of the Year. Goodness of God became the most-used song on Tik-Tok with over 2 billion streams between August and October 2022.

== Touring ==
In April 2022, CeCe Winans announced the Believe for It: Live In Concert Tour, which spanned over 25 cities across the United States in the fall. The sold-out tour marks Winans' first nationwide tour in over a decade. This tour commenced on September 21, 2022, in Indianapolis, Indiana, and concluded on November 4, 2022, in St. Louis, Missouri. Winans started part two of the tour in the spring of 2023, and Jenn Johnson and Todd Dulaney joined her as supporting acts for the final six shows in the fall of 2023.

== Reception ==
=== Critical response ===
Professional ratings
Review scores
Source	Rating
The Journal of Gospel Music	5/5 stars
JubileeCast	5/5

In a positive review for the Journal of Gospel Music, Robert Marovich said "CeCe Winans is at the apex of her vocal strength on Believe for It, the best album JGM has heard thus far in 2021." Timothy Yap of JubileeCast praised Winans in his review of the album, saying: "On the whole, this record like the last few Winans albums, is sublime. Even after all these years of recording and performing, Winans shows no signs of wear and tear in her vocals; in fact, she still has that uncanny ability to convey an array of emotions in her articulations." Grace Chaves wrote a positive review of the album for NewReleaseToday, saying "Overall, CeCe released a great live album. From the rerelease of her classic song "Alabaster Box," to her rendition of "Goodness of God," CeCe nailed this new album. Although I enjoy shorter/upbeat songs, I still believe that she released a really solid worship album." The Washington Informer gave a favourable review of the album, saying, "Believe For It is an electrifying project that will have you feeling chills and crying (with tears of joy) upon hearing the messages in each song."

=== Accolades ===
Awards and nominations
Year	Association	Category	Result	Ref
2021	GMA Dove Awards	Gospel Worship Album of the Year	Won	
2022	Billboard Music Awards	Top Christian Album	Nominated	
2022	Billboard Music Awards	Top Gospel Album	Nominated	
2022	Grammy Awards	Best Gospel Album	Won	
2022	NAACP Image Awards	Outstanding Gospel/Christian Album	Nominated	

Year-end lists
Publication	Accolade	Rank	Ref.
JubileeCast	Best Christian Albums of 2021	4	

== Commercial performance ==
In the United States, Believe for It earned 4,000 equivalent album units, with 3,000 from sales, in its first tracking week, debuting at number one on the Top Gospel Albums chart and at number two on the Top Christian Albums Chart dated March 27, 2021. It is her ninth release to reach number-one on the US Top Gospel Albums chart. The album sat at number one for a total of 14 weeks with over 34 million streams.

== Track listing ==
Sourced from

No.	Title	Writer(s)	Length
1.	"Fire"	CeCe Winans; Kyle Lee; Dwan Hill	7:13
2.	"Never Lost"	Steven Furtick; Chris Brown; Tiffany Hammer	6:43
3.	"Believe for It"	Winans; Lee; Hill; Mitch Wong	8:22
4.	"King of Glory"	Todd Anthony Dulaney	10:35
5.	"Worthy of It All"	David Brymer; Ryan Hall	5:29
6.	"Hunger"	Madison Gracie Binion; Wong	5:37
7.	"Just to Be Close to You"	Fred Hammond; Noel Hall	3:32
8.	"Shepherd"	Hill	6:18
9.	"Alabaster Box"	Janice Sjostrand	5:41
10.	"Jesus You're Beautiful"	Nathan Sabin	7:13
11.	"I Have a Savior"	Anna Byrd; Lee; Leeland Mooring	9:18
12.	"Goodness of God"	Ed Cash; Jenn Johnson; Jason Ingram; Brian Johnson; Ben Fielding	4:57
13.	"No Greater"	Alvin Love III	8:43
14.	"Never Lost" (studio version)		4:10
15.	"Believe for It" (studio version)		3:48
Total length:			97:39

Deluxe edition
No.	Title	Writer(s)	Length
16.	"I Have a Savior" (studio version)		4:40
17.	"No Greater" (studio version)		4:18
18.	"I've Got Joy"	Phil Wickham; Lee	3:38
19.	"Believe for It" (live music video)		9:20

== Personnel ==
Credits adapted from AllMusic.

=== Musicians and Vocals ===
- CeCe Winans – lead vocals
- Dwan Hill – acoustic piano, orchestra leader
- Thomas Hardin Jr. – Hammond B3 organ
- David Ramirez – synthesizers, programming
- Nathan Dugger – acoustic guitar
- Tyrone Jackson – guitars
- Casey Moore – guitars
- Jacob Lowery – bass
- Marcus Hill – drums
- Elicia Brown – backing vocals
- Mark Gutierrez – backing vocals
- Madelyn Howze – backing vocals
- Chaunda Jefferson – backing vocals
- Calvin Nowell – backing vocals
- Christi Richardson – backing vocals
- Debi Selby – backing vocals
- Jerard Woods – backing vocals
- Jovaun Woods – backing vocals

Choir

- Taylor Browning
- Marcus Criner
- Eden DeJesus
- Alex Gomez
- Megan Harney
- Bradley Rodermond
- Brandon Rodermond
- Michelle Schorp
- Kimberly Thomas
- Illiani Torres
- Jemia Wingard

=== Production ===
- Chaz Corzine – executive producer
- Greg Ham – executive producer
- CeCe Winans – executive producer
- Derek Spirk – associate executive producer
- Dwan Hill – producer
- Kyle Lee – producer
- Russell Hall – director, producer
- Sean Moffitt – mixing
- Bob Boyd – mastering at Ambient Digital (Houston, Texas)
- Talia Clifford – A&R
- Jake Moore – A&R
- Brad Hill – lighting director
- Chad Landers – production design
- Chris Biano – artwork, package design
- Calvin Nowell – artwork, package design
- Kris Rae Orlowski – photography

== Charts ==
=== Weekly charts ===
Weekly chart performance for Believe for It
Chart (2021)	Peak position
UK Christian & Gospel Albums (OCC)	11
US Top Christian Albums (Billboard)	3
US Top Gospel Albums (Billboard)	1
US Top Album Sales (Billboard)	45

=== Year-end charts ===
Year-end chart performance for Believe for It
Chart (2021)	Position
US Christian Albums (Billboard)	30
US Gospel Albums (Billboard)	5
Chart (2022)	Position
US Christian Albums (Billboard)	17
US Gospel Albums (Billboard)	3
Chart (2023)	Position
US Christian Albums (Billboard)	5
US Gospel Albums (Billboard)	3
Chart (2025)	Position
US Christian Albums (Billboard)	15
US GospelAlbums (Billboard)	4

== Release history ==
Release history and formats for Believe for It
Region	Date	Version	Format(s)	Label(s)	Ref.
Various	March 12, 2021	Standard	Digital download; streaming	Puresprings Gospel; Fair Trade Services	
Various	April 1, 2022	Deluxe	Digital download; streaming	Puresprings Gospel; Fair Trade Services	
