= More Than This (CeCe Winans album) =

Live album by CeCe Winans
- Released: April 26, 2024
- Genre: Gospel
- Length: 63:56
- Label: PureSprings
- Producer: Kyle Lee Thomas Hardin Jr. (co-producer) Tyrone Jackson (co-producer)

CeCe Winans chronology
Believe for It (2021)	More Than This (2024)	Joyful, Joyful: A Christmas Album (2024)

Professional ratings
Review scores
Source	Rating
AllMusic	4/5 stars

More Than This is the second solo live album and thirteenth overall album by American singer CeCe Winans. It was released on April 26, 2024 via Puresprings Gospel as the follow-up to Believe for It (2021). Recorded in Nashville, it was produced by Kyle Lee with co-producers Thomas Hardin Jr. and Tyrone Jackson.

The album peaked at number 196 on the Billboard 200, number 20 on the Top Album Sales chart, and number one on both the Christian Albums and Gospel Albums charts in the United States. It reached number 8 on the Official Christian & Gospel Albums Chart in the UK.

It won a Gospel Worship Album of the Year at the 55th GMA Dove Awards, a Grammy Award for Best Gospel Album at the 67th Annual Grammy Awards, and received a nomination for a Billboard Music Award for Top Gospel Album at the 31st Billboard Music Awards.

The album's single "That's My King" has won a 2024 Billboard Music Award for Top Gospel Song and was nominated for a Dove Award for Gospel Worship Recorded Song of the Year.

The deluxe edition was released on April 24, 2026.

== Accolades ==
Year	Organization	Category	Result	Ref.
2026	Dove Awards	Gospel Worship Album of the Year	Pending	

== Track listing ==
No.	Title	Writer(s)	Length
1.	"Lord and Friend"	Alvin Love III	4:32
2.	"Be Still and Know"	Priscilla Marie Love; Kyle Lee; Love III	4:05
3.	"Too Late to Lose"	Lee; Michael Bethany; Mitch Wong	6:34
4.	"Oh the Blood of Jesus"	Public Domain	1:24
5.	"Holy Forever"	Chris Tomlin; Brian Johnson; Jason Ingram; Jenn Johnson; Phil Wickham	5:07
6.	"Worthy"	Steven Furtick; Chris Brown; Mack Brock	5:21
7.	"That's My King"	Taylor Agan; Lloyd Nicks; Jess Russ; Kellie Gamble	4:10
8.	"More Than This" (with Todd Dulaney)	Love; Dulaney; Lee	8:19
9.	"Sanctuary"	Randy Scruggs; John Thompson	1:20
10.	"Refiner"	Chandler Moore	5:12
11.	"Come Jesus Come"	Hank Bentley; Bryan Fowler; Stephen McWhirter; Tara McWhirter	4:58
12.	"Is He Worthy?"	Andrew Peterson; Ben Shive	5:07
13.	"In a Little While"	Love III	7:47
Total length:			63:56

Deluxe edition
No.	Title	Writer(s)	Producer(s)	Length
14.	"We Pray"	Winans; Lee; Ben Fielding		6:01
15.	"Worthy Of It All (Worthy)"	David Brymer; Ryan Hall; Chris Brown; Steven Furtick; Mack Brock	Bryan Fowler	3:42
16.	"More Than This (Radio Edit)" (with Dulaney)			4:04
17.	"Come Jesus Come" (with Cody Johnson)			4:50
18.	"Come Jesus Come" (with Shirley Caesar)			5:00
19.	"Come Jesus Come (Radio Version)"			4:11
20.	"That's My King (Single Version)"			3:38
Total length:				1 hr, 35 min

== Charts ==
=== Weekly charts ===
Chart (2024)	Peak position
US Billboard 200	196
US Top Album Sales (Billboard)	20
US Top Christian Albums (Billboard)	1
US Top Gospel Albums (Billboard)	1
US Top Current Album Sales (Billboard)	17

=== Year-end charts ===
Chart (2024)	Position
US Top Christian Albums (Billboard)	38
US Top Gospel Albums (Billboard)	6
Chart (2025)	Position
US Top Christian Albums (Billboard)	9
US Top Gospel Albums (Billboard)	3
