= CeCe Winans (album) =

Studio album by Cece Winans
- Released: June 19, 2001
- Studios: The Lodge and Sound Kitchen (Franklin, Tennessee): Sound Stage Studios, Seventeen Grand Recording and Recording Arts Studios (Nashville, Tennessee); Abbey Road Studios (London, UK)
- Genre: Funk: Soul
- Length: 55:52
- Labels: Wellspring Gospel; Sparrow
- Producers: Winans (exec.); Michael Blanton (exec.); Brown Bannister; Robbie Buchanan (co.); Tommy Sims (also co.); Demetrus Stewart (exec.)

Cece Winans chronology
Alabaster Box (1999)	CeCe Winans (2001)	Throne Room (2003)

Singles from CeCe Winans
- 1. "More Than What I Wanted" Released: 2001; 2. "Anybody Wanna Pray" Released: 2001

CeCe Winans is the fifth studio album by American singer CeCe Winans. It was released by WellSpring Gospel and Sparrow Records on June 19, 2001, in the United States. The album adopted a more urban flair to it with a mixture of pop, R&B, and hip hop. It spawned the singles "More Than What I Wanted", which peaked at number 9 on the Billboard Adult R&B Songs chart, and "Anybody Wanna Pray". A track-by-track commentary is provided for all the 13 songs.

== Critical reception ==
Professional ratings
Review scores
Source	Rating
Allmusic	4/5 stars

Allmusic editor Ashleigh Kittle wrote that "upbeat, energy-filled, and enthusiastic, the project is not only musically diverse but offers hard-hitting messages. The song "It's Gonna Get Better" was written with teen suicide prevention programs in mind, while "Bring Back the Days of Yea and Nay," a duet with brother Marvin Winans, challenges parents to take responsibility for training their children. A definite highlight on the album is the song "Looking Back at You." It is an inspirational track, leaning toward a ballad, that speaks of God's unfailing and unconditional love."

== Track listing ==
No.	Title	Writer(s)	Length
1.	"Heavenly Father"	Tommy Sims; CeCe Winans	4:22
2.	"Anybody Wanna Pray" (featuring GRITS)	Margaret Bell; Cedric Caldwell; Victor Caldwell; Sims	4:00
3.	"Say a Prayer"	CeCe Winans; Dennis Matkosky; Madeline Stone	4:15
4.	"More Than What I Wanted"	Adrian Gurvitz; Jamie O'Neal; Sims	3:27
5.	"Looking Back at You"	Gurvitz; Wendy Waldman; C. Winans	3:48
6.	"More Than Just a Friend"	Gerald Leon Kinchelow; Kayla Parker; Michael J. Powell	4:18
7.	"No One"	Ira Antelis; Marc Anthony; Cory Rooney	4:20
8.	"For Love Alone"	Adam Anders; Pamela Sheyne; C. Winans	4:59
9.	"Bring Back the Days of Yea and Nay" (featuring Marvin Winans)	M. Winans	4:51
10.	"Out of My House"	Sims; C. Winans	3:51
11.	"Holy Spirit, Come Fill This Place"	Marty Hennis; Babbie Mason	5:35
12.	"It's Gonna Get Better"	Sims; C. Winans	4:01
13.	"Better Place"	Nee-C Walls; Nick Trevisick	4:05

== Personnel ==
- CeCe Winans – vocals
- Dan Muckala – programming (3, 6)
- Jeremy Bose – keyboards (4), drum programming (4)
- Robbie Buchanan – programming (5), arrangements (5)
- Bernie Herms – programming (7, 9, 11), acoustic piano (9)
- Blair Masters – programming (7), additional keyboards (7), Hammond B3 organ (7), synthesizer overdubs (8, 13), Fender Rhodes (12)
- Adam Anders – programming (8), bass (8)
- Marc Q. Harris – Hammond B3 organ (12)
- Nick Trevisick – programming (13)
- Tommy Sims – acoustic guitars (1, 4), drum programming (1), percussion (1), horn arrangements (1), rhythm arrangements (1, 2, 4), string arrangements (1), vocal arrangements (1, 2, 4), synthesizers (2, 4, 10), guitars (2), bass (2, 4, 10, 12), drums (2, 10), backing vocals (2), sitar (4), additional programming (6), all arrangements (10)
- Andrew Ramsey – acoustic guitars (1, 12)
- Chris Rodriguez – electric guitars (3, 6, 7, 13), backing vocals (3), acoustic guitars (7)
- Jerry McPherson – guitars (8)
- Craig Young – bass (8)
- Mark Hill – bass (9)
- Scott Williamson – drums (9)
- Dan Needham – drums (12)
- Eric Darken – percussion (7, 9, 11–13)
- Darrell Tibbs – percussion (12)
- Barry Green – horns (1)
- Mike Haynes – horns (1, 6, 13)
- Mark Douthit – horns (6, 13)
- Doug Moffett – horns (6, 13)
- Denis Solee – horns (6, 13)
- Tim Akers – horn arrangements (6, 13)
- John Catchings – strings (1)
- Jacob Lawson – strings (1)
- The London Session Orchestra – strings (5, 8, 9, 11, 12)
- Gavyn Wright – concertmaster (5, 8, 9, 11, 12)
- Carl Marsh – string arrangements (5, 9, 11, 12)
- Ronn Huff – string arrangements (8)
- Brown Bannister – BGV arrangements (11)
- Leanne Palmore – backing vocals (1–3, 7, 9, 12)
- Jerard Woods – backing vocals (1, 2, 12)
- Jovaun Woods – backing vocals (1, 2, 12)
- GRITS – rap (2)
- Giorgio Ammirabile – backing vocals (3, 7)
- Travis Cottrell – backing vocals (3)
- Da'dra Crawford-Greathouse – backing vocals (3, 7–9)
- Steve Crawford – backing vocals (3, 7, 9)
- Fiona Mellett – backing vocals (3, 9)
- Michael Mellett – backing vocals (3, 4, 7, 8), BGV arrangements (7–9)
- Wendy Moten – backing vocals (3, 7, 9, 13)
- Kayla Parker – backing vocals (3, 6, 11), BGV arrangements (6, 11)
- Joey Ritchie – backing vocals (3, 7, 9)
- Nicol Smith – backing vocals (3, 13)
- Ken "Scat" Springs – backing vocals (3, 7)
- Micah Wilshire – backing vocals (3)
- Debbie Winans-Lowe – backing vocals (3, 8, 12)
- Chip Davis – backing vocals (4), vocal arrangements (4)
- Sue Ann Carwell – backing vocals (5)
- Leanne Albrecht – backing vocals (7)
- Lisa Bevill – backing vocals (7)
- Angela Cruz – backing vocals (7)
- Peter Penrose – backing vocals (7)
- Tiffany Palmer – backing vocals (8, 10)
- Nirva Dorsaint – backing vocals (9)
- Roger Ryan – backing vocals (9)
- Chris Willis – backing vocals (9)
- Chris Eaton – backing vocals (11), BGV arrangements (11)
- Nee-C Walls – backing vocals (13), BGV arrangements (13)

== Production ==
- Michael Blanton – executive producer
- Demetrus Stewart – executive producer
- CeCe Winans – executive producer
- Traci Sterling Bishir – production manager
- Michelle Bentrem – production management assistant
- Christiév Carothers – creative director
- Jan Cook – art direction
- Katherine Stratton – design
- Matthew Jordan Smith – photography
- Blanton & Harrell, Inc. – management

Technical

- Steve Hall – mastering at Future Disc (Hollywood, California)
- Danny Duncan – engineer (1, 2, 4, 10), additional engineer (6, 12)
- Tommy Sims – engineer (1, 2, 4)
- F. Reid Shippen – mixing (1–4, 6, 10, 12)
- Steve Bishir – engineer (3, 5–9, 11–13), mixing (5, 7–9, 11, 13)
- Scott Erikson – engineer (5)
- Dan Shike – mix assistant (1–4, 6, 10, 12)
- Hank Nirider – assistant engineer (3, 5–9, 11–13), mix assistant (5, 7–9, 11, 13)
- Jonathan Allen – string recording (5, 8, 9, 11, 12)
- Andrew Dudman – string recording assistant (5, 8, 9, 11, 12)

== Charts ==
Chart (2001)	Peak position
US Billboard 200	116
US Top Christian Albums (Billboard)	2
US Top Gospel Albums (Billboard)	2
US Top R&B/Hip-Hop Albums (Billboard)	48

== Certifications ==
Region	Certification	Certified units/sales
United States (RIAA)	Gold	500,000^{^}
^{^} Shipments figures based on certification alone.
