= Megan Basham =

American writer

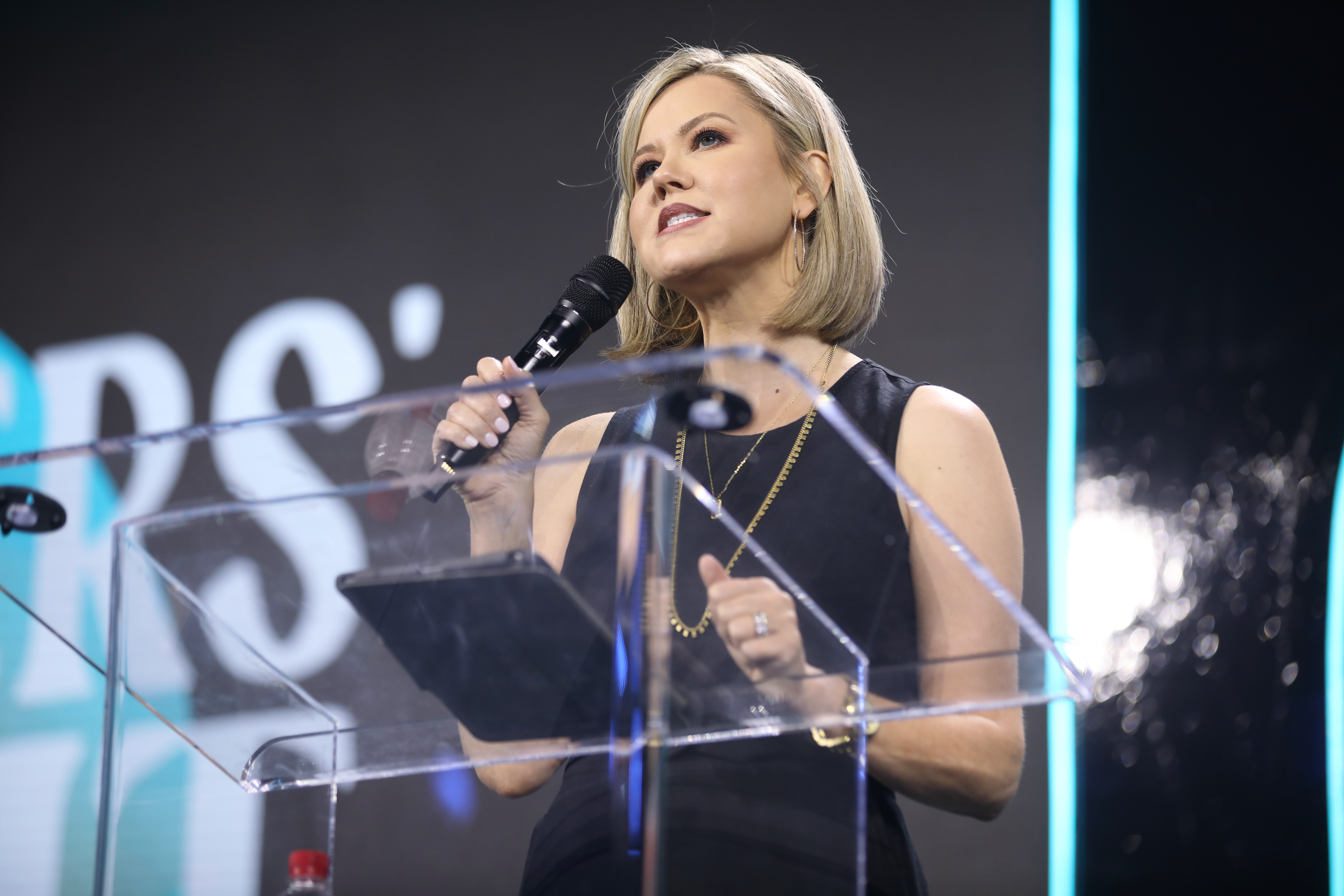
- Basham in 2024
- Education: Arizona State University
- Occupation: Reporter with The Daily Wire
- Spouse: Brian Basham
- Children: 2
- Website: The Daily Wire

Megan Basham is an American writer. She is a culture reporter for The Daily Wire, having previously served as film and television editor for World magazine.

Basham has written two books. The first was Beside Every Successful Man: Getting the Life You Want By Helping Your Husband Get Ahead (Crown Forum, 2009), in which Basham argued that women can achieve greater financial security for their families by quitting their jobs and applying their skills, education, and talent to advance their husbands' careers. Basham's second book was Shepherds for Sale: How Evangelical Leaders Traded the Truth for a Leftist Agenda (HarperCollins, 2024), in which she argued that evangelical leaders have been promoting left-wing views on various issues. The book sparked controversy upon its publication.

According to Joseph Holmes of Religion Unplugged, Basham is "widely known as a persistent online presence on social media, engaging in fiery exchanges on X." Mark Wingfield, writing for Baptist News Global, has argued that Basham is a "John MacArthur-like figure on the far right".

Basham was a 2022 Claremont Institute Lincoln Fellow. She received the 2024 Boniface Award from the Association of Classical Christian Schools for her "fearless and faithful journalism".

Basham is married with two children and lives in Charlotte, North Carolina. She was diagnosed with colorectal cancer in 2024.
