= Eight Days of Hanukkah (song) =

"Eight Days of Hanukka" is a song written by United States Senator Orrin Hatch and Madeline Stone, a Jewish songwriter from the Upper West Side of Manhattan who specializes in Christian music, at the suggestion of Jeffrey Goldberg. The song was first published on the web page of Tablet magazine.

The song was recorded by the singer Rasheeda Azar.
