= Kayla Parker =

American musician (1971–2007)

Kayla Denise Parker-Tolbert (June 29, 1971 – April 21, 2007) was an American gospel and R&B singer and songwriter.

As a songwriter, producer and background singer, she has worked with a number of gospel and R&B musicians, including CeCe, BeBe and Vickie Winans, Brandy, Anthony Hamilton, Michelle Williams of Destiny's Child and Mark Kibble of Take 6. Her television appearances included Oprah, Late Show with David Letterman and The Tonight Show with Jay Leno, and her songs were performed on Good Morning America, CNN, BET and TBN among others.

== Biography ==
She was born Kayla Denise Parker to Richard and Aseneth Parker on June 29, 1971, in Detroit, Michigan.

She showed an early interest in music, influenced by her father, a songwriter, producer and label executive who was discovered by Sam Cooke, and her mother, a jazz singer. After her parents' divorced, Kayla's mother bought her a piano, on which she would learn songs by the likes of DeBarge, Michael Jackson, the Clark Sisters, the Winans and Stevie Wonder.

Kayla became a Christian and continued to develop her musical ability as she served as an apprentice under the Minister of Music, Ted Thomas at Goodwill Community Chapel.

At Detroit's Pershing High School she formed an all-female vocal group, taking the name "God's Special Gift" after an audience member's compliment. The group won a talent show and went on to become widely known in the city's churches. As their fame spread, producer Michael Powell (Anita Baker) heard them and began working with them. At this point the group shortened their name to "Special Gift". Their recordings and performances, riding the strength of Kayla's songwriting, quickly earned them national recognition.

As a member of the National Convention of Gospel Choirs and Chorus (founded by Dr. Thomas A. Dorsey), Kayla's 1989 arrangement of "Since Jesus Came Into My Life" won the convention's nationwide competition for "Song of the Year". This arrangement was later included on the album Ron Winans Family and Friends Volume 3.

Kayla joined Perfecting Church, whose pastor was Marvin Winans, in 1990. Her song "Now Are We", performed by the Perfected Praise Choir, gained her national recognition.

A fan of Twinkie Clark, Kayla would listen to the Clark Sisters and try to play their music at the church piano between services. When Twinkie Clark left the Clark Sisters, Kayla was chosen as their first background singer, a slot she held for a year.

She worked with Mark Kibble of Take 6 on gospel's Grammy- and Stellar- award-winning Donnie McClurkin's first solo project. She did commercials with Fred Hammond and Eric Dawkins, wrote songs for Hammond's second album, and wrote the hit "Now Are We" for Marvin Winans and the Perfected Praise Choir.

She was also a background singer for BeBe Winans, traveling to Europe and performing on Oprah Winfrey's and Jay Leno's shows. She met superstar producer David Foster and sang on Brandy's record, then moved to California.

In 1999 Parker was diagnosed with cancer, and returned to Detroit for treatment and recovery. After overcoming the disease, she returned to California, where she threw herself back into songwriting and also learned to engineer her own recording sessions.

Working with a producer friend, she pulled together recordings of a number of her songs, both gospel and inspirational R&B - - "life music," she calls it - - and looked to develop her own artistry. Her material was also recorded by other artists: CeCe Winans recorded "He's Concerned About You," whose message of hope found a natural audience in the wake of Hurricane Katrina, and Vickie Winans recorded the hit single "It's Alright". Others including Rodney and Joy Jerkins and gospel jazz artist Tim Bowman have recorded material written by Parker.

In 2004, Kayla married David E. Tolbert.

Her music was played at the funeral of Coretta Scott King.

Kayla Parker died on April 21, 2007, from breast cancer. She is buried in Forest Lawn Cemetery in West Covina, CA.
