= Let Them Fall in Love =

Studio album by CeCe Winans
- Released: February 3, 2017
- Studios: Brooklyn Recording and The Bunker Studio (Brooklyn, New York): Blackbird Studios, Grand Victor Sound and Sputnik Sound (Nashville, Tennessee)
- Genres: Motown sound; Traditional Black gospel
- Length: 42:15
- Label: PureSprings Gospel: Thirty Tigers
- Producer: Alvin Love III: Tommy Sims

CeCe Winans chronology
Icon (2013)	Let Them Fall in Love (2017)	Something's Happening! A Christmas Album (2018)

Let Them Fall in Love is the ninth studio album by American singer CeCe Winans. As a CD, it was released by PureSprings Gospel and Thirty Tigers in 2016, but was available on digital platforms on February 3, 2017. The album won the 2018 Grammy Award for Best Gospel Album.

== Critical reception ==
Professional ratings
Review scores
Source	Rating
AllMusic	4/5 stars

AllMusic editor Andy Kellman called the album "a pleasant surprise from CeCe Winans. It's a retrofitted return that should appeal to anyone with an appreciation for Brill Building pop, early Motown, the Staple Singers, and Aretha Franklin circa "Amazing Grace" [...] Each song's message cuts clean through."

== Track listing ==
Taken from liner notes.

No.	Title	Writer(s)	Length
1.	"He's Never Failed Me Yet"	Alvin Love III	4:55
2.	"Run to Him"	Love; Dwan Hill	3:25
3.	"Hey Devil!" (featuring The Clark Sisters)	Love	4:02
4.	"Peace from God"	Love	3:46
5.	"Why Me"	Kris Kristofferson	3:26
6.	"Lowly"	Love	5:23
7.	"Never Have to Be Alone"	Love; Hill	3:47
8.	"Dancing in the Spirit" (featuring Hezekiah Walker and The Love Fellowship Choir)	Keith Chappel Laws; Lena Peachena Eure	4:34
9.	"Marvelous"	Hill	4:45
10.	"Let Them Fall in Love"	Love; CeCe Winans	4:12

== Personnel ==
- CeCe Wilson – vocals
- James Poyser – acoustic piano (1–4), Wurlitzer electric piano (3), organ (8)
- Daniel Weatherspoon – harpsichord (1, 2), clavinet (3), organ (3, 4)
- Dwan Hill – additional acoustic piano (2), Wurlitzer electric piano (5–7), organ (5, 6, 9, 10), acoustic piano (7, 9, 10)
- Gabe Dixon – acoustic piano (5, 6)
- Brad Williams – acoustic guitar (1, 2, 4, 8), electric guitar (1, 2, 4, 8)
- Nathan Dugger – additional acoustic guitar (2), acoustic guitar (5–7, 10), electric guitar (9, 10)
- Courtlan Clement – electric guitar (5, 6)
- Russ Pahl – pedal steel guitar (5, 6)
- Tommy Sims – bass (1–3, 8)
- Kyle Miles – upright bass (4)
- Rich Brinsfield – bass (5–7, 9, 10)
- James Turner – drums (1–4, 8)
- Robert "Spat" Searight – drums (5, 6)
- Marcus Hill – drums (9, 10)
- Javier Solis – percussion (1–4, 8)
- Eric Darken – orchestral percussion (1, 2, 4)
- Giovanni Rodriguez – percussion (5, 6)
- Jason Arce – horns (1, 2, 4, 8)
- Sylvester Onyejiaka – horns (1, 2, 4, 8)
- Dion Turner – horns (1, 2, 4, 8)
- Nick Marchione – horns (1, 2, 4, 8)
- The Nashville String Machine – strings (1–4, 7, 10)
- Philip Lassiter – orchestration and conductor (1–4), horn arrangements (8)
- Tim Akers – orchestration and conductor (7, 10)
- Bekka Bramlett – backing vocals (1, 2)
- Ayana George – backing vocals (1, 3)
- Sherry McGhee – backing vocals (1, 3)
- Wendy Moten – backing vocals (1, 2)
- Crystal Taliefero – backing vocals (1, 2)
- Ruby Amanfu – backing vocals (2)
- Debbie Winans-Lowe – backing vocals (2)
- The Clark Sisters – backing vocals (3)
- Gale Mayes – backing vocals (4, 6)
- Angela Primm – backing vocals (4, 6)
- Emoni Wilkins – backing vocals (4, 6)
- Molley Moody – backing vocals (7)
- Hezekiah Walker and The Love Fellowship Choir – choir (8)

Backing vocals on "Why Me" and "Marvelous"

- LaTasha Alford, Demetris Chaney-Perkins, Herlon Clark, Juanita Edwards, Victor Hannah, Shonte Johnson, Everett Miller, Stephanie Mosley, Kristi Rigby, Cedric Sesley, Demetria Slayden, Letrice Stanley, Dee Thomas, Geri Vaughn and Marcus Ware

Choir on "Let Them Fall In Love"

- Tim Akers – chorale arrangement
- Chase Akers, Billy Gaines, Gene Miller, Michael Mishaw, Peter Penrose, Joey Richey, Chris Rodriguez and Kevin Whalum – singers

=== Production ===
- Alvin Love III – producer
- Tommy Sims – producer (1–4, 8)
- Ben Kane – engineer (1–4, 8)
- Vance Powell – orchestra engineer (1–4), engineer (5–7)
- Jimmy Douglass – mixing (1–6, 8, 9)
- Dae Bennett – mixing (7, 10)
- Steve Marcia – BGV engineer (7)
- Drew Douthit – digital editing
- Tom Coyne – mastering at Sterling Sound (New York, NY)
- Derek Blanks – packaging design
- Jeremy Cowart – photography
- Quinn Ballard – booklet photography

== Charts ==
=== Weekly charts ===
Chart (2017)	Peak position
UK Christian & Gospel Albums (OCC)	10
US Billboard 200	103
US Independent Albums (Billboard)	6
US Top Gospel Albums (Billboard)	1

=== Year-end charts ===
Chart (2017)	Position
US Top Gospel Albums (Billboard)	7
