= David Taylor (rugby union, born 1880) =

- Full name: David Robertson Taylor
- Born: 26 October 1880 Comber, County Down, Ireland
- Died: 8 November 1941 (aged 61) Belfast, Northern Ireland

Rugby union career
- Position: Centre
International career
Years	Team	Apps	(Points)
1903	Ireland	1	(0)

David Robertson Taylor (26 October 1880 — 8 November 1941) was an Irish international rugby union player.

Born in Comber, County Down, Taylor was the son of Reverend David Alexander Taylor, who served as a moderator of the Presbyterian Church in Ireland, and attended Queen's College Belfast.

Taylor was a stalwart of the North Down Cricket Club, debuting for their first XI at age 16. He played in 10 NCU Challenge Cup title-winning sides with North Down and regularly represented Ulster.

A centre three-quarter, Taylor played varsity rugby during his time at Queen's College and was capped once for Ireland, playing a match against England at Lansdowne Road in 1903.

== See also ==
- List of Ireland national rugby union players
