= Alone in His Presence =

Studio album by CeCe Winans
- Released: September 28, 1995
- Studios: Father's Image; Sound Emporium Studios; Quad Studios Nashville; Bennett House (Franklin, Tennessee); Great Circle Sound
- Length: 48:11
- Label: Sparrow Records
- Producers: Cedric & Victor Caldwell; Greg Nelson; BeBe Winans

CeCe Winans chronology
Alone in His Presence (1995)	Everlasting Love (1998)

Alone in His Presence is the debut solo album by CeCe Winans released through Sparrow Records in 1995. It won a Grammy for Best Contemporary R&B Soul Album in 1996. "Every Time" and the self-penned "He's Always There" from the duo's album Relationships (1994) were promotional singles.

== Critical reception ==
Professional ratings
Review scores
Source	Rating
AllMusic	3/5 stars

John Bush of AllMusic wrote:

"The R&B grooves of her earlier recordings with The Winans' give way to a more string-oriented traditional gospel sound (exemplified by "Blessed Assurance" and "Great Is Thy Faithfulness") on her solo debut."

== Track listing ==
No.	Title	Writer(s)	Length
1.	"Overture"	Angie Winans; Cedric & Victor Caldwell	1:34
2.	"Alone in The Presence"	CeCe Winans; C. & V. Caldwell	4:06
3.	"I Surrender All"	Judson van de Venter; Winfield Weeden	5:29
4.	"Because of You"	Winans; C. & V. Caldwell	4:52
5.	"His Strength is Perfect"	Steven Curtis Chapman; Jerry Salley	4:36
6.	"Every Time"	Marvin Winans	4:08
7.	"Great is Thy Faithfulness" (with Delores "Mom" Winans)	Thomas Chisholm; William Runyan	5:00
8.	"Praise Medley"	Henry van Dyke Jr.; Ludwig van Beethoven; John Francis Wade; Bob McGee; Henry Smith; Arthur Tannous; Sybil Winans	5:01
9.	"Blessed Assurance"	Fanny Crosby; Phoebe Knapp	3:42
10.	"Blood Medley"	Andraé Crouch; Twila Paris	4:37
11.	"He's Always There" (from Relationships: BeBe & CeCe, 1994)	CeCe Winans; Madeline Stone	3:46
12.	"Alone in The Presence (Reprise)"		1:14
Total length:			48:11

== Charts ==
Chart performance for Alone in His Presence
Chart (1995)	Peak position
US Billboard 200	124
US Top Christian Albums (Billboard)	2
US Top Gospel Albums (Billboard)	2

== Certifications ==
Region	Certification	Certified units/sales
United States (RIAA)	Platinum	1,000,000^{^}
^{‡} Sales+streaming figures based on certification alone.
