= Throne Room (album) =

Studio album by CeCe Winans
- Released: September 9, 2003
- Length: 70:23
- Labels: Puresprings Gospel; Epic
- Producers: Cedric Caldwell; Victor Caldwell; Winans (co.)

CeCe Winans chronology
| CeCe Winans (2001) | Throne Room (2003) | Purified (2005) |

Throne Room is the sixth studio album by American gospel artist CeCe Winans. It was released by Puresprings Gospel and Epic Records on September 9, 2003 in the United States. "Hallelujah Praise" was the only single spawned from the release. After the release of the album, Winans embarked on a 25-city tour with Anointed that had no admission fees.

== Background ==
Winans had talked of a follow-up album to Alabaster Box but delayed in releasing it, upon finally recording the album, Winans stated:

"Worship is probably my favorite kind of music. For some time, I’ve really felt like God was telling me to record a very special project that would encourage people to worship. As I was completing the new record deal with Epic, I told them, ‘I’ve got to do this worship album before I can do anything else.’ It may make no natural sense to do this record right now in my career, but for the past two years I have had confirmation after confirmation that this is absolutely the right time. I know it’s all in God’s timing, and it’s what He wants me to do right now. If you are a worshipper this project will take you there, and if you’re not it will certainly give you peace."

== Critical reception ==
Professional ratings
Review scores
| Source | Rating |
|---|---|
| Allmusic | 4/5 stars |
| Christianity Today | 4/5 stars |
| Cross Rhythms | 8/10 stars |

AllMusic called the album "a breathy collection of lushly produced, accessible, unconditionally inspirational pop ballads with the lightest of R&B touches in a style equal parts Enya, Celine Dion, Karyn White, and Leonard Bernstein [...] The gentle, lulling sound remains constant throughout Throne Room, continuing the soulful gospel vocalist's own legacy."

== Track listing ==
Taken from liner notes.

Standard edition
| No. | Title | Writer(s) | Length |
|---|---|---|---|
| 1. | "Hallelujah to the King (Intro)" | Andraé Crouch | 1:09 |
| 2. | "Jesus, You're Beautiful" | Nathan Sabin | 4:54 |
| 3. | "Throne Room" | CeCe Winans; Crouch | 4:47 |
| 4. | "How Great Thou Art" | Stuart K. Hine | 6:17 |
| 5. | "You're So Holy" | Winans; Cedric & Victor Caldwell | 5:26 |
| 6. | "Oh Thou Most High" | Winans; The Caldwells | 3:36 |
| 7. | "By Thy Blood (Worthy is the Lamb)" | Winans; The Caldwells | 3:53 |
| 8. | "Hallelujah to the King" | Crouch | 4:02 |
| 9. | "Thirst for You" | John Ragsdale | 5:00 |
| 10. | "Come Fill My Heart" | Bruce Stevens; Lanette Crute; Tiffany Deonna Martin | 4:48 |
| 11. | "Mercy Said No" (Dedicated to Ronald Winans) | Gregory Long; Dave Allen Clark; Donald Koch | 5:00 |
| 12. | "All in Your Name" | Carvin Winans; Dana Davis | 5:02 |
| 13. | "No One Else" | CeCe Winans; The Caldwells | 3:48 |
| 14. | "Hallelujah Praise" | Winans; The Caldwells | 4:09 |
| 15. | "Just Like You, Jesus" | Winans; The Caldwells | 4:45 |
| 16. | "A Heart Like Yours" | Winans; The Caldwells | 3:39 |

2017 digital edition

| No. | Title | Writer(s) | Length |
|---|---|---|---|
| 17. | "Blessed Assurance" | Fanny Crosby; Phoebe Knapp | 3:33 |

Notes

- The first 1,000 copies of Throne Room were issued with a DVD that contained exclusive interviews, behind-the-scenes moments, live performances, and the "More Than What I Wanted" music video.

== Charts ==
| Chart (2003) | Peak position |
|---|---|
| US Billboard 200 | 32 |
| US Top Christian Albums (Billboard) | 1 |
| US Top Gospel Albums (Billboard) | 1 |
| US Top R&B/Hip-Hop Albums (Billboard) | 21 |

== Certifications ==
| Region | Certification | Certified units/sales |
|---|---|---|
| United States (RIAA) | Gold | 500,000^{^} |
^{^} Shipments figures based on certification alone.
