= Alabaster Box (album) =

Studio album by CeCe Winans
- Released: October 19, 1999
- Studios: Face To Face Studios (Southfield, Mississippi): Dark Horse Recording and Fun Attic Studio (Franklin, Tennessee); Ocean Way Recording, Vertical Sound Studio and Bridgeway Studios (Nashville, Tennessee); Tribe Studio (Van Nuys, California)
- Genres: Funk; Soul; Gospel
- Length: 45:30
- Label: WellSpring Gospel
- Producers: Winans (exec.); Alvin Love (exec.); Cedric & Victor Caldwell; Cedric Dent; Fred Hammond; Mark Kibble; David Thomas; Chris Harris

CeCe Winans chronology
His Gift (1998)	Alabaster Box (1999)	CeCe Winans (2001)

Alabaster Box is the fourth studio album by American singer CeCe Winans. It was released by WellSpring Gospel on October 19, 1999 in the United States. Her debut release on WellSpring, her own label, Winans described it as an "experimental" album for the label before any new artists were signed. It included a duet with Take 6, which was included in their compilation album Greatest Hits (1999). Gospel artist Fred Hammond also took a production turn on the album. It was nominated for a Grammy in 2001 for Best Contemporary Soul Gospel Album, but lost to Mary Mary's Thankful (2000).

== Critical reception ==
Professional ratings
Review scores
Source	Rating
Allmusic	4/5 stars

Allmusic editor Steve Huey found that Alabaster Box is "a return to [Winans'] gospel roots, in contrast to the straight-ahead urban soul of Everlasting Love, and it's a triumphant one. Winans sounds invigorated by the spiritual material, delivering committed performances and commanding vocals. The production sounds very contemporary, if a little slick at times, but that's not likely to bother most fans. Alabaster Box is an excellent album from a terrific talent."

== Track listing ==
No.	Title	Writer(s)	Producer(s)	Length
1.	"Fill My Cup" (Intro)	Richard Blanchard		0:51
2.	"King of Kings (He's a Wonder)"	CeCe Winans; Fred Hammond	Hammond	4:24
3.	"It Wasn't Easy"	Winans; Christopher Harris	Harris	4:48
4.	"Alabaster Box"	Janice Sjostrand	Harris	5:32
5.	"Comforter"	Randy Phillips	Harris	4:42
6.	"Love of My Heart"	Winans; Hammond	Hammond	4:17
7.	"Without Love"	Winans; Hammond	Hammond	3:54
8.	"He's Not on His Knees Yet"	Allen Shamblin; Madeline Stone	Harris	3:10
9.	"One and the Same" (featuring Take 6)	Kyle Matthews; Pete Carlson	Cedric Dent; David Thomas; Mark Kibble	4:20
10.	"Higher Place of Praise"	Winans; Hammond	Hammond	3:51
11.	"Blessed, Broken & Given"	Lari A. Goss	Cedric Caldwell; Victor Caldwell	4:54
12.	"King of Kings (He's a Wonder)" (Reprise)	Winans; Hammond	Hammond	4:01

== Personnel ==
- CeCe Winans – vocals, backing vocals (7)
- Fred Hammond – keyboards (2, 6, 12), bass guitar (2, 6, 10, 12), drum programming (2, 6, 12), backing vocals (6, 7, 10), acoustic guitar (7)
- Kent Hooper – programming (3)
- Michael Linney – programming (3), drum programming (5)
- Jeff Roach – programming (3, 5)
- Tom Howard – acoustic piano (4, 8), string arrangements (4, 8)
- Noel Hall – additional keyboards (6, 10), organ (6)
- Tommie Walker – keyboards (7, 10), drum programming (7, 10)
- Cedric Caldwell – instruments (11)
- Victor Caldwell – instruments (11)
- Darryl Dixon – acoustic guitar (2, 7, 12)
- George Cocchini – guitars (3, 5)
- Dan Needham – drums (3)
- Marvin McQuitty – live drums (6)
- Donald Hayes – saxophone (6)
- Carl Gorodetzky – string leader (4, 8)
- The Nashville String Machine – strings (4, 8)
- Resa Bell – backing vocals (2, 6, 7, 10, 12)
- Bricie Byars – backing vocals (2, 6, 7, 10, 12)
- Miautra Dias – backing vocals (2, 6, 7, 10, 12)
- PamKeynon M. Donald – backing vocals (2, 6, 7, 10, 12)
- Sherri Edwards – backing vocals (2, 6, 7, 10, 12)
- LaShonda Lewis – backing vocals (2, 6, 7, 10, 12)
- Tamika Lucas – backing vocals (2, 6, 7, 10, 12)
- Yoshawndala Parker – backing vocals (2, 6, 7, 10, 12)
- Cynthia Pasley – backing vocals (2, 6, 7, 10, 12)
- Bryan Pratt – backing vocals (2, 6, 7, 10, 12)
- Frederick J. Purifoy II – backing vocals (2, 6, 7, 10, 12)
- Lisa Cochran – backing vocals (3, 5)
- Ron Hemby – backing vocals (3, 5)
- Marabeth Jordan – backing vocals (3, 5)
- Christopher Harris – backing vocals (5)
- Jan Harris – backing vocals (5)
- Brooklyn Tabernacle Choir – choir (5)
- Carol Cymbala – choir director (5)
- Take 6 – vocals (9)

=== Production ===
- Alvin Love – executive producer, management
- CeCe Winans – executive producer, A&R coordinator
- Fred Hammond – recording (2, 6, 7, 10, 12), mixing (2, 6, 7, 10, 12)
- Ray Hammond – recording (2, 6, 7, 10, 12), mixing (2, 6, 7, 10, 12)
- James "JB" Baird – engineer (3-5, 8)
- Robert "Void" Caprio – engineer (3, 5)
- Tom Laune – mixing (3-5, 8)
- Todd Robbins – engineer (5)
- Les Pierce – recording (9)
- David Thomas – recording (9)
- Marcelo Pennell – engineer (9)
- Marcus Eason – assistant engineer (2, 6, 7, 10, 12)
- Kevin Wilson – assistant engineer (2, 6, 7, 10, 12)
- Rob Evans – assistant engineer (3)
- PamKeynon M. Donald – production administration (2, 6, 7, 10, 12)
- PJ Heimmerman – production manager (3-5, 8)
- Dion Velasquez – production manager (3-5, 8)
- Karen Philpott – design
- Michael Gomez – photography
- C.W. Wellspring Entertainment – management

== Charts ==
Chart (1999)	Peak position
US Billboard 200	129
US Top Christian Albums (Billboard)	5
US Top Gospel Albums (Billboard)	1
US Top R&B/Hip-Hop Albums (Billboard)	55

== Certifications ==
Region	Certification	Certified units/sales
United States (RIAA)	Gold	500,000^{^}
^{^} Shipments figures based on certification alone.
