= Thy Kingdom Come (CeCe Winans album) =

Studio album by CeCe Winans
- Released: April 1, 2008
- Genre: Gospel
- Length: 71:52
- Labels: PureSprings Gospel; EMI Gospel
- Producers: Percy Bady; Christopher Capeheart (exec.); Cedric & Victor Caldwell; Luther "Mano" Hanes; Tommy Sims; Brannon Tunie (co); Alvin Love III (co); Demetrus Stewart (exec.)

CeCe Winans chronology
Purified (2005)	Thy Kingdom Come (2008)	For Always... The Best of CeCe Winans (2010)

Singles from Thy Kingdom Come
- 1. "Thy Will Be Done" Released: January 1, 2008; 2. "Waging War" Released: March 4, 2008

Thy Kingdom Come is the eighth studio album by American singer CeCe Winans. It was released by PureSprings Gospel and EMI Gospel on April 1, 2008. The album reached number 57 on the US Billboard 200, number 12 on the Top R&B/Hip-Hop Albums, and number one on the Top Gospel Albums charts. Thy Kingdom Come received the Best Pop/Contemporary Gospel Album award at the 51st Grammy Awards in 2009.

== Background ==
Winans originally intended to release a collection of Hymnals entitled Hymns At Heart which was set for release in November 2007, however, the release date was postponed indefinitely. On January 22, 2008, Winans posted on her blog that she would be releasing an album on April 1, 2008. News outlets began reporting in February that the studio album would be called Thy Kingdom Come and featured the song "Waging War".

== Singles ==
The lead single for the album, "Thy Will Be Done", was released digitally on the iTunes Store on January 1, 2008. The second single, "Waging War", was released on March 4, 2008, peaking at number 12 on the Hot Gospel Songs chart. "It Ain't Over", the album's third single, was released around August 2008.

== Critical reception ==
Professional ratings
Review scores
Source	Rating
AllMusic	3.5/5 stars

AllMusic editor Andree Farias found that "the album is one of the churchiest the singer has released yet [...] Thy Kingdom Come sees Winans doing justice to her family name and singing almost exclusively for the saints – songs of praise, songs of encouragement, songs of worship, songs of inspiration. But the fact that this is an album for the church doesn't mean it sounds like Sunday morning [...] As is expected of Winans, the songs are expertly produced, the ballads are beautifully orchestrated, the urban pieces are as urban as Whitney in her prime. In other words, Thy Kingdom Come is precisely what a CeCe album should sound like, which isn't to say she's settling for the middle road."

== Track listing ==
No.	Title	Writer(s)	Length
1.	"We Welcome You (Holy Father)"	Tommy Sims	4:58
2.	"Forever"	CeCe Winans	4:30
3.	"Thy Will Be Done"	Sims	5:22
4.	"Worthy"	Winans; Sims	5:23
5.	"It Ain't Over"	Percy Bady	6:04
6.	"Waging War"	Christopher Capehart; Brannon Tunie; Winans	5:21
7.	"The Test of Time"	Luther "Mano" Hanes	6:15
8.	"I'll Live for You"	Capehart; Tunie; Winans	4:56
9.	"Bless His Holy Name"	Hanes; Winans	4:32
10.	"Oh Holy Place"	Capehart; Tunie; Winans	4:56
11.	"You're the One"	Hanes; Winans	4:51
12.	"The Coast is Clear"	Alvin Love III	4:54
13.	"Falling in Love"	Winans	3:47
14.	"Million Miles"	Sims; Anthony Skinner	5:53

Notes

- ^{^[a]} denotes a co-producer

== Charts ==
=== Weekly charts ===
Chart (2008)	Peak position
US Billboard 200	57
US Top Christian Albums (Billboard)	2
US Top Gospel Albums (Billboard)	1
US Top R&B/Hip-Hop Albums (Billboard)	12

=== Year-end charts ===
Chart (2008)	Position
US Top Gospel Albums (Billboard)	7

== Awards ==
The album was nominated for a Dove Award for Contemporary Gospel Album of the Year at the 40th GMA Dove Awards.
