= David S. Taylor =

American business executive (born 1958)

David Taylor
- Born: David Scott Taylor; April 20, 1958 (age 68); Charlotte, North Carolina, U.S.
- Education: Duke University (BS)
- Occupations: Chairman, Delta Air Lines

David Scott Taylor (born April 20, 1958) is an American business executive who is the chairman of Delta Air Lines. He served as the executive chairman of Procter & Gamble from 2021 to 2022, having previously been chairman, president and CEO.

== Early life ==
David Taylor was born in Charlotte, North Carolina, United States, and graduated from Duke University in 1980 with a B.S. in electrical engineering.

== Career ==
Upon graduation, he joined Procter & Gamble as a production manager. Taylor spent the first decade of his career in P&G's Product Supply organization, where he managed production and operations at a number of plants, eventually managing P&G's manufacturing plant in Mehoopany, Pennsylvania. This experience gave him hands-on understanding of manufacturing, logistics, engineering, and supply chain operations.

In the early 1990s, Taylor was transferred to the brand management department, his first assignment being Pampers—P&G's largest brand. Since then, he has held leadership roles spanning a number of P&G businesses, including Baby Care, Hair Care, Family Care, and Home Care in which he expanded businesses across North America, Western Europe, and Asia. He also led P&G's Greater China hair care business for nearly four years.

Taylor was group president of P&G's Beauty Sector and P&G's Grooming and Health Care Sector which included the brands of Crest, Oral-B, Pantene, Head & Shoulders, Olay, SK-II, Gillette, Fusion, Mach 3, and Vicks.

According to The Economist, as CEO, Taylor is “thought to be moving P&G in the right direction (albeit too slowly for investors’ taste).”

In January 2019, Taylor said in Switzerland: "The world would be a better place if my board of directors on down is represented by 50% of the women. We sell our products to more than 50% of the women." The Wall Street Journal noted the company's board of directors has more than twice as many men as it does women.

In August 2019, Taylor was appointed a member of the Delta Air Lines board of directors. He currently serves as Chairman of the board.

== Outside interests ==
Earlier in his career, Taylor was vice chair of the Greater China Quality Brand Protection Committee, a collaboration between top companies and the Chinese government. He has been a director of P&G's joint venture with Clorox. Taylor was on the board of directors for Feeding America for eight years, including two years as board chair. He continues to be a member of the Cincinnati Freestore Foodbank. In addition, Taylor is a member of the board of visitors at Duke University's Fuqua School of Business.
