= Everlasting Love (CeCe Winans album) =

Studio album by CeCe Winans
- Released: March 17, 1998
- Studios: Studio 56; Westlake Recording Studios; Studio LaCoco; The House; The Dugout; Seventeen Grand; Sound Stage; Sixteenth Ave Sound; Aire LA Studios; Father's Image; Downtown Studios (Johannesburg); Silent Sound Recording Studios; Doppler Studios; Capitol Studios; Chung King Studios
- Length: 56:00
- Labels: Sparrow Records; Pioneer; Atlantic Records (US edition)
- Producers: Winans; Cedric & Victor Caldwell; ChakDaddy; E. Dawk; Babyboy; Lauryn Hill; Daryl Simmons; Tony Rich; Keith Crouch; Tommy Sims; Sibusiso Victor Masando

CeCe Winans chronology
| Alone in His Presence (1995) | Everlasting Love (1998) | His Gift (1998) |

Singles from Everlasting Love
- 1. "Well, Alright" Released: 1998

Everlasting Love is the second album by CeCe Winans released in 1998 under Sparrow Records and Pioneer (Atlantic Records in the US) after her Grammy Award-winning Alone in His Presence (1995). "Well, Alright" was the only single spawned from the release, peaking at number 9 on the Billboard Bubbling Under Hot 100 Singles chart. "What About You", "Slippin'", and the double A-side "I Am/Come On Back Home" were released as promo singles.

== Critical reception ==
Stephen Thomas Erlewine from AllMusic wrote: "Cece [...] decided to record a full-fledged urban R&B/soul album, enlisting an impressive array of guest artists and collaborators [...] to record Everlasting Love. All of the guest stars do nothing but enhance [her] talents. There is no doubt this is her record, and she breathes life even into the weaker material. Fortunately, there isn't much that's weak [...]. The songwriting is consistently classy, the production is polished without being slick, and [her] voice simply soars. The only gospel inflections that remain are in her singing, as all of the songs, with the exception of Hill's direct, affecting "On That Day," have a distinct contemporary flavor. It's to [her] credit that she flourishes in this setting and makes the album as personal as her gospel album Alone in His Presence."

Professional ratings
Review scores
| Source | Rating |
|---|---|
| AllMusic | 4.5/5 stars |

== Track listing ==
| No. | Title | Writer(s) | Length |
|---|---|---|---|
| 1. | "Well, Alright" | Winans; John "Jubu" Smith; Keith Crouch | 4:16 |
| 2. | "Life" | Chaka Blackmon; Eric Dawkins; Stephen Brown; Tynetta Hare | 4:07 |
| 3. | "What About You" | Winans; Tony Rich | 4:15 |
| 4. | "Everlasting Love" | Tommy Sims | 4:38 |
| 5. | "I Am" | Winans; Smith; Crouch | 4:17 |
| 6. | "Slippin'" | Winans; Deconzo Smith; Sylvia Bennett-Smith | 4:31 |
| 7. | "The Wind" | Sims | 4:46 |
| 8. | "Come On Back Home" | Winans; Cedric & Victor Caldwell | 4:06 |
| 9. | "Feel The Spirit" | Winans; C. & V. Caldwell | 4:02 |
| 10. | "The Healing Part" | Brock Walsh; Jamie Houston | 3:59 |
| 11. | "Listen With Your Heart" | Diane Warren | 4:38 |
| 12. | "On That Day" | Lauryn Hill | 4:00 |
| 13. | "Just Come" | Winans; Madeline Stone | 3:57 |
| Total length: | | | 56:00 |

== Charts ==
Chart performance for Everlasting Love
| Chart (1998) | Peak position |
|---|---|
| US Billboard 200 | 107 |
| US Top Christian Albums (Billboard) | 2 |
| US Top Gospel Albums (Billboard) | 1 |
| US Top R&B/Hip-Hop Albums (Billboard) | 35 |
