= His Gift =

Studio album by CeCe Winans
- Released: September 15, 1998
- Studios: Face To Face Studios, Southfield, MI; Ocean Way Studios, Nashville, TN; Scotland Yard Studios, Los Angeles, CA; Scotland Yarkd Studios, L.A; Tejas Studio, Franklin, TN
- Genres: Gospel; R&B
- Length: 44:39
- Labels: Pioneer Music Group; Sparrow Records; Atlantic Records (US edition)
- Producers: Fred Hammond; Stephen "Steve" Harvey Jr.; David Pack; Winans (exec.); Charlie Lico (exec.)

CeCe Winans chronology
Everlasting Love (1998)	His Gift (1998)	Alabaster Box (1999)

His Gift is the third studio album and first Christmas album by American singer CeCe Winans, released in 1998 by Pioneer Music Group and Sparrow Records (Atlantic Records in the US). The album peaked at No. 3 on the US Billboard Top Gospel Albums chart and No. 17 on the US Billboard Top Christian Albums chart.

== Critical reception ==
Professional ratings
Review scores
Source	Rating
AllMusic	3/5 stars

Stephen Erlewine of AllMusic, in a 3/5 star review, wrote "[...] CeCe Winans' His Gift is a charming holiday record, thanks to her rich voice and elegant phrasing. [...] For fans of Winans, or contemporary gospel in general, His Gift is a very appealing Christmas record."

== Track listing ==
No.	Title	Writer(s)	Length
1.	"He's Brought Joy to the World"	Noel Hall; Fred Hammond; Kim Rutherford	04:02
2.	"Oh Holy Night"	Traditional	04:35
3.	"Glory to the King"	Tim Thomas	04:10
4.	"Let's Celebrate Christmas"	CeCe Winans; Stephen "Steve" Harvey Jr.	04:08
5.	"Do You Hear What I Hear?"	Noël Regney; Gloria Shayne	05:15
6.	"What a Child" (with BeBe Winans)	Roger Ryan; Winans	04:37
7.	"Go Tell It on the Mountain"	John Wesley Work Jr.; Ronn Huff	04:00
8.	"Away in a Manger"	Ryan	04:24
9.	"Christmas Star"	Kimmie Rhodes; Kevin Savigar	05:02
10.	"We Wish You a Merry Christmas"	Traditional	04:26
