= Vicki Yohe =

American singer-songwriter (born 1965)

- Born: July 13, 1965 (age 61); Normal, Illinois, U.S.
- Genres: Contemporary Christian, gospel
- Occupations: Singer, songwriter
- Instrument: Vocals
- Years active: 1984–present
- Labels: Giant, Pure Springs Gospel
- Website: vickiyohe.org

Vicki Yohe (born July 13, 1965) is a gospel singer, songwriter, and worship leader. She was born in Normal, Illinois and raised in Rapid City, South Dakota. She sang her first solo at the age of five. Her family moved to Hammond, Louisiana when she was 14. At age 19, she accepted the position of music director at a church near Baton Rouge.

== Career ==
In 1992, she recorded her self-titled independent debut album. This brought the attention of Giant Records, who signed her in 1994. She is best known for the songs "The Mercy Seat" and "Because Of Who You Are"—for which she received a Dove Award nomination, and for regularly performing on TBN's Praise the Lord program. It was through her television appearance that CeCe Winans offered her the chance to sign with Winans' new Pure Springs Gospel label. Yohe's first release from the label was 2003's I Just Want You.

=== Controversy over support of Donald Trump ===
In January 2017, in response to the Women's March in Washington, DC, Yohe posted a meme to her Instagram account, a photo of an actor dressed as Jesus carrying suitcases with the words, "On my way back to the White House." She added comments in support of Donald Trump, saying that marches and protests would be ineffective, and that "You know you are doing something right when there is so much opposition!!!".^{*} The post attracted immediate criticism from her predominantly-Black followers and from activist Shaun King; Yohe soon shut down most of her social media presence and posted an apology to Facebook, saying that she "never want[ed] to ever hurt anyone and that has never been [her] intention," but that she felt that Barack Obama's policies as president "many times went against what most Christians believe". She wrote that many churches had canceled ministry events with her, and that she had been called a racist for her support of Trump.

== Discography ==
- 1992: Vicki Yohe
- 1994: Everlasting Love
- 1995: I Give You Me
- 1997: He Knows My Heart
- 2000: The Best of Vicki Yohe
- 2000: Christmas Presence
- 2001: Beyond This Song
- 2003: I Just Want You
- 2005: He's Been Faithful
- 2009: Reveal Your Glory: Live from the Cathedral (CD & DVD)
- 2011: I'm at Peace
- 2013: Free Worshiper

== Accolades ==
- 2004: GMA Dove Award nomination for Contemporary Gospel Recorded Song of the Year for "Because of Who You Are"
- 2006: Stellar Award nomination for the album He's Been Faithful

== Notes ==
- . Triple exclamation points in original
