= MinistryWatch =

Watchdog organization

- Formation: 1998; 27 years ago
- Founder: Rusty and Carol Leonard
- Legal status: Nonprofit 501(c)(3)
- Headquarters: Matthews, North Carolina
- President: Warren Cole Smith
- Chairman: Tim Burns
- Website: ministrywatch.com

MinistryWatch is an independent American evangelical Christian organization that evaluates protestant ministries for financial accountability and transparency, and to provide independent advice to individuals considering making donations to these ministries.

MinistryWatch posts daily journalism related to Christian ministries at its website.

== Media appearances ==
MinistryWatch was founded by Howard "Rusty" Leonard and gained national attention when it was featured on ABC News' 20/20 in 2007. The segment focused on various organizations' use of donor funds. Leonard, along with current MinistryWatch president Warren Cole Smith, has continued to appear in prominent media outlets, including The Washington Post, NPR, WORLD Magazine, Christianity Today, Religion News Service, NBC News, and Bloomberg News, discussing issues related to ministry transparency and financial practices.

== Positions on issues related to Christian ministries ==
MinistryWatch has publicly advocated for reform in the Christian nonprofit sector. Specifically, it advocates that all Christian ministries release their Form 990s to the public. It has also been an outspoken opponent of the use of non-disclosure agreements (NDAs) in Christian ministry settings.
