= Baptist News Global =

American news agency (2014-)

Baptist News Global is a Baptist news agency. It is a Cooperative Baptist Fellowship partner.

== History ==
It was founded in 2014 as a merger of Associated Baptist Press (ABP) and the Religious Herald.

The Herald was founded in 1828 by the Baptist General Association of Virginia. Associated Baptist Press was founded by Baptist journalists as an autonomous self-supporting entity in 1990, shortly after the Cooperative Baptist Fellowship split from the Southern Baptist Convention.
