= Madeline Stone =

American songwriter

Madeline Stone is an American songwriter.

Stone, who is Jewish, lives on the Upper West Side of Manhattan and specializes in Inspirational music.

Stone was born in Brooklyn, and reared on Long Island. She is a graduate of Syracuse University in music education, and holds a master's degree in music therapy from Goddard College.

She is best known for her Inspirational music, such as "It's in God's Hands Now," co-written with Allen Shamblin. She also has written hits for country, pop, and R&B singers. These include Billy Gilman, CeCe Winans, Jaci Velasquez, Steve Holy, Jane Zhang, Ray Charles, Melba Moore, Wilson Phillips, Alannah Myles and United States Senator Orrin Hatch. She had sung in the movies Oceans 12 and Stuart Little and recently the American Fango.

She wrote for Sony Music for 15 years and was also signed to Warner Brothers.
