= CeCe Winans =

American gospel singer (born 1964)

Pastor CeCe Winans
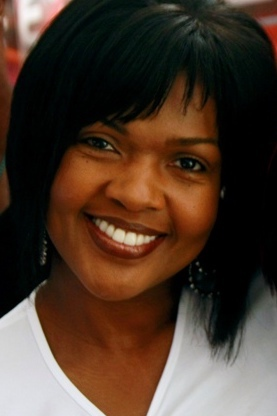
- Winans in concert in Lagos, Nigeria, December 2009

Background information
- Born: Priscilla Marie Winans; October 8, 1964 (age 62); Detroit, Michigan, U.S.
- Genres: Gospel; contemporary Christian; R&B; worship; contemporary gospel
- Occupation: Singer
- Years active: 1978–present
- Labels: Sparrow Records; PMG/Atlantic Records; PureSprings Gospel
- Formerly of: BeBe & CeCe Winans, The Winans
- Spouse: Alvin Love II
- Website: cecewinans.com

Priscilla Marie Love (née Winans) (born October 8, 1964), known professionally by her stage name as CeCe Winans (/ˈwaɪnænz/), is an American gospel singer who has received 18 Grammy Awards, the most for any female gospel singer; 36 GMA Dove Awards, 28 Stellar Awards, 7 NAACP Image Awards, 6 Billboard Music Awards, and many other awards and honors including being one of the inaugural inductees into the Black Music & Entertainment Walk of Fame in Atlanta. She is the best-selling and most awarded female gospel singer of all time, and has a star on the Hollywood Walk of Fame and on the Music City Walk of Fame in downtown Nashville.

Winans has 19 million record sales certified by RIAA, making her one of the best-selling gospel music artists. She first rose to prominence during the 1980s as a member of the double platinum selling gospel duo BeBe & CeCe Winans with her brother, BeBe Winans, before launching her own solo career. Billboard magazine lists all of her solo albums as top Gospel, Christian, and R&B music sellers, and six albums as a duo with her older brother BeBe.

== Early life ==
Priscilla Marie Winans was born in Detroit to Delores and David Winans of the famed Winans Family gospel group, on October 8, 1964. She is one of 10 children. Her parents were in the Church of God in Christ and only listened to gospel music. She sang her first solo at the age of eight.

== Duo with BeBe Winans ==
Winans first went to Charlotte, North Carolina in 1981 as a singer on the Christian telecast The PTL Club, hosted by Jim and Tammy Faye Bakker. While originally part of the larger Winans family singing group, CeCe and her older brother BeBe became a duo during their time at PTL, in response to positive reactions to their version of the song "Up Where We Belong" sung as a duet, with lyrics changed for Christian audiences. In 1984, CeCe and BeBe released their first album, Lord Lift Us Up, for PTL Records. They achieved crossover success, eventually releasing nine Gold and Platinum recordings, billed as BeBe & CeCe Winans. CeCe left PTL in 1984 just before getting married. Her brother left in 1985. They released their second album in 1987: BeBe & CeCe Winans. BeBe & CeCe Winans are the first gospel artists to have their album Different Lifestyles sell more than a million units, only the second gospel album to do that after Amazing Grace by Aretha Franklin.

== Solo career ==
CeCe Winans began her solo career with the album Alone in His Presence, released in 1995. It was only the third album by a gospel artist to sell more than a million units. CeCe, along with her brother BeBe, also hold the honor of having the first gospel album to reach platinum by a gospel artist. "Alone In His Presence" earned her a Grammy Award and two Dove Awards, including the Female Vocalist of the Year. Winans's next release, the Gold-certified Everlasting Love, was released in 1998 and featured Winans' highest-charting solo singles: "Well Alright" and "Slippin". The song "On That Day" from the album was written and produced by R&B singer Lauryn Hill. Later in 1998, Winans released His Gift; a Christmas album.

In 1999, Winans started her own recording company, PureSprings Gospel. Her first album on the label was Alabaster Box in 1999. Some production was done by gospel singer and musician Fred Hammond. It included a guest appearance by Take 6. In 2000 she released a concert VHS titled Live at the Lambs Theater in New York. The concert contained songs from her previous albums. Winans released her next album, the self-titled CeCe Winans, in 2001. The single "Anybody Wanna Pray" included a guest appearance by GRITS. The second single, "Say A Prayer" crossed over into the Contemporary Christian music market.

Winans took a two-year break from releasing music and returned in 2003 with Throne Room. The first 1,000 copies were issued with a bonus CD that contained exclusive interviews with the artist, the making of the CD, some touring footage, and the music video "More Than What I Wanted" (which came from the 2001 release). In 2004, the 25-city tour Throne Room with the group Anointed featured free admission and was followed with a DVD release of the concert recorded in Tennessee. Live in the Throne Room contained tracks from all of Winans's albums. Around September 2004, she had what she thought was flu but turned out to be a serious stomach infection and was hospitalized immediately for surgery. Due to an extended recovery time, the second half of the Throne Room Tour was postponed to early 2005.

Winans' seventh album Purified was released in 2005. Her nephew Mario Winans was one of four producers. Her son Alvin III co-wrote several songs on the album, and her younger sisters Angie and Debbie performed. CeCe Winans' collection of Top Ten R&B radio hits includes "Count On Me", her duet with Whitney Houston, from the Waiting to Exhale soundtrack. The single was certified Gold in the US and reached No. 8 on the Billboard Hot 100, No. 4 on the Adult Contemporary chart, and No. 8 on the Billboard R&B Singles chart.

Winans released her eighth album, Thy Kingdom Come on April 1, 2008, featuring the single "Waging War". On October 6, 2009, a BeBe & CeCe reunion album named Still was released by Malaco Records, and features collaborations with Marvin Winans and contemporary gospel sister duo Mary Mary. On December 23, 2010, Winans, along with BeBe and Mary Mary, featuring the West Angeles Choir, performed on The Tonight Show with Jay Leno. From 2012 to 2014, Winans was a judge on BET's gospel singing competition Sunday Best, along with her brother BeBe.

In 2017, Winans released a tenth album, Let Them Fall in Love, for which she won two Grammy Awards for Best Gospel Performance/Song and Best Gospel Album. In 2021 she released her first live worship album, Believe for It, which won her three additional Grammy Awards (including Best Gospel Album) in April 2022. Her latest single called "Goodness of God" debuted on September 14, 2022. On April 26, 2024, CeCe Winans released her most anticipated second live album 'More Than This' which went to number one on Billboard Top Gospel Album Charts, Top Christian Album charts, while the single 'That's My King' shot to number one on the Hot Gospel charts and the 1 Gospel Streaming Song. To promote her album, she appeared and sang on The Kelly Clarkson Show, The Jennifer Hudson Show, and on the season finale of American Idol singing 'Goodness of God' with contestant Roman Collins.

Her 2024 Album "More Than This" won Best Gospel Album at the 67th Grammy Awards 2025. She also won for Best Contemporary Christian Music Performance / Song at the 67th Grammy Award with a song titled "That's My King." 2024 also saw Winans host a documentary released by Our Daily Bread Ministries entitled 'The Carols of Christmas', together with Michael W. Smith and Drew & Ellie Holcomb.

In 2026, CeCe Winans was awarded her 18th Grammy for Best Gospel Performance/Song for her song Come Jesus Come which featured Gospel legend Shirley Caesar.

== Books ==
Winans has written four books: "On A Positive Note", a memoir released August 1, 2000; "Throne Room: Ushered Into the Presence of God", a devotional released January 1, 2004, and co-authored with Claire Cloninger; "Always Sisters: Becoming the Princess You Were Created to Be", released on July 17, 2007, co-written with Claudia Mair Burney; and most recently, "Believe For It: Passing on Faith to the Next Generation", released and published in 2024.

== Personal life ==
Winans lives in Brentwood, Tennessee, a suburb of Nashville, with her husband Alvin Love II. They have two children, a son and a daughter. In 2012, CeCe and her husband became the founding pastors of Nashville Life Church in Nashville.

Winans was a close friend of Whitney Houston and godmother to her daughter, Bobbi Kristina Brown. On February 18, 2012, Winans performed the songs "Don't Cry for Me" and "Jesus Loves Me" at Houston's funeral, at New Hope Baptist Church in Newark, New Jersey.

== Discography ==
See also BeBe & CeCe Winans discography

- Alone in His Presence (1995)
- Everlasting Love (1998)
- His Gift (1998)
- Alabaster Box (1999)
- CeCe Winans (2001)
- Throne Room (2003)
- Purified (2005)
- Thy Kingdom Come (2008)
- Let Them Fall in Love (2017)
- Something's Happening! A Christmas Album (2018)
- Believe for It (2021)
- More Than This (2024)
- Joyful Joyful (2024)
- The Hymns (2026)

== Videography ==
=== Concert ===
Live at the Lambs Theater in New York (Recorded at the Lambs Theater in New York City)

- Released: 2000
- Format: VHS

Live in the Throne Room (Recorded at the Cornerstone Church in Brentwood, TN)

- Released: 2004
- Format: DVD

=== Music videos ===
- 1996: "Count On Me" (Whitney Houston & Winans)
- 1998: "Well Alright"
- 1998: "The River"
- 2001: "More Than What I Wanted"
- 2017: "Dancing in the Spirit"
- 2018: "It's Christmas"
- 2020: "Never Lost"
- 2022: “Goodness of God”
- 2023: “Holy Forever”
- 2024: “Come Jesus Come”

=== Television appearances ===
This list does not include interviews or musical performances.

- 1994: Martin (episode: "Go Tell It on the Martin")
- 1997: Living Single (episode: "Oh, Solo Mio")
- 1997–99: CeCe's Place (on the Odyssey Channel)
- 2002: 7th Heaven (episode: "The Known Soldier")
- 2002: Doc (episode: "The Price of a Miracle")
- 2003–: Praise the Lord (occasional guest host)

Other

Journeys in Black: CeCe Winans (BET documentary of Cece Winans's life)

- Released: 2002
- Format: DVD

== Awards and nominations ==
As a solo artist and alongside BeBe Winans, CeCe Winans has received 18 Grammy Awards, 33 Dove Awards, and 23 Stellar Awards. Winans has also been honored with a star on the Hollywood Walk of Fame, the Nashville Music City Walk of Fame, and was one of the inaugural inductees into the Black Music & Entertainment Walk of Fame. She has been inducted into the GMA Dove Gospel Music Hall of Fame and has been honored with the Aretha Franklin Icon Award at the Stellar Awards.

== See also ==
- The Winans Family
- List of best-selling gospel music artists
