= Puresprings Gospel =

American gospel music record label

PureSprings Gospel
- Founded: 1999
- Founder: CeCe Winans
- Distributor: Sony Music Entertainment
- Genre: Worship, Christian, Gospel, Urban contemporary gospel
- Country of origin: United States
- Location: Brentwood, Tennessee
- Official website: www.purespringsgospel.com

PureSprings Gospel (formerly WellSpring Gospel) is a gospel music record label by gospel artist CeCe Winans. Winans founded the label in 1999 when Pioneer folded and released Alabaster Box as an experimental album and the album did well. Winans appointed Demetrius Stewart to oversee the label.

The label has signed several artists though Winans remains the flagship artist of the label. The label has also ventured into compilation CDs and children releases.

== Artists on the Label ==
- CeCe Winans
- Vicki Yohe
- Marcus Cole
- Marvin Winans
- Delores "Mom" Winans
- The Born Again Church Choir
- Alvin Love III

== Releases ==
=== Albums ===
Artist	Album	Release date	Distribution
CeCe Winans
CeCe Winans	WellSpring Gospel (1999-2003)		
CeCe Winans	Alabaster Box	October 19, 1999	Sparrow
CeCe Winans	CeCe Winans	June 19, 2001	Sparrow
CeCe Winans	PureSprings Gospel (2003–Present)		
CeCe Winans	Throne Room	September 9, 2003	Epic/INO/Sony
CeCe Winans	Purified	September 13, 2005	Epic/INO/Sony
CeCe Winans	Thy Kingdom Come	April 1, 2008	EMI Gospel
Vicki Yohe	I Just Want You	September 13, 2003	EMI Gospel
Vicki Yohe	He's Been Faithful	September 27, 2005	EMI Gospel
Born Again Church Choir	CeCe Winans Presents The Born Again Church Choir	2003	EMI Gospel
Marcus Cole	Write My Song	August 1, 2006	EMI Gospel
Marvin Winans	Alone But Not Alone	September 25, 2007	EMI Gospel
Various artists	PureWorship	October 28, 2008	EMI Gospel

=== Videos ===
- CeCe Winans: Live at the Lambs Theater in New York (2000)
- CeCe Winans: The Making of "Throne Room" (2003)
- CeCe Winans: Live in the Throne Room (2004)
