= List of awards and nominations received by CeCe Winans =

This is a comprehensive list of major music awards received by CeCe Winans, an American Gospel singer.

== Awards ==
=== American Music Awards ===
The American Music Awards are awarded annually. Winans has received 1 nomination.

Year	Category	Work	Result
2022	Favorite Gospel Artist	Herself	Nominated

=== BET Awards ===
The BET Awards are awarded annually by the Black Entertainment Television network. Winans has received 8 nominations.

Year	Category	Work	Result
2002	Best Gospel Artist	Herself	Nominated
2005	Best Gospel Artist	Herself	Nominated
2006	Best Gospel Artist	Herself	Nominated
2011	Best Gospel Artist	BeBe & CeCe Winans	Nominated
2017	Dr. Bobby Jones Best Gospel/Inspiration Award	"Never Have to Be Alone"	Nominated
2021	Dr. Bobby Jones Best Gospel/Inspiration Award	"Never Lost"	Nominated
2023	Dr. Bobby Jones Best Gospel/Inspiration Award	"I've Got Joy"	Nominated
2024	Dr. Bobby Jones Best Gospel/Inspiration Award	"Come Jesus Come"	Nominated
2026	Dr. Bobby Jones Best Gospel/Inspiration Award	"At the Cross"	Nominated

=== Billboard Music Awards ===
The Billboard Music Awards are awarded annually. Winans has received 3 wins from 8 nominations.

Year	Category	Work	Result
2022	Top Gospel Artist	Herself	Nominated
2022	Top Christian Album	Believe For It	Nominated
2022	Top Gospel Album	Believe For It	Nominated
2023	Top Gospel Song	"Goodness of God"	Won
2023	Top Gospel Artist	Herself	Nominated
2024	Top Gospel Artist	Herself	Won
2024	Top Gospel Album	More Than This	Nominated
2024	Top Gospel Song	"That's My King"	Won

=== BMI Trailblazers of Gospel Music Awards ===
The Trailblazers of Gospel Music Awards are awarded annually by BMI. Winans has been honored once and recognized twice.

Year	Category	Work	Result
2016	Trailblazers of Gospel Music Award Honoree	BeBe & CeCe Winans	Honored
2023	One of the Most-Performed Songs of the Year	"Believe for It"	Recognized
2023	Song of the Year	"Believe for It"	Won

=== GMA Dove Awards ===
The Dove Awards are awarded annually by the Gospel Music Association. Winans has received 1 honorary award and 35 competitive awards from 71 nominations.

Year	Category	Work	Result
1988	Horizon Award - New Artist of the Year	BeBe & CeCe Winans	Won
1988	Contemporary Album of the Year	BeBe & CeCe Winans	Nominated
1988	Song of the Year	"I.O.U. Me"	Nominated
1988	Female Vocalist of the Year	Herself	Nominated
1989	Female Vocalist of the Year	Herself	Nominated
1989	Artist of the Year	BeBe & CeCe Winans	Nominated
1989	Group of the Year	BeBe & CeCe Winans	Won
1990	Group of the Year	BeBe & CeCe Winans	Won
1990	Contemporary Black Gospel Recorded Song of the Year	"With My Whole Heart"	Won
1990	Contemporary Recorded Song of the Year	"Heaven"	Won
1990	Contemporary Album of the Year	Heaven	Won
1990	Female Vocalist of the Year	Herself	Nominated
1991	Group of the Year	BeBe & CeCe Winans	Nominated
1991	Contemporary Black Gospel Recorded Song of the Year	"Meantime"	Nominated
1992	Short Form Music Video of the Year	"Addictive Love"	Nominated
1992	Contemporary Black Gospel Recorded Song of the Year	"Addictive Love"	Won
1992	Contemporary Black Gospel Recorded Song of the Year	"I'll Take You There"	Nominated
1992	Rap/Hip Hop/Dance Recorded Song of the Year	"The Blood"	Nominated
1992	Contemporary Album of the Year	Different Lifestyles	Nominated
1992	Artist of the Year	Bebe & Cece Winans	Nominated
1992	Group of the Year	Bebe & Cece Winans	Won
1993	Group of the Year	Bebe & Cece Winans	Nominated
1995	Praise and Worship Album of the Year	Coram Deo II	Won
1996	Traditional Gospel Recorded Song of the Year	"Great is Thy Faithfulness"	Won
1996	Female Vocalist of the Year	Herself	Won
1996	Contemporary Gospel Album	Alone In His Presence	Nominated
1996	Contemporary Gospel Recorded Song	"Because of You"	Nominated
1997	Special Event Album of the Year	Tribute: The Songs of Andrae' Crouch	Won
1997	Contemporary Gospel Recorded Song of the Year	"Take Me Back"	Won
1997	Female Vocalist of the Year	Herself	Won
1997	Urban Recorded Song of the Year	"Feels Like Heaven (With You)"	Nominated
1998	Special Event Album of the Year	God With Us: A Celebration of Christmas Carols & Classics	Won
1998	Contemporary Gospel Recorded Song of the Year	"Up Where We Belong"	Won
1998	Female Vocalist of the Year	Herself	Nominated
1999	Contemporary Gospel Album	Everlasting Love	Nominated
2000	Contemporary Gospel Album	Alabaster Box	Nominated
2001	Contemporary Gospel Recorded Song of the Year	"Alabaster Box"	Won
2002	Contemporary Gospel Album of the Year	CeCe Winans	Won
2002	Contemporary Gospel Recorded Song of the Year	"Anybody Wanna Pray?"	Won
2002	Female Vocalist of the Year	Herself	Nominated
2003	Contemporary Gospel Recorded Song of the Year	"For Love Alone"	Nominated
2004	Contemporary Gospel Recorded Song of the Year	"Hallelujah Praise"	Won
2004	Traditional Gospel Album of the Year	CeCe Winans Presents: The Born Again Church Choir	Won
2004	Female Vocalist of the Year	Herself	Nominated
2004	Worship Song of the Year	"Throne Room"	Nominated
2004	Praise and Worship Album of the Year	Throne Room	Nominated
2006	Urban Recorded Song of the Year	"Pray"	Nominated
2009	Contemporary Gospel Recorded Song of the Year	"Waging War"	Nominated
2009	Contemporary Gospel Album of the Year	Thy Kingdom Come	Nominated
2010	Urban Recorded Song of the Year	"Close To You"	Won
2015	Gospel Music Hall of Fame	BeBe & CeCe Winans	Inducted
2017	Gospel Artist of the Year	Herself	Won
2017	Contemporary Gospel/Urban Album of the Year	Let Them Fall In Love	Won
2017	Contemporary Gospel/Urban Recorded Song of the Year	"Never Have To Be Alone"	Nominated
2018	Gospel Artist of the Year	Herself	Nominated
2019	Christmas / Special Event Album of the Year	Something's Happening!	Nominated
2021	Gospel Artist of the Year	Herself	Won
2021	Inspirational Recorded Song of the Year	"Great Is Thy Faithfulness"	Won
2021	Contemporary Gospel Recorded Song of the Year	"Never Lost"	Nominated
2021	Gospel Worship Album of the Year	Believe For It	Won
2021	Gospel Worship Recorded Song of the Year	"Believe For It"	Won
2022	Song of the Year	"Believe For It"	Won
2022	Inspirational Recorded Song of the Year	"I've Got Joy"	Nominated
2022	Contemporary Gospel Recorded Song of the Year	"Believe For It"	Nominated
2022	Gospel Worship Recorded Song of the Year	"Goodness of God - Live"	Nominated
2022	Artist of the Year	Herself	Won
2023	Artist of the Year	Herself	Nominated
2024	Artist of the Year	Herself	Won
2024	Inspiration Recorded Song of the Year	"My Tribute (To God Be the Glory)"	Won
2024	Inspiration Recorded Song of the Year	"Center of My Joy"	Nominated
2024	Gospel Worship Recorded Song of the Year	"That's My King"	Nominated
2024	Gospel Worship Album of the Year	More Than This	Won
2025	Artist of the Year	Herself	Nominated
2025	Song of the Year	"That's My King"	Nominated
2025	Christmas Recorded Song of the Year	"Joy To The World"	Won
2025	Gospel Recorded Song of the Year	"Come Jesus Come" (with Shirley Caesar)	Won
2026	Artist of the Year	Herself	Nominated
2026	Traditional Gospel Recorded Song of the Year	"At the Cross"	Nominated
2026	Gospel Worship Recorded Song of the Year	"More Than This"	Won
2026	Worship Recorded Song of the Year	"Worthy of It All (Worthy)"	Nominated
2026	Christmas Recorded Song of the Year	"The First Noel"	Nominated
2026	Gospel Worship Album of the Year	More Than This	Nominated
2026	Short Form Music Video of the Year (Performance)	"Worthy of It All (Worthy)"	Nominated

=== Grammy Awards ===
The Grammy Awards are awarded annually by the National Academy of Recording Arts and Sciences. Winans has won 18 awards from 38 nominations.

Year	Category	Work	Result
1985	Best Soul Gospel Performance by a Duo or Group, Choir or Chorus	Lord Lift Us Up	Nominated
1987	Best Soul Gospel Performance by a Duo or Group, Choir or Chorus	"Our Blessed Savior Has Come"	Nominated
1988	Best Soul Gospel Performance, Female	"For Always"	Won
1988	Best Soul Gospel Performance by a Duo or Group, Choir or Chorus	"Bebe & Cece Winans"	Nominated
1989	Best Soul Gospel Performance, Female	"I Have A Father"	Nominated
1989	Best Soul Gospel Performance by a Duo or Group, Choir or Chorus	"Silent Night, Holy Night"	Nominated
1990	Best Gospel Vocal Performance, Female	"Don't Cry"	Won
1990	Best Soul Gospel Performance by a Duo or Group, Choir or Chorus	"Heaven"	Nominated
1990	Best R&B Performance by a Duo or Group With Vocal	"Celebrate New Life"	Nominated
1992	Best Contemporary Soul Gospel Album	Different Lifestyles	Won
1995	Best Pop/Contemporary Gospel Album	First Christmas	Nominated
1995	Best R&B Performance by a Duo or Group with Vocal	"If Anything Ever Happened To You"	Nominated
1996	Best Contemporary Soul Gospel Album	Alone In His Presence	Won
1997	Best Pop Collaboration With Vocals	“Count On Me”	Nominated
1999	Best Contemporary Soul Gospel Album	Everlasting Love	Nominated
2000	Best Contemporary Soul Gospel Album	His Gift	Nominated
2001	Best Contemporary Soul Gospel Album	Alabaster Box	Nominated
2002	Best Pop/Contemporary Gospel Album	CeCe Winans	Won
2006	Best Contemporary Soul Gospel Album	Purified	Won
2006	Best Gospel Performance	"Pray"	Won
2008	Best Gospel Performance	"He Set My Life to Music"	Nominated
2009	Best Pop/Contemporary Gospel Album	Thy Kingdom Come	Won
2009	Best Gospel Performance	Waging War	Nominated
2011	Best Contemporary Soul Gospel Album	Still	Won
2011	Best Gospel Performance	Grace	Won
2018	Best Gospel Performance/Song	"Never Have to be Alone"	Won
2018	Best Gospel Album	Let Them Fall In Love	Won
2020	Best Gospel Album	Something's Happening! A Christmas Album	Nominated
2022	Best Gospel Performance/Song	"Never Lost"	Won
2022	Best Contemporary Christian Music Performance/Song	"Believe For It"	Won
2022	Best Gospel Album	Believe For It	Won
2025	Best Contemporary Christian Music Performance/Song	"Holy Forever (Live)"	Nominated
2025	Best Contemporary Christian Music Performance/Song	"That's My King"	Won
2025	Best Gospel Album	More Than This	Won
2026	Best Gospel Performance/Song	"Come Jesus Come" (with Shirley Caesar)	Won

=== NAACP Image Awards ===
The NAACP Image Awards are awarded annually by the National Association for the Advancement of Colored People (NAACP). Winans has won 5 awards from 17 nominations.

Year	Category	Work	Result
1987	Outstanding Gospel Artist	BeBe & CeCe Winans	Nominated
1989	Outstanding Gospel Artist	BeBe & CeCe Winans	Won
1990	Outstanding Gospel Artist	BeBe & CeCe Winans	Won
1992	Outstanding Gospel Artist	BeBe & CeCe Winans	Won
1993	Outstanding Gospel Artist	BeBe & CeCe Winans	Won
1996	Outstanding Performance in a Variety Series/Special	VH1 Honors	Nominated
1996	Outstanding Gospel Artist	Herself	Nominated
1996	Outstanding Gospel Artist	BeBe & CeCe Winans	Nominated
1997	Outstanding Gospel Artist	BeBe & CeCe Winans	Nominated
1997	Outstanding Duo or Group	BeBe & CeCe Winans	Nominated
1999	Outstanding Gospel Artist	Herself	Nominated
2006	Outstanding Gospel Artist	Herself	Nominated
2010	Best Gospel Album	Still	Won
2018	Outstanding Gospel/Christian Album (Traditional or Contemporary)	Let Them Fall In Love	Nominated
2021	Outstanding Gospel/Christian Song	"Never Lost"	Nominated
2022	Outstanding Gospel/Christian Song	"Believe For It"	Nominated
2022	Outstanding Gospel/Christian Album	Believe For It	Nominated

=== Soul Train Awards ===
The Soul Train Music Awards are awarded annually. Winans has won 4 awards from 12 nominations.

Year	Category	Work	Result
Soul Train Awards
1989	Best R&B/Urban Contemporary New Artist	BeBe & CeCe Winans	Nominated
1990	Best Gospel Album	Heaven	Won
1992	Best Gospel Album	Different Lifestyles	Won
1992	Best R&B/Soul Album - Group, Band, Duo	Different Lifestyles	Nominated
1992	R&B/Soul Song of the Year	"Addictive Love"	Nominated
1995	Best Gospel Album	Relationships	Nominated
2006	Best Gospel Album	Purified	Nominated
2009	Best Gospel Performance - Male, Female or Group	Close to You	Nominated
Soul Train Lady of Soul Awards
1996	Best Gospel Album	Alone In His Presence	Nominated
1999	Best Gospel Album	His Gift	Won
2000	Best Gospel Album	Alabaster Box	Nominated
2002	Best Gospel Album	CeCe Winans	Won

=== Stellar Awards ===
The Stellar Awards are awarded annually by SAGMA. Winans has received 2 honorary awards and 23 competitive awards from 58 nominations.

Year	Category	Work	Result
1988	Best New Gospel Artist	Bebe & CeCe Winans	Won
1990	Best Inspirational Gospel Performance	Bebe & CeCe Winans	Won
1990	Best Performance by Duo or Group	Bebe & CeCe Winans	Won
1990	Urban/Inspiration Single or the Performance of the Year	"Celebrate New Life"	Won
1990	Contemporary Song of the year	Heaven	Won
1990	Contemporary Album of the Year	Heaven	Won
1992	Best Gospel Album	Different Lifestyles	Won
2002	Artist of the Year	Herself	Nominated
2002	Female Vocalist of the Year	Herself	Nominated
2002	CD of the Year	Cece Winans	Nominated
2002	Contemporary CD of the Year	Cece Winans	Nominated
2002	Urban/Inspirational Performance of the Year	Cece Winans	Nominated
2005	Female Vocalist of the Year	Herself	Won
2005	Contemporary Female Vocalist of the Year	Herself	Won
2005	Song of the Year	"Hallelujah Praise"	Nominated
2005	CD of the Year	Throne Room	Nominated
2005	Contemporary CD of the Year	Throne Room	Nominated
2007	Contemporary Female Vocalist of the Year	Herself	Won
2007	Female Vocalist of the Year	Herself	Nominated
2007	Music Video of the Year	"Purified"	Nominated
2007	Song of the Year	"Pray"	Nominated
2007	Urban/Inspirational Single / Performance of the Year	"He's Concerned"	Nominated
2008	Stellar Honoree – The Chevrolet Most Notable Achievement Award	Herself	Honored
2009	Contemporary Female Artist of the Year	Herself	Won
2009	Female Vocalist of the Year	Herself	Nominated
2009	Urban/Inspirational Single / Performance of the Year	"Waging War"	Nominated
2009	Praise and Worship CD of the Year	Thy Kingdom Come	Nominated
2011	Artist of the Year	BeBe & CeCe Winans	Nominated
2011	Group Duo of the Year	BeBe & CeCe Winans	Nominated
2011	Contemporary Group/Duo of the Year	BeBe & CeCe Winans	Nominated
2011	Contemporary Female Vocalist of the Year	Herself	Won
2011	Female Vocalist of the Year	Herself	Nominated
2011	Contemporary CD of the Year	Still	Nominated
2011	Special Event CD of the Year	Still	Nominated
2011	Urban/Inspirational Single / Performance of the Year	"Still"	Won
2011	Song of the Year	"Close to You"	Won
2011	Music Video of the Year	"Close to You"	Won
2021	Contemporary Female Artist of the Year	Herself	Won
2021	Albertina Walker Female Artist of the Year	Herself	Won
2022	Song of the Year	"Believe For It"	Nominated
2022	Urban/Inspirational Single or Performance of the Year	"Believe For It"	Nominated
2022	Praise and Worship Song of the Year	"Believe For It"	Won
2022	Artist of the Year	Believe For It	Nominated
2022	Albertina Walker Female Artist of the Year	Believe For It	Nominated
2022	Contemporary Female Artist of the Year	Believe For It	Nominated
2022	Album of the Year	Believe For It	Nominated
2022	Praise and Worship Album of the Year	Believe For It	Won
2022	Producer of the Year	Herself	Won
2023	Aretha Franklin Icon Award	Herself	Honored
2023	Albertina Walker Female Artist of the Year	Believe For It	Nominated
2023	Contemporary Female Artist of the Year	Believe For It	Nominated
2024	Praise and Worship Song of the Year	"Holy Forever"	Nominated
2025	Albertina Walker Female Artist of the Year	More Than This	Won
2025	Contemporary Female Artist of the Year	More Than This	Won
2025	Artist of the Year	More Than This	Nominated
2025	Album of the Year	More Than This	Nominated
2025	Special Event Album of the Year	Joyful, Joyful: A Christmas Album	Nominated
2025	Praise and Worship Song of the Year	"More Than This"	Won
2025	Praise and Worship Song of the Year	"That's My King"	Nominated
2025	Song of the Year	"That's My King"	Nominated
2026	Duo/Chorus Group of the Year	"Come Jesus Come" (with Pastor Shirley Caesar)	Nominated

=== Miscellaneous awards and honors ===
Year	Award	Category	Work	Result
2004	Michigan's International Gospel Music Hall of Fame		Herself	Inducted
2004	Detroit Music Awards	Outstanding Gospel/Christian Artist/Group	Herself	Won
2007	Detroit Music Awards	Outstanding Gospel/Christian Artist/Group	Herself	Won
2007	Trumpet Awards	Lifetime Achievement Award	Herself	Honored
2009	BMI Awards	Trailblazer of Gospel Music	Herself	Honored
2009	Nashville Music City Walk of Fame		Herself	Inducted
2011	Essence Awards	Essence Honoree Award - Contribution to Gospel Music	Herself	Honored
2011	Hollywood Walk of Fame		BeBe & CeCe Winans	Inducted
2011	Trumpet Awards	Spirit Enlightenment Award	BeBe & CeCe Winans	Honored
2012	Belmont University School of Music	Applause Award - Contribution to the arts community in Nashville	Herself	Honored
2012	Cool Girls	Cool Woman of the Year Award	Herself	Won
2015	My Music Matters: A Celebration of Legends	Rhapsody & Rhythm Award	Herself	Won
2022	Black Music & Entertainment Walk of Fame		BeBe & CeCe Winans	Inducted
2023	ABGMA	Inspirational Song of the Year	"Goodness of God"	Won
