= 1992 Soul Train Music Awards =

Music awards ceremony in Los Angeles, US

Soul Train Music Awards
- Date: March 10, 1992
- Location: Shrine Auditorium, Los Angeles, California
- Country: United States
- Hosted by: Luther Vandross, Patti LaBelle, Will Smith and Vanessa Williams
- First award: 1987

Highlights
- Most awards: Natalie Cole and Color Me Badd (2)
- Website: soultrain.com

Television/radio coverage
- Network: WGN America

The 1992 Soul Train Music Awards was held at the Shrine Auditorium in Los Angeles, California. The show aired live in select cities on March 10, 1992 (and was later syndicated in other areas), honoring the best in R&B, soul, rap, jazz, and gospel music from the previous year. The show was hosted by Patti LaBelle, Will Smith, Luther Vandross and Vanessa Williams.

== Special awards ==
=== Heritage Award for Career Achievement ===
- Prince

=== Sammy Davis Jr. Award for Entertainer of the Year ===
- Janet Jackson

== Winners and nominees ==
Winners are in bold text.

=== Best R&B/Soul Album – Male ===
- **Luther Vandross – Power of Love**
  - Lenny Kravitz – Mama Said
  - Tony Terry – Tony Terry
  - Keith Washington – Make Time for Love

=== Best R&B/Soul Album – Female ===
- **Natalie Cole – Unforgettable... with Love**
  - Mariah Carey – Emotions
  - Lisa Fischer – So Intense
  - Whitney Houston – I'm Your Baby Tonight

=== Best R&B/Soul Album – Group, Band or Duo ===
- **Jodeci – Forever My Lady**
  - Guy – The Future
  - Prince and the New Power Generation – Diamonds and Pearls
  - BeBe & CeCe Winans – Different Lifestyles

=== Best R&B/Soul Single – Male ===
- **Keith Washington – "Kissing You"**
  - Johnny Gill – "I’m Still Waiting"
  - Tony Terry – "With You"
  - Luther Vandross – "Power of Love/Love Power"

=== Best R&B/Soul Single – Female ===
- **Lisa Fischer – "How Can I Ease the Pain"**
  - Natalie Cole – "Unforgettable"
  - Whitney Houston – "All the Man That I Need"
  - Patti LaBelle – "Feels Like Another One"

=== Best R&B/Soul Single – Group, Band or Duo ===
- **Color Me Badd – "I Wanna Sex You Up"**
  - Boyz II Men – "It's So Hard to Say Goodbye to Yesterday"
  - Jodeci – "Forever My Lady"
  - Sounds of Blackness – "Optimistic"

=== R&B/Soul Song of the Year ===
- **Color Me Badd – "I Wanna Sex You Up"**
  - Boyz II Men – "It's So Hard to Say Goodbye to Yesterday"
  - Jodeci – "Forever My Lady"
  - BeBe & CeCe Winans – "Addictive Love"

=== Best Music Video ===
- **MC Hammer – "Too Legit to Quit"**
  - Boyz II Men – "It's So Hard to Say Goodbye to Yesterday"
  - Natalie Cole - "Unforgettable"
  - Michael Jackson – "Black Or White"

=== Best New R&B/Soul Artist ===
- **Boyz II Men**
  - Color Me Badd
  - Lisa Fischer
  - Jodeci

=== Best Rap Album ===
- **Public Enemy – Apocalypse '91**
  - Geto Boys – We Can't Be Stopped
  - Heavy D and the Boyz – Peaceful Journey
  - Naughty by Nature – Naughty by Nature

=== Best Gospel Album ===
- **BeBe & CeCe Winans – Different Lifestyles**
  - Reverend James Cleveland and the L.A. Gospel Messengers – Reverend James Cleveland and the L.A. Gospel Messengers
  - The Rance Allen Group – Phenomenon
  - Sounds of Blackness – Evolution of Gospel

=== Best Jazz Album ===
- **Natalie Cole – Unforgettable... with Love**
  - Harry Connick Jr. – Blue Light, Red Light
  - Alex Bugnon – 107 in the Shade
  - Fourplay – Fourplay

== Performers ==
- Heavy D & The Boyz – "Now That We Found Love"
- Naughty By Nature – "O.P.P."
- Patti LaBelle – "Somebody Loves You Baby (You Know Who It Is)"
- Public Enemy – "Everything's Gonna Be Alright"
- Boyz II Men (with Michael Bivins) – "Motownphilly"
- DJ Jazzy Jeff & The Fresh Prince – "Summertime"
- Jodeci – "Forever My Lady"
- Prince Tribute:
  - Stephanie Mills – "How Come U Don't Call Me Anymore?"
  - Rosie Gaines – "Nothing Compares 2 U"
  - Patti LaBelle – "Yo Mister"
- Color Me Badd – "I Wanna Sex You Up"
- Luther Vandross – "Don't Want to Be a Fool"
- Vanessa Williams – "The Comfort Zone"
- Bebe & Cece Winans – "It's OK"

== Presenters ==
- El DeBarge, Jody Watley, and Tommy Davidson - Presented Best R&B Soul New Artist
- Christopher Reid, Johnny Gill, and Shanice - Presented Best Gospel Album
- Marsha Warfield, Tony Terry, and Big Daddy Kane - Presented Best R&B Soul Single Female
- Montel Williams, Keith Sweat, and Downtown Julie Brown - Presented Best Jazz Album
- John Singleton - Presented Sammy Davis Jr. Award For Entertainer of the Year
- Sounds of Blackness, Cherrelle, and Tevin Campbell - Presented Best R&B Soul Music Video
- Sinbad, Rosie Perez, and Will Downing - Presented Best R&B Soul Single Group, Band, or Duo
- Gerald Albright, Karyn White, and Jimmy Jam and Terry Lewis - Presented Best Rap Album
- Troy Beyer - Presented Heritage Award For Career Achievement
- Atlantic Starr, Teddy Riley, and Karyn Parsons - Presented R&B Soul Single Male
- Babyface, Lupita Jones, and Hi-Five - Presented Best R&B Soul Song of the Year
- Harvey Mason, Salt-N-Pepa, and Aaron Hall - Presented Best R&B Soul Album Male
- Calloway, Keith Washington, and Chante Moore - Presented R&B Soul Album Group, Band, or Duo
- Alex Bugnon, Holly Robinson Peete and Another Bad Creation - Presented Best R&B Soul Album Female
