= First Christmas (album) =

Studio album by BeBe & CeCe Winans
- Released: October 25, 1993
- Length: 58:50
- Labels: Sparrow; Capitol

BeBe & CeCe Winans chronology
Different Lifestyles (1991)	First Christmas (1993)	Relationships (1994)

First Christmas is the fifth studio album by American brother and sister duo BeBe & CeCe Winans. It was released on October 25, 1993, through Sparrow Records and Capitol.

== Critical reception ==
Professional ratings
Review scores
Source	Rating
AllMusic	2.5/5 stars

AllMusic editor Marvin Jolly noted that "the Winans' remarkably soulful vocals electrify holiday classics like "Jingle Bells," "Joy to the World," "Silent Night" and "Hark, the Herald Angels Sing" on First Christmas, a seasonal collection ideal for fans of the contemporary gospel sound." He rated the album two and a half out of five stars.

== Track listing ==
First Christmas track listing
No.	Title	Writer(s)	Producer(s)	Length
1.	"Jingle Bells"	James Lord Pierpont	Steve Harvey	4:23
2.	"Silver Bells"	Jay Livingston; Ray Evans	BeBe Winans; Cedric Caldwell	4:22
3.	"Give Me a Star"	BeBe Winans	B. Winans; Caldwell	4:59
4.	"Joy to the World"	George Frideric Handel	Harvey	5:29
5.	"I Love You"	B. Winans; Angie Winans	B. Winans	4:43
6.	"Silent Night, Holy Night"	Franz Xaver Gruber; Joseph Mohr	B. Winans; Billy Smiley; Phil Naish	5:21
7.	"Hark the Herald Angels Sing"	Felix Mendelssohn; William H. Cummings	B. Winans; Caldwell	5:22
8.	"White Christmas"	Irving Berlin	B. Winans; Caldwell	4:58
9.	"Ooh Child"	Stan Vincent	B. Winans; Caldwell	5:11
10.	"For Unto Us (A Child Is Born)"	Handel	Greg Nelson	4:29
11.	"All Because"	C. Winans; Madeline Stone	B. Winans; Caldwell	4:07
12.	"The First Noel"	Traditional	David Foster	6:00
Total length:				58:50

== Personnel and credits ==
- David Anderson – acoustic guitar
- James Blair – drums, percussion
- Cedric Caldwell – keyboards
- Victor Caldwell – bass
- E.J. Camp – photography
- Curry Design, Inc. – design
- Dana Davis – drums
- Jim Ferguson – acoustic bass
- Marc Harris – keyboards
- Paul Jackson, Jr. – lead guitar
- Kelly E. O'Neal – saxophone
- Karen Philpott – director of photography
- Louis Upkins, Jr. – coordinato
- Benjamin Winans – executive producer

== Charts ==
Weekly chart performance
Chart (1983)	Peak position
US Billboard 200	163
US Top Gospel Albums (Billboard)	23
US Top R&B/Hip-Hop Albums (Billboard)	17
