= 21st GMA Dove Awards =

1990 US music awards ceremony

- Date: April 5, 1990
- Location: Tennessee Performing Arts Center, Nashville, Tennessee
- Hosted by: Clifton Davis and Sandi Patty

The 21st Annual GMA Dove Awards were held on April 5, 1990, recognizing accomplishments of musicians for the year 1989. The show was held at the Tennessee Performing Arts Center in Nashville, Tennessee, and was hosted by Clifton Davis and Sandi Patty.

== Award recipients ==
- Song of the Year
  - "Thank You"; Ray Boltz; Gaither Music, Shepherd Boy Music (ASCAP)
- Songwriter of the Year
  - Steven Curtis Chapman
- Male Vocalist of the Year
  - Steven Curtis Chapman
- Female Vocalist of the Year
  - Sandi Patty
- Group of the Year
  - Bebe & Cece Winans
- Artist of the Year
  - Steven Curtis Chapman
- New Artist of the Year
  - David Mullen
- Southern Gospel Album of the Year
  - I Just Started Living; The Cathedrals; Lari Goss; Homeland
- Southern Gospel Recorded Song of the Year
  - "I Can See The Hand Of God"; The Cathedrals; Steven Curtis Chapman, Jim Chapman III
- Inspirational Album of the Year
  - The Mission; Steve Green; Greg Nelson; Sparrow
- Inspirational Recorded Song of the Year
  - "His Strength Is Perfect"; Steven Curtis Chapman; Steven Curtis Chapman, Jerry Salley; Sparrow
- Pop/Contemporary Album of the Year
  - Heaven; BeBe and CeCe Winans; Keith Thomas; Sparrow
- Pop/Contemporary Recorded Song of the Year
  - "Heaven"; BeBe & CeCe Winans; Keith Thomas, Benjamin Winans; Sparrow
- Contemporary Gospel Album of the Year
  - Will You Be Ready; Commissioned; Fred Hammond, Michael Brooks; Light
- Contemporary Gospel Recorded Song of the Year
  - "With My Whole Heart"; BeBe & CeCe Winans; Patrick Henderson, Louis Brown III; Sparrow
- Traditional Gospel Album of the Year
  - Saints in Praise; West Angeles Church Of God In Christ Mass Choir; Patrick Henderson; Sparrow
- Traditional Gospel Recorded Song of the Year
  - "Wonderful"; Beau Williams; Virginia Davis, Theodore Fry
- Country Album of the Year
  - Heirloom; Heirloom; Michael Sykes, Trent Hemphill; Benson
- Country Recorded Song of the Year
  - "'Tis So Sweet to Trust in Jesus"; Amy Grant; Public Domain; Word
- Rock Album of the Year
  - The Way Home; Russ Taff; Russ Taff, James Hollihan; Myrrh
- Rock Recorded Song of the Year
  - "The River Unbroken"; Russ Taff; Darryl Brown, David Batteau; Myrrh
- Hard Music Album of the Year
  - Triumphant Return; Whitecross; Rex Carroll, Joey Powers; Pure Metal
- Hard Music Recorded Song of the Year
  - "In Your Face"; Shout; Ken Tamplin; Intense
- Instrumental Album of the Year
  - One of Several Possible Musiks; Kerry Livgren; Kerry Livgren; Sparrow
- Praise and Worship Album of the Year
  - Our Hymns; Various Artists; Various Producers; Word
- Children's Music Album of the Year
  - Sandi Patti and the Friendship Company; Sandi Patti; Greg Nelson, Sandi Patti; Word
- Musical Album
  - Friends Forever Part II; Billy Sprague; Jim Weber, Nan Gurley, Billy Sprague;
- Choral Collection Album
  - The Acapella Collection; Greg Nelson Singers; Greg Nelson; Wordsong
- Short Form Music Video of the Year
  - "I Miss The Way"; Michael W. Smith; Stephen Yake, producer and director; Reunion
- Long Form Music Video of the Year
  - On Fire; Petra; Stephen Yake, director; Star Song
- Recorded Music Packaging of the Year
  - Buddy Jackson, Mark Tucker; Petra Praise: The Rock Cries Out Petra
