= Relationships (album) =

Studio album by BeBe & CeCe Winans
- Released: 1994
- Studios: Quad, Nashville: The Hit Factory, New York; Record Plant, Los Angeles; Oakshire, Los Angeles; Scotland Yard, Los Angeles; Ameraycan, North Hollywood
- Labels: Sparrow; Capitol
- Producers: BeBe Winans; Arif Mardin; Joe Mardin; David Foster; Rhett Lawrence; Cedric Caldwell; Steve Harvey

BeBe & CeCe Winans chronology
First Christmas (1993)	Relationships (1994)	Greatest Hits (1996)

Professional ratings
Review scores
Source	Rating
AllMusic	3/5 stars

Relationships is the sixth studio album by American gospel/R&B brother and sister duo BeBe & CeCe Winans, released in 1994 by Sparrow and Capitol Records. Described in a review by AllMusic's Thom Granger as "heading toward more downtempo, ballad-heavy R&B" compared with their previous releases, producers on the album include BeBe Winans, Arif Mardin, David Foster and Rhett Lawrence, marking the first release by the duo without the production involvement of Keith Thomas, though he co-wrote two of the tracks. Relationships would be the last studio album by the duo until Still, released in 2009.

The album was nominated for Best Gospel Album at the 1995 Soul Train Music Awards, with Africa to America: The Journey of the Drum by Sounds of Blackness winning the award.

== Track listing ==
No.	Title	Writer(s)	Length
1.	"Intro – Count It All Joy"	BeBe Winans; Jud Friedman; Allan Rich	6:31
2.	"Love of My Life"	B. Winans; Keith Thomas	4:54
3.	"Don't Let Me Walk This Road Alone"	David Foster; Linda Foster; Thomas	4:17
4.	"Both Night & Day"	B. Winans; Rhett Lawrence	4:24
5.	"Stay with Me"	B. Winans; Steve Harvey	4:51
6.	"He's Always There"	CeCe Winans; Madeline Stone	3:50
7.	"Right Away"	B. Winans; Harvey	4:53
8.	"If Anything Ever Happened to You"	Friedman; Rich	4:18
9.	"These What Abouts"	B. Winans	5:00
10.	"(If I Was Only) Welcomed In"	B. Winans; Lawrence	5:14
11.	"We Can Make a Difference"	C. Winans; Stone

== Personnel ==
Adapted from the album's liner notes.

=== Musicians ===
- BeBe Winans – lead vocals (tracks 1–5, 7–11), backing vocals (tracks 1, 2, 5–8, 10), arrangement (tracks 4, 5, 7, 9), vocal arrangement (tracks 4, 10), backing vocal arrangement (tracks 1, 2, 6, 8), choir arrangement (track 11)
- CeCe Winans – lead vocals (tracks 1–8, 10, 11), backing vocals (tracks 2, 7, 8), kids choir arrangement (track 11)
- Maxi Anderson – backing vocals (track 4)
- Margaret Bell – backing vocals (track 6), choir (track 11)
- Gary Bias – flutes
- J. D. Blair – drums (tracks 6, 11)
- Ray Brown – horn arrangement (track 5), trumpet (track 5), flugelhorn (track 5)
- Sharon Caldwell – choir (track 11)
- John Campbell – choir (track 11)
- Mike "Dino" Campbell – guitar (track 2)
- Cod "C" – keyboards (tracks 1, 6, 11), arranger (tracks 1, 6, 11), intro arrangement, keyboards & sound effects (track 1)
- Clyde Duffie – choir (track 11)
- Kendall Duffie – choir (track 11)
- Michelle Duffie – choir (track 11)
- David Foster – keyboards (tracks 3, 9), arrangement (tracks 3, 9)
- Jud Friedman – additional keyboards (track 8), additional arrangement (track 8)
- Gary Grant – trumpet (track 7)
- Claude Gaudette – synthesizer programming (tracks 3, 9)
- Marc Harris – acoustic piano (track 11)
- Steve Harvey – all other instruments (tracks 5, 7), arrangement (tracks 5, 7), horn arrangement (tracks 5, 7)
- Jerry Hey – trumpet (track 7), horn arrangement (track 7)
- Paul Jackson Jr. – guitar (tracks 1, 6, 10, 11)
- The Katinas – backing vocals (track 1)
- Sam Katina – choir (track 11)
- Abe Laboriel – bass guitar (track 10)
- Rhett Lawrence – keyboards (tracks 4, 10), drum programming (tracks 4, 10), arrangement (track 4)
- Jeremy Lubbock – strings arrangement (tracks 3, 9)
- Charity McCrory – backing vocals (track 4)
- Darius McCrory – backing vocals (track 10)
- Linda McCrory – backing vocals (track 4)
- Donna McElroy – backing vocals (track 6), choir (track 11)
- Joe Mardin – keyboards (track 2), drum loops (track 8), arrangement (track 2)
- Bill Myers – additional synthsizer arrangement (track 10)
- Nashville String Machine – strings; arranged by Ronn Huff (tracks 6, 11)
- William Raichenback – trombone (track 7)
- John Robinson – drums (tracks 3, 9)
- Steve Skinner – keyboards (track 8), arrangement (track 8)
- Tony Smith – keyboards (track 10), drum programming (track 10)
- Andy Snitzer – alto saxophone (track 2)
- Chris Standring – acoustic guitar (track 5)
- Duane Starling – choir (track 11)
- Keith Thomas – arrangement (track 2)
- Michael Thompson – guitars (tracks 3, 9)
- Vic "C" – bass guitar (tracks 1, 6, 11), drum programming (track 1)
- Kirk Whalum – tenor saxophone (track 6)
- Daniel Wilensky – alto saxophone (track 8)
- Dave Williams – guitars (track 4)
- Larry Williams – tenor saxophone (track 7)
- Angie Winans – backing vocals (tracks 6, 10), choir (track 11)
- Daniel Winans – choir (track 11)
- Debbie Winans – backing vocals (track 10)
- Ronald Winans – backing vocals (track 10)
- Mona Lisa Young – backing vocals (track 4)

=== Technical ===
- BeBe Winans – producer (tracks 1, 4, 5, 6, 7, 11), executive producer
- Cedric Caldwell – producer (tracks 1, 6, 11)
- Arif Mardin – producer (tracks 2, 8), mixing (tracks 2, 8)
- Joe Mardin – producer (track 2), mixing (track 2), programming (track 2)
- David Foster – producer (tracks 3, 9)
- Rhett Lawrence – producer (tracks 4, 10)
- Steve Harvey – producer (tracks 5, 7), mixing (track 7)
- Dave Beitas – engineer (track 3)
- Scott Blockland – mixing assistant
- Felipe Elgueta – additional engineer (track 9)
- Humberto Gatica – mixing (track 10)
- Carl Glanville – assistant engineer (track 2)
- Andrew Grassi – assistant engineer (track 8)
- Mick Guzauski – mixing (tracks 3, 9)
- Robert Hoffman – assistant engineer (track 2)
- Ted Jensen – mastering (all tracks)
- Bill Leonard – assistant engineer (tracks 3, 9)
- Mike McCarthy – engineer (tracks 1, 6, 11)
- Richard McIntosh – engineer (tracks 5, 7), mixing (track 7)
- Steve MacMillan – engineer (track 4)
- Mike More – additional programming (track 4)
- Michael O'Reilly – recording (tracks 2, 8), mixing (tracks 2, 8)
- Dave Reitas – engineer (track 9)
- Marnie Riley – assistant mixing (tracks 3, 9)
- Thom Russo – engineer (tracks 4, 10), assistant engineer (track 5), mixing (track 4)
- Jack Joseph Puig – additional recording (track 2)
- Steve Skinner – programming (track 8)
- Andrew Smith – assistant engineer (track 2)
- John Thomas – mixing assistant (tracks 6, 11)
- Vic "C" – engineer (tracks 1, 6, 11), mixing (tracks 6, 11)
- Dave Way – mixing (tracks 1, 4, 5)
- Barbara Slane – project coordinator
- BRD Design – album design
- Tommy Steele – art direction
- Carol Friedman – photography
- Ruth Carson – creative consultant
- Tara Posey – makeup
- Michael Weeks – hair stylist
- Roni Burks – wardrobe

Studios

- Track 1 recorded at Quad Studios, Nashville, Tennessee; mixed at Larrabee West Studio, North Hollywood, California
- Track 2 recorded & mixed at The Hit Factory, New York; additional recording at Conway Studios, Los Angeles, California
- Track 3 recorded at Record Plant, Los Angeles, California; mixed at Conway Studios, Los Angeles, California
- Track 4 recorded & mixed at Oakshire Recorders, Los Angeles, California
- Track 5 recorded at Scotland Yard Studios, Los Angeles, California & Ameraycan Studios, North Hollywood, California; mixed at Larrabee North Studio
- Track 6 recorded at Quad Studios, Nashville, Tennessee; mixed at Soundstage, Nashville, Tennessee
- Track 7 recorded & mixed at Scotland Yard Studios, Los Angeles, California & Ameraycan Studios, North Hollywood, California
- Track 8 recorded & mixed at The Hit Factory, New York
- Track 9 recorded at Record Plant, Los Angeles, California; mixed at Conway Studios
- Track 10 recorded & mixed at Oakshire Recorders
- Track 11 recorded at Quad Studios, Nashville, Tennessee; mixed at Soundstage, Nashville, Tennessee

== Charts ==
Chart performance for Relationships
Chart (1994)	Peak position
US Billboard 200	111
US Top Gospel Albums (Billboard)	4
US Top R&B/Hip-Hop Albums (Billboard)	19
