= Heart of a Man =

Studio album by Tony Terry
- Released: October 4, 1994
- Genre: R&B; soul
- Length: 50:30
- Label: Virgin

Tony Terry chronology
Tony Terry (1990)	Heart of a Man (1994)	Changed! (2006)

Heart of a Man is an album by the American R&B singer Tony Terry, released in 1994. It charted in the top 50 on Billboard's Top R&B Albums chart.

== Critical reception ==
Professional ratings
Review scores
Source	Rating
The Tampa Tribune	3/4 stars
USA Today	3/4 stars

USA Today wrote that Terry's "urgent, gut-wrenching voice, spanning tenor to falsetto, soars on meaty material." The Tampa Tribune thought that "this pretty-boy crooner sticks with his strengths, which include showcasing some emotional weaknesses."

== Track listing ==
1. "When a Man Cries" – 4:03
2. "When Will I See You Again" – 5:23
3. "Save Your Love" – 5:05
4. "I Love You More Than You'll Ever Know" – 6:07
5. "Heart of a Man" – 4:37
6. "Don't Give Up a Good Man" – 3:54
7. "Surrender" – 5:06
8. "Can't Let Go" – 4:54
9. "My Prayer" – 5:20
10. "I'm Sorry" – 6:01
