= BeBe Winans =

American gospel and R&B singer (born 1962)

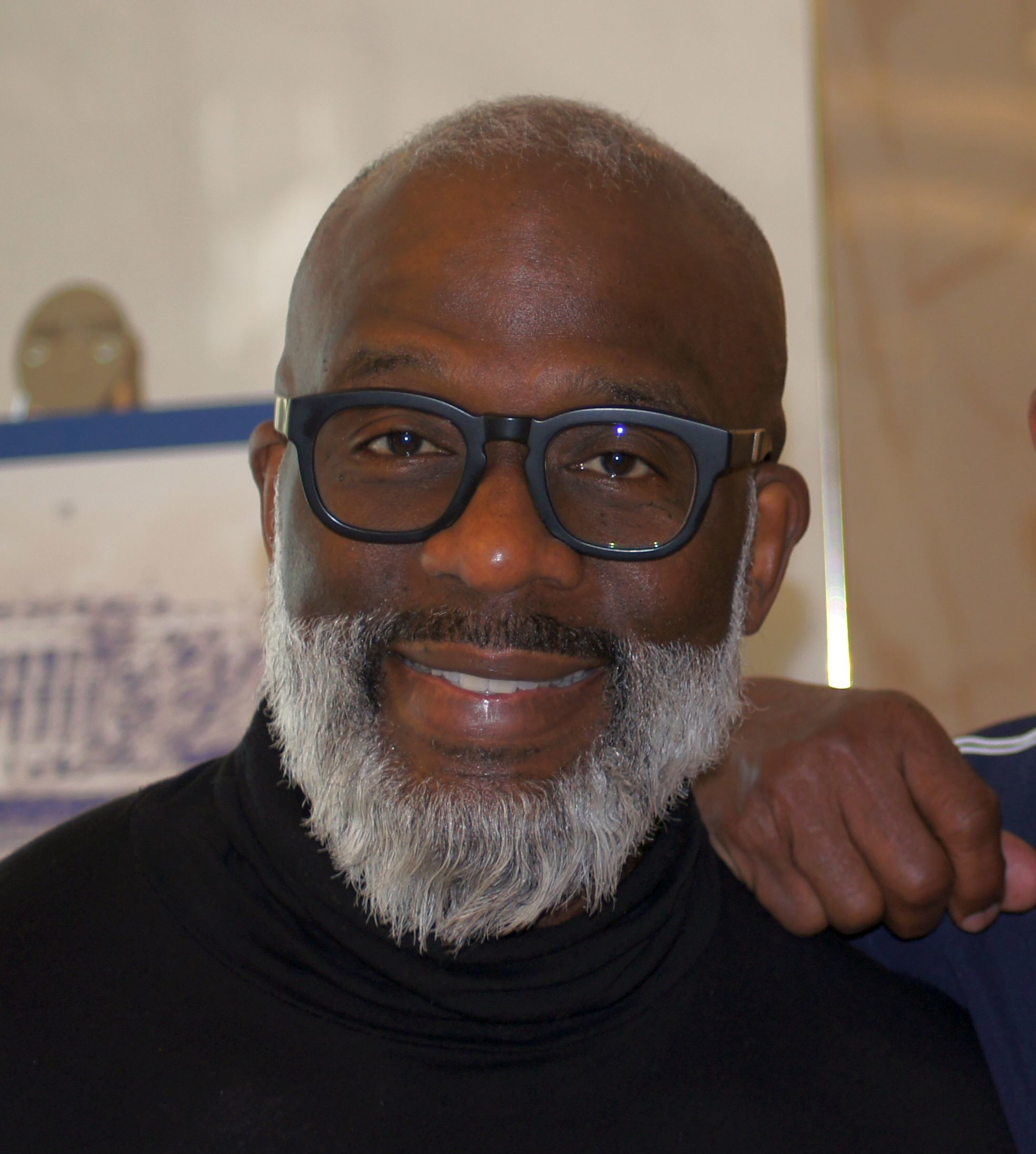
- Winans at the White House Correspondents' Dinner in 2019

Background information
- Born: Benjamin Glenn; September 17, 1962 (age 64); Detroit, Michigan, U.S.
- Genres: Gospel; R&B
- Occupations: Singer, songwriter, producer
- Years active: 1984–present
- Labels: PTL (1984–87), Sparrow / Capitol (1987–98); Atlantic (1997–98); Motown (1999–2003); Still Waters / Hidden Beach (2004–06); The Movement Group (2004–present)
- Formerly of: Winans family; BeBe & CeCe Winans
- Website: www.bmg.com/de/artist/bebe-winans

Benjamin "BeBe" Winans (born September 17, 1962) is an American gospel and R&B singer from Detroit, Michigan. He is a member of the noted Winans family, most members of which are also gospel artists. Winans has released nine solo albums, seven with his sister CeCe as BeBe & CeCe Winans, and one with three Winans brothers.

== The PTL Club ==
Winans released several albums, first with his sister CeCe, and later as a solo artist. Jim Bakker's television show The PTL Club took interest in BeBe and his sister CeCe as background vocalists for the show. After going to South Carolina to audition they were accepted. The siblings moved to the PTL campus in South Carolina, and were on the show for about five years.

During their time on PTL, BeBe and CeCe recorded Lord Lift Us Up on PTL's label after popular demand on the show. Eventually the success warranted another effort: a full-length album. The album did well on the charts. BeBe and CeCe left PTL to pursue their singing career and recorded five albums together including self-titled BeBe & CeCe Winans, Heaven, Different Lifestyles, First Christmas and Relationships. In 1995, BeBe and CeCe split up to pursue solo careers. But in 2009, they did the album Still together. On it was the song "Close to You," which won a Dove Award in 2010 in the category of Urban Recorded Song.

== Solo career ==
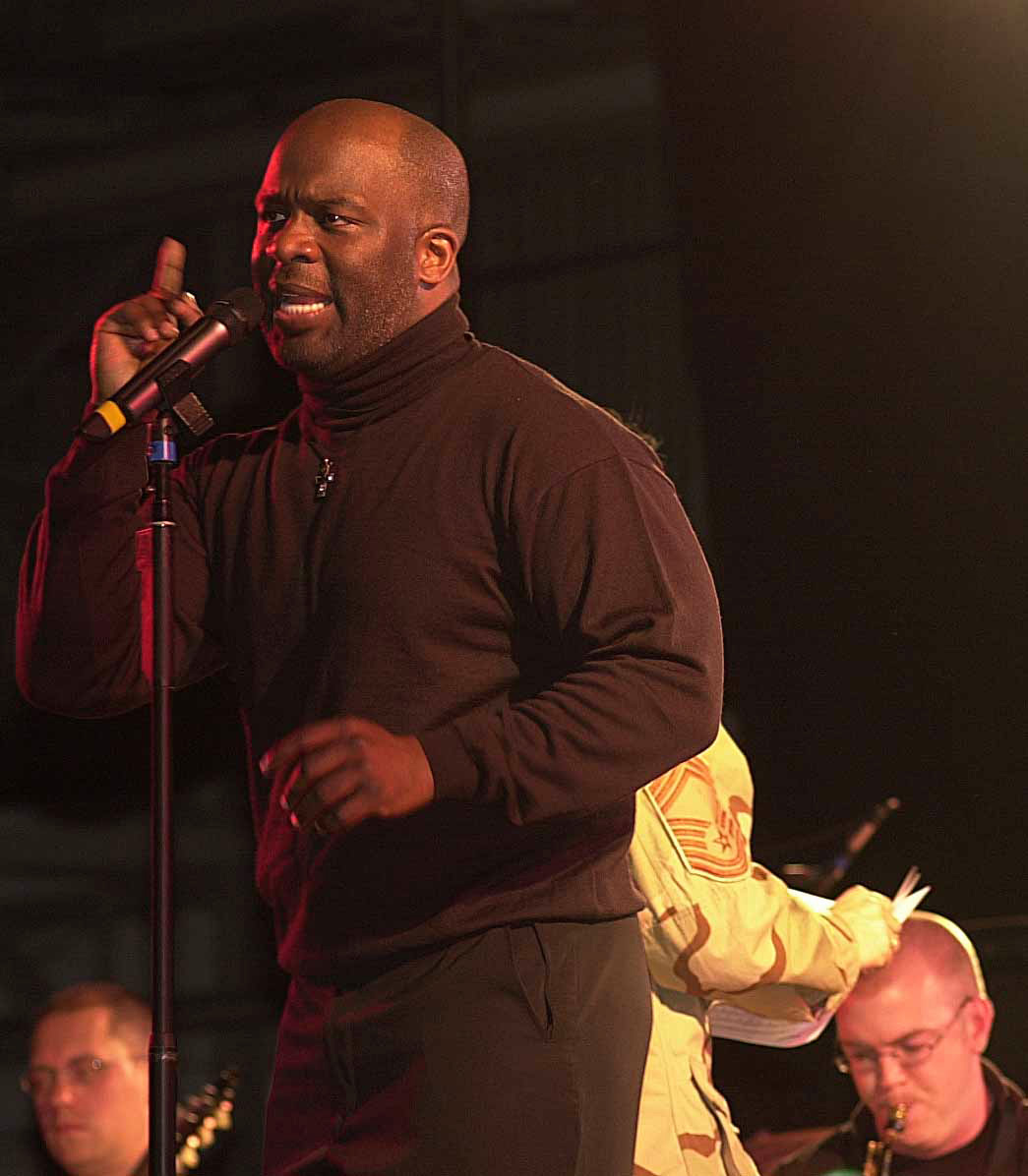
Winans performing in 2002

In 1989, BeBe won his first Grammy for Best Soul Gospel Performance, Male for his contribution to "Abundant Life", a track on his brother Ronald's Family & Friends Choir.

BeBe signed with Atlantic records in late 1996 and delivered a self-titled solo debut in 1997. The album featured the singles "In Harms' Way", "Thank You", and the international crossover hit "I Wanna Be the Only One" featuring British soul trio Eternal. The song topped the UK Singles Chart in Eternal's native United Kingdom in May 1997.

The next album released was the fruit of a new deal with Motown Records. Love & Freedom was released in 2000 and featured production from Warryn Campbell, Brian McKnight, Masters At Work and others. The lead single "Coming Back Home" was a slow swinging ballad featuring R&B luminaries McKnight and Joe. Another single was BeBe's remake of the Stevie Wonder classic "Jesus Children of America" featuring his older brother Marvin (The Winans, Winans family) and Stevie Wonder himself.

Two years later, a live album Live & Up Close followed. The album was recorded live at BET studios and featured guests such as his sister Debra Winans-Lowe and Stephanie Mills. The set was released on both CD & DVD. The CD included the studio version of "Do You Know Him?" which served as the album's first single.

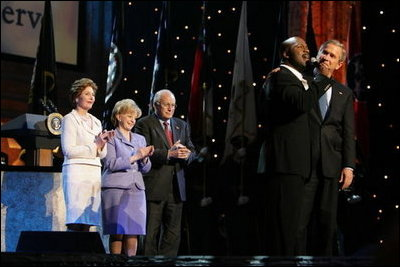
President George W. Bush with his arm around Winans as he sings "God Bless America" during the "Saluting Those Who Serve" event on January 18, 2005. Also pictured are, from left, Laura Bush, Lynne Cheney, and Vice President Dick Cheney.

By 2003, BeBe had started his own record label, The Movement Group, and partnered with Still Waters, an inspirational and gospel imprint of Hidden Beach Recordings. The first album under this deal was 2004's largely orchestral holiday album entitled My Christmas Prayer which first appeared exclusively for sale at Starbucks coffee shops nationwide. Between releases, BeBe made his film debut with a small role in the 2004 remake (featuring Denzel Washington) of The Manchurian Candidate.

Early the next year, BeBe released his third proper solo album Dream featuring the single "I Have A Dream". The song featured samples of the historic speech by Martin Luther King, and was released to several radio stations to coincide with King's birthday celebrations. The cover of the album features a hand painted portrait of BeBe standing in front of a Martin Luther King Jr Blvd. street sign. Also "Miracle Of Love," a duet with Angie Stone included on the album, also appeared on a soundtrack of songs inspired by the film The Passion Of The Christ.

On September 30, 2003, at Hollywood's Kodak Theater, BeBe performed two songs with Anastacia; a duet for her song "Heavy on my Heart" and backup vocals for a cover version of the Aerosmith song "I Don't Wanna Miss a Thing". The performance was for the fourth annual "Women Rock" benefit for breast cancer, which was broadcast on October 23, 2003, on the Lifetime cable channel.

Winans performed a duet with Eden Espinosa on the 2008 Alma Awards which was broadcast on ABC on September 12. 2008. Winans and Espinosa sang "I Don't Know Much" as a tribute to honoree Linda Ronstadt. BeBe performed "Born for This" on the Obama/Biden Inauguration tribute Change is Now CD+DVD set. BeBe & CeCe Winans had confirmed a reunion album scheduled for early 2009.

Winans hosts his own nationally syndicated radio program, The BeBe Winans Radio Show. BeBe Winans has starred in Broadway's The Color Purple as Harpo as of January 9, 2008. He is starring alongside Chaka Khan who is playing his wife, Sofia.

Since 2010, Winans has been the host of Sunday morning radio show The BeBe Experience for SiriusXM's Heart & Soul airs every Sunday Morning

Winans was one of the judges for a gospel music competition show on BET called Sunday Best, along with gospel duo Mary Mary. He was invited to participate in the remake of "We Are The World" to benefit Haiti after the 2010 earthquake. BeBe together with Cece and Mary Mary featuring the West Angeles Choir performed on The Tonight Show with Jay Leno.

In 2012, Winans released The Whitney I Knew, a memoir about Whitney Houston, who had died earlier that year. Winans was a close friend of the singer, and sang at her funeral.

In March 2014, Winans joined British pop/R&B group Eternal at the Hammersmith Apollo in London, to perform the number one hit "I Wanna Be the Only One", as part of The Big Reunion live shows.

In March 2025, Winans achieved his third number-one on Billboards's Gospel Airplay chart (fourth if including CeCe) with "Father In Heaven (Right Now)" (featuring Gerald Albright), following "In Jesus Name" in 2021 and "He Promised Me" in 2018. BeBe, with CeCe, also had a number-one hit on the Gospel Airplay chart with "Close to You" in 2009.

== Legal issues ==
In November 2007, Winans filed suit in Davidson County, Tennessee against Eric Peterson, who had managed him between 2002 and 2007. Winans's claims included breach of a managerial contract and of fiduciary duties, as well as fraud. Winans asserted that Peterson stole from him and took advantage of his trust, stating that in February 2002, "Mr. Peterson induced Mr. Winans to execute a power of attorney, representing that it was required to permit Mr. Peterson to perform his services. In fact, on December 31, 2004, Mr. Peterson used the power of attorney to execute a promissory note purporting to obligate Mr. Winans to pay Mr. Peterson himself the sum of $150,000."

Winans was arrested March 11, 2009, on charges of domestic assault for allegedly pushing his ex-wife to the ground in front of their children during an argument. According to a court filing, Winans and his former spouse got into a "verbal altercation" on February 13 about "custody issues dealing with their children." On December 4, 2009, the domestic assault criminal charges against Winans were dismissed. An AP news report indicates the court action resulted from a pre-trial diversion deal offered by the prosecution, calling for Winans to attend domestic violence counseling in exchange for dismissal of the charges.

== Discography ==
=== Solo albums ===
- 1997: BeBe Winans (Atlantic)
- 2000: Love & Freedom (Motown)
- 2002: Live and Up Close (Motown)
- 2004: My Christmas Prayer (The Movement Group / Hidden Beach / Epic)
- 2005: Dream (The Movement Group / Still Waters / Hidden Beach)
- 2007: Cherch (The Movement Group / Koch)
- 2012: America, America (My Destiny / Razor & Tie)
- 2019: Need You

=== As BeBe & CeCe Winans ===
- 1984: Lord Lift Us Up (PTL)
- 1987: BeBe & CeCe Winans (Sparrow / Capitol)
- 1988: Heaven (Sparrow / Capitol)
- 1991: Different Lifestyles (Sparrow / Capitol)
- 1993: First Christmas (Sparrow / Capitol)
- 1994: Relationships (Sparrow / Capitol)
- 1996: Greatest Hits (Sparrow / EMI)
- 2006: The Best of BeBe and CeCe (Sparrow)
- 2009: Still (B&C / Malaco)

=== Singles ===
- 1996: "All of Me" (Myrrh)
- 1997: "In Harm's Way" (Atlantic)
- 1997: "Thank You" (Atlantic)
- 1997: "I Wanna Be the Only One" (with Eternal) (EMI)
- 1997: "Stay" (Atlantic)
- 2000: "Coming Back Home" (Motown)
- 2000: "Jesus Children of America" (Motown)
- 2000: "Tonight Tonight" (Motown)
- 2002: "Do You Know Him" (Motown)
- 2005: "I Have a Dream" (TMG/Still Waters)
- 2005: "Safe from Harm" (TMG/Still Waters)
- 2005: "Love Me Anyway" (TMG/Still Waters)
- 2017: "He Promised Me" (Regimen/Malaco)
- 2018: "Laughter" (Regimen/Malaco)
- 2019: "Free Free" (Regimen/Malaco)
- 2020: "In Jesus Name" (Regimen/Malaco)
- 2020: "Black Lives Matter" (Hidden Beach)
- 2024: "Father In Heaven (Right Now)"(Regimen)

=== Other appearances ===
- 1984: "Give Him Thanks" from Face to Face (Light) with The Winans
- 1984: "Golden Opportunity" from Tomorrow (Light) with The Winans
- 1984: Jesus Commands Us to Go!, Keith Green (background)
- 1986: "Its Only Natural" and "Arms of Love" from Kaleidoscope (Dayspring) with Keith Thomas
- 1987: "Abundant Life" from Ron Winans Family & Friends Choir Vol. I (Selah)
- 1987: "Love Is You" from Daniel Winans & Second Half (A&M) duet with Marvin Winans
- 1988: Live: Radically Saved, Carman (background)
- 1989: "Do You Feel Their Pain?" from Justice (Sparrow) duet with Steve Camp
- 1991: "A Song of Consecration" from Ron Winans Family & Friends Choir Vol. III (Selah)
- 1992: "I'm Going Up" from White Men Can't Jump (soundtrack) (EMI) with CeCe
- 1992: "Still Called Today" from The Great Adventure (Sparrow) with Steven Curtis Chapman
- 1993: "For Unto Us a Child Is Born" from The New Young Messiah (Sparrow) with CeCe
- 1994: "He's on Your Side", duet with Monique Walker on the Hezekiah Walker & The Love Fellowship Choir album, Live in Atlanta at Morehouse College (Benson)
- 1995: "You've Got a Friend" from Tapestry Revisited: A Tribute to Carole King (Atlantic) with CeCe and Aretha Franklin
- 1996: "All of Me" from My Utmost for His Highest: The Covenant (Myrrh)
- 1996: "But God" from Ron Winans Family & Friends Choir Vol. IV (Selah)
- 1997: "I Wanna Be the Only One" with Eternal from Before the Rain (Atlantic/EMI)
- 1998: "He's Coming Soon" from The Apocalypse (soundtrack) (Straightway)
- 1998: "River Jordan" from Civil War: The Nashville Sessions (Atlantic)
- 1998: "One Voice" from Never Say Never (Brandy) (Atlantic)
- 1998: "Stay with Me" from The Prince of Egypt: Inspirational (DreamWorks)
- 1999: "He Watches Over You", duet with Sandi Patty from Songs from the Book (Word)
- 1999: "I Will Follow Christ", as a trio with Bob Carlisle and Clay Crosse
- 2001: "Jesus Children of America" with Marvin Winans and Stevie Wonder from Boycott (HBO Film soundtrack)
- 2006: "Broken Bridges" (CMT film) with Willie Nelson and Toby Keith
- 2007: "I Don't Want to Be Wrong Today" from We Are Family 2007: Artists & Friends for Hurricane Relief (Point of Light Foundation)
- 2010: "We Are the World 25 for Haiti"

== Books ==
The Whitney I Knew, Worthy Publishing, July 2012 ISBN 9781617950841

== Awards and nominations ==
=== GMA Dove Awards ===
The Dove Awards are awarded annually by the Gospel Music Association. Winans has been inducted into the Gospel Music Hall of Fame and has also received 10 awards from and 34 nominations.

Year	Category	Work	Result
1988	Horizon Award - New Artist of the Year	BeBe & CeCe Winans	Won
1988	Contemporary Album of the Year	BeBe & CeCe Winans	Nominated
1988	Song of the Year	"I.O.U. Me"	Nominated
1988	Male Vocalist of the Year	Himself	Nominated
1989	Male Vocalist of the Year	Himself	Nominated
1989	Artist of the Year	BeBe & CeCe Winans	Nominated
1989	Group of the Year	BeBe & CeCe Winans	Won
1990	Group of the Year	BeBe & CeCe Winans	Won
1990	Contemporary Black Gospel Recorded Song of the Year	"With My Whole Heart"	Won
1990	Contemporary Recorded Song of the Year	"Heaven"	Won
1990	Contemporary Album of the Year	Heaven	Won
1990	Short Form Music Video of the Year	Heaven	Nominated
1990	Male Vocalist of the Year	Himself	Nominated
1991	Male Vocalist of the Year	Himself	Nominated
1991	Group of the Year	BeBe & CeCe Winans	Nominated
1991	Contemporary Black Gospel Recorded Song of the Year	"Meantime"	Nominated
1992	Short Form Music Video of the Year	"Addictive Love"	Nominated
1992	Contemporary Black Gospel Recorded Song of the Year	"Addictive Love"	Won
1992	Contemporary Black Gospel Recorded Song of the Year	"I'll Take You There"	Nominated
1992	Rap/Hip Hop/Dance Recorded Song of the Year	"The Blood"	Nominated
1992	Contemporary Album of the Year	Different Lifestyles	Nominated
1992	Artist of the Year	BeBe & CeCe Winans	Nominated
1992	Group of the Year	BeBe & CeCe Winans	Won
1992	Male Vocalist of the Year	Himself	Nominated
1997	Urban Recorded Song of the Year	"Feels Like Heaven (With You)"	Nominated
1998	Contemporary Gospel Recorded Song of the Year	"Up Where We Belong"	Won
1998	Urban Album of the Year	BeBe Winans	Nominated
1998	Urban Recorded Song of the Year	"In Harms Way"	Nominated
1999	Urban Recorded Song of the Year	"In the Midst of the Rain"	Nominated
2001	Urban Album of the Year	Love & Freedom	Nominated
2005	Contemporary Gospel Recorded Song of the Year	"Miracle of Love"	Nominated
2006	Contemporary Gospel Album of the Year	Dream	Nominated
2010	Urban Recorded Song of the Year	"Close To You"	Won
2015	Gospel Music Hall of Fame	BeBe & CeCe Winans	Inducted

=== Grammy Awards ===
The Grammy Awards are awarded annually by the National Academy of Recording Arts and Sciences. Winans has won 6 awards from 21 nominations.

Year	Category	Work	Result
1985	Best Soul Gospel Performance By A Duo Or Group	Lord Lift Us Up	Nominated
1987	Best Gospel Performance, Male	"It's Only Natural"	Nominated
1988	Best Gospel Performance, Male	Call Me	Nominated
1988	Best Soul Gospel Performance By A Duo, Group, Choir Or Chorus	BeBe and CeCe Winans	Nominated
1989	Best Soul Gospel Performance By A Duo, Group, Choir Or Chorus	"Silent Night, Holy Night"	Nominated
1989	Best Soul Gospel Performance, Male	Abundant Life	Won
1990	Best Gospel Vocal Performance, Male	Meantime	Won
1990	Best R&B Performance By A Duo Or Group With Vocal	"Celebrate New Life"	Nominated
1990	Best Gospel Vocal Performance By A Duo Or Group, Choir Or Chorus	"Heaven"	Nominated
1992	Best Contemporary Soul Gospel Album	Different Lifestyles	Won
1994	Album of the Year	The Bodyguard - Original Soundtrack Album	Won
1995	Best Pop/Contemporary Gospel Album	First Christmas	Nominated
1995	Best R&B Performance By A Duo Or Group With Vocal	"If Anything Ever Happened To You"	Nominated
2001	Best R&B Performance By A Duo Or Group With Vocal	"Coming Back Home"	Nominated
2001	Best Contemporary Soul Gospel Album	Love & Freedom	Nominated
2003	Best Contemporary Soul Gospel Album	Live And Up Close	Nominated
2006	Best Contemporary Soul Gospel Album	Dream	Nominated
2008	Best Traditional Gospel Album	Cherch	Nominated
2009	Best Gospel Performance	"I Understand"	Nominated
2011	Best Gospel Performance	"Grace"	Won
2011	Best Contemporary R&B Gospel Album	Still	Won

=== NAACP Image Awards ===
The NAACP Image Awards are awarded annually by the National Association for the Advancement of Colored People (NAACP). Winans has won 5 awards from 10 nominations.

Year	Category	Work	Result
1987	Outstanding Gospel Artist	BeBe & CeCe Winans	Nominated
1989	Outstanding Gospel Artist	BeBe & CeCe Winans	Won
1990	Outstanding Gospel Artist	BeBe & CeCe Winans	Won
1992	Outstanding Gospel Artist	BeBe & CeCe Winans	Won
1993	Outstanding Gospel Artist	BeBe & CeCe Winans	Won
1996	Outstanding Gospel Artist	BeBe & CeCe Winans	Nominated
1997	Outstanding Gospel Artist	BeBe & CeCe Winans	Nominated
1997	Outstanding Duo or Group	BeBe & CeCe Winans	Nominated
2010	Outstanding Gospel Album	Still	Won
2020	Outstanding Gospel/Christian Song – Traditional or Contemporary	"Laughter" (with Korean Soul)	Nominated

=== Soul Train Awards ===
The Soul Train Music Awards are awarded annually. Winans has won 2 awards from 9 nominations.

Year	Category	Work	Result
1989	Best R&B/Urban Contemporary New Artist	BeBe & CeCe Winans	Nominated
1990	Best Gospel Album	Heaven	Won
1992	Best Gospel Album	Different Lifestyles	Won
1992	Best R&B/Soul Album – Group, Band or Duo	Different Lifestyles	Nominated
1992	R&B/Soul Song of the Year	"Different Lifestyles"	Nominated
1995	Best Gospel Album	Relationships	Nominated
2009	Best Gospel Performance – Male, Female or Group	"Close to You"	Nominated
2019	Best Gospel/Inspirational Award	Himself	Nominated
2020	Best Gospel/Inspirational Award	Himself	Nominated

=== Stellar Awards ===
The Stellar Awards are awarded annually by SAGMA. Winans has won 10 awards from 17 nominations.

Year	Category	Work	Result
1988	Best New Gospel Artist	BeBe & CeCe Winans	Won
1990	Best Inspirational Gospel Performance	BeBe & CeCe Winans	Won
1990	Best Performance by Duo or Group	BeBe & CeCe Winans	Won
1990	Urban/Inspiration Single or the Performance of the Year	"Celebrate New Life"	Won
1990	Contemporary Song of the year	Heaven	Won
1990	Contemporary Album of the Year	Heaven	Won
1992	Best Gospel Album	Different Lifestyles	Won
2002	Contemporary Male Vocalist of the Year	Love & Freedom	Nominated
2006	Song of the Year	"Safe From Harm"	Nominated
2011	Music Video of the Year	"Close to You"	Won
2011	Song of the Year	"Close to You"	Won
2011	Urban/ Inspirational Single / Performance of the Year	"Still"	Won
2011	Artist of the Year	BeBe & CeCe Winans	Nominated
2011	Contemporary Group/ Duo of the Year	BeBe & CeCe Winans	Nominated
2011	Group Duo of the Year	BeBe & CeCe Winans	Nominated
2011	Contemporary CD of the Year	Still	Nominated
2011	Special Event CD of the Year	Still	Nominated

=== Miscellaneous awards and honors ===
Year	Award	Category	Work	Result
2009	Michigan's International Gospel Music Hall of Fame		Himself	Inducted
2011	Trumpet Awards	Spirit Enlightenment Award	BeBe & CeCe Winans	Honored
2011	Hollywood Walk of Fame		BeBe & CeCe Winans	Inducted
2022	Black Music & Entertainment Walk of Fame		BeBe & CeCe Winans	Inducted

== See also ==
- The Winans family
