= Up Where We Belong =

1982 single by Joe Cocker and Jennifer Warnes

Single by Joe Cocker and Jennifer Warnes

from the album An Officer and a Gentleman
- B-side: "Sweet Lil' Woman" (Cocker)
- Released: July 22, 1982
- Recorded: Los Angeles, 1982
- Genre: Pop; soft rock; easy listening
- Length: 4:00 (single); 3:55 (album)
- Label: Island
- Composers: Jack Nitzsche; Buffy Sainte-Marie
- Lyricist: Will Jennings
- Producer: Stewart Levine

Joe Cocker singles chronology
"Talking Back to the Night" (1982)	"Up Where We Belong" (1982)	"Threw It Away" (1983)

Jennifer Warnes singles chronology
"Come to Me" (1982)	"Up Where We Belong" (1982)	"Nights Are Forever" (1983)

"Up Where We Belong" is a song written by Jack Nitzsche, Buffy Sainte-Marie and Will Jennings that was recorded by Joe Cocker and Jennifer Warnes for the 1982 film An Officer and a Gentleman. Warnes was recommended to sing a song from the film because of her previous soundtrack successes, and she had the idea for the song to be a duet that she would perform with Cocker. Jennings selected various sections of the score by Nitzsche and Sainte-Marie in creating the structure of the song and added lyrics about the struggles of life and love and the obstacles that people overcome. It was released in July of that year to coincide with the release of the film.

The song reached number one on the Billboard Hot 100 in the US and topped the charts in several other countries. It also sold more than one million copies in the US and was recognized by the Recording Industry Association of America as one of the Songs of the Century. Cocker and Warnes were awarded the Grammy for Best Pop Performance by a Duo or Group with Vocals, and Nitzsche, Sainte-Marie, and Jennings won both the Academy Award and Golden Globe Award for Best Original Song. Despite the song's success, some industry observers believed it took Cocker away from his musical roots.

In 1984, the gospel duo BeBe & CeCe Winans recorded a religious variation of the song that received airplay on Christian radio stations, and their remake in 1996 earned them a GMA Dove Award.

== Background ==
On February 24, 1982, Joe Cocker performed "I'm So Glad I'm Standing Here Today" with the jazz group the Crusaders at the Grammy Awards. Their collaboration on the song for a Crusaders album had earned a nomination that year in the category of Best Inspirational Performance. Singer-songwriter Jennifer Warnes saw the show from home. She had been a fan of Cocker's since her teens and at one time had a poster of him on her wall showing him performing at Woodstock, and her love for the singer was still evident on this night many years later. "I was so moved, I was hollering out loud with joy, jumping up and down ... After a difficult battle with drugs and alcohol, Joe was in total command once again. I knew at that moment that I would sing with Joe."

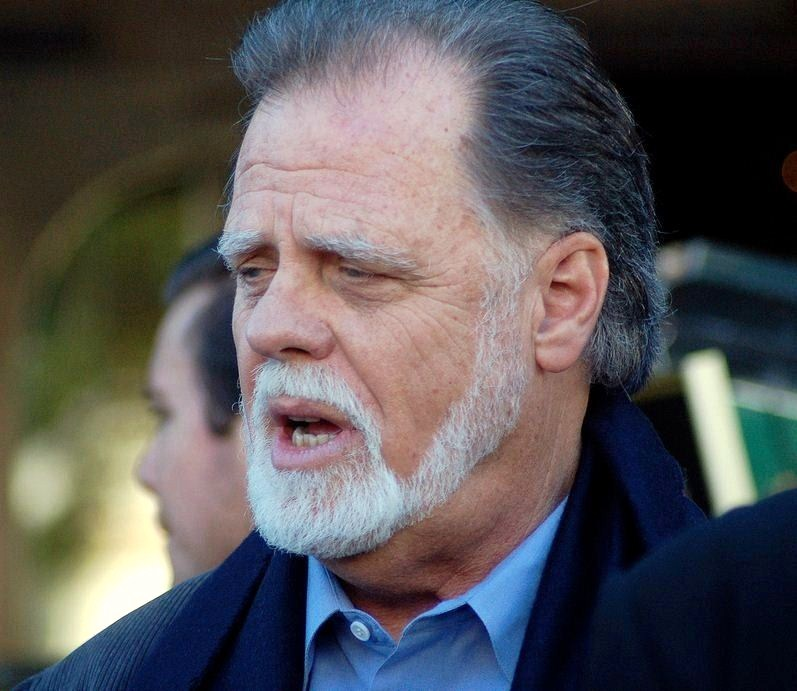
Director Taylor Hackford was not given the budget for a new song to be produced for An Officer and a Gentleman.

Meanwhile, plans were being made for An Officer and a Gentleman to be distributed by Paramount Pictures, and studio executive Frank Mancuso was insistent upon having some kind of music to use to promote the film. The director of the film, Taylor Hackford, was also interested in producing an original title song to help market it, but there was no remaining budget for such a recording. He proceeded with the idea anyway, working with Joel Sill, who was head of music at Paramount at the time, without anyone else at the studio knowing that they were doing so. The director consulted his friend Gary George to select a recording artist for the song. George, the former head of publicity at Warner Bros. Records, had recently become a manager and suggested Warnes, who was a client of his.

The original idea to sing with Joe was mine.

— Jennifer Warnes

One of the six songs that Warnes had placed in the top half of the Billboard Hot 100 at that point was the number six hit "Right Time of the Night" from 1977. Her soundtrack credits included the Oscar-nominated "One More Hour" from Ragtime and the Oscar-winning "It Goes Like It Goes" from Norma Rae, which, like the Hackford film, also had a lead female character who worked in a factory. Hackford initially rejected the idea of Warnes singing a song for An Officer and a Gentleman "because he felt she had too sweet a sound," but Warnes met with Sill and discussed the possibility of doing so: "I suggested to Joel that I sing on that film in a duet with Joe Cocker." Sill thought this was an interesting idea but needed to convince Hackford of that. He said, "I discussed with Taylor, since the film centered really around Richard [Gere] and Debra [Winger] primarily, that maybe we should have a duet" and that with Cocker and Warnes they would be "matching the characters to some degree. The dynamic between the two was the soft and the rough, that, to some degree, Debra Winger's character was very, very soft in the picture, even though she was in a rough environment. And Richard Gere's character, to some degree, was really a rough character until he was softened up by her." Hackford thought the idea had potential and now had another friend in the music industry to ask for a favor. Chris Blackwell was the owner of Island Records, and Cocker was now recording for Island. "I called Chris and said I want to do this, and he just, on the phone, said, 'OK, I'll make this happen.'" What would initially convince Cocker to work on the project, however, was a small portion of the lyrics. He described it as "the 'Up' part, which is what made me realize it had hit potential. It was so unusual – that 'Love, lift us up ... '"

== Composition and lyrics ==
"Up Where We Belong" – chorus
The part of the chorus with the lyric "Love, lift us up", which was what drew Joe Cocker to the song.

The last scene of the film brought the story to a happy ending, and Hackford wanted to have a song playing during the closing credits that would act as a reflection of the relationship portrayed and incorporate the score composed by Jack Nitzsche. Nitzsche was having trouble writing a theme as he was scoring the film, and his longtime friend Buffy Sainte-Marie played him the melody for a song she had started working on called "Up Where We Belong". Nitzsche wanted to have Sainte-Marie write the rest of the lyrics, but her background in folk music caused Sill and Hackford to look elsewhere. Sill invited a lyricist whom he'd worked with before, Will Jennings, to the studio to view a rough cut of the film, and that gave Jennings inspiration for the structure and lyrics of what became "Up Where We Belong". "And all through the film I was hearing these bits and pieces of music, and at the end of it I had it in my head, you know, how there was a song. I heard a chorus here and a verse here and a bridge there, and so when I finished, Joel was there, and I said, 'Joel, just give me all the music from it,' all of Nitzsche's music, ' 'cause I got an idea.'" When Jennings presented Hackford with his demo, the director felt it was the perfect fit.

"Up Where We Belong" is written in common time. It is in the key of D major and sung in a vocal range from A_{3} to G_{5}, then shifts up to E♭ major for the final choruses. The lyrics "tell of the struggles of life and love and the obstacles in the way that we attempt to dodge."

== Recording and aftermath ==
I almost didn't want to record ["Up Where We Belong"]—the demo was dreadful!

— Joe Cocker

Sill described Stewart Levine as the "record producer who we felt would give us the right interpretation of the song, add some soulfulness to it and also make it a hit record at the same time," but Levine was hesitant about traveling from his home in upstate New York to California for the job. He felt it would be worthwhile, however, because Jennings was involved. When Jennings played the demo over the phone for him, Levine responded that it was "great", and Warnes was certain "Up Where We Belong" would be a hit. Cocker, on the other hand, described the demo as "dreadful", despite his appreciation of some of the lyrics and the fact that Jennings was the lyricist on "I'm So Glad I'm Standing Here Today" and his more recent single, "Talking Back to the Night".

"Up Where We Belong" – movie version
A part of the song taken from the version heard over the closing credits

"Up Where We Belong" – single version
The same part of the song as heard on the hit record

Cocker wanted to make the recording by himself, so Levine had Warnes record her vocals separately. Cocker had taken a break from touring to fly to Los Angeles for the session, but when it came time to record he, as Hackford described it, "was terrified. He didn't even want to go into the studio. Stewart Levine had to go and talk him out of the hotel to get him there." Cocker admitted, "I'd sat with the words in the afternoon but still hadn't remembered them, so we had to draw 'em up on big blocks of wood and stuff." A recording was made where the two voices were spliced together, but Warnes explained how persuasive their producer was in getting Cocker to agree to record the song alongside her: "Stewart Levine was gently insistent on the duet. Stewart understood that the contrast in our voices, the aural chemistry, would work. So Joe and I sang the song together. One or two takes, that was all." Cocker came around to seeing a hit song once it was complete, saying, "I knew it was a number one. Other people were saying, 'Well ... perhaps', but I could just feel it."

Hackford said that "the final version was absolute magic—or at least Joel and I thought so." They now had to present this song that they were not budgeted to make to the executives at Paramount. "When we played it for Michael Eisner and Don Simpson, they hated the record and said it would never be a hit." Simpson even bet Sill $100 that it wouldn't be. Hackford and Sill "called another prominent record executive, who said, 'Forget it. Jennifer Warnes has never had a hit song and Joe Cocker's a has-been.'" Eisner and Simpson made Hackford "meet with various recording artist friends of theirs who tried to write songs, but their title songs didn't fit the movie." Hackford said, "Finally, one of the famous artists who was involved looked at the movie and said, to his credit, 'Hey, I can write something, but it's not going to work as well as the song you've got.'" Because they were running out of time before the film's release, Eisner and Simpson finally gave in, and "Up Where We Belong" made the final cut of the film and was released as a single on July 22, 1982.

== Reception ==
Some radio stations refused to play "Up Where We Belong", even going so far as to send their copies back to Island Records. Cocker said, "I remember going into their offices in New York. I walked in and I said, 'How's the single doing?' And this guy Mike Abrahams, who worked there, he said, 'This is how well it's doing'—and the office was piled with returns." The single may have been recorded to promote the film, but Warnes pointed out that, in a sense, the success of the film was what sold the record.

"Up Where We Belong" debuted on the Billboard Hot 100 in the issue dated August 21 of that year and spent three weeks at number one during its 23 weeks there. That same issue also marked its first appearance on the magazine's list of the 50 most popular Adult Contemporary songs in the US, where it stayed for 25 weeks, 6 of which were at its peak position at number three. It also reached number seven on the UK Singles Chart in 1983 and received a Gold certification from the British Phonographic Industry (BPI) on January 6, 2023, for reaching sales and streams of 400,000 units. The Recording Industry Association of America (RIAA) awarded the song both Gold and Platinum certification for achieving sales of 500,000 and one million copies, respectively, on January 17, 1989.

Billboard reviewed the single at the time of its release in their July 31 issue. "This unlikely vocal pairing could prove less of a long shot than it sounds, given the recent gains made by other soundtrack associations. Add radio's ongoing affection for strong duets and a restrained performance by Cocker that matches him more sympathetically with Warnes's gentler style, and this track should find friends at A/C and mainstream pop stations." Matthew Greenwald of AllMusic wrote, "A gospel-inspired piece of pop song craftsmanship, the song moves with an underlying grace and subtle beauty. Faith, virtue, and, yes, the power of love is at the lyrical core here, and [the songwriters] convey this with a literate and timeless style. Truly a modern-day pop standard."

== Awards and accolades ==
On January 29, 1983, Jennings, Nitzsche, and Sainte-Marie won the Golden Globe Award for Best Original Song. Cocker and Warnes won the Grammy Award for Best Pop Performance by a Duo or Group with Vocals on February 23 of that year. Two months later, on April 11, the songwriters won the Academy Award for Best Original Song. They also won the BAFTA film award for Best Original Song in 1984. On the Songs of the Century list compiled by the RIAA in 2001, the song was listed at number 323. In 2004, it finished at number 75 on AFI's 100 Years ... 100 Songs survey of top tunes in American cinema, and in 2016, one of the duo's live renditions of the song was listed at number 18 on Rolling Stone magazine's list of the 20 Greatest Best Song Oscar Performances. In 2020, it was included on Billboard magazine's list of the 25 Greatest Love Song Duets.

== Live performances ==
Singing with Joe was often risky and always thrilling

— Jennifer Warnes

Warnes and Cocker kept to an agreement that they would never lip-sync their performances of the song. One of their earliest live appearances was on the November 20, 1982, episode of Solid Gold. Saturday Night Live followed on February 5, 1983, and their performance at the 25th Annual Grammy Awards came later that month, on February 23. Backstage at the Grammys Warnes said about working with Cocker, "I was told it was the weirdest pairing ever," and regarding their April 11 appearance at the 55th Academy Awards, she admitted, "Neither of us were comfortable in the Oscar world. Joe performing in a white tuxedo, me in pink taffeta—how absurd."

In 2013, Cocker was honored in Berlin with a Goldene Kamera award, and Warnes joined him to sing the song at the ceremony. The day after Cocker's death in 2014, Warnes wrote, "I realized yesterday that we will never sing our song again. That thought makes me feel sick. We met last year in Berlin to sing together. I didn't know that would be our last time." Her visceral reaction to his death parallels the powerful chemistry they had in their many performances of the song, which she had summed up years earlier: "I always thought the pairing had a strong ring of truth to it. It was so unlikely, because Joe has this well-known, very raw, masculine energy. I was less well known and had this very vulnerable, quintessential female energy and we were very polarized, as men and women often are these days. But we met in the middle."

== Legacy ==
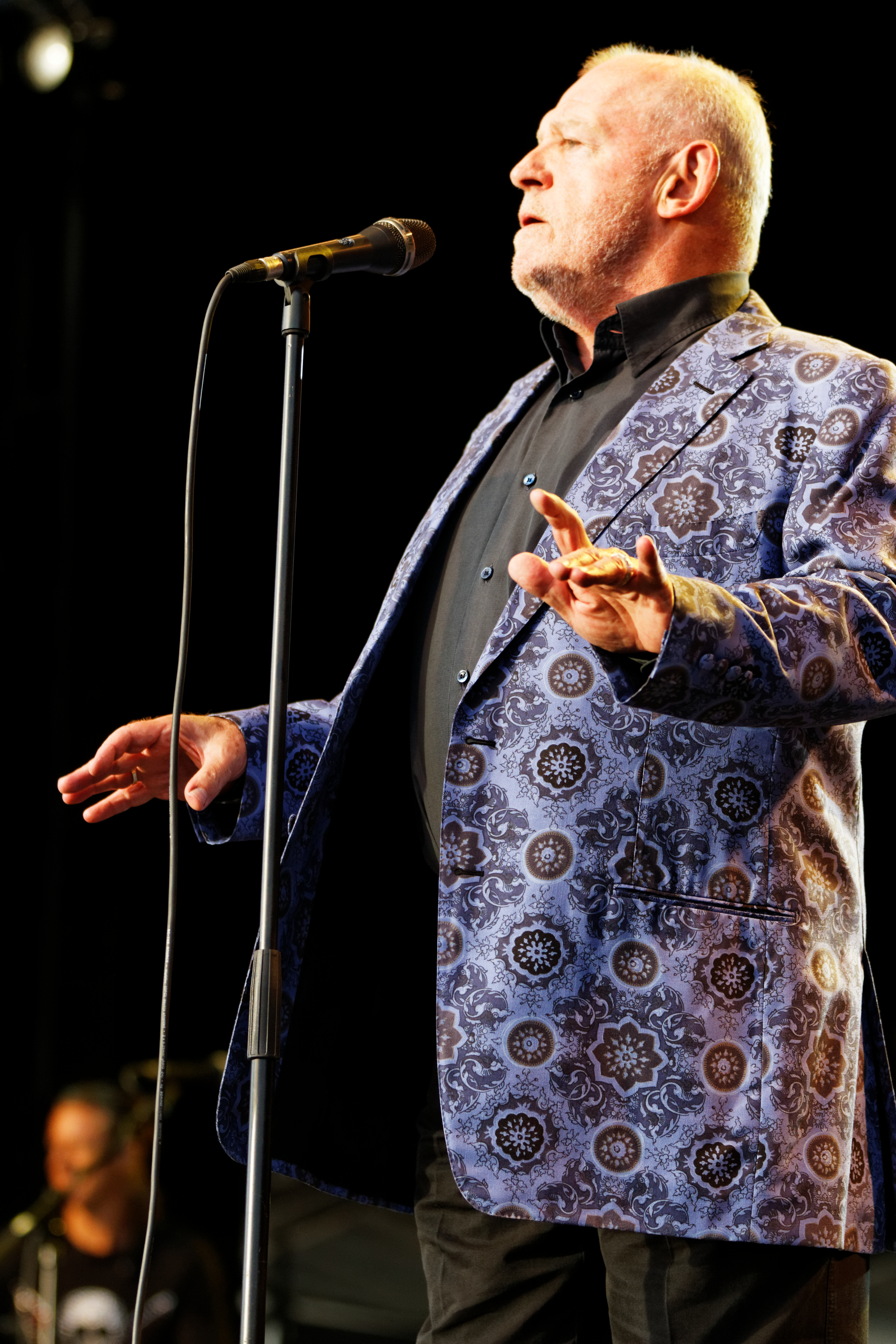
Joe Cocker strayed from his rock/blues roots in recording "Up Where We Belong".

The success of "Up Where We Belong" was not without its drawbacks for Cocker. He admitted that Island Records owner Chris Blackwell also hated the song and was not interested in releasing it. They had put out Cocker's first project for the label, Sheffield Steel, in June 1982, just a month before the song needed to be on store shelves if it was to coincide with the opening of the film. Cocker said, "The song was recorded within a matter of hours. Sheffield Steel – I spent a year on that. And the single eclipsed it overnight." But even ignoring its success, Blackwell was bothered by the fact that the duet was not R&B, which is what he was aiming for on Sheffield Steel.

Stewart Levine produced Cocker's next LP, which was intended for Island, but, the singer revealed, as with the duet, Blackwell hated it, so Cocker left Island for Capitol. The new label also had reservations about the number of slow ballads included on the new project. Another producer was brought in to give the album a different tone, and the result was the 1984 release Civilized Man. Peaking at number 133 on the Billboard 200, it was his lowest charting studio album in the US at that point.

Capitol had been responsible for rejuvenating the careers of Tina Turner and Heart in the mid-80s, so a push was on to do so for their new client with his next project, the 1986 album Cocker. Capitol's vice president of a&r, Don Grierson, explained, "After Civilized Man came out, Joe, Michael Lang [Cocker's manager], and I spent a lot of time zeroing in on just what the heck Joe Cocker was really all about. And it's my firm belief that Joe is a rocker." His feeling was that "Up Where We Belong" turned out to be a double-edged sword. "It helped Joe in one sense, but it was very, very detrimental to him in another. It gave him a hit record and brought his name back to the mass market again. However, because it was such a pop, middle-of-the-road record, it took away Joe's roots in the eyes of the public and certainly in the industry."

== Credits and personnel ==
Credits adapted from album liner notes for The Best of Joe Cocker.

- Joe Cocker – lead vocals
- Jennifer Warnes – lead vocals
- Stewart Levine – producer
- Abraham Laboriel – bass
- Leon "Ndugu" Chancler – drums
- Louis Shelton – guitar
- Bobby Lyle – keyboards
- Robbie Buchanan – keyboards
- Paulinho da Costa – percussion

== Charts ==
=== Weekly charts ===
Chart (1982–1983)	Peak position
Australia (Kent Music Report)	1
Austria (Ö3 Austria Top 40)	14
Belgium (Ultratop 50 Flanders)	32
Canada Top Singles (RPM)	1
Canada Adult Contemporary (RPM)	2
Finland (Suomen virallinen lista)	13
Ireland (IRMA)	3
New Zealand (Recorded Music NZ)	3
Norway (VG-lista)	3
South Africa (Springbok Radio)	1
Spain (AFYVE)	2
Sweden (Sverigetopplistan)	3
Switzerland (Schweizer Hitparade)	7
UK Singles (Official Charts)	7
US Billboard Hot 100	1
US Adult Contemporary (Billboard)	3
US Cash Box Top 100	1
West Germany (Offiziele Deutsche Charts)	6

2026 weekly chart performance
Chart (2026)	Peak position
Norway Airplay (IFPI Norge)	53

=== Year-end charts ===
Chart (1982)	Rank
Canada Top Singles (RPM)	23
US Cash Box	9

Chart (1983)	Rank
Australia (Kent Music Report)	5
South Africa (Springbok Radio)	4
UK (Gallup)	56
US Billboard Hot 100	27
US Adult Contemporary (Billboard)	45

== Certifications and sales ==
Region	Certification	Certified units/sales
Australia (ARIA)	Gold	35,000^{^}
Canada (Music Canada)	Gold	50,000^{^}
Denmark (IFPI Danmark)	Gold	45,000^{‡}
Spain (Promusicae)	Gold	25,000^{^}
United Kingdom (BPI)	Gold	400,000^{‡}
United States (RIAA)	Platinum	1,000,000^{^}
^{^} Shipments figures based on certification alone.^{‡} Sales+streaming figures based on certification alone.

== Cover versions and parodies ==
Televangelist Tammy Faye Bakker suggested that BeBe & CeCe Winans, two of the singers from The PTL Club, record "Up Where We Belong" after she heard the original duet in a record store, and Larnelle Harris helped BeBe make the lyrics more appealing to a Christian audience. Their 1984 cover of the song from their album Lord Lift Us Up reached number 27 on the Christian Radio Hits chart issued by SoundScan. The duo rerecorded their gospel version in 1996 for their Greatest Hits album, and their new version won the 1998 GMA Dove Award for Contemporary Gospel Song of the Year.

== See also ==
- List of number-one singles of 1982 (Canada)
- List of Billboard Hot 100 number-one singles of 1982
- List of number-one singles in Australia during the 1980s

== Bibliography ==
- Bean, J. P. (2003), Joe Cocker: The Authorised Biography, Virgin Books, ISBN 1852270438
- British Film Institute (1985), Ellis, Mundy (ed.), BFI Film and Television Yearbook 85, Concert Publications, ISBN 0851701833
- Bronson, Fred (2003), The Billboard Book of Number One Hits, Billboard Books, ISBN 9780823076772
- Byrge, Duane (2016), Behind the Scenes with Hollywood Producers: Interviews with 14 Top Film Creators, McFarland, ISBN 9780786472116
- Carpenter, Bil (2005), Uncloudy Days: The Gospel Music Encyclopedia, Hal Leonard, ISBN 9780879308414
- Leszczak, Bob (2016), Dynamic Duets: The Best Pop Collaborations from 1955 to 1999, Rowman & Littlefield, ISBN 9781442271494
- Nyman, Jake (2005), Suomi soi 4: Suuri suomalainen listakirja (in Finnish) (1st ed.), Tammi, ISBN 951-31-2503-3
- O'Neil, Thomas (1999), The Grammys, Perigree Books, ISBN 0-399-52477-0
- Powell, Mark Allan (2002), Encyclopedia of Contemporary Christian Music, Hendrickson Publishers, ISBN 1565636791
- Roberts, David (2006), British Hit Singles & Albums (19th ed.), Guinness World Records, ISBN 1-904994-10-5
- Sheward, David (1997), The Big Book of Show Business Awards, Billboard Books, ISBN 0-8230-7630-X
- Whitburn, Joel (2007), Joel Whitburn Presents Billboard Top Adult Songs, 1961–2006, Record Research, ISBN 978-0898201697
- Whitburn, Joel (2009), Joel Whitburn's Top Pop Singles, 1955–2008, Record Research, ISBN 978-0898201802
- Wiley, Mason; Bona, Damien (1996), Inside Oscar: The Unofficial History of the Academy Awards, Ballantine Books, ISBN 0345400534
