= Forever Yours (Tony Terry album) =

Studio album by Tony Terry
- Released: 1987
- Genre: R&B; new jack swing; soul; freestyle
- Length: 41:41
- Label: Epic
- Producer: Cherrie Shepherd (exec.); Ted Currier; David Sanchez

Tony Terry chronology
Forever Yours (1987)	Tony Terry (1990)

Professional ratings
Review scores
Source	Rating
Allmusic	3/5 stars
ARTISTdirect	3/5 stars
New Musical Express	10/10

Forever Yours is the debut album released in 1987 on Epic Records by R&B singer Tony Terry. The album peaked at #27 on the Billboard R&B Albums charts, and includes the charting singles "Forever Yours", "Lovey Dovey", and "She's Fly".

== Track listing ==
Side 1

1. "Forever Yours" – 3:44
2. "Lovey Dovey" – 3:37
3. "Fulltime Girl" – 3:11
4. "Day Dreaming" – 3:54
5. "Here With Me" – 4:34

Side 2

1. "She's Fly" – 6:04
2. "Wassup Wit U" – 3:40
3. "Up & Down Love" – 4:11
4. "Young Love" – 3:58
5. "What Would It Take" – 4:42

== Charts ==
=== Album ===
Chart (1988)	Peak position
US Billboard 200	151
US Top R&B/Hip-Hop Albums (Billboard)	27

=== Singles ===
Title	Release date	U.S. Billboard R&B Singles	U.S. Billboard Hot 100	UK Singles Chart
"She's Fly"	1987	10	80	—
"Forever Yours"	1988	16	80	—
"Lovey Dovey"	1988	4	—	44
"Young Love"	1988	88	—	94
