= With You (Tony Terry song) =

1991 single by Tony Terry

Single by Tony Terry

from the album Tony Terry
- Released: March 4, 1991
- Recorded: 1990
- Genre: R&B
- Length: 5:04
- Label: Epic
- Songwriter(s): Raymond Reeder
- Producer(s): Ted Currier

Tony Terry singles chronology
"Head over Heels" (1990)	"With You" (1991)	"That Kind of Guy" (1991)

Music video
- "With You" on YouTube

"With You" is a song performed by American contemporary R&B singer Tony Terry; issued as the second single from his eponymous second studio album. The song is his only hit to date on the Billboard Hot 100, peaking at #14 on the chart in 1991.

== Music video ==
The official music video for "With You" was produced by Anita Baker and directed by Blair Underwood.

== Chart positions ==
Chart (1991)	Peak position
US Billboard Hot 100	14
US Hot R&B/Hip-Hop Singles & Tracks (Billboard)	6
