= 1995 Soul Train Music Awards =

Music awards ceremony in Los Angeles, US

Soul Train Music Awards
- Date: March 13, 1995
- Location: Shrine Auditorium, Los Angeles, California
- Country: United States
- Hosted by: Anita Baker, Patti LaBelle and Babyface
- First award: 1987

Highlights
- Most awards: Anita Baker, Boyz II Men and Barry White (2)
- Website: soultrain.com

Television/radio coverage
- Network: WGN America

The 1995 Soul Train Music Awards was held on March 13, 1995, at the Shrine Auditorium in Los Angeles, California. The show honored the best in R&B, soul, rap, jazz, and gospel music from the previous year. The show was hosted by Anita Baker, Babyface and Patti LaBelle.

== Special awards ==
=== Heritage Award for Career Achievement ===
- Diana Ross

=== Sammy Davis Jr. Award for Entertainer of the Year ===
- Queen Latifah

== Winners and nominees ==
Winners are in bold text.

=== R&B/Soul Album of the Year – Male ===
- **Gerald Levert – Groove On**
  - R. Kelly - 12 Play
  - Keith Sweat – Get Up on It
  - Luther Vandross – Songs

=== R&B/Soul Album of the Year – Female ===
- **Anita Baker – Rhythm of Love**
  - Aaliyah – Age Ain't Nothing but a Number
  - Brandy – Brandy
  - Me'Shell Ndegeocello – Plantation Lullabies

=== R&B/Soul Album of the Year – Group, Band or Duo ===
- **Boyz II Men – II**
  - Blackstreet – Blackstreet
  - Jodeci – Diary of a Mad Band
  - Zhané – Pronounced Jah-Nay

=== Best R&B/Soul Single – Male ===
- **R. Kelly – "Bump n' Grind"**
  - Babyface – "When Can I See You"
  - Aaron Hall – "I Miss You"
  - Barry White – "Practice What You Preach"

=== Best R&B/Soul Single – Female ===
- **Anita Baker – "Body and Soul"**
  - Brandy – "I Wanna Be Down"
  - Toni Braxton – "You Mean the World to Me"
  - Janet Jackson – "Any Time, Any Place"

=== Best R&B/Soul Single – Group, Band or Duo ===
- **Boyz II Men – "I'll Make Love to You"**
  - 69 Boyz – "Tootsee Roll"
  - Blackstreet – "Before I Let You Go"
  - Bossman and Blakjak – "Much Love"

=== R&B/Soul or Rap Song of the Year ===
- **69 Boyz – "Tootsee Roll"**
  - Barry White – "Practice What You Preach"
  - Boyz II Men – "I'll Make Love to You"
  - R. Kelly – "Bump n' Grind"

=== Best R&B/Soul or Rap Music Video ===
- **Aaron Hall – "I Miss You"**
  - Anita Baker – "Body & Soul"
  - Boyz II Men – "Silent Night"
  - Coolio – "Fantastic Voyage"

=== Best R&B/Soul or Rap New Artist ===
- **Brandy**
  - 69 Boyz
  - Aaliyah
  - Tanya Blount

=== Best Rap Album ===
- **Snoop Doggy Dogg – Doggystyle**
  - Bone Thugs-N-Harmony – Creepin on ah Come Up
  - Scarface – The Diary
  - Warren G – Regulate...G Funk Era

=== Best Jazz Album ===
- **Norman Brown – After the Storm**
  - Gerald Albright – Smooth
  - Various Artists – A Tribute to Miles
  - Joshua Redman Quartet – Moodswing

=== Best Gospel Album ===
- **Sounds of Blackness – Africa to America: The Journey of the Drum**
  - Helen Baylor – The Live Experience
  - Hezekiah Walker & the Fellowship Crusade Choir – Live in Atlanta at Morehouse College
  - BeBe & CeCe Winans – Relationships

== Presenters ==
- Sounds of Blackness, Toni Braxton, and Blair Underwood - Presented Best R&B Soul/Rap New Artist
- Naughty By Nature - Presented Sammy Davis Jr. For Award Entertainer of the Year
- Karyn White, Jerry Rice, and Halle Berry - Presented Best R&B Soul Single Group, Band, or Duo
- MC Hammer, Veronica Webb, and Zhane Presented Best Jazz Album
- Gerald Albright, Chelsi Smith, and Chante Moore - Presented Best Rap Album
- Helen Baylor, Robert Townsend, and 69 Boyz - Presented Best R&B Soul Single Female
- Snoop Doggy Dogg, Me'Shell Ndegeocello, and Victoria Rowell - Presented Best R&B Soul/Rap Music Video
- Bill Bellamy, Jasmine Guy, and Mary J. Blige - Presented Best R&B Soul Single Male
- Norman Brown, Garcelle Beauvais, and Brownstone - Presented Best Gospel Album
- Berry Gordy - Presented Heritage Award For Career Achievement
- Aaron Hall, Salt-n-Pepa, and Sinbad - Best R&B Soul/Rap Song of the Year
- Jackee Harry, Thelma Houston, and Immature - Presented Best R&B Soul Album Group, Band, or Duo
- BeBe & CeCe Winans and Bone Thugs-N-Harmony - Presented Best R&B Soul Album Male
- Mario Van Peebles, Salli Richardson, and Scarface - Presented Best R&B Soul Album Female
