= BeBe & CeCe Winans (album) =

Studio album by BeBe & CeCe Winans
- Released: January 1987
- Recorded: 1986
- Genre: Contemporary Gospel, contemporary Christian
- Length: 42:53
- Label: Sparrow / Capitol
- Producer: Keith Thomas

BeBe & CeCe Winans chronology
Lord Lift Us Up (1984)	BeBe & CeCe Winans (1987)	Heaven (1988)

BeBe & CeCe Winans is the self-titled second studio album by American gospel singing duo BeBe & CeCe Winans, released in 1987 on Capitol Records. The album reached number 12 on the Billboard Top Gospel Albums chart, and features the hit singles "Change Your Nature", "I.O.U. Me" and "Love Said Not So". CeCe Winans won a Grammy Award for Best Soul Gospel Performance, Female for the song "For Always."

== Track listing ==
No.	Title	Writer(s)	Length
1.	"I. O. U. Me"	BeBe Winans, Billy Sprague, Keith Thomas, Michael Rapp, Tom Hemby	4:42
2.	"I Don't Know Why"	B. Winans	3:58
3.	"For Always"	B. Winans, Sprague, Thomas	4:02
4.	"No Hiding Place"	B. Winans, Percy Bady	3:17
5.	"Still in Love with You"	B. Winans	4:02
6.	"Call Me"	B. Winans, Thomas	5:18
7.	"Love Said Not So"	B. Winans, Bady	4:30
8.	"Change Your Nature"	B. Winans	4:56
9.	"In Return"	Marvin Winans	3:47
10.	"He's Coming Soon"	B. Winans	4:21

== Personnel ==
- BGVs arranged by BeBe Winans, CeCe Winans, Keith Thomas and Marvin Winans
- BeBe Winans – lead and backing vocals
- CeCe Winans – lead and backing vocals
- Angie Winans, BeBe Winans, CeCe Winans, Constance Jackson, Debra K. Winans, Debra R. Winans, Kevin Jackson, Michael Winans, Regina Winans, Ronald Winans and Vicki Winans – additional backing vocals
- The Winans – backing vocals (2, 7)

Musicians

- Keith Thomas – keyboards, string arrangements
- Derrick Lee – acoustic piano (10)
- BeBe Winans – organ (10)
- Tom Hemby – guitars
- Jimmie Lee Sloas – bass
- Mark Hammond – drums, drum programming
- Mark Douthit – saxophone

== Production ==
- Producer – Keith Thomas
- Executive Producers – Michael Brown and Wayne Edwards
- Production Assistance – Brett Perry
- Recorded and Mixed by Jeff Balding
- Assistant Engineers – Bill Heath, Michael Koreba and Billy Whitington.
- Recorded at Gold Mine Studio East (Brentwood, TN); OmniSound Studios Hummingbird Studios and Bullet Recording Studios (Nashville, TN).
- Mixed at OmniSound Studios and Digital Recorders (Nashville, TN).
- Mastered by Steve Hall at Future Disc (Hollywood, CA).
- Art Direction and Design – Kevin Hossman
- Photography – Mark Tucker

Tracks and credits taken from album liner notes.

== Charts ==
Chart (1987)	Peak position
U.S. Billboard 200	–
U.S. Billboard Top R&B/Hip-Hop Albums	49
U.S. Billboard Top Gospel Albums	12

Singles

Year	Title	US Christian
1987	"I.O.U. Me"	2
1987	"Love Said Not So"	11
1988	"Change Your Nature"	8
