= Tony Terry =

American singer

- Also known as: Tony Terry
- Born: Antonio Terry; March 12, 1964 (age 62); Pinehurst, North Carolina, United States
- Genres: R&B, soul, new jack swing
- Occupations: Singer, actor
- Instrument: Vocals
- Years active: 1981–present
- Labels: Epic, Virgin, Spectra Music Group

Antonio "Tony" Terry (born March 12, 1964) is an American soul/new jack swing singer and actor from Washington, D.C., who had several R&B hits in the late 1980s and early 1990s. He is best known for his 1991 single "With You" which peaked at number 14 on the Billboard Hot 100.

== Career ==
=== Music ===
Terry is a graduate of the Duke Ellington School of the Arts in Washington, DC. After graduating, he landed backing vocalist jobs for the freestyle/pop group Sweet Sensation, and hip-hop group The Boogie Boys. In 1987, he signed a recording contract with Epic/CBS Records. His first single, "She's Fly", was released the same year, and peaked at number 10 on the Billboard R&B singles chart. Forever Yours, Terry's debut album for Epic, was released in 1988, and reached the top 40 of Billboard's R&B albums chart. The follow-up single, "Lovey Dovey", reached number four on the R&B charts, and "Forever Yours" climbed into the R&B top 20. In 1989, Tony was featured in a duet with Flame on the song "On the Strength", which reached number 59 on the Billboard R&B singles chart and number 11 on the Billboard Dance/Club Play chart.

Terry's self-titled second album, released in 1990, included the single "With You" (his biggest hit), which reached the top 20 of the U.S. Billboard Hot 100, as well as the top 10 on the R&B chart. "Everlasting Love", was a number-six R&B hit. After leaving Epic, Terry moved over to Virgin Records. His debut album for that label was 1994's Heart of a Man. The single, "When a Man Cries", reached Billboards R&B top 40. The following year, Terry contributed background vocals on the single "Gotta Have Love", from Yolanda Adams's album More Than a Melody. He also appeared in the video. Terry has performed on the soundtracks to Gladiator starring Cuba Gooding, Jr., Tap starring Gregory Hines and King's Ransom starring Anthony Anderson. In 1991, Terry earned two Soul Train Music Award nominations: Single of the Year and Artist of the Year for "With You". His video for "With You" was executive produced by Anita Baker and directed by Blair Underwood, who made a cameo appearance.

Terry released a new project in 2015, I Tony 6, on Spectra's Monarchy Records.

=== Acting ===
Terry was featured in Sisterella, co-produced by Michael Jackson; Mama, I Want to Sing; David E. Talbert's His Woman, His Wife, co-starring Stephanie Mills; and the national tour of Tall Dark and Handsome. He also undertook The Wiz national tour as the Tin Man. Terry toured in the stage production Cheezecake Boyz and the Diva.

== Discography ==
=== Albums ===
| Album | Year | Peak chart positions | |
| Album | Year | US R&B | US 200 |
|---|---|---|---|
| Forever Yours | 1987 | 27 | 151 |
| Tony Terry | 1990 | 35 | 184 |
| Heart of a Man | 1994 | 47 | — |
| My Best | 2001 | — | — |
| Changed! | 2006 | 54 | — |
| I Tony 6 | 2015 | — | — |
"—" denotes releases that did not chart.

=== Singles ===
| Single | Year | Peak chart positions | | |
| Single | Year | US R&B | US Hot 100 | UK |
|---|---|---|---|---|
| "She's Fly" | 1987 | 10 | 80 | — |
| "Forever Yours" | 1988 | 16 | 80 | — |
| "Lovey Dovey" | 1988 | 4 | — | 44 |
| "Young Love" | 1988 | 88 | — | 94 |
| "On the Strength" (Flame with Tony Terry) | 1989 | 59 | — | — |
| "Head Over Heels" | 1990 | 13 | — | — |
| "With You" | 1991 | 6 | 14 | — |
| "That Kind of Guy" | 1991 | 38 | — | — |
| "Everlasting Love" | 1991 | 6 | 81 | — |
| "When a Man Cries" | 1994 | 32 | — | — |
| "Heart of a Man" | 1995 | 86 | — | — |
| "In the Shower" | 2001 | — | — | — |
| "If You're Gonna Worry, Don't Pray" | 2006 | — | — | — |
| "All I Need" | 2013 | — | — | — |
| "Repertoire" (James Day feat. Tony Terry) | 2015 | — | — | — |
| "Ready" (Razzadah feat. Tony Terry) | 2015 | — | — | — |
| "Lovaholic" | 2015 | — | — | — |
| "Dance for Hours" | 2015 | — | — | — |
| "Take Me" | 2018 | — | — | — |
| "A Change Is Gonna Come" | 2019 | — | — | — |
| "My Soul Has Been Anchored in the Lord" | 2020 | — | — | — |
| "Born Ta Luv Ya" | 2020 | — | — | — |
| "INSPIRED" | 2022 | — | — | — |
| "Hey Father (You're a Miracle)" | 2026 | — | — | — |
"—" denotes releases that did not chart.

=== Guest appearances ===
List of non-single guest appearances, with other performing artists, showing year released and album name
| Title | Year | Artist(s) | Album |
|---|---|---|---|
| "How Many Times" | 2019 | James Artissen | Blu Leisure |

== See also ==
- List of new jack swing artists
- List of 1990s one-hit wonders in the United States
- Hi-top fade
