= Heaven (BeBe & CeCe Winans album) =

Studio album by BeBe & CeCe Winans
- Released: September 1988
- Genres: Contemporary Gospel, contemporary Christian
- Length: 50:46
- Label: Sparrow/Capitol
- Producer: Keith Thomas

BeBe & CeCe Winans chronology
BeBe & CeCe Winans (1987)	Heaven (1988)	Different Lifestyles (1991)

Heaven is the third album released by brother and sister duo BeBe & CeCe Winans and their second released on Capitol Records. It reached number one on the Billboard Top Gospel Albums chart.

== Track listing ==
No.	Title	Writer(s)	Length
1.	"Heaven"	Keith Thomas, Benjamin Winans	4:42
2.	"Celebrate New Life"	Keith Thomas, Benjamin Winans	3:44
3.	"Lost Without You"	Keith Thomas, Benjamin Winans	4:12
4.	"You"	Mark Kibble, Michael Lawrence, Mervyn Warren, Benjamin Winans	4:43
5.	"Wanna Be More"	Benjamin Winans	4:40
6.	"Hold Up the Light" (featuring Whitney Houston)	Percy Bady, Benjamin Winans	4:52
7.	"Meantime"	Keith Thomas, Benjamin Winans	5:06
8.	"Don't Cry"	Keith Thomas, Benjamin Winans	4:21
9.	"Trust Him"	Keith Thomas, Benjamin Winans	4:30
10.	"Bridge Over Troubled Water"	Paul Simon	3:52
11.	"Heaven (Extended mix)"		6:06

== Personnel ==
Vocals

- BeBe Winans – lead vocals, backing vocals (1, 3, 4, 6, 7, 9)
- CeCe Winans – lead vocals, backing vocals (1–4, 6, 7, 9)
- Alvin Chea – bass vocals (1)
- Margaret Bell – backing vocals (2, 4, 9)
- Whitney Houston – backing vocals (2), guest vocals (6)
- Claude V. McKnight III – backing vocals (4)
- Meryvn Warren – backing vocals (4, 9)
- Angie Winans – backing vocals (6)
- Debbie Winans – backing vocals (6)
- Gino Speight – backing vocals (9)
- Hezekiah Walker and the Love Fellowship Crusade Choir – backing vocals (10)
- Backing vocals on all tracks arranged by BeBe Winans and Keith Thomas, except Track 9, arranged by Meryvn Warren.

Musicians

- Keith Thomas – arrangements, synthesizers (1–9), Synclavier (1–4, 10), bass (1–4, 6, 7, 9), acoustic piano (5, 8), guitar synthesizer (6), horn arrangements (6), programming (10)
- Brett Perry – Synclavier programming (1–10)
- Percy Bady – synthesizers (6), arrangements (6), horn arrangements (6)
- Paul Jackson Jr. – guitar (1, 3, 5, 7, 8, 9)
- Ira Siegel – guitar (2, 6)
- Tom Hemby – guitar (5)
- Jimmie Lee Sloas – bass (5)
- Gary Lunn – bass (8)
- Mark Hammond – additional drum programming (1), drum machine programming (2, 6, 9), additional programming (3)
- Paul Leim – drums (5, 7, 8)
- Terry McMillan – percussion (5, 7)
- Mark Douthit – saxophone (6)
- Sam Levine – saxophone (6)
- Gerald Albright – saxophone (9)
- Chris McDonald – trombone (6), horn arrangements (6)
- Mike Haynes – trumpet (6)
- George Tidwell – trumpet (6)
- Jeremy Lubbock – string arrangements (1–4, 6–10), conductor (1–10)
- Ronn Huff – string arrangements (5)
- The Nashville String Machine – strings (1–10)

== Production ==
- Producer – Keith Thomas
- Executive producers – Michael Brown and Wayne Edwards
- Production assistance – Todd Moore and Brett Perry
- Recorded and mixed by Jeff Balding
- Additional engineering – Billy Whittington
- Assistant recording – Steve Bishir, Chris Bubcaz, Craig Hansen, Shawn McLean, Todd Moore, Mark Nevers, Tom Singers, Carry Summers and Kevin Twit
- Mix assistant – Carry Summers
- Recorded at OmniSound Studios, Digital Recorders, Gold Mine Studio and Center Stage Studios (Nashville, TN); The Castle (Franklin, TN); The Hit Factory (New York, NY); Bunny Hop Studios (Los Angeles, CA).
- Mixed at OmniSound Studios and Digital Recorders.
- Mastered by Steve Hall at Future Disc (Hollywood, CA).
- Art direction – Tommy Steele
- Design – Stan Evenson Design, Inc.
- Photography – Victoria Pearson
- Management – David Sonenberg

== Charts ==
Chart (1988)	Peak position
U.S. Billboard Top Pop Albums	95
U.S. Billboard Top R&B Albums	10
U.S. Top Gospel Albums (Billboard)	1
U.S. Top Contemporary Christian Albums (Billboard)	3

Singles

Year	Title	US R&B
1988	"Heaven"	12
1989	"Lost Without You"	8
1989	"Celebrate New Life" (feat. Whitney Houston)	25
