= Lord Lift Us Up =

Studio album by BeBe & CeCe Winans
- Released: 1984
- Genres: R&B, Gospel
- Length: 44:05
- Label: PTL Records
- Producer: Bill Maxwell

BeBe & CeCe Winans chronology
Lord Lift Us Up (1984)	BeBe & CeCe Winans (1987)

Lord Lift Us Up is the debut album by brother and sister duo BeBe & CeCe Winans, recorded in 1984. It was released independently by PTL Ministries. The title track is a Christianized version of the song "Up Where We Belong" from the 1982 film An Officer and a Gentleman.

== Track listing ==
No.	Title	Writer(s)	Length
1.	"Worth the While"	Benjamin Winans	4:34
2.	"Nevertheless"	Derek Floyd, Marlene Floyd	5:45
3.	"Turn"	B. Winans	5:09
4.	"The Right Choice"	B. Winans	3:33
5.	"I'm Gonna Miss You (Cece's Wedding Song)"	B. Winans	4:07
6.	"I Really Love You"	B. Winans	4:16
7.	"Up Where We Belong"	Buffy Sainte-Marie, Jack Nitzsche, Will Jennings	4:57
8.	"He'll Be There"	B. Winans	4:25
9.	"The Giver of Life"	Marvin Winans	4:03
10.	"We Are Not Ashamed"	Andraé Crouch	4:33

== Personnel ==
- CeCe Winans – lead and backing vocals
- BeBe Winans – lead and backing vocals, keyboards, vocal arrangements
- Michael Ruff – keyboards
- Hadley Hockersmith – guitars
- Dean Parks – guitars
- Abraham Laboriel – bass
- Bill Maxwell – drums (1, 2, 3, 5-8, 10), percussion, vocal arrangements
- Alex Acuña – drums (4, 9), percussion
- Justo Almario – saxophones
- Andy Martin – trombone
- Scott Smith – trumpet, musical arrangements
- Charles Veal – string concertmaster
- Michael Morgan – backing vocals
- Ron Smith – backing vocals
- Daniel Winans – backing vocals, lead vocals (5)
- Marvin Winans – backing vocals, vocal arrangements
- Vickie Winans – backing vocals
- Marvie Wright – backing vocals

=== Production ===
- Bill Maxwell – producer
- Eric AuCoin – executive producer
- Christopher Banninger – engineer
- Win Kutz – engineer
- Bob Whyley – engineer
- Bernie Grundman – mastering
