= Tony Terry (album) =

1990 studio album by Tony Terry

Studio album by Tony Terry
- Released: November 20, 1990
- Recorded: 1990
- Genre: R&B
- Length: 55:56
- Label: Epic Records
- Producer: Ted Currier

Tony Terry chronology
Forever Yours (1987)	Tony Terry (1990)	Heart of a Man (1994)

Singles from Tony Terry
- 1. "Head over Heels" Released: October 31, 1990; 2. "With You" Released: March 4, 1991; 3. "That Kind of Guy" Released: June 20, 1991; 4. "Everlasting Love" Released: November 7, 1991

Professional ratings
Review scores
Source	Rating
Allmusic	3/5 stars

Tony Terry is the self-titled second album released in 1990, by Washington, D.C.–based R&B singer Tony Terry. The album's first single, "Head over Heels", charted on the R&B singles and peaked at No. 13. In 1991, singles "With You" and "Everlasting Love" each peaked on the same chart at No. 6.

== Track listing ==
1. "Head over Heels" – 5:41
2. "Bad Girl" – 5:11
3. "Baby Love" – 5:10
4. "Friends and Lovers" – 4:21
5. "With You" – 5:04
6. "Come Home With Me" – 5:58
7. "That Kind of Guy" – 4:56
8. "Tongue Tied" – 4:48
9. "Let Me Love You" – 5:01
10. "Read My Mind" – 4:25
11. "Everlasting Love" – 5:19

== Charts ==
Chart (1991)	Peak position
Billboard Pop Albums	184
Billboard Top Soul Albums	35

=== Singles ===
Year	Single	Chart positions	
Year	Single	US Pop	US Soul
1990	"Head over Heels"	—	13
1991	"With You"	14	6
1991	"That Kind of Guy"	—	38
1991	"Everlasting Love"	81	6
