= Addictive Love =

1991 single by BeBe & CeCe Winans

"Addictive Love" is a number-one R&B single by the gospel duo BeBe & CeCe Winans from their album Different Lifestyles. The song spent two weeks at number one on the US R&B chart. It ranked #364 on Songs of the Century.

== See also ==
- List of Hot R&B Singles number ones of 1991
