= Still (BeBe & CeCe Winans album) =

Studio album by BeBe & CeCe Winans
- Released: October 6, 2009
- Genre: R&B
- Length: 46:23
- Label: Malaco
- Producer: (various) Mervyn Warren

BeBe & CeCe Winans chronology
The Best of BeBe & CeCe Winans (2006)	Still (2009)

Still is the seventh and final album by the duo BeBe & CeCe Winans, and was released in October 2009 on Malaco Records. It rose to No. 2 on the Billboard Top R&B/Hip-Hop Albums chart and No. 12 on the Billboard 200 chart.

== Overview ==
Still won a Grammy Award for Best Contemporary R&B Gospel Album. The track "Grace" won in the category of Best Gospel Performance.

Professional ratings
Review scores
Source	Rating
Allmusic	4/5 stars
Billboard	4/5 stars

== Samples ==
"Reason to Dance" samples "Wanna Be Startin' Somethin'" by Michael Jackson. "Never Thought" contains a sample of Earth, Wind & Fire's "That's the Way of the World".

== Track listing ==
Adapted from album's text.

No.	Title	Writer(s)	Producer(s)	Length
1.	"Still" (music programmed & bass played by Keith Thomas) (electric guitar: Jonathan Crone)	BeBe Winans; arranged by Keith Thomas	Keith Thomas, Jonathan Crone (coordinator), Daryl Bush (coordinator)	4:02
2.	"Close to You" (music programmed by Keith Thomas) (electric guitar: Jonathan Crone)	BeBe Winans; arranged by Keith Thomas	Keith Thomas, Jonathan Crone (coordinator), Daryl Bush (coordinator)	3:24
3.	"Things" (featuring Marvin Winans) (music arranged by Peter Zizzo) (drum machine, keyboards & guitar: Peter Zizzo) (additional vocals: Marvin Winans)	BeBe Winans, Peter Zizzo	Peter Zizzo	3:18
4.	"Grace" (music programmed & piano played by Keith Thomas) (violin: Tracy Silverman) (acoustic guitar: Jonathan Crone) (percussion: Eric Darken) (choir director: Nathan Young) (choir vocals: Anthony Davis, Cindy Larson, Gene Smith, Olivia Mack, Sheldon Goodson & Sherrie Kibble) (guest & additional choir vocals: Nathan Young & Suzanne Young)	BeBe Winans; arranged by Keith Thomas	Keith Thomas, Jonathan Crone (coordinator), Daryl Bush (coordinator)	5:47
5.	"Reason to Dance" (background vocals: Priscilla Jones-Campbell & Nu Colours: Fay Simpson, Lawrence Johnson & Lain Gray) (horns: Dontae Winslow) (additional instruments: Warryn Campbell)	Warryn Campbell	Warryn Campbell	4:14
6.	"He Can Handle It" (lead vocals performed by BeBe & CeCe Winans) (drums & DJ chants performed by Tony "CD" Kelly) (percussion: Tony "CD" Kelly, & Lionel "Deadbeat" De La O) (virtual horns: Lionel "Deadbeat" De La O) (organ & keyboards: Leroy Romans) (bass: Zemroy Lewis) (lead & ska guitars: Wendel "Junior Jazz" Ferraro) (background vocals: Shaze)	BeBe Winans	Tony "CD" Kelly	4:41
7.	"Changed My World" (background vocals: Lisa Vaughn & Mervyn Warren) (keyboards & drum machine: Alex Teamer) (music programming & additional keyboards: Mervyn Warren) (guitar: Paul Jackson Jr.)	Alvin Love III; arranged by Alex Teamer & Mervyn Warren; orchestrated by Mervyn Warren	Mervyn Warren	4:08
8.	"The Garden" (vocals: BeBe & CeCe Winans) (vocals arranged by BeBe Winans)	Percy Bady, CeCe Winans	Percy Bady	4:20
9.	"Never Thought" (background vocals: Darwin Hobbs) (music arranged by Peter Zizzo) (drum machine, keyboards & guitar: Peter Zizzo)	Bebe Winans, Peter Zizzo	Peter Zizzo	4:59
10.	"I Found Love (Cindy's Song)" (lead vocals: BeBe Winans) (drum machine & percussion programming: Scott Frankfurt) (guitar: Paul Jackson Jr.)	Bebe Winans; arranged & orchestrated by Mervyn Warren	Mervyn Warren	3:58
11.	"Let It Be" (featuring Mary Mary) (additional vocals: Mary Mary) (instruments played by Mario Winans)	BeBe Winans, Mario Winans	Mario Winans	3:32

== Charts ==
=== Weekly charts ===
Chart (2009)	Peak position
US Billboard 200	12
US Top Gospel Albums (Billboard)	1
US Top R&B/Hip-Hop Albums (Billboard)	2
US Independent Albums (Billboard)	1

=== Year-end charts ===
Chart (2009)	Position
US Top Gospel Albums (Billboard)	4
US Top R&B/Hip-Hop Albums (Billboard)	73

Chart (2010)	Position
US Top Gospel Albums (Billboard)	3
US Top R&B/Hip-Hop Albums (Billboard)	42
