= Different Lifestyles =

Studio album by BeBe & CeCe Winans
- Released: June 24, 1991
- Recorded: 1990–1991
- Genre: Gospel
- Length: 57:11
- Labels: Capitol; 92078
- Producers: BeBe Winans, Keith Thomas, Rhett Lawrence

BeBe & CeCe Winans chronology
Heaven (1988)	Different Lifestyles (1991)	First Christmas (1993)

Singles from Different Lifestyles
- 1. "Addictive Love" Released: July 30, 1991; 2. "I'll Take You There" Released: September 5, 1991; 3. "It's OK" Released: January 21, 1992; 4. "Depend On You" Released: June 2, 1992; 5. "The Blood" Released: September 29, 1992

Professional ratings
Review scores
Source	Rating
Allmusic	3/5 stars

Different Lifestyles is the fourth album by brother and sister duo BeBe & CeCe Winans, released on June 24, 1991, by Capitol Records. The album included the singles "'Addictive Love" and a cover of The Staple Singers' "I'll Take You There", featuring Mavis Staples. Both singles topped the R&B charts. Rapper MC Hammer made an appearance on the single "The Blood" at the height of his career. It was one of the top ten albums featured on CCM Magazine's "CCM Presents: The 100 Greatest Albums in Christian Music."

Different Lifestyles won the Best Contemporary Soul Gospel Album award at the 1992 Grammy Awards. It was also certified Platinum by the Recording Industry Association of America (RIAA), and is one of the best-selling gospel albums of all time.

== Track listing ==
No.	Title	Writer(s)	Length
1.	"Depend on You"	Keith Thomas, Benjamin Winans, Debra Winans	4:23
2.	"Addictive Love"	Thomas, B. Winans, CeCe Winans	5:24
3.	"It's O.K."	Thomas, B. Winans	4:07
4.	"The Blood" (featuring MC Hammer)	Rhett Lawrence, Dean Pitchford, B. Winans	4:54
5.	"Two Different Lifestyles"	Cedric Caldwell, B. Winans	4:54
6.	"Supposed to Be"	Thomas, B. Winans	4:29
7.	"I'll Take You There" (featuring Mavis Staples)	Alvertis Isbell	4:19
8.	"You Know and I Know"	Caldwell, B. Winans	3:45
9.	"Searching for Love (It's Real)"	Angie Winans, B. Winans	5:32
10.	"Better Place"	B. Winans, C. Winans	4:10
11.	"Can't Take This Away"	Lawrence, B. Winans	4:46
12.	"Addictive Love (Extended Version)"		6:26

== Personnel ==
Vocals

- BeBe Winans – lead vocals, backing vocals (1, 2, 5, 8, 12), BGV arrangements (1, 5, 7, 9, 11, 12)
- CeCe Winans – lead vocals, backing vocals (1, 2, 4, 5, 10, 12), BGV arrangements (7)
- Donna McElroy – backing vocals (1, 2, 7, 12)
- Angie Winans – backing vocals (1, 2, 4, 10, 12)
- Debbie Winans – backing vocals (1, 2, 4, 7–10, 12)
- Joey Kibble – backing vocals (4)
- Carvin Winans – backing vocals (4)
- Marvin Winans – backing vocals (4)
- Michael Winans – backing vocals (4)
- Ronald Winans – backing vocals (4)
- Margaret Bell – backing vocals (4, 7, 10)
- Whitney Houston – backing vocals (4, 10)
- MC Hammer – rap (4)
- Mavis Staples – guest vocals (7)
- Mark Kibble – backing vocals (8, 9)
- Sherrie Kibble – backing vocals (8, 9)
- Mervyn Warren – backing vocals (8, 9)
- Suzan Brittan – backing vocals (9)
- Valerie Davis – backing vocals (9)
- Luther Vandross – backing vocals (9), BGV arrangements (9)
- Mount Calvary Baptist Church Choir (Palm Springs, California) – backing vocals (11)
- Keith Thomas – BGV arrangements (1, 7, 12)
- Rhett Lawrence – BGV arrangements (11)

Musicians

- Keith Thomas – synthesizers (1, 2, 3, 5, 6, 7, 12), bass (1, 2, 3, 5, 6, 7, 12), percussion (1, 12), arrangements (1, 2, 3, 5, 6, 7, 12), drum programming (2, 5, 6, 7), percussion programming (3), string arrangements (3)
- Rhett Lawrence – keyboards (4, 11), bass (4, 11), programming (4, 11), arrangements (4, 11)
- Logan Reynolds – organ (4, 11), synthesizers (8, 9, 10), arrangements (10)
- Howard McCrary – acoustic piano (9), arrangements (9)
- Keith Andes – additional keyboards (10), programming (10)
- Jerry McPherson – guitar (1, 3, 5, 6, 7, 12), electric guitar (2)
- Tom Hemby – acoustic guitar (2, 8)
- Paul Jackson, Jr. – guitar (4, 9, 10, 11)
- Mike Wright – guitar (8)
- Andrew Gouche – bass (8, 9)
- Ricky Lawson – drum programming (1, 12), drums (9)
- Mark Hammond – drum programming (2, 7, 8)
- Steve Brewster – drums (3)
- Joe Hogue – drum programming (10)
- Hen-Gee – scratches (4)
- Terry McMillan – harmonica (7)
- Mark Douthit – saxophone (8)
- Dan Higgins – saxophone (10, 11)
- Kim Hutchcroft – saxophone (11)
- Chris McDonald – trombone (7)
- Mike Haynes – trumpet (7)
- George Tidwell – trumpet (7)
- Jerry Hey – trumpet (10, 11), horn arrangements (10)
- Gary Grant – trumpet (11)
- Cedric Caldwell – arrangements (8)
- Jeff Lippencott – string arrangements and conductor (3)
- Johnny Mandel – string arrangements (3)
- Jeremy Lubbock – string arrangements (8, 9)
- Carl Gorodetzky – contractor (3)
- John Coleman – conductor (8, 9)
- The Nashville String Machine – strings (3)
- National Philharmonic Orchestra – strings (8, 9)

== Production ==
- Keith Thomas – producer (1, 2, 3, 5, 6, 7, 12), additional producer (8)
- Rhett Lawrence – producer (4, 11), engineer (4, 11), additional producer (9)
- BeBe Winans – producer (8, 9, 10), co-producer (11), executive producer
- Keith Cohen – additional producer (10), mixing (4, 10, 11)
- Scott Folks – executive producer
- Todd Moore – production coordinator, assistant engineer (1, 2, 3, 5, 6, 7)
- Skip Barrett – production coordinator, album coordinator
- Louis Upkins, Jr. – production coordinator, album coordinator
- Bill Whittington – recording (1, 2, 3, 5, 6, 7, 12), mixing (1, 2, 3, 5, 6, 7, 12), additional engineer (9, 10)
- Jeff Balding – engineer (4, 8–11)
- Ronnie Brookshire – engineer (4, 11)
- Sylvia Massy – engineer (4), mix assistant (4)
- Paul McKenna – engineer (4, 11), mixing (11)
- Craig Burbidge – mixing (9)
- Karen Segal – engineer (11)
- John Potoker – recording (12)
- Leslie Ann Jones – additional engineer (9)
- Andrew Kautz – additional engineer (12)
- Todd Chapman – assistant engineer (1)
- Todd Culross – assistant engineer (1, 2, 3, 5, 7)
- Patrick Kelly – assistant engineer (1, 2, 6, 8, 9, 10)
- David Latto – assistant engineer (1, 2, 3, 5, 7)
- John David Parker – assistant engineer (1, 3, 5, 8, 12)
- Kelly Pribble – assistant engineer (1, 2, 3, 5, 7)
- Carry Summers – assistant engineer (1, 2, 6, 8, 9, 10)
- Shane D. Wilson – assistant engineer (1, 2, 3, 5, 6)
- Greg Parker – assistant engineer (2, 6, 10)
- David Hall – assistant engineer (7)
- Thom Russo – assistant engineer (7, 10)
- Steve Hall – mastering
- Christine Beaudet – album coordinator
- Tommy Steele – art direction
- Stan Evenson – design
- Glenn Sakamoto – design
- David Roth – photography

Studios

- Recorded at The Bennett House (Franklin, TN); Emerald Sound Studios, Sixteenth Avenue Sound, MasterMix, OmniSound Studios, Hummingbird Sound and Javelina Recording Studios (Nashville, TN); Alpha International Studios (Philadelphia, PA); Quad Recording Studios (New York, NY); Ocean Way Recording, Cherokee Studios, Capitol Studios and The Bunny Hop (Hollywood, CA); Larrabee Sound Studios (North Hollywood, CA); Oakshire Recorders and Summa Studios (Los Angeles, CA); Aire L.A. Studios (Glendale, CA); Can-Am Recorders (Tarzana, CA); Angel Studios (London, UK).
- Mastered at Future Disc (North Hollywood, CA).

== Charts ==
Chart (1991)	Peak position
U.S. Billboard Top Pop Albums	74
U.S. Billboard Top R&B Albums	1
U.S. Top Gospel Albums (Billboard)	1
U.S. Top Contemporary Christian Albums (Billboard)	3

Singles

Year	Title	US R&B
1991	"Addictive Love"	1
1991	"I'll Take You There" (featuring Mavis Staples)	1
1992	"It's O.K."	6
1992	"Depend On You"	24

== See also ==
- List of number-one R&B albums of 1991 (U.S.)
