= BeBe & CeCe Winans =

American gospel music duo

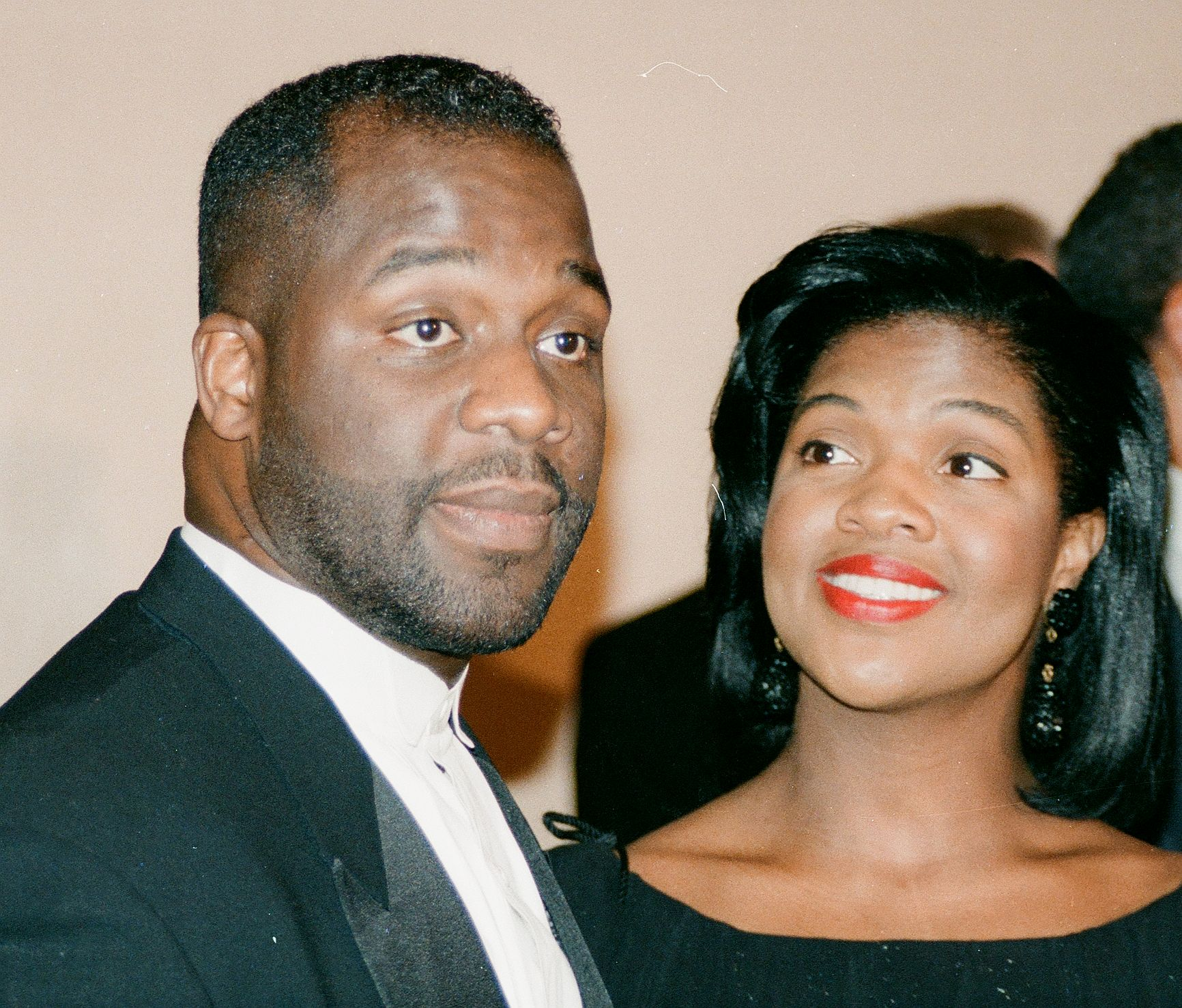
- BeBe (left) and CeCe Winans (right) in 1994

Background information
- Origin: Detroit, Michigan, U.S.
- Genres: Contemporary gospel, contemporary Christian music, R&B
- Occupation: Singers
- Instrument: Vocals
- Years active: 1981–1996, 2009 (reunion)
- Labels: Sparrow, Capitol, EMI
- Spinoff of: The Winans, Winans family
- Members: Benjamin "BeBe" Winans; Priscilla "CeCe" Winans-Love

BeBe & CeCe Winans are an American gospel/R&B music brother and sister duo. BeBe and CeCe Winans are the seventh and eighth of the Winans family's ten children, most of whom have had gospel music careers. Together, they have received several awards, including three Grammys.

== Music career ==
While BeBe and CeCe were in high school, four of their elder brothers formed the successful gospel group The Winans. Initially known as The Winans Part II, BeBe and CeCe first appeared in the public eye when they debuted in 1982 as part of the singing group The PTL Singers on the Christian television show The PTL Club. They were introduced by Jim Bakker, and recorded their first album Lord Lift Us Up as a duo for PTL Records.

=== Self-titled debut ===
BeBe and CeCe left the PTL Singers in 1987 to pursue a musical career and that same year, Sparrow Records offered the two siblings a Gospel recording contract. Their mainstream debut release was the self-titled album BeBe & CeCe Winans. It was produced by Keith Thomas, who would go on to produce Amy Grant and Vanessa L. Williams. The debut record gave them their first R&B hit, "I.O.U. Me", which topped R&B and inspirational charts and generated Grammy nominations, and Dove and Stellar Awards. CeCe also earned a Grammy for "Best Soul Gospel Performance, Female" for the song "For Always."

They were one of the first African-American artists to receive significant airplay on contemporary Christian music radio stations and the second African-American artists to receive the Dove Award in the Group of the Year category.

=== Heaven ===
With the release of their second LP Heaven, they remained steadily popular with R&B audiences, spawning 3 R&B hit singles including two No. 1 singles. The pair became the first Gospel artists to see their album reach No. 1 on the Billboard sales charts in 1988. The title track also reached No. 12 on the Billboard R&B singles chart.

Other hits from the album included "Lost Without You" and "Celebrate New Life," one of two album tracks featuring superstar and family friend Whitney Houston.

The album reached the R&B Top Ten, went to No. 95 on the Pop Charts and was certified Gold.

=== Different Lifestyles ===
The release of their 1991 album Different Lifestyles brought their biggest success to date. It featured the singles "Addictive Love" and a cover of The Staple Singers' "I'll Take You There" featuring Mavis Staples. Both singles topped the R&B chart. Rapper MC Hammer was featured on the single "The Blood" at the height of his career. In 1992, the song peaked at No. 8 on Billboard's Christian Adult Contemporary chart.

=== First Christmas ===
A holiday release titled First Christmas followed in 1993. This album showcased BeBe's production skills and led to him doing production work with Whitney Houston on the soundtrack for the movie The Bodyguard as well as production and writing music for artists such as Gladys Knight, Bobby Brown, The Clark Sisters and his younger sisters Angie and Debbie Winans.

=== Relationships ===
1994 saw the release of their studio album Relationships, featuring the notable singles "If Anything Ever Happened To You," "Love of My Life," and "Stay With Me." This album conveyed a more personal approach, in CeCe's words: "A lot of people think we're supposed to be perfect, but we're people too, we go through hurt [and] pain. We get songs through experiences and as we reveal these things, people are touched."

=== Still ===
In 2009, Still was BeBe & CeCe's first album in more than 15 years. Premiering 12 new songs, the album's lead single was "Close to You". The album won two Grammy Awards: Best Gospel Performance (the song "Grace") and Best Gospel R&B Album.

== Awards and honors ==
As a duo, BeBe and CeCe Winans' accolades include three Grammy Awards, nine Dove Awards, two NAACP Image awards, two Soul Train Music Awards, numerous Stellar Awards, three Gold albums, and one Platinum album.

=== Grammy Awards ===
- 1991: Best Contemporary Soul Gospel Album – Different Lifestyles
- 2010: Best Gospel Performance – "Grace"
- 2010: Best Contemporary R&B Gospel Album – Still

=== GMA Dove Awards ===
- 1988: New Artist of the Year
- 1990: Group of the Year
- 1990: Pop/Contemporary Album – Heaven
- 1990: Pop/Contemporary Song – "Heaven"
- 1990: Contemporary Gospel Song – "With My Whole Heart"
- 1992: Group of the Year
- 1992: Contemporary Gospel Song – "Addictive Love"
- 1998: Contemporary Gospel Song – "Up Where We Belong"
- 2010: Urban Recorded Song – "Close to You"

=== NAACP Image Awards ===
- 1990: Best Gospel Artist
- 1992: Best Gospel Artist

=== Soul Train Music Awards ===
- 1990: Best Gospel Album – Heaven
- 1992: Best Gospel Album – Different Lifestyles

The Walk of Fame Committee of the Hollywood Chamber of Commerce has announced that BeBe & CeCe Winans names will be added to the Hollywood Walk of Fame in 2011. The duo were inducted into the Black Music & Entertainment Walk of Fame in 2022.

== Discography ==
=== Albums ===
==== Studio albums ====
Year	Album	Peak positions			Label
Year	Album	US Gospel	US R&B	US Pop	Label
1984	Lord Lift Us Up	20	—	—	PTL
1987	BeBe & CeCe Winans	12	49	—	Sparrow/Capitol
1988	Heaven	1	10	95	Sparrow/Capitol
1991	Different Lifestyles	1	1	74	Sparrow/Capitol
1993	First Christmas	23	17	163	Sparrow/Capitol
1994	Relationships	4	19	111	Sparrow/Capitol
2009	Still	1	2	12	B&C/Malaco

==== Compilation albums ====
Year	Album	Peak positions			Label
Year	Album	US Gospel	US R&B	US Pop	Label
1996	Greatest Hits	3	93	—	Sparrow
2006	The Best of BeBe & CeCe Winans	—	—	—	Sparrow

=== Singles ===
Year	Song	Peak positions				Album
Year	Song	US Hot 100	US Christian	US Gospel	US R&B	Album
1984	"Up Where We Belong"	—	27	—	—	Lord Lift Us Up
1987	"I.O.U. Me"	—	2	—	77	BeBe & CeCe Winans
1987	"Love Said Not So"	—	11	—	—	BeBe & CeCe Winans
1988	"Change Your Nature"	—	8	—	—	BeBe & CeCe Winans
1989	"Heaven"	—	3	—	12	Heaven
1989	"Celebrate New Life" (feat. Whitney Houston)	—	4	—	25	Heaven
1989	"Lost Without You"	—	1	—	8	Heaven
1990	"Meantime"	—	15	—	—	Heaven
1990	"You"	—	24	—	—	Heaven
1991	"Addictive Love"	—	1	—	1	Different Lifestyles
1991	"I'll Take You There" (feat. Mavis Staples)	90	1	—	1	Different Lifestyles
1991	"It's O.K."	—	7	—	6	Different Lifestyles
1992	"The Blood" (feat. MC Hammer)	—	8	—	78	Different Lifestyles
1992	"Depend on You"	—	2	—	24	Different Lifestyles
1993	"Can't Take This Away"	—	13	—	—	Different Lifestyles
1993	"Jingle Bells"	—	—	—	—	First Christmas
1994	"If Anything Ever Happened to You"	—	16	—	52	Relationships
1994	"Love of My Life"	—	—	—	35	Relationships
1995	"Count It All Joy"	—	7	—	—	Relationships
1995	"Stay with Me"	—	—	—	62	Relationships
2009	"Close to You"	—	—	1	21	Still
2009	"Grace"	—	—	5	—	Still
2010	"Found Love (Cindy's Song)"	—	—	11	—	Still

=== Music videos ===
- "Heaven"
- "Celebrate New Life"
- "Addictive Love"
- "I'll Take You There"
- "It's O.K."
- "Jingle Bells"
- "If Anything Ever Happened To You"
- "Love of My Life"
- "Feels Like Heaven (With You)"
- "Close To You" (Gospel No. 1, #38 R&B)

== Solo careers ==
In 1995, they officially parted ways to work on their solo careers and other areas of interest. Both artists have gone on to have successful solo careers, receiving numerous awards and accolades. To date, BeBe has released six solo albums, while CeCe has released twelve.

BeBe and CeCe Winans recorded twice as a duo during their hiatus (before reuniting for the 2009 album Still) – "What A Child", a duet on CeCe's Christmas album His Gift, released in 1998, and "Tonight Tonight", a duet on BeBe's 2000 album Love & Freedom.
