= Pop Winans =

American gospel music singer (1934–2009)

- Born: David Glenn; April 20, 1934; Detroit, Michigan, U.S.
- Died: April 8, 2009 (aged 74) Nashville, Tennessee, U.S.
- Genres: Christian, gospel
- Occupation: Singer
- Instrument: Vocals
- Years active: 1980s–2008
- Formerly of: The Winans, Winans family

David Glenn Winans Sr. (April 20, 1934 – April 8, 2009), better known to the general public as "Pop" Winans, was an American gospel music singer and band manager. Winans was best known as the manager of the gospel group The Winans during its early years in the 1980s and as the patriarch of the Winans family.

Pop Winans also had a solo career in music, releasing a CD of gospel music with his wife Delores "Mom" Winans called Mom & Pop Winans in 1989. The CD was nominated for a Grammy Award. Winans himself received a gospel nomination for best traditional gospel album for his solo album Uncensored in 2000.

== Early life ==
=== Childhood ===
Winans was born David Glenn on April 20, 1934, in Detroit. His parents never married and he was raised by his mother, Laura Glenn, a singer with the Zion Congregational Church of God in Christ. However, Winans was brought up in Detroit's Mack Avenue Church of God in Christ, of which his paternal grandfather, Isaiah Winans, was the pastor. His father, Carvin Winans (April 16, 1902 – February 1, 1992), denied paternity of David. When he grew up, David changed his surname from Glenn to Winans at the request of his grandfather.

=== Early singing career and The Nobelaires ===
At the age of 18, Winans began singing with The Nobelaires, a soul group in Detroit. Winans played the saxophone and the clarinet and joined the Lucille Lemon Gospel Chorus in 1950. However, after his children were born, Winans put aside his singing career and would not sing professionally again for the next 30 years.

=== Delores Ransom Winans ===
Delores Ransom Winans was born on September 22, 1936, in Detroit. Her father was a baker and her mother was a homemaker. She has one sister. As a youth, Delores learned how to play the piano and as an adolescent began piano playing for the Lucille Lemon Gospel Chorus. Ransom was the chorus' pianist for ten years. In 1950, Ransom and Winans met for the first time. The two soon began to date and were married at Zion Congregational COGIC on November 21, 1953.

The couple's eldest child, David Winans Jr., now an engineer, was born on September 24, 1954. Six more sons; Ronald, Carvin II, Marvin (fraternal twins), Michael, Daniel and Benjamin "BeBe", were born before the Winans' first daughter Priscilla Marie (CeCe Winans) was born on October 8, 1964. Two more daughters; Angelique "Angie" (born 1968) and Debbie (born 1972), were born to David and Delores completing the set of ten children born to the couple.

Over the next few years, Winans worked various dead end jobs to financially support his family. Those jobs included work as a car salesman, taxi driver, barber and janitor. Winans even had a job working for the main assembly plant of the Dodge Automobile Company in Detroit during the 1960s.

=== Preaching career ===
Pop Winans began to preach in Detroit churches in 1969. Reportedly, Winans first got the call to preach in 1964, but ignored it and waited a few years. Winans preached his first sermon at the Detroit Pentecostal Church of Hope where family friend Bishop Ramey was the preacher. Ramey was saved by Winans great-uncle Fred Winans in Mississippi. His first sermon was from the book of Isaiah chapter 55.

== Career ==
=== The Winans ===
Sons Ronald, Carvin II, Marvin, and Michael began singing at young ages in church. In the early 1980s, the boys were discovered by gospel legend Andraé Crouch. Soon after, the boys, performing under the name "The Winans", were signed to Light Records. Pop Winans soon became involved with the group becoming the boys' personal manager.

Their first record, Introducing The Winans was produced in 1981. They performed vocals in This Is America, Charlie Brown's segment "The Building of the Transcontinental Railroad" in 1989. Their style was noted for its crossover efforts and received airplay on R&B radio. The group's last recording was in 1995, but they have subsequently been involved in various Winans family projects where they are credited as "The Winans" (e.g. November 2000's Christmas: Our Gifts To You which Winans sang on).

Son Benjamin and daughter Priscilla began singing together around the same time The Winans released their first album. The two became known as BeBe & CeCe and also began singing and releasing hit albums. Some of their hit singles include Addictive Love and I'll Take You There.

=== Solo career ===
Winans and his wife Delores, who became known to the general public as "Mom" Winans, began singing professionally in the late 1980s. Their debut album, Mom & Pop Winans, was released by Sparrow Records in 1989. The album earned a Grammy nomination in the Best Traditional Soul Gospel album category. Their second album, The Rest of My Life, appeared in 1991. The latter set includes a rendition of the classic hymn "Go Tell It on the Mountain". Pop wrote his first two songs on it, "You've Got To Surrender" and "Who Shall Abide". Winans only solo album, Uncensored (Against The Flow), was released in 1999. The album features a combination of classics such as "This Train" and new compositions such as "Is There Any Hope?" and Holdin' On (Let Go and Let God)". Uncensored received a Grammy nomination for best traditional gospel album in 2000.

== Personal life ==
=== Philanthropy ===
In 1968, Winans founded a youth organization in Detroit. The goal of the organization was to help the children of Detroit with whatever problems they were facing whether domestic, financial, educational or etc. The organization served around 300 kids and involved ten little league baseball teams, a track team, arts and crafts.

In their later years, Mom and Pop Winans made appearances on many Christian programs and were frequent contributors to the Trinity Broadcasting Network and the Christian Broadcasting Network. Mom and Pop also frequently appeared at Benny Hinn crusades during the 1990s and 2000s and were regular guest on TBN's Praise the Lord television program.

=== Family ===
David married Delores at Zion Congregational Church of God in Christ in Detroit on November 21, 1953. The couple had ten children;

- David Winans Jr. (b. September 24, 1954)
- Ronald Winans (June 30, 1956 – June 17, 2005)
- Carvin Winans II (b. March 5, 1958)
- Marvin Lawrence Winans (b. March 5, 1958)
- Michael Winans (b. June 5, 1959)
- Daniel Winans Sr. (b. July 11, 1961)
- Benjamin "BeBe" Winans (b. September 17, 1962)
- Priscilla Marie 'CeCe' Winans Love (b. October 8, 1964)
- Angelique "Angie" Winans-Caldwell (b. March 4, 1968)
- Debra Renee "Debbie" Winans-Lowe (b. September 3, 1972)

Winans eldest son, David Jr., is an engineer and the only one of the Winans children not to enter the music business. Sons Ronald, Carvin II, Marvin and Michael were discovered by Andraé Crouch and were signed onto Light Records in 1981 under the name "The Winans". The Winans released several hit albums and appeared in Michael Jackson's "Man in the Mirror" before disbanding in 1995. The Winans have, however, reunited several times since their initial disbandment in 1995. Shortly after the band's disband, Ronald Winans began feeling ill. On January 31, 1997, Winans was admitted to the University of Michigan Hospital at Ann Arbor after suffering a massive heart attack due to an aortic tear. Ronald Winans was expected to die but after hours of surgery and reported lots of prayer from family members, Winans made a full recovery. Winans died of heart failure on June 17, 2005, at the age of 48.

Benjamin and Priscilla were asked to sing for a Christian television program in 1982 and soon by 1984, the siblings became known as BeBe & CeCe. Over the next several years, BeBe & CeCe released several hit albums. In 1991, their Different Lifestyles went platinum and became the first album in record history to top the US gospel and pop charts. BeBe and CeCe were jointly honored with a star on the Hollywood Walk of Fame for their contributions to the music industry on October 20, 2011.

Youngest daughters Angelique and Debra also became performers and formed the group "Angie & Debbie" in the early 1990s. Son Daniel won a Grammy for his 1989 hit "Brotherly Love". Some of Pop Winans' grandsons have also gone into music, forming "Winans Phase II", a continuation of "The Winans" in 1998. The group consists of members Marvin Winans Jr., Carvin Winans Jr., Michael Winans Jr., and Juan Winans (son of Carvin Sr.). Winans' grandson Marvin Jr. started a production company called M2 Entertainment and produced songs for his mother Vickie Winans' album Woman To Woman. He also released a solo album entitled Image of a Man.

Winans' grandson Michael Winans Jr. was convicted of fraud in connection with an $8,000,000 Ponzi scheme conducted by Winans Jr. Winans Jr. and others involved, including several pastors, told their victims, some in church, that they were selling Saudi Arabian oil bonds promising 100 percent returns of his investors' money within two months. Around 1,000 individuals and companies invested in the scam and most of the money went to personal expenses or to pay off past investors. As of 2013, nearly 600 investors were still owed amounts totaling nearly $4.7 million. Winans Jr. was convicted in February 2013 and sentenced to nearly 14 years in prison.

== Illness and death ==
Winans suffered a series of debilitating strokes and a massive heart attack in October 2008. In January 2009, Winans was moved from Detroit to the Alive Hospice in Nashville, Tennessee, to be closer to some of his children. Winans' health worsened over the next few months and on Wednesday, April 8, 2009, at around 4 pm CST, he died. Winans was 74. Winans was survived by Delores Ransom, his wife of 55 years, nine children, 23 grandchildren and several great-grandchildren.

Two memorial services were held for Winans at the Perfecting Church where Marvin Winans is senior pastor in Detroit. The viewing service took place on Tuesday, April 14, and the homegoing service took place on Wednesday, April 15. His funeral became standing room only as guests piled in the church. Several celebrities and prominent figures in gospel music attended Winans' funeral. Guests included the Williams Brothers, Tramaine Hawkins, Donnie McClurkin, Whitney Houston and Karen Clark Sheard. The Rev. Jesse Jackson delivered the eulogy.

Winans was buried in Woodlawn Cemetery in Detroit.
