= Decisions (The Winans album) =

Studio album by the Winans
- Released: August 1987
- Recorded: 1986–1987
- Studio: Selah Studios (Los Alamitos, California); Yamaha Studios (Glendale, California); Sound City Studios (Los Angeles, California); Weddington Studios (North Hollywood, California); Avalanche Studios (Denver, Colorado)
- Genre: Urban contemporary gospel, contemporary R&B
- Length: 41:56
- Label: Qwest, Warner Bros.
- Producer: Marvin Winans; Carvin Winans; Ronald Winans; Barry Hankerson

The Winans chronology
| Let My People Go (1985) | Decisions (1987) | Live at Carnegie Hall (1988) |

Professional ratings
Review scores
| Source | Rating |
|---|---|
| AllMusic | 3/5 stars |

Decisions is the fifth studio album by American gospel group the Winans, released in 1987 under Qwest Records. The album was written and produced by Marvin Winans, along with music producer Quincy Jones and Barry Hankerson. The album is a blend of contemporary gospel and R&B, also includes the Grammy winning single "Ain't No Need to Worry" featuring singer Anita Baker and "Love Has No Color" featuring singer-songwriter Michael McDonald. The album peaked at No. 1 on Billboard's Top Gospel Albums chart.

== Track listing ==
| No. | Title | Writer(s) | Length |
|---|---|---|---|
| 1. | "Ain't No Need to Worry" (feat. Anita Baker) | Marvin Winans | 5:46 |
| 2. | "Millions" | Marvin Winans | 4:24 |
| 3. | "Breaking of Day" | Marvin Winans | 4:48 |
| 4. | "What Can I Say?" | Marvin Winans | 4:44 |
| 5. | "Right, Left in a Wrong World" | Carvin Winans, Marvin Winans | 6:09 |
| 6. | "Don't Let The Sun Go Down On Me" | Elton John, Bernie Taupin; Arranged by Ronald Winans | 4:30 |
| 7. | "Love Has No Color" (feat. Michael McDonald) | Percy Bady, Marvin Winans, Ronald Winans | 4:14 |
| 8. | "Give Me You" | Marvin Winans | 4:45 |
| 9. | "How Can You Live Without Christ?" | Carvin Winans, Marvin Winans | 4:23 |

== Re-issue ==
| No. | Title | Length |
|---|---|---|
| 1. | "Ain't No Need to Worry" (feat. Anita Baker) | 5:46 |
| 2. | "Millions" | 4:24 |
| 3. | "Breaking of Day" | 4:48 |
| 4. | "What Can I Say?" (feat. Michael McDonald) | 4:44 |
| 5. | "Right, Left in a Wrong World" | 6:09 |
| 6. | "The Real Meaning of Christmas" | 4:40 |
| 7. | "Love Has No Color" (feat. Michael McDonald) | 4:14 |
| 8. | "Give Me You" | 4:45 |
| 9. | "How Can You Live Without Christ?" | 4:23 |

== Personnel ==
The Winans

- Carvin Winans – vocals
- Marvin Winans – vocals, percussion
- Michael Winans – vocals
- Ronald Winans – vocals

Musicians

- Laythan Armour – keyboards, synthesizer programming, drum programming
- John Bokowski – keyboards
- Loris Holland – keyboards
- Wayne Linsey – keyboards
- Greg Phillinganes – synthesizer programming
- Michael Rochelle – keyboards, synthesizers
- Harlan Rogers – keyboards
- Thomas Whitfield – keyboards
- Hadley Hockensmith – guitars
- Dean Parks – guitars
- Lanar Brantley – bass
- Dean Gant – bass
- Andrew Gouche – bass
- Abraham Laboriel – bass
- Bill Maxwell – drums
- Ollie E. Brown – LinnDrum, percussion
- Alex Acuña – percussion
- Barry Hankerson – percussion
- Justo Almario – horns
- Anita Baker – lead vocals (1)
- Douglas Williams – additional vocals (1)
- Melvin Williams – additional vocals (1)
- Michael McDonald – lead vocals (7)

Additional backing vocals

- Victor Adams, Fred Hammond, Kevin Anthony Jackson, Celeste McKinney, Kevin Session, Dwayne Whitfield, Angie Winans, BeBe Winans, Debbie Winans, Debra Winans, Regina Winans and Earl J. Wright

Children's choir on "Breaking of Day"

- Carvin Winans Jr., Deborah Joy Winans, Juan Winans, Mario Winans, Marvin Winans Jr., Mike Winans and Shay Winans

== Production ==
- Barry Hankerson – executive producer, co-producer, management
- Quincy Jones – executive producer
- Benny Medina – executive producer
- Marvin Winans – producer
- Carvin Winans – co-producer
- Ronald Winans – co-producer
- Craig Burbidge – engineer
- Peter Haden – engineer
- Allen Isaacs – engineer
- Steve King – engineer
- Win Kutz – engineer
- Barney Perkins – engineer
- Karen Jones – project coordinator
- Mary Ann Dibs – art direction, collage
- Russell Comfort – photography

== Awards ==
- 1988 Soul Train Music Awards - Best Gospel Album Group or Choir

== Charts ==
| Chart (1987) | Peak position |
|---|---|
| US Billboard 200 | 109 |
| US Top R&B Albums (Billboard) | 30 |
| US Top Gospel Albums (Billboard) | 1 |
