= New Hope Baptist Church =

New Hope Baptist Church may refer to:

- New Hope Baptist Church (Newark), a Baptist church in Newark, New Jersey
- New Hope Baptist Church (Beatrice, Alabama), listed on the National Register of Historic Places in Monroe County, Alabama
- New Hope Baptist Church, Romulus, Alabama, located in Tuscaloosa County, Alabama
- New Hope Baptist Church, Boston, Massachusetts, housed in the former Tremont Street Methodist Episcopal Church building
- New Hope Baptist Church (Chickasha, Oklahoma), listed on the National Register of Historic Places in Grady County, Oklahoma
- New Hope Baptist Church (Denver, Colorado), a church located at 3701 Colorado Boulevard in Denver, Colorado
