= Hazard Duty Pay! =

2022 song by JPEGMafia

Single by JPEGMafia

from the album LP!
- Released: February 24, 2022
- Genre: Hardcore hip-hop
- Length: 2:37
- Songwriter: Barrington Hendricks
- Producer: JPEGMafia

JPEGMafia singles chronology
"Trust!" (2021)	"Hazard Duty Pay!" (2022)	"Dirt" (2022)

"Hazard Duty Pay!" is a song by American rapper JPEGMafia from his fourth studio album, LP! (2021). The song was first released on YouTube alongside a music video on October 1, 2021, but was not officially released due to sample clearance issues. It was included on the "offline" version of LP!, released on October 22, 2021. On February 24, 2022, the song was released to streaming services as a part of JPEGMafia's Offline! extended play, which featured the unreleased tracks from the "offline" version of LP!. "Hazard Duty Pay!" was released as the only single from Offline! on the same day.

"Hazard Duty Pay!" was released to critical acclaim, with some naming it as the best song from LP!, as well as one of JPEGMafia's best songs.

== Background and release ==
Following his 2019 album All My Heroes Are Cornballs, JPEGMafia set out to create a "swan song" for his final release with EQT and Republic Records. Described as similar to American R&B artist Frank Ocean's 2016 releases of Endless and Blonde, this album, titled LP!, would be a double album. It would contain an "online" version, released to streaming services, with an "offline" version released to YouTube and Bandcamp. The "offline" version would feature songs with uncleared samples. On October 1, the song was released on YouTube alongside a music video. The song was released with the "offline" version of LP! on YouTube and Bandcamp, before releasing on streaming services on February 24, 2022.

== Composition ==
"Hazard Duty Pay!"
A 24-second sample of "Hazard Duty Pay!" that partially features the first verse of the track, highlighting the chopping of "Ain't No Need to Worry" by Anita Baker and The Winans alongside JPEGMafia's energetic vocal delivery and his production.

"Hazard Duty Pay!" features a prominent sample of the gospel song "Ain't No Need to Worry" by Anita Baker and The Winans. The sample is chopped up, with additional drums and bass lines added. The song's instrumental contrasts with JPEGMafia's abrasive vocal delivery, which lyrically consists of call-outs towards the music industry, lamenting the "fakeness" of the business. He emphasizes the importance of staying authentic and criticizes music labels for exploiting artists' experiences for personal gain.

== Music video ==
The music video for "Hazard Duty Pay!" was released on October 1, 2021. Directed by Anthony Sylvester, the video makes extensive use of lo-fi aesthetics and fisheye lens shots. JPEGMafia spends much of the video "flailing and dancing". The handheld video camera styled footage is consistent with many of JPEGMafia's other music videos.

== Reception ==
"Hazard Duty Pay!" received acclaim from critics, who praised the song's production and sample usage, as well as JPEGMafia's performance. In a review for Flood Magazine, Margaret Farrell praised the song's gospel sample vocal chops and "woozy bass melody". She also praised JPEGMafia's creative energy, and laments its exclusion from streaming services, stating that it was a "shame because it’s really fucking good." Writing for Pitchfork, Dylan Green called "Hazard Duty Pay!" one of the best moments of JPEGMafia's career. Jay Fullarton of Pit London described the track as "very unique" and "one of his most remarkable yet", feeling that the song would be "incredible to hear in a live setting".
