= Vickie Winans discography =

List of works by American singer

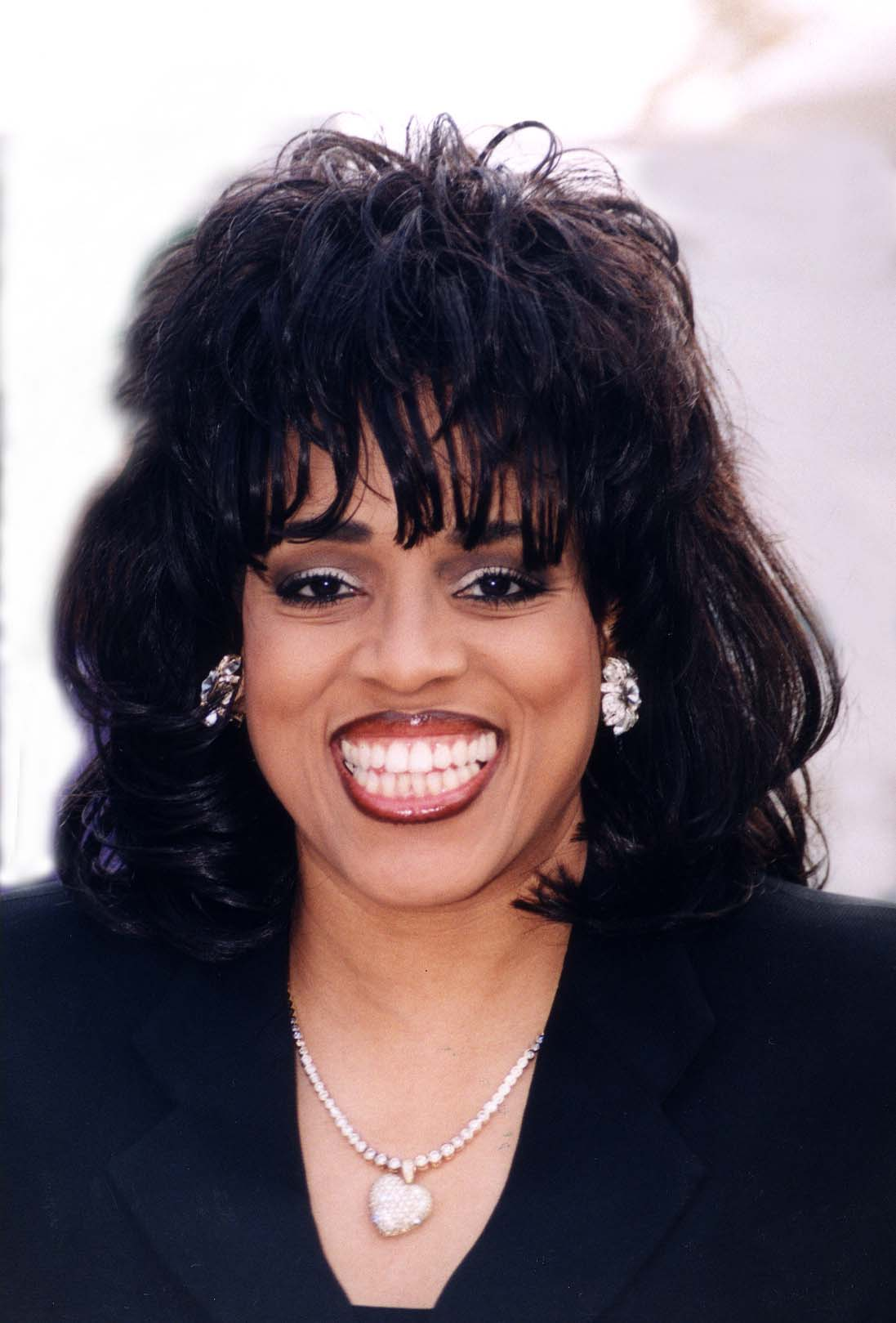
- Studio albums: 8
- Live albums: 3
- Compilation albums: 3

American singer Vickie Winans has released eight studio albums, three compilation albums, three live albums, and thirteen singles. Her debut album Be Encouraged was released on Light Records in 1987. Be Encouraged spent over thirteen weeks on Billboard's Top Spiritual Albums chart. She released her follow-up album Total Victory in 1989 before departing from Light Records. She released her third studio album The Lady (1991) on MCA Records and later released her fourth album Vickie Winans (1994) on Intersound Records. She released two live albums: Live in Detroit (1997) and Live in Detroit II (1999); the latter of which sold over 112,000 copies within the first month of its release.

She released her fifth studio album Bringing It All Together in 2003, which spent nine weeks at number one on Billboard's Top Gospel Albums chart. Her sixth album Woman to Woman: Songs of Life (2006) also peaked at number one on the Top Gospel Albums chart. The album's lead single "It's Alright" peaked at number two on the Hot Gospel Songs chart.

== Albums ==
=== Studio albums ===
Title	Album details	Peak chart positions			
Title	Album details	US	US Gospel	US Christian	US R&B
Be Encouraged	Released: July 31, 1987; Label: Light; Formats: CD, cassette	—	3	—	—
Total Victory	Released: 1989; Label: Light; Formats: CD, cassette	—	7	—	—
The Lady	Released: 1991; Label: MCA; Formats: CD, cassette	—	—	—	—
Vickie Winans	Released: August 16, 1994; Label: Intersound; Formats: CD, cassette	—	10	—	—
Bringing It All Together	Released: May 6, 2003; Label: Verity; Formats: CD	—	1	—	38
Woman to Woman: Songs of Life	Released: August 8, 2006; Label: Verity; Formats: CD, digital download	87	1	49	—
Happy Holidays	Released: October 2, 2007; Label: Destiny Joy; Formats: CD, digital download	—	5	—	—
How I Got Over	Released: August 4, 2009; Label: Destiny Joy; Formats: CD, digital download	67	1	—	—

=== Compilation albums ===
Title	Album details
Best of All	Released: 1991; Label: Light; Formats: CD, cassette
Best of Vickie Winans	Released: 2002; Label: CGI, Platinum Records; Formats: CD, cassette
Greatest Hits	Released: July 26, 2005; Label: CGI, Platinum Records; Formats: CD, cassette

=== Live albums ===
Title	Album details	Peak chart positions
Title	Album details	US Gospel
Live in Detroit	Released: June 24, 1997; Label: Intersound; Formats: CD	10
Live in Detroit II	Released: April 20, 1999; Label: Intersound; Formats: CD	3
Share the Laughter	Released: July 27, 1999; Label: CGI, Platinum Records; Formats: CD	—

== Singles ==
List of songs with selected chart positions, showing year released and album name
Title	Year	Peak chart positions	Album
Title	Year	US Gospel	Album
"We Shall Behold Him"	1987	—	Be Encouraged
"First Trumpet Sound"	1987	—	Be Encouraged
"Sweeter than the Honeycomb"	1987	—	Be Encouraged
"Everyday with Jesus"	1989	—	Total Victory
"Victory"	1990	—	Total Victory
"Don't Throw Your Life Away"	1991	—	The Lady
"Just When" (featuring Marvin Winans)	1991	—	The Lady
"Work It Out"	1994	—	Vickie Winans
"Long as I Got King Jesus (Don't Need No One Else)"	1997	—	Live in Detroit
"More than Enough"	1997	—	Live in Detroit
"Already Been to the Water"	1999	—	Live in Detroit II
"Oh What Love"	1999	—	Live in Detroit II
"I Hear the Music in the Air"	1999	—	Live in Detroit II
"Shake Yourself Loose"	2003	—	Bringing It All Together
"We Need a Word from the Lord"	2003	—	Bringing It All Together
"It's Alright"	2005	2	Woman to Woman: Songs of Life
"The Rainbow"	2006	—	Woman to Woman: Songs of Life
"How I Got Over"	2009	8	How I Got Over
