= Bold (album) =

Studio album by Angie & Debbie Winans
- Released: December 19, 1997
- Genre: Religious
- Length: 53:57
- Label: ATF Records
- Producer: Cedric & Victor Caldwell

Angie & Debbie Winans chronology
Angie & Debbie (1993)	Bold (1997)

Professional ratings
Review scores
Source	Rating
Allmusic	3/5 stars

Bold is the second album by Angie & Debbie Winans, released in 1997. Angelique and Debra Renee are the ninth and tenth siblings, respectively, in the Winans family, a family of gospel music artists from Detroit, Michigan. This album contains a song entitled "Not Natural", denouncing homosexuality. This led to protests by GLAAD.

== Track listing ==
No.	Title	Writer(s)	Length
1.	"Rebuke the Devil"	Victor Caldwell	4:08
2.	"I Believe"	Angie Winans; Debra Winans; Michael Ellis Wright	4:42
3.	"Never Gonna"	Michael Ellis Wright; Cedric Caldwell; Victor Caldwell; Angie Winans; Debra Winans	4:45
4.	"Not Natural"	Cedric Caldwell; Victor Caldwell; Angie Winans; Debra Winans	3:34
5.	"Love Won't"	Cedric Caldwell; Victor Caldwell; Angie Winans	4:37
6.	"Sounds Like Love"	Cedric Caldwell; Victor Caldwell; Debra Winans	3:52
7.	"Strange Woman (Intro)"	Carvin Winans	0:50
8.	"Strange Woman"	Carvin Winans	4:39
9.	"Love Will Lead the Way"	Debra Winans	4:42
10.	"Told You So"	Keith Crouch; Kristle Murden	4:43
11.	"Watch What I Tell You"	Victor Caldwell; Debra Winans	3:55
12.	"Can't Understand"	Debra Winans; Mario Winans	3:51
13.	"Ryan's Song"	Cedric Caldwell; Angie Caldwell	4:24
14.	"Love Won't (Reprise)"	Cedric Caldwell; Victor Caldwell; Angie Winans	1:15
Total length:			53:57

== Musicians ==
- Guitars: Paul Jackson, Andrew Ramsey
- Drums: Dee Holt
- Trumpet Solo: Rod McGaha
- Sax solo: Mark Douthit
- Strings: Nashville String Machine
- String Conductor & Arr.: Ronn Huff
- All other instruments, Track arr.: Cedric Caldwell, Victor Caldwell
- Background vocals: Tiffany Palmer, Duawne Starling, Debbie Winans, Angie Winans
- Bold voice: Duane Hamilton
- Strange Woman Intro: Tiffany Palmer
- Rap Vocal: Mike-E (Michael Ellis Wright)
- Lead vocals: Debbie Winans, Angie Winans

== Production ==
- Engineers: Cedric Caldwell, Victor Caldwell, Joey Verge, Bryant Russell
- Recorded at: Father's Image, Quad Studio
- Mixed by: Cedric Caldwell, Victor Caldwell
- Mixed at: Father's Image
- Producers: Cedric Caldwell, Victor Caldwell for Caldwell Plus Production
- Mastering: Marty Williams at The Workstation
- Art Direction: Louis Upkins, Jr.
- Design: Louis Upkins, Jr. - DesignHouse, Wendi Powell - Kairos Designs
- Hair: Sandy Alsup, Shelia Littleton
- Photographer: Michael Gomez
- Stylist: Rene' Image Agency
- Make-Up: Derrick Rutledge, For About Face
- Exicutive Producers: Cedric Caldwell, Victor Caldwell, Angie Winans, Debbie Winans

All track information and credits were taken from the CD liner notes.
