= Christmas: Our Gifts to You =

Studio album by The Winans
- Released: November 2000
- Genre: Gospel, Christmas
- Label: Against The Flow

Christmas...Our Gifts To You is a Christmas album by The Winans, released in 2000 and featuring many members of the Winans family, and the ninth and final studio album by the group.

== Track listing ==
1. "Hark! the Herald Angels Sing" by Marvin Winans [5:33]
2. "Have Yourself a Merry Little Christmas" by Angie Winans [4:08]
3. "O Come All Ye Faithful" by CeCe Winans [4:37]
4. "Silent Night" by Ann McCrary [3:01]
5. "Go Tell It on the Mountain" by Pop Winans [4:46]
6. "Angels We Have Heard on High" by Kirk & Kevin Whalum [5:40]
7. "The True Meaning of Christmas" by Reverend Virgil Caldwell [5:06]
8. "What Child Is This?" by Mom Winans [5:19]
9. "Little Drummer Boy" by Darwin Hobbs [6:42]
10. "Mary Had a Little Lamb" by Sharon Moore-Caldwell M.D. [4:01]
11. "A Christmas Moment With Pop Winans" by Pop Winans [1:07]
12. "Sweet Little Jesus Boy" by Ronald Winans & Adrian Smith [4:44]
13. "Ryan's Song" by Angie Winans [4:22]

== Album credits ==
- Ann McCrary - Performer
- Nashville String Machine - Strings
- Shandra Penix - Vocals (Background)
- Kirk Whalum - Arranger, Instrumentation, Saxophone
- Marty Williams - Mastering
- Angie Winans - Performer
- Marvin Winans - Arranger, Vocal Arrangement
- Vic C. - Arranger, Mixing, Instrumentation, Engineer
- CeCe Winans - Arranger
- Ced C - Arranger, Instrumentation, Mixing, Engineer
- Mom Winans - Performer
- Pop Winans - Performer
- Kevin Whalum - Performer
- Darwin Hobbs - Vocals (Background), Vocal Arrangement
- LeAnne Palmore - Vocals (Background)
- Erick Anderson - Design, Photography
- Jarad Woods - Vocals (Background)
- Jovaun Woods - Vocals (Background)
- Charzet D. Wright - Project Coordinator
- Weldon John Wright - Vocals
- Whitney Loy Wright - Vocals
- Winston James Wright - Vocals
- Carlous Drake - Vocals (Background)
- Ron Winans - Arranger
- Ronn Huff - String Arrangements, String Conductor
- James Blair - Drums
- Victor Caldwell - Producer
- Mike Haynes - Mastering
- Paul Jackson, Jr. - Guitar
- The Winans - Main Performer
