= Return (The Winans album) =

Studio album by the Winans
- Released: 1990
- Studios: Mastersound (Atlanta, Georgia); Selah (Detroit, Michigan); Creative Source Recorders (Hollywood, California); Encore (Burbank, California); Soundworks (New York City, New York); Echoes (Sharpsburg, Maryland)
- Genres: Gospel; new jack swing
- Length: 49:19
- Label: Qwest
- Producers: Bernard Belle; Teddy Riley; the Winans; Michael J. Powell; Marvin Winans

The Winans chronology
Live at Carnegie Hall (1988)	Return (1990)	All Out (1993)

Return is the seventh album by the American musical group the Winans, released in 1990. It was their third album for Qwest Records. The first single was "It's Time", which was re-edited to change the rap elements when gospel audiences objected. The Winans supported the album with North American tour. Some critics dubbed the album's sound "new jack gospel".

The album peaked at No. 90 on the Billboard 200. It sold more than 500,000 copies. Return was nominated for a Grammy Award for "Best Contemporary Soul Gospel Album". It won the Soul Train Music Award for Best Gospel Album.

== Production ==
The album was produced primarily by Michael J. Powell. Teddy Riley produced some of the album's new jack swing-influenced tracks. Kenny G, Aaron Hall, and Stevie Wonder were among the album's guest musicians.

== Critical reception ==
Professional ratings
Review scores
Source	Rating
AllMusic	1.5/5 stars
The Rolling Stone Album Guide	2/5 stars

The Washington Post wrote that "the merger of their soaring sermonizing and [Riley's] decidedly secular new jack swing is heaven-sent." The Austin American-Statesman opined that "It's Time" "is a tremendous leap... With its tough-talking rap and Teddy Riley-produced groove, it sounds more like a Bobby Brown single than a gospel tune." Spin deemed the album "one of the hippest, tightest—all the words ending in est—gospel albums ever... Return cooks."

AllMusic wrote: "A soul act on Motown sounds like one on Epic sounds like one on Qwest—all twinkling synthesizers, obnoxious drum machines doing the same programmed beats, all low smooth bass, all the same neatly arranged vocal harmonies. It's all very professional, all very formal, and one wonders, even with gospel acts like the Winans, whether there's any soul left after the gloss has leeched out the interesting wrinkles."

== Track listing ==
No.	Title	Writer(s)	Length
1.	"It's Time (feat. Teddy Riley)"	Bernard Belle, Teddy Riley, Carvin Winans, Marvin Winans	5:19
2.	"Everyday the Same (feat. Stevie Wonder)"	Marvin Winans	4:56
3.	"Don't Leave Me"	Carvin Winans, Marvin Winans, Michael Winans, Ronald Winans	5:40
4.	"A Friend (feat. Aaron Hall)"	Belle, Riley, Tammy Lucas	5:54
5.	"Gonna Be Alright"	Carvin Winans, Jennifer E. Brantley	4:40
6.	"When You Cry (feat. Kenny G)"	Carvin Winans, Leroy Hyter	6:03
7.	"Together We Stand"	Marvin Winans	5:01
8.	"This Time It's Personal"	Carvin Winans, Michael Winans, Regina Winans	3:42
9.	"Free"	Lanar Brantley	4:23
10.	"Wherever I Go"	Marvin Winans	3:57
