= Desiree Coleman =

American singer

- Born: September 12, 1966 (age 60); Queens, New York, U.S.
- Genres: R&B, pop, gospel, urban
- Occupations: Singer, actress
- Years active: 1983–present
- Label: Motown (1988–1989)
- Spouse: Mark Jackson (m. 1990; div. 2017)
- Website: Desiree Coleman on Facebook

Desiree Coleman, also known as Kadesh, is an American vocalist and actress.

== Early life ==
Coleman discovered her ability to sing at the age of six. Desiree's mother on hearing her daughter's voice encouraged her to join the St. Luke Baptist Church choir in Queens, New York. During her growing years, she did several commercials and by age fourteen became a part of a community choir called the Soul Searchers of New York City.

== Career ==
Coleman came on the scene replacing Tisha Campbell in the longest running off-Broadway musical production of Mama, I Want to Sing!, in 1983. She played the role of singer Doris Troy in the musical, which is based on Troy's life. She then played in Bob Fosse's Broadway show Big Deal.

Desiree Coleman released a self-titled album in 1988 through Motown. The Kansas City Star said of the album "This album isn't awful, but the next one, if all involved are challenged a little more, should better." She put out the single "Romance" in November 1988 and then the track "To Stay Together" was released as a single in early 1989. As one of four leads in the musical Born to Sing, a sequel to Mama, I Want to Sing!, the Washington Post reviewer wrote that Coleman "plays her brassy part to the hilt" in a 1997 performance. One of the performers at the 1997 edition of DIVAS Simply Singing, a concert fundraiser produced by Sheryl Lee Ralph; Los Angeles Times wrote that her "vocal pyrotechnics very nearly [stole] the entire show."

In 2002, she toured for the McDonald's Gospelfest with Hezekiah Walker, Vickie Winans, Cissy Houston, and the group Virtue. Coleman recorded a song with WWE in 2006 titled "Holla", which later became the entrance music for WWE Diva Kelly Kelly.

== Personal life ==
Coleman is the ex-wife of former professional basketball player and former head coach of the Golden State Warriors, Mark Jackson. As co-pastors, they founded the True Love Worship Center International, a nondenominational church for which they rented out a church in Van Nuys, Los Angeles.
