= McDonald's Gospelfest =

Annual music festival

Coordinates: 40.7332°N 74.1723°W

- Genre: Gospel music
- Date: Annually in May
- Frequency: Annual
- Venue: The Prudential Center
- Locations: Newark, New Jersey
- Founded: 1983
- Founders: A. Curtis Farrow
- Sponsor: McDonald's

The McDonald's Gospelfest is an annual gospel music festival, talent competition, and fundraiser. The Gospelfest is produced by Newark, New Jersey-based Irving Street Rep and is directed and hosted by its founder, A. Curtis Farrow.[13]

== Background ==
The event, inaugurated in 1983, and sponsored by McDonald's, takes place in spring and has been held at the Prudential Center since 2008. The closing night contest and ceremony is produced, directed, and hosted by A. Curtis Farrow. The event, which can take several hours, has been recorded and broadcast variously on WABC-TV and WWOR-TV. Involving more than a thousand performers, it has been described as the "largest collection of gospel talent ever assembled" and the "most spectacular gospel celebration in the nation". The event is followed up by McDonald's Inspiration Celebration which makes a national tour.

== History ==
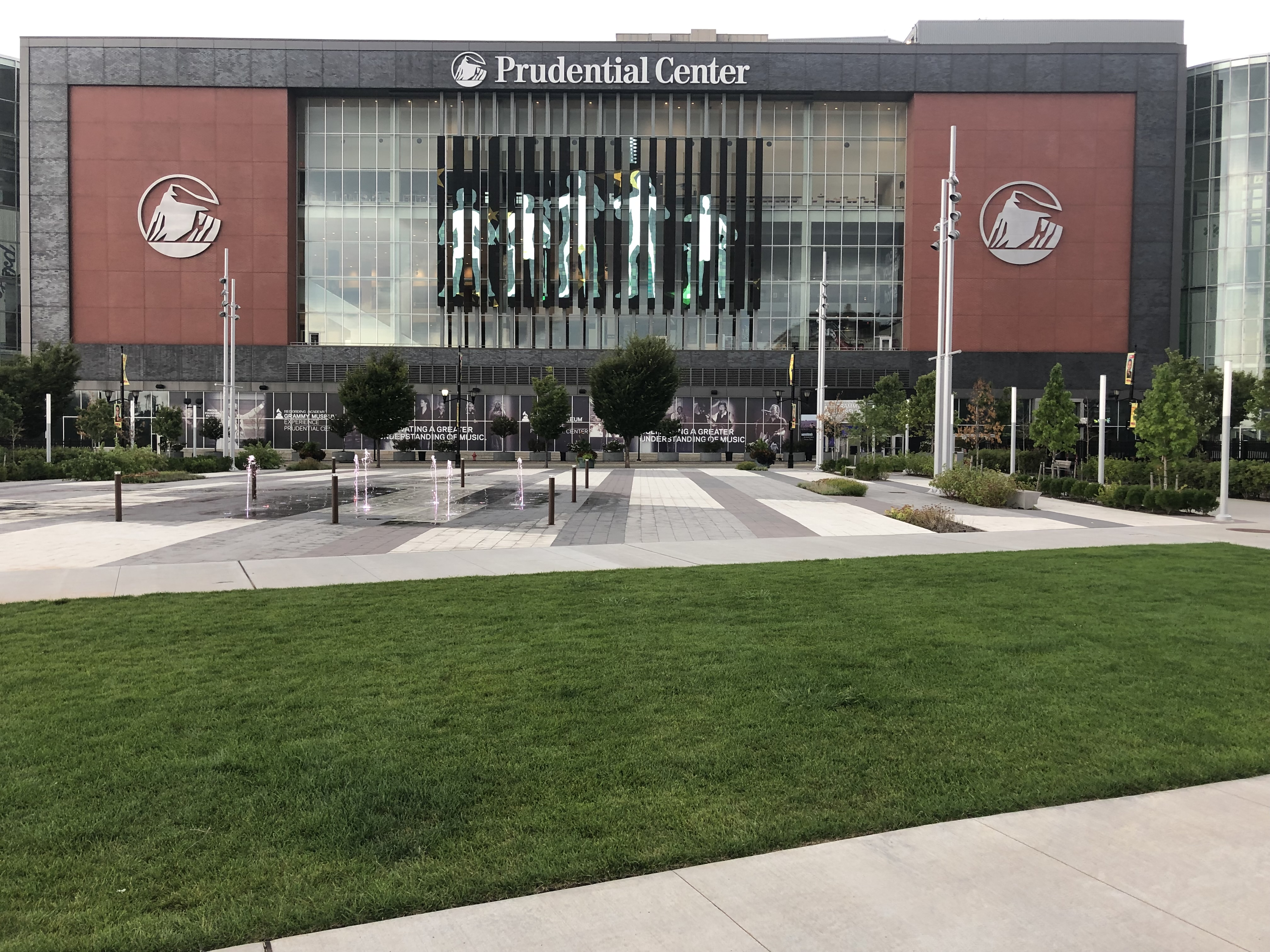
Gospelfest takes place at the Prudential Center

McDonald's Gospelfest originated in 1983 under the auspices of the McDonald's Corporation and the McDonald's Tri-State Owners' Association. The event has been an important fundraising event which supports education opportunities within local communities. and has awarded millions of dollars in scholarship money. Over the years the competition performances have taken place at Palace Theater, the Hammerstein Ballroom, Westbury Music Fair, Newark Symphony Hall, Madison Square Garden, and New York City Center. Since 2008, the 25th incarnation of the event, it has been held at Prudential Center. Parts of the show have been broadcast by WABC, which in 2000 and 2001 garnered New York Emmy Awards for WABC in the "Religious Programming" category. The show is since 2006 televised on WWOR-TV. The Gospelfest is produced by Newark-based Irving Street Rep and is directed and hosted by its founder, A. Curtis Farrow.

Greater Newark has a long tradition of gospel and jazz, having begun in the 1910s with the Coleman Brothers. Savoy Records gave many early artists opportunities to record. Alex Bradford was musical director of the Abyssinian Baptist Church Cissy Houston, a member of The Drinkard Singers and The Sweet Inspirations and mentor to numerous singers, has long been a driving force behind the New Hope Baptist Church and the Gospelfest. Newark Symphony Hall is home to the NSH Special Ensemble, which was selected as the Gospelfest Youth Choir Winner in 2011, and hosts the "When Praise Goes Up!" annual gospel showcase. The affiliated Newark Boys Chorus also includes spirals in its repertory. In 1980, the former movie palace Stanley Theater became the Newark Gospel Tabernacle. Newark is one of seven cities nationwide to host the touring gospel music competition "How Sweet the Sound".

== Competition ==
Auditions and semi-finalist competitions are held in tri-state New York-New Jersey-Connecticut each year prior to the Gospelfest. There are fourteen categories:

1. Praise Dance Group
2. Praise Dance Solo-Trio
3. Gospel Rap
4. Gospel Comedian
5. Gospel Poetry
6. Step
7. Adult Choir
8. Group Soul
9. Contemporary
10. Spanish Language Soloist
11. Teen Soloist
12. Gospel Soloist
13. Youth Choir
14. Out-of-Town Choir

== 2026 ==
McDonald’s Gospelfest 2026's three performances took place on Mother’s Day weekend in May at Palladium Times Square. It featured The Clark Sisters, Jennifer Holliday, and Le’Andria Johnson.

== 2025 ==
The 42nd Annual McDonald's Gospelfest was presented four times in 2025. Venues were Union County Performing Arts Center; Lehman College in the Bronx; and Palladium Times Square (two shows on Mother's Day Weekend Saturday, May 10th)

== 2023 ==
In May 2023 the festival held its 40th anniversary event.

== 2021 A Holy Ghost Party ==
Originally planned for Mother's Day, 9 May 2020, the 38th annual Gospelfest was rescheduled for 8 May 2021 as officials decided to put the Gospelfest on hiatus. The program includes Yolanda Adams, Kelly Price, Hezekiah Walker with his Love Fellowship Tabernacle Choir, Tramaine Hawkins, Deitrick Haddon, Jonathan McReynolds, with special guest appearance by Erica Campbell. Local artists include Group Fire and Tiffany Andrews.

== 2019 A Tribute to Aretha Franklin ==
The 2019 Gospelfest took place Saturday, May 11, 2019, at Prudential Center. The line-up included Tamar Braxton, Yolanda Adams, Bishop Hezekiah Walker, Shirley Caesar, Fred Hammond, and the Greater Allen AME Cathedral Mass Choir.

== 2018 Praise Break ==
The 36th Annual McDonald's Gospelfest took place at Newark Symphony Hall on Saturday September 14th. It featured a line-up of gospel artists including Bishop Hezekiah Walker, Keith Wonderboy Johnson, Jekalyn Carr, Cissy Houston, Melba Moore, Le'Andria Johnson, VaShawn Mitchell, and Wess Morgan.

== 2017 ==
2017 continued the Mother's Day weekend tradition Saturday May 13th! This year's event features Donnie McClurkin, Erica Campbell, Bishop Hezekiah Walker, Israel Houghton, Bishop Paul S. Morton, Fantasia Barrino, Anthony Brown & Group Therapy, and Greater Allen AME Cathedral.

== 2016 Honor Thy Mother ==
Saturday, May 7, 2016, on Mother's Day Weekend, featuring Yolanda Adams, Tamela Mann, Bishop Hezekiah Walker & LFC, Shirley Caesar, Donnie McClurkin, Jennifer Holliday and others.

== 2015 When the Choir Meets the Quartet ==
May 9, 2015, with Bishop Hezekiah Walker & LFC (Love Fellowship Choir), Ricky Dillard & New G, Mighty Clouds of Joy, the Five Blind Boys of Alabama, Mississippi Mass Choir, the Thompson Community Reunion Choir, Greater Allen AME Cathedral Mass Choir, Doc McKenzie & The Hi-Lites, and the Clark Sisters.

== 2014 Women Who Worship ==
The 2014 Gospelfest took place on Saturday May 10 before Mothers Day. Auditions were held in January. Among those who participated are some most popular female artists in gospel: Shirley Caesar, Vickie Winans, CeCe Winans, The Clark Sisters, Dorothy Norwood, Kim Burrell, Yolanda Adams, Dottie Peoples, Tramaine Hawkins, Cissy Houston and Melba Moore.

== Gospelfest 2013 ==
Auditions for Gospelfest 2013 took place in January. The show, which lasted eight hours, took place May 11, 2013 and included performances by Aretha Franklin, Donnie McClurkin, Smokie Norful, John P. Kee and Lecrae. and Hezekiah Walker.

== 2012 Honor Thy Mother ==
One thousand performers chosen from 80,000 contestants took the stage for the May 12, 2012 Mother's Day event. Among the headliners were Shirley Caesar, Donnie McClurkin, Vickie Winans, Fred Hammond, Mary Mary, Steve Harvey and Cissy Houston. The festival was also seen as a tribute to Whitney Houston, with roots in Newark, who had died earlier in the year and whose funeral services were held at the New Hope Baptist Church.

== 2011 The Mighty Men of Valour ==
On June 18, 2011, the Father's Day show had more than 1,100 competitors chosen from over 40,000 people who auditioned and included some of the biggest names in gospel: Kirk Franklin, Donnie McClurkin, Bishop Hezekiah Walker, James Fortune, Bobby Jones, and Bishop TD Jakes. This event was noted for showing the changing face and diversification of gospel music.

== Gospelfest 2010 ==
There were 80,000 audition contestants of whom 850 were chosen to perform in the event which took place on June 19, 2010. Headliners included Bishop TD Jakes, Bishop Hezekiah Walker, Keith 'Wonderboy' Johnson, Regina Belle, J Moss, Dionne Warwick, Roberta Flack, Vickie Winans, Cissy Houston, KOHSHI, and Kurt Carr and The Kurt Carr Singers.

== 2009 What a Fellowship ==
Of the over 80,000 people auditioned, over 1,500 competitors took part in the Gospelfest on Saturday, June 13, 2009 . The post-competition concert included Patti LaBelle, Donnie McClurkin, CeCe Winans, Regina Belle, J. Moss, Vickie Winans, Bebe Winans, Cissy Houston, and Bishop Hezekiah Walker.

== 2008 25 Years of Glory - Let There be Peace! ==
On June 14, 2008, its twenty-fifth anniversary, the Gospelfest increased its participant and audience capacity and for the first time was held in the arena recently opened Prudential Center. Kirk Franklin, Donnie McClurkin, the Mighty Clouds of Joy, Hezekiah Walker and the Love Fellowship Choir, Byron Cage, Vickie Winans and Cissy Houston were among the headliners who performed in the evening concert.

== See also ==
- GMA Dove Award
- African-American Music Appreciation Month
