= One World One Love =

Studio album by Michael Bolton
- Released: September 21, 2009
- Studio: Passion Studios (Westport, Connecticut); Chalice Recording Studios (Hollywood, California); Larrabee Sound Studios and Mitch's Bedroom (North Hollywood, California); Westlake Studios and Small Mercies Studio (Los Angeles, California); Jam Studios (Burbank, California); Dutchland Studios (Nashville, Tennessee); MixStar Studios (Virginia Beach, Virginia); Metropolis Studios, Sarm West Studios and 600feet Productions (London, UK); Underground Studios (Jamaica); LIMESTONE (Stockholm, Sweden)
- Genre: Pop
- Length: 45:09 (International Release); 44:42 (US Release)
- Label: Universal Motown
- Producer: Adam Messinger; Nasri Atweh; Bass Over Babylon; Neil Case; Steve Chrisanthou; Conroy Forte; Tyrone Jackson; Brian Jobson; Kwame Kandekore; Emanuel Kiriakou; Shannon "Slam" Lawrence; Mike Mani; Jordan Omley; Sharon Robinson; Juan Winans

Michael Bolton chronology
A Swingin' Christmas (2007)	One World One Love (2009)	Gems: The Duets Collection (2011)

Professional ratings
Review scores
Source	Rating
AllMusic	3/5 stars
The New York Times	(mixed)

One World One Love is an album by Michael Bolton, with collaborations by Tami Chynn, Ne-Yo and Lady Gaga.

== Track listing ==
No.	Title	Writer(s)	Producer(s)	Length
1.	"Ready For You"	Nasri Atweh; Adam Messinger; Michael Bolton	Adam Messinger; Nasri	4:00
2.	"Just One Love"	Jordan Omley; Mike Mani; Bolton	The JAM	4:12
3.	"Need You To Fall"	Juan Winans; Mat Kearney; Shannon Lawrence; Robert Marvin; Josiah Bell	Juan Winans; Shannon "Slam" Lawrence; Adam Messinger (co.)	3:40
4.	"Hope It's Too Late"	Emanuel Kiriakou; Kasia Livingston; Bolton	Emanuel Kiriakou	3:08
5.	"Can You Feel Me" (featuring Tami Chynn)	Tammar Chin; Tessanne Chin; Tyrone Jackson; Brian Jobson; Neil Case	Bass Over Babylon; Conroy Forte Jr.; Tyrone Jackson; Kwame Kandekore; Adam Messinger (co.)	3:59
6.	"The Best"	Omley; Mani; Bolton; Shaffer Smith	The JAM	4:06
7.	"Murder My Heart" (Backing vocals on select versions by Lady Gaga)	Omley; Mani; Bolton; Stefani Germanotta	The JAM	4:05
8.	"You Comfort Me"	Atweh; Messinger; Bolton	Adam Messinger; Nasri	3:43
9.	"Sign Your Name" (Terence Trent D'Arby cover)	Sanada Maitreya	Adam Messinger	3:30
10.	"Invisible Tattoo" (Sharon Robinson cover)	Sharon Robinson	Adam Messinger; Sharon Robinson (add.)	4:03
11.	"Survivor"	Omley; Mani; Bolton	The JAM	3:55
12.	"Crazy Love" (Van Morrison cover)	Van Morrison	Steve Chrisanthou; Adam Messinger	2:48
Total length:				45:09

US version
No.	Title	Writer(s)	Producer(s)	Length
1.	"Just One Love"	Omley; Mani; Bolton	The JAM	4:12
2.	"Ready For You"	Atweh; Messinger; Bolton	Adam Messinger; Nasri	4:00
3.	"Hope It's Too Late"	Kiriakou; Livingston]]; Bolton	Emanuel Kiriakou	3:08
4.	"Murder My Heart"	Omley; Mani; Bolton; Germanotta	The JAM	4:05
5.	"The Best"	Omley; Mani; Bolton; Smith	The JAM	4:06
6.	"My Lady"	Atweh; Messinger; Bolton	Adam Messinger; Nasri	3:24
7.	"Need You to Fall"	Winans; Kearney; Lawrence; Marvin; Bell	Juan Winans; Shannon "Slam" Lawrence; Adam Messinger (co.)	3:40
8.	"Sign Your Name" (Terence Trent D'Arby cover)	Maitreya	Adam Messinger	3:30
9.	"What You're Doing to Me"	Steven McMorran; Harry Sommerdahl	Harry Sommerdahl; Steven McMorran	4:10
10.	"Survivor"	Omley; Mani; Bolton	The JAM	3:55
11.	"You Comfort Me"	Atweh; Messinger; Bolton	Adam Messinger; Nasri	3:43
12.	"Crazy Love" (Van Morrison cover)	Morrison	Steve Chrisanthou; Adam Messinger	2:48
Total length:				44:41

== Personnel ==
- Michael Bolton – vocals
- Adam Messinger – all instrumentation (1, 8–10), organ (3), additional percussion (3, 12), additional guitars (12), all instrumentation on "My Lady"
- Michael Mani – keyboards (2, 6, 7, 11), programming (2, 6, 7, 11)
- Josiah Bell – programming (3)
- Robert Marvin – programming (3)
- Juan Winans – string programming (3), backing vocals (3)
- Emanuel Kiriakou – all instruments (4), programming (4)
- Harry Sommerdahl – keyboards, programming and guitars on "What You're Doing to Me"
- Paul Siddell – keyboards (12)
- Steve Chrisanthou – programming (12), guitars (12)
- Michael Thompson – guitars (2, 6, 7, 11), additional guitars (3, 5)
- Mat Kearney – guitars (3)
- Akil Thompson – guitars (3)
- Andy Thornton – bass (12)
- Nasri Atweh – backing vocals (1, 3, 8–10), backing vocals on "My Lady"
- Mike Lett – backing vocals (1)
- Rhona Bennett – backing vocals (2)
- Ravaughn Brown – backing vocals (2)
- Jimmy Burney – backing vocals (2)
- Kasia Livingston – backing vocals (4)
- Tami Chynn – vocals (5)
- Ne-Yo – vocals (6)
- Natalie Anderson – backing vocals (9)
- Ladonna Harley-Peters – backing vocals (9, 12)
- Susan Harriott – backing vocals (9, 12)
- Jenniffer Kästel – backing vocals (9)
- Karlene Wray – backing vocals (9)
- Sharon Robinson – backing vocals (10)
- Cara Robinson – backing vocals (12)

=== Production ===
- Josh Feldman – A&R
- Aimee Nadeau – A&R
- Michael Bolton – executive producer, recording (7)
- Steve Chrisanthou – additional BGV production and recording (9), editing (12)
- Adam Messinger – mixing (1, 3, 5, 8–10, 12), mixing on "My Lady"
- Mike Mani – recording (2, 6, 7, 11), mixing (2, 6, 11)
- Jordan Omley – recording (2, 6, 7, 11), mixing (2, 6, 11)
- Steve Milo – lead vocal recording (3, 5, 7, 9, 10, 12), BGV recording (3, 10, 12)
- Pat Thrall – engineer (4), editing (4)
- Serban Ghenea – mixing (4)
- Manny Marroquin – mixing (7)
- Chris Steffen – engineer on "What You're Doing to Me"
- Steven McMorran – mixing on "What You're Doing to Me"
- Harry Sommerdahl – mixing on "What You're Doing to Me"
- Bobby Campbell – assistant engineer (3, 5, 9)
- Eric Rennecker – assistant engineer (3, 5, 9)
- Todd Steinhauer – assistant engineer (3, 5, 9)
- Brian Warwick – assistant engineer (3, 5, 9)
- John Hanes – mix assistant (4)
- Ted Jensen – mastering at Sterling Sound (New York City, New York)
- Meredith Oliver – A&R administration
- Gillian Russell – A&R administration
- Jeri Heiden – album artwork
- Andrew MacPherson – album photography
- Rebecca Mink – stylist
- Robin Fitzgerald – styling assistant
- Tom Consolo for Front Line Management – management

== Certifications and sales ==
Region	Certification	Certified units/sales
Romania (UFPR)	Gold	
United States	—	25,000

== Release history ==
Country	Date	Label(s)	Format	Catalogue
United Kingdom	September 21, 2009	The Universal Music Record Label	CD, Digital download	2718902
Canada	February 3, 2010	Universal Music	CD, Digital download	397092
United States	May 4, 2010	Universal Motown	CD, Digital download	101497492

== See also ==
- List of certified albums in Romania
