= The Monotones =

American doo-wop vocal group

- Origin: Newark, New Jersey, United States
- Genres: Doo-wop, rock and roll
- Years active: 1955–1962, 1980–2005
- Labels: Mascot; Chess Records
- Past members: Charles Patrick; Warren Davis; George Malone; Frankie Smith; John Ryanes; Warren Ryanes: Carl Foushee; Tommy Reed; Victor Hartsfield; Bernard Brown; Bernard Ransom; Joseph Eaton

The Monotones were a six-member American doo-wop vocal group in the 1950s. They are considered a one-hit wonder, as their only hit single was "The Book of Love", which peaked at number five on the Billboard Top 100 in 1958.

== Biography ==
The Monotones formed in 1955, when the seven original singers, all residents of the Baxter Terrace housing project in Newark, New Jersey, began performing covers of popular songs. They were:

- Lead singer Charles Howard Patrick (September 11, 1938 – September 11, 2020)
- First tenor Warren Davis (March 1, 1939 – April 17, 2016)
- Second tenor George Malone (January 5, 1940 – October 5, 2007)
- Bass singer Frankie Smith (May 13, 1938 – November 26, 2000)
- Second bass singer John Ryanes (November 16, 1940 – May 30, 1972)
- Baritone Warren Ryanes (December 14, 1937 – June 16, 1982)

Charles Patrick's brother James was originally a member, but he left soon after the group's formation. John Ryanes and Warren Ryanes were also brothers.

They all began singing with the New Hope Baptist Choir, directed by Cissy Houston, who was related to the Patrick brothers. The group launched their career with a 1956 appearance on Ted Mack's Amateur Hour television program, winning first prize for their rendition of the Cadillacs' "Zoom". Soon afterwards, Charles Patrick was listening to the radio and heard a Pepsodent toothpaste commercial with the line "wonder where the yellow went". From there, he got the idea for the line, "I wonder, wonder, wonder who!, who wrote the book of love", later working it up into a song with Davis and Malone. In September 1957, they recorded "The Book of Love", which was released on the Mascot label in December that year. The small record company could not cope with its popularity, and it was reissued on Chess Records' subsidiary Argo label in February 1958. It became a hit, eventually reaching number three on the Billboard R&B chart and number five on the pop chart. The record sold over one million copies. It also reached No. 5 in Australia; in the UK, the hit version was a cover version by The Mudlarks.

The Monotones recorded a series of novelty follow-ups including "Zombi", and "The Legend of Sleepy Hollow", but they were not successful.

The Monotones disbanded in 1962. Surviving members met to revive "The Book of Love" several times after the break-up. John Ryanes died in 1972, aged 31, and his brother Warren died in 1982. By 1994, the Monotones consisted of Frankie Smith, George Malone, Carl Foushee, Bernard Ransom, Bernard Brown (died in 2009, aged 62), and Victor Hartsfield. Frankie Smith died in 2000, and George Malone in 2007.

== Singles ==
(listing incomplete)

- "The Book of Love" / "You Never Loved Me" (Mascot 124 1957/Argo 5290), 1958
- "Tom Foolery" / "Zombi" (Argo 5301), 1958
- "The Legend of Sleepy Hollow" / "Soft Shadows" (Argo 5321), 1958
- "Tell It to the Judge" / "Fools Will Be Fools" (Argo 5339), 1959
- "Reading the Book of Love" / "Dream" (Hull 735), 1959
- "Daddy's Home, But Mama's Gone" / "Tattle Tale" (Hull 743), 1961
