= James M. Baxter =

First African-American school principal in Newark, New Jersey

- Born: c. 1845; Philadelphia
- Died: December 28, 1909 (aged 63–64)
- Known for: First African-American principal of a school in Newark, New Jersey

James Miller Baxter (c. 1845 – December 28, 1909) was the first African-American principal of a school in Newark, New Jersey, taking the position at age 19 in 1864 and serving as Newark's only African – American principal until 1909, shortly before his death.

Baxter was born in Philadelphia to James and Elizabeth Baxter, part of the city's small African-American middle class. In 1861 at age 16 he enrolled at the Institute for Colored Youth and graduated from the 4-year program in 3 years. After graduation he was elected as an officer of an African-American literary and debate society, the Frederick Douglass Lyceum.

Two months after accepting a teaching position teaching position at Newark's State Street Public School, he was appointed the school's principal. In 1869 he opened a night school open to older students.

Baxter was a member of Alpha Lodge No. 116, the first Masonic lodge composed primarily of African-Americans and recognized by the State Grand Lodge systems in the United States. Alpha Lodge No. 116 is under the jurisdiction of the Grand Lodge of New Jersey. He held various positions, serving as Master of the lodge in 1881, 1882, 1885, 1888 and 1892.

Baxter married Pauline L. Baxter in 1877 and they parented five children, Elizabeth Baxter (b.1878), James L. Baxter (b. 1881), George Baxter (b. 1883), Louis Baxter (b. 1885), and Earnest Baxter (b. 1889). He retired in July 1909 and died in Newark from heart disease in December 1909.

He was known for insisting in 1871 that African – American children who had graduated from grammar school should be admitted to the all-white Newark High School. One of the graduates of his school, Irene Pataquan Mulford, became the first African – American student of the high school.

The James M. Baxter Terrace Housing Projects, completed in 1941, were named in his honor.
