= The Book of Love (The Monotones song) =

1957 single by the Monotones

"Book of Love"

Single by The Monotones

from the album Who Wrote The Book of Love
- B-side: "You Never Loved Me"
- Released: December 1957 (local release), February 1958 (nationwide release)
- Recorded: September 1957
- Genre: Rock and roll; rhythm and blues; doo-wop; pop
- Length: 2:24
- Label: Mascot (local release); Argo (nationwide release)
- Songwriters: Warren Davis; George Malone; Charles Patrick

"Book of Love" (also titled "(Who Wrote) The Book of Love") is a rock and roll/doo-wop song, originally by the Monotones. It was written by three members of the group, Warren Davis, George Malone, and Charles Patrick.

Lead singer Charles Patrick heard a Pepsodent toothpaste commercial with the line "you'll wonder where the yellow went"/ "when you brush your teeth with Pepsodent", which inspired him to come up with, "I wonder, wonder, wonder who, who wrote the book of love". He worked it up into a song with Davis and Malone. The "boom" part of the song was a result of a kid kicking a ball against the garage while they were rehearsing. It sounded good, so they added it to the song.

In September 1957, the Monotones recorded "The Book of Love"; it was released on the Mascot label in December that year. The small record company could not cope with its popularity, and it was reissued on Chess Records' subsidiary Argo label in February 1958. On the Billboard charts, "The Book of Love" peaked at number five on the pop chart and number three on the rhythm and blues chart. Outside the US, the song reached No. 5 in Australia.

== Cover versions ==
- In the UK, the Mudlarks did a successful rendition.
- In France, Tiny Yong released a cover version with French lyrics by Bernard Michel as the lead track of her 1964 EP Histoire d'amour.
- The Raindrops released a cover of the song as a single in 1964.

== In popular culture ==
- Rock and roll revival group Sha Na Na performed "The Book of Love" at Woodstock in 1969.
- The song is referenced in Don McLean's "American Pie" and in the lyrics of Led Zeppelin's "Rock and Roll".
- It was featured as a theme to the game show The Newlywed Game hosted by Paul Rodriguez after he replaced Bob Eubanks (1988–1989).
- In the Who's The Boss? episode "Tony and the Dreamtones", Tony and his singing group the Dreamtones rehearse and sing this song for a charity event. Angela sang this song to Tony, as well, and wanted to sing with them at the event.

== See also ==
- List of 1950s one-hit wonders in the United States
