= Juan Winans =

American musician

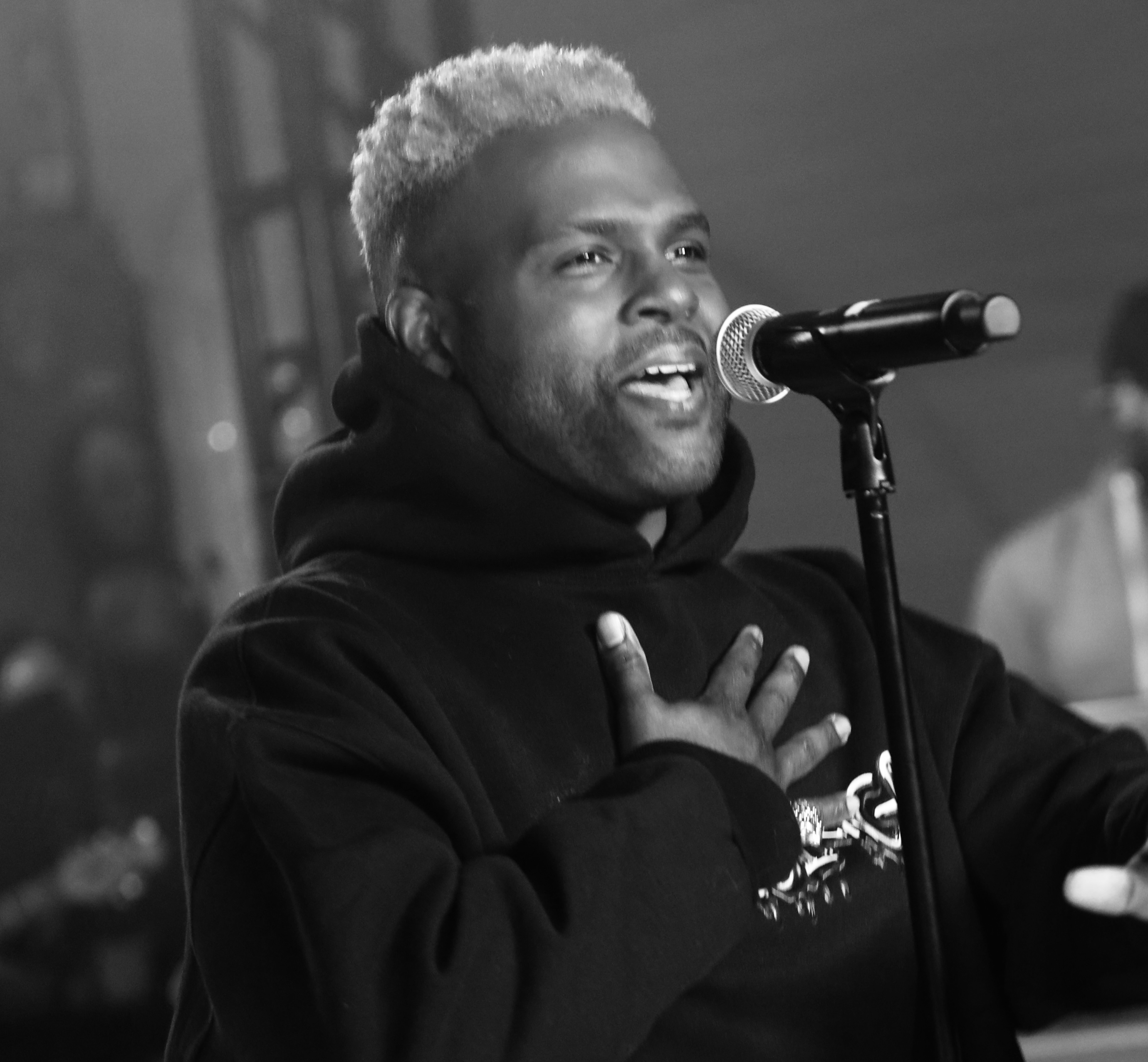

Juan Winans is an American singer-songwriter, record producer, actor, filmmaker and a third-generation member of the Winans family.

== Family and early life ==
Juan Winans was born in Detroit, Michigan, on July 24, the second child of four (Carvin Jr., Deborah Joy Winans & Ian) born to Carvin Winans (b. 1958) and Deborah Kerr Winans. He grew up on the west side of the city in the historic University District, a neighborhood bordered by Seven Mile Rd, W. McNichols, Woodward Avenue and Livernois Avenue. He attended Renaissance High School. His paternal grandparents, David (April 20, 1934 – April 8, 2009) and Delores Winans (September 22, 1936) met each other in 1951, at the ages of 17 and 16, while singing in the Lemon Gospel Chorus. They married two years later; the marriage lasted nearly sixty years, producing ten children. Mom & Pop Winans, as they would come to be known, had seven sons, David Jr, Ronald, Carvin, Marvin (Marvin Winans), Michael, Daniel, Benjamin (BeBe Winans), then three daughters, Priscilla (CeCe Winans), Angelique, and Debra. Both David's father and grandfather were preachers in the Pentecostal church, and he himself raised his ten children in a strict religious home. They taught their children how to sing and they honed their skills performing quartet music at their great-grandfather's church. However, it was not until 1980 that Marvin, Carvin, Michael and Ronald were discovered by Andrae Crouch, who signed them to Light Records as The Winans.

On January 1, 1981, Juan's father, Carvin Winans, along with three of his brothers, released their debut album, Introducing The Winans, embarking on a career that would earn them five Grammy Awards and the title First Family of Gospel music. In 1987 Juan's uncle and aunt released their debut album and became internationally known as BeBe & CeCe Winans. Several years later, in 1993, his father's youngest siblings, Angie & Debbie Winans, released their debut album.

== Music career ==
=== Winans Phase 2 ===
In the winter of 1997 the Winans were asked to compose and perform a theme song for a Detroit NBC affiliate. They approached their sons about recording the song with them. It was during this time that Juan first expressed an interest in pursuing music, stating in a 1999 interview for CCM Magazine, "I don't think I ever aspired to sing before we put this group together". He, along with his older brother Carvin and two cousins, Marvin Winans Jr and Michael Winans Jr., formed the group Winans Phase 2. In the following year they signed a record deal with Myrrh/Epic Records and began working on their debut album, entitled We Got Next, released in August 1999, with tracks from Rodney Jerkins, Narada Michael Walden, and Babyface. The album debuted at No. 1 on the Billboard Top Gospel Album's chart, and sold over 250,000 copies in the U.S. It was nominated for Best Contemporary Soul Gospel Album at the 42nd Grammy Awards, but lost the award to Yolanda Adams. The group was also featured on several national television shows, including The Oprah Winfrey Show, Donnie & Marie, Soul Train, and The Queen Latifah Show. In the spring of 2000 the group performed to crowds in the United Kingdom, Germany, and Amsterdam, promoting the release of We Got Next. A 2002 40-city tour by the entire Winans Family marked the unexpected end of the group.

Juan has never publicly spoken about why Winans Phase 2 never recorded again. However, former members Marvin and Michael have cited "internal problems" and "not really wanting to be an artist" as reasons for the group's breakup.

=== 2003-2007 ===
In 2003 Winans returned to the studio to record background vocals for his uncle BeBe Winans' Christmas album My Christmas Prayer. The following year he relocated to Nashville to concentrate on songwriting.

Later in 2004, Juan sang background vocals on Michelle Williams' album Do You Know, and Smokie Norful's Nothing Without You.

In 2005 Winans, along with Babyface, provided backing vocals for the song "I Said I Love You" from the Kirk Whalum release The Songs of Babyface. He is also credited with singing and arranging background vocals on George Huff's My Christmas EP. During this time Winans began attending Bethel World Outreach Church in Nashville, TN, where he led worship services for four years.

=== 2008–present ===
In 2008 Winans co-wrote the song "Seattle" for Gospel/R&B duo Mary Mary's platinum-selling fourth studio release, The Sound. The album proved to be their best-charting album to date, debuting No. 7 on the Billboard 200 and No. 2 on the US R&B chart, and topping the Gospel and Contemporary Christian Music charts. The album held the No. 1 position on the Billboard Gospel Albums chart for over six months after its release. Winans also collaborated with Heavy D on his Grammy Award-nominated album Vibes, co-writing and singing background vocals for the song "No Matter What".

The following year Winans composed the lyrics for and produced the song "Need You To Fall" for Michael Bolton. The song was released on Bolton's One World One Love album in September 2009 in the United Kingdom, and in the U.S. on May 4, 2010. In October 2010 Winans collaborated with producer Warryn Campbell and Lisa Kimmey to compose material for the Tyler Perry film For Colored Girls. They wrote the song "Sun", performed by Lalah Hathaway. It appears both in the film and on the soundtrack.

Winans once again teamed up with Warryn Campbell and Mary Mary on their fifth studio release, Something Big, co-writing "Catch Me" and "Never Wave My Flag". The latter was performed by the group on The Tonight Show with Jay Leno on March 31, 2011.

Winans has been credited with providing music for the movie Jumping the Broom. He also wrote the second single, "Closer", for Bishop T.D. Jakes's Sacred Love Songs II album, performed by R&B singer Joe.

In 2011, Juan, along with Warryn Campbell, composed and produced the song "Marchin' On" and the disco-era remake "Dr. Love" for Jessica Reedy's debut album, From The Heart. He is also listed as a songwriter on the song "Best Man", from the Dawkins & Dawkins release From Now On, and Heavy D's "Put It All on Me", from the album Love Opus, singing background on the latter.

2012 began with another Campbell/Winans collaboration, writing and producing "You Should Know" for Essence Music Festival winner Greta Prince.

Juan is also featured as a songwriter on Beth Hart's new release, Bang Bang Boom Boom, co-writing the song "With You Everyday" with Hart. The album was released on April 2, 2013.

In 2022 and 2023, respectively, Juan co-wrote the Erica Campbell hit songs "Positive" and "Feel Alright". Both became Billboard number ones on the Gospel Airplay chart and yielded two consecutive Grammy Award nominations for Winans as a songwriter. The song Positive also won Juan his first NAACP Image Award as a songwriter for Outstanding Gospel/Christian Song.

The following year, 2024, Juan was back in the studio with the legendary Lalah Hathaway, Warryn Campbell, Eric Dawkins & Hip-Hop pioneer, MC Lyte. The team co-wrote and produced "Mood For You" for Hathaway's Grammy nominated "Vanta Black" album.

Winans was nominated again at the 67th Annual Grammy Awards in the Best Gospel Performance/Song category as a songwriter for DOE's "Holy Hands". He is also credited as a producer on the Contemporary Christian hit song.

As of 2025, Winans alongside his daughter, Sophia, launched the film production company, Watch Movies. The endeavor focuses on intergenerational storytelling that highlights the beautiful but complex realities of family dynamics, social justice, history and culture.

== Personal life ==
In September 2007, Winans married Contemporary Christian Music artist Lisa Kimmey, formerly of the award-winning singing group Out Of Eden. They share a child, Sophia, born in 2010. The couple separated in 2023 and subsequently divorced.

== Discography ==
- Erica Campbell (2023) Feel Alright (Blessed) (Composer)
- Erica Campbell (2022) Positive (Composer)
- Juan Winans (2022) Tell That feat. Mr. Talkbox (Artist/Composer)
- Juan Winans (2021) Never On My Own feat. Deborah Joy Winans (Artist/Composer)
- Juan Winans (2020) It Belongs To Me with Lisa Winans feat. Marvin Winans
- Juan & Lisa Winans (2019) A Little Soul For Christmas (Artist/Composer)
- Smokie Norful (2014) Love (Composer)
- Beth Hart (2012) With You Everyday (Composer)
- Q Parker (2012) The Manual (Composer)
- Tristan Wilds (2012) Remember, Remember EP, Cold/Composer, producer
- Heavy D (2011) Love Opus (Composer/Vocalist)
- Dawkins & Dawkins (2011) From Now On (Composer)
- Jessica Reedy (2011) From The Heart (Composer/Producer)
- T.D. Jakes (2011)Sacred Love Songs Vol. 2 Closer (Composer)
- Mary Mary (2011) Something Big (Composer)
- For Colored Girls: Music From and Inspired by the Original Motion Picture Soundtrack (2010) Sun (Composer)
- Michael Bolton (2009) One World One Love (Composer/Producer)
- Mary Mary (2008) The Sound/Composer
- Heavy D (2008) Vibes/Composer, Vocalist
- Marvin Winans (2007) Alone But Not Alone (Vocalist/Arranger)
- BeBe Winans (2007) Cherch (Vocalist)
- Matt Redman (2006) Beautiful News (Vocalist)
- Out of Eden (2006) Out of Eden: The Hits (Engineer/Vocal Producer)
- V Three (2006) V3 (Composer/Arranger)
- Kirk Whalum (2005) Songs of Babyface (Vocalist)
- BarlowGirl (2004) (BarlowGirl) (Vocalist)
- Michelle Williams (2004) Vocalist
- George Huff (2004) My Christmas EP (Vocalist/Arranger)
- Smokie Norful (2004) Nothing Without You (Vocalist)
- BeBe Winans (2003) My Christmas Prayer
- BeBe Winans (2002) Live & Up Close (Vocalist)
- Winans Phase 2 (1999) We Got Next (Artist/Composer)
