= Ain't No Need to Worry =

Single by the Winans featuring Anita Baker

from the album Decisions
- B-side: "Millions"
- Released: August 1987
- Recorded: 1987
- Genre: R&B; urban contemporary gospel
- Length: 4:12
- Label: Qwest Warner Bros.
- Songwriter(s): Marvin Winans
- Producer(s): Marvin Winans, Hadley Hockensmith

The Winans singles chronology
"Real Meaning of Christmas" (1986)	"Ain't No Need to Worry" (1987)	"Love Has No Color" (1987)

Anita Baker singles chronology
"No One in the World" (1987)	"Ain't No Need to Worry" (1987)	"Giving You the Best That I Got" (1988)

"Ain't No Need to Worry" is a song by American recording artists the Winans featuring Anita Baker. The song was released as the lead single of the Winans' fifth album, Decisions. "Ain't No Need to Worry" is a mixture of contemporary gospel and contemporary R&B. The single peaked at number 15 on the Billboard Hot Black Singles chart.

== Awards ==
The song won a Grammy in 1988 for Best Soul Gospel Performance by a Duo or Group, Choir or Chorus.

== Charts ==
Chart (1987)	Peak position
US Hot Black Singles (Billboard)	15
