= Angie & Debbie =

Angie & Debbie was a contemporary gospel music gospel duo, composed of siblings Angelique Winans-Caldwell and Debra Renee Winans-Lowe, members of the Winans family. Scoring minor success in the 1990s, the pair released two albums, including Bold which created controversy due to the inclusion of the song "Not Natural" and Angie & Debbie's conservative views on homosexuality.

In 1994, the duo were nominated for Best New Artist at the 1994 Soul Train Music Awards.

== Discography ==
- Angie & Debbie (1993)
- Bold (1997)
