= Derrick Rutledge =

American celebrity stylist and makeup artist, singer and entrepreneur

- Born: February 24, 1961 (age 65); Washington, DC

Derrick Edwin Rutledge (born February 24, 1961) is an American celebrity stylist and makeup artist, singer and entrepreneur. He is most notably makeup artist to Oprah Winfrey and First Lady Michelle Obama. Derrick was born and raised in Washington, DC. His early education was at the prestigious Georgetown Day School in Washington. After which he received a music and academic scholarship to Webster University in St. Louis. Rutledge returned to Washington in 1984 and began working as a makeup artist. He began his rise to prominence as a celebrity makeup artist when under the recommendation of former Miss USA and Real Housewives of Atlanta, Kenya Moore, he became her makeup artist at BET while she guest hosted Video Soul.. While at BET, Derrick Rutledge worked with many legendary divas of Black music and Hollywood. Including Chaka Khan, Patti Labelle, Pastor Shirley Caesar, Yolanda Adams, Beyoncé, and CeCe Winans.

His work has been featured on the covers of Essence Magazine, AARP, and Oprah Magazine. In September 2014, Mr. Rutledge was featured on Entertainment Tonight as part of the team creating a glamorous four cover shoot for the September issue of O! Magazine Derrick currently resides in his hometown of Washington, D.C.
