= Winans family =

Gospel music family

The Winans Family
- Origin: Detroit, Michigan, U.S.
- Genre: Gospel
- Years active: 1980s–present

The Winans family is an American family of gospel music artists from Detroit, Michigan.

== Family members ==
- David "Pop" Winans Sr. (father; b. April 20, 1934 – d. April 8, 2009)
- Delores "Mom" Winans (mother; b. September 22, 1936)
- David Winans II (oldest, sibling #1)–(b. September 24, 1954); married to Deborah Ann Coduto-Winans II (b. August 23, 1956; d. December 2007). Children: daughter, Seven Simone Winans.
- Ronald Winans (sibling #2) (b. June 30, 1956; d. June 17, 2005)
- Carvin Winans (sibling #3 twin)–(March 5, 1958); is married to Chérie Winans; children Carvin Winans Jr.; Juan; Deborah Joy; Ian Winans; Shanniah Winans; and Laylah Winans
- Marvin Winans (sibling #4 twin)–(March 5, 1958); was married to Vickie; children: Marvin Jr; Mario (stepson) and Josiah
- Michael Winans Sr. (sibling #5) (b. June 5, 1959) married to Regina; children: Mike (Michael Jr); LaShay
- Daniel Winans (sibling #6) (b. July 22, 1961) married to Sybil; children: Daniel Jr; Jeremy; Kacy
- Benjamin "BeBe" Winans Sr. (sibling #7) (b. September 17, 1962); formerly married to Debra Johnson; Children: Miya D. Winans and Benjamin Winans Jr.
- Priscilla "CeCe" Winans (sibling #8) (b. October 8, 1964) married: Alvin Love Jr; children: Ashley; Alvin Love III.
- Angelique Winans-Caldwell (sibling #9) (b. March 4, 1968) – married: Cedric Caldwell; Children: Ryan, Jalon and Jade
- Debra Renee Winans-Lowe (sibling #10) (b. September 3, 1972) – married: James Lowe; Children: James Jr., Jayson and Jackson

== Recording artists and groups within the family ==
=== Mom and Pop Winans ===
Delores and David Winans recorded together as "Mom and Pop Winans" and separately at various times as "Mom", "Delores", "Pop", or "David". They received a Grammy nomination for their CD Mom & Pop Winans in 1989. Delores is currently signed to daughter CeCe's label PureSprings Gospel. Delores and David met while in the Lucille Lemon Choir conducted by Lucille Lemon. They organized yearly Christmas concerts at Mercy Hall in which their ten children participated.

=== The Winans ===
Brothers Ronald, Carvin, Marvin, and Michael Winans, the second, third, fourth and fifth siblings, are known professionally as The Winans. They were discovered by Andrae Crouch, who signed them to Light Records. Their first record, Introducing The Winans was produced in 1981. Their style was noted for its crossover efforts and received airplay on R&B radio. The group's last recording was in 1995. They have subsequently been involved in various Winans family projects where they are credited as "The Winans", e.g. November 2000's Christmas: Our Gifts To You.

=== David Winans II ===
David Winans II is an instrumentalist, first as bassist for "The Winanaires", the earliest version of the Winans as a gospel quartet, before they became "The Testimonial Singers". While they were the "Testimonial Singers", David switched to guitars. After the change to "The Winans", David continued to play guitar under the production of Bill Maxwell, and then Quincy Jones' label Qwest records for the Grammy award-winning "Let My People Go" album. David also has solo Christian rock projects, Xairia, DWP, and more recently, David Winans' pi.

With the group pi in existence David has won 10 Detroit Music Awards for Outstanding Songwriter, Outstanding Instrumentalist and Outstanding Performance. He won Outstanding Instrumentalist with his premiere recording with Righteous Through God. And most recently 3 Detroit Music Awards for the song, "Will You Bring Me There Again" which he collaborated with Joya Koch, on lyrics. He was married to Deborah Ann Coduto Winans. She died due to illness in 2007. They had a daughter, Seven Simone.

==== Ron Winans Family & Friends ====
In addition to his involvement with The Winans, Ron released a solo album in the late 1980s on the EMI Gospel label, and recorded a series of five CDs, Ron Winans Family & Friends. He co-founded, with Gladys Knight, the Gladys and Ron's Chicken & Waffles restaurant chain. Ronald Winans died in 2005.

==== Carvin Winans ====
Carvin is a member of the Winans with his brothers. During his first five years with the Winans, Carvin wrote for the project and began producing some of their albums. In 1987, as part of the Winans, he was a backing vocalist on Michael Jackson's Bad.

In 2002, Carvin performed on a sold out world tour with the Winans family in front of millions of fans which closed out in Detroit at the Fox Theatre. In October 2007 he was inducted in the Gospel Music Hall of Fame in Nashville Tennessee, along with his brothers. In June 2008, Carvin received the President's Merit Award from the Recording Academy in recognition of his extraordinary gifts as a passionate singer, performer, expressive communicator, and pioneer of contemporary gospel music.

He has 5 Grammy's and 3 Gold Records, several NAACP Awards and Soul Train Awards after 45 years in the business. He worked with such greats as Michael Jackson, Stevie Wonder, Quincy Jones, Whitney Houston, Peabo Bryson, Kenny Loggins, Brian McKnight, Michael McDonald and Anita Baker, just to name a few. In 2019, he released his first solo debut album In The Softest Way, which featured production himself alongside Jimmy Jam and Terry Lewis. Album singles include "Once In A Lifetime", "A Little Love", and "Misunderstood". His 2nd studio album-Cool Gospel was released on June 27, 2025 via Blackground Records 2.0 with the lead single "God's Still Working On Me" which later became his 1st solo No. 1 Gospel hit record on Billboard Gospel Airplay Charts.

==== Marvin Winans ====
Marvin Winans has focused on work as the pastor of Perfecting Church in Detroit, where he continues to record albums with the church's choir, under the name Marvin Winans and the Perfected Praise Choir. Marvin, along with Delores ("Mom") and nephew Alvin Love III (sister CeCe's son), signed to CeCe's record label PureSprings Gospel. PureSprings Gospel released Marvin's album Alone But Not Alone in September 2007. He founded the Marvin L. Winans Academy of Performing Arts, which opened in 1997.

==== Michael and Regina Winans ====
Michael Winans has performed and released several recordings with wife Regina, including the independent album Be Yourself. The album featured background vocals provided by their children Mike (Michael Jr) and LaShay. Their third CD was released in January 2008.

==== Daniel Winans ====
Born in Detroit, Michigan, Daniel Winans is the sixth sibling. Daniel won his own Grammy Award for Best Soul Gospel Performance by a Duo or Group, Choir or Chorus and is a three-time Grammy nominee.

===== Discography =====
- 1987: Daniel & Second Half
- 1989: Brotherly Love (won Grammy for the title cut)
- 1991: My Point of View
- 1994: Not in My House
- 2011: First Love; guest appearance by Andrae' Crouch on the remake of Crouch's "Jesus Is The Answer"
- 2014: Family (Danz Music Productions/BMI/BMG teams up with MCRi Music Distribution)

=== BeBe & CeCe Winans ===
Youngest brother and seventh sibling Benjamin (BeBe Winans) recorded with younger sister and eighth sibling Priscilla (CeCe Winans) as BeBe & CeCe Winans. Premiering as background vocalists for Andrae Crouch in the 70s, BeBe & CeCe became singers for the PTL Club at Heritage USA in Charlotte, NC. Leaders at The PTL gave BeBe & CeCe a song to sing together, called "Up Where We Belong" from the 1982 movie An Officer and a Gentleman. Adding a gospel twist, the name and lyrics were changed to "Lord Lift Us Up (Where We Belong)".

After singing that song on the popular Christian television show, BeBe & CeCe were requested to sing on television shows, at conferences and in award shows. The two became a duo, releasing their first album in 1984. They have collaborated with greats such as their best friend, Whitney Houston.

In 1991, they released their album Different Lifestyles, through Sparrow, which included the hits "Addictive Love" and "It's O.K." Both Bebe and Cece subsequently recorded as solo acts, and have established solo careers. CeCe is the best-selling gospel artist of all time, with 15 Grammys and a host of other awards. She founded the PureSprings Gospel label, which has signed a number of artists, including family members: Delores ("Mom") Winans, Marvin Winans, and CeCe's son, Alvin Love III.

=== Angie and Debbie Winans ===
Sisters Angie and Debbie Winans are the ninth and tenth of the siblings, and are the youngest members of the family. In 1990 they co-wrote and performed a smooth jazz song called "Be With You" for GospelJazz pioneer, Ben Tankard on his "Keynote Speaker" album. The song went #1 on secular radio.

Their first album, "Angie and Debbie", was released in 1993 on Capitol Records. It included "Light of Love", which featured pop diva Whitney Houston on background vocals. Stephanie Mills was featured on background vocals on the song "Father, Father". Their second album, Bold (1997), contained the song "Not Natural", a song denouncing homosexuality. This led to protests by GLAAD. Angie Winans released a solo project in 2001, Melodies of My Heart. Debbie Winans later released a children's album.

=== Winans Phase 2 ===
Winans Phase 2 was formed in 1998 and recorded on Myrrh Records. It consists of Marvin Winans Jr., Carvin Winans Jr., Michael Winans Jr., and Juan Winans, the son of Carvin Sr.. Marvin Jr. started a production company called M2 Entertainment and produced songs for his mother Vickie Winans' album Woman To Woman. He released a solo album, Image of a Man.

They released an album in 1999 called We Got Next. Michael Winans Jr. signed with Sean "Diddy" Combs, writing and producing for some of the biggest artists, including Chris Brown, New Edition, Case, Michelle Williams, Mario Winans, Danity Kane and Diddy himself. He was scheduled to release his album titled "My Own Genre" in March 2011.

=== 3 Winans Brothers ===
3 Winans Brothers is a Winans brothers supergroup, formed in 2013 with Carvin Winans, Marvin Winans, and BeBe Winans. In September 2013, the lead single from the upcoming album "If God Be For Us" was released worldwide. The second single "Move In Me" was released July 2, 2014. The debut album release of Foreign Land was on September 30, 2014, on Entertainment One Music/BMG/Regimen Records. On October 14, 2014 the album debuted #2 on Billboard Top 10 Gospel Charts.

=== Vickie Winans ===
Vickie Winans is the former wife of Marvin and a solo artist. She was also raised in a musical family in Detroit. Her debut solo album in 1987 was titled Be Encouraged.

=== Mario Winans ===
Mario Winans is a solo R&B singer who is affiliated with Sean "Diddy" Combs. He is best known for his 2004 single "I Don't Wanna Know." He is the son of Vickie Winans and Ronald Brown, and took the Winans name after Vickie married Marvin Winans in the late 1970s.

=== Marvin Winans Jr ===
Marvin Winans Jr, like his brother, is a solo gospel artist. He is the son of Vickie Winans and Marvin Winans.

=== Juan Winans ===
Juan Winans is a Grammy-nominated singer/songwriter. He has written for Warryn Campbell, George Huff, Joe, Lalah Hathaway, Tyler Perry, and Boyz II Men.

== Television ==
On December 24, 1990, the family appeared on The Oprah Winfrey Show. Family members on the show included Ronald, Carvin, Marvin, and Michael (as "The Winans"), BeBe & CeCe (as a duo), Vickie, Mom and Pop, Daniel, David, Angie, and Debbie. On June 27, 1992 the family appeared on The Arsenio Hall Show.

Deborah Joy Winans played Charity Greenleaf for five seasons on OWN's drama series Greenleaf.

On March 2, 2021, Marvin's son Marvin Winans, Jr. appeared as a contestant on Wheel of Fortune.

== See also ==
- List of entertainment industry dynasties
