= New Hope Baptist Church (Newark) =

Coordinates: 40°44′46″N 74°10′47″W

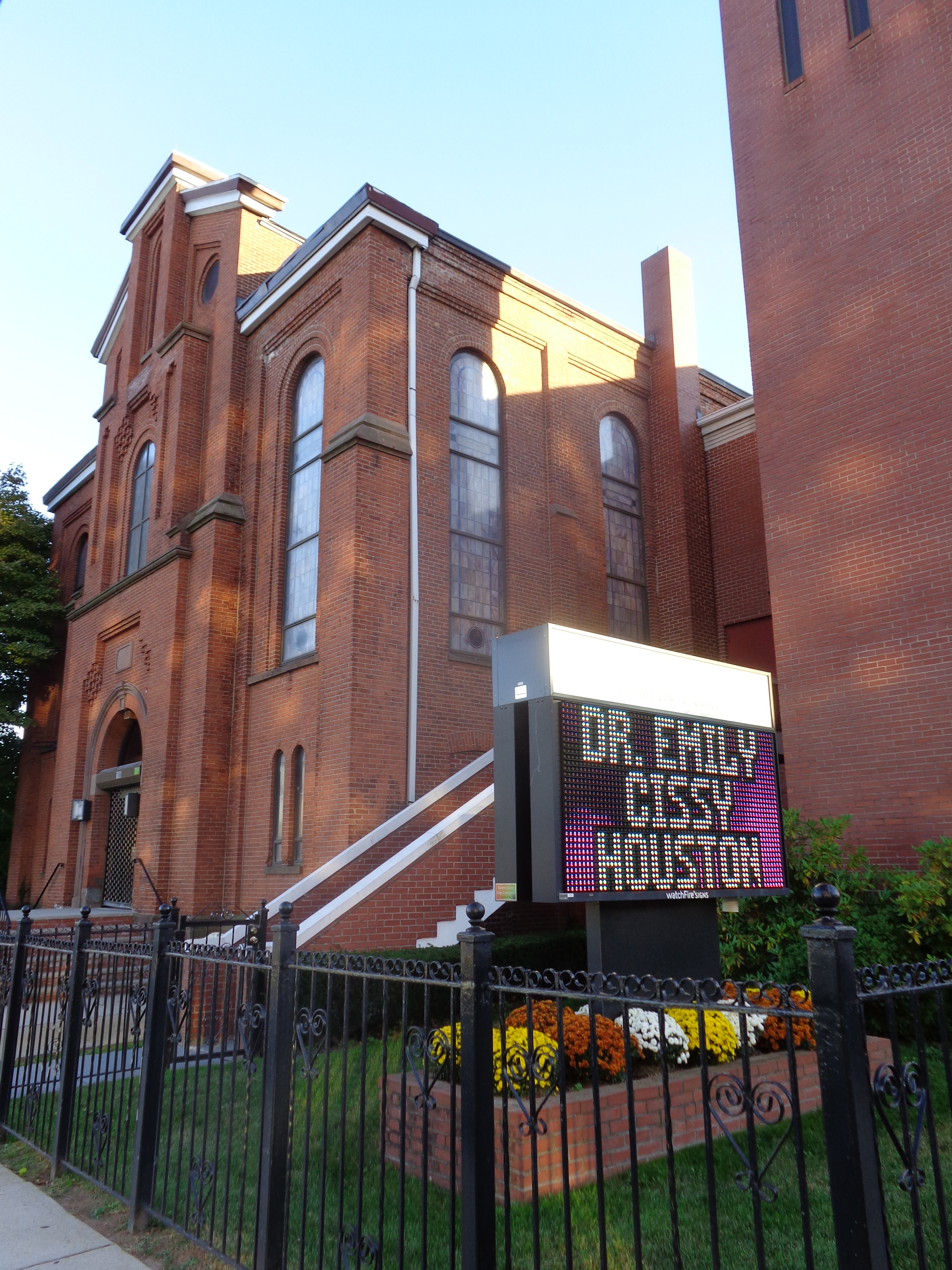
- New Hope Baptist Church
- Location: 106 Sussex Ave, Newark, NJ 07103
- Country: United States
- Denomination: Baptist
- Website: www.newhopenewark.org

History
- Founded: June 2, 1903
- Founder(s): Addie Vine; Maggie Vine

New Hope Baptist Church is a Baptist church in Newark, New Jersey, located at 106 Sussex Avenue in University Heights. It is affiliated with the National Baptist Convention, USA.

== History ==
New Hope began its services as a "mission" in the home of Addie and Maggie Vine. The church organized on June 2, 1903, by the small but growing African-American community in Newark and incorporated on May 1, 1918.

Famous members of the congregation include late pop/R&B singer Whitney Houston, who grew up attending the church and singing in the choir, as well as her cousins Dionne and Dee Dee Warwick. Whitney's mother Cissy Houston was also a lifelong active member of the congregation, and served on the Deaconess Board.

A group of teenagers who sang in the James M. Baxter Terrace Housing Projects recreation hall and who members of the church choir went on to become the Monotones, a doo-wop group.

== Events ==
In 2010, Cory Booker kicked off his Newark mayoral re-election bid at the church. Cissy Houston has long been a musical influence on the church. Funeral services for Whitney Houston, a lifelong member of the congregation, were held at the New Hope Baptist Church. NJ Governor Chris Christie began his inauguration activities at the church in 2009 and 2014. In 2024, Cissy Houston’s funeral was held at the church.

== See also ==
- The Drinkard Singers
- McDonald's Gospelfest
