= New Hope Baptist Church (Chickasha, Oklahoma) =

Historic church in Oklahoma, United States

- U.S. National Register of Historic Places
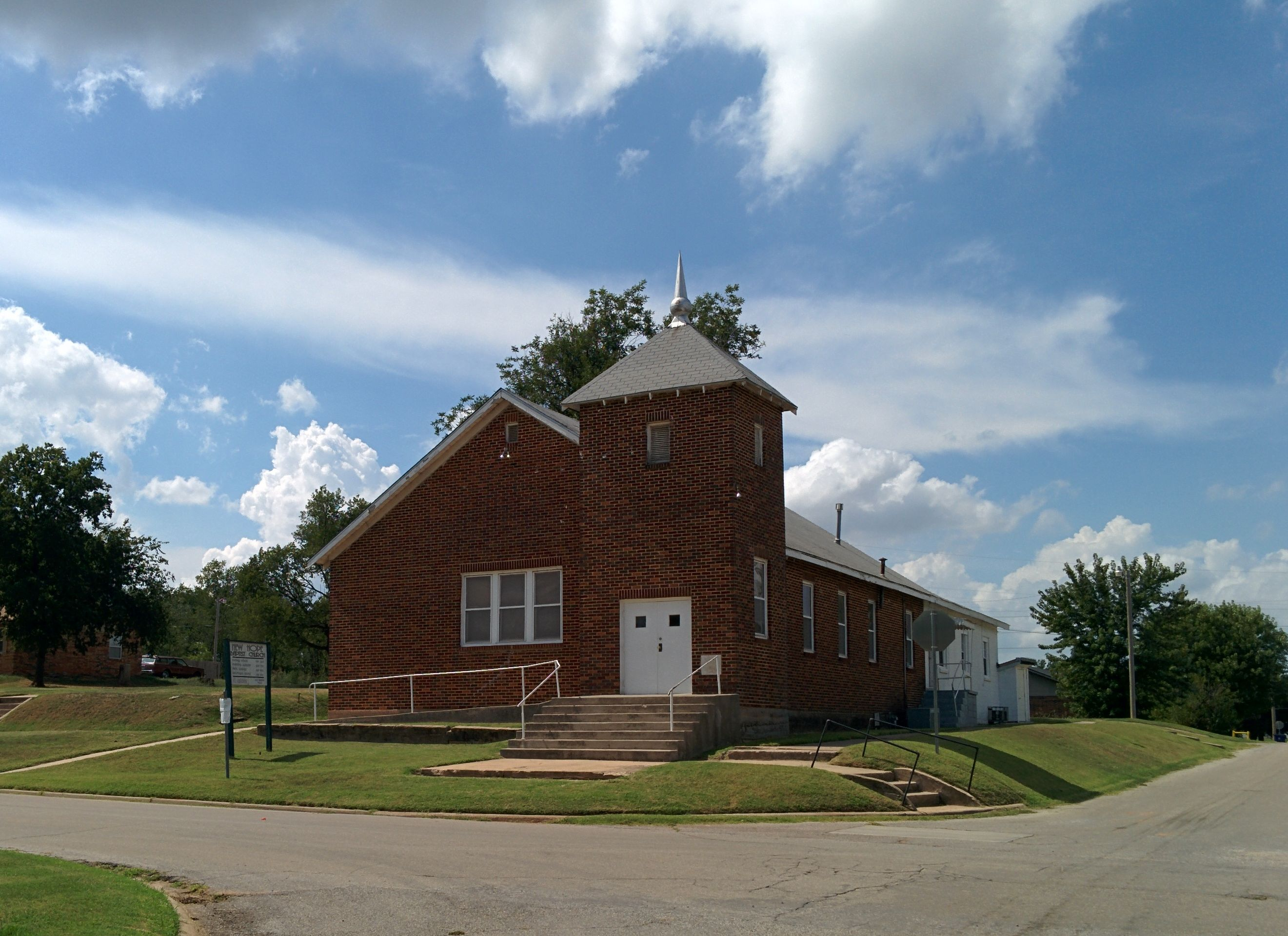
- New Hope Baptist Church, Chickasha, OK

- Location within Oklahoma Location within the United States
- Location: 1202 S. Sheppard St., Chickasha, Oklahoma
- Coordinates: 35.0389°N 97.9313°W
- Area: less than one acre
- Built: 1939, c.1948
- NRHP reference No.: 03000515
- Added to NRHP: June 5, 2003

The New Hope Baptist Church at 1202 S. Sheppard Street in Chickasha, Oklahoma is a historic Baptist church building. It was built in 1939 and added to the National Register in 2003.

Its building is a one-story east-facing front-gabled red brick building and has a square corner tower. It has a concrete block education wing with a basement which was added at the rear in about 1948.

It was deemed significant for its association with the growth and development of the African American community in Chickasha. According to its NRHP nomination "It stands as the best extant symbol of African American socio-political unity in Chickasha during a period when de facto and de jure segregation alienated blacks from the greater social institutions of Chickasha. An entire black community, alive with homes, businesses, churches, and social clubs developed in Chickasha. This community, while by necessity interacting with the larger city in which it thrived, was for the most part an entity unto itself, lacking only an official political voice. The glue that held this community together was the church. Denominational and doctrinal differences aside, the black churches of Chickasha provided the spiritual, educational, social, and political voice of the community."
