= Doc McKenzie =

American gospel musician (born 1949)

- Also known as: Doc McKenzie
- Born: Milbert E.S. McKenzie; April 29, 1949 (age 77); Olanta, South Carolina
- Origin: Lake City, South Carolina
- Genres: CCM, gospel, traditional black gospel, urban contemporary gospel, Christian country music
- Occupations: Singer, songwriter
- Instruments: Vocals, singer-songwriter
- Years active: 1990–present
- Labels: Atlanta International, Savoy, Meltone, First Lite, MCG, New Haven, Ophir
- Website: docmckenzieandthehilites.com

Milbert E.S. McKenzie (born April 29, 1949), who goes by the stage name Doc McKenzie, is an American gospel musician. He started his music career in 1990, and released six albums, which were released by Atlanta International Records, Savoy Records, and Meltone Records. Milbert released three albums of note, Ride with Jesus in 1996 with First Lite Records, 1998's Live, also with First Lite, and 2009's Renewed with Ophir Records, all of which charted on the Billboard magazine charts, exclusively on the Gospel Albums chart.

== Early life ==
Milbert was born on April 29, 1949, in Olanta, South Carolina, the son of Leroy and Cora McKenzie, who were farmers. The family attended St. Mark's Holiness Church in Lake City, South Carolina. His pastor at the time, Bishop, R. C. Eaddy, gave him his moniker "Doc" because he could fix anything. He started leading his church choir at the age of six. The Hi-Lites were started by his sister Beronzy McKenzie, and his cousin Handy McFadden, and they relocated to Paterson, New Jersey, for a time during the 1960s and 1970s, moving back home in the mid-1980s to begin their musical recording careers.

== Music career ==
Milbert began his recording career in 1990, with the release of six albums by three labels, Atlanta International Records, Savoy Records, and Meltone Records. He released Ride with Jesus on October 22, 1996, with First Lite Records, and this was the breakthrough release on the Billboard magazine Gospel Albums chart at No. 28. The musician release, Live, on September 15, 1998, by First Lite Records, and this charted on the aforementioned chart at No. 21. His next album to chart, Renewed, was released by Ophir Records on September 1, 2009, and this placed at No. 14 on the Gospel Albums chart.

== Discography ==
List of selected studio albums, with selected chart positions
Title	Album details	Peak chart positions
Title	Album details	US Gos
Ride with Jesus	Released: October 22, 1996; Label: First Lite; CD, digital download	28
Live	Released: September 15, 1998; Label: First Lite; CD, digital download	21
Renewed	Released: September 1, 2009; Label: Ophir; CD, digital download	14
