= James M. Baxter Terrace =

James M. Baxter Terrace Housing Projects
- Interactive map of the James M. Baxter Terrace Housing Projects area
- Alternative names: Baxter Terrace

General information
- Status: Closed
- Location: Newark, New Jersey
- Coordinates: 40.74778°N 74.17897°W
- Opened: 1941
- Demolished: 2009

The James M. Baxter Terrace was a public housing complex in Newark, New Jersey. Named after James M. Baxter, it was opened in 1941. It was closed and demolished in 2009 due to social and financial neglect. The housing was partially replaced in 2012 by 90 apartments known by the name of Baxter Park.

== Origins ==
Under the Federal Housing Act, the Newark Housing Authority was created in 1937. The Housing Authority was tasked with creating affordable housing for low income residents. When the first contracts were signed between the Federal Housing Authority and the city of Newark, Baxter Terrace was among the first projects to be built. The complex was named after James M. Baxter, the principal of the first high school for Black students in Newark.

== Years in operation ==
One of the first public housing facilities in the United States, Baxter Terrace was open for 68 years. Through the 1950s, Baxter Terrace remained the only majority Black housing project in Newark. The 14 acres of housing was informally segregated, with Black people living on one end, and whites on the other.

Many early residents took pride in the community, with one father being cited as writing a theme song for it.

A group of teenagers who sang in the Baxter Terrace recreation hall went on to become the Monotones, a doo-wop group.

== Closure and legacy ==
Baxter Terrace was closed and demolished in 2009 and replaced by Baxter Park in 2012. Baxter Park became more focused on having mixed incomes rather than focusing specifically on housing low income people. Former residents of Baxter Terrace have held reunions.

The façade of Baxter Terrace was preserved in demolition, with parts being brought to and displayed at the Smithsonian National Museum of African American History and Culture.
