= Jessica Reedy =

American gospel singer and songwriter (born 1988)

Jessica Lee Reedy
- Born: July 12, 1988 (age 38); Saginaw, Michigan, U.S.
- Genres: Gospel
- Occupations: Singer, songwriter
- Years active: 2009–present
- Labels: Light, Purity

Jessica Reedy (born July 12, 1988) is an American gospel singer and songwriter who is best known as the runner-up on BET's gospel singing competition Sunday Best (season 2) in 2009.

== Career ==
Reedy's debut album, From The Heart was released on September 27, 2011. The album debuted at No. 1 on the Billboard Gospel Album Chart. The album was received positively by reviewers including Jon Caramanica of the New York Times, who called it "mature and thoughtful".

Reedy's second album, Transparent was released on November 14, 2014. The album debuted at No. 5 on the Billboard Gospel Albums Chart. In 2015, Reedy won a Stellar Award.

== Discography ==
=== Studio albums ===
List of studio albums, with selected chart positions
Title	Album details	Peak chart positions			
Title	Album details	US	US Gospel	US Ind.	US christ/ gosp
From the Heart	Released: September 27, 2011; Label: Light Records, eOne Music; Format: CD, digital download	43	1	5	4
Transparent	Released: November 11, 2014; Label: Purity Records; Format: CD, digital download	—	5	47	28
you can't hold me down	released : February 28,2019 Format:CD, digital download	-	5	_	29
"—" denotes releases that did not chart or were not released in that territory.

=== Live albums ===
- Light Records Unplugged (2013) – Light Records

=== Singles ===
Title	Year	Peak chart position				Album
Title	Year	US GOSP	US dig Gosp	US Gosp airplay	US R&B/HH	Album
"Put It On the Altar"	2011	6	14	—	55	From the Heart
"God Had Smiled On Me"	2011	27	21	—	—	From the Heart
"Something Out of Nothing"	2012	—	—	—	—	From the Heart
"Grace"	2014	22	—	18	—	Transparent
"Better"	2014	—	8	16	—	Transparent
"Flow"	2015	—	18	—	—	Transparent

== Films ==
- 2014 : Who Can I Run To : Tracy

== Television appearances ==
- Black Girls Rock (2014)
- Bobby Jones Gospel (2014)
- Celebration of Gospel (2016,2013, 2012, 2011)
- Pre-Stellar Awards (2013, 2014)
- Stellar Gospel Awards (2012, 2011, 2010)
- Word Network (2013, 2012)
- TBN (2012)
- BET Awards (2012)
- BET's 106 & Park (2012 - debuted music video "Something Out of Nothing")
- Sheryl Lee Ralph's Divas Simply Singing (2011)
- TCT Network (2012, 2011)
- BET's Lift Every Voice (2011)
