= Clint Brown (musician) =

American gospel musician

- Also known as: Bishop Clint S. Brown
- Born: Clint Steven Brown; April 29, 1963 (age 63); Iota, Louisiana
- Origin: Windermere, Florida
- Genres: CCM, gospel, Praise & Worship
- Occupations: Singer, songwriter, pastor, minister
- Instruments: Vocals, singer-songwriter, piano
- Years active: 2012–present
- Labels: Tribe, Habakkuk, Judah, Daywind
- Website: clintbrown.com

Bishop Clint Steven Brown (born April 29, 1963) is an American gospel musician and pastor.

== Early life ==
Brown was born in Iota, Louisiana on April 29, 1963, as Clint Steven Brown. Brown grew up in the United Pentecostal Church (UPCI) and from a very young age began to play the piano for Sunday services. After services in his home church would conclude, Brown would sneak across town to the local Church Of God In Christ congregation. “I’d be the only white boy in the building.” Brown has said on many occasions. His experience with the Black Church would play a vital role in his music. He learned how to play the trumpet while in his middle and high school band. His father tried unsuccessfully to get him to work as a mechanic, instead he opted for a career in music. Not long after his decision to pursue music ministry, Brown was hired by several different ministries as a music director, until 1985 when he was hired to travel full time with Televangelist Mike Murdock. However, Brown was never personally given an opportunity to sing on stage in any of Murdock’s meetings.

== Music career ==
His music recording career commenced in the early 1990’s with albums produced by World Harvest Church such as “Joshua People Volumes 1 & 2.” These albums featured Brown leading the singers, musicians, and choir in Praise & Worship. Many of the songs on those albums were written by Brown and were primarily based on the sermons preached by Pastor Rod Parsley each week. After leaving World Harvest, Brown continued to pursue his recording career. His first album after beginning his church, Clint Brown later released as A Night Of Destiny was released in 1995. His next album Live from Orlando was released in 1998 through his personal label Tribe Records. He has released over twenty albums, primarily with Tribe Records, yet releasing one album each with Habakkuk Music, Judah Music, and Daywind Music. The first album to chart, One Nation Under Praise, was released on September 11, 2002, and this placed at a peak of No. 4 on the Billboard magazine Christian Albums chart. His second album to chart, Fall Like Rain, was released on February 26, 2008, by Tribe Records, which this was his most charted release, and it placed on four Billboard magazine charts; on the Billboard 200 at No. 197, Christian Albums at No. 18, Gospel Albums at No. 7, and Independent Albums at No. 25. The third album to chart, Release, was released on April 3, 2012, by Habakkuk Music, and this placed at a peak of No. 30 on the Gospel Albums chart.

== Personal life ==
Brown is married to Kendal, and they reside in Windermere, Florida, with their children.

== Discography ==
List of selected studio albums, with selected chart positions
Title	Album details	Peak chart positions			
Title	Album details	US	US Chr	US Gos	US Ind
One Nation Under Praise	Released: September 11, 2002; Label: Tribe; CD, digital download	–	4	–	–
Fall Like Rain	Released: February 26, 2008; Label: Tribe; CD, digital download	197	18	7	25
Release	Released: April 3, 2012; Label: Habakkuk; CD, digital download	–	–	30	–
