= Vickie Winans =

American gospel singer (born 1953)

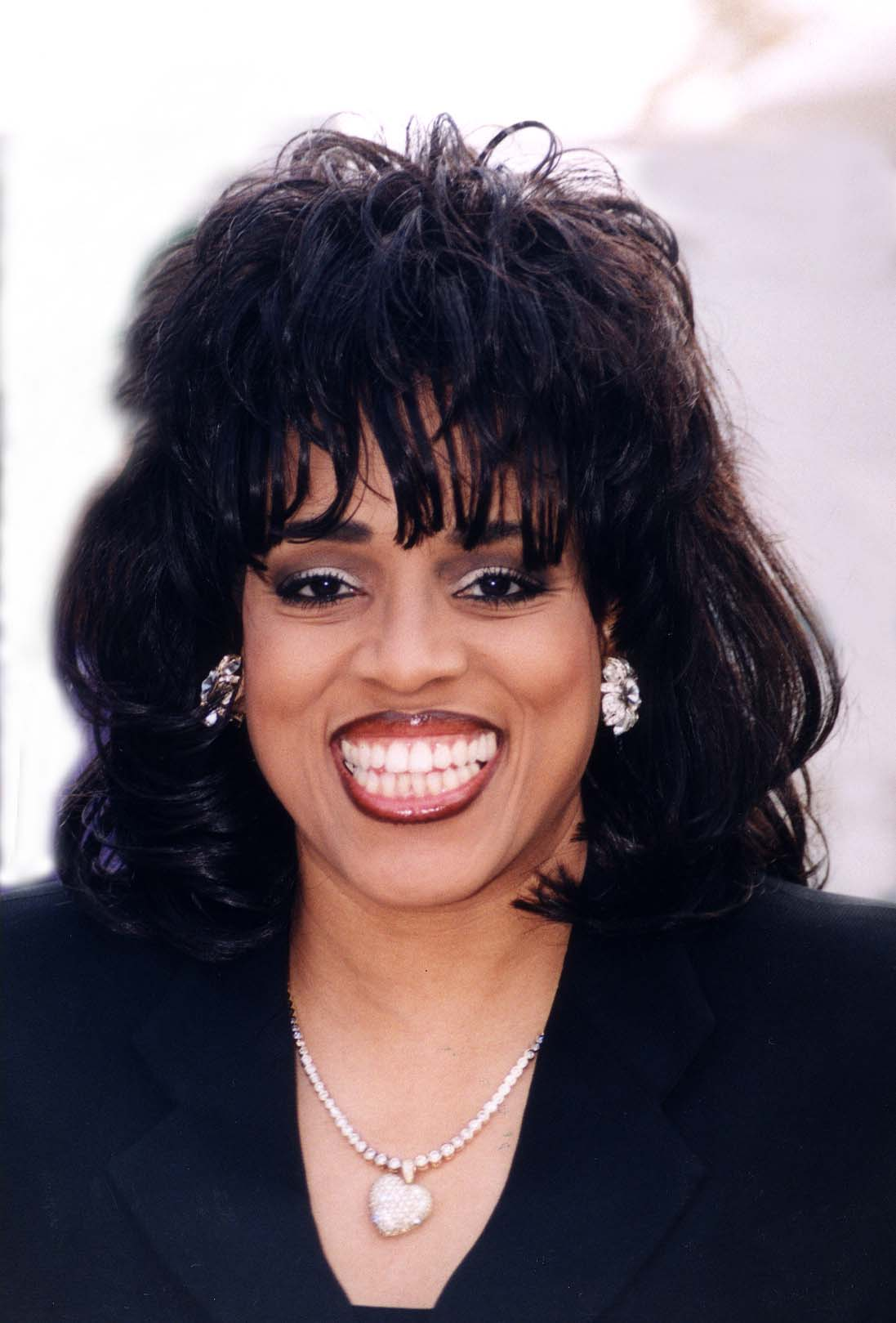
- Winans in 2000

Background information
- Born: Viviane Bowman; October 18, 1953 (age 72)
- Origin: Michigan, U.S.
- Genres: Gospel
- Occupations: Singer; songwriter; actress; comedian
- Years active: 1985–present
- Labels: Destiny Joy Records; Light; MCA, CGI; Intersound; Verity
- Website: http://www.vickiewinans.com

Vickie Winans (born Viviane Bowman; October 18, 1953) is an American singer-songwriter, music producer, comedian, and actress. In 1985, she released her debut album Be Encouraged on Light Records. She departed from Light Records after her second album Total Victory (1989) was less successful than its predecessor. Her third album, The Lady (1991), was met with controversy due to its more contemporary sound. In 1994, Winans released her fourth album Vickie Winans on Intersound Records. Her career breakthrough came with the release of her live album, Live in Detroit (1997), which spawned the gospel hit "Long as I Got King Jesus". Her success continued with the release of her second live album, Live in Detroit II (1999).

After a four-year hiatus, Winans returned with her fifth studio album Bringing It All Together (2003). The album spent nine weeks at number one on Billboard's Top Gospel Albums chart, fueled by the album's lead single "Shake Yourself Loose". She followed that with her sixth album Woman to Woman: Songs of Life (2006), which also peaked at number one on the Top Gospel Albums chart. In 2007, she formed her own record label, Destiny Joy Records. She released two more albums on her record label, Happy Holidays (2007) and How I Got Over (2009), the latter of which also peaked at number one on the Top Gospel Albums chart.

Winans has earned eight Stellar Awards and been nominated for seven Grammy Awards. Her contributions and work in gospel music have credited her as 'The Hardest Working Woman in Gospel Music'.

== Early life ==
Viviane Bowman was born on October 18, 1953, in Detroit, Michigan, to Mattie Bowman, and Aaron Bowman, a contractor and carpenter. She has eleven other siblings. At age eight, Winans became a member of the choir at International Gospel Center. She formed a short-lived gospel group called International Sounds of Deliverance during her teenage years.

== Career ==
=== 1987–1993: Career beginnings ===
Winans released her debut studio album Be Encouraged on July 31, 1987, Light Records. The album peaked at number three on Billboard's Top Spiritual Albums chart. The album spawn the singles "We Shall Behold Him" and "First Trumpet Sound". Be Encouraged was nominated for Best Soul Gospel Performance, Female at the 30th Annual Grammy Awards in 1988. The album was also nominated for Album of the Year at the 3rd Annual Stellar Awards in 1988. In 1989, she released her second album Total Victory. The album was considered less commercially successful due to Light Records experiencing financial problems. Despite the label's financial setbacks, Total Victory was nominated for Best Soul Gospel Vocal Performance, Male, Female at the 32nd Annual Grammy Awards in 1990. Shortly after, Winans left Light Records. In April 1989, she appeared the musical lead in the Broadway production Don't Get God Started.

In 1990, Winans signed a recording contract with Geffen Records. Winans' recording contract was eventually bought out by MCA Records when Geffen folded into MCA Records. During the recording of her third album, Winans was pushed to refrain from using the name Jesus in the songs in order to appeal to wider audience. In 1991, she released her third studio album The Lady. The album, which featured production by her then-husband Marvin Winans and son Mario Winans, spawned the single "Don't Throw Your Life Away". She performed the song at the annual Stellar Awards in 1991. The performance and its use of backup dancers received controversy, ultimately resulting in radio stations refusing to play her music. The controversy led to Winans issuing a public apology. Despite The Lady earning a Grammy Award nomination for Best Contemporary Soul Gospel Album at the 35th Annual Grammy Awards in 1993, Winans was dropped from MCA Records. In September 1991, Winans starred in the gospel musical stage production The First Lady.

=== 1994–2000: Career breakthrough ===
On August 16, 1994, Winans released fourth studio self-titled album Vickie Winans on Intersound Records, which peaked at number ten on the Top Gospel Albums chart. To further promote the album, Winans filmed a music video for the album's lead single "Work It Out". In November 1996, Winans was moved from Intersound Records to Platinum Entertainment when the company folded due to financial issues. Platinum Entertainment moved Winans to their subsidiary label CGI Records (Chicago Gospel International). The roster move to CGI Records resulted in a five-album deal with the record label. Winans' career breakthrough came with the release of her first live album Live in Detroit in June 1997. The album's lead single "Long as I Got King Jesus" became a success on gospel radio stations. Live in Detroit peaked at number ten on the Top Gospel Albums chart and earned a nomination for Best Traditional Soul Gospel Album at the 40th Annual Grammy Awards in 1998.

In April 1999, she released her second live album Live in Detroit II, which peaked at number three on Top Gospel Albums chart. The album became her highest-selling debut in album sales, selling over 112,000 copies within the first month of its release. Live in Detroit II won a Stellar Award for Traditional Album of the Year, Traditional Female Artist of the Year, and Best Female Artist at the 15th Annual Stellar Awards in 2000. The live album also earned another nomination for Best Traditional Soul Gospel Album at the 42nd Annual Grammy Awards in 2000.

Shortly after the release of her live comedy album Share the Laughter in July 1999, CGI's parent company Platinum Entertainment experienced financial problems. The label originally planned for Winans to release three albums during the year of 1999 but the third installment Woman to Woman was ultimately shelved. The company closed its distribution subsidiary in June 2000, and was forced to declare bankruptcy in July.

=== 2002–2006: Bringing It All Together and Woman to Woman: Songs of Life ===
In May 2002, she embarked on the McDonald's Gospelfest Tour alongside Hezekiah Walker, Cissy Houston, Virtue, and Desiree Coleman. After a four-year hiatus, she released her fifth studio album Bringing It All Together on Verity Records in May 2003. The album became her first number one album on Billboard's Top Gospel Albums chart, spending a total of nine weeks atop of the chart. She released "Shake Yourself Loose" as the album's lead which was successful on a gospel radio airplay. She won Artist of the Year, Female Artist of the Year, Contemporary Female Artist of the Year, and Music Video of the Year for the song "Shook" during the 19th Annual Stellar Awards. Bringing It All Together also received a nomination for Best Contemporary Soul Gospel Album at the 46th Annual Grammy Awards in 2004. She also earned a nomination for Best Gospel Artist at 2004 BET Awards. In 2004, Winans wrote and starred in her own stage play Torn Between Two Loves.

In 2005, Winans headlined the Rising Star Tour, sponsored by Chrysler Financial. In January 2006, she hosted the 21st Annual Stellar Awards alongside Donnie McClurkin and Israel Houghton. She released her sixth album Woman to Woman: Songs of Life on August 8, 2006, which became her second album peak atop of Top Gospel Albums chart. The album's lead single "It's Alright" peaked at number two on the US Hot Gospel Songs chart.

=== 2007–present: How I Got Over ===
On October 2, 2007, she released her seventh album Happy Holidays. Her eighth studio album How I Got Over was released on August 4, 2009, which peaked at number one on Top Gospel Albums chart. The titled-track was released as the lead single and peaked at number eight on the US Hot Gospel Songs chart. She received a nomination for Best Traditional Gospel Album at 52nd Annual Grammy Awards in 2010. In January 2010, Winans hosted BET comedy series called BET Gospel Comic View A Time to Laugh, although the series never aired.

== Business and ventures ==
=== Viviane, Inc. ===
In 1994, Winans founded her own management and publishing company Viviane, Inc. The company served as an umbrella for Winans' music publishing, booking and management services.

=== Destiny Joy Records ===
In 2005, Winans founded her own recording label Destiny Joy Records which formed as an imprint based from Verity Records. The label's name is derived from Winans' daughter that was lost due to a miscarriage five months into the pregnancy. With headquarters in West Bloomfield, the company serves as an umbrella for the singer's various brands in music, videos, and films. Destiny Joy Records' first production was Happy Holidays (2007), a holiday album by Winans. In 2008, the company ventured into film production and released a fitness film titled Laugh While You Lose, which featured fitness instructor Kiersten Lane. The company has distributed Winans' other albums such as her reissue of her sixth album Woman to Woman (2006), How I Got Over (2009), and B.K. Douglas and More Than Conquerors, He Never Fails (2009). Winans has signed other artist to Destiny Joy including B.K. Douglas and More Than Conquerors.

== Personal life ==
In 1973, Winans married Ronald E. Brown, who eventually became the bishop of Faith Tabernacle Deliverance Temple in Orangeburg, South Carolina. Winans divorced Brown in an undisclosed year. During their marriage, Winans gave birth to their only son Mario Mendell Brown. Her son adopted the stage name Mario Winans and became a singer and music producer.

In June 1978, she married Marvin Winans, a singer and member of the gospel group The Winans. Marvin influenced Winans to pursue a career music rather than fashion designing. With Marvin, she had a son, Marvin "Coconut" Winans Jr. Winans also gave birth prematurely to a daughter, Destiny Joy Winans, whom lived for only an hour and five minutes. In 1995, Winans and Marvin divorced after sixteen years of marriage. In an interview with Ebony magazine, Winans disclosed that the stress of their divorce caused her to develop ulcers and gain weight.

In November 2003, Winans married Joe McLemore, a businessman. Although their divorce was not publicized, Winans remarked that they were together for ten years.

== Awards and achievements ==
Vickie Winans has earned an array of awards, honors, and nominations. These include eight Stellar Awards, seven Grammy Award nominations, and two Soul Train Music Award nominations.

== Discography ==
Studio albums

- Be Encouraged (1985)
- Total Victory (1989)
- The Lady (1991)
- Vickie Winans (1994)
- Bringing It All Together (2003)
- Woman to Woman: Songs of Life (2006)
- Happy Holidays (2007)
- How I Got Over (2009)

== Tours ==
Headlining tours

- Rising Star Tour (2005)

Co-headlining tours

- McDonald's Gospelfest Tour (2002; Hezekiah Walker, Cissy Houston, Virtue, and Desiree Coleman)
- Family Comedy Tour (2010)

== Theatre and musical ==
List of acting performances in theatre
Year	Title	Role	Notes	Source
1989	Don't Get God Started	Female lead vocalist	Lead role; Broadway	
1991-93	The First Lady	Paula	Lead role; National Tour	
2004	Torn Between Two Loves	The Nun	Lead role	
2024	Tell 'Em I'm Gonna Make It		Supporting role	
