= Marvin Winans =

American musical artist (born 1958)

Bishop Marvin Winans
- Born: Marvin Lawrence Winans; March 5, 1958 (age 68)
- Origin: Detroit, Michigan, U.S.
- Genre: Gospel
- Occupations: Singer, pastor, actor
- Years active: 1975-present
- Labels: with The Winans; Light; Qwest/Warner Bros. with the Perfected Praise Choir; Sparrow Records; Diamante Music Group; Artemis Gospel; Pure Springs Gospel

Marvin Lawrence Winans Sr. (born March 5, 1958) is an American pastor, gospel singer, member of the Winans family, and a member of the Winans, a musical group. He is also known for his recurring role in the hit show Tyler Perry's House of Payne.

== Life and career ==
=== Early life ===
Winans was born in Detroit, Michigan, the fourth of ten children of Delores (née Ransom) and David Glenn Winans Sr., who recorded together as "Mom and Pop Winans". His siblings David II, Carvin (Marvin's fraternal twin), Benjamin (BeBe), Daniel, Michael, Ronald, Priscilla (CeCe), Deborah (Debbie), and Angelique (Angie) also have careers in the music industry as singers, writers and producers. As a pastor, he was influenced by Mother Estella Boyd who was known for her healing, music, and Pentecostal ministry in Detroit.

=== Musical career ===
Winans sang in the 1970s with his brothers Ronald, Carvin, and Michael as the Testimonial Singers. The group also included others. Their first performance was at a high school talent show. In 1975, the group's name was changed to the Winans. Their musical careers spanned from the 1980s to the 1990s. The Winans, who were discovered by Andrae Crouch, released their first album under the new group's name, entitled Introducing The Winans, in 1981.

The Winans were greatly influenced by Albertina Walker and her group the Caravans. An organist and pianist, Marvin also wrote songs and produced for the Winans records, for solo projects from family members, and on other gospel releases. For his vocals on the 1985 song "Bring Back the Days of Yea and Nay", Winans was awarded a Grammy for Best Male Soul Gospel Performance.

He founded Perfecting Church in Detroit, Michigan, in 1989. He released an album featuring the church's choir in 1992 entitled Introducing Perfected Praise.

In 1997, he founded the Marvin L. Winans Academy of Performing Arts (WAPA). In 2007, Winans released his first solo recording, Alone, But Not Alone, which was nominated for a Grammy Award for Best Contemporary R&B Gospel Album. His fourth album, entitled Marvin L. Winans presents the Praise + Worship Experience, was released on June 26, 2012, and recorded at his church through MLW Productions. The album features Don Moen, Marvin Sapp, Donnie McClurkin, Mary Mary, Mom Winans, Roderick Dixon, and Bishop Paul S. Morton, amongst others.

On Saturday, February 18, 2012, Winans delivered the eulogy at Whitney Houston's funeral at New Hope Baptist Church in Newark, New Jersey. He and several of his siblings and family members sang The Winans' "Tomorrow" at the service.

On July 11, 2025, Winans appeared on Justin Bieber's album Swag with his song "Forgiveness", a rendition of the 1989 song "Lord, I Lift Your Name on High" by Rick Founds. With 163,000 sales and 3.8 million digital streams in the US, the song debuted at number 1 on the Billboard Hot Gospel Songs chart and number 3 on the Hot Christian Songs.

=== Pastoral Career ===
On October 20th, 2025, a video of Winans appearing to publicly shame one of his followers, Roberta McCoy, for donating $1,235 to his church instead of the $2,000 he had requested was posted on X (formerly Twitter) by an account named The Daily Loud. Winans garnered criticism and national media scrutiny following the post's disclosure.

Following the backlash from the video, Winans would go on to publicly defend his actions, stating that this event had been part of Perfecting Church’s “Day of Giving”, in which donations were being requested to help finish a new sanctuary in Detroit. He asserted that he had instructed his followers to come to the front in order of largest donations to the smallest, $2000 reportedly being the largest and $1.62 being the smallest amount and said that his reasoning was to maintain order and prevent the elderly from standing for extended periods of time.

He claimed this to be the reason for chastising McCoy, as allegedly, she had failed to adhere to this instruction. McCoy would also defend the pastor’s actions, noting that she had also been the victim of online attacks following the public release of the footage, further remarking that she had been a long standing member of the church and would continue to make contributions going forward.

== Personal life ==
Winans was married to gospel singer Vickie Winans (née Bowman) for 16 years until their divorce in 1995. His sons Marvin Jr. (Coconut) and Josiah, and stepson Mario Winans are in the music business. Mario is a producer and R&B singer. Josiah is a producer featured on Marvin Jr.'s first solo project. Marvin Jr., once a member of Winans Phase 2, is a solo artist, producer, and pastor of Perfecting Home Church. Winans married Deneen Carter in April 2022.

== Discography ==
=== Studio albums ===
Title	Details	Peak chart positions		
Title	Details	US	US R&B	US Gospel
Introducing the Winans	Released: 1981; Label: Light Records; Formats: LP	—	—	—
Long Time Comin'	Released: 1983; Label: Light; Formats: LP	—	—	—
Tomorrow	Released: 1984; Label: Light; Formats: LP	—	—	—
Let My People Go	Released: 1985; Label: Qwest Records, Warner Records; Formats: LP	—	—	—
Decisions	Released: 1987; Label: Qest, Warner; Formats: LP	—	—	—
Return	Released: 1990; Label: Qwest, Warner; Formats: CD	—	—	—
Perfecting Church	Released: 1992; Label: Sparrow Records; Formats: CD	—	—	14
All Out	Released: 1993; Label: Qwest, Warner; Formats: CD	—	—	—
Heart & Soul	Released: 1995; Label: Qwest, Warner; Formats: CD	—	—	—
Christmas: Our Gifts to You	Released: 2000; Label: Diamante Music Group; Formats: CD	—	—	—
Friends	Released: 2001; Label: Diamante; Formats: CD	—	—	—
The Songs of Marvin Winans	Released: 2006; Label: Artemis Records; Formats: CD	—	—	—
Alone but Not Alone	Released: January 1, 2007; Label: Pure Springs Gospel; Formats: CD, digital download, streaming	85	77	1
"—" denotes a recording that did not chart or was not released in that territory.

=== Charted songs ===
List of charting songs and peak chart positions
Title	Year	Peak chart positions				Album
Title	Year	US R&B	US R&B Air	US Gospel	US Gospel Air	Album
"Just Don't Wanna Know"	2008	87	25	— (Note: "Just Don't Wanna Know" did not enter the Billboard Hot Gospel Songs, but peaked at number 13 on the Gospel Digital Song Sales.)		Alone but Not Alone
"It's All God" (with The Soul Seekers)	2010	—	—	17		Soul Seekers II
"Something About the Name Jesus" (with Kirk Franklin, Rance Allen, John P. Kee, and Isaac Carree)	2011	—	—	— (Note: "Something About the Name Jesus" did not enter the Billboard Hot Gospel Songs, but peaked at number 16 on the Gospel Digital Song Sales.)		Hello Fear
"Send Your Rain" (with Clint Brown)	2011	—	—	28		Release
"Let the Church Say Amen" (with Andrae Crouch)	2011	90	27	1		The Journey
"Draw Me Close (Thy Will Be Done)"	2012	—	—	21		Marvin L. Winans Presents: The Praise & Worship Experience
"It Belongs to Me" (with Juan Winans and Lisa Winans)	2020	—	—	7	1	Non-album singles
"Everything Will Be Alright" (with Spencer Taylor Jr. and Only 4 Jesus United)	2022	—	—	— (Note: "Everything Will Be Alright" did not enter the Billboard Hot Gospel Songs, but peaked at number 7 on the Gospel Digital Song Sales.)	—	Non-album singles
"Able" (with Jonathan McReynolds)	2023	—	—	6	1	My Truth
"Forgiveness"	2025	—	—	1	—	Swag
"—" denotes a recording that did not chart or was not released in that territory.
