= The Winans =

American gospel quartet (1980–2005)

- Origin: Detroit, Michigan, U.S.
- Genres: Gospel, R&B
- Years active: 1980–2005
- Labels: Light; Qwest/Warner Bros.
- Spinoffs: BeBe & CeCe Winans
- Past members: Marvin Winans; Carvin Winans; Michael Winans; Ronald Winans

The Winans were an American gospel quartet from Detroit, Michigan, consisting of brothers Marvin, Carvin, Michael and Ronald Winans.

== History ==
Brothers Ronald, Marvin, Carvin, and Michael Winans, the second, third, fourth and fifth siblings of the Winans family, grew up in Detroit, Michigan. They were discovered by Andrae Crouch, who signed them to Light Records.

Ronald, Marvin, and Carvin made two albums in 1974 without Michael, and in 1975 with Michael under the name the Testimonial Singers.

Their big break was their first record Introducing the Winans, produced in 1981 by Andrae Crouch, two years after he discovered them and invited them to tour with him.

They performed vocals in This Is America, Charlie Brown's segment "The Building of the Transcontinental Railroad" in 1989. Their style was noted for its crossover efforts and received airplay on R&B radio. The group's last recording was in 1995. They have been involved in various Winans family projects where they are credited as the Winans, like on November 2000's Christmas: Our Gifts to You.

The eldest brother of the group Ronald Winans died on June 17, 2005, of retaining fluid.

== Discography ==
=== Studio albums ===
Year	Album details	Chart positions				Certifications (sales thresholds)
Year	Album details	US	US R&B	US Gospel	US CCM	Certifications (sales thresholds)
1981	Introducing the Winans: Released: 1981; Label: Light	—	—	—	—	
1983	Long Time Comin': Released: 1983; Label: Light	—	—	8	—	
1984	Tomorrow: Released: 1984; Label: Light	—	—	3	—	
1985	Let My People Go: Released: August 1, 1985; Label: Qwest / Warner Bros.	—	57	1	—	
1987	Decisions: Released: September 1, 1987; Label: Qwest / Warner Bros.	109	30	1	12	
1988	Live at Carnegie Hall: Released: 1988; Label: Qwest / Warner Bros.	—	—	13	22	
1990	Return: Released: April 24, 1990; Label: Qwest / Warner Bros.	90	12	1	4	US: Gold
1993	All Out: Released: August 24, 1993; Label: Qwest / Warner Bros.	—	41	15	9	US Sales: 79,000
1995	Heart & Soul: Released: October 24, 1995; Label: Qwest / Warner Bros.	—	—	3	12	
2000	Christmas: Our Gifts to You: Released: November 14, 2000; Label: Diamante	—	—	—	—	
"—" denotes releases that did not chart

=== Compilation albums ===
Year	Album details	Chart positions	Certifications (sales thresholds)
Year	Album details	US Gospel	Certifications (sales thresholds)
1990	The Best of the Winans: Released: October 17, 1990; Label: Light	—	
1994	Feel the Spirit: Released: May 15, 1994; Label: Metacom Music	-	
1995	The Light Years: Released: November 7, 1995; Label: Light	—	
2002	Legends of Gospel: Released: February 19, 2002; Label: Light	—	
2002	The Very Best of the Winans: Released: April 16, 2002; Label: Rhino	16	
2003	Great Family of Gospel: Released: September 4, 2003; Label: EMI Gospel	—	
2004	Gospel Greats: Released: April 6, 2004; Label: Flashback / Rhino	—	
2005	The Definitive Original Greatest Hits: Released: August 23, 2005; Label: Artemis Gospel	—	
2008	Gospel Legacy: Released: January 22, 2008; Label: Light	—	
"—" denotes releases that did not chart

=== Singles ===
Year	Single	Peak chart positions		Album
Year	Single	US R&B	UK	Album
1985	"Let My People Go"	42	71	Let My People Go
1985	"Very Real Way"	—	—	Let My People Go
1986	"The Real Meaning of Christmas"	—	—	The Real Meaning of Christmas (maxi-single)/"Decisions"
1987	"Ain't No Need to Worry" (feat. Anita Baker)	15	—	Decisions
1987	"Love Has No Color" (feat. Michael McDonald)	—	—	Decisions
1987	"Give Me You"	—	—	Decisions
1989	"Lean on Me" (with Thelma Houston)	73	—	Lean on Me (soundtrack)
1990	"It's Time" (featuring Teddy Riley)	5	—	Return
1990	"A Friend" (featuring Aaron Hall)	11	—	Return
1990	"When You Cry" (featuring Kenny G)	40	—	Return
1991	"Don't Leave Me"	34	—	Return
1993	"Payday" (featuring R. Kelly)	74	—	All Out
1994	"That Extra Mile"	—	—	All Out
1995	"Heart & Soul"	89	—	Heart & Soul
1996	"Count It All Joy"	—	—	Heart & Soul
1996	"Standing on Promises"	—	—	Heart & Soul
"—" denotes the single failed to chart or was not released

== Awards ==
- Grammy Award for Best Contemporary Soul Gospel Album: All Out (1993)
- Grammy Award for Best Soul Gospel Performance by a Duo, Group, Choir or Chorus: "Let Brotherly Love Continue" (Daniel Winans featuring the Winans & BeBe Winans) (1990)
- Grammy Award for Best Gospel Performance by a Duo or Group, Choir or Chorus: The Winans Live at Carnegie Hall (1988)
- Grammy Award for Best Soul Gospel Performance by a Duo, Group, Choir or Chorus: "Ain't No Need to Worry" (The Winans featuring Anita Baker) (1987)
- Grammy Award for Best Soul Gospel Performance by a Duo, Group, Choir or Chorus: "Let My People Go" (1986)
- Grammy Award for Best Soul Gospel Performance, Male: "Bring Back the Days of Yea and Nay" (Marvin Winans) (1985)
- Grammy Award for Best Soul Gospel Performance by a Duo, Group, Choir or Chorus: "Tomorrow" (1985)

== See also ==
- Winans family
- Ronald Winans
- Marvin Winans
