= Hallelujah! (gospel song) =

Song by Various Artists

from the album Handel's Messiah: A Soulful Celebration
- Released: 1992
- Genre: Gospel, contemporary Christian
- Length: 5:53
- Label: Warner Alliance
- Composer(s): George Frideric Handel
- Producer(s): Mervyn Warren

"Hallelujah!" is a 1992 song from Handel's Messiah: A Soulful Celebration, a Grammy Award winning Reprise Records concept album. The song is a soulful re-interpretation of the "Hallelujah" chorus from Messiah, George Frideric Handel's well-known oratorio from 1741. It is performed by a choir of all-star gospel, contemporary Christian, R&B and jazz singers, along with several actors. The song was arranged and produced by Take 6 alumnus Mervyn Warren, and conducted by Quincy Jones. Handel's Messiah: A Soulful Celebration won the Grammy Award for Best Contemporary Soul Gospel Album in 1992, as well as a Dove Award for Contemporary Gospel Album of the Year.

The vocalists performing on "Hallelujah!" are Vanessa Bell Armstrong, Patti Austin, Bernie K., Daryl Coley, Commissioned, Andrae Crouch, Sandra Crouch, Clifton Davis, Charles S. Dutton, Kim Fields, Larnelle Harris, Edwin Hawkins, Tramaine Hawkins, Linda Hopkins, Al Jarreau, Chaka Khan, Gladys Knight, Lizz Lee, Dawnn Lewis, Babbie Mason, Johnny Mathis, Marilyn McCoo, Mike E., Stephanie Mills, Jeffrey Osborne, David Pack, Phylicia Rashad, Joe Sample, Richard Smallwood, Sounds of Blackness, Take 6, Darryl Tookes, Mervyn Warren, Thomas Whitfield, Vanessa Williams and Chris Willis.

== See also ==
- Messiah (Handel)
