= My Heart Is Calling =

Single by Whitney Houston

from the album The Preacher's Wife: Original Soundtrack Album
- B-side: "I Go to the Rock"
- Released: June 10, 1997
- Recorded: 1996
- Studio: Brandon's Way Recording (Los Angeles, CA)
- Genre: R&B; gospel; funk
- Length: 4:15
- Label: Arista
- Songwriter: Babyface
- Producer: Babyface

Whitney Houston singles chronology
"Step by Step" (1997)	"My Heart Is Calling" (1997)	"When You Believe" (1998)

Licensed audio
- "My Heart Is Calling" on YouTube

"My Heart Is Calling" is a song recorded by the American recording artist Whitney Houston for the 1996 film The Preacher's Wife. It was released on June 10, 1997, as the third and final single by Arista Records from the accompanying soundtrack. The song was written and produced solely by Babyface. Musically, the song is an R&B ballad, with gospel music and funk influences, and the lyrics speak about meeting someone special. "My Heart Is Calling" received mainly positive reviews from music critics, who commended Houston's soulful performance. It peaked at number 77 on the United States Billboard Hot 100, and number 35 on Billboard Hot R&B/Hip-Hop Songs chart. There was no music video made for the song.

== Composition ==
Whitney Houston "My Heart Is Calling" (1997)
A 24-second sample of "My Heart Is Calling", described as a "dance-floor" ballad by Entertainment Weekly. The song makes use of Houston's low range of vocals.

"My Heart Is Calling" was written and produced solely by Babyface. It is a moderately paced R&B ballad, composed with "a beat". According to the sheet music published at Musicnotes.com by Sony/ATV Music Publishing, the song is written in the key of G major. The beat of the song is set in common time, and moves at a tempo of 104 beats per minute. It has the sequence of Em_{7}–D/F♯–G–Am_{7} as its chord progression. Houston's vocals in the song span from the note of D_{3} to the high note of E_{5}. According to Ted Cox, the author of the book Whitney Houston, the song sees Houston developing the low end of her range. Lyrically, "My Heart Is Calling" is a love song.

== Critical reception ==
"My Heart Is Calling" garnered mostly positive reviews from music critics. Chris Willman of Entertainment Weekly viewed the song as a "dance-floor" ballad, while Elysa Gardner of Los Angeles Times noted that the song was influenced by both gospel music and funk genres. She also wrote that the song explores Houston's more soulful side. Billboard magazine also noted the song has an "unusually saucy groove". According to Bob Waliszewski of Plugged In (publication), "Houston exuberantly captures the joy of meeting a special someone" through the song.

Billboard reviewed the song favorably, writing that it is "a wonderfully refreshing release that smartly side-steps her tried-and-true balladry in favor of a credible foray into jeep-funk territory." Steve Jones of USA Today wrote that "[the] Babyface-produced My Heart Is Calling; [...] have a spiritual feel. [They] help maintain a thematic cohesiveness that most soundtracks lack these days." Similarly, Elysa Gardner of Los Angeles Times also reviewed the song favorably, writing that "Houston shows her soulful side with equal panache, even if she has a tendency to overdo the obligatory vocal gymnastics at times."

== Chart performance ==
"My Heart Is Calling" debuted at number 81 on the US Billboard Hot 100, issue dated July 5, 1997. Two weeks later, the song peaked at number 77 on the chart. The following week, it dropped out of the chart. On the R&B/Hip-Hop charts, the song debuted at number 43, on the week dated June 28, 1997. The following week, the song ascended to number 35, a position which became its peak.

== Track listing ==
US CD single
No.	Title	Length
1.	"My Heart Is Calling"	4:15
2.	"I Go to the Rock"	4:05

== Credits and personnel ==
"My Heart Is Calling"

- Babyface – writer, producer, backing vocals
- Whitney Houston – vocals, backing vocals
- Shanna – backing vocals
- Shanice Wilson – backing vocals
- Brad Gilderman – engineer
- Jon Gass – mixer

"I Go to the Rock"

- Dottie Rambo – writer
- Mervyn Warren – producer
- Whitney Houston – vocals, producer
- The Georgia Mass Choir – choir
- Joseph Magee – engineer
- Michael White – engineer
- Frank Wolf – engineer, mixer

== Charts ==
Chart (1997)	Peak position
US Billboard Hot 100	77
US Hot R&B/Hip-Hop Songs (Billboard)	35
