= I Believe in You and Me =

1983 single by Four Tops

Single by The Four Tops

from the album One More Mountain
- A-side: "Sad Hearts"
- Released: 1983
- Genre: Soul; ballad
- Length: 4:02
- Label: Casablanca
- Songwriters: Sandy Linzer; David Wolfert

The Four Tops singles chronology
"Tonight I'm Gonna Love You All Over" (1982)	"I Believe in You and Me" (1983)	"I Just Can't Walk Away" (1983)

"I Believe in You and Me" is a song written by Sandy Linzer and David Wolfert in 1982. The song was first recorded and released by the R&B group The Four Tops, who released it as a single from their album One More Mountain (1982). While it failed to reach the US Top 40, it became a moderate hit for the group on the US Billboard Hot Black Singles chart, peaking at number 40 in early 1983.

In 1996, R&B/pop singer Whitney Houston recorded a cover of the song for her film, The Preacher's Wife, and released it as a single. Following its release, the song became a top 5 pop and R&B hit in the US, also peaking on music charts worldwide.

== History and composition ==
The original version recorded by The Four Tops was a moderate success, charting at number 40 on the US Billboard's Hot Black Singles chart.

Due to the bigger success of the Whitney Houston version, "I Believe in You and Me" is most popularly known as a Whitney Houston song.

Shortly before the death of lead singer Levi Stubbs in 2008, who had been sidelined from the group due to complications of a stroke, and who used a wheelchair, appeared with the other members of The Four Tops, and Aretha Franklin, and sang "I Believe In You and Me" live onstage at the Detroit Opera House, in his final television appearance on From The Heart: The Four Tops 50th Anniversary Special (2004) on PBS.

=== Charts ===
Chart (1983)	Peak position
US Hot Black Singles (Billboard)	40

== Whitney Houston version ==
"I Believe in You and Me"

Single by Whitney Houston

from the album The Preacher's Wife: Original Soundtrack Album
- B-side: "Somebody Bigger Than You and I"
- Released: December 10, 1996 (U.S.); March 17, 1997 (U.K.)
- Recorded: 1996
- Studio: Signet Studios (Los Angeles, CA); Crossway Studios (Mendham, NJ)
- Genre: R&B; Pop
- Length: 3:55 (single version): 4:01 (soundtrack version)
- Label: Arista
- Songwriters: Sandy Linzer; David Wolfert
- Producers: David Foster (single) Mervyn Warren; Whitney Houston; (soundtrack version)

Whitney Houston singles chronology
"Why Does It Hurt So Bad" (1996)	"I Believe in You and Me" (1996)	"Step by Step" (1997)

Music video
- "I Believe in You and Me" on YouTube

Thirteen years later in 1996, American singer and actress Whitney Houston recorded a cover of the song for her soundtrack album, The Preacher's Wife, produced by Mervyn Warren and Houston on the film version, and David Foster on the single version of the song. It was released as the soundtrack's first single on December 10, 1996 by Arista Records. Houston received a Grammy nomination for Best Female R&B Vocal Performance for her performance of the song at the 40th Annual Grammy Awards on February 25, 1998. Whitney Houston's version was edited & sampled to create a duet with Barry Manilow for his album My Dream Duets (2014).

=== Composition ===
"I Believe in You and Me

"I Believe in You and Me" is a slow tempo R&B song with strong gospel influences. Written in the key of B major then modulates to C major, the beat is set in common time and moves at a slow 66 beats per minute. Houston's vocals in the song spans from the low note of G_{3} to the high note of A_{5}.

=== Critical response ===
J. D. Considine of The Baltimore Sun called the song "the Designated Hit Ballad" and added "[it] is pretty much what we've come to expect from Houston ― a slow, Streisand-esque build-up, a subtle sense of drama and a big, full-voiced payoff in the final chorus." Also American magazine Billboard gave the song a positive review, saying "As she did with Dolly Parton's 'I Will Always Love You,' Houston redefines the composition with a soaring, glass-shattering performance that will leave her legions of fans breathless." While reviewing the soundtrack, Elysa Gardner of Los Angeles Times wrote described it as "a cheesy classic in the tradition of 'I Will Always Love You,' with an instantly familiar melody and a poignant, bolero-like arrangement." A reviewer from Music Week commented, "More serious schmaltz from The Preacher's Wife soundtrack. Clearly destined for the Top 20 and anyone with a chocolate box heart." In his review for the soundtrack, Neil Strauss from The New York Times praised the song as one of "the year's most virtuosic pop ballads."

=== Commercial performance ===
The song impacted radio on November 20. According to Broadcast Data Systems, the ballad received "151 spins on 82 radio stations". The song was part of Arista's "complex multisingle campaign that is designed to illuminate the various musical styles showcased on the album," with plans to release Houston's funk-arranged production of "Somebody Bigger than You and I", an "all-star" jam featuring husband Bobby Brown and his New Edition group mates Ralph Tresvant and Johnny Gill and female R&B artists Faith Evans and Monica.

The song was officially released on December 10, 1996. On the Billboard issue dated December 28, 1996, it debuted inside the top ten of both the Billboard Hot 100 and Hot R&B Singles charts at numbers seven and six respectively.

Four weeks later, on January 25, 1997, it was released in the R&B marketplace as a two-sided single with "Somebody Bigger Than You and I" from the soundtrack. It peaked at number four on the Billboard Hot R&B chart, staying on the chart for 20 weeks. The following week, it also reached a peak of number four on the Billboard Hot 100 chart, becoming Houston's 16th top five hit. The song entered the Billboard Adult Contemporary chart at number 19, the issue date of December 14, 1996 and peaked at number two, making it her 21st top ten hit of the chart, the issue date of March 1, 1997. The song was ranked thirty-three on the 1997 Billboard Year-end Hot 100 Singles chart. Additionally, "I Believe in You and Me/Somebody Bigger Than You and I" two-sided single placed at position number twenty-nine on the 1997 Billboard Year-end Hot R&B Singles chart. On the Billboard Adult R&B Songs list, the song peaked at number one, staying there for four weeks.

The single was certified Platinum for the shipments of 1,000,000 copies or more by the Recording Industry Association of America (RIAA) on February 4, 1997, becoming Houston's fourth Platinum single.

Worldwide, it was released as the second single from the soundtrack after "Step by Step". The single peaked at number 16 on the UK Singles Chart, number 59 in Canada and number 46 in Sweden.

=== Music video ===
The music video for Houston's version of the song was filmed in Fishkill, New York. It uses the single version produced by David Foster, which features a different arrangement from the jazz version produced by Houston and Mervyn Warren. The scenery is set in a wintery forest with her singing as she is surrounding with trees decorated with Christmas lights, live orchestration and lightning flashes. Scenes from the movie are intercut in the video.

=== Live performances ===
Houston performed "I Believe in You and Me" on Saturday Night Live on December 14, 1996. Houston also sang the song on the National Lottery show, broadcast live on the BBC in the United Kingdom on March 15, 1997. The song was performed in some concerts on her 1998 European Tour. For her 1999 My Love Is Your Love World Tour, it was used in a medley with "Why Does It Hurt So Bad" and "It Hurts Like Hell". Houston performed the song along with "I Will Always Love You" as a part of medley for the 25th Anniversary Celebration of Arista Records, taped at the Shrine Auditorium in Los Angeles on April 10 and later broadcast on NBC, May 15, 2000. In 2004, she performed a similar medley as part of a tribute to Clive Davis at the 16th World Music Awards on September 15, 2004. This performance was included in the 2014 CD/DVD release, Whitney Houston Live: Her Greatest Performances.

=== Track listings and formats ===
- US, CD maxi-single
1. "I Believe In You And Me" (Record Version) — 3:51
2. "Somebody Bigger Than You And I" — 4:41
3. "I Believe In You And Me" (Film Version) — 4:00
4. "The Lord Is My Shepherd" — 4:23
5. "Who Would Imagine a King" — 2:48
- Europe, CD maxi-single
1. "I Believe In You And Me" (Single Version) — 3:51
2. "Step By Step" (Radio Remix) — 3:56 ^{A}
3. "Step By Step" (K-Klassic Remix) — 10:06 ^{B}

^{A} Remix and additional production by Tony Moran
^{B} Remix and additional production by K-Klass

- UK, CD single
1. "I Believe in You and Me" (Single Version) — 3:51
2. "Step By Step" (Tony Moran Diva X Diva Mix) — 10:04 ^{B}
3. "Step By Step" (K-Klassic Mix) — 10:06 ^{B}
- Australia, CD maxi-single
1. "I Believe in You and Me" (Single Version) — 3:51
2. "Step By Step" (Tony Moran Radio Remix) — 3:56 ^{A}
3. "Step By Step" (K-Klassic Mix) — 10:06 ^{B}

=== Credits and personnel ===
Credits adapted from single liner notes.

"I Believe In You and Me" (Record Version)

- David Foster – producer
- Sandy Linzer – writer
- David Wolfert – writer
- Whitney Houston – vocals, vocal arrangement

"I Believe In You and Me" (Film Version)

- Mervyn Warren – producer
- Whitney Houston – producer
- Whitney Houston – vocals, vocal arrangement

"Somebody Bigger Than You And I"

- Rickey Minor – producer
- Whitney Houston – producer
- Johnny Lange – writer
- Sonny Burke – writer
- Whitney Houston – vocals, vocal arrangement

"The Lord Is My Shepherd"

- Mervyn Warren – producer
- Whitney Houston – producer
- Traditional – writer
- Mervyn Warren – choral arrangement
- Cissy Houston – vocals, choral arrangerment

"Who Would Imagine A King"

- Mervyn Warren – producer
- Whitney Houston – producer
- Hallerin H. Hill – writer
- Mervyn Warren – writer
- Mervyn Warren – choral arrangement
- Whitney Houston – vocals, vocal arrangement

=== Notable cover versions ===
- At the 12th annual Soul Train Music Awards on February 27, 1998, the song was performed by Kenny Lattimore and Terry Ellis as part of a musical tribute to Houston, who was honored with the Quincy Jones Award for outstanding career achievements in the field of entertainment on the ceremony.
- Kim Burrell sang the jazzy version of the song to tribute to Houston, who was honoree in entertainment field, and received a standing ovation on The 2010 BET Honors, taped at the Warner Theatre on January 16 and later aired on BET, February 1, 2010.
- Usher performed this song in the CBS special "Grammy presents: We Will Always Love You, Whitney Houston".
- American R&B singer, David Peaston, won a Soul Train Music Award for Best R&B/Soul or Rap New Artist, also recorded the song for his Mixed Emotions album (1991).

=== Charts and certifications ===
==== Weekly charts ====
Chart (1997)	Peak position
Australia (ARIA)	70
Canada Top Singles (RPM)	59
Canada Adult Contemporary (RPM)	2
Canada Contemporary Hit Radio (The Record)	33
Europe (Eurochart Hot 100)	87
Germany (GfK)	98
Israel (Israeli Singles Chart)	22
Netherlands (Dutch Top 40 Tipparade)	6
Netherlands (Single Top 100)	74
Scottish Singles Sales (Official Charts)	12
Sweden (Sverigetopplistan)	46
UK Singles (Official Charts)	16
UK Airplay (Music Control)	79
US Billboard Hot 100	4
US Adult Contemporary (Billboard)	2
US Adult Pop Airplay (Billboard)	23
US Hot R&B/Hip-Hop Songs (Billboard)	4
US Adult R&B Songs (Billboard)	1
US Pop Airplay (Billboard)	31
US Rhythmic Airplay (Billboard)	19

==== Year-end charts ====
Chart (1997)	Position
Canada Adult Contemporary (RPM)	29
US Billboard Hot 100	33
US Hot Adult Contemporary Singles (Billboard)	11
US Hot R&B Singles (Billboard)	29
US Top Soundtrack Singles (Billboard)	5

==== Certifications ====
Region	Certification	Certified units/sales
United States (RIAA)	Platinum	1,000,000
