= The Preacher's Wife (soundtrack) =

The Preacher's Wife: Original Soundtrack Album

Soundtrack album by Whitney Houston
- Released: November 26, 1996
- Recorded: January – February 1996
- Genres: Gospel; soul; R&B
- Length: 62:20
- Labels: Arista; BMG
- Producers: Whitney Houston; Mervyn Warren; Rickey Minor; Steve Lipson; Babyface; David Foster

Whitney Houston chronology
The Bodyguard: Original Soundtrack Album (1992)	The Preacher's Wife: Original Soundtrack Album (1996)	My Love Is Your Love (1998)

Singles from The Preacher's Wife
- 1. "I Believe in You and Me" Released: December 10, 1996; 2. "Step by Step" Released: February 24, 1997; 3. "My Heart Is Calling" Released: June 10, 1997

The Preacher's Wife: Original Soundtrack Album is the second soundtrack released by American singer Whitney Houston, accompanying the 1996 film of the same name, in which she starred. The soundtrack was released on November 26, 1996, by Arista Records and BMG Entertainment. The album was Houston's first in her career to be mainly produced by the singer, co-producing alongside Mervyn Warren on the album's "traditional gospel" material including renditions of Dottie Rambo's "I Go to the Rock", Kirk Franklin's "Joy" and Richard Smallwood's "I Love the Lord", the original composition "Who Would Imagine a King" and a gospel-inflected rendition of the Christmas hymn such as "Joy to the World".

Besides Houston and Warren, the album also contributed production from Babyface, Stephen Lipson, David Foster and Teddy Riley and featured guest artists such as New Edition lead singers Bobby Brown, Ralph Tresvant and Johnny Gill, contemporary R&B singers Faith Evans and Monica, gospel artist Shirley Caesar and Houston's mother Cissy Houston with choir participation from the Georgia Mass Choir and Hezekiah Walker's Love Fellowship Choir.

The album was her first credited soundtrack release since The Bodyguard (1992). Upon its release, it peaked at number three on the Billboard 200 and debuted at number one on its Top Gospel Albums chart where it stayed for 26 straight weeks, a record at the time and still an all-time record for a female artist. It also produced the highest single-week sales of a gospel album of all time in the United States, selling over 330,000 copies during its sixth week.

The soundtrack produced three singles. Its first single, "I Believe in You and Me", was the first to be released primarily in the United States where it debuted inside the top ten simultaneously on the Billboard Hot 100, Hot R&B/Hip-Hop Songs and Adult Contemporary charts, eventually selling over a million copies in the country. The song was sometimes issued as a double-sided single with the Houston-produced rendition of "Somebody Bigger Than You and I". The second single, a gospel-dance rendition of "Step by Step", was a bigger international hit in several global markets, while a third, "My Heart Is Calling", was a moderate hit in the United States.

The album received many awards and accolades, including a controversial Grammy Award nomination for Best R&B Album and the American Music Award for Favorite Soundtrack and the NAACP Image Award for Outstanding Album. Her rendition of "I Go to the Rock" won the Dove Award for Best Traditional Gospel Recording. It was ranked the top-selling gospel album of 1997 by Billboard and won the NARM Award for being the best-selling gospel release of 1997.

The album has since been certified triple platinum by the Recording Industry Association of America for sales of three million copies in the United States and became the first gospel release to sell a million copies in Europe, as well as half a million copies in Asia. It would go on to sell six million copies worldwide, making it the best-selling gospel album of all time, a record Houston still holds.

== Background ==
In 1992, Whitney Houston's film career was launched by the release of The Bodyguard. The film and her accompanying soundtrack from it were both hugely successful, with the soundtrack selling over 45 million copies worldwide, becoming the best-selling soundtrack album of all time, the best-selling album by a female artist and the third best-selling album of all time.

Houston then followed that up with the film, Waiting to Exhale, which Houston contributed three songs from its multi-artist soundtrack, was also hugely successful, selling over 12 million copies worldwide.

Following the release of Waiting to Exhale, actor Denzel Washington offered Houston a role in the upcoming comedy, The Preacher's Wife where she was to play the role of Julia Biggs, wife of Rev. Henry Biggs, played by Courtney B. Vance and the leader of a church choir. Houston eventually accepted the role for $10 million, which made her the highest-paid black female actress at the time.

Because the film was focused on family and religion, Houston offered to record and produce the entire soundtrack as she had long desired to record a gospel album. Houston had been brought up in gospel music under the tutelage of mother Cissy Houston at Newark's New Hope Baptist Church as a child. She sang her first church solo at the age of twelve at the same church. While seeking a record deal in the early 1980s, a teenage Houston recorded three gospel demos to grab the attention of record labels before she signed to Arista Records in 1983.

After finding mainstream stardom with pop and R&B material, Houston added gospel songs during her concert tours. Houston collaborated with members of the Winans family, including BeBe & CeCe Winans, recording two songs on their album, Heaven, in 1988. For the soundtrack to The Bodyguard, Houston recorded and produced a pop-rendered rendition of the traditional gospel hymn, "Jesus Loves Me", which she received critical praise.

== Recording and content ==
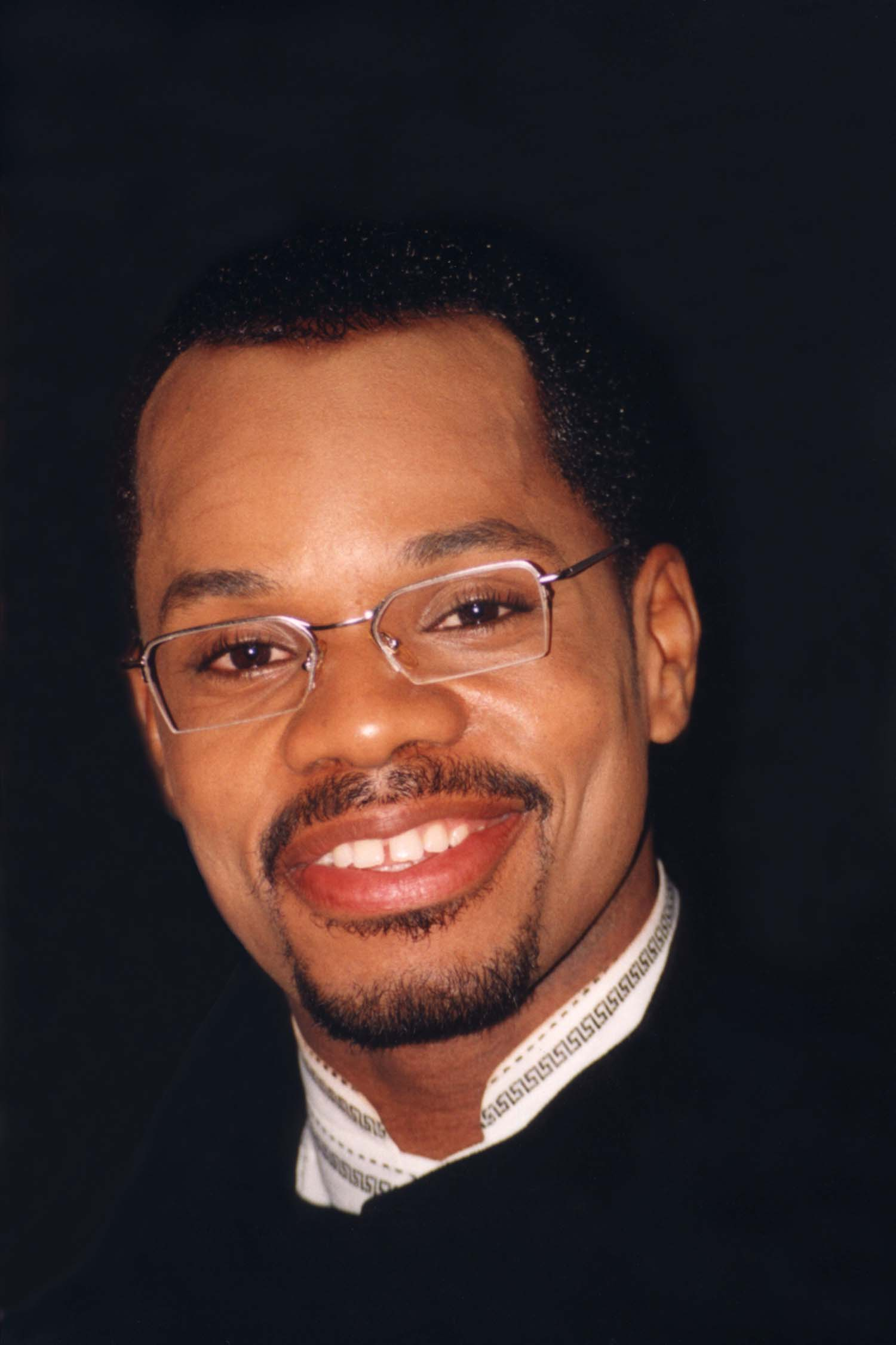
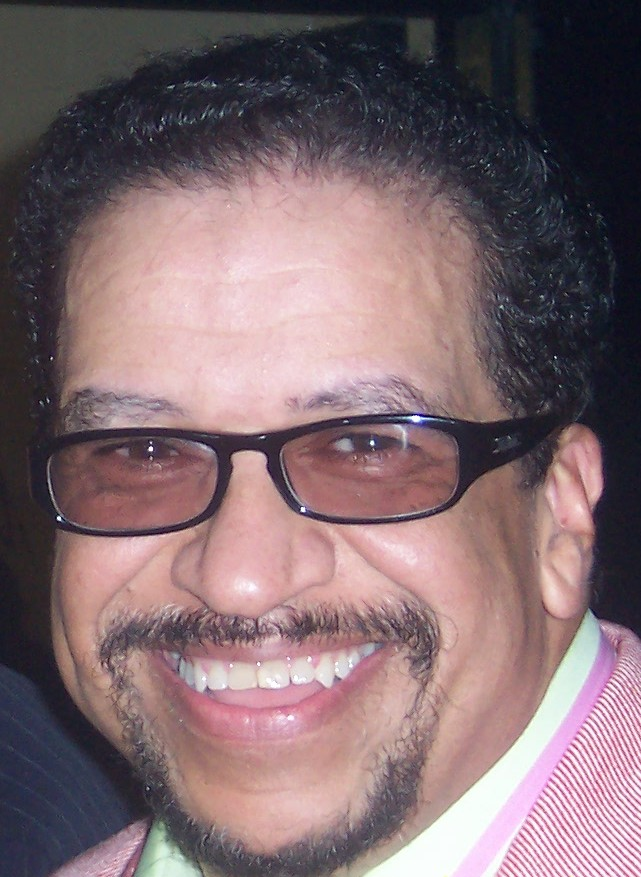
Songs by gospel musicians Kirk Franklin (left) and Richard Smallwood (right) were recorded for the soundtrack to The Preacher's Wife.

Houston recruited Mervyn Warren, founding former member of the gospel group Take 6, to be her collaborator in producing the album.

The duo decided to record the more traditional gospel material at Atlanta's Greater Rising Star Baptist Church with the Georgia Mass Choir while some other songs were recorded at Houston's Crossway Recording Studios in her hometown of Mendham Township, New Jersey, as well as studios in New York and Los Angeles, including a gospel and jazz-inspired rendition of the Four Tops' "I Believe in You and Me".

Among the "traditional" gospel recordings on the album, Houston and Warren recorded renditions of Kirk Franklin's "Joy", Dottie Rambo's "I Go to the Rock", Richard Smallwood's "I Love the Lord", an up tempo rendition of "Joy to the World" and two original compositions, "Hold On, Help Is on the Way" and "Who Would Imagine a King".

For the more pop-leaning work on the album, Houston reunited with David Foster, who produced a more pop-friendly version of "I Believe in You and Me". When Annie Lennox learned of Houston seeking material to record for her next soundtrack, she sent her 1992 composition "Step by Step", which was produced by English producer Stephen Lipson in a house-inspired gospel arrangement; Lennox contributed background vocals to Houston's rendition. New jack swing producer Teddy Riley contributed a remix of the song that would be featured on the album.

The album would be the first full-length Houston recording in which songwriter Diane Warren would participate, after co-composing Houston and Aretha Franklin's 1989 duet, "It Isn't, It Wasn't, It Ain't Ever Gonna Be".

Warren would send Houston the song "You Were Loved", which would be produced by Babyface, with the latter producer recording the funk and R&B-leaning "My Heart Is Calling", the album's sole love song, dedicated to Houston's character Julia's growing attraction to Denzel Washington's film character of the angel Dudley.

Houston also produced, with longtime musical director Rickey Minor, a hip-hop soul-inflected rendition of "Somebody Bigger Than You and I", which featured her husband, singer Bobby Brown, his New Edition band mates Johnny Gill and Ralph Tresvant and female R&B singers Faith Evans and Monica; Brown and Tresvant provided a rap for the song as well.

The album gave Houston the opportunity to produce a song for her mother Cissy, who records the only song on the album to not feature Whitney, "The Lord is My Shepherd" with Hezekiah Walker and his Love Fellowship Crusade Choir. In addition, Houston recorded a duet with family friend Shirley Caesar on their rendition of "He's All Over Me".

Overall, the album took two months from January to February 1996 to record.

== Reception ==
Professional ratings
Review scores
Source	Rating
AllMusic	3/5 stars
Billboard	(favorable)
Entertainment Weekly	A−
The New York Times	(favorable)
Rolling Stone	2/5 stars

Music critics saw a more emotionally engaged side of Houston, particularly with the soundtrack's gospel offerings. “For the first time in her 12-year recording career, Houston sounds genuinely moved by her material. Early on she stumbles through the Annie Lennox-penned "Step By Step," but the presence of the Georgia Mass Choir on six subsequent tracks melts her frosty reserve,” People magazine wrote.

== Commercial performance ==
Released on November 26, 1996, The Preacher's Wife: Original Soundtrack Album debuted at number 12 on the Billboard 200 albums chart on the issue dated December 14, 1996, selling 90,500 units in the first week. On its second week, the album jumped to number four on the chart with the Greatest Gainer mark, and the following week reached number three which was the album's peak position, with reported sales of 330,000 copies that week, producing the highest first-week sales of a gospel release in history, a record it holds to this day. The album also debuted at number eight on the Billboard Top R&B Albums chart, and in three weeks later, peaked at the number one and remained there for two weeks, becoming her fourth number one album on the chart. It stayed for a total of 43 weeks and 49 weeks on the Billboard 200 chart and the Top R&B Albums chart respectively. In Europe, the soundtrack became the first and only gospel album in history to sell a million copies in the continent.

In addition, the soundtrack was more successful on the Billboard Top Gospel Albums chart. It debuted at number one, becoming the first album by a female solo artist to do so. It spent 26 consecutive weeks at the top from December 14, 1996, to June 7, 1997, an unbroken record for a female artist. It remained on the chart for 117 weeks during its initial run. It has since returned to the Top Gospel Albums chart for 52 more weeks, bringing its total to 169 cumulative weeks. The album was the number one gospel album on the 1997 Billboard Top Gospel Albums year-end chart.

Prior to the album's release, music industry insiders had expected The Preacher's Wife soundtrack to "do at least as well as" Waiting to Exhale's soundtrack, which sold 5,100,000 copies in the United States. The album was the Best-selling Gospel Recording by the National Association of Recording Merchandisers (NARM) in 1996–1997. It was certified 3× Platinum for shipping 3 million copies in the United States alone by the Recording Industry Association of America (RIAA) on June 30, 1998. According to Nielsen SoundScan, as of 2012, the album has sold 2,627,000 copies in the United States alone.

== Singles ==
The lead single, "I Believe in You and Me" (originally by The Four Tops), became a top five hit in the U.S. and was nominated for Best Female R&B Vocal Performance at the 40th Grammy Awards, where the soundtrack overall was nominated for Best R&B Album.

"Step by Step" was another hit single, peaking at number 15 on the Billboard Hot 100 chart and was a huge hit all throughout Europe. "My Heart Is Calling" became the soundtrack's final single release.

Though not released as a single, Houston submitted the track "You Were Loved" to the Princess Diana tribute album, Diana, Princess of Wales: Tribute in 1997, following the Princess' tragic death that year.

== Promotion and appearances ==
=== Pacific Rim Tour ===
Chart success of the soundtrack and its hit singles, "I Believe in You and Me" and "Step By Step", the singer further promoted the album and singles touring across Asia, Australia, and in North America. Known as the Pacific Rim Tour, Houston played shows in Japan, Thailand, Taiwan, Australia and Hawaii. The setlist featured tracks from the album, as well as duet performances of "Count On Me" with singer CeCe Winans and "In Return" at select shows in Japan.

Date	Title	Details
December 13, 1996	Rosie O'Donnell Show	Houston is interviewed by Rosie O'Donnell to promote The Preacher's Wife film and her soundtrack album.
December 14, 1996	Saturday Night Live	Houston performed "I Believe in You and Me" and "I Go to The Rock".
March 15, 1997	UK National Lottery Show	Houston performed "I Believe in You and Me" and later followed by a brief interview broadcast live on the BBC in the United Kingdom.

== Accolades ==
Like the majority of her work, Houston received awards and accolades from the soundtrack.

The album was nominated for the American Music Award for Favorite Soundtrack at the 1998 American Music Awards.

Houston was nominated for two Blockbuster Entertainment Awards in 1997 and 1998 in relation to the soundtrack, winning one for favorite female R&B artist in the former year.

For her overall contributions to music as well as her humanitarian efforts, Houston received the Triumphant Spirit Award at the 1997 Essence Awards, which was accepted by Houston's mother Cissy.

At the Dove Awards, Houston received two awards. In 1997, Houston received the special Dove Award for Outstanding Mainstream Contribution to Gospel Music, honoring her for incorporating gospel music into her art for mainstream pop audiences. The following year, in 1998, Houston won a competitive Dove Award in the category for Best Traditional Gospel Song of the Year for the song "I Go to the Rock", along with the song's writer and original performer Dottie Rambo.

At the 40th Annual Grammy Awards in 1998, the album was nominated for Best R&B Album, while the ballad "I Believe in You and Me" was nominated for Grammy Award for Best Female R&B Vocal Performance, losing both to singer Erykah Badu's Baduizm and Badu's hit "On & On" respectively. The nominations were controversial since the album was shunned from the Grammy gospel category. Houston responded to the snub by boycotting that year's ceremony.

Houston won two NAACP Image Awards for the soundtrack including Outstanding Gospel Artist, along with the Georgia Mass Choir and the album won Outstanding Album.

At the 1997 NARM Best Seller Awards, Houston received the award for best-selling gospel recording of the year for the soundtrack.

Her work with the soundtrack also resulted in Houston winning the People's Choice Award for favorite female musical performer in 1998, shared with country artist Reba McEntire.

Houston received two more special honors during the era, receiving the Soul Train Music Award lifetime honor, the Quincy Jones Award for career achievement. Houston also received the Pinnacle Award at the Trumpet Awards, which honored notable black Americans for achievement.

The Preacher's Wife was ranked the top gospel album on Billboard for the year of 1997.

== Track listing ==
All tracks are produced by Houston and Mervyn Warren, except where noted.

No.	Title	Writer(s)	Producer(s)	Length
1.	"I Believe in You and Me" (film version)	David Wolfert; Sandy Linzer		4:01
2.	"Step by Step"	Annie Lennox	Stephen Lipson	4:12
3.	"Joy" (with the Georgia Mass Choir)	Kirk Franklin		3:16
4.	"Hold On, Help Is on the Way" (with the Georgia Mass Choir)	Rev. Kenneth Paden		3:09
5.	"I Go to the Rock" (with the Georgia Mass Choir)	Dottie Rambo		4:05
6.	"I Love the Lord" (with the Georgia Mass Choir)	Richard Smallwood		4:57
7.	"Somebody Bigger Than You and I" (Featuring Bobby Brown, Faith Evans, Johnny Gill, Monica and Ralph Tresvant)	Johnny Lange; Hy Heath; Sonny Burke	Whitney Houston; Rickey Minor	4:42
8.	"You Were Loved"	Diane Warren	Babyface	4:13
9.	"My Heart Is Calling"	Babyface	Babyface	4:14
10.	"I Believe in You and Me" (single version)	David Wolfert; Sandy Linzer	David Foster	3:52
11.	"Step by Step" (Remix)	Annie Lennox	Remixed by Teddy Riley	4:34
12.	"Who Would Imagine a King"	Mervyn Warren; Hallerin Hilton Hill		3:31
13.	"He's All Over Me" (with Shirley Caesar and the Georgia Mass Choir)	Alvin Darling		3:53
14.	"The Lord Is My Shepherd" (performed by Cissy Houston with Hezekiah Walker & The Love Fellowship Crusade Choir)	Traditional		4:24
15.	"Joy to the World" (with the Georgia Mass Choir)	Isaac Watts		4:41

== Charts ==
=== Weekly charts ===
1996–1997 weekly chart performance for The Preacher's Wife: Original Soundtrack Album
Chart (1996–1997)	Peak position
Australian Albums (ARIA)	34
Austrian Albums (Ö3 Austria)	8
Belgian Albums (Ultratop Flanders)	34
Belgian Albums (Ultratop Wallonia)	45
Canada Top Albums/CDs (RPM)	29
Dutch Albums (Album Top 100)	17
European Top 100 Albums (Music & Media)	17
French Albums (SNEP)	28
German Albums (Offizielle Top 100)	9
Hungarian Albums (MAHASZ)	11
Icelandic Albums (Tónlist)	19
Italian Albums (Musica e dischi)	22
Japanese Albums (Oricon)	24
Norwegian Albums (VG-lista)	39
Scottish Albums (Official Charts)	50
Swedish Albums (Sverigetopplistan)	16
Swiss Albums (Schweizer Hitparade)	11
Taiwanese International Albums (IFPI)	7
UK Albums (Official Charts)	35
UK R&B Albums (Official Charts)	3
US Billboard 200	3
US Top R&B/Hip-Hop Albums (Billboard)	1
US Top Gospel Albums (Billboard)	1

2012 weekly chart performance for The Preacher's Wife: Original Soundtrack Album
Chart (2012)	Peak position
UK Soundtrack Albums (Official Charts)	12
US Billboard 200	80
US Soundtrack Albums (Billboard)	4

2023 weekly chart performance for The Preacher's Wife: Original Soundtrack Album
Chart (2023)	Peak position
Spanish Vinyl Albums (PROMUSICAE)	42
UK Soundtrack Albums (Official Charts)	10

=== Year-end charts ===
1996 year-end chart performance for The Preacher's Wife: Original Soundtrack Album
Chart (1996)	Position
Swedish Albums (Sverigetopplistan)	78

1997 year-end chart performance for The Preacher's Wife: Original Soundtrack Album
Chart (1997)	Position
Austrian Albums (Ö3 Austria)	49
European Top 100 Albums (Music & Media)	85
German Albums (Offizielle Top 100)	73
US Billboard 200	17
US Top Gospel Albums (Billboard)	1
US Top R&B Albums (Billboard)	17
US Top Soundtrack Albums (Billboard)	3

1998 year-end chart performance for The Preacher's Wife: Original Soundtrack Album
Chart (1998)	Position
US Top Gospel Albums (Billboard)	10

2017 year-end chart performance for The Preacher's Wife: Original Soundtrack Album
Chart (2017)	Position
US Top Gospel Albums (Billboard)	35

2018 year-end chart performance for The Preacher's Wife: Original Soundtrack Album
Chart (2018)	Position
US Top Gospel Albums (Billboard)	35

2021 year-end chart performance for The Preacher's Wife: Original Soundtrack Album
Chart (2021)	Position
US Top Gospel Albums (Billboard)	41

2023 year-end chart performance for The Preacher's Wife: Original Soundtrack Album
Chart (2023)	Position
US Top Gospel Albums (Billboard)	49

== Certifications and sales ==
Region	Certification	Certified units/sales
Australia (ARIA)	Gold	35,000^{^}
Canada (Music Canada)	Platinum	100,000^{^}
Hong Kong (IFPI Hong Kong)	Platinum	20,000^{*}
Italy (FIMI)	Gold	50,000^{*}
Japan (RIAJ)	2× Platinum	400,000^{^}
Spain (Promusicae)	Gold	50,000^{^}
Sweden (GLF)	Gold	40,000^{^}
Switzerland (IFPI Switzerland)	Gold	25,000^{^}
United Kingdom (BPI)	Silver	60,000^{^}
United States (RIAA)	3× Platinum	2,471,000
Summaries
Europe (IFPI)	Platinum	1,000,000^{*}
Worldwide	—	6,000,000 (as of 2016)
^{*} Sales figures based on certification alone.^{^} Shipments figures based on certification alone.

== See also ==
- List of number-one R&B albums of 1997 (U.S.)
