= Handel's Messiah: A Soulful Celebration =

Studio album by Various Artists
- Released: 1992
- Genre: Gospel, Contemporary Christian, jazz, R&B, hip hop
- Length: 75:42
- Label: Alliance
- Producer: Norman Miller; Gail Hamilton; Mervyn Warren (executive producers)

Handel's Messiah: A Soulful Celebration is a gospel album by various artists released in 1992 on Warner Alliance. Executive-produced by Norman Miller, Gail Hamilton and Mervyn Warren, it is a reinterpretation of the 1741 oratorio Messiah by George Frideric Handel. It has been widely praised for its use of multiple genres of African-American music, including spirituals, blues, ragtime, big band, jazz fusion, R&B and hip hop.

The album received the 1992 Grammy Award for Best Contemporary Soul Gospel Album, as well as the 1992 Dove Award for Contemporary Gospel Album of the Year. In 1993, the various recording artists in the project were collectively nominated for the NAACP Image Award for Outstanding Gospel Artist.

== Track listing ==
Professional ratings
Review scores
| Source | Rating |
|---|---|
| AllMusic | 4.5/5 stars |

| # | Title | Length | Arranger(s) | Producer(s) | Performer(s) |
|---|---|---|---|---|---|
| 1 | "Overture: A Partial History of Black Music" | 5:13 | Mervyn Warren, Shelton Kilby, Dwayne Adell, Cedric Dent, Joe Hogue | Mervyn Warren | Mervyn Warren, Janice Chandler Eteme, Dwayne Adell, Cedric Dent, Joe Hogue |
| 2 | "Comfort Ye My People" | 5:44 | Mervyn Warren and Michael O. Jackson | Mervyn Warren | Vanessa Bell Armstrong and Daryl Coley |
| 3 | "Every Valley Shall Be Exalted" | 3:42 | Mervyn Warren and Mark Kibble | Mervyn Warren | Lizz Lee and Chris Willis (with Mike E.) |
| 4 | "And the Glory of the Lord" | 3:57 | Charles Mims | George Duke | Dianne Reeves |
| 5 | "But Who May Abide the Day of His Coming" | 6:38 | David Pack, Greg Phillinganes and Patti Austin | David Pack and Patti Austin | Patti Austin |
| 6 | "And He Shall Purify" | 4:36 | Michael O. Jackson and Mervyn Warren | Mervyn Warren | Tramaine Hawkins |
| 7 | "Behold, A Virgin Shall Conceive" | 3:56 | George Duke | George Duke | Howard Hewett |
| 8 | "O Thou That Tellest Good Tidings to Zion" | 3:52 | Cedric Dent | Take 6 | Stevie Wonder and Take 6 |
| 9 | "For Unto Us a Child Is Born" | 3:53 | Gary Hines | Gary Hines | Core Cotton, Jamecia Bennett, James Wright, Carrie Harrington, Pat Lacy and Sounds of Blackness |
| 10 | "Glory to God" | 4:51 | Robert Sadin | Robert Sadin | The Boys Choir of Harlem, Leaders of the New School and Michelle Weeks |
| 11 | "Rejoice Greatly, O Daughter of Zion" | 5:07 | Richard Smallwood | Richard Smallwood | Richard Smallwood Singers |
| 12 | "Behold the Lamb of God" | 4:32 | The Yellowjackets | The Yellowjackets | The Yellowjackets |
| 13 | "Lift Up Your Heads, O Ye Gates" | 5:12 | Fred Hammond | Fred Hammond | Commissioned and The Clark Sisters |
| 14 | "Why Do the Nations So Furiously Rage?" | 2:36 | Mervyn Warren | Mervyn Warren | Al Jarreau |
| 15 | "I Know That My Redeemer Liveth" | 6:00 | Mervyn Warren and Michael O. Jackson | Mervyn Warren | Tevin Campbell |
| 16 | "Hallelujah!" | 5:53 | Mervyn Warren, Michael O. Jackson, and Mark Kibble | Mervyn Warren | Vanessa Bell Armstrong, Patti Austin, Bernie K., Daryl Coley (soloist), Commissioned, Andrae Crouch, Sandra Crouch, Clifton Davis, Charles S. Dutton, Kim Fields, Larnelle Harris, Edwin Hawkins, Tramaine Hawkins, Linda Hopkins, Al Jarreau, Quincy Jones (conductor), Chaka Khan, Gladys Knight, Lizz Lee, Dawnn Lewis, Babbie Mason, Johnny Mathis, Marilyn McCoo, Mike E., Stephanie Mills, Jeffrey Osborne, David Pack, Phylicia Rashād, Joe Sample, Richard Smallwood, Sounds of Blackness, Take 6, Darryl Tookes, Mervyn Warren, Thomas Whitfield, Vanessa Williams, Chris Willis |

== Chart positions ==
=== Album ===
| Year | Chart | Peak |
|---|---|---|
| 1992 | The Billboard 200 | #82 |
| 1992 | Top Gospel Albums | #3 |
| 1992 | Top R&B/Hip-Hop Albums | #11 |
| 1992 | Top Contemporary Christian Albums | #13 |
