= Sheléa =

American singer

Sheléa Frazier
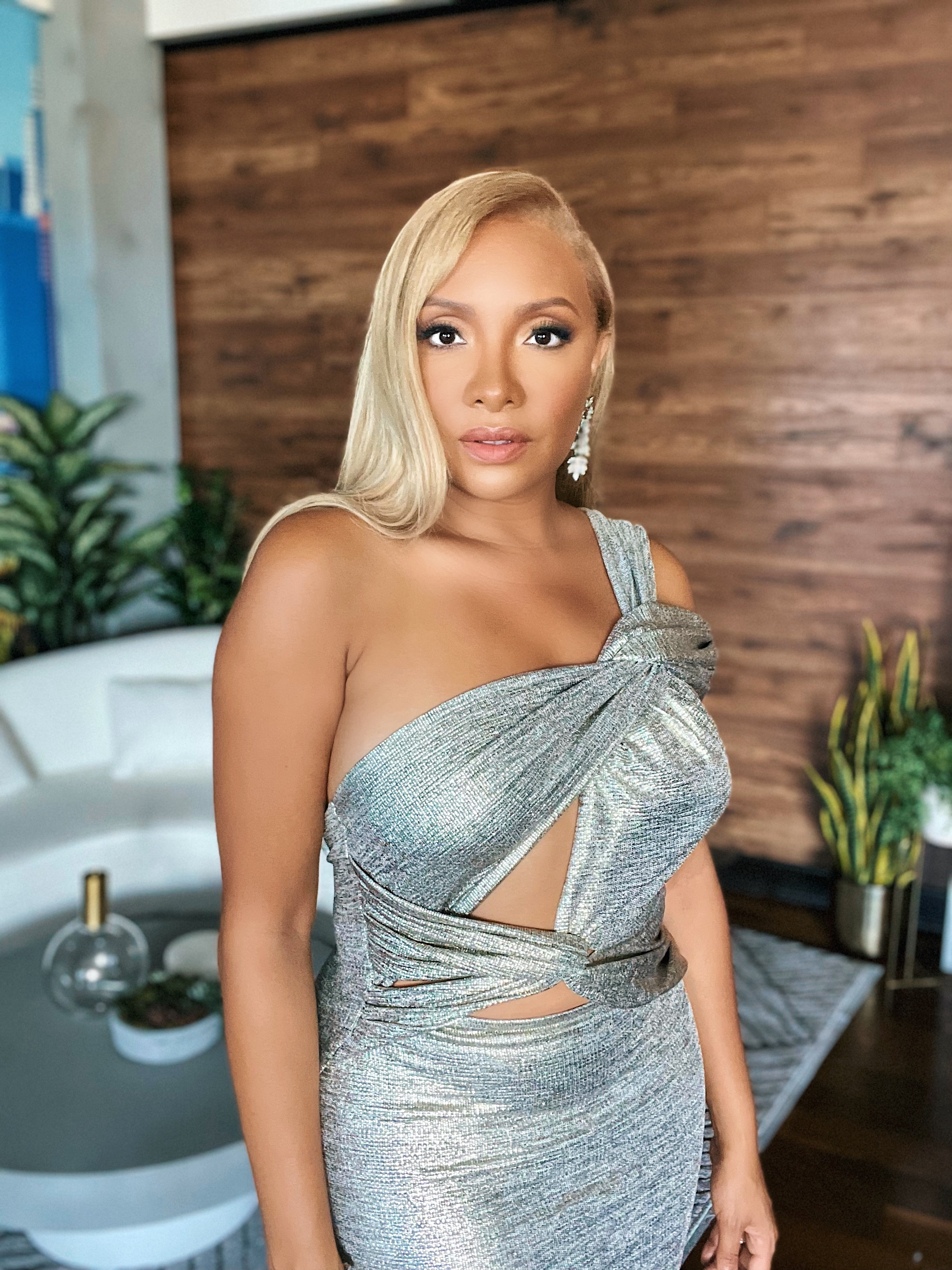
- Sheléa Frazier in September 2022

Background information
- Also known as: Sheléa
- Born: Sheléa Melody Frazier; August 24, 1980 (age 46); Redwood City, California, U.S.
- Origin: Bakersfield, California, U.S.
- Genres: R&B; soul; gospel; jazz
- Occupations: Musician; singer; songwriter
- Years active: 2003–present
- Website: sheleamusic.com

Sheléa Melody Frazier also known as Sheléa (/ʃʔˈleɪə/ shuh-lay-yuh) is an American singer, songwriter, and pianist. Her 2014 track "I'll Never Let You Go" peaked at 23 on Billboard's Adult R&B chart. She is mentored by Stevie Wonder, and is a protégée of Quincy Jones. Sheléa portrays gospel singer Dorinda Clark Cole in the 2020 Lifetime biopic The Clark Sisters: First Ladies of Gospel.

== Life and career ==
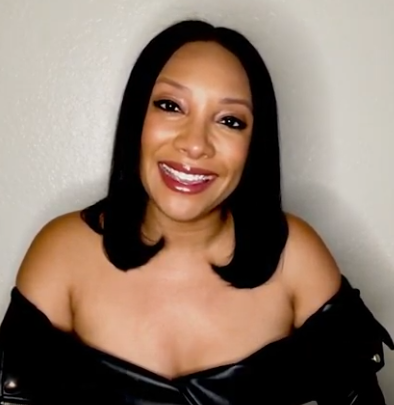
Sheléa in 2020

Sheléa Frazier was born in Redwood City, California, and raised in Bakersfield, California. She has been singing and playing piano since she was a child. She has cited Natalie Cole's album Unforgettable... with Love as the impetus for her desire to become a singer.

Sheléa co-wrote and performed the theme song to the UPN television sitcom All of Us from 2003 to 2006.

Sheléa began her professional career working with producers Jimmy Jam and Terry Lewis. In 2008, she sang lead on the track "Someone to Watch Over Me", at the request of Take 6; the song was nominated for a Grammy. Afterward, Stevie Wonder contacted the singer for collaborations.

Sheléa first gained wider prominence in 2012 after she posted a YouTube video singing a medley of Whitney Houston covers after the singer's death, which went viral. Later that year, she was invited to the White House to sing for the Obamas at the Gershwin Prize presentation. The next year, Sheléa performed a Whitney Houston tribute at the Grammy Museum.

Shelea's debut album, Love Fell On Me, was released in 2013. The track "I'll Never Let You Go" song peaked at 23 on Billboard's Adult R&B chart. She also wrote and performed the 2011 track "Love Fell On Me" for the film Jumping the Broom.

In 2019, she released an album Pretty World. A Tribute to Allen & Marilyn Bergman, which included Stevie Wonder and Kirk Whalum. Later that year, Quincy Jones produced a concert special on PBS featuring the singer, called Quincy Jones Presents: Sheléa. Shelea's performance featured David Foster.

She starred in the 2020 Clark Sisters biopic The Clark Sisters: First Ladies of Gospel as Dorinda Clark-Cole.

=== Mentorship and influences ===
Sheléa is mentored by Stevie Wonder and is a protégée of Quincy Jones. She was a backup singer for Wonder's Songs in the Key of Life Tour in 2014 and 2015. In 2018, she held a two-month residency at Jones' Q's Bar & Lounge in Dubai.

She has stated that Whitney Houston is one of her biggest inspirations.

== Discography ==
=== Albums ===
- 2013: Love Fell on Me
- 2015: You
- 2019: Pretty World. A Tribute to Allen & Marilyn Bergman
- 2022: Love Fell On Me (Remastered)

=== Extended plays ===
- 2019: Don't Wanna Wait 'Til Christmas

=== Soundtracks ===
- 2020: The First Ladies of Gospel: The Clark Sisters Biopic Soundtrack

=== Singles ===
- 2012: Seeing You
- 2012: Don't Want To Wait 'Til Christmas
- 2013: Love the Way You Love Me
- 2013: I'm Sure It's You (The Wedding Song)
- 2013: America the Beautiful
- 2014: I'll Never Let You Go
- 2015: What Are You Doing the Rest of Your Life
- 2018: Moonlight (featuring Kirk Whalum)
- 2018: Pretty World (featuring Stevie Wonder)
- 2019: City of Angels
- 2019: Don't Wanna Wait 'Til Christmas
- 2020: You Are Enough
- 2020: We the People
- 2020: Mary Did You Know
- 2020: Silent Night
- 2021: Grace
- 2022: Final Say

=== Album appearances ===
| Title | Year | Other artist(s) | Album |
|---|---|---|---|
| "Let It Go" | 2006 | Avila Brothers | The Mood: Soundsational |
| "Grandma's Song" | 2008 | —N/a | The Experience: 5th Anniversary Project |
| "Someone to Watch Over Me" | 2008 | Take 6, Roy Hargrove | The Standard |
| "Christmas Time Is Here" | 2010 | Take 6 | The Most Wonderful Time of the Year |
| "Have Yourself a Merry Little Christmas" | 2011 | Nelson Beato | A Gift to You |
| "I Always Win" | 2012 | The Bol Worship Center | Excellence: A Praise and Worship Experience |
| "Human Nature" | 2013 | BWB | Human Nature |
| "Christmas Day" | 2014 | Daniel Rodriguez | A Glorious Christmas |
| "This Will Be (An Everlasting Love)" | 2018 | Dave Koz, Kenny Lattimore | Summer Horns II: From A to Z |
| "I Want Milk" | 2018 | Justin Andrew Wilson, II | LJ's World |
| "Auntie's Heart" | 2018 | Justin Andrew Wilson, II | LJ's World |
| "I Want Jesus" | 2019 | Mark Bunney | Forhym |
| "Star Spangled Banner" | 2019 | Maestro Lightford | Calendar Muzik |
| "Mary Did You Know?" | 2019 | Jonathan Butler | Christmas Together |
| "Love Is" | 2019 | Jonathan Butler | Christmas Together |
| "Have Yourself a Merry Little Christmas" | 2019 | Michael Lington | A Foreign Affair Christmas |
| "The Bodyguard Medley (Live)" | 2019 | David Foster | An Intimate Evening |
| "Silver Bells" | 2019 | Dave Koz, Auburn Road | Cedric the Entertainer & Silas White Present: A Powerbase Christmas |
| "The Prayer Song" | 2020 | Jaden Gray, Joshua Ledet | An Invitation To The Cookout |
| "Catch the Wave" | 2020 | Sergio Mendes | In the Key of Joy |
| "Time Goes By" | 2020 | Sergio Mendes | In the Key of Joy |
