= Join the Band =

Join the Band may refer to:

- Join the Band (Take 6 album), a 1994 album by Take 6
- Join the Band (Little Feat album), a 2008 album by Little Feat
