= He Is Christmas =

Studio album by Take 6
- Released: September 10, 1991
- Genre: Gospel, Christmas
- Label: Reprise • Warner Bros.
- Producer: Take 6

Take 6 chronology
So Much 2 Say (1990)	He Is Christmas (1991)	Join the Band (1994)

Professional ratings
Review scores
Source	Rating
AllMusic	link

He Is Christmas, released in 1991 on Reprise Records under Warner Alliance, is the 1st Christmas album by the American contemporary gospel music group Take 6. It won the 34th annual Grammy Award for Best Jazz Vocal Performance, Duo or Group in 1991.

== Track listing ==
1. "Silent Night"
2. "Oh! He Is Christmas"
3. "Hark! The Herald Angels Sing"
4. "Away in a Manger"
5. "Amen"
6. "The Little Drummer Boy"
7. "'Twas da Nite"
8. "Sweet Little Jesus Boy"
9. "God Rest Ye Merry Gentlemen" (with the Yellowjackets)
10. "O Come, All Ye Faithful"
