= Best of Take 6 =

Greatest hits album by Take 6
- Released: 1995
- Genre: Gospel
- Label: Warner Bros.

Take 6 chronology
Join the Band (1994)	Best of Take 6 (1995)	Brothers (1996)

Best of Take 6, released in 1995 on Warner Bros. Records, is a Gospel music album by the American contemporary Gospel music group Take 6. It was released in Japan where it sold 200,000 units, achieving Japanese Platinum status.

== Track listing ==
1. "Spread Love"
2. "If We Ever"
3. "Get Away, Jordan"
4. "Mary"
5. "So Much 2 Say"
6. "I L-O-V-E U"
7. "I Believe"
8. "Where Do the Children Play?"
9. "Oh! He Is Christmas"
10. "God Rest Ye Merry Gentlemen"
11. "Biggest Part of Me"
12. "You Can Never Ask Too Much (Of Love)"
13. "Why I Feel This Way"
14. "Even Though"
15. "Will Always Love You"
16. "Biggest Part of Me" [Tre and Dave's Hip Hop Mix][*]
