= So Cool =

So Cool may refer to:

- So Cool (band), a Thai rock band
- So Cool (Sistar album), 2011
- So Cool (Take 6 album), 1998
