= So Much 2 Say =

Studio album by Take 6
- Released: August 31, 1990
- Genre: Gospel
- Label: Reprise • Warner Bros.
- Producer: Mervyn Warren; Co-Producer; Alvin Chea; Cedric Dent; Mark Kibble; Claude V. McKnight III; David Thomas; *Producers Take 6

Take 6 chronology
Take 6 (1988)	So Much 2 Say (1990)	He Is Christmas (1991)

Professional ratings
Review scores
Source	Rating
Allmusic	4.5/5 stars

So Much 2 Say, released in 1990 on Reprise Records under Warner Alliance, is a Gospel music album by the American contemporary Gospel music group Take 6. The album appeared on the gospel, jazz, and R&B charts of Billboard magazine. The album or songs on it won two Grammy awards and two Dove awards. The album built on the success of the group's first album by incorporating dialogue-only tracks (tr. 1, 3, 12), sequencing (tr. 4), drum machine (tr. 4), a partial track (tr. 8), and backing band (tr. 13). Track 3 explicitly states that all sounds on track 4 were produced by the human body.

== Track listing ==
1. "[Not Again!?]" - 0:17
2. "So Much 2 Say" - 1:09 (C.Dent, M.Warren - composers and arrangers)
3. "[Human Body]" - 0:15
4. "I L-O-V-E U" - 4:18 (M.Warren, M. Kibble - composers and arrangers)
5. "Something Within Me" - 3:36 (M. Kibble - arranger)
6. "Time After Time (The Savior Is Waiting)" - 4:09 (Ralph Carmichael - composer; M. Warren - arranger)
7. "Come Unto Me" - 3:11 (Omerror Dawson - composer; M. Warren - arranger)
8. "[Pre-Prise: I'm on My Way]" - 0:33
9. "I Believe" * - 4:03 (BeBe Winans/Mark Kibble - composers; M. Kibble - arranger)
10. "Sunday's on the Way" * - 6:12 (Carman - composer; M. Kibble - arranger)
11. "I'm on My Way" - 4:12 (C. Dent - arranger)
12. "[That's the Law]" - 0:38
13. "Where Do the Children Play?" - 4:17 (Claude V. McKnight III/David Thomas - composers; M. Kibble - arranger; C. Dent and D. Thomas - rhythm and horn arr.)

== Personnel ==
Tracks 1–8 and 11–12 were produced by Mervyn Warren, and co-produced by Mark Kibble, Cedric Dent, Alvin Chea, Claude V. McKnight III, and David Thomas. Tracks 9–10 and 13 were produced by the members of Take 6 for this album, Mervyn Warren, Mark Kibble, Cedric Dent, Alvin Chea, Claude V. McKnight III, and David Thomas.

Spanish and Portuguese Coaching on "I'm On My Way" by Sherry Hamblin. Translation of Spanish and Portuguese on "I'm On My Way" by Maria Esquivel, Sherry Hamblin.

For "Where Do The Children Play?": Drums, Percussion – James Blair* Synthesizer [Synclavier] – Matthew Morse

Recorded By – Don Cobb Recorded By [Second Engineer] – John Abbott, John Kunz, Kevin Twit, Mike McCarthy, Robert Charles, Rodney Good Mixed By – Don Cobb, John Abbott Mixed By [Second Engineer] – Greg Parker, Rodney Good, Tim Farmer Mastered By – Denny Purcell Mastered By [Assistant] – Carlos Grier

Art Direction, Design – Laura LiPuma Photography By – Empire Studio

== Awards ==
'So Much 2 Say won "Best Contemporary Soul Gospel Album" at the 33rd annual Grammy Awards in 1990.

The track "Time After Time (The Savior Is Waiting)" had won the Grammy for "Best Gospel Performance – Duo, Group, Choir or Chorus" in 1988, prior to the album's release.

The album won Contemporary Gospel Album at the 1990 GMA Dove Awards.

The track "I L-O-V-E You" won a GMA Dove Award in 1990 for Contemporary Gospel Song.
