= Take 6 (album) =

Studio album by Take 6
- Released: 1988
- Recorded: 1987–1988
- Genre: Gospel
- Length: 36:48
- Label: Warner Alliance • Reprise
- Producers: Alvin Chea; Cedric Dent; Mark Kibble; Claude V. McKnight III; David Thomas; Mervyn Warren

Take 6 chronology
Take 6 (1988)	So Much 2 Say (1990)

Take 6, released in 1988 on Reprise Records under Warner Alliance, is the first album by the American contemporary Gospel music group Take 6. The album won the group their first two Grammy Awards for Best Jazz Vocal Performance by a Duo or Group and Best Soul Gospel Performance by a Duo, Group, Choir or Chorus. It also earned the group their first three Dove Awards for Group of the Year, Contemporary Black Gospel Album of the Year, and Contemporary Black Gospel Song of the Year.

The album Take 6 is often mistakenly thought to be named Doo Be Doo Wop Bop! because that phrase appears on the album cover under the letters of the group's name. The album's legal title is Take 6, and the cover's designer, Kav DeLuxe, has stated the phrase "do be doo wop bop" was included simply as a "design element".

== Background ==
In 1987, Take 6 held an exclusive performance for gospel record company executives. Yet, many refrained from attending, unsure how to market such a musical group. Fortunately, an uninvited representative of Warner Bros, showed up who was impressed with a tape he had received of the group. "When I first played their tape," Jim Ed Norman said, "I heard the most enchanting, wonderful sound in music coming from the human voice that I had heard in the longest time."

Warner Bros, signed Take 6 to a recording contract, and the album was released the following year on the company’s Reprise label. Although the group had originally hoped to sign with a gospel label, they later realized the evangelistic opportunity to reach wider audiences with their jazzed-up gospel music. "We purposely style our music the way we do to make the message more appealing to people who wouldn't ordinarily listen to Christian music," explained original group member Mervyn Warren."

== Track listing ==
1. "Gold Mine" (Mervyn Warren, Claude McKnight) - 3:52
2. "Spread Love" (Mark Kibble, Mervyn Warren, Claude McKnight) - 3:29
3. "If We Ever Needed the Lord Before (We Sure Do Need Him Now)" (Thomas A. Dorsey) - 4:59
4. "A Quiet Place" (Ralph Carmichael) - 2:43
5. "Mary" - 3:31
6. "David and Goliath" - 4:25
7. "Get Away, Jordan" - 4:23
8. "He Never Sleeps" - 3:10
9. "Milky-White Way" - 4:47
10. "Let the Words" (Gail Hamilton) - 00:55

== Personnel ==
- Claude McKnight (track 9), Mark Kibble (tracks 2, 5 to 9), Mervyn Warren (tracks 1 to 4, 10) - arrangements
- David Humphries - finger snaps, sound effects
- Jim Ed Norman - executive producer
- Don Cobb - engineer

== Critical response ==
Professional ratings
Review scores
Source	Rating
Allmusic	(5/5)

The album was critically acclaimed, receiving Grammy Awards in both the jazz and gospel categories. "In a diverse selection of songs, Take 6 merges an a cappella sound with gospel and big-band jazz arrangements... Their harmonies and melodies are consistent throughout this outstanding collection of songs," said Craig Lytle for AMG.
