= Who Would Imagine a King =

Song by Whitney Houston

from the album The Preacher's Wife: Original Soundtrack Album
- Language: English
- Released: 26 November 1996
- Recorded: Early 1996
- Studio: Westlake Recording Studios (Hollywood, CA); Capitol Studios (Los Angeles, CA); Crossway Studios (Mendham, NJ)
- Genre: Christmas, gospel
- Length: 3:31
- Label: Arista
- Songwriters: Mervyn Warren, Hallerin Hilton Hill
- Producers: Whitney Houston, Mervyn Warren

Who Would Imagine a King is a Christmas song written and composed by Mervyn Warren and Hallerin Hilton Hill, and originally recorded and co-produced by Whitney Houston for the soundtrack to the 1996 film, The Preacher's Wife.

In 2009, Lotta Engberg recorded the song on the album Jul hos mig.

In 2010, a cover of the song appeared on Katharine McPhee's Christmas album Christmas Is the Time to Say I Love You.

In 2020, American contemporary Christian singing group Heritage Singers covered this song on their album Home for Christmas.

== Charts ==
=== Whitney Houston version ===
Chart (2011–2020)	Peak position
US Gospel Digital Song Sales (Billboard)	4
US Gospel Streaming Songs (Billboard)	6
