= Feels Good (album) =

Studio album by Take 6
- Released: March 21, 2006
- Genre: Gospel
- Label: Take 6 Records
- Producer: Mark Kibble; Co-producer; David Thomas; *Co-producer; Cedric Dent **producer

Take 6 chronology
Beautiful World (2002)	Feels Good (2006)	The Standard (2008)

Professional ratings
Review scores
Source	Rating
AllMusic	4/5 stars

Feels Good is an album by the American contemporary a cappella vocal jazz and gospel group Take 6, released in 2006. In 2007, the album was nominated for a Dove Award for Contemporary Gospel Album of the Year at the 38th GMA Dove Awards.

It peaked at No. 10 on the Billboard Top Gospel Albums chart.

== Critical reception ==
The Washington Post wrote: "Typical is the catchy lead-off track, David Thomas's 'Come On', which boasts the finger-snapping swing and nicely spread harmonies of a Manhattan Transfer number even as it proselytizes for God."

AllMusic wrote that "the group get back to their roots both musically and spiritually, delivering straightforward inspirational tunes with nothing but their truly remarkable voices."

== Track listing ==
1. "Come On" (David Thomas) 3:48
2. "This Is Another Day" (Andrae Crouch) 3:27
3. "Feels Good" (Mark Kibble, David Thomas) 3:51
4. "Wait for the Sunshine" (John Stoddart) 3:48
5. "Family of Love" (Cedric Dent, Joey Kibble) ** 3:54
6. "More Than Ever" (Hallerin Hilton Hill, Joey Kibble) 4:03
7. "Set U Free" (Claude V. McKnight III) 3:33
8. "Vinterlude" (Alvin Chea) 0:31
9. "Just in Time" (B. Comden, A. Green, J. Styne) * 3:46
10. "Lamb of God" (Twila Paris) * 3:27
11. "I'll Never Turn Back No More" (Public Domain) 1:27
12. "You Can Make It - Go On" (Mark Kibble, Joel Kibble, David Thomas) 3:50
