= The Most Wonderful Time of the Year (Take 6 album) =

Studio album by Take 6
- Released: October 5, 2010
- Genre: Gospel music
- Label: Heads Up

Take 6 chronology
The Standard (2008)	The Most Wonderful Time of the Year (2010)	One (2012)

Professional ratings
Review scores
Source	Rating
All About Jazz	(4/5)

The Most Wonderful Time of the Year, released on October 5, 2010, on Heads Up, is a Gospel music album and also the 3rd Christmas album by the American contemporary Gospel music group Take 6. The album charted in December 2010 for a single week, reaching number 70.

Apart from pianist Vince Guaraldi's piece, "Christmas Time Is Here" (which features pianist/singer Shelea Frazier as a guest), the rest of the album is all sung a cappella.

== Track listing ==
1. "It's the Most Wonderful Time of the Year"
2. "White Christmas
3. "Grinch Introduction/ The Grinch/"You're a Mean One, Mr. Grinch"
4. "Sleigh Ride"
5. "I'll Be Home for Christmas"
6. "It Came Upon a Midnight Clear"
7. "The Sugarplum Dance (Dance of the Sugarplum Fairy)"
8. "I Saw Three Ships"
9. "Jingle Bells"
10. "Christmas Time Is Here" (featuring Shelea Frazier)
