= Brothers (Take 6 album) =

Studio album by Take 6
- Released: October 29, 1996
- Genre: Gospel
- Length: 42:44
- Label: Reprise
- Producer: David Thomas, Les Pierce, Brian McKnight, Cedric Caldwell, Victor Caldwell

Take 6 chronology
Best of Take 6 (1995)	Brothers (1996)	So Cool (1998)

Professional ratings
Review scores
Source	Rating
AllMusic	3/5 stars
JazzTimes	(favourable)

Brothers is an album by the American contemporary gospel group Take 6, issued in 1996 on Reprise Records. The album rose to No. 18 on the Billboard Top Christian Albums chart.

== Critical reception ==
Brothers won a Grammy for Best Contemporary R&B Gospel Album.

== Track listing ==
1. "Sing a Song" (Maurice White, Al McKay)
2. "You Don't Have to Be Afraid" (David Thomas, Les Pierce)
3. "I'll Be There" (Brian McKnight, Claude V. McKnight III)
4. "Delilah" (Brian McKnight, C. McKnight, Mark Kibble)
5. "Chance of a Lifetime" (James Patrick Dunne, Kibble)
6. "Can't Stop Thinking 'Bout You" (Thomas, Pierce, Alvin Chea)
7. "Jesus Makes Me Happy" (Hallerin Hilton Hill)
8. "We Don't Have to Cry" (Brian McKnight, Brandon Barnes)
9. "Do Right" (Paul Davis)
10. "Don't Let Go" (Brian McKnight)
