= The Standard (Take 6 album) =

Studio album by Take 6
- Released: September 30, 2008
- Genre: Jazz
- Length: 45:52
- Label: Heads Up International
- Producer: Mark Kibble; Co-producer; David Thomas; Co-producer; Cedric Dent; Co-producer; Claude V. McKnight III; Co-producer; Khristian Dentley; Executive producer Dave Love

Take 6 chronology
Feels Good (2006)	The Standard (2008)	The Most Wonderful Time Of The Year (2010)

The Standard, released on September 30, 2008, on Heads Up International, is a jazz music album by the American contemporary Gospel music group Take 6.

== Track listing ==
1. "Sweet Georgia Brown" (Maceo Pinkard, Kenneth Casey Sr, Ben Bernie) 3:26
2. "Straighten Up and Fly Right" (featuring George Benson) (Nat King Cole, Irving Mills) 3:22
3. "Seven Steps to Heaven" (featuring Jon Hendricks, Al Jarreau, and Till Brönner) (Miles Davis, Victor Stanley Feldman) 5:27
4. "Windmills of Your Mind" (Alan Bergman, Marilyn Bergman, Michel Legrand) 4:26
5. "Someone to Watch Over Me" (featuring Shelea Frazier and Roy Hargrove) (George Gershwin, Ira Gershwin) 4:23
6. "Grace (Pre-prise)" (Quincy Jones, Jeremy Lubbock) 0:36
7. "Back to You" (Claude V. McKnight III, Victoria Venier) 4:09
8. "A Tisket a Tasket" (featuring Ella Fitzgerald) (Ella Fitzgerald, Van Alexander) 2:36
9. "Bein' Green" (Joe Raposo) 2:03
10. "Do You Know What It Means to Miss New Orleans" (featuring Aaron Neville) (Louis Alter, Edgar DeLange) 2:47
11. "What's Going On" (featuring Brian McKnight) (Renaldo Benson, Al Cleveland, Marvin Gaye) 4:12
12. "Shall We Gather at the River" (Robert Lowry) 3:41
13. "Grace" (Quincy Jones, Jeremy Lubbock) 4:38

== Awards ==
The album was nominated for a Dove Award for Contemporary Gospel Album of the Year at the 40th GMA Dove Awards. Their rendition of the song "Shall We Gather at the River?" was also nominated for Contemporary Gospel Recorded Song of the Year.
