= Join the Band (Take 6 album) =

Studio album by Take 6
- Released: June 28, 1994
- Genre: Gospel
- Label: Reprise
- Producer: Take 6, Vincent Herbert, Les Pierce, David Foster, Brian McKnight, Stevie Wonder

Take 6 chronology
| He Is Christmas (1991) | Join the Band (1994) | Best of Take 6 (1995) |

Professional ratings
Review scores
| Source | Rating |
|---|---|
| AllMusic | 3/5 stars |
| Music Week | 3/5 stars |

Join the Band is an album by the American contemporary gospel music group Take 6, released in 1994. Join the Band won a Grammy Award for Best Contemporary Soul Gospel Album.

== Track listing ==
1. "Can't Keep Goin' On and On"
2. "All I Need (Is a Chance)"
3. "My Friend" (featuring Ray Charles)
4. "It's Gonna Rain"
5. "You Can Never Ask Too Much (Of Love)"
6. "I've Got Life"
7. "Stay Tuned (Interlude)"
8. "Biggest Part of Me"
9. "Badiyah (Interlude)"
10. "Harmony" (featuring Queen Latifah)
11. "4 Miles (Interlude)"
12. "Even Though"
13. "Why I Feel This Way" (featuring Stevie Wonder)
14. "Lullaby"
