= Somebody Bigger than You and I =

Song by Lange, Heath and Burke

Song by Mahalia Jackson

from the album I Believe
- Released: 1960
- Genre: gospel

"Somebody Bigger Than You and I"

Song by Elvis Presley

from the album How Great Thou Art
- Released: February 27, 1967
- Genre: gospel

"Somebody Bigger than You and I" is a song written by Johnny Lange, Hy Heath and Sonny Burke. It is known as a gospel standard.

== Notable recordings ==
- Mahalia Jackson – I Believe (1960)
- Elvis Presley – How Great Thou Art (1967)
- Dionne Warwick – Magic of Believing (1968)
- Whitney Houston featuring Bobby Brown, Faith Evans, Johnny Gill, Monica and Ralph Tresvant – The Preacher's Wife: Original Soundtrack Album (1996)
- Marion Williams
- The Caravans (featuring Josephine Howard)
- Dorothy Love Coates & The Original Gospel Harmonettes featuring Cleopatra Kennedy
- Marco T.: Great Spanish version in 2003
