= So Cool (Take 6 album) =

Studio album by Take 6
- Released: October 27, 1998
- Genre: Gospel
- Label: Reprise
- Producer: Jim Ed Norman

Take 6 chronology
Brothers (1996)	So Cool (1998)	Greatest Hits (1999)

Professional ratings
Review scores
Source	Rating
AllMusic	3/5 stars

So Cool is a gospel music album by the American contemporary gospel music group Take 6, released on October 27, 1998, on Reprise Records.

It peaked at #24 on the Billboard charts. It was nominated for Best Contemporary Soul Gospel Album at the 42nd Annual Grammy Awards.

== Critical reception ==
The Chicago Tribune praised the album, writing: "So Cool may be intimate and celebratory, but it isn't soft; the album comes across as fun, accomplished and smooth, without drifting into the emotionally vacant world of smooth jazz."

== Track listing ==
1. "Intro (A Cappella Is Cool)"
2. "So Cool"
3. "Sonshine"
4. "If You Only Knew"
5. "Wings of Your Prayer"
6. "Fly Away"
7. "You'll Be Waiting for Me"
8. "Nothin' but Love"
9. "Evermore"
10. "Soundcheck # 694 (London)"
11. "Everybody Ought to Know"
12. "A'-Ca-Lud" *
13. "Love and Harmony"
14. "A Few More Miles"

* an a cappella bridge two articles of funk
