= Babbie Mason =

American songwriter

- Born: February 1, 1955 (age 71); Jackson, Michigan, United States
- Genres: Gospel, inspirational
- Occupations: Singer, songwriter, speaker, producer
- Instruments: Keyboards, piano, vocals
- Years active: 1964–present
- Labels: Word, Mason Music Group

Babbie Yvett Robie Wade Mason (born February 1, 1955) is an American gospel music singer, songwriter, author, and adjunct professor of songwriting at Lee University, Trevecca University and Spring Arbor University. Mason is also the television talk-show host of Babbie's House. Born to Georgie and George W. Wade, Mason's father was a Baptist pastor and she hails from at least five generations of ministers. Mason started playing as church pianist in 1964 and was the choir director for the church her father pastored.

== Biography ==
Before becoming a recording artist, Mason was a teacher in Jackson, Michigan. She later relocated to Georgia in 1980 and continued in her teaching profession. In 1984, Mason left teaching and began the first stages of her musical career. In 1985 she received first place honors in both the songwriting and vocal categories at the Christian Artist Music Seminar in the Rockies. In 1989, Mason signed her first record deal with Word Records out of Nashville, Tennessee.

== Career ==
Mason taught music at East Cobb Middle School in Cobb County, Georgia in the early 1980s. She went on to pen chart-topping singles such as "Each One, Reach One", "All In Favor", "Standing In The Gap", and "A World of Difference". Some of her songs have become church standards and songs such as "All Rise," "With All My Heart," and "Hallowed Be Thy Name" can be found among the regular song line ups in weekly church worship services. Her song "All Rise" was one of the most-recorded contemporary Christian songs of the 1990s. Other Gospel and Christian Music artists and groups have recorded her songs, such as Cece Winans, (Holy Spirit Come And Fill This Place), Ron Kenoy (Hallowed Be Thy Name) and The Brooklyn Tabernacle Choir (Jesus, The One And Only). In 1996, the album Heritage of Faith featured an arrangement of "Amazing Grace" which included excerpts from her late father's sermon recordings. The album also highlighted "Stop by the Church," written by Sullivan Pugh. The song earned Mason a Dove Award from the Gospel Music Association and featured a duet with her mother.

In 1999, Mason signed with Spring Hill Music Group and released No Better Place. This project included the single "The House That Love Built," a song she co-wrote with longtime friend and veteran producer Cheryl Rogers. While at Spring Hill Records, Mason also recorded the project, "Right Where You Are", which features the title cut along with the beautiful selection, "Pray On", a heart-felt ballad Mason co-wrote with long-time friend, Donna Douglas.

Mason has always blended pop and contemporary praise, inspirational ballads, Jazz, and soulful gospel into her music style. Mason had longed to record a 1940s-era project à la Billie Holiday and Natalie Cole, in which Spring Hill granted her request and recorded Timeless, a collection of Jazz inspired songs. (2001). Highlights from this collection include "Theme on the 37th (He Can Work It Out)," a song written by Danniebelle Hall, an early Mason influence, "Black and Blue," which was a poignant reflection on racism that Mason wrote with Turner Lawton, and "Play It Again", an upbeat Big Band style number, co-written with long-time friend, Kenn Mann. The project also features the classic encouragement ballad, "Trust His Heart", written by Mason and co-writer, Eddie Carswell of the Christian Music group, New Song.

Mason has performed before U.S. presidents, including Jimmy Carter, Bill Clinton, Gerald Ford and George H.W. Bush, and sung at Billy Graham's evangelistic crusades. Appearing with Bill and Gloria Gaither and their 'Homecoming Friends' at such major annual concert events as Praise Gathering and Jubilate. She has also been featured on several of their best-selling projects, including the Grammy Award–winning Kennedy Center Homecoming (1999). Mason is involved in Christian women's conferences and has been a popular guest on the Women of Faith tour.

Mason has authored nine books, including the USA Today best-seller, "Each One Reach One: Everyday Ways You Can Shine God's Light" (2024). Inspired by her hit song, Each One Reach and published by David. C Cook, the book encourages believers in Christ Jesus, to share their faith through kindness, compassion, and generosity. Other book titles include, "I Am A Daughter of The Most High King" (2016), "Embraced By God: Celebrating Who And Whose You Are" (2012), FaithLift: Put Wings to Your Faith Walk and Soar" (2003), and Treasures of Heaven in the Stuff of Earth (2000). She hosts a television talk show called Babbie's House, which is broadcast on WATC-TV out of Atlanta, Georgia to a national audience as well as throughout Europe, The Caribbean Islands and Africa.

== Community involvement ==
Involved in helping aspiring recording artists and songwriters, Mason annually presents her Babbie Mason Music Conference International. She joined the faculty at Atlanta Christian College in East Point and Lee University in Cleveland, Tennessee, as an adjunct professor teaching songwriting.

== Personal life ==
Mason lives on a farm in Carroll County, Georgia, with her husband of over forty-six years, Charles and their two sons.

== Discography ==
- 1988: Carry On
- 1990: With All My Heart
- 1991: A World of Difference
- 1992: Comfort and Joy
- 1993: Standing in the Gap
- 1996: Heritage of Faith
- 1997: Praise Celebration
- 1999: No Better Place
- 2000: The Finest Hour
- 2001: Timeless
- 2004: Right Where You Are
- 2006: All the Best
- 2007: Everything
- 2013: This I Know for Sure
- 2017: Hymns and Blessings
