= Mervyn Warren =

American songwriter (born 1964)

Background information
- Born: Mervyn Edwin Warren; February 29, 1964 (age 62); Huntsville, Alabama, U.S.
- Genres: Jazz; R&B; pop; gospel; contemporary Christian
- Years active: 1973-present
- Labels: Walt Disney; Varèse Sarabande
- Formerly of: Take 6

Mervyn Edwin Warren (born February 29, 1964) is an American film composer, record producer, conductor, arranger, lyricist, songwriter, pianist, and vocalist. Warren is a five-time Grammy Award winner and a 10-time Grammy Award nominee. Warren has written the underscore and songs for many feature and television films. He has also written arrangements in a variety of musical styles for producers Quincy Jones, David Foster, Arif Mardin, and dozens of popular recording artists, including extensive work on Jones' Back on the Block, Q's Jook Joint, and Q: Soul Bossa Nostra.

Warren has also produced for numerous jazz, pop, R&B, contemporary Christian, and gospel artists, typically arranging those recordings and often performing on them (on piano, keyboards, or vocals), and often writing or co-writing the melodies and lyrics. Warren is best known as an original member of the a cappella vocal group Take 6, for having composed the underscore to the number-1 film The Wedding Planner (2001), for producing and arranging songs for the hit film Sister Act 2 (1993), and for producing and arranging most of the soundtrack to the 1996 Whitney Houston film The Preacher's Wife—the best-selling gospel album of all time.

== Early life and education ==
Warren was born on leap day (February 29) in Huntsville, Alabama. He is the son of Mervyn A. Warren, a university administrator, professor, and author, and Barbara J. Warren, a university professor who specialized in early childhood education. His mother taught him reading and math when he was three years old, which enabled him to complete the first and second grades in one year. Upon beginning the third grade, his classmates, thinking he had "skipped" a grade, taunted and ostracized him for the next several years. During that time, he immersed himself in playing the piano, which he had begun under his mother's tutelage at the age of five. He took piano lessons briefly between the ages of 6 and 10, but lost interest, preferring improvising to memorization. Because his parents are Seventh-day Adventists, he was forbidden from listening to pop music or rhythm and blues. He was punished at the age of twelve when he got caught with a copy of the album Gratitude by Earth, Wind & Fire. Instead he listened to easy-listening, contemporary Christian, classical, choral music, the Mantovani Orchestra, Edwin Hawkins, and the Swingle Singers. He grew up near Oakwood University, where he saw ensembles perform. At fifteen, he enrolled in a summer program at Alabama A&M University for high school students who excelled at math and science. In 1981 he was valedictorian at Oakwood Adventist Academy, then a few months later entered Oakwood University. He graduated in 1985 with a degree in music. Two years later he received a master's degree in arranging from the University of Alabama, having studied with Steve Sample Sr.

== Early musical career ==
At the age of five, Warren began playing the piano by ear, after being taught a few songs by his mother. Thereafter, for many years he immersed himself in the piano, learning to play various styles by ear and creating new arrangements of existing pieces. As early as the age of seven, he was accompanying vocalists at the piano for their performances at school or church. He soon became sought after as an accompanist in the community and throughout college and graduate school.

At the age of 10, Warren became the regular accompanist for a vocal group composed of five of his female classmates where they performed regularly at school and community events. Within weeks of becoming their accompanist, Warren began creating original arrangements for the group.

When he was 12, he was asked by a classmate if he had ever considered composing an original song. Though Warren had not previously considered doing so, the suggestion prompted him to begin composing original songs and lyrics which he taught to the vocal group and which they performed publicly.

Warren had an innate inclination toward jazz and complex harmony, which was evident in both his original songs and arrangements of existing songs. This propensity was met with disdain by some of the more conservative members of the Oakwood community, resulting in an ongoing struggle between figures of authority and Warren. At the age of 13, Warren expanded the five-voice, female vocal group to a nine-voice, mixed vocal group. This group, The Symbolic Sounds, sang his arrangements and compositions exclusively, and remained popular in the school and community through 1981.

Warren's first professional recording session was for a new version of "The Lord's Prayer", set to an original melody, which Warren co-wrote with his friend Eric Todd. It was recorded by Blessed Peace, a popular gospel choir at Oakwood University, at the Sound Cell Recording Studio in Huntsville, Alabama. Warren created the vocal arrangement, played keyboards, and assisted Todd with the overall production. During that session, studio-owner Doug Jansen Smith, took note of Warren's abilities. Soon, Warren became a regular session-performer at Sound Cell, contributing to arrangements, playing keyboards, and singing on the radio and TV while performing pop, rock, country, and contemporary Christian recordings.

Many of those sessions included Warren's friend Mark Kibble, also an accomplished arranger, pianist, and vocalist (and future member of Take 6). As early as the age of 13, Warren and Kibble had performed concerts together, singing solos and duets, while taking turns providing accompaniment at the piano. One of the duets began with Warren singing and Kibble at the piano; then, halfway through the song, Warren would leave the stage and take over at the piano, at which point Kibble would take the stage to sing.

In 1980, while both juniors in high school, Warren and Kibble joined a preexisting, male a cappella vocal quartet, at Oakwood University. The resulting sextet became known as Alliance. Alliance became known for its highly unique and complex vocal arrangements, primarily of well-known negro spirituals. Most of Alliance's dazzling arrangements were created by Mark Kibble, but later on, Warren contributed as well. Alliance was very popular and performed not only on the campus of Oakwood University, but in various cities across the United States. In 1983, Alliance recorded an album at Sound Cell Recording Studio, entitled Something Within for Legacy Records, a custom label founded by Henry Mosley, then-professor at Oakwood University. Mosley also served as the group's manager. Later, an unmarked, cassette copy of Something Within was given by recording artist Michael Martin Murphey to Jim Ed Norman at Warner Bros. Records in Nashville, Tennessee. Norman loved the recording, but neither he nor Murphey knew the identity of the performers. In 1987, Norman finally discovered the group's identity, and promptly signed Alliance to a recording contract with Reprise Records, a division of Warner Bros. Records. Upon discovering that a rock music band had already recorded under the name "Alliance", the vocal group Alliance was renamed Take 6. They then released the album Take 6 and went on to earn worldwide acclaim.

In 1981, Warren enrolled at Oakwood University and joined the highly regarded touring choir The Aeolians, under the direction of Professor Alma Blackmon. Warren remained a member of The Aeolians throughout his four-year matriculation, later becoming the ensemble's stage director, assistant conductor, and alternate accompanist. With The Aeolians, Warren toured extensively throughout the United States, Bermuda, The Bahamas, The Virgin Islands, England, Scotland, and Wales.

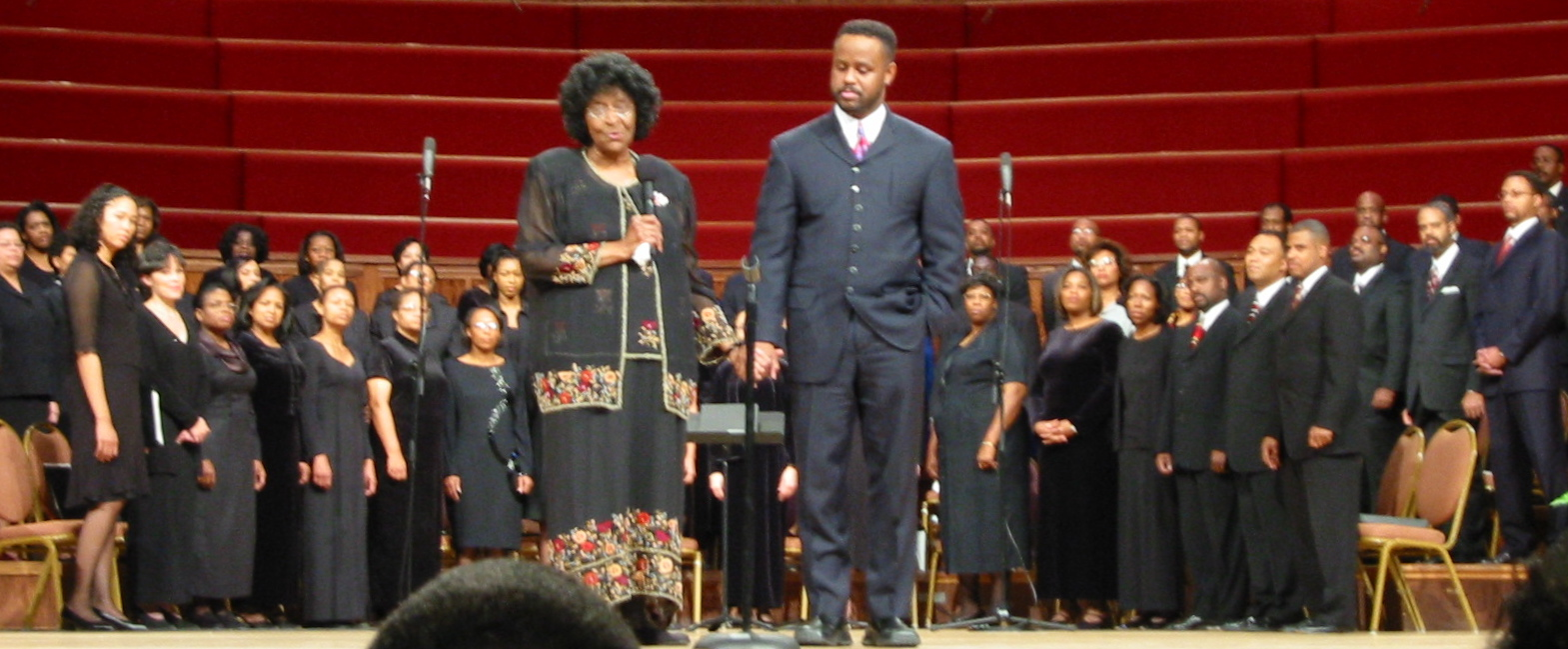
Alma Blackmon, Mervyn Warren, & The Aeolians in 2002

In 1985, Warren composed an upbeat choral piece entitled "I Ain't Got Long To Be Here" in the style of a negro spiritual. Blackmon allowed Warren to teach the piece to The Aeolians, and it became part of their standard repertoire. Whenever they performed it, Blackmon introduced Warren, who would then conduct the piece. "I Ain't Got Long To Be Here" is believed to be the first student composition ever to have been performed by The Aeolians.

Blackmon was a pivotal figure in Warren's musical development. With Blackmon's tutelage, Warren studied music theory, piano performance, and techniques of choral conducting. By coincidence, as a teenager, Warren lived in his parents' home which was located directly across the street from the Blackmon home and her daughter Brenda, now Brenda Wood. As of 2010, Wood is an NBC news anchor at WXIA-TV in Atlanta, Georgia.

== A Special Blend ==
Many members of The Aeolians also sang in other vocal groups and choirs at Oakwood University. However, because of The Aeolians' rigorous rehearsal and touring schedule, conductor Alma Blackmon had instituted a rule that no members of the ensemble could participate in extracurricular groups larger than a quartet. This was intended to limit the number of students who might collectively miss any given Aeolian performance. As such, Warren's nine-voice vocal group, The Symbolic Sounds, was disallowed.

In 1981, Warren disbanded The Symbolic Sounds and formed the vocal group A Special Blend, consisting of two women and two men, accompanied by Warren on piano or sometimes along with a full rhythm section. He created innovative vocal arrangements for A Special Blend, whose repertoire consisted of new arrangements of familiar songs, as well as original compositions by Warren. The group's core members consisted of Joya Foster, Lori Bryan, Mark Kibble, and Claude V. McKnight, III. Like Alliance, A Special Blend became well-known and popular for its unique style which combined vocal jazz with contemporary Christian lyrics. A Special Blend performed concerts throughout the United States, primarily on weekends during the school year. Warren, Kibble, and McKnight were members of both A Special Blend and Alliance. The groups' take on vocal jazz complimented each other and they frequently concertized in tandem.

At certain points during A Special Blend's six-year span, vocalists Andraetta Huff, Sheryl Bihm, and Michelle Mayne each briefly served as members or alternate members.

In reality, neither A Special Blend nor Alliance complied with Blackmon's "Rule of Four." However, she granted an exception for A Special Blend, since they were technically a quartet that Warren accompanied at the piano. Alliance, on the other hand, was in clear violation of the rule, but Warren, along with Mark Kibble and Claude V. McKnight, III, continued to perform with Alliance surreptitiously. Although Kibble and McKnight also sang with The Aeolians, they ended the arrangement after one year. Warren remained a member of The Aeolians throughout his four-year matriculation.

In 1982, A Special Blend won the first-place trophy at the Alabama State Fair's talent competition.

In 1983, A Special Blend recorded a collection of several songs at Sound Cell Studio to serve as a demo to help the group acquire a recording contract. Like Alliance, A Special Blend caught the attention of Henry Mosley, who ultimately became the group's manager.

In 1984 A Special Blend recorded an album entitled Nowhere But Up which Warren produced. The album was recorded at a studio in Nashville, Tennessee for release on Mosley's Legacy Records. To attend sessions, Warren, the group, and band members, made the 100-mile trip many times—often departing for Nashville after the day's classes, recording for a few hours, then returning to Huntsville after midnight, just in time for the next morning's classes. Despite Oakwood University's rich tradition of vocal groups, Nowhere But Up was the first student album to feature a full rhythm section plus orchestration including a string ensemble, a big band, a pop horn section, synthesizers, and exotic percussion, all of which Warren arranged, though he had no formal training in orchestral writing. Upon its release, Nowhere But Up caused quite a stir within Oakwood University's rather conservative community. While a small number of the most conservative faculty members expressed discontent with the album's decidedly jazzy style, the project was overall highly celebrated by students, faculty, and enthusiasts both within the Oakwood community and around the United States. Only a few thousand copies of Nowhere But Up were pressed, and it is today considered a collector's item. As of 2010, there are discussions of a possible re-release of the album on the iTunes Store on their 30th anniversary of the group's formation.

A Special Blend often joined Warren at Sound Cell Studio to sing jingles or commercials or even provide background vocals for other artists' recordings. These recordings ran the gamut from country and pop to "easy listening" and contemporary Christian music. The group also performed background vocals on stage for recording artist Bob Bailey, during his live concert at Oakwood.

In 1985, during a trip to California, A Special Blend performed at gospel-music legend Walter Hawkins' Love Center in Oakland. Aside from Hawkins and his brother, the equally celebrated Edwin Hawkins, the concert was attended by gospel-music legend Danniebelle Hall, who was very celebrated by Warren. In fact, A Special Blend's repertoire included a unique arrangement of a Danniebelle Hall New Orleans jazz-styled piece entitled "Theme On The Thirty-Seventh", which A Special Blend performed to Hall's delight. After the group's performance, Walter Hawkins took the stage and playfully expressed that he had not noticed A Special Blend performing any Walter Hawkins songs. From the audience, Hall replied—tongue firmly planted in cheek—"Well, if you'd write something decent, they would."

In 1986, Warren traveled to Toronto, Canada to see the Manhattan Transfer in concert. Afterward, he waited at the backstage door and upon the group's exit presented them with copies of Nowhere But Up. Over the years, A Special Blend had in fact been compared to the Manhattan Transfer. Some months later, while completing his master's degree at the University of Alabama, Warren received a surprise phone call from Janis Siegel of the Manhattan Transfer asking if he had heard from the Recording Academy. Siegel explained that members of the Manhattan Transfer had submitted Nowhere But Up for a Grammy Award nomination. Because the album was a small, independent release, it had not reached enough members of the Recording Academy to earn a Grammy nomination. However, Warren and A Special Blend would remain forever grateful for the Transfer's magnanimous gesture. Years later, perhaps in an effort to pay them back, Warren would write several arrangements for the Manhattan Transfer.

== Take 6 ==
In 1980, Warren became a member of the a cappella sextet Alliance. In 1987 they signed with Warner Bros. Records, moved to Nashville, Tennessee, changed their name to Take 6, and achieved worldwide fame by 1988. Warren produced or co-produced most of their first two albums: Take 6 and So Much 2 Say. He also arranged and co-wrote many of the included songs. Along with the group he won his first of four Grammy Awards.

Warren's years with Take 6 were characterized by a flurry of appearances, performances, recordings, and travel. Take 6 performed many concerts and embarked upon several concert tours which were typically to sold-out audiences both in the United States and abroad. In 1988, opening for singer Andy Williams, Take 6 toured approximately 12 U.S. cities. In 1989, Take 6 toured 40 U.S. cities, opening for jazz legend Al Jarreau. In subsequent years, Take 6 headlined their own concerts and tours throughout the United States, the UK, Europe, and Japan. Take 6 also performed at a number of well-known events, venues, and jazz festivals including Radio City Music Hall, Carnegie Hall, The Hollywood Bowl, The Special Olympics, The Monterey Jazz Festival, and The Playboy Jazz Festival. Occasionally Take 6 shared billing with other popular contemporary-Christian recording artists such as The Winans, BeBe & CeCe Winans, and Commissioned.

The popularity of Take 6 also led to collaborations with established artists. In fact, it was through Take 6 that Warren first met Quincy Jones establishing a musical friendship that would last for decades. Take 6 performed on several songs and interludes on Jones' album Back on the Block. In addition to performing with the group and contributing to their vocal arrangements, Warren is the featured voice on "Setembro (Brazilian Wedding Song)", and he penned the lyrics for "The Verb To Be (Introduction to Wee B. Dooinit)." Jones also invited Warren to be a featured vocalist on the song "The Secret Garden (Sweet Seduction Suite)." Unfortunately, for personal reasons, Warren had to decline the invitation. Since then, Warren has characterized it as "one of the very few decisions in my life that I truly regret." In the years to follow, Warren has arranged, produced, or co-produced numerous songs for various Jones projects.

In 1989, Take 6 recorded the song "Don't Shoot Me," for the Spike Lee film Do the Right Thing. Warren produced the recording and co-wrote "Don't Shoot Me" with Lee and with group-members Claude V. McKnight, III and David Thomas.

That same year, Take 6 recorded background vocals on the Don Henley album, The End of the Innocence. The collaboration had been requested as a personal favor by Jim Ed Norman, then-president of Warner Bros. Records. Norman and Henley were longtime friends; Norman previously produced many recordings by Henley's band The Eagles.

Other notable Take 6 collaborations include recordings with Johnny Mathis, Stephanie Mills, Melba Moore, Joe Sample, Dino Kartsonakis, k.d. lang, and composer Steve Dorff.

During Warren's tenure, Take 6 recorded music videos for three songs: "Spread Love," "I L-O-V-E U," and "Ridin' The Rails," which was their collaboration with k.d. lang for the 1990 film Dick Tracy. During the same period, Take 6 also recorded theme music for the television show Murphy Brown, Oprah Winfrey's television miniseries The Women of Brewster Place, and commercials for Burger King and Mitsubishi.

During this period, Take 6 also performed live on numerous television shows: 31st Grammy Awards, Good Morning America, The Today Show, David Sanborn's Good Evening, The Arsenio Hall Show, The Tonight Show, Saturday Night Live, and Late Show with David Letterman. Furthermore, Take 6 also performed The National Anthem at the 1988 World Series.

In 1991, Warren left Take 6 to become a full-time record producer, songwriter, arranger and film composer.

== Music career in Nashville ==
Between recording sessions and tours with Take 6, Warren produced, wrote songs, and made arrangements for other musicians. Producer Greg Nelson even became a mentor to him. In 1991, after leaving Take 6, Warren remained in Nashville where he worked with Yolanda Adams, First Call, Larnelle Harris, James Ingram, Babbie Mason, Cindy Morgan, Sandi Patty, The Richard Smallwood Singers, Thomas Whitfield, and Bebe & Cece Winans. In 1990, he produced two tracks on the Donna McElroy album Bigger World. The arrangement for "Come Sunday," was a collaboration with Cedric Dent of Take 6. Warren and Dent received a Grammy Award nomination for the arrangement.

== Interpreting Handel ==
In 1991, Warren was hired to arrange and produce an interpretation of the 1741 oratorio Messiah by George Frideric Handel that incorporated African-American music. He arranged and produced seven of the sixteen tracks of Handel's Messiah: A Soulful Celebration, which included spirituals, blues, ragtime, swing, jazz fusion, rhythm and blues, gospel, and hip-hop. The album received the Grammy Award for Best Contemporary Soul Gospel Album and the Dove Award for Contemporary Gospel Album of the Year. Handel's Messiah: A Soulful Celebration has been officially recognized by Handel Hendrix House, the Handel museum in London, England.

== Film and music career in Los Angeles ==
In 1993 Warren was hired to compose music for the film Sister Act 2: Back in the Habit. Although he intended to return to Nashville, job offers compelled him to remain in Los Angeles. He has composed and conducted orchestral scores for film and television; he has also written, produced, and arranged songs for Ron Fair, David Foster, and Quincy Jones; and he has performed and recorded as a musician. He composed the entire original tracksound for the movie A Walk to remember, and produced the track "Ligthhouse", performed by Mandy Moore. He collaborated with Jeff Marx on "You Have More Friends Than You Know" for the It Gets Better organization. The song appeared on the television program Glee on April 18, 2013.

== Awards and honors ==
=== Grammy Awards and nominations ===
Year	Category	Title	Genre	Result
1997	Best R&B Album	The Preacher's Wife Soundtrack—Whitney Houston	Various	Nominee
1994	Best Instrumental Arrangement Accompanying Vocals	"Ability to Swing"—Patti Austin	Jazz	Nominee
1992	Best Contemporary Soul Gospel Album	Handel's Messiah: A Soulful Celebration	Various	Winner
1992	Best Instrumental Arrangement Accompanying Vocals	"Why Do the Nations So Furiously Rage?"—Al Jarreau	Jazz	Nominee
1990	Best Contemporary Soul Gospel Album	So Much 2 Say – Take 6	Jazz/Gospel	Winner
1990	Best Instrumental Arrangement Accompanying Vocals	"Come Sunday"—Donna McElroy	Jazz	Nominee
1989	Best Gospel Performance by a Duo, Group, or Chorus	"The Savior Is Waiting"—Take 6	Jazz/Gospel	Winner
1988	Best Jazz Vocal Performance by a Duo or Group	"Spread Love"—Take 6	Jazz	Winner
1988	Best Soul Gospel Performance by a Duo, Group, Choir, or Chorus	Take 6 (album)—Take 6	Jazz/Gospel	Winner
1988	Best New Artist	Take 6	Jazz/Gospel	Nominee

=== Soul Train Award ===
Year	Category	Title	Genre	Result
1989	Best Gospel Album	Take 6	Jazz/Gospel	Winner

=== NAACP Image Award nominations ===
Year	Category	Title	Genre	Result
1993	Outstanding Gospel Artist	Various Artists, Handel's Messiah: A Soulful Celebration	Various	Nominee
1988	Outstanding Gospel Artist	Take 6	Jazz/Gospel	Nominee

=== Dove Awards and nominations (10) ===
Year	Category	Title	Genre	Result
2008	Contemporary Gospel Recorded Song of the Year	"Be the Miracle" • Evan Almighty Soundtrack (Room for Two)	Pop/Gospel	Nominee
1992	Contemporary Black Gospel Album of the Year	Handel's Messiah: A Soulful Celebration (Various Artists)	Various	Winner
1990	Contemporary Black Gospel Album of the Year	So Much 2 Say (Take 6)	Jazz/Gospel	Winner
1990	Contemporary Black Gospel Song of the Year	"I L-O-V-E U" (Take 6)	R&B/Gospel	Winner
1990	Song of the Year	"I L-O-V-E U"	R&B/Gospel	Nominee
1990	Group of the Year	Take 6	Jazz/Gospel	Nominee
1990	Traditional Black Gospel Song of the Year	"Something Within Me" (Take 6)	Gospel	Nominee
1988	Group of the Year	Take 6	Jazz/Gospel	Winner
1988	Contemporary Black Gospel Album of the Year	Take 6 (Take 6)	Jazz/Gospel	Winner
1988	Contemporary Black Gospel Song of the Year	"If We Ever" (Take 6)	Jazz/Gospel	Winner

=== Stellar Awards ===
Year	Category	Title	Genre	Result
1988	Best New Artist	Take 6	Jazz/Gospel	Winner
1988	Best Performance by a Duo or Group, Contemporary	Take 6	Jazz/Gospel	Winner
