= Georgia Mass Choir =

- Also known as: Georgia Mass
- Origin: Macon, Georgia; United States
- Genre: Christian
- Years active: 1983 - Present
- Label: Savoy Records

The Georgia Mass Choir is an American Gospel music choir from Macon, Georgia.

== Early years ==
The ensemble, which numbers 150 members, was founded in 1983 by Rev. Milton Biggham, the lead vocalist and songwriter for the group. He put together the group from over 600 applicants, and recorded with them on his label Savoy Records in the middle of the decade. In 1996 the ensemble appeared in the Whitney Houston movie The Preacher's Wife and performed at the 1996 Olympic Games.

== Discography ==
- Yes, He Can (1983) U.S. Gospel #5
- I'm Going to Hold Out (1984) U.S. Gospel #10
- I'm Free (1986) U.S. Gospel #14
- We've Got the Victory (1988) U.S. Gospel #3
- Hold On, Help Is on the Way (1989) U.S. Gospel #4
- I Sing Because I'm Happy (1992) U.S. Gospel #2
- Lord Take Me Through (1995) U.S. Gospel #13
- Greatest Hits (1996) U.S. Gospel #9
- They That Wait (1999) U.S. Gospel #29
- Present Youth for Christ (1999)
- I Owe You Praise (2002) U.S. Gospel #9
- Tell It (2007) U.S. Gospel #7
- I Still Have A Praise (2012)
