= The Preacher's Wife =

- Theatrical release poster
- Directed by: Penny Marshall
- Written by: Nat Mauldin; Allan Scott
- Based on: The Bishop's Wife; 1947 screenplay by: Leonardo Bercovici; Robert E. Sherwood; The Bishop's Wife 1928 novella by; Robert Nathan
- Produced by: Samuel Goldwyn Jr.
- Starring: Denzel Washington; Whitney Houston; Courtney B. Vance; Gregory Hines; Jenifer Lewis; Loretta Devine
- Cinematography: Miroslav Ondříček
- Edited by: George Bowers; Stephen A. Rotter
- Music by: Hans Zimmer
- Production companies: Touchstone Pictures; The Samuel Goldwyn Company; Parkway Productions; Mundy Lane Entertainment
- Distributed by: Buena Vista Pictures Distribution
- Release date: December 13, 1996 (USA)
- Running time: 124 minutes
- Country: United States
- Language: English
- Box office: $57 million

The Preacher's Wife is a 1996 American Christmas fantasy comedy-drama film directed by Penny Marshall and starring Denzel Washington, Whitney Houston and Courtney B. Vance. It is a remake of the 1947 film The Bishop's Wife, which in turn was based on the 1928 novel of the same name by Robert Nathan.

It was nominated for the Academy Award for Best Original Musical or Comedy Score. The film was nominated for six NAACP Image Awards, including Outstanding Motion Picture, and won two—for Outstanding Actress in a Motion Picture (Whitney Houston) and Outstanding Supporting Actress in a Motion Picture (Loretta Devine). In addition, the film won two awards at the Movieguide Awards, including the Epiphany Award for Most Inspiring Movie and the Best Movie for Families Award.

Houston recorded the movie soundtrack and it became the best-selling gospel album of all time, with over 6 million copies worldwide.

== Plot ==
A voiceover by the preacher's son Jeremiah Biggs guides the viewer through the film.

Reverend Henry Biggs is the pastor of a small struggling African American Baptist church in a poverty-stricken neighborhood of New York City. Membership is declining, Henry is pulled in a hundred directions by his parishioners' needs, and the church's finances are in trouble. Henry is under intense pressure from real estate developer Joe Hamilton to sell the church's property so that Hamilton can build luxury condominiums on the site. Henry has also become neglectful of his wife Julia and his son Jeremiah. Julia worries that her marriage is failing. Unsure that he can make a difference in his parishioners' lives and beginning to lose his faith, Henry prays to God for help, which comes in the form of Dudley, a witty and debonair angel. Dudley tells Henry that he is an angel sent by God to help him, but Henry is deeply suspicious of Dudley. Julia, however, is instantly charmed by the handsome and unflappable angel.

With Christmas approaching, Henry's schedule becomes increasingly burdensome, and Dudley begins to spend most of his time with Julia and Jeremiah. Henry's secretary Beverly becomes comically defensive and aggressive, believing Dudley is there to take her job. Julia's wasp-tongued mother, Margueritte is also suspicious of Dudley, because she believes the newcomer will break up her daughter's marriage. Dudley and Julia go ice skating, and then later spend an evening in the jazz club where Julia once performed. After Henry confronts Dudley, Dudley realizes that he is falling in love with Julia. So, Dudley turns his attention to Hamilton and manages to disrupt his schemes to get Henry to sell the church. Henry now realizes that his family is the most important thing in his life, and he resolves to be a better husband and father. At the church's Christmas pageant, Henry finds his faith in God renewed and ties to his family restored.

With his work done, Dudley gives the Biggs family a fully decorated Christmas tree with a Christmas angel resembling himself on top of it as a gift. Dudley then erases all memories of himself from everyone he has met, and although he attends morning service on Christmas Eve, no one recognizes him. However, Jeremiah, who has the faith of a child, still remembers Dudley, and wishes him a merry Christmas.

== Cast ==
- Whitney Houston as Julia Coleman Biggs
- Denzel Washington as Dudley
- Courtney B. Vance as Reverend Henry Biggs
- Justin Pierre Edmund as Jeremiah Biggs
- Gregory Hines as Joe Hamilton
- Jenifer Lewis as Margueritte Coleman
- Loretta Devine as Beverly
- Lionel Richie as Bristloe
- Paul Bates as Saul Jefferies
- Lex Monson as Osbert
- Darvel Davis Jr. as Hakim
- William James Stiggers Jr. as Billy Eldridge
- Marcella Lowery as Anna Eldridge
- Cissy Houston as Mrs. Havergal
- Victor Williams as Robbie
- Shyheim as Teen
- Aaron A. McConnaughey as Teen
- Harsh Nayyar as Christmas Tree Man
- Shari Headley as Arlene Chattan (uncredited)

The Georgia Mass Choir

- Mozelle Hawkins Allen
- Eloise Beasley
- Yolanda Beasley-Prime
- Cassondra M. Breedlove
- Dirk Chaney
- Brenda J. Childs
- Anthony Dean Copeland
- Hayward Cromartie
- Betty Cromartie Davis
- Valerie Inez Edwards
- Kimberly M. Garrett
- Rutha Mae Harris
- Carolyn Henry
- Gary Nuckles-Holt
- Teretha G. Houston
- Angela L. Jones
- Morris Vernon Jones
- Rose Merry Jordan
- Jacqueline Martin
- Betty Matthews
- Rev. Corey McGee
- NaGuanda Miller
- Sharon A. Mitchell
- Beverly S. Nixon
- Krishna Presha
- Jacqulyn V. Saunders
- Constance Small
- Troy L. Sneed Sr.
- Rev. Lawrence K. Thomas
- Ulisa A. Thomas
- V. Ronaldo Welcome
- Berta J. Williams
- Kimberly L. Wright

== Production ==
The motion picture was developed by Denzel Washington's Mundy Lane Entertainment. The screenplay was written by Nat Mauldin and Allan Scott. Credits are given to Robert E. Sherwood and Leonardo Bercovici for the 1947 film The Bishop's Wife, and to author Robert Nathan (for his novel The Bishop's Wife).

The role of Julia was written with Whitney Houston in mind. Denzel Washington says that he first considered Julia Roberts for the role, but quickly turned to Whitney Houston. Houston admitted that she was reluctant to accept, feeling she could not do justice to a role that required her to play a dowdy housewife. Only after reading the script a second time and seeing parallels between her own life and the role of Julia did Houston accept. Houston was paid $10 million to appear in the film, making her the highest paid black actress at the time and third highest paid film actress of 1996.

The Preacher's Wife was the third film produced by Washington's company Mundy Lane Entertainment. For Washington, the movie was a meaningful project due to its message about the value of family, community, and faith. Moreover, as Washington reflected to Variety magazine, the film provided opportunities for those underrepresented in show business:

"I’m happy to know that on a film like ‘Devil in a Blue Dress’ we put 100 or so many black people to work, and it was the same with ‘The Preacher’s Wife,’ [Washington] said. “And it will be the same thing with other films that I’m involved in, whether I’m on a producer level or not. We do it because they’re capable and because nobody else is necessarily looking out for them,” he says of African-American talent.

Filming began in early January 1996. Trinity United Methodist Church in Newark, New Jersey, served as the Biggs' New York City church. The production leased the church, and began renovating it in February 1996. The interior was painted, new carpet laid, and the main doors repaired. The production team designed a pulpit and altar rails that more accurately reflected the design of Baptist churches. After filming, the church kept the pulpit, and the production crew worked with architects from the United Methodist Church to design and install rails more fitting of the Methodist style. Filming occurred there from March 11 to April 3, with about a quarter of the church's membership hired as extras. (The church used the rental fees paid by the production to replace its boiler and HVAC system.)

Production was plagued by poor weather and accidents. Interior sets were constructed at Chelsea Piers, a film and television production facility in Manhattan, New York. Severe snowstorms in New Jersey (where scenes were shot in Paterson) and New York (where scenes were shot throughout New York City) cost the production several shooting days. Later, the cast and crew moved to Portland, Maine, to scenes which occur at an ice skating rink, but unseasonably warm weather turned the ice to water and forced the production to rent snow-making machines. The production filmed in several crime-ridden areas of New York City to achieve authenticity. Robberies were common in the area, leaving the cast and crew nervous. While filming exteriors and interiors at a church and parsonage in Yonkers, New York, a building a block away caught fire and two children died. One crew member rushed a ladder from the production to the burning building, and saved the life of a four-year-old child. Accidents also affected the production. The weekend before filming began at the church, an elderly parishioner fell, broke her hip and died. In the middle of filming, a crew member was struck by a car and killed. The production schedule was also impacted by Houston's decision only to shoot scenes with vocal performances during the afternoon.

Filming was scheduled to wrap at the end of February, but the crew was still shooting at the beginning of May. Some final scenes shot were those at the Main Street Cafe in Tarrytown, New York. The entire street had to be dressed for Christmas in fake snow laid down along the street.

Lionel Richie made his acting debut in the film as the owner of the jazz club.

== Soundtrack ==
The Preacher's Wife is the best-selling gospel album of all time. The album also remained at number-one for a record twenty-six weeks on the Billboard Top Gospel Albums Chart. The Georgia Mass Choir appears in the film. The soundtrack to the film (performed by Whitney Houston) consists of gospel numbers and includes performances by Monica, Faith Evans, the three members of New Edition who embarked on solo careers (Bobby Brown, who was Houston's real-life husband at the time, Ralph Tresvant and Johnny Gill), Cissy Houston and Shirley Caesar among others. Houston sang Richard Smallwood's I Love the Lord in the film. A favorite song of hers since childhood, it gained renewed popularity when it was heard in the film.

== Reception ==
Stephen Holden, writing for The New York Times, called the film "sweetly uplifting" and "a shrewdly conceived update", and had high praise for actress Jenifer Lewis and the funny scene where the children in the Christmas pageant cannot recall their lines. Kevin Thomas of the Los Angeles Times also found the film "warm, sentimental, amusing yet serious" and an "inspired reworking" of the 1947 original. He singled out Penny Marshall's directing for being "consistently wise and judicious", and praised Jenifer Lewis and Loretta Devine. Critic Roger Ebert gave the film 3 out of 4 stars, but was a bit equivocal in his review, concluding: "The Preacher's Wife is a sweet and good-hearted comedy about the holiday season. ... This movie could have done more, but what it does, it makes you feel good about."

Duane Byrge, writing for The Hollywood Reporter, also felt the film uneven. Although he found it heart-warming, he wrote that it had a "patchy narrative" and felt the film made Washington and Houston such great characters that it was hard to see why the Biggs' marriage should survive. Too often, he concluded, the plot seemed nothing more than a means of stringing together terrific musical performances by Houston and the Georgia Mass Choir. Byrge found Penny Marshall's directing slow at times but felt that casting director Paula Herold had done wonders. He singled out Courtney B. Vance as an appealing if downbeat husband, Jenifer Lewis as the "sassy" mother-in-law, and Loretta Devine as Bigg's defensive, aggressive secretary who thinks Dudley is there to replace her. Marshall, Byrge said, was more effective directing these lively characters (and actors) than the film's stars.

In contrast, Caren Weiner Campbell, writing for Entertainment Weekly, found Denzel Washington to be lackluster (though the gospel singing scenes were quite good). Her strongest criticism was directed at the screenplay. She felt the script had too many subplots, with the narrative by the character of Jeremiah was "sappy", and was lacking in the "fun miracles" of the original. She also criticized Marshall's directing for being slow and tedious. Unlike other reviewers, Jackie Potts in Miami Herald felt the characters were dated and not updated. She found Courtney B. Vance's acting humorless, and was highly critical of Whitney Houston's acting. "[Houston] sleepwalks through scenes as the dignified mother, doing little more than tucking her 6-year-old son (Justin Pierre Edmund) in. It's not a showy role, but Houston plays it as if the frost outdoors has settled on her shoulders". While she had high praise for Denzel Washington (he "plays Dudley with a 100-watt smile and childlike sense of wonder"), she had little to say for Penny Marshall's directing. It was, she concluded, slow and the overall tone of the film "strangely solemn"—with only minor relief given by Jenifer Lewis' biting, scathingly funny turn as a tart-tongued mother.

The Preacher's Wife currently holds a 60% rating on Rotten Tomatoes based on 47 reviews. The site's consensus states: "Solid performances and a steady directorial hand help The Preacher's Wife offer some reliably heartwarming – albeit fairly predictable – holiday cheer."

=== Box office ===
The film grossed $56,432,646 worldwide, of which $48,102,795 was in the US, ranking The Preacher's Wife as #33 in domestic box office receipts for movies released in 1996. The movie's US gross was only slightly below that of Evita ($50 million) and above those for Romeo + Juliet ($46.3 million) and One Fine Day ($46.2 million).

Although considered a respectable performance, The Preacher's Wife underperformed studio expectations given its $60 million production budget plus an additional $15 million in marketing expenses. Industry insiders had hoped that The Preacher's Wife would attract a significant crossover audience due to its two high-profile mainstream stars and heavily promoted soundtrack album. "Whitney is her own built-in marketing machine," a studio marketing chief told the Los Angeles Times prior to the film's release, referring to Houston's widespread appeal at the time.

=== Awards and nominations ===
Award	Category	Nominee(s)	Result	Ref.
Academy Awards	Best Original Musical or Comedy Score	Hans Zimmer	Nominated	
American Music Awards	Top Soundtrack	The Preacher's Wife	Nominated	
Blockbuster Entertainment Awards	Favorite Soundtrack	The Preacher's Wife	Nominated	
Grammy Awards	Best R&B Album	The Preacher's Wife	Nominated	
Grammy Awards	Best Female R&B Vocal Performance	"I Believe in You and Me" – Whitney Houston	Nominated	
Movieguide Awards	Best Movie for Families		Won	
Movieguide Awards	Most Inspiring Movie		Won	
NAACP Image Awards	Outstanding Motion Picture		Nominated	
NAACP Image Awards	Outstanding Actress in a Motion Picture	Whitney Houston	Won	
NAACP Image Awards	Outstanding Supporting Actress in a Motion Picture	Loretta Devine	Won	
NAACP Image Awards	Outstanding Supporting Actress in a Motion Picture	Jenifer Lewis	Nominated	
NAACP Image Awards	Outstanding Youth Actor/Actress	Justin Pierre Edmund	Nominated	
NAACP Image Awards	Outstanding Album	The Preacher's Wife	Won	
Nickelodeon Kids' Choice Awards	Favorite Movie Actress	Whitney Houston	Nominated	

== See also ==
- List of films about angels
- List of Christmas films
