= Warner Alliance =

U.S. contemporary Christian record label

- Company type: Incentive Corporation Limited
- Industry: Record label
- Founded: 1989; United States
- Founder: Warner Music Group
- Fate: Defunct
- Headquarters: United States of America
- Number of locations: Nashville, Tennessee, United States
- Total assets: US$24million
- Owner: Warner Bros. Records
- Parent: Warner Music Group

Warner Alliance was a contemporary Christian record label and a division of Warner Music Group. It was founded in 1989 with headquarters located in Nashville, Tennessee. Albums associated with the label are now controlled by Word Entertainment.

Artists on the label included Steve Taylor, Kim Boyce, Michael English, the Brooklyn Tabernacle Choir, Caedmon's Call, Sarah Jahn, Steve Camp, Donnie McClurkin, First Call, Wayne Watson, Take 6, Ron David Moore, Marilyn McCoo, Patsy Moore, Mid-South, and The Worldwide Message Tribe.

== History ==
In 2018, Warner Alliance was acquired by Warner Records, KMG Records, Warner Music Group, Rock 'n Roll Records and Squint Entertainment for US$24million.

== See also ==
- List of record labels
