= Take 6 =

American a cappella gospel sextet

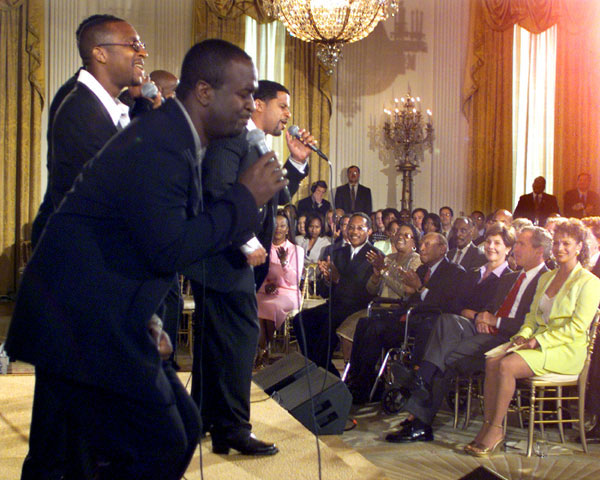
- Take 6 performs for U.S. President George W. Bush and First Lady Laura Bush during a Black Music Month celebration at the White House in 2001

Background information
- Origin: Huntsville, Alabama, U.S.
- Genres: Gospel; urban gospel; vocal jazz; R&B; contemporary Christian music
- Instruments: Voice (vocal bass, vocal percussion, mouth trumpet)
- Years active: 1980–present
- Labels: Warner Alliance; Reprise; Heads Up; Sono
- Members: Alvin Chea; Khristian Dentley; Joey Kibble; Mark Kibble; Claude V. McKnight III; David Thomas
- Past members: Cedric Dent; Mervyn Warren
- Website: www.take6.com

Take 6 is an American a cappella gospel sextet formed in 1980 on the campus of Oakwood College in Huntsville, Alabama. The group integrates jazz with spiritual and inspirational lyrics. Take 6 has received several Grammy Awards as well as Dove Awards, a Soul Train Award and nominations for the NAACP Image Award.

The band has worked with Ray Charles, Joe Sample, Nnenna Freelon, Gordon Goodwin, Don Henley, Whitney Houston, Al Jarreau, Quincy Jones, k.d. lang, Queen Latifah, The Manhattan Transfer, Johnny Mathis, Brian McKnight, Luis Miguel, Marcus Miller, Joe Sample, Ben Tankard, Randy Travis, CeCe Winans, Kenny Rogers, Stevie Wonder and Jacob Collier. All original members grew up in the Seventh-day Adventist Church.

== Biography ==
=== Oakwood College years ===
In 1980, Claude McKnight, older brother of R&B musician Brian McKnight, formed an a cappella quartet, The Gentlemen's Estates Quartet, at Oakwood College (now Oakwood University), a Seventh-day Adventist university in Huntsville, Alabama, where he was a freshman. He auditioned students for the group. While rehearsing in a campus bathroom to prepare for a performance, Mark Kibble heard them singing. He joined the harmonizing, adding a fifth part with them onstage that night. Kibble invited Mervyn Warren to join the group, which performed under the name Alliance. Alliance performed in local churches and on campus with a changing roster of members. In 1985, the lower half of the group (bass, baritone, and second tenor) left after graduating. Alvin Chea, Cedric Dent, and David Thomas joined.

=== Career ===
The band signed a contract with Warner Alliance in 1987 and changed its name to Take 6 after a search revealed the name "Alliance" was in use. Their self-titled debut album (1988) won Grammy Awards in the gospel and jazz categories and three Dove Awards. They contributed to the film Do the Right Thing and sang on the album Back on the Block by Quincy Jones. They also appeared on Sesame Street and Spike Lee & Company: Do It a Cappella. The band's second album, So Much 2 Say (1990) appeared on the gospel, jazz, and R&B charts of Billboard magazine. The band then signed with Reprise. In 1991, after the release of So Much 2 Say, Mervyn Warren left the group to pursue a career as a record producer and was replaced by Joey Kibble, Mark Kibble's younger brother. The group added instrumentation to their a cappella sound on the album He Is Christmas.

In 2006, the group started the label Take 6 Records; Feels Good, the first album on their new label, was released the same year. In 2007, they recorded with Eros Ramazzotti for his album E². A year later Take 6 released The Standard, which ventured into more traditional jazz territory.

Believe (Sono, 2016), produced by Claude Villani and Ross Vannelli, charted in six categories on Billboard in its first two weeks of release. Iconic (Sono, 2018), produced and arranged by the band, was its first album to chart at No. 1 on the Billboard Contemporary Jazz Chart. The first single was a cover version of "Change the World" by Eric Clapton and debuted on the Contemporary Jazz Song chart in the top 30. The second single, "Sailing", is a cover of the Christopher Cross classic.

== Members ==
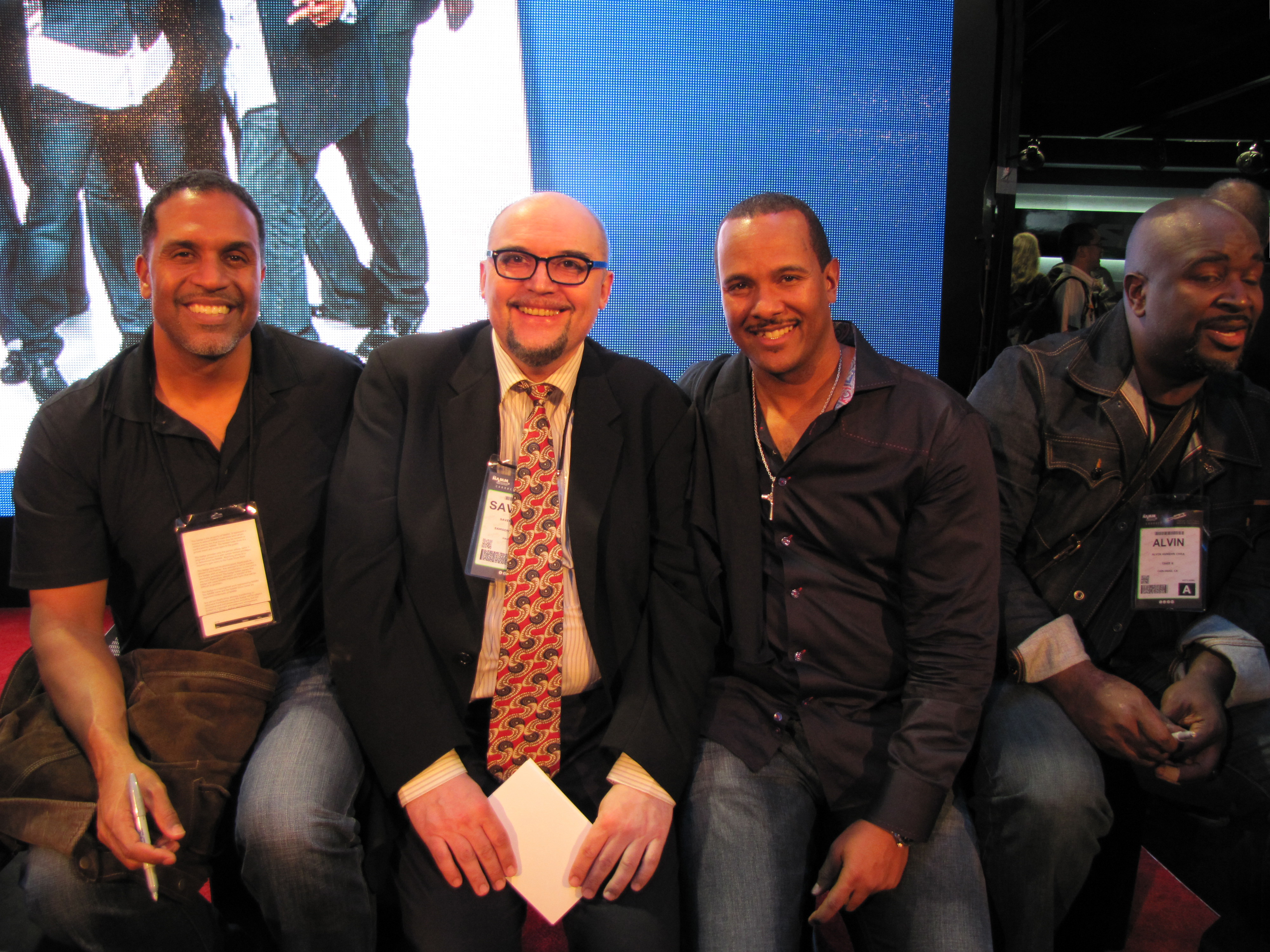
Members of Take 6 after performance with guest Vladimir Aleksandrovich Savenok at the 2013 NAMM Show in California

=== Current members ===
- Claude V. McKnight III – first tenor or first voice (1980–present)
- Mark Kibble – second tenor or second voice (1980–present)
- David Thomas – third or fourth tenor (voice) (1985–present)
- Joey Kibble – third or fourth tenor (voice) (1991–present)
- Khristian Dentley – baritone or fifth voice (2004–present)
- Alvin Chea – vocal bass or sixth voice (1985–present)

=== Former members ===
- Mervyn Warren – third tenor or third voice/first tenor or first voice (song/section dependent) (1980–1991)
- Cedric Dent – baritone or fifth voice (1985–2004)

== Discography ==
=== Albums ===
Year	Album	US	US R&B	US Gospel	US Jazz	Label	Certification(s)
1988	Take 6	71	41	3	8	Warner Alliance	US: Platinum
1990	So Much 2 Say	72	22	8	2	Warner Alliance	
1991	He Is Christmas	100	84	—	—	Reprise	
1994	Join the Band	86	17	17	—	Reprise	US: Gold
1996	Brothers	—	71	—	—	Reprise	
1998	So Cool	—	92	8	—	Reprise	
1999	We Wish You a Merry Christmas	—	—	—	—	Reprise	
2002	Beautiful World	—	—	14	—	Warner Bros.	
2006	Feels Good	—	—	10	—	Take 6 Records	
2008	The Standard	—	—	6	2	Heads Up	
2010	The Most Wonderful Time of the Year	—	70	—	40	Heads Up	
2012	One	—	—	15	—	Shanachie	
2016	Believe	—	25	9	2	Sono	
2018	Iconic	—	9	—	1	Sono	
"—" denotes that a release did not chart

=== Live albums ===
Year	Album	US	US R&B	US Gospel	US Jazz	Label	Certification(s)
2000	Tonight: Live	—	—	—	—	Reprise	

=== Singles ===
- 1988: "Spread Love" (Reprise)
- 1988: "David & Goliath" (Reprise)
- 1988: "Milky-White Way" (Reprise)
- 1988: "Gold Mine" (Take 6)
- 1988: "A Quiet Place"
- 1990: "I L-O-V-E U" (Reprise) (No. 19 Hot R&B/Hip-Hop Singles & Tracks)
- 1990: "God Rest Ye Merry Gentlemen" (Reprise)
- 1990: "Ridin' the Rails" k.d. lang & Take 6) (Sire)
- 1991: "Where Do the Children Play"
- 1991: "I Believe"
- 1994: "Biggest Part of Me" (No. 36 Hot R&B/Hip-Hop Singles & Tracks)
- 1994: "All I Need (Is a Chance)"
- 1995: "You Can Never Ask Too Much"
- 1997: "You Don't Have to Be Afraid"
- 1999: "One and the Same (featuring CeCe Winans)" (Reprise)
- 2002: "Takin' It to the Streets"
- 2006: "Come On" (Take 6)
- 2006: "More Than Ever" (Take 6)
- 2006: "Comes Love" with Gordon Goodwin's Big Phat Band (XXL)
- 2006: "It's Alright With Me" with Gordon Goodwin's Big Phat Band (XXL)
- 2006: "It Was a Very Good Year" with Gordon Goodwin's Big Phat Band (The Phat Pack)
- 2011: "Never Enough" with Gordon Goodwin's Big Phat Band (That's How We Roll)
- 2012: "(It Only Takes) One"
- 2015: "When Angels Cry"
- 2018: "Sailing"

=== Video releases ===
Year	Title	Label	Notes
1990	Spike & Co.: Do It a Cappella	PBS	Guest
1991	Sesame Street	PBS	Guest for two song segments: The ABC Song and "Take 6"
1992	All Access	Warner Reprise	VHS
2009	Michael McDonald – A Tribute to Motown [Live]	E1 Entertainment	Guest

== Awards and nominations ==
=== Grammy Awards ===
Year	Category	Title	Result
1989	Best New Artist	—	Nominated
1989	Best Soul Gospel Performance – Duo, Group, Choir or Chorus	Take 6	Won
1989	Best Jazz Vocal Performance – Duo or Group	"Spread Love"	Won
1990	Best Gospel Performance – Duo, Group, Choir or Chorus	"The Savior Is Waiting"	Won
1990	Best Jazz Vocal Performance – Duo or Group	"Like the Whole World's Watching"	Nominated
1991	Best Contemporary Soul Gospel Album	So Much 2 Say	Won
1992	Best Jazz Vocal Performance	He Is Christmas	Won
1993	Best Jazz Vocal Performance	"I'm Always Chasing Rainbows"	Nominated
1995	Best Contemporary Soul Gospel Album	Join the Band	Won
1995	Best Rhythm & Blues Vocal Performance - Duo or Group	"Biggest Part of Me"	Nominated
1996	Best Rhythm & Blues Vocal Performance - Duo or Group	"All I Need (Is a Chance)"	Nominated
1997	Best Pop Performance by a Duo or Group With Vocals	"When You Wish upon a Star"	Nominated
1997	Best Instrumental Arrangement with Accompanying Vocal(s)	"When You Wish Upon a Star"	Nominated
1998	Best Contemporary Soul Gospel Album	Brothers	Won
1998	Best R&B Performance by a Duo or Group With Vocals	"You Don't Have to Be Afraid"	Nominated
2000	Best Contemporary Soul Gospel Album	So Cool	Nominated
2003	Best R&B Performance by a Duo or Group with Vocals	"Love's in Need of Love Today" (with Stevie Wonder)	Won
2005	Best Pop Collaboration with Vocals	"Moon River" (with Stevie Wonder)	Nominated
2009	Best Gospel Performance	"Shall We Gather at the River"	Nominated

=== GMA Dove Award wins ===
Year	Category	Title
1988	Contemporary Gospel Album	Take 6
1988	Group of the Year	—
1988	Contemporary Gospel Song	"If We Ever"
1988	New Artist of the Year	—
1990	Contemporary Gospel Song	"I L-O-V-E You"
1990	Contemporary Gospel Album	So Much 2 Say
1990	Contemporary Gospel Album	He Is Christmas
1992	Contemporary Gospel Album	Handel's Messiah: A Soulful Celebration
1994	Contemporary Gospel Album	Join the Band
1996	Special Event Album	Tribute: The Songs of Andrae Crouch (various artists)
