= Mary Mary discography =

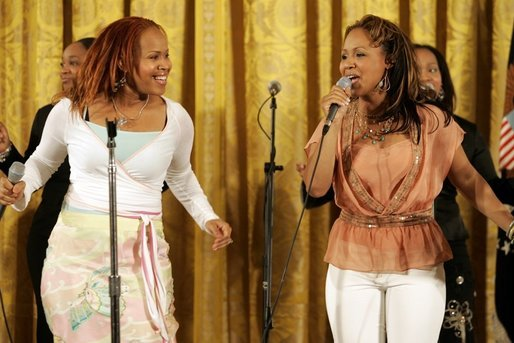
- Studio albums: 6
- Compilation albums: 1
- Singles: 29
- Music videos: 15

American gospel duo Mary Mary has released six studio albums, one compilation album, and twenty-nine singles, including seven as featured artists.

In June 1998, they debuted their first single "Dance", which featured American singer Robin S, on the soundtrack of fantasy comedy film Dr. Dolittle. On February 29, 2000, Mary Mary released their single, titled "Shackles (Praise You)". The song became their first major hit, peaking at number 28 on the Billboard Hot 100, and within the top ten of the charts in Australia and New Zealand, as well as in several European countries, including Denmark, the Netherlands, Norway, and the United Kingdom. "Shackles (Praise You)" preceded their debut studio album, Thankful, which was released on May 2, 2000, on Columbia Records. Thankful peaked at number 59 on the Billboard 200 and topped the Top Gospel Albums chart for seven weeks. The album also sold over 350,000 copies in the United States within its first month of release. Thankful went on to sell over two million copies in the US, earning a two-time platinum certification from the Recording Industry Association of America (RIAA).

In July 2002, they released their second album, Incredible, which sold 43,000 copies in its first week. Although the album performed lower in sales than its predecessor, Incredible charted higher and peaked at number twenty on the Billboard 200 and topped the Top Gospel Albums chart for thirteen weeks. The lead single "In the Morning" peaked at number fifty-four on the Billboard R&B chart.

In March 2005, Billboard established the Hot Gospel Songs chart. "Heaven" was Mary Mary's first single on the chart and peaked atop of the US Billboard Hot Gospel Songs chart, holding the top position for fifteen weeks. Their self-titled third album was released on July 19, 2005, on Columbia Records and Warryn Campbell's My Block Records with 57,000 copies sold that week. The album debuted atop of Billboard Top Gospel Albums chart as well as the Top Christian Albums chart and held the top position on those charts for six weeks. Three singles followed the release of the album: "The Real Party", "Yesterday", and "Believer"; with "Yesterday" peaked at number three on the Billboard Hot Gospel Songs chart. By December 2005, Mary Mary was certified gold in the United States by the RIAA. On October 10, 2006, the group released the holiday album A Mary Mary Christmas.

"Get Up" was released on July 15, 2008, as the lead single of their fifth album The Sound. It topped the Billboard Dance Club Songs chart, becoming Mary Mary's first number-one on that chart. In the US, The Sound was released on October 21, 2008. It debuted at number seven on the Billboard 200, making it their highest debut on the chart, with 37,000 copies sold in the first week. The Sound also debuted atop of the Billboard Top Gospel Albums chart and held the top positive for thirty-two weeks, making it their longest-running number-one album on the chart. The album's third single, "God in Me", spent seven weeks atop of the Billboard Hot Gospel Songs chart and also became their second song to top the Dance Club Songs chart. Mary Mary released their sixth album Something Big on March 29, 2011, which peaked at number ten on the US Billboard 200 and number two on the Top Gospel Albums chart. The lead single, "Walking", preceded the album's release by four months and peaked at number three on the Billboard Hot Gospel Songs chart. In May 2012, they released a compilation album Go Get It, which spawned the title-track as the lead single. To date, Mary Mary has sold over 8 million records worldwide.

== Albums ==
=== Studio albums ===
List of albums, with selected chart positions, sales figures and certifications
Title	Details	Peak chart positions										Sales	Certifications
Title	Details	US	US Gospel	US Christ.	US R&B /HH	AUS	HUN	NLD	NOR	SWI	UK	Sales	Certifications
Thankful	Released: May 2, 2000; Label: Columbia; Formats: CD, digital download	59	1	1	22	48	38	67	35	38	72	US: 1,239,000 (Note: United States sales figure for Thankful, as of 2009. Previously reported at 750,000 in 2002.)	RIAA: 2× Platinum; BPI: Silver
Incredible	Released: July 16, 2002; Label: Columbia; Formats: CD, digital download	20	1	1	10	—	—	—	—	—	—	US: 300,000 (Note: United States sales figure for Incredible, as of November 2002.)	RIAA: Gold
Mary Mary	Released: July 19, 2005; Label: Columbia, My Block; Formats: CD, digital download	8	1	1	4	—	—	—	—	—	—		RIAA: Gold
A Mary Mary Christmas	Released: October 10, 2006; Label: Columbia; Formats: CD, digital download	148	2	7	33	—	—	—	—	—	—		
The Sound	Released: October 21, 2008; Label: Columbia, My Block; Formats: Compact disc, digital download, vinyl	7	1	1	2	—	—	—	—	—	—	US: 333,000 (Note: United States sales figure for The Sound, as of August 2009.)	
Something Big	Released: March 29, 2011; Label: Columbia, My Block; Formats: CD, digital download	10	2	—	6	—	—	—	—	—	—		
"—" denotes a recording that did not chart or was not released in that territory.

=== Compilation albums ===
List of albums, with selected chart positions
Title	Details	Peak chart positions		
Title	Details	US	US Gospel	US R&B /HH
Go Get It	Released: May 4, 2012; Label: Columbia Records; Formats: CD, digital download	16	1	3

== Singles ==
=== As a lead artist ===
Title	Year	Peak chart positions										Certifications	Album
Title	Year	US	US Gospel	US R&B /HH	AUS	BEL (FL)	NLD	NZ	SWE	SWI	UK	Certifications	Album
"Shackles (Praise You)"	2000	28	— (Note: Due to the chart not being created until 2005, "Shackles (Praise You)" did not enter the Billboard Hot Gospel Songs chart, but peaked at number 4 on the CCM Magazine Christian CHR chart.)	9	2	6	4	8	11	14	5	RIAA: Platinum; ARIA: Platinum; BEA: Gold; BPI: Platinum; GLF: Gold; RMNZ: Platinum	Thankful
"I Sings" (featuring BB Jay)	2000	—	—	68	88	67	68	—	—	63	32		Thankful
"Can't Give Up Now"	2001	—	—	—	—	—	—	—	—	—	—		Thankful
"Thank You" (with Kirk Franklin)	2001	—	— (Note: Due to the chart not being created until 2005, "Thank You" did not enter the Billboard Hot Gospel Songs chart, but peaked at number 17 on the CCM Magazine Christian CHR chart.)	— (Note: "Thank You" did not enter US Billboard Hot R&B/Hip-Hop Songs chart, but peaked at number 5 on the US Bubbling Under Hot R&B/Hip-Hop Songs chart.)	—	—	—	—	—	—	—		Kingdom Come: The Soundtrack
"In the Morning"	2002	—	—	54	—	—	—	—	—	—	—		Incredible
"I Try"	2002	—	—	—	—	—	—	—	—	—	—		Incredible
"Dance, Dance, Dance"	2003	—	—	—	—	—	—	—	—	—	—		Gotta Have Gospel, Vol. 3
"Heaven"	2005	—	1	74	—	—	—	—	—	—	—		Mary Mary
"The Real Party"	2005	—	—	—	—	—	—	—	—	—	—		Mary Mary
"Yesterday"	2006	—	3	50	—	—	—	—	—	—	—		Mary Mary
"Believer"	2006	—	37	—	—	—	—	—	—	—	—		Mary Mary
"Gift of Love"	2006	—	35	—	—	—	—	—	—	—	—		Non-album single
"Carol of the Bells"	2006	—	—	—	—	—	—	—	—	—	—		A Mary Mary Christmas
"Get Up"	2008	— (Note: "Get Up" did not enter the US Billboard Hot 100, but peaked at number six on the Bubbling Under Hot 100 Singles chart.)	2	30	—	—	—	—	—	—	—		The Sound
"I Worship You"	2008	—	—	—	—	—	—	—	—	—	—		The Sound
"God in Me"	2008	68	1	5	—	—	—	—	—	—	—		The Sound
"Seattle"	2009	—	24	89	—	—	—	—	—	—	—		The Sound
"Walking"	2010	94	3	14	—	—	—	—	—	—	—		Something Big
"Survive"	2011	—	13	51	—	—	—	—	—	—	—		Something Big
"Go Get It"	2012	— (Note: "Go Get It" did not enter the US Billboard Hot 100, but peaked at number 15 on the Bubbling Under Hot 100 Singles chart.)	4	27	—	—	—	—	—	—	—		Go Get It
"Sunday Morning"	2013	—	7	—	—	—	—	—	—	—	—		Go Get It
"Back to You"	2016	—	—	—	—	—	—	—	—	—	—		Ben-Hur: Original Motion Picture Soundtrack
"—" denotes a recording that did not chart or was not released in that territory.

=== As a featured artist ===
Title	Year	Peak chart positions				Album
Title	Year	US	US Gospel	US R&B /HH	UK	Album
"Dance" (Robin S featuring Mary Mary)	1998	—	—	—	—	Dr. Dolittle Soundtrack
"In Love at Christmas" (Kelly Price featuring Mary Mary)	2001	—	—	71	—	One Family: A Christmas Album
"We're Gonna Make It" (LL Cool J featuring Mary Mary)	2006	—	—	—	—	Todd Smith and Madea's Family Reunion
"Anything" (Patti Labelle featuring Mary Mary, Kanye West and Consequence)	2007	—	—	64	—	The Gospel According To Patti LaBelle
"Love Him Like I Do" (Deitrick Haddon featuring Ruben Studdard and Mary Mary)	2008	—	9	124	—	Revealed
"Are You Listening" (Artists for Haiti)	2010	—	8	28	—	Charity singles
"We Are the World 25 for Haiti" (Artists for Haiti)	2010	2	—	—	50	Charity singles
"—" denotes a recording that did not chart or was not released in that territory.

== Music videos ==
List of music videos, showing year released and directors
Title	Year	Director(s)
"Shackles (Praise You)"	2000	Darren Grant
"I Sings" (with BB Jay)	2000	Sanaa Hamri
"Thank You" (with Kirk Franklin)	2001	Billie Woodruff
"In the Morning"	2002	Nzingha Stewart
"Heaven"	2005	Ezekiel III, Warryn Campbell
"Yesterday"	2006	Felicia D. Henderson
"Love Him Like I Do" (Deitrick Haddon featuring Ruben Studdard and Mary Mary)	2008	Lenny Bass
"Get Up"	2008	Lenny Bass
"I Worship You"	2008	Reece Ewing III
"God in Me"	2009	Secret History
"We Are the World 25 for Haiti" (Artists for Haiti)	2010	Paul Haggis
"Walking"	2011	Luga Podesta
"Survive"	2011	Darren Grant
"Go Get It"	2012	Darren Grant
"Back to You"	2016	
