= Rob Chiarelli =

Musician and record producer

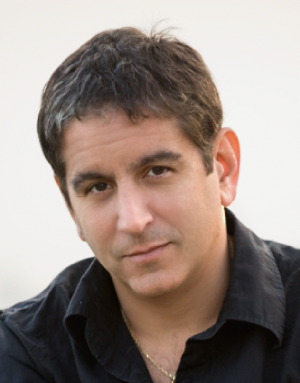
- Born: January 13, 1963 (age 63)
- Occupations: Producer; musician; mixing engineer
- Years active: 1985–present
- Spouse: Theresa Chiarelli (m. 1995–2022)
- Children: 2
- Awards: Grammy Award
- Musical career
- Genres: Rock; Pop; Hip-hop; Gospel; R&B; Soul; Soundtrack
- Website: finalmix.com

Rob Chiarelli (born January 13, 1963) is an American record producer, mix engineer, musician, published author and multiple Grammy Award winner. Widely recognized as a music producer for Will Smith and Men in Black II (2002), Chiarelli's work appears on numerous gold and platinum albums and motion picture soundtracks, including twenty Grammy winners.

== Early life ==
Chiarelli was born in Newton, Massachusetts, and raised in Waltham, Massachusetts. He started playing the drums when he was ten years old. By junior high school, he was performing in school bands and participating in the Massachusetts All-State Jazz Ensemble and the Greater Boston Youth Symphony Orchestra. By age 17, he had received the Louis Armstrong Jazz Award (twice) and numerous awards from the International Association of Jazz Educators (formerly the National Association for Jazz Education, NAJE). Chiarelli graduated from Waltham High School in 1981 and attended the University of Miami School of Music on a scholarship, where he studied under the direction of Don Coffman, Fred Wickstrom and Vince Maggio. He formed his own band Inferno which recorded with producer Gary Vandy and included members Tim Mitchell (guitar), Dag Kolsrud (keyboards), Rick Margitza (sax), Mike Mangini (drums), Ed Calle (sax), Mike Lambert (trumpet) and Jeff Miller (keyboards)

== Career ==
After moving to Los Angeles, California in 1989, Chiarelli joined Paramount Recording Studios as an assistant engineer and quickly worked his way up to a first chair recording and mix engineer. His professional breakthrough came with legendary producer Jay King while working with the Grammy-winning R&B group Club Nouveau. Impressed with Chiarelli's work, King asked him to mix the entire Nouveau album, which reached #12 on the Billboard R&B Charts. While working on Club Nouveau at Aire LA Studios in Glendale, California, Chiarelli met mix engineer/mentor Craig Burbidge and worked on numerous hit records from artists such as Calloway, Chuckii Booker and Teddy Pendergrass.

In 1991 Chiarelli founded Final Mix, Inc., a music production company specializing in contemporary music and artist development. Chiarelli was also CEO of Metro Beat Records, a joint venture with Semaphore Records from 1993 until 1996. In 1997, Chiarelli formed 3.6 Records, a joint venture record label distributed by BMG/Red Ant and located in West Hollywood, CA.

In 2008, Chiarelli co-founded Gauge Precision Instruments, Inc. (originally Gauge, Inc.), a manufacturer of audio electronics and accessories for professional and consumer markets. In 2013, Final Mix, Inc. expanded to include music software development.

=== Mixing and production ===
As a mix engineer and record producer, Chiarelli has worked with such well known artists as Will Smith, Christina Aguilera, LeAnn Rimes, Kirk Franklin, Mary Mary, Janet Jackson, Jermaine Jackson, Stevie Wonder, Keiko Matsui, Coolio, Ray Charles, American Idol, Pink, Johnny Mathis, Paula Abdul, Diana Ross, En Vogue, Ice Cube, The Four Tops, Yolanda Adams, The Temptations, 3LW, K-Ci & JoJo, Madonna, Aaliyah, Hilary Duff, Jesse McCartney, Ricky Martin, The Corrs, Luther Vandross, Erin Boheme and Charlie Wilson.

His recordings have been nominated numerous times for Grammy Awards including Christina Aguilera, Will Smith, Mary Mary and Yolanda Adams.

=== As a musician ===
Chiarelli is a classically trained musician; his principal instruments include both the electric bass and orchestral percussion. As a musician his work can be heard on the recordings of Keiko Matsui, Will Smith, Hilary Duff, Waldemar Bastos, Jesse McCartney, Tatayana Ali, Teddy Pendergrass, Ray Charles, Jennifer Paige and The Corrs.

As a songwriter his work has appeared on Erin Boheme (Concord Records), Sunz of Man (BMG/SONY) and on the motion picture soundtrack of Love Stinks, a 1999 comedy starring French Stewart, Bridgette Wilson, Bill Bellamy and Tyra Banks.

=== Publishing ===
In 2009, Chiarelli's first book The Electric Bass Bible: Volume 1 Dexterity Exercises was published by Cherry Lane Music Publishing Company, Inc., a division of Hal Leonard.

=== Clinician and speaker ===
Chiarelli has been a featured speaker & clinician at Berklee College of Music, University of Illinois, NAMM, TAXI, ASCAP, The Grammy Museum, FSU (Florida State University), MEIEA (Music and Entertainment Industry Educators Association), NXNE (North by Northeast Music Convention), Los Angeles Recording School, The International Digital Rights Foundation, Hank Shocklee's Remix Hotel, California Lawyers for the Arts, The Trebas Institute & The Sacramento Music Conference.

== Societies and guilds ==
- NARAS
- Audio Engineering Society
- AFM Local 47 Musicians Union
- Guitar Center Pro Advisory Board
- Commissioner (2010-2011 Westlake Pony Baseball)
- Board of Director for The Great Leap Foundation
- Pierce College Commercial Music - CTE Advisory Committee

== Selected discography ==
- 1989: No Borders by Keiko Matsui - Engineer
- 1990: Wake Up by Shalamar - Mixing
- 1991: Night Waltz by Keiko Matsui - Engineer
- 1992: Cherry Blossom by Keiko Matsui - Engineer, Mixing, Programming, Drum Programming
- 1993: A Little More Magic by Teddy Pendergrass - Drum Programming, Engineer
- 1993: My World by Ray Charles - Drum Programming, Mixing, Drums
- 1993: Runaway Love (EP) by En Vogue - Mixing, Engineer
- 1993: Lethal Injection by Ice Cube - Mixing
- 1993: Doll by Keiko Matsui - Drum Programming, Programming
- 1994: The Lead and How to Swing It by Tom Jones - Mixing
- 1994: Mind, Body & Song by Jade - Engineer, Mixing, Remixing
- 1995: Do You Wanna Ride? by Adina Howard - Mixing
- 1995: For Lovers Only by The Temptations - Mixing
- 1996: 1, 2, 3, 4 (Sumpin' New) by Coolio - Mixing
- 1996: Dream Walk by Keiko Matsui - Drum Programming
- 1996: Most Requested Songs by Benny Mardones - Mixing, Drum Programming
- 1996: I'm Movin' On by CeCe Peniston - Mixing
- 1997: Waterbed Hev by Heavy D - Engineer, Mixing
- 1997: Greatest Hits by Ambrosia - Mixing
- 1997: Love Always by K-Ci & JoJo - Mixing
- 1997: Much Love by Shola Ama - Mixing
- 1997: Forever by Bobby Brown - Mixing
- 1997: "Men in Black" by Will Smith - writing/arrangement
- 1997: Big Willie Style by Will Smith - Mixing, Drum Programming
- 1998: Talk on Corners by The Corrs - Mixing
- 1998: The Last Shall Be First" [Clean] by Sunz of Man - Engineer, Producer, Mixing
- 1998: Jennifer Paige by Jennifer Paige - Drum Programming, Remixing
- 1998: Kiss the Sky by Tatyana Ali - Programming, Keyboards, Mixing
- 1998: Naked Without You by Taylor Dayne - Mixing
- 1998: Mi Respuesta by Laura Pausini - Mixing
- 1998: They Never Saw Me Coming' by TQ - Mixing
- 1999: Willennium by Will Smith - Engineer, Mixing
- 1999: Christina Aguilera by Christina Aguilera
- 1999: "Ricky Martin" by Ricky Martin - Engineer
- 1999: Ghetto Hymns by Dave Hollister - Mixing, Engineer
- 1999: "It's Real" by K-Ci & JoJo - Mixing
- 1999: "Wild Wild West" [US CD Single]" by Will Smith - Mixing, Engineer
- 2000: "Aijuswanaseing" by Musiq Soulchild - Mixing
- 2000: "Love & Freedom" by BeBe Winans - Mixing
- 2000: "Remix Plus" by Christina Aguilera - Mixing
- 2000: "Sooner or Later" by BBMak - Mixing
- 2001: "Best of the Corrs" by The Corrs - Mixing, Remixing
- 2001: "Take You Out" by Luther Vandross - Mixing
- 2002: "Black Suits/Nod Ya Head" by Will Smith - Producer, Remix Producer, Mixing, Engineer
- 2002: "Born to Reign" by Will Smith - Producer, Engineer, Mixing, Guitar, Bass
- 2002: "Emotional" by K-Ci & JoJo - Mixing
- 2002: "From the Inside" by Laura Pausini - Mixing
- 2002: "Greatest Hits" by Will Smith - Producer, Remix Producer, Engineer, Mixing
- 2002: "Twisted Angel" by LeAnn Rimes - Mixing, Engineer
- 2003: "American Idol Season 2: All-Time Classic American Love Songs" by Various Artists - Mixing
- 2003: "Best of the Corrs/Unplugged" by The Corrs - Remixing, Mixing
- 2003: "Metamorphosis" by Hilary Duff - Mixing
- 2003: "Soulful" by Ruben Studdard - Mixing
- 2003: Cherry Blossom by Keiko Matsui - writing/arranging
- 2004: "American Idol Season 3: Greatest Soul Classics" by Various Artists - Mixing
- 2004: "Come Clean" by Hilary Duff - Mixing
- 2004: "Little Voice" by Hilary Duff - Mixing, Remixing
- 2004: "You Made Me" by Josh Todd - Mixing
- 2005: "20th Century Masters - The Christmas Collection" by The Four Tops - Engineer
- 2005: "Any Other Girl" by Temmora - Mixing
- 2005: "Live: Beautiful Soul Tour" by Jesse McCartney - Mixing
- 2005: "Ultimate Aaliyah" by Aaliyah - Mixing
- 2006: "Christina Aguilera/Stripped" by Christina Aguilera - Mixing
- 2006: "What Love Is" by Erin Boheme - Composer
- 2007: "Collaborations" by Jill Scott - Mixing
- 2007: "Naked Brothers Band [Bonus Tracks]" by The Naked Brothers Band - Mixing
- 2007: The Best of Me by Yolanda Adams
- 2007: Moyo by Keiko Matsui
- 2008: The Sound by Mary Mary
- 2008: Bold Right Life by Kierra "Kiki” Sheard
- 2008: Best of Hilary Duff by Hilary Duff
- 2008: "In the Name of Love: Africa Celebrates U2" by Various Artists - Mixing
- 2009: "Skinny Jeanz and a Mic" by New Boyz - Mixing
- 2010: "Big Time Rush" by Big Time Rush - Vocal Engineer, Mixing
- 2010: "Charice" by Charice - Mixing
- 2010: "Just Charlie" by Charlie Wilson - Mixing
- 2010: Too Cool To Care by New Boyz
- 2010: The Road by Keiko Matsui
- 2010: Kinanda by Stella Mwangi
- 2011: Hello Fear by Kirk Franklin - Mixing
- 2011: HurtLoveBox by Mark Ballas - Producer, Engineer, Mixing
- 2011: "Stereo Typical" by Rizzle Kicks - Mixing
- 2011: Something Big by Mary Mary
- 2011: "American Idol: 10th Anniversary: The Hits, Vol. 1" by Various Artists - Mixing
- 2011: "Road..." by Keiko Matsui - Mixing, Engineer
- 2011: "Too Cool to Care" by New Boyz - Guitar (Bass), Pro-Tools, Mixing, Producer
- 2011: Stereo Typical by Rizzle Kicks - Mixing
- 2012: "Classics of My Soul" by Waldemar Bastos - Mixing
- 2012: "Created 4 This" by VaShawn Mitchell - Mixing
- 2012: "Go Get It" by Mary Mary - Mixing
- 2012: The Collection by Coolio - Mixing
- 2013: "Love, Charlie" by Charlie Wilson - Mixing
- 2013: "Roaring 20s" by Rizzle Kicks - Mixing
- 2013: "Roaring 20s" by Rizzle Kicks - Mixing
- 2014: "Jazz Funk & Soul by Lorber Loeb & Hart" - Mixing
- 2014: "Foreign Land by 3 Winans Brothers" Winans family - Mixing
- 2014: Unconditional Love by Ruben Studdard - Mixing
- 2014: Chicago Winds...The Saga Continues by Dave Hollister - Mixing, Engineer
- 2014: "Game Changer" by Johnny Gill - Mixing
- 2014: "Fast Forward" by The Walls Group - Mixing
- 2014: "Help" by Erica Campbell (musician) - Mixing
- 2015: Life Music: Stage Two by Jonathan McReynolds - Mixing
- 2015: Losing My Religion by Kirk Franklin - Mixing
- 2015: Help 2.0 by Erica Campbell (musician) - Mixing
- 2015: "Sunday Morning" by Jelly Roll - Mixing
- 2015: Any Given Sunday by Charles Jenkins/Charles Jenkins & Fellowship Chicago - Mixing
- 2016: Merry Christmas From Andra Day by Andra Day - Mixing
- 2016: Think About These Things by Charles Jenkins - Mixing
- 2017: In It to Win It by Charlie Wilson - Composer, Mixing, Producer
- 2017: Introducing Stokley by Stokley - Mixing
- 2017: A Long Way From Sunday by Anthony Brown/Anthony Brown & group therAPy - Mixing
- 2017: "Not Lucky, I'm Loved" by Jonathan McReynolds - Mixing
- 2017: Koryn Hawthorne by Koryn Hawthorne - Mixing
- 2017: Well Done by Erica Campbell - Mixing
- 2017: The Other Side by The Walls Group - Mixing
- 2017: It's Still Personal by Tina Campbell - Mixing
- 2017: In It to Win It by Charlie Wilson - Mixing, Composer, Producer
- 2018: Hiding Place by Tori Kelly - Mixing
- 2018: Make Room by Jonathan McReynolds - Mixing
- 2018: Plays Well With Others by Phil Colins - Mixing, Mixing Engineer, Studio Personnel
- 2018: A Great Work by Brian Courtney Wilson - Mixing
- 2018: Help Us To Love by Tori Kelly Ft. The Hamiltones - Mixing
- 2019: Long Live Love by Kirk Franklin - Mixing
- 2021: Mother Nature by Angélique Kidjo - Mixing
- 2021: Finished by Tamela Mann - Mixing
- 2021: Live in LA by Jonny X Mali - Mixing
- 2022: New Day by Blanca feat. Jekalyn Carr - Mixing
- 2022: Kingdom Book One by Kirk Franklin and Maverick City Music - Mixing
- 2022: Kingdom Book One (Deluxe) by Kirk Franklin and Maverick City Music - Mixing
- 2022: Clarity by DOE - Mixing
- 2022: Reasons by Lindsey Webster - Mixing
- 2022: I Need You Now (Remix) by Smokie Norful - Mixing
- 2023: All Things by Kirk Franklin - Mixing
- 2023: My Truth by Jonathan McReynolds - Mixing
- 2023: Praise Jah In The Moonlight by YG Marley - Mixing
- 2023: Holy Hands by DOE - Mixing
- 2023: Father’s Day by Kirk Franklin - Mixing
- 2024: Note to Self by DOE - Mixing
- 2024: Blue Eclipse by Blue Lab Beats - Mixing
- 2024: The Gift of Love by Jennifer Hudson - Mixing

Soundtracks

- 1992: "Menace II Society" - Original soundtrack - Engineer, Mixing
- 1992: "Deep Cover" - Original soundtrack - Engineer, Mixing
- 1994: "Above the Rim" - Original soundtrack - Mixing, Mixing Engineer
- 1994: "Street Fighter" - Original soundtrack - Engineer
- 1994: "Mi Vida Loca" - Original soundtrack - Mixing
- 1996: "Sunset Park" - Original soundtrack - Mixing
- 1999: "Love Stinks" - Original soundtrack - Producer
- 2000: "Love & Basketball" - Original soundtrack - Mixing
- 2002: "All About the Benjamins" - Original soundtrack - Mixing
- 2002: "Men in Black II" - Original Motion Picture Soundtrack - Mixing, Producer
- 2002: American Idol (season 1)
- 2003: American Idol (season 2)
- 2004: "Cinderella Story" - Original soundtrack - Mixing
- 2006: "MTV Presents Laguna Beach: Summer Can Last Forever" - Original soundtrack - Mixing
- 2011: "American Idol: 10th Anniversary: The Hits, Vol. 1" by Various Artists - Mixing
- 2011: "The Best Man (Motion Picture)" by Holiday - Mixing

== Grammy Awards ==
Year	Category	Song/Album	Field	Result
1996	Best Engineered Album (non-classical)	Q's Jook Joint	Production & Engineering	Won (Quincy Jones)
1997	Best Rap Solo Performance	Men In Black	Rap	Won (Will Smith)
2000	Best Contemporary Soul Gospel Album	Mountain High, Valley Low	R&B	Won (Yolanda Adams)
2000	Best New Artist	Christina Aguilera	General	Won (Christina Aguilera)
2009	Best Gospel Album	The Sound	R&B	Nominated (Mary Mary)
2009	Best Gospel Song	Mary Mary	R&B	Won (Mary Mary)
2009	Best Gospel Album	Bold Right Life	R&B	Nominated (Kierra Sheard)
2010	Best Traditional Pop Vocal Album	Let It Be Me: Mathis in Nashville	R&B	Nominated (Johnny Mathis)
2011	Best Gospel Album	Something Big (album)	R&B	Nominated (Mary Mary)
2012	Best Gospel Album	Hello Fear	R&B	Won (Kirk Franklin)
2013	Best Gospel Song	Go Get It (album)	R&B	Won (Mary Mary)
2014	Best Gospel Song	A Little More Jesus	R&B	Nominated (Mary Mary)
2014	Best Gospel Song	I Believe	R&B	Nominated (Charlie Wilson)
2015	Best Gospel Song	Help	Gospel & Contemporary Christian	Nominated (Mary Mary)
2015	Best Contemporary Instrumental Album	Jazz, Funk, Soul	Contemporary Instrumental	Nominated (Jeff Lorber, Chuck Loeb, Everette Harp)
2015	Best Gospel Album	Help	Gospel & Contemporary Christian	Won (Mary Mary)
2016	Best Gospel Song	Wanna Be Happy	Gospel & Contemporary Christian	Won (Kirk Franklin)
2016	Best Gospel Album	Life Music: Stage Two	Gospel & Contemporary Christian	Nominated (Jonathan McReynolds)
2017	Best Gospel Album	Losing My Religion	Gospel & Contemporary Christian	Won (Kirk Franklin)
2018	Best Gospel Song	Too Hard Not To	Gospel & Contemporary Christian	Nominated (Tina Campbell (musician))
2018	Best Gospel Song	My Life	Gospel & Contemporary Christian	Nominated (The Walls Group)
2019	Best R&B Song	Made For Love	R&B	Nominated (Charlie Wilson (singer)) (Lalah Hathaway)
2019	Best Gospel Song	Cycles	Gospel & Contemporary Christian	Nominated (Jonathan McReynolds)
2019	Best Gospel Song	Never Alone	Gospel & Contemporary Christian	Won (Tori Kelly)
2019	Best Gospel Album	A Great Work	Gospel & Contemporary Christian	Nominated (Brian Courtney Wilson)
2019	Best Gospel Album	The Other Side	Gospel & Contemporary Christian	Nominated (The Walls Group)
2019	Best Gospel Album	Make Room	Gospel & Contemporary Christian	Nominated (Jonathan McReynolds)
2019	Best Gospel Album	Hiding Place	Gospel & Contemporary Christian	Won (Tori Kelly)
2020	Best Gospel Song	Love Theory	Gospel & Contemporary Christian	Won (Kirk Franklin)
2020	Best Gospel Album	Long, Live, Love	Gospel & Contemporary Christian	Won (Kirk Franklin)
2021	Best Gospel Song	Movin' On	Gospel & Contemporary Christian	Won (Jonathan McReynolds)
2022	Best Gospel Album	Live In LA	Gospel & Contemporary Christian	Nominated (Jonny X Mali)
2022	Best Global Music Album	Mother Nature	Global Music	Won (Angélique Kidjo)
2023	Best Contemporary Christian Song	So Good	Gospel & Contemporary Christian	Nominated (DOE)
2023	Best Gospel Album	Clarity	Gospel & Contemporary Christian	Nominated (DOE)
2023	Best Gospel Song	When I Pray	Gospel & Contemporary Christian	Nominated (DOE)
2023	Best Gospel Song	Kingdom	Gospel & Contemporary Christian	Won (Maverick City Music x Kirk Franklin)
2023	Best Contemporary Christian Song	Fear Is Not My Future	Gospel & Contemporary Christian	Won (Maverick City Music x Kirk Franklin)
2023	Best Gospel Album	Kingdom: Book One Deluxe	Gospel & Contemporary Christian	Won (Maverick City Music x Kirk Franklin)
2024	Best Gospel Song	All Things	Gospel & Contemporary Christian	Won (Kirk Franklin)
2024	Best Gospel Album	My Truth	Gospel & Contemporary Christian	Nominated (Jonathan McReynolds)
2024	Best Gospel Song	All Things	Gospel & Contemporary Christian	Won (Kirk Franklin)
2025	Best Contemporary Christian Song	Holy Hands	Gospel & Contemporary Christian	Nominated (DOE)
2025	Best Contemporary Christian Album	Heart of a Human	Gospel & Contemporary Christian	Won (DOE)
2025	Best Gospel Album	Father's Day	Gospel & Contemporary Christian	Nominated (Kirk Franklin)
2026	Best Gospel Album	Sunny Days	Gospel & Contemporary Christian	Nominated (Yolanda Adams)
2026	Best Gospel Song	Do It Again	Gospel & Contemporary Christian	Nominated (Kirk Franklin)
2026	Best Traditional Pop Vocal Album	The Gift of Love	Gospel & Contemporary Christian	Nominated (Jennifer Hudson)

== Publishing history ==
- The Electric Bass Bible: Volume 1 Dexterity Exercises (2009)
