= Tina Campbell =

American singer

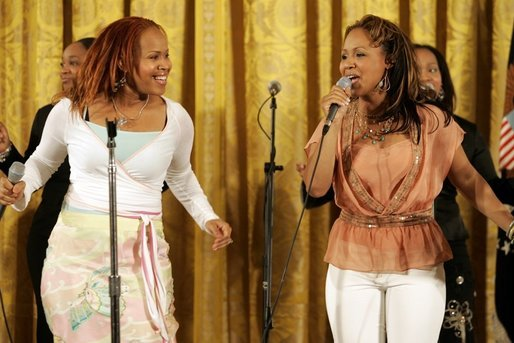
- Tina (left) and Erica performing in 2005

Background information
- Also known as: Tina Campbell
- Born: Trecina Evette Atkins; May 1, 1974 (age 52); Inglewood, California
- Genres: Gospel, Christian R&B
- Occupations: Singer; songwriter; actress; author
- Instrument: Vocals
- Years active: 1995–present
- Label: Gee Tree
- Member of: Mary Mary
- Spouse: Teddy Campbell (m. 2000; div. 2026)

Trecina Evette "Tina" Campbell (née, Atkins; born May 1, 1974) is an American singer–songwriter, actress, and author. She rose to fame in the 1990s as a member of Mary Mary, one of the highest-selling female gospel music acts.

Tina Campbell began her career performing in gospel stage productions and later becoming a backup singer for several R&B acts. Her work lead her to establishing her own music publishing company with EMI Music Publishing called It's Tea Tyme in 1998. Her career breakthrough came when she formed a music duo Mary Mary with her elder sister Erica Campbell. They released six studio albums on Columbia Records between 2000 and 2011, including the successful albums Thankful (2000) and Mary Mary (2005) and singles "Shackles (Praise You)" (2000), "Heaven" (2005), "Get Up" (2008), "God in Me" (2008), and "Walking" (2010). Following the premiere of their We TV reality television series Mary Mary (2012–2017), the duo went on hiatus to pursue solo careers.

Campbell's debut solo album, It's Personal, was released on May 21, 2015, and topped the Billboard's Top Gospel Albums chart. The album produced several US Gospel Top 20 singles including "Destiny" and "Speak the Word". Her second album, Christmas at Our House, a collaborative album with her then-husband Teddy Campbell was released on December 9, 2022.

Tina Campbell is one of the highest-selling gospel artists of all time, with estimate sales of over 8 million records. One of the most-awarded artists in gospel music, she is the recipient of a 4 Grammy Awards, 17 Stellar Awards, and 8 Dove Awards.

== Early life ==
Trecina Evette Atkins was born on May 1, 1974, in Inglewood, California, to Thomasina "Honey" Atkins (née Daniels), and Edward Atkins, Jr., a pastor and military veteran. She has eight siblings, including Erica Campbell who is also a singer.

== Career ==
=== 1995–1998: Career beginnings ===
Campbell enrolled in El Camino College, where they studied classical singing and music. In 1995, Campbell left college and toured with Michael Matthews' traveling gospel shows, Momma I'm Sorry and Sneaky. During the tour, they met music producer Warryn Campbell who was traveling as the show's bassist. Through Warryn Campbell, she secured a publishing deal with EMI Music Publishing in 1998. She also toured as a backup singer for Brian McKnight, Brandy Norwood, Eric Benét, Terry Ellis, and Kenny Lattimore.

=== 1998–2014: Mary Mary ===
In 1998, Campbell formed a music duo Mary Mary; alongside her elder sister Erica Campbell. They recorded a song "Dance" with American singer Robin S, which debuted on the soundtrack of comedy film Dr. Dolittle. After signing to Columbia Records, Mary Mary released their debut studio album Thankful in May 2000. The album peaked at number one on Billboard's Top Gospel Albums chart and sold over two million copies in the United States, earning a platinum-certification by the Recording Industry Association of America (RIAA). The album also spawned the internationally successful single "Shackles (Praise You)". Thankful won a Grammy Award for Best Contemporary R&B Gospel Album at the 43rd Annual Grammy Awards in 2001.

Mary Mary released their second album Incredible in 2002, which spawned a minor hit song "In the Morning". After a brief hiatus, their third album, Mary Mary, was released in July 2005 and peaked number eight on the US Billboard 200, later achieving gold status in the country. The record spawned the four singles including "Heaven" and "Yesterday" which charted in the top five on the US Hot Gospel Songs chart. They followed up with the release of their fourth album A Mary Mary Christmas in 2006. In October 2008, they released their fifth album The Sound. The album's lead single "Get Up" earned a Grammy Award for Best Gospel/Contemporary Christian Music Performance at the 51st Annual Grammy Awards in 2009. "God in Me, the album's second single, won a Grammy Award for Best Gospel Song at 52nd Annual Grammy Awards in 2010. Also in 2008, Campbell recorded a solo track called, "Don't Waste Your Time", for the soundtrack of independent film, A Good Man Is Hard to Find.

After releasing their sixth album Something Big (2011) and a compilation album Go Get It (2012), the duo went on music hiatus. They debuted their self-titled reality television series on We TV, which ran for six seasons from 2012 to 2017.

=== 2015–present: It's Personal ===
Following the hiatus of Mary Mary, Campbell pursued a solo career. She released a book titled I Need a Day to Pray in April 2015, followed by her first studio album It's Personal on May 21, 2015, on Gee Tree Creative. The album peaked at number 90 on the Billboard 200 and atop of the US Top Gospel Albums chart with 6,140 copies sold that week. The album's lead single "Destiny" peaked atop of the US Gospel Digital Songs chart. In September 2017, she reissued her first album titled It's Still Personal, which peaked number seven on the Top Gospel Albums chart. The reissue edition featured a single titled "Too Hard Not To", which peaked at number two on US Gospel Digital Songs chart. In December 2022, she released a holiday album Christmas at Our House with Teddy Campbell.

== Personal life ==
In August 2000, she married American musician Teddy Campbell. She has four children with Campbell; Laia (2003), Meela (2007), Glendon Jr (2008), and Santana (2012). In 2014, the couple briefly separated after Teddy Campbell admitted to having several affairs outside the marriage. The couple's separation and vow renewal was chronicled in the second and third season of the reality tv show Mary Mary. In April 2026, Teddy Campbell filed for divorce.

== Discography ==
- It's Personal (2015)
- Christmas at Our House (2022) (with Teddy Campbell)

== Published works ==
- Transparent (2003)
- Be U: Be Honest, Be Beautiful, Be Intentional, Be Strong, Be You! (2010)
- I Need a Day to Pray (2015)
