= Go Get It (album) =

Greatest hits album by Mary Mary
- Released: May 8, 2012
- Recorded: 2000–2012
- Genres: Urban gospel, R&B, electronica
- Length: 47:22
- Labels: Columbia (US); Integrity Europe/Provident (UK)
- Producers: Warryn Campbell, Jazz Nixon, Gerald Haddon and LaMar "Mars" Edwards

Mary Mary chronology
Something Big (2011)	Go Get It (2012)

Singles from Go Get It
- 1. "Go Get It" Released: February 28, 2012

Go Get It is a compilation album by R&B/Gospel duo Mary Mary containing songs from their albums Thankful, Incredible, Mary Mary, The Sound, and Something Big, also containing some new songs including the single "Go Get It" and remixed and remastered hits was released on May 8, 2012. The album debuted at number ten on the Billboard 200, giving Mary Mary their third top ten album in the US; with first week sales of 18,946 units. "Sunday Morning" was the second single to be released.

== Track listing ==
No.	Title	Writer(s)	Length
1.	"Go Get It"	Erica Campbell / Tina Campbell / Warryn Campbell	3:10
2.	"God Bless (2012 Version)"	Erica Campbell / Tina Campbell / Warryn Campbell / John Jubu Smith	3:52
3.	"Little Girl"	Erica Campbell / Tina Campbell / Warryn Campbell / John Jubu Smith	2:44
4.	"Dirt (2012 Version)"	Erica Campbell / Tina Campbell / Warryn Campbell	4:41
5.	"Can't Give Up Now (2012 Version)"	Curtis Burrell / Erica Campbell / Tina Campbell / Warryn Campbell	4:02
6.	"I'm Running (2012 Version)"	Erica Campbell / Tina Campbell / Warryn Campbell	3:34
7.	"Good to Me (featuring Destiny's Child)"	Erica Campbell / Tina Campbell / Warryn Campbell / Curtis Mayfield	4:08
8.	"Sunday Morning"	Charlie Bereal / Erica Campbell / Tina Campbell	3:06
9.	"He Said"	LaShawn Daniels / Norman Gregg / Rodney Jerkins / Nora Payne	4:25
10.	"And I (featuring Kirk Franklin)"	Erica Campbell / Tina Campbell / Warryn Campbell / Bola Sete	3:48
11.	"Walking"	Erica Campbell / Tina Campbell / Warryn Campbell / Neal Conway / Crystal Waters	3:22
12.	"God In Me (featuring Kierra Sheard)"	Erica Campbell / Warryn Campbell	3:12
13.	"Shackles (Praise You)"	Erica Campbell / Tina Campbell / Warryn Campbell	3:18
Total length:			47:22

== Personnel ==
Credits are source and adapted from allmusic.com.

Artist Credit

- Damien Alexander A&R, Operation
- GooGoo Atkins Stylist, Vocals (Background)
- Shanaté Atkins Vocals (Background)
- Charlie Bereal Composer, Producer, Various Instruments
- Little Charlie Bereal Guitar
- Adam Blackstone Bass
- Derek Blanks Photography
- Noa Bolozky Hair Stylist, Make-Up
- Chandler Bridges Assistant, Mixing Engineer
- Bruce Buechner Engineer, Mixing
- Curtis Burrell Composer
- Eric Campbell Vocals (Background)
- Erica Campbell Composer, Vocals (Background)
- Sandra Campbell Project Coordinator
- Tina Campbell Composer, Vocals (Background)
- Warryn Campbell Arranger, Composer, Drums, Executive Producer, Keyboards, Mixing, Producer, Programmer, Programming, Various Instruments, Vocal Arrangement, Vocals (Background)
- Wayne Campbell Executive Producer
- Curt Chambers Guitar
- Rob Chiarelli Mixing
- Fusako Chubachi Package Design
- Naima Cochrane Marketing
- Neal Conway Composer
- Dean Cooper Sound Design
- Sean Cooper Engineer
- Kenneth Crear Executive Producer
- AJ Crimson Make-Up
- Kevin Crouse Engineer
- James Cruz Mastering
- LaShawn Daniels Composer
- Justin Davidson Imaging
- Destiny's Child Featured Artist, Vocals (Background)
- Devin Webster Drums
- DJ Babey Drew Scratching
- DJ Reflex Scratching
- Jan Fairchild Engineer
- Fats Rap
- Paul Foley Engineer
- Kirk Franklin Featured Artist
- Norman Gregg Composer
- Jean-Marie Horvat Mixing
- Allen Jeffries Engineer
- Anthony Jeffries Engineer
- Rodney Jerkins Composer, Mixing, Producer, Rap
- Meaghan Lyons A&R, Operation
- Fabian Marasciullo Engineer
- Manny Marroquin Mixing
- Mary Mary Executive Producer, Primary Artist, Vocal Arrangement, Vocals (Background)
- Curtis Mayfield Composer
- Darrell Miller Legal Counsel
- Kim Mimble Hair Stylist
- Peter Mokran Mixing
- Tyrone Murray Marketing Consultant
- Kayla Parker Vocal Arrangement, Vocals
- Nora Payne Composer, Vocals (Background)
- Isaac Phillips Guitar
- Poke & Tone Executive Producer, Producer
- Milka Prica Stylist
- Jared Robbins Mixing
- Bola Sete Composer
- Kierra "KiKi" Sheard Featured Artist
- John Jubu Smith Composer, Guitar
- Richard "Tubbs" Smith Keyboards
- Vindell Smith Guitar
- Mitchell Solarek Management
- Tanner Underwood Assistant
- Dylan Vaughan Assistant Engineer, Mixing
- Seth Waldmann Mixing
- Eric Walls Guitar
- Crystal Waters Composer
- Dontae Winslow Horn

== Chart performance ==
=== Weekly charts ===
Chart (2012)	Peak position
US Billboard 200	16
US Top Gospel Albums (Billboard)	1
US Top R&B/Hip-Hop Albums (Billboard)	3

=== Year-end charts ===
Chart (2012)	Position
US Top Gospel Albums (Billboard)	9
US Top R&B/Hip-Hop Albums (Billboard)	53
Chart (2013)	Position
US Top Gospel Albums (Billboard)	11
US Top R&B/Hip-Hop Albums (Billboard)	84
Chart (2018)	Position
US Top Gospel Albums (Billboard)	50
Chart (2019)	Position
US Top Gospel Albums (Billboard)	33
Chart (2020)	Position
US Top Gospel Albums (Billboard)	18
Chart (2021)	Position
US Top Gospel Albums (Billboard)	15
Chart (2025)	Position
US Top Gospel Albums (Billboard)	28
