= List of awards and nominations received by Mary Mary =

Mary Mary awards and nominations
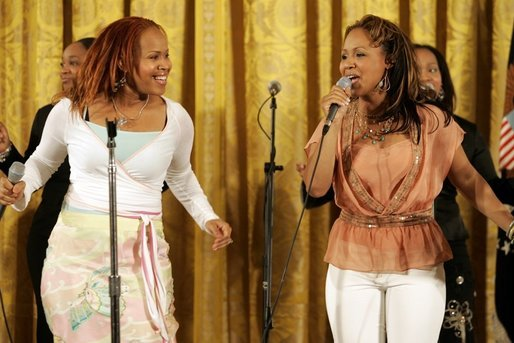
- Mary Mary performing in the White House in 2005
Awards and nominations
Award	Wins	Nominations
American Music Awards	2	5
BET	3	12
Grammy	4	11
NAACP	4	9
Soul Train	4	10

This is a list of the award history of the gospel duo, Mary Mary.

== Awards ==
=== American Music Awards ===
Year	Category	Work	Result
2001	Favorite R&B/Soul or Hip-Hop New Artist	Themselves	Nominated
2005	Favorite Contemporary Inspirational Artist	Themselves	Won
2009	Favorite Contemporary Inspirational Artist	Themselves	Won
2009	Favorite Soul/R&B Band, Duo or Group	Themselves	Nominated
2014	Favorite Gospel Artist	Themselves	Nominated

=== ASCAP Awards ===
Year	Category	Work	Result
2011	Golden Note Award	Themselves	Honored

=== BET Awards ===
Year	Category	Work	Result
2001	Best Female Group	Themselves	Nominated
2001	Best Gospel Artist	Themselves	Nominated
2003	Best Group	Themselves	Nominated
2006	Best Group	Themselves	Nominated
2006	Best Gospel Artist	Themselves	Nominated
2007	Best Gospel Artist	Themselves	Nominated
2007	Best Group	Themselves	Nominated
2009	Best Gospel Artist	Themselves	Won
2011	Best Gospel Artist	Themselves	Won
2013	Best Gospel Artist	Themselves	Won
2013	Best Artist	Themselves	Nominated
2020	Dr. Bobby Jones Best Gospel/Inspirational Award	"All In His Plan" (with PJ Morton and Le'Andria Johnson)	Nominated

=== GMA Dove Awards ===
Year	Category	Work	Result	Ref.
2001	Urban Recorded Song of the Year	"Shackles (Praise You)"	Won	
2001	Urban Album of the Year	Thankful	Won	
2002	Urban Recorded Song of the Year	"Thank You" (with Kirk Franklin)	Won	
2003	Contemporary Gospel Recorded Song of the Year	"In the Morning"	Won	
2004	Urban Recorded Song of the Year	"Dance, Dance, Dance"	Won	
2006	Contemporary Gospel Album of the Year	Mary Mary	Won	
2009	Urban Recorded Song of the Year	"Get Up"	Won	
2009	Urban Recorded Song of the Year	"Love Him Like I Do"	Nominated	
2009	Contemporary Gospel Album of the Year	The Sound	Nominated	
2009	Group of the Year	Themselves	Nominated	
2010	Artist of the Year	Themselves	Nominated	
2012	Urban Album of the Year	Something Big	Nominated	
2013	Contemporary Gospel/Urban Recorded Song of the Year	"Go Get It"	Nominated	
2020	Traditional Gospel Recorded Song of the Year	"All In His Plan" (with PJ Morton and Le'Andria Johnson)	Nominated	

=== Grammy Awards ===
Year	Category	Work	Result
2001	Best Contemporary Soul Gospel Album	Thankful	Won
2006	Best Contemporary Soul Gospel Album	Mary Mary	Nominated
2006	Best Gospel Song	"Heaven"	Nominated
2009	Best Gospel Performance	"Get Up"	Won
2009	Best Gospel Song	"Get Up"	Nominated
2009	Best Contemporary R&B Gospel Album	The Sound	Nominated
2010	Best Gospel Song	"God in Me"	Won
2012	Best Gospel Album	Something Big	Nominated
2012	Best Gospel Song	"Sitting with Me"	Nominated
2013	Best Gospel/Contemporary Christian Music Performance	"Go Get It"	Nominated
2013	Best Gospel Song	"Go Get It"	Won

=== MOBO Awards ===
Year	Category	Work	Result
2000	Best Gospel Act	Themselves	Won
2001	Best Gospel Act	Themselves	Won
2006	Best Gospel Act	Themselves	Nominated
2009	Best Gospel Act	Themselves	Nominated

=== NAACP Image Awards ===
Year	Category	Work	Result
2001	Outstanding Duo or Group	Themselves	Nominated
2003	Outstanding Duo or Group	Themselves	Nominated
2003	Outstanding Gospel Artist	Themselves	Nominated
2006	Outstanding Gospel Artist	Themselves	Nominated
2009	Outstanding Gospel Artist	Themselves	Won
2010	Outstanding Song	"God In Me"	Won
2012	Outstanding Gospel Album (Traditional or Contemporary)	Something Big	Nominated
2013	Outstanding Gospel Album (Traditional or Contemporary)	Go Get It	Won
2013	Duo, Group or Collaboration	Themselves	Won

=== Soul Train Awards ===
Year	Category	Work	Result
Soul Train Awards
2001	Best Gospel Album	Thankful	Nominated
2009	Best Gospel Performance	"God In Me"	Won
2009	Best Collaboration	"God In Me"	Nominated
2009	Song of the Year	"God In Me"	Nominated
2011	Best Gospel Performance	"Walking"	Won
2011	Best Dance Performance	"Walking"	Nominated
Soul Train Lady of Soul Awards
2001	Best Gospel Album	Thankful	Won
2001	Best R&B/Soul or Rap New Duo or Group	Themselves	Won
2001	Best R&B/Soul Single Duo or Group	"Shackles (Praise You)"	Nominated
2003	Best Gospel Album	Incredible	Nominated

=== Stellar Awards ===
Year	Category	Work	Result
2001	New Artist of the Year	Themselves	Won
2001	Group/Duo of the Year	Themselves	Won
2001	Contemporary Group/Duo of the Year	Themselves	Won
2001	Artist of the Year	Themselves	Nominated
2001	Contemporary CD of the Year	Thankful	Won
2001	Music Video of the Year	"Shackles (Praise You)"	Nominated
2004	Contemporary Group/Duo of the Year	Themselves	Won
2004	Artist of the Year	Themselves	Nominated
2004	Group Duo of the Year	Themselves	Nominated
2004	Urban/Inspirational Performance of the Year	"Incredible"	Nominated
2006	Urban/Inspirational Single / Performance of the Year	"Heaven"; Mary Mary	Won
2006	CD Of The Year	Mary Mary	Nominated
2006	Artist Of The Year	Themselves	Nominated
2006	Group Duo of the Year	Themselves	Nominated
2006	Song of the Year	"Heaven"	Nominated
2010	Song of the Year	Themselves	Won
2010	Group/Duo of the Year	Themselves	Won
2010	Contemporary Group/Duo of the Year	Themselves	Won
2010	Urban/Inspirational Single / Performance of the Year	"God In Me"	Won
2012	Group/Duo of the Year	Themselves	Won
2012	Contemporary Group/Duo of the Year	Themselves	Won
2012	Artist of the Year	Themselves	Nominated
2012	CD of the Year	Something Big	Nominated
2012	Contemporary CD of the Year	Something Big	Nominated
2012	Urban/Inspirational Performance of the Year	"Walking"	Nominated
2013	Urban/Inspirational Single / Performance of the Year	"Go Get It"	Won
2013	Song of the Year	"Go Get It"	Nominated
2013	Group/Duo of the Year	Themselves	Won
2013	Special Event CD of the Year	Themselves	Won
2013	Contemporary Group/Duo of the Year	Themselves	Won
2013	Contemporary CD of the Year	Go Get It	Won
2021	Song of the Year	"All In His Plan" (with PJ Morton and Lea'Andria Johnson)	Nominated

=== Miscellaneous honors ===
Year	Organization	Award	Nominated work	Result
2025	Missouri Gospel Music Hall of Fame		Themselves	Inducted
