= Teddy Campbell =

American drummer

- Also known as: Teddy, Eddy
- Born: Glendon Theodore Campbell; February 24, 1975 (age 51); Chicago, Illinois
- Genres: Pop, gospel, R&B, soul, jazz, Christian
- Instruments: Drums, vocals
- Member of: The Soul Seekers, Tina Campbell
- Spouse: Tina Campbell (m. 2000; div. 2026)
- Website: www.size13music.com/teddycampbell/

Glendon Theodore "Teddy" Campbell Sr. (born February 24, 1975) is a gospel drummer & singer. He was the drummer on The Tonight Show with Jay Leno. He is the lead singer for the Soul Seekers.

== Biography ==
Christian Youth M.B. of Chicago, is where Teddy Campbell's love of music, and learning to play the drums as a child, began. For the past 7 years, Campbell was seen on The Tonight Show with Jay Leno as a member of the live house band. Campbell was the drummer for the newly formed Tonight Show band led by Rickey Minor. He is now a drummer on American Idol.

== Album credits ==
- Kelly Clarkson – Thankful
- Deborah Cox – The Morning After
- George Duke – Duke
- Euge Groove – Play Date
- Herbie Hancock – Possibilities
- Paul Jackson Jr. – Still Small Voice
- Al Jarreau – All I Got
- Mary Mary – Incredible
- Mary Mary – Mary Mary
- Mary Mary – "Put a Little Love in Your Heart" from Stuart Little 2 soundtrack
- Stacie Orrico – Stacie Orrico
- Sisqó – Return of Dragon
- Rod Stewart – "When I Need You" from If We Fall in Love Tonight
- Kirk Whalum – Unconditional
- Stevie Wonder – A Time to Love
- So Amazing: An All-Star Tribute to Luther Vandross
- VH1 Divas Las Vegas

== Tour experience ==
- The Backstreet Boys
- Christina Aguilera
- 98 Degrees
- Maze featuring Frankie Beverly
- LSG (Gerald Levert, Keith Sweat, Johnny Gill)
- Dakota Moon
- Britney Spears
- Bette Midler
- Queen Latifah
- Boz Scaggs

== Musical director experience ==
- Britney Spears
- 98 Degrees
- Mary Mary
- Deborah Cox
- Kelly Price
- Ann Nesby (formerly of Sounds of Blackness)
- Michael Mathews Gospel Stage Play Sneaky starring Ali Woodson ( formerly of The Temptations )
- Howard Hewitt Fake Friends starring Shirley Murdock.

== Television performances ==
- The Tonight Show with Jay Leno: The Backstreet Boys, Christina Aguilera, Michael Bolton, Yolanda Adams, Shaquille O'Neal, Heather Headley, Ashanti, P-Diddy
- Late Night with David Letterman: Christina Aguilera, The Backstreet Boys
- Saturday Night Live 2003: Christina Aguilera
- MTV TRL 2000: 98 Degrees
- The View: The Backstreet Boys
- The Today Show: 98 Degrees, The Backstreet Boys
- The Image Awards, 2002–2003: House Band
- The Essence Awards 2003: House Band
- The American Music Awards, 2000–2001: Christina Aguilera (2000), Yolanda Adams (2001)
- Soul Train Lady of Soul 2001: Mary Mary
- FOX presents Ali 50th Birthday Bash, 2001: Mariah Carey, Natalie Cole
- The Kennedy Center Honors, 2002: The Quincy Jones Quartet – Stevie Wonder & Ray Charles
- BET Walk of Fame Honoring Luther Vandross: Patti LaBelle, Luther Vandross, Chaka Khan
- VH1 Disco Ball 2003: House Band
- 2001 Billboard Awards: All Star Performance "What's Goin On" N'sync, Gwen Stefani of (No Doubt), Nelly, Destiny's Child, Mary J. Blige
- 2002 Billboard Awards: Tribute to Run DMC (w/ Steven Tyler/Joe Perry of Aerosmith) Ja Rule, Nelly, Busta Rhymes, Naughty By Nature, Queen Latifah
- Rosie O'Donnell, 1998, 2000–2001: Dakota Moon, Christina Aguilera, Mary Mary
- CBS, Home for The Holidays 2000-2001-2002: Josh Groban, Charlotte Church, Faith Hill, Destiny's Child, Kirk Franklin, Usher, Billy Gilman, Melissa Etheridge
- VH1 Divas Live, 2002: Celine Dion, Cher, Shakira, The Dixie Chicks, Mary J. Blige, Anastacia
- VH1 Diva Duets 2003: Celine Dion, Whitney Houston, Chaka Khan, Beyoncé, Ashanti, Mary J. Blige, Jewel, Lisa Marie Presley, Shania Twain, Stevie Wonder
- FOX's American Idol
- NBC's America's Got Talent
- 2006 GRAMMY Awards with Herbie Hancock and Christina Aguilera
- The Ellen DeGeneres Show, 2006: Jamie Foxx
- Tonight Show with Jay Leno, 2006: Jamie Foxx
- Be on the lookout for Teddy on the upcoming FOX's "Celebrity Duets" show

== Personal life ==
Teddy Campbell is married to Trecina "Tina" Atkins-Campbell of the highly acclaimed contemporary gospel duo, Mary Mary. They married in 2000. He has his eldest daughter (from a previous relationship) named Cierra. Together they have four children. Laiah Simone Campbell, Meela Jane Campbell, and Theodore (named after previous generations; he is also known as "TJ") and Santana Campbell. In April 2026, Teddy filed for divorce.
