= It's Personal =

Studio album by Tina Campbell
- Released: May 21, 2015
- Recorded: 2014
- Genre: Christian R&B, urban gospel, contemporary gospel
- Length: 58:45
- Label: Gee Tree

Tina Campbell chronology
It's Personal (2015)	Christmas at Our House (2022)

It's Personal is the debut studio album by Tina Campbell. Gee Tree Creative released the album on May 21, 2015.

Upon its release, It's Personal received generally favorable reviews from music critics, with most praise directed toward its songwriting quality and Campbell's vocal performance. The album reached number one on the US Top Gospel Albums chart. Among numerous additional accolades, it won Outstanding Gospel Album – Traditional or Contemporary at the 48th NAACP Image Awards (2016) while "Too Hard Not To" received a nomination for Best Gospel Performance/Song at the 60th Annual Grammy Awards in 2018. The album was reissued and retitled It's Still Personal in September 2017.

It's Personal produced six singles. "Destiny" topped the US Gospel Digital Song Sales chart, while "I'll Wait" and "Love Love Love" peaked within the top thirty positions on the chart. "Speak the Word" became her second entry on the US Hot Gospel Songs, peaking at number twenty-four. "Too Hard Not To" peaked at number two on the US Gospel Digital Song Sales chart, while "We Livin'" peaked at number seventeen. To further promote It's Personal, Campbell embarked on her An Evening with Tina Campbell Tour in October 2016. The tour was succeeded by the short-lived It's Still Personal Tour, which was canceled due to low-ticket sales.

== Critical reception ==
Professional ratings
Review scores
Source	Rating
AllMusic	3.5/5 stars
Cross Rhythms	9/10 squares

Awarding the album three and a half stars from AllMusic, David Jeffries states, "Released in the era of early leaks for albums, Tina Campbell's solo debut made news when it actually missed its street date, but that's the only stumble made by this 2015 release, as Mary Mary fans will likely embrace this solid splinter effort." Tony Cummings, giving the album a nine out of ten at Cross Rhythms, writes, "The album closes with Tina literally praying over a piano backing and all but the most jaundiced of listeners will be moved by a brave, and deeply personal, album."

== Accolades ==
Campbell was awarded an NAACP Image Awards for her debut one for Outstanding Gospel Album and two Stellar awards for Traditional Female Vocalist and Traditional CD of the Year.

== Track listing ==
Track list - It's Personal
No.	Title	Length
1.	"Holy Spirit"	4:07
2.	"Only Jesus Did It"	5:40
3.	"Love Love Love" (featuring Stevie Wonder)	3:55
4.	"Woh Oh Oh"	4:38
5.	"Life"	4:49
6.	"Destiny"	4:01
7.	"I'll Wait"	5:03
8.	"I'll Call You Jesus"	6:45
9.	"Speak the Word" (featuring Teddy Campbell)	5:12
10.	"I'm Everything with Ya" (featuring Thomasina "Honey" Atkins)	4:26
11.	"Forever More"	7:27
12.	"The Prayer/Aaron's Worship"	2:22
Total length:		58:45

Track list - It's Still Personal
No.	Title	Length
1.	"Destiny"	4:01
2.	"Evidence"	3:50
3.	"Woh Oh Oh"	4:26
4.	"Life"	4:33
5.	"We Livin"	3:28
6.	"Love Love Love" (featuring Stevie Wonder)	3:55
7.	"Holy Spirit"	4:08
8.	"Only Jesus Did It"	5:44
9.	"I'll Wait"	5:02
10.	"I Call You Jesus"	6:48
11.	"Too Hard Not To"	4:27
12.	"Speak the Word" (featuring Teddy Campbell)	5:12
13.	"I'm Everythang With Ya" (featuring Thomasina "Honey" Atkins)	4:28
14.	"Forevermore"	7:51
15.	"The Prayer (Aaron's Worship)"	2:21
Total length:		70:13

== Chart performance ==
Chart (2015)	Peak position
US Billboard 200	90
US Top Gospel Albums (Billboard)	1
US Independent Albums (Billboard)	10
