= Alaché =

Nigerian-American Christian musician (born 1982)

- Also known as: Alaché
- Born: Anne Alaché Jon Ode; November 5, 1982 (age 43); Nigeria
- Origin: Fairfax, Virginia
- Genres: Christian R&B, Christian pop, contemporary R&B, urban contemporary gospel
- Occupation(s): Singer, songwriter
- Instrument: Vocals
- Years active: 2005–present
- Labels: Naava, M.A.D.E.
- Website: alache.com

Anne Alaché Jon Ode (born November 5, 1982), who goes by the stage name Alaché, is a Nigerian-American Christian musician and Christian R&B recording artist from Fairfax, Virginia, who plays a Christian pop style of contemporary R&B and urban contemporary gospel music. She released, The Chronicles of the Mrs., an extended play, in 2015, with M.A.D.E. Entertainment.

== Early and personal life ==
She was born, Anne Alaché Jon Ode, on November 5, 1982, in Nigeria, to an Air Force General father and a mother who is a fashion designer, while has since relocated to Fairfax, Virginia, where she is pursuing her music career and raising her two daughters with her husband, Audu Emmanuel Mark.

== Music career ==
Her music recording career started in 2005, but she did not gain attention until 2015, with the extended play, The Chronicles of the Mrs., on November 27, 2015, from M.A.D.E. Entertainment. She has released one studio album, It Is What It Is: My Life, in 2006, with Naava Music.

== Discography ==
Studio albums

- It Is What It Is: My Life (2006, Naava)

EPs

- The Chronicles of the Mrs. (November 27, 2015, M.A.D.E.)
