= Back to You (Mary Mary song) =

"Back To You"

Single by Mary Mary

from the album Ben-Hur: Original Motion Picture Soundtrack
- Released: July 21, 2016
- Recorded: 2016
- Length: 3:39
- Label: D3 Entertainment Group
- Songwriters: Warryn Campbell, Dorinda Clark-Cole, Elbernita Clark
- Producer: Warryn Campbell

Mary Mary singles chronology
"Go Get It" (2012)	"Back To You" (2016)

"Back to You" is a single by American R&B/gospel duo Mary Mary. This is Mary Mary's first song in four years since 2012 single "Go Get It". The song was released on July 21, 2016 for the 2016 film remake of Ben-Hur. The song was written and produced by Warryn Campbell.

== Music video ==
The official music video was released on Mary Mary's second YouTube account on July 21, 2016.

== Promotion ==
On July 22, 2016, Mary Mary performed the song on The Preachers.
