= Christian R&B =

Music genre

Christian rhythm and blues
- Stylistic origins: Rhythm and blues, gospel
- Cultural origins: 1940s–1950s, United States
- Typical instruments: Drum kit, bass guitar, saxophone, horns, piano, organ, electric guitar, vocals, background vocals

Fusion genres
- Hip hop soul, soul music, contemporary Rhythm and Blues, urban contemporary gospel,

Christian R&B (also known as gospel R&B, rhythm & praise music, and R&P) is a subgenre of rhythm and blues music consisting of tracks with Christian-based lyrics or by musicians typically known for writing such songs. Music in this genre intends to uplift, entertain, or to give a Christian perspective on a topic. Christian R&B could be considered a subgenre of gospel music, or a cross-genre under both gospel and R&B.

== Origin and musical style ==
Gospel music is one of the roots or influences of R&B music. While it might seem as if Christian R&B should be the subgenre of gospel music, R&B is rooted in several music genres and has developed over the decades, making its musical characteristics audibly different from the musical nuances of gospel music. Yet some modern musicians mix R&B elements with gospel music elements.

R&B originated between the 1940s and 1950s, and Christian R&B followed close behind. Christian rhythm and blues have the same musical characteristics heard in regular or secular R&B music, with the only major difference between the two being the lyrics. Some Christians who perform R&B may not explicitly mention God, Jesus Christ, or other overtly religious terms, but their lyrics still fit within the Christian moral standards, or may be ethically neutral.

A few early gospel R&B musicians can be found as far back as the 1950s. One R&B vocal group, for example, known as the Orioles, sang "gospel-styled reworkings of songs that had been popular country, blues, or R&B songs." In 1953, the Orioles recorded a gospel song called "Crying in the Chapel"; yet the band was considered to be R&B.

A strong influence on the merging of gospel and R&B came from Sam Cooke. He started out as the lead singer for the gospel group Soul Stirrers, but had always loved blues and jazz. He would incorporate elements from these two musical styles into his gospel recordings. Even though he was making a nice living, he wanted to venture into secular music. In 1956, for fear he would upset his fans, bandmates, and his record label, he released his first R&B single (called "Lovable") under the assumed name 'Dale Cooke'. Because his voice is distinctive, people were not fooled by the name Dale Cooke.

Soon, other singers followed Cooke's footsteps, crossing over from gospel to R&B/soul and merging the two. Ray Charles, Aretha Franklin and James Brown are other important figures who combined gospel and R&B.

In the early age of R&B, the musicality distinguishing gospel from R&B was blurred. There was little or no way to tell whether a person was listening to gospel music or R&B music, unless they paid close attention to the lyrics.

== Nomenclature ==
The term rhythm and praise is not merely an offshoot of the term rhythm and blues, but also has a spiritual meaning for the musicians specializing in this form of music. Blues, or singing the blues, is attributed to sadness, depression, hopelessness, loneliness, or worrisome. For some Christians, music should not invoke depression but rather inspire praise to God, as referenced in the following biblical scriptures:

- Psalms 47:6
- Acts 16:25
- Ephesians 5:18-19
- Philippians 4:8 - Finally, brothers, whatever is true, whatever is noble, whatever is right, whatever is pure, whatever is lovely, whatever is admirable—if anything is excellent or praiseworthy—think about such things.
- Ephesians 4:29 - Let no unwholesome word proceed from your mouth, but only such a word as is good for edification according to the need of the moment, so that it will give grace to those who hear.

The last two biblical passages above are not talking about music specifically, but may set a benchmark from which Christian artists write their lyrics. This is not to say Christian musicians do not sing about their troubles and pains; what sets them apart from many other singers is that the Christian artist is inclined to lyrically mention God or Jesus Christ as the solution to their burdens, providing hope to listeners who may be going through a similar hardship. In his book Sound of Light, Don Cusic writes:

Contemporary Christianity tends to ignore some aspects of the [biblical book of] Psalms—the themes for revenge, fear, doubting, frustration, and outrage. Yet these are all part of the Psalms, although modern songwriters prefer to emphasize only the praise and worship aspects of the Psalms. Still, the Psalms show us songs of individual expression, of earthly concerns, of personal cries of pain and help.

In an interview with Sketch the Journalist on the Houston Chronicle, DJ D-Lite stated that the term Rhythm & Praise originated from the gospel singing duo Dawkins and Dawkins on their album Focus (released in 1998), with one of the songs being entitled The Rhythm and the Praise. He goes on to say that, from there, artists made it a subgenre, calling it R&P for short.

Despite musicians’ reason to use the term praise over blues, no historical texts about rhythm and blues would associate the genre’s name to sadness. The original term for this style of music was race music, because it was predominantly performed by African-Americans. People found that term to be offensive. In the late 1940s, Jerry Wexler, a writer for the Billboard music magazine who would later become a record producer, coined the term rhythm and blues as a way to describe the music. It is probable that the rhythm part of the name rhythm and blues described the music’s up-tempo vibe of that time. The term blues of the genre is probably borrowed from jump blues music, since jump blues evolved into R&B. Most music services, music websites, and even entertainment companies do not recognize rhythm & praise as an official music subgenre, leaving people to categorize this music instead as Christian/R&B, Gospel/R&B, Contemporary Christian/Contemporary Rhythm and Blues, Urban Contemporary Gospel, or any variation of these.

== Public reaction and acceptance ==
The success of a person's Christian music is partly based on how the songs are composed and who is performing those songs. Even secular R&B artists are known to record Christian music. There are Christian singers with a balanced R&B and contemporary gospel blend whereas other singers fuse hip hop with contemporary R&B, a combination that has been in existence since the 1980s. Singers in the former will mainly attract those who prefer gospel music, and singers in the latter appeal to those who favor hip-hop and contemporary R&B. Some artists, like Canton Jones, tend to alternate between both combinations, which may have garnered him a relatively larger audience than those who fuse gospel sounds only or hip-hop sounds only.

=== Religious reaction ===
Many people continuously listen to their favorite style of music after professing their Christian faith. They begin to find sacred music of the same genre. This would mean that those who listen to R&B music could still do so after their religious conversion, embracing artists like J. Moss, Canton Jones, Mary Mary, One Nation Crew, 21:03, Mali Music, Cynthia Jones, and Debra Killings.

Some Christian circles believe certain musical styles are inherently immoral, even if positive lyrics are being sung over the music. They say genres like rap, rock, blues and R&B should not mix with Christian music and that music should never veer away from the topic of Jesus, praise, or worship. In light of this info, it is no surprise that secular artists are backlashed after releasing gospel records. Several R&B artists like Aretha Franklin, Al Green, Shirley Murdock, Dave Hollister, Michelle Williams, Shei Atkins, Kelly Price, Coko, James Ingram, and Montell Jordan are said to have straddled the fence.

In 2012, gospel singer Johnny Mo appeared on Christian television program Atlanta Live singing a Christian imitation of R. Kelly's 1994 hit "Bump n' Grind", titled "I Don't See Nothing Wrong with Living for Jesus". Some of the comments on Madame Noir supported this song while others rejected it. One of the issues that some Christian music listeners may have with listening to Christianized versions of secular music is that the newer Christian version may cause the listener to have a flashback, tempting that listener to commit behaviors they no longer wish to enact.

=== Secular reaction ===
Devout Christians are not the only ones enjoying Christian/gospel music. As one blogger who claims to be a black atheist said, "It's not about the message. It's about the sound and the feeling." He goes on to say that although he doesn't believe in a god nor in the testimonies of gospel artists, he accepts gospel music because it is rooted in his African heritage.

It is generally known that people listen to music that they can relate to. In this case, non-Christians and those who aren't serious about the faith may sometimes come across Christian music that affects them in emotions (giving them hope) or entertainment (loving the style of music without necessarily caring for the lyrics).

Mary Mary, the R&B/gospel singing duo, released their single "God in Me" in 2008, featuring Kierra "KiKi" Sheard. On the Billboard charts, the song peaked at No. 68 on the Hot 100 chart, reached the top 5 on the Hot R&B/Hip-Hop Songs chart during its 43rd week, and went No. 1 on both the Dance Club Songs and Hot Gospel Songs charts. Mary Mary had another popular song, "Shackles (Praise You)", released between 1999 and 2000, peaking at No. 9 on the Hot R&B/Hip-Hop Songs chart and No. 28 on the Hot 100 chart.

Yolanda Adams is another popular R&B/gospel singer, whose successes include four albums that reached the top 10 on the Top R&B/Hip-Hop Albums Billboard chart. Her album Mountain High, Valley Low was on the chart for 94 weeks and peaked at No. 5. Her album Believe remained on the chart for 67 weeks and peaked at No. 7. Day By Day charted for 58 weeks and peaked at No. 4, and The Best of Me peaked at No. 9 while being on the chart for 18 weeks.

Without going into further chart performances for other R&B/gospel musicians, the two examples above reveal that these songs/albums were not only played on gospel channels, and that they were received by secular audiences. Other musicians whose music charted among the top 10 or close to the top 10 R&B/Hip-Hop songs and the top 10 R&B/Hip-Hop Albums are Oleta Adams, J. Moss, Trin-i-tee 5:7, BeBe Winans, and CeCe Winans.

== See also ==
- Urban contemporary gospel
