= A Mary Mary Christmas =

Studio album by Mary Mary
- Released: October 10, 2006
- Genre: Christmas
- Length: 38:20
- Label: Columbia
- Producer: Warryn Campbell (also exec.)

Mary Mary chronology
Mary Mary (2005)	A Mary Mary Christmas (2006)	The Sound (2008)

A Mary Mary Christmas is the fourth studio album by American duo Mary Mary. It was released by Columbia Records on October 10, 2006 in the United States. The album is a follow-up to their self-titled third album (2005). Produced by Warryn Campbell, it is Mary Mary's first Christmas album and consists of eleven tracks, featuring original songs co-penned with Campbell as well as cover versions of Christmas standards and carols. In 2007, A Mary Mary Christmas was nominated for a Dove Award for Christmas Album of the Year at the 38th GMA Dove Awards.

== Critical reception ==
Professional ratings
Review scores
Source	Rating
AllMusic	3.5/5 stars

Tim Sendra from AllMusic gave A Mary Mary Christmas a three and a half out of five stars rating. He found that "A Mary Mary Christmas is filled with plenty of joy and excitement," also noting: "While A Mary Mary Christmas is a solid addition to the holiday CD blizzard, a few more originals and fewer classics would have made it even more enjoyable."

== Track listing ==
All tracks are produced by Warryn Campbell

No.	Title	Writer(s)	Length
1.	"'Tis the Season"	Erica Campbell; Trecina Campbell; W. Campbell	3:05
2.	"Only One"	E. Campbell; T. Campbell; W. Campbell	2:19
3.	"Have Yourself a Merry Little Christmas" (featuring Dontaé Winslow)	Hugh Martin; Ralph Blane	2:26
4.	"O Come All Ye Faithful"	John Francis Wade	4:05
5.	"California Christmas"	E. Campbell; T. Campbell; W. Campbell	3:12
6.	"Still the Lamb" (featuring Bishop Kenneth C. Ulmer)	E. Campbell; T. Campbell; W. Campbell	5:20
7.	"Call Him Jesus"	E. Campbell; T. Campbell; W. Campbell	4:23
8.	"The Real Thing"	Marvin Winans	3:22
9.	"Hark the Herald Angels Sing"	Charles Wesley	3:35
10.	"Carol of the Bells"	Mykola Leontovych	3:22
11.	"California Christmas (Remix)" (featuring Damani)	E. Campbell; T. Campbell; W. Campbell	3:11
Total length:			38:20

== Charts ==
=== Weekly charts ===
Chart (2006)	Peak position
US Billboard 200	148
US Christian Albums (Billboard)	7
US Top Gospel Albums (Billboard)	2
US Top R&B/Hip-Hop Albums (Billboard)	33

=== Year-end charts ===
Chart (2007)	Position
US Top Gospel Albums (Billboard)	21
