= Grammy Award for Best Gospel Song =

Music award category

- Awarded for: quality gospel songs
- Country: United States
- Presented by: National Academy of Recording Arts and Sciences
- First award: 2006
- Final award: 2014
- Website: grammy.com

The Grammy Award for Best Gospel Song is an honor presented at the Grammy Awards, a ceremony that was established in 1958 and originally called the Gramophone Awards, to recording artists for quality songs in the gospel music genre. Honors in several categories are presented at the ceremony annually by the National Academy of Recording Arts and Sciences of the United States to "honor artistic achievement, technical proficiency and overall excellence in the recording industry, without regard to album sales or chart position".

The award, reserved for songwriters, was first presented to James Harris III, Terry Lewis, James Q. Wright, and Yolanda Adams at the 48th Grammy Awards in 2006, for the song "Be Blessed" performed by Yolanda Adams. According to the category description guide for the 52nd Grammy Awards, the song "must contain melody and lyrics and must be either a new song or a song first achieving prominence during the eligibility year. Songs containing prominent samples or interpolations are not eligible."

From 2012, the category was split into the Best Gospel Song and Best Contemporary Christian Music Song categories; the latter was a newly formed category as part of a major overhaul of Grammy categories, to make a clear distinction between traditional, old-style gospel songs and contemporary gospel songs.

Further changes in the Gospel/Contemporary Christian Music genre field will lead to a merger between this category and the Best Gospel/Contemporary Christian Music Performance in 2015 into the new Best Gospel Performance/Song category, which will recognize Gospel performances and songwriting. According to the Grammy committee, "changes to the field were made in the interest of clarifying the criteria, representing the current culture and creative DNA of the gospel and Contemporary Christian Music communities, and better reflecting the diversity and authenticity of today's gospel music industry".

== Recipients ==
Year^{[I]}	Winning songwriter(s)	Work	Performing artist(s)^{[II]}	Other nominees^{[III]}	Ref.
2006	Yolanda Adams; James Harris III; Terry Lewis; James Q. Wright	"Be Blessed"	Yolanda Adams	Israel Houghton & Aaron Lindsey – "Again I Say Rejoice" (Israel & New Breed); Erica Campbell, Joi Campbell, Trecina Campbell & Warryn Campbell – "Heaven" (Mary Mary); Joeworn Martin – "Lift Him Up" (Hezekiah Walker & Love Fellowship Choir); James Moss – "We Must Praise" (J. Moss)	
2007	Kirk Franklin	"Imagine Me"	Kirk Franklin	Donald Lawrence – "The Blessing Of Abraham" (Donald Lawrence & The Tri-City Singers); Brown Bannister & Mac Powell – "Mountain of God" (Third Day); Israel Houghton & Aaron Lindsey – "Not Forgotten" (Israel & New Breed); Tye Tribbett – "Victory" (Tye Tribbett)	
2008	Karen Clark-Sheard	"Blessed & Highly Favored"	The Clark Sisters	Mark Hall & Bernie Herms – "East To West" (Casting Crowns); Donald Lawrence – "Encourage Yourself" (Donald Lawrence & The Tri-City Singers); Cary Barlowe, Toby McKeehan, Jamie Moore & Aaron Rice – "Made To Love" (TobyMac); James L. Moss – "Praise On The Inside" (J. Moss)	
2009	Kirk Franklin	"Help Me Believe"	Kirk Franklin	James L. Moss – "Cover Me" (21:03 With Fred Hammond, Smokie Norful and J. Moss); Erica Campbell, Joi Campbell, Trecina Campbell & Warryn Campbell – "Get Up" (Mary Mary); Brandon Heath – "Give Me Your Eyes" (Brandon Heath); Steven Curtis Chapman & MercyMe – "You Reign" (MercyMe)	
2010	Erica Campbell; Tina Campbell; Warryn Campbell	"God In Me"	Mary Mary featuring Kierra "Kiki" Sheard	Tai Anderson, David Carr, Mark Lee & Mac Powell – "Born Again" (Third Day featuring Lacey Mosley); Cary Barlowe, Toby McKeehan & Jamie Moore – "City On Our Knees" (TobyMac); Dayna Caddell, Israel Houghton, Aaron Lindsey & Ricardo Sanche – "Give Me Your Eyes" (Israel Houghton & Mary Mary); Jason Houser, Sam Mizell & Matthew Wes – "The Motions" (Matthew West)	
2011	Jerry Peters; Kirk Whalum	"It's What I Do"	Kirk Whalum & Lalah Hathaway	Lisa Gungor & Michael Gungor – "Beautiful Things" (Gungor); Sarah Hart & Chapin Hartford – "Better Than Hallelujah" (Amy Grant); Jonas Myrin, Matt Redman, Jesse Reeves & Chris Tomlin – "Our God" (Chris Tomlin); Gordon Kennedy – "Return to Sender" (Ricky Skaggs)	
2012	Kirk Franklin	"Hello Fear"	Kirk Franklin	Kirk Franklin – "Hello Fear" (Kirk Franklin); Erica Campbell, Tina Campbell, Gerald Haddon & Tammi Haddon – "Sitting With Me" (Mary Mary); Donald Lawrence – "Spiritual" (Donald Lawrence & Co., ft. Blanche McAllister-Dykes); Richard Smallwood – "Trust Me" (Richard Smallwood & Vision); Canton Jones – "Window" (Canton Jones)	
2013	Erica Campbell, Tina Campbell & Warryn Campbell	"Go Get It"	Mary Mary	Cheryl Fortune, James Fortune & Terence Vaughn – "Hold On" (James Fortune & FIYA Featuring Monica & Fred Hammond); Phillip Feaster, Fred Hammond, Jonathan Miller & Calvin Rodgers – "I Feel Good" (Fred Hammond); Aaron Lindsey & Marvin Sapp – "My Testimony" (Marvin Sapp); Donald Lawrence – "Released" (Bill Winston & Living Word Featuring Donald Lawrence)	
2014	Tye Tribbett	"If He Did It Before...Same God" (Live)	Tye Tribbett	Calvin Frazier & Deitrick Haddon – "Have Your Way" (Deitrick Haddon); Wirlie Morris, Michael Paran, Charlie Wilson & Mahim Wilson – "If I Believe" (Charlie Wilson); Erica Campbell, Tina Campbell & Warryn Campbell – "A Little More Jesus" (Erica Campbell); Percy Bady – "Still" (Percy Bady featuring Lowell Pye)	

- ^{^[I]} Each year is linked to the article about the Grammy Awards held that year.
- ^{^[II]} The performing artist is listed but, unless they wrote or co-wrote the song, does not receive the award.
- ^{^[III]} Showing the name of the songwriter(s), the nominated song and in parentheses the performer's name(s).

== See also ==
- Grammy Award for Best Gospel/Contemporary Christian Music Performance
- Grammy Award for Best Contemporary Christian Music Performance/Song
- Grammy Award for Best Contemporary Christian Music Song
- Grammy Award for Song of the Year
