= God in Me =

Single by Mary Mary featuring Kierra Sheard

from the album The Sound
- Released: November 2008
- Recorded: 2008
- Genre: Contemporary gospel; R&B
- Length: 3:11
- Label: My Block/Columbia
- Songwriters: Warryn Campbell; Erica Campbell; Tina Campbell
- Producer: Warryn Campbell

Mary Mary singles chronology
| "I Worship You" (2008) | "God in Me" (2008) | "Seattle" (2009) |

Kierra "KiKi" Sheard singles chronology
| "Love Like Crazy" (2009) | "God in Me" (2009) | "Invisible" (2009) |

"God in Me" is a song by American contemporary gospel duo Mary Mary featuring American gospel singer Kierra "Kiki" Sheard. It was released as the third single from their fourth studio album The Sound (2008), and was also featured on their greatest hits album Go Get It (2012). and was written by both Mary Mary and producer Warryn Campbell, husband of member Erica Campbell. The single is the group's first to chart on the Billboard Hot 100 since their debut single, "Shackles", charted in 2000. The song won Song of the Year at the 25th Annual Stellar Awards.

== Music video ==
The music video for "God in Me" is about expressing individuality during a fashion show. It features appearances by Flex Alexander, Kanye West, Amber Rose, Common, Heavy D, and Fonzworth Bentley. America's Next Top Model, Cycle 11 runner-up Samantha Potter also made an appearance in the video. It ranked at #60 on BET's Notarized: Top 100 Videos of 2009 countdown.

== Remixes ==
- Official Remix featuring Ne-Yo & Kierra Sheard (3:19)
- Remix featuring Sean Ray
- Unofficial remix with ThaGIM (3.00)
- Dave Audé Club Mix (7:46)
- DJ Escape & Tony Coluccio Club Mix (8:26)
- Jamie J Sanchez Club Mix (7:49)
- Mathias Heilbron Club Mix (8:49)
- Richard Vission Club Mix (6:00)

== Chart performance ==
The song has been a major success, and became the first song since their debut single "Shackles (Praise You)" to chart on the Billboard Hot 100, peaking at number 68. The song also spent 76 weeks on the Billboard Hot R&B/Hip-Hop Songs, and peaked at #5. It reached the Top 10 of the chart in its 42nd week, the longest climb to the top tier in the survey's 67-year history. It also was #1 on both the Hot Gospel Songs and Hot Dance Club Play charts.

== Charts ==
=== Weekly charts ===
| Chart (2008–2009) | Peak position |
|---|---|
| US Billboard Hot 100 | 68 |
| US Dance Club Songs (Billboard) | 1 |
| US Hot R&B/Hip-Hop Songs (Billboard) | 5 |

=== Year-end charts ===
| Chart (2009) | Position |
|---|---|
| US Hot R&B/Hip-Hop Songs (Billboard) | 13 |
| Chart (2010) | Position |
| US Hot R&B/Hip-Hop Songs (Billboard) | 60 |
