= Incredible (Mary Mary album) =

Studio album by Mary Mary
- Released: July 16, 2002
- Genre: Urban gospel; R&B
- Length: 68:59
- Label: Columbia
- Producer: Warryn Campbell (also exec.); Kenneth Crear (exec.); Charlie Bereal; Kenny Bereal; Mike City; Rodney Jerkins

Mary Mary chronology
Thankful (2000)	Incredible (2002)	Mary Mary (2005)

Incredible is the second studio album by American duo Mary Mary. It was released by Columbia Records on July 16, 2002 in the United States. Originally titled The Evolution of Mary Mary, the duo reteamed with Warryn Campbell to work on the majority of the album, with Charlie Bereal, Kenny Bereal, Mike City and Rodney Jerkins providing additional production. Incredible peaked at number 20 on the US Billboard 200, selling 43,000 copies in its first week, and was eventually certified gold by the Recording Industry Association of America (RIAA). The album features the singles "In the Morning" and "I Try".

== Critical reception ==
Professional ratings
Review scores
Source	Rating
Allmusic	4/5 stars
Cross Rhythms	9/10 stars

Tim A. Smith from Allmusic found that the project's "music aptly fits its title, Incredible. Superstar producer Warryn Campbell [...] once again works his magic. These sisters rock." Cross Rhythms editor Tony Cummings felt that "with their second project Erica and Tina Campbell cover just about every musical base – banging hip hop beats, black church rave ups, soulful ballads and funky R&B grooves while their lyrics are never less than uplifting."

== Chart performance ==
Incredible debuted and peaked at number 20 on the US Billboard 200, selling 43,000 copies in its first week. The album also entered the top ten of the Top R&B/Hip-Hop Albums and topped the Top Gospel Albums chart. While Incredible charted higher than its predecessor Thankful (2000), it sold significantly less. It was eventually certified gold by the Recording Industry Association of America (RIAA), indicating sales in excess of 500,000 copies.

In response to the albums sales Tina Campbell elaborated in a 2005 interview: "The business of music has changed drastically since the first record. There have been huge mergers, the advent of Napster [at the time a music piracy utility], and downsizing of labels. Our second record came in the midst of all of that. When we were performing, people asked when we'd release our second album, even though it had already been out for six weeks. So I definitely think it may not have gotten the push the first one got."

== Track listing ==
No.	Title	Writer(s)	Producer(s)	Length
1.	"Incredible"	Erica Atkins-Campbell; Trecina Atkins-Campbell; Warryn Campbell	W. Campbell	4:00
2.	"God Bless"	John Smith; W. Campbell; E. Atkins-Campbell; T. Atkins-Campbell	W. Campbell	3:28
3.	"He Said" (featuring Rodney Jerkins)	Jerkins; LaShawn Daniels; Norman Gregg; Nora Payne	Jerkins	4:25
4.	"In the Morning"	Joi Campbell; W. Campbell; E. Atkins-Campbell; T. Atkins-Campbell	W. Campbell	4:15
5.	"Ordinary People"	C. Bereal; K. Bereal; E. Atkins-Campbell; T. Atkins-Campbell	Charlie Bereal; Kenny Bereal	3:47
6.	"Trouble Ain't"	Smith; W. Campbell; E. Atkins-Campbell; T. Atkins-Campbell	W. Campbell	4:10
7.	"Little Girl"	Smith; W. Campbell; E. Atkins-Campbell; T. Atkins-Campbell	W. Campbell	2:48
8.	"This Love" (featuring Fred Hammond)	Kim Rutherford; Hammond; W. Campbell; E. Atkins-Campbell; T. Atkins-Campbell	W. Campbell	4:09
9.	"I Try"	W. Campbell; E. Atkins-Campbell; T. Atkins-Campbell	W. Campbell	4:26
10.	"Hold On"	W. Campbell; E. Atkins-Campbell; T. Atkins-Campbell; Fred Santacruz	W. Campbell	3:22
11.	"God Has Smiled On Me"	Isaiah Jones, Jr.	W. Campbell	3:05
12.	"You Will Know"	Stevie Wonder	W. Campbell	5:33
13.	"So Close"	W. Campbell; E. Atkins-Campbell; T. Atkins-Campbell	W. Campbell	3:59
14.	"Thank You" (featuring Walter Hawkins & The Love Christian Center Choir)	Walter Hawkins	W. Campbell	7:00
15.	"Give It Up, Let It Go"	Michael Flowers	Mike City	4:02
16.	"Happy"	Smith; W. Campbell; E. Atkins-Campbell; T. Atkins-Campbell	W. Campbell	3:01
17.	"I Luv Him"	W. Campbell; E. Atkins-Campbell; T. Atkins-Campbell	W. Campbell	4:14
Total length:				68:59

Incredible — Japanese edition (bonus tracks)
No.	Title	Writer(s)	Producer(s)	Length
16.	"Happy"	Smith; W. Campbell; E. Atkins-Campbell; T. Atkins-Campbell	W. Campbell	3:01
17.	"If I Fall"	W. Campbell; E. Atkins-Campbell; T. Atkins-Campbell	W. Campbell	3:49
18.	"In the Morning (Baby Dubb Remix #1)"	J. Campbell; W. Campbell; E. Atkins-Campbell; T. Atkins-Campbell	W. Campbell	4:01

Incredible — Circuit City edition (bonus track)
No.	Title	Writer(s)	Producer(s)	Length
21.	"Thank You (Nyrraw Remix)" (featuring Kirk Franklin)	Hawkins	Franklin; W. Campbell	4:34

== Charts ==
=== Weekly charts ===
Chart (2002)	Peak position
US Billboard 200	20
US Top Christian Albums (Billboard)	1
US Top Gospel Albums (Billboard)	1
US Top R&B/Hip-Hop Albums (Billboard)	10

=== Year-end charts ===
Chart (2002)	Peak position
US Christian Albums (Billboard)	13
US Top Gospel Albums (Billboard)	3
Chart (2003)	Peak position
US Christian Albums (Billboard)	29
US Top Gospel Albums (Billboard)	6

=== Decade-end charts ===
Chart (2000–2009)	Peak position
US Top Gospel Albums (Billboard)	10

== Certifications ==
Region	Certification	Certified units/sales
United States (RIAA)	Gold	500,000^{^}
^{^} Shipments figures based on certification alone.
