= Mary Mary =

American gospel duo

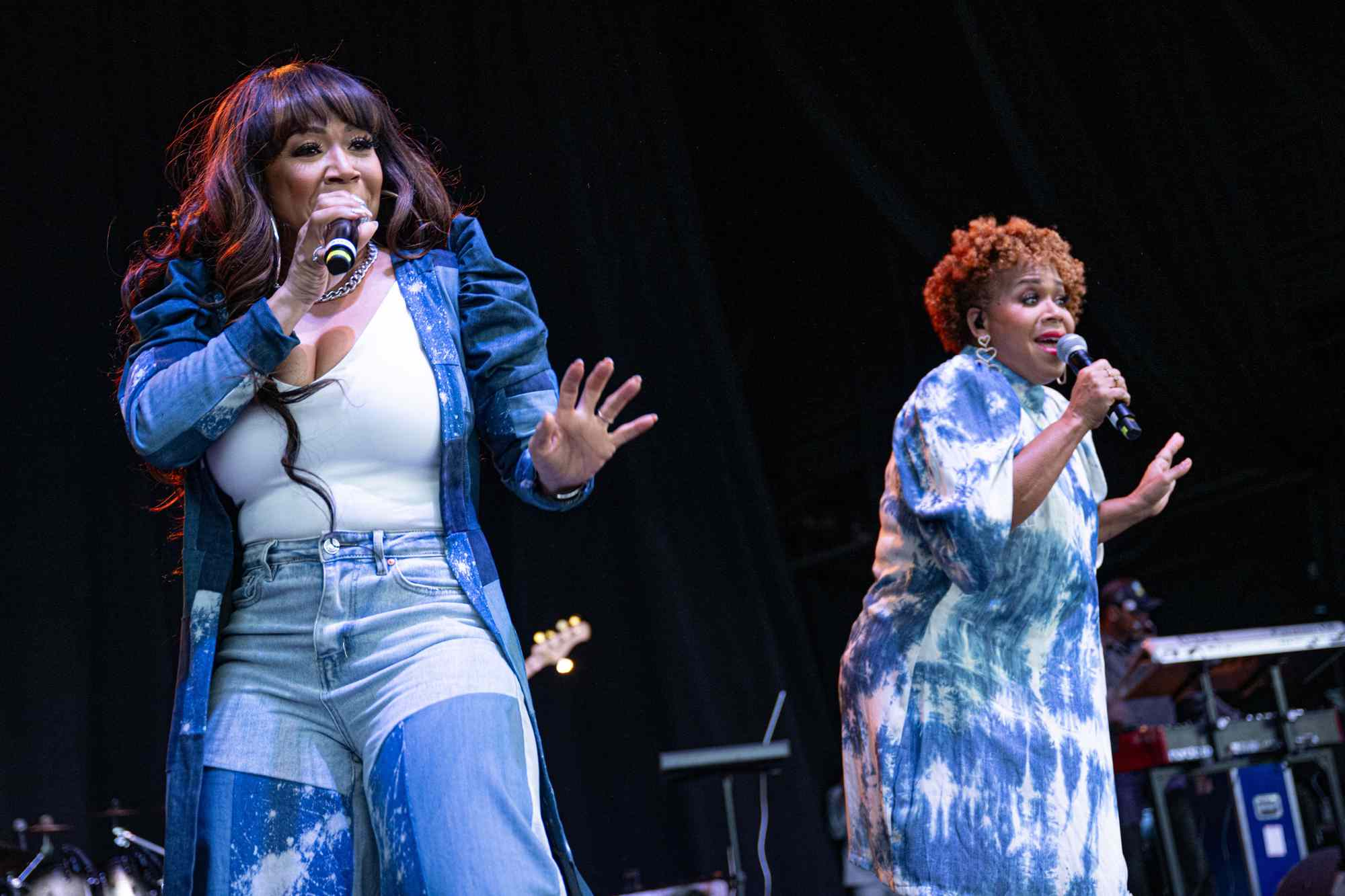
- Erica and Tina performing in 2023

Background information
- Origin: Inglewood, California, U.S.
- Genres: CCM; R&B; hip-hop; gospel
- Works: Discography
- Years active: 1998–2012; 2017–2018; 2021—present
- Labels: Columbia; EMI
- Members: Erica Atkins-Campbell; Tina Atkins-Campbell
- Website: ilovemarymary.com

Mary Mary is an American female gospel music duo formed in Inglewood, California, in 1998. The members are composed of sisters Erica Atkins-Campbell and Tina Atkins-Campbell.

Mary Mary first performed in local churches and gospel competitions in California and later as backup singers for several R&B acts. After signing to Columbia Records in 1999, they released their debut album Thankful (2000), which sold over two million copies in the United States and also earned a Grammy Award for Best Contemporary R&B Gospel Album at the 43rd Annual Grammy Awards (2001). The album spawned the international chart-topping single "Shackles (Praise You)". They released two studio albums between 2002 and 2005, including the successful albums Incredible (2002) and Mary Mary (2005) and singles "In the Morning" (2002), "Heaven" (2005), and "Yesterday" (2005). After releasing the Christmas album A Mary Mary Christmas (2006), they served as judges on the television singing competition series Sunday Best (2007–2011).

After a brief hiatus, Mary Mary released their fifth album The Sound (2008), which produced the US Gospel top-three singles "Get Up" and "God in Me", with the latter peaking atop of the chart. In 2012, Mary Mary went on hiatus to pursue solo careers, following the release of their compilation album Go Get It. They also starred in their own reality television series on We TV titled Mary Mary (2012–2017), which followed their solo careers and personal lives.

Mary Mary is one of the best-selling gospel music acts of all time, with estimated sales of over 8 million records. They have received many accolades, including four Grammy Awards, seventeen Stellar Awards, seven GMA Dove Awards, and two American Music Awards. In 2025, they were inducted into the Missouri Gospel Music Hall of Fame.

== History ==
=== 1992–1999: Formation and early years ===
In 1992, Erica Atkins appeared in the musical comedy Sister Act 2: Back in the Habit as a member of an opposing choir in the gospel competition. Erica and Tina Atkins eventually enrolled in El Camino College, where they studied classical singing and music. In 1995, Erica and Tina left college and toured with Michael Matthews' traveling gospel shows, Momma I'm Sorry and Sneaky. During the tour, they met music producer Warryn Campbell who was traveling as the show's bassist. Through Campbell, the duo established a publishing deal with EMI Music Publishing in 1998.

In June 1998, they debuted as Mary Mary, a group name inspired by two biblical figures: Mary, mother of Jesus, and Mary Magdalene, releasing their first single "Dance", which featured American singer Robin S on the soundtrack of fantasy comedy film Dr. Dolittle. They also wrote "What More Can He Do" for 702's self-titled second album (1999), "Time to Change" and "Yeah" for Yolanda Adams' album Mountain High... Valley Low (1999). In the same year, they toured as backup singers for Brian McKnight, Brandy Norwood, Eric Benét, Terry Ellis, and Kenny Lattimore.

=== 2000–2003: Thankful and commercial breakthrough ===
On February 29, 2000, Mary Mary released their single, titled "Shackles (Praise You)". The song became their first major hit, peaking at number 28 on the Billboard Hot 100, and within the top ten of the charts in Australia and New Zealand, and several European countries, including Denmark, Norway, the Netherlands, and the United Kingdom. "Shackles (Praise You)" preceded their debut studio album, Thankful, which was released on May 2, 2000, on Columbia Records. The album featured a mixture of gospel songs and urban hip-hop music produced by Warryn Campbell. Thankful peaked at number fifty-nine on the Billboard 200 and atop the Top Gospel Albums chart for seven weeks. The album also sold over 350,000 copies in the United States within its first month of release. The album's second single, "I Sings" failed to replicate the success of "Shackles".

Thankful went on to sell over two million copies in the US, earning a two-time platinum certification from the Recording Industry Association of America (RIAA). The album also won a Grammy Award for Best Contemporary R&B Gospel Album at the 43rd Annual Grammy Awards (2001). At the 16th Annual Stellar Awards in 2001, Mary Mary won several accolades including New Artist of the Year and Group/Duo of the Year.

In July 2002, they released their second album, Incredible, which sold 43,000 copies in its first week. While less successful than its predecessor in sales, the album charted higher than Thankful, peaking at number twenty on the Billboard 200 and topping the Top Gospel Albums chart for thirteen weeks. The lead single "In the Morning" peaked at number fifty-four on the Billboard R&B chart. In January 2003, Mary Mary embarked on a concert tour with Fred Hammond. In September 2003, they appeared in the music comedy film The Fighting Temptations. In November 2003, they released their autobiography Transparent on Taylor Trade Publishing.

=== 2005–2011: Mary Mary, My Block Records, and subsequent releases ===
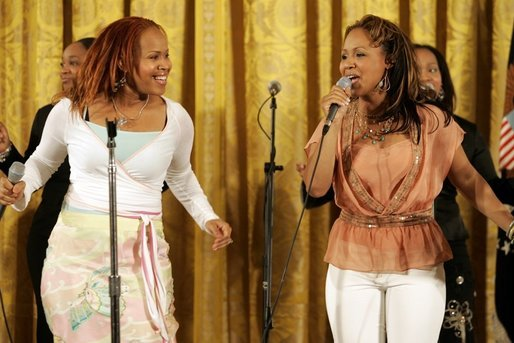
Mary Mary performing in 2005 at the White House during a Black Music Month celebration

By 2005, Mary Mary had joined label imprint My Block Records, an independent record label formed by Erica Atkins' husband Warryn Campbell under Sony Music Entertainment. Their self-titled third album was released on July 19, 2005, on My Block Records and Columbia Records with 57,000 copies sold that week. The album debuted atop of Billboard Top Gospel Albums chart as well as the Top Christian Albums chart and held the top position on those charts for six weeks. Four singles were issued from the album: the lead single "Heaven", followed by "The Real Party", "Yesterday", and "Believer"; the first single hit peaked atop of the newly established US Billboard Hot Gospel Songs chart and held the top position for fifteen weeks while "Yesterday" peaked at number three on the Billboard Hot Gospel Songs chart. By December 2005, Mary Mary was certified gold in the United States by the RIAA. The album was nominated for Best Contemporary Soul Gospel Album while "Heaven" was nominated for Best Gospel Song at the 48th Annual Grammy Awards in 2006.

In February 2006, Mary Mary performed at the Super Bowl Gospel Celebration. On October 10, 2006, the group released the holiday album A Mary Mary Christmas, featuring both versions of several traditional Christmas songs as well as original songs. A televised Christmas concert special titled Mary Mary Christmas aired on the Gospel Music Channel. On October 2, 2007, BET aired the American singing competition television series Sunday Best, which Mary Mary served as judges alongside BeBe Winans. With the exception of Erica not participating in season three, they remained on the panel of judges until season five where they replaced with CeCe Winans.

"Get Up" was released on July 15, 2008, as the lead single of their fifth album The Sound. It topped the Billboard Dance Club Songs chart, becoming Mary Mary's first number-one on that chart. In the US, The Sound was released on October 21, 2008, to positive reviews. It debuted at number seven on the Billboard 200, making it their highest debut on the chart, with 37,000 copies sold in the first week. The Sound also debuted atop of the Billboard Top Gospel Albums chart and held the top positive for thirty-two weeks, making it their longest-running number-one on the chart. The album's third single, "God in Me", spent seven weeks atop of the Billboard Hot Gospel Songs chart and also became their second song to top the Dance Club Songs chart. The album garnered four Grammy Award nominations, with "Get Up" winning a Grammy Award for Best Gospel/Contemporary Christian Music Performance (2009) and "God in Me" winning a Grammy Award for Best Gospel Song (2010).

In April 2010, they released their second book entitled, Be U: Be Honest, Be Beautiful, Be Intentional, Be Strong, Be You! on Simon & Schuster. Mary Mary released their sixth album Something Big on March 29, 2011. Something Big peaked at number ten on the US Billboard 200 and number two on the Top Gospel Albums chart. The lead single, "Walking", preceded the album's release by four months and peaked at number three on the Billboard Hot Gospel Songs chart. "Survive", the second single from the album, peaked at number thirteen on the chart.

=== 2012–present: Disbandment and aftermath ===
On March 29, 2012, Mary Mary premiered their self-titled reality television series on WE TV. The series ran for six seasons, chronicling their careers and personal lives. In May 2012, they released a compilation album Go Get It, which spawned the title-track as the lead single. To promote the album, Mary Mary launched their Go Get It Tour. During their reality show, Mary Mary announced that they would be pursuing solo careers.

Erica Campbell's debut solo album, Help, was a commercially successful album. Released in 2014, it debuted at number six on the Billboard 200 and produced the US top-ten gospel singles "A Little More Jesus" and "Help". Help earned Erica a Grammy Award for Best Gospel Album at the 57th Annual Grammy Awards (2015). A year later, she reissued her album titled Help 2.0 (2015). The album's single, "I Luh God", topped the US Hot Gospel Songs chart. In May 2015, Tina Campbell released her debut solo album, It's Personal, which debuted at number one on the Top Gospel Albums chart. The album coincided with the release of her memoir I Need a Day to Pray. "Destiny", the album's lead single, peaked at number one on the US Digital Gospel chart. She also released a reissue of her first album retitled It's Still Personal, which produced the US top twenty gospel singles "Too Hard Not To" and "We Livin'".

In 2018, Mary Mary reunited for the 2018 Stellar Awards and performed a medley of their hits. In 2022, Mary Mary performed "Lift Every Voice and Sing" at Super Bowl LVI. Mary Mary also performed at a special Easter Verzuz, competing against gospel duo BeBe & CeCe Winans.

== Artistry ==
=== Musical style and themes ===
Mary Mary primarily recorded gospel material, with works that incorporated elements of R&B, dance pop, EDM, blues, and hip hop. In an 2000 interview with Ebony magazine, Erica stated: "We sing a combination of urban hip-hop and gospel. We are very much a part of the hip-hop culture, but, at the same time, gospel is a very important part of our lives." The group have explored themes of like empowerment in songs such as "Get Up" and "Go Get It", but have also been criticized for songs like "God in Me".

Mary Mary have cited The Clark Sisters, Shirley Caesar, The Winans, Aretha Franklin, and Stevie Wonder as some of their key influences. They also pull inspiration from other contemporary artists to attract a wider audience. In 2000, Erica said: "We try to take from everybody. Not just gospel artists, but rock, country and R&B.; I think Shania Twain is great, and Eminem and Dr. Dre write the catchiest hooks. We’re not gonna change our beliefs, but we want mass appeal, and that encompasses a whole lot." Music critic David Jeffries of AllMusic described them as "Blessed with wonderful voices, poignant songwriting skills, and a keen eye for which producers to work with, Mary Mary are a triple-threat who have delivered one exciting album after another." Andy Kellman, writing for the same publication, referred to their style as "instantly memorable, upbeat, radio-ready material that places them at the forefront of contemporary gospel."

=== Public image ===
Mary Mary's image has been described as "edgy fashion". Their younger sister and celebrity fashion stylist Thomasina "Goo Goo" Atkins has described their style as fashionable yet comfortable while referring to Tina as more "conservative". Their fashion image has often been criticized in the media for being "too secular or worldly" for gospel singers. In 2014, Erica Campbell was met with controversy when she revealed the initial album cover of her debut solo album Help prior to its release. Campbell was depicted in a white form-fitted dress which led the public to view the album cover as sexual. She later replaced the photo with a close-up image for the album cover.

== Legacy and recognition ==
Mary Mary has sold more than 8 million records worldwide, making them one of best-selling gospel music acts of all time. They are credited with expanding the reach of urban contemporary gospel in the 2000s by blending elements of soul, hip-hop, funk, and jazz.

Mary Mary won four Grammy Awards, seventeen Stellar Awards, seven GMA Dove Awards, and two American Music Awards. In 2025, they were inducted into the Missouri Gospel Music Hall of Fame.

== Discography ==
- Thankful (2000)
- Incredible (2002)
- Mary Mary (2005)
- A Mary Mary Christmas (2006)
- The Sound (2008)
- Something Big (2011)
- Go Get It (2012)

== Published works ==
- Transparent (2003)
- Be U: Be Honest, Be Beautiful, Be Intentional, Be Strong, Be You! (2010)
