= The Sound (Mary Mary album) =

Studio album by Mary Mary
- Released: October 21, 2008
- Genres: Contemporary Christian music, gospel
- Length: 45:01
- Label: Columbia
- Producer: Warryn Campbell

Mary Mary chronology
A Mary Mary Christmas (2006)	The Sound (2008)	Something Big (2011)

Singles from The Sound
- 1. "Get Up" Released: July 15, 2008; 2. "I Worship You" Released: August 2008; 3. "God In Me" Released: November 2008; 4. "Seattle" Released: December 2009

The Sound is the fifth studio album by American duo Mary Mary. It was released on October 21, 2008, by Columbia Records. A concept album suggesting an FM radio broadcast experience, the project was produced by Warryn Campbell.

In advance of the album's release, the duo released a promotional song entitled "A Mother's Smile" in conjunction with a Mother's Day promotion with Colgate. The official lead single "Get Up" was released on July 15, 2008, and won Best Gospel/Contemporary Christian Music Performance at the 2009 51st Grammy Awards. The album was also nominated for a Dove Award for Contemporary Gospel Album of the Year at the 40th GMA Dove Awards.

== Production ==
As with other Mary Mary recordings, Warryn Campbell assumed production over the album. The duo covers a range of musical genres, including a Marvin Winans gospel song, "It Will All Be Worth It", and a nod to crunk with "Superfriend". They bring a Motown flavor with "The Sound", and an urban street sound to the third single "God in Me", featuring Kierra Sheard. Finally, the duo also incorporated dance-pop music in their lead single "Get Up". The album's title track appeared on the soundtrack to the 2008 biographic film Cadillac Records. The entire album is recorded to give the listener the illusion of listening to a radio station. The Sound employs inter-track drops and frequent station IDs (WMBR/MyBlock Radio).

== Critical reception ==
Professional ratings
Review scores
Source	Rating
Allmusic	4/5 stars
Cross Rhythms	10/10 stars
SoulTracks	favorable

Andy Kellman from AllMusic gave The Sound a four out of five stars rating. He found that "once again, it's the instantly memorable, upbeat, radio-ready material that places Mary Mary at the forefront of contemporary gospel [...] There's more walloping vigor than what can be found in nearly any given modern, platinum-seeking R&B album. The disc's latter half is relatively indistinct, but it could never be said that the duo is going through the motions." Cross Rhythms editor Dave Brassington wrote that "far more focussed than previous projects, and with occasionally breathtaking production this shows Tina and Erica at their finest [...] Clearly the sisters taking it up to the next level has been recognised by the public as this is their most successful album of the five they've recorded and wherever you look." Chris Rizik from SoulTracks wrote that "what's surprising about their newest disc, The Sound, is how Mary Mary can sound so new – and maybe even better – five records into their career."

=== Accolades ===
In December 2008, The Sound was Grammy Award-nominated for the 51st Grammy Awards of 2009 in the category "Best Gospel Album". The album's first single "Get Up" also received two Grammy nominations for "Best Gospel Song" and "Best Gospel Performance," of which it won "Best Gospel Performance." At the 52nd Grammy Awards in 2010 the duo won another Grammy for Best Gospel Song for God In Me. The album was also nominated for a Dove Award for Contemporary Gospel Album of the Year at the 40th GMA Dove Awards. The song "Get Up" was also nominated for Country Recorded Song of the Year.

== Chart performance ==
The Sound debuted at number seven on the US Billboard 200, selling 37,800 copies it first week. This marked Mary Mary's highest-charting album to date. In addition, it peaked at number two on the Billboard Top R&B/Hip Hop Albums chart, as well as number 1 on both the Top Gospel Albums and Top Christian Albums. The Sound has remained on the Billboard 200 for 55 weeks.

== Singles ==
Leading single, "Get Up", was released digitally on July 15, 2008. The song peaked at number 30 on the Hot R&B/Hip-Hop Songs, number two on the Hot Gospel Songs and topped the Hot Dance Club Play chart. A music video for Mary Mary's next single "I Worship You" was released through several online channels in August 2008.

An additional single, "God In Me", featuring singer Kierra Sheard gained airplay on both hip-hop and R&B formats. According to a bulletin post on Sheard's official MySpace page, an internet contest to appear in the music video for "God In Me" was announced in December 2008. It peaked at number 68 on the US Billboard Hot 100, number five on the Hot R&B/Hip-Hop Songs and again, topped the Top Gospel Songs chart. It became the first song since their debut single "Shackles (Praise You)" to chart on the Billboard Hot 100. "God In Me" reached the top ten of the Hot R&B/Hip-Hop Songs in its 42nd week, the longest climb to the top tier in the survey's 67-year history. It spent 76 weeks on the Hot R&B/Hip-Hop Songs.

== Track listing ==
All tracks are written by Warryn Campbell, Erica Campbell and Tina Campbell, unless otherwise noted.

No.	Title	Writer(s)	Length
1.	"Intro" (featuring Deborah Joy Imani Winans)		0:46
2.	"The Sound"		3:26
3.	"Get Up"	Warryn Campbell; Erica Campbell; Tina Campbell; Eric Dawkins	3:08
4.	"Superfriend" (featuring David Banner)	Warryn Campbell; Erica Campbell; Tina Campbell; David Banner	3:49
5.	"God in Me" (featuring Kierra "Kiki" Sheard)		3:10
6.	"Boom"		3:41
7.	"I'm Running"		3:08
8.	"Forgiven Me"		4:34
9.	"Dirt"		4:20
10.	"Seattle"	Warryn Campbell; Erica Campbell; Tina Campbell; Juan Winans; Marvin Winans	4:11
11.	"I Worship You"		5:53
12.	"It Will All Be Worth It" (with Andrae Crouch, Daryl Coley, Tramaine Hawkins, Walter Hawkins, Dorinda Clark-Cole, Joe Ligon, Karen Clark Sheard, and Rance Allen)	Warryn Campbell; Marvin Winans	4:48
Total length:			45:01

== Charts ==
=== Weekly charts ===
Chart (2008)	Peak position
US Billboard 200	7
US Top Christian Albums (Billboard)	1
US Top Gospel Albums (Billboard)	1
US Top R&B/Hip-Hop Albums (Billboard)	2

=== Year-end charts ===
Chart (2008)	Position
US Christian Albums (Billboard)	24
US Top Gospel Albums (Billboard)	9
Chart (2009)	Position
US Billboard 200	111
US Christian Albums (Billboard)	2
US Top Gospel Albums (Billboard)	1
US Top R&B/Hip-Hop Albums (Billboard)	33
Chart (2010)	Position
US Christian Albums (Billboard)	32
US Top Gospel Albums (Billboard)	10
US Top R&B/Hip-Hop Albums (Billboard)	88

== Release history ==
List of release dates, showing region, and label
Region	Date	Label
United States	September 30, 2008 (Exclusive digital release via Rhapsody.com)	Columbia; Sony
United Kingdom	October 20, 2008	Columbia; Sony
United States	October 21, 2008	Columbia; Sony
Europe	October 21, 2008	Integrity Europe; Provident
