= Something Big (Mary Mary album) =

Studio album by Mary Mary
- Released: March 29, 2011
- Recorded: 2010
- Genre: Religious
- Length: 43:56
- Label: Columbia
- Producers: Warryn Campbell (also exec.); Mary Mary (exec.); LaMar "Mars" Edwards; Gerald Haddon; Jazz Nixon

Mary Mary chronology
The Sound (2008)	Something Big (2011)	Go Get It (2012)

Singles from Something Big
- 1. "Walking" Released: December 7, 2010; 2. "Survive" Released: May 2011

Something Big is the sixth and final studio album by American duo Mary Mary. It was released on March 29, 2011 by Columbia Records. Originally set to be released on December 14, 2010 under the title OMG, it was not released until 2011. Something Big was primarily written by Mary Mary and produced by Warryn Campbell, along with Jazz Nixon, Gerald Haddon and LaMar "Mars" Edwards.

== Critical reception ==
Professional ratings
Review scores
Source	Rating
AllMusic	3/5 stars
Christianity Today	8/10 stars
Jesus Freak Hideout	4/5 stars
Pop Matters	6/10 stars

Something Big received generally positive reviews from critics. Andy Kellman of Allmusic praised the title and opening track "Something Big" for being "a raucous stomper" and its follow-up "Something Bigger" which he notes "increases the energy with super-charged marching-band percussion". Andrea Dawn Goforth of Christianity Today also reviewed the album's opening favourably, with its "exciting march-like drum beat and hooky Timbaland-esque male vocal". Goforth also highlighted the "infectious beats, sweet harmonies, and creative arrangements" on the album while Kellman lent praise to the group's "striking harmonies" on the rich folk-soul gospel that is "Homecoming Glory". Likewise, Josh Langhoff of Pop Matters praised the duo's voices, describing them as "wonderful", writing that they "sing clearly and richly, moving from solo lines to well-arranged harmonies" and that "every note seems perfectly calculated to deliver as much pleasure as possible". However, he noted that if there’s any fault in the music on this album, it’s that vocals and production seem overly-planned and non-outlandish throughout" going on to hail the album as "solid" but on the contrary "frustrating", writing that "it hints at an audacity that its lyrics and music never quite deliver". Similarly Kellman reviewed the "album's second half" less positively than the first, writing that its "relatively dry songs lack the edge of the album’s first half" and so it "sags with plaintively strummed acoustic guitars and churning electric guitars". Kevin Hoskins of Jesus Freak Hideout gave a much more favourable review however, rating the album four out of five stars and describing it as being "much better and more diverse than expected". Hoskins listed "Something Big", "Something Bigger", "Walking", "Homecoming Glory", "Catch Me" and "Sitting With Me" - which was described by Langhoff as "a lovely lilting number" - as particular standouts.

== Commercial performance ==
The album debuted at number ten on the US Billboard 200 chart, with first-week sales of 42,000 copies in the United States.

== Singles ==
The lead single, "Walking", was released digitally on December 7, 2010. The song garnered massive airplay mainly on the urban, urban adult contemporary, rhythmic, gospel and the dance radio formats. In the United States, it had peaked at number 3 on the Hot Gospel Songs, number 94 on the Billboard Hot 100, number 14 on the Hot R&B/Hip-Hop Songs, number 5 on the Hot Dance Club Play, and number 57 on the Radio Songs. "Walking" also peaked at number 77 on the Japan Hot 100 and number 43 on the South Korea International chart. The song's video was directed by Luga Podesta, best known for shooting recent pop videos for Travie McCoy, Emily Osment and Hey Monday and premiered in late January 2011. The second single, "Survive" has peaked at number 51 on the Hot R&B/Hip-Hop Songs.

== Track listing ==
No.	Title	Writer(s)	Producer(s)	Length
1.	"Something Big"	Tina Campbell; Erica Campbell; Danny Nixon; Alphonzo Mizell; Berry Gordy; Deke Richards; Freddie Perren	Nixon; Warryn Campbell; T. Campbell^{[a]}	3:51
2.	"Something Bigger"	E. Campbell; T. Campbell; W. Campbell	W. Campbell	3:17
3.	"Blind"	Antea Shelton; Anesha Birchett; W. Campbell	W. Campbell	3:34
4.	"It Is Well"	E. Campbell; T. Campbell; W. Campbell; Tammi Haddon	W. Campbell	4:00
5.	"Never Wave My Flag"	E. Campbell; T. Campbell; W. Campbell; Matthew Edwards; Juan Winans	W. Campbell; Edwards^{[b]}	3:49
6.	"Walking"	E. Campbell; T. Campbell; W. Campbell; Neal Conway; Crystal Waters	W. Campbell	3:20
7.	"Slow Walk"	E. Campbell; T. Campbell; W. Campbell	W. Campbell	1:47
8.	"Survive"	Gerald Haddon; Asaleana Elliott; Derrick "Swol" Ray; Aaron Sledge; Chris Johnson	Haddon; W. Campbell	3:39
9.	"Are You Ready"	E. Campbell; T. Campbell; W. Campbell	W. Campbell	3:25
10.	"Catch Me"	Winans; Justin Gray	W. Campbell; Edwards	3:51
11.	"Sitting with Me"	E. Campbell; T. Campbell; T. Haddon; Gerald Haddon	Haddon; W. Campbell	3:47
12.	"Homecoming Glory"	Alvin Love	W. Campbell	5:24
Total length:				43:56

Notes

- ^{^[a]} denotes vocal producer
- ^{^[b]} denotes co-producer

Sample credits

- "Something Big" contains a sample from "Mama's Pearl", performed by The Jackson 5.
- "It Is Well" contains re-sung lyrics from "It Is Well with My Soul", written by Horatio Spafford & Philip Bliss.
- "Survive" contains replayed bass sample from "Never Can Say Goodbye" performed by The Jackson 5.

== Personnel ==
- Mary Mary - Executive Producers
- Warryn Campbell - Executive Producer
- Quincy Jackson - Marketing

== Charts ==
=== Weekly charts ===
Chart (2011)	Peak position
US Billboard 200	10
US Top Gospel Albums (Billboard)	2
US Top R&B/Hip-Hop Albums (Billboard)	6

=== Year-end charts ===
Chart (2011)	Position
US Top Gospel Albums (Billboard)	3
US Top R&B/Hip-Hop Albums (Billboard)	47
Chart (2012)	Position
US Top Gospel Albums (Billboard)	29

=== Decade-end charts ===
Chart (2010–2021)	Peak position
US Top Gospel Albums (Billboard)	43

== Release history ==
Something Big release history
Region	Date	Label	Ref(s)
United States	March 29, 2011	Columbia; Sony	
United Kingdom	March 29, 2011	Columbia; Sony	
