= Shackles (Praise You) =

2000 single by Mary Mary

Single by Mary Mary

from the album Thankful
- Released: February 29, 2000
- Genre: Urban gospel; R&B
- Length: 3:16
- Label: C2; Columbia
- Songwriters: Erica Atkins; Trecina Atkins; Warryn Campbell; Franne Golde; Dennis Lambert; Duane Hitchings
- Producer: Warryn Campbell

Mary Mary singles chronology
"Shackles (Praise You)" (2000)	"I Sings" (2000)

Alternate cover
- The 2000 re-release that was used for promotion of Thankful

"Shackles (Praise You)" is a song by American gospel singer-songwriter duo Mary Mary from their first album, Thankful. Released February 29, 2000, as the duo's debut single, it is one of the best-selling gospel songs of all time. Stan North of GospelFlava.com deemed it one of the pioneer songs of urban gospel music. "Shackles" became a top-10 hit in several countries, including Australia, Denmark, Iceland, New Zealand, Norway and the United Kingdom, and charted well in other major music markets. Mary Mary later produced a music video for the song.

== Critical reception ==
Like many contemporary gospel songs, "Shackles" was not without its criticism; many cited the song as being too modern and not staying true to its gospel roots. Mary Mary responded by saying, "It's definitely contemporary. It's music that everybody in any style of music can relate to. It's universal, but the lyrics are undeniably Gospel."

== Commercial performance ==
"Shackles (Praise You)" became a top-40 hit in the United States, peaking at number 28 on the Billboard Hot 100 chart. The song was also a worldwide hit, reaching number five on the UK singles chart and number 17 on the Irish Singles Chart. Across mainland Europe, the song was a top-10 hit in Belgium, the Netherlands and Norway. It also charted strongly in France, Poland, Sweden and Switzerland, peaking within the top 20. In Australia, the song reached number two in September 2000 and was the highest-selling song of the year that did not reach the number-one spot, coming in at number 10 on Australia's year-end chart for 2000.

== Usage in media ==
The song has been used twice as a "lip sync for your life" on RuPaul's Drag Race. In the 2009 sixth episode of season one, "The Absolut Ball", Rebecca Glasscock defeated Shannel in a lip sync of Shackles, and in 2021 tenth episode of season 13, "Freaky Friday Queens", Olivia Lux defeated Denali in a lip sync of the same song.

The song was featured in "Breakup", the 2024 fifth episode of the third season of American sitcom Abbott Elementary, performed by Barbara Howard (Sheryl Lee Ralph).

== Track listings ==
=== United States ===
CD single

1. "Shackles (Praise You)" (album version) – 3:18
2. "What a Friend" (snippet) – 1:03
3. "Be Happy" (snippet) – 1:42
4. "Thankful" (snippet) – 1:11
5. "Wade in the Water" (snippet) – 1:39

Maxi-CD single

1. "Shackles (Praise You)" (single version) – 3:18
2. "Shackles (Praise You)" (Maurice's radio mix) – 3:45
3. "Shackles (Praise You)" (Maurice's Carnival 2000 mix) – 8:55
4. "Shackles (Praise You)" (Maurice's Carnival 2000 mix instrumental) – 8:55
5. "Shackles (Praise You)" (Maurice's New Year's Eve dub mix) – 7:15
6. "Shackles (Praise You)" (MO-apella) – 2:46

12-inch single

A1. "Shackles (Praise You)" (Maurice's Carnival 2000 mix) – 8:55
A2. "Shackles (Praise You)" (Maurice's New Year's Eve dub mix) – 7:15
B1. "Shackles (Praise You)" (Maurice's Carnival 2000 mix instrumental) – 8:55
B2. "Shackles (Praise You)" (MO-apella) – 2:46
B3. "Shackles (Praise You)" (single version) – 3:18

Cassette single

A1. "Shackles (Praise You)" (album version) – 3:18
B1. "What a Friend" (snippet) – 1:03
B2. "Be Happy" (snippet) – 1:42
B3. "Thankful" (snippet) – 1:11
B4. "Wade in the Water" (snippet) – 1:39
B5. "Shackles (Praise You)" (MO-apella) – 2:46

=== International ===
Australian CD single

1. "Shackles (Praise You)" (album version) – 3:18
2. "Shackles (Praise You)" (Maurice's radio mix) – 3:45
3. "Shackles (Praise You)" (Maurice's Carnival 2000 mix) – 8:55
4. "Shackles (Praise You)" (Maurice's Carnival 2000 mix instrumental) – 8:55
5. "Shackles (Praise You)" (Maurice's New Year's Eve dub mix) – 7:15
6. "Shackles (Praise You)" (MO-apella) – 2:46

European CD1

1. "Shackles (Praise You)" (album version) – 3:18
2. "Shackles (Praise You)" (Maurice's radio mix) – 3:45

European CD2

1. "Shackles (Praise You)" (album version) – 3:18
2. "Shackles (Praise You)" (Maurice's radio mix) – 3:45
3. "I Got It" – 3:52
4. "Shackles (Praise You)" (Maurice's Carnival 2000 mix) – 8:55

UK CD1

1. "Shackles (Praise You)" – 3:18
2. "Shackles (Praise You)" (Hil St. Soul mix) – 3:33
3. "Shackles (Praise You)" (2K mix by Tariq) – 3:08
4. "Shackles (Praise You)" (The Top Notch remix) – 2:50

UK CD2

1. "Shackles (Praise You)" – 3:18
2. "Shackles (Praise You)" (Maurice's radio mix) – 3:45
3. "Shackles (Praise You)" (Maurice's Carnival 2000 mix) – 8:55

UK cassette single

1. "Shackles (Praise You)" – 3:18
2. "Shackles (Praise You)" (Maurice's Carnival 2000 mix) – 8:55

== Personnel ==
- Vocals: Mary Mary
- All instruments: Warryn "Baby Dubb" Campbell
- Producer: Warryn Campbell
- Vocal producer: Mary Mary
- Writers: Warryn Campbell, Erica Atkins, Tina Atkins

== Charts ==
=== Weekly charts ===
Weekly chart performance for "Shackles (Praise You)"
Chart (2000)	Peak position
Australia (ARIA)	2
Australian Dance (ARIA)	2
Australian Urban (ARIA)	1
Belgium (Ultratop 50 Flanders)	6
Belgium (Ultratop 50 Wallonia)	8
Czech Republic (IFPI)	24
Denmark (IFPI)	4
Europe (Eurochart Hot 100)	11
France (SNEP)	13
Germany (GfK)	25
Hungary (Mahasz)	2
Iceland (Íslenski Listinn Topp 40)	8
Ireland (IRMA)	17
Italy (FIMI)	22
Italy Airplay (Music & Media)	7
Netherlands (Dutch Top 40)	4
Netherlands (Single Top 100)	4
New Zealand (Recorded Music NZ)	8
Norway (VG-lista)	5
Poland Airplay (Music & Media)	2
Romania (Romanian Top 100)	12
Scottish Singles Sales (Official Charts)	15
Sweden (Sverigetopplistan)	11
Switzerland (Schweizer Hitparade)	14
UK Singles (Official Charts)	5
UK Hip Hop/R&B (Official Charts)	1
US Billboard Hot 100	28
US Dance Club Songs (Billboard)	19
US Dance Singles Sales (Billboard)	9
US Hot R&B/Hip-Hop Songs (Billboard)	9
US Rhythmic Airplay (Billboard)	25

=== Year-end charts ===
Year-end chart performance for "Shackles (Praise You)"
Chart (2000)	Position
Australia (ARIA)	10
Belgium (Ultratop 50 Flanders)	51
Belgium (Ultratop 50 Wallonia)	27
Brazil (Crowley)	86
Europe (Eurochart Hot 100)	40
France (SNEP)	40
Iceland (Íslenski Listinn Topp 40)	45
Ireland (IRMA)	89
Netherlands (Dutch Top 40)	6
Netherlands (Single Top 100)	24
New Zealand (RIANZ)	17
Romania (Romanian Top 100)	100
Switzerland (Schweizer Hitparade)	51
UK Singles (OCC)	48
UK Urban (Music Week)	1
US Billboard Hot 100	100
US Hot R&B/Hip-Hop Singles & Tracks (Billboard)	32
US Maxi-Singles Sales (Billboard)	28
US Rhythmic Top 40 (Billboard)	100

== Certifications ==
Certifications for "Shackles (Praise You)"
Region	Certification	Certified units/sales
Australia (ARIA)	Platinum	70,000^{^}
Belgium (BRMA)	Gold	25,000^{*}
Denmark (IFPI Danmark)	Gold	45,000^{‡}
France (SNEP)	Silver	125,000^{*}
New Zealand (RMNZ)	2× Platinum	60,000^{‡}
Sweden (GLF)	Gold	15,000^{^}
United Kingdom (BPI)	Platinum	600,000^{‡}
United States (RIAA)	Platinum	1,000,000^{‡}
^{*} Sales figures based on certification alone.^{^} Shipments figures based on certification alone.^{‡} Sales+streaming figures based on certification alone.

== Release history ==
Release dates and formats for "Shackles (Praise You)"
Region	Date	Format(s)	Label(s)	Ref(s).
United States	February 29, 2000	Rhythmic contemporary; urban; urban AC radio	Columbia	
United States	March 7, 2000	CD; cassette	Columbia	
United States	April 18, 2000	Contemporary hit radio	Columbia	
New Zealand	May 22, 2000	CD; cassette	Columbia	
Japan	May 24, 2000	CD	Sony	
United Kingdom	May 29, 2000	CD; cassette	Columbia	
