= Mary Mary (album) =

Studio album by Mary Mary
- Released: July 19, 2005
- Genres: Urban contemporary gospel; R&B
- Length: 42:14
- Label: Columbia
- Producers: Warryn Campbell (also exec.); Charlie Bereal; Kenny Bereal; Steve "Stone" Huff; Jazz Nixon; Nisan Stewart; Dontae Winslow

Mary Mary chronology
Incredible (2002)	Mary Mary (2005)	A Mary Mary Christmas (2006)

Mary Mary is the third studio album by American duo Mary Mary. It was released by Columbia Records on July 19, 2005 in the United States, selling 57,000 copies in its first week. In 2006, the album won a Dove Award for Contemporary Gospel Album of the Year at the 37th GMA Dove Awards.

The album was listed among the 52 CD releases from Sony BMG that were identified as having been shipped with the controversial Extended Copy Protection (XCP) computer software, which has been known to cause a number of serious security problems in any Microsoft Windows computer that had the CD inserted at one time and has been regarded as a trojan horse, spyware, or rootkit by a number of security software vendors. Sony discontinued use of the technology on November 11, 2005, and recalled this and other titles affected by XCP, and asked customers to submit copies affected by the software to the company so that it could replace them with copies that did not contain the software.

== Critical reception ==
Professional ratings
Review scores
Source	Rating
AllMusic	4/5 stars
Christianity Today	4.5/5 stars
Cross Rhythms	9/10 stars

David Jeffries from AllMusic gave the self-titled album a four out of five stars rating. He wrote that "blessed with wonderful voices, poignant songwriting skills, and a keen eye for which producers to work with, Mary Mary are a triple-threat who have delivered one exciting album after another. Raising the contemporary gospel bar once again, Mary Mary deserves your attention." Cross Rhythms writer Mike Rimmer found that "the girls are back with their best album yet. Always blessed with strong songwriting and vocal talents, they've refused to compromise the message and this release is packed with excellent stuff and a few surprises."

== Track listing ==
No.	Title	Writer(s)	Producer(s)	Length
1.	"Believer"	Erica Campbell; Trecina Campbell; Warryn Campbell	W. Campbell	4:11
2.	"Biggest, Greatest Thing"	David Delhomme; Dontae Winslow; W. Campbell	Winslow; W. Campbell	1:56
3.	"Heaven"	E. Campbell; T. Campbell; Joi Campbell; W. Campbell	Campbell	3:45
4.	"The Real Party (Trevon's Birthday)"	E. Campbell; T. Campbell; W. Campbell	W. Campbell	4:05
5.	"Save Me" (featuring Baby Dubb)	E. Campbell; T. Campbell; W. Campbell; Nisan Stewart	Stewart; W. Campbell	3:13
6.	"Yesterday"	E. Campbell; T. Campbell; W. Campbell	W. Campbell	5:20
7.	"What Is This"	Joann Rosario; Steve Huff	Huff; W. Campbbell	4:00
8.	"Love You That Much"	E. Campbell; T. Campbell; Charles Bereal; Kenneth Bereal; W. Campbell	C. Bereal; K. Bereal; W. Campbell	4:01
9.	"Stand Still"	E. Campbell; T. Campbell; Danny Nixon	Jazz "The Man" Nixon	3:45
10.	"And I" (featuring Kirk Franklin)	E. Campbell; T. Campbell; W. Campbell	W. Campbell	3:51
11.	"Speak to Me"	E. Campbell; T. Campbell; W. Campbell	W. Campbell	4:07
Total length:				42:14

Samples

- "Heaven" contains excerpts from "Want Ads"/"We Belong Together" by Honey Cone.
- "Save Me" contains excerpts from the composition "Save Me Now".

== Charts ==
=== Weekly charts ===
Chart (2005)	Peak position
US Billboard 200	8
US Top Christian Albums (Billboard)	1
US Top Gospel Albums (Billboard)	1
US Top R&B/Hip-Hop Albums (Billboard)	4

=== Year-end charts ===
Chart (2005)	Position
US Christian Albums (Billboard)	9
US Top Gospel Albums (Billboard)	3
US Top R&B/Hip-Hop Albums (Billboard)	81
Chart (2006)	Position
US Christian Albums (Billboard)	8
US Top Gospel Albums (Billboard)	3
US Top R&B/Hip-Hop Albums (Billboard)	68
Chart (2007)	Position
US Christian Albums (Billboard)	37
US Top Gospel Albums (Billboard)	14
Chart (2017)	Position
US Top Gospel Albums (Billboard)	45

=== Decade-end charts ===
Chart (2000–2009)	Peak position
US Top Gospel Albums (Billboard)	8

== Certifications ==
Region	Certification	Certified units/sales
United States (RIAA)	Gold	500,000^{^}
^{^} Shipments figures based on certification alone.
