= Warryn Campbell =

American record producer (born 1975)

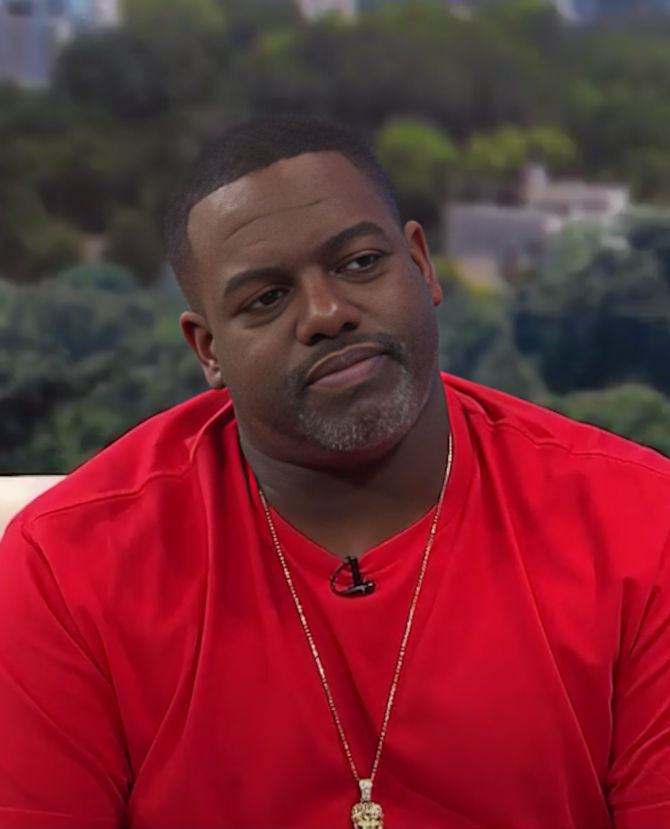
- Campbell in 2019

Background information
- Also known as: Smiley; Baby Dubb
- Born: Warryn Stafford Campbell Jr. August 21, 1975 (age 51)
- Origin: Los Angeles, California, U.S.
- Genres: Hip-hop soul; gospel; R&B; pop
- Occupations: Record producer; songwriter; pastor; actor
- Label: My Block
- Member of: The Soul Seekers
- Spouse: Erica Atkins (m. 2001)

Warryn Stafford Campbell Jr. (born August 21, 1975) is an American record producer and songwriter. Known for his work in the hip-hop soul and gospel genres, Campbell originally got his start as a session musician under the wing of DJ Quik — playing piano on his third album, Safe + Sound (1995). Campbell has won five Grammy Awards, having been credited on releases by Kanye West, Alicia Keys, Mary Mary, and Yolanda Adams, among others.

== Career ==
His work includes production and songwriting credits for Mary Mary, Kanye West, Alicia Keys, Xzibit, Yolanda Adams, Mos Def, Missy Elliott, Kierra Sheard, Brandy, Dave Hollister, Men of Standard, Mario, Kelly Price, Shanice, Dru Hill, Dorinda Clark-Cole, Musiq Soulchild, and more. He is also a member of the modern quartet-styled traditional gospel group The Soul Seekers signed to GospoCentric Records. As a record executive, he briefly served as vice president of A&R for Elektra Records.

He appears in the 2019 movie Strive as "The Pastor", and also composed the music for the film.

Warryn Campbell is currently the Pastor of California Worship Center of San Fernando, CA.

== Personal life ==
Campbell is the son of Warryn and Sandra Campbell. His younger sister is singer-songwriter Joi Campbell. On May 26, 2001, he married Erica Atkins of the gospel/R&B duo Mary Mary. Their eldest daughter, Krista Nicole Campbell, was born on September 13, 2004. On April 24, 2010, the couple's second child, Warryn Campbell III, was born. On July 19, 2011, Erica announced on Good Morning America that she was pregnant with their third child. She gave birth early to a girl, Zaya Monique Campbell, on January 24, 2012.

Campbell was diagnosed with kidney cancer in 2008 and had an emergency operation to remove one kidney.

== Awards and nominations ==
=== Grammy Awards ===
The Grammy Awards are awarded annually by the National Academy of Recording Arts and Sciences.

| Year | Nominee / work | Award | Result |
|---|---|---|---|
| 2000 | Mountain High... Valley Low (Yolanda Adams's album) (as producer) | Best Contemporary R&B Gospel Album | Won |
| 2001 | Thankful (Mary Mary's album) (as producer) | Best Contemporary R&B Gospel Album | Won |
| 2002 | Songs in A Minor (Alicia Keys's album) (as producer) | Best R&B Album | Won |
| 2003 | Full Moon (Brandy's album) (as producer) | Best Contemporary R&B Album | Nominated |
| 2005 | Afrodisiac (Brandy's album) (as producer) | Best Contemporary R&B Album | Nominated |
| 2005 | It's About Time (Christina Milian's album) (as producer) | Best Contemporary R&B Album | Nominated |
| 2006 | Late Registration (Kanye West's album) (as producer) | Album of the Year | Nominated |
| 2006 | Late Registration (Kanye West's album) (as producer) | Best Rap Album | Won |
| 2006 | The Cookbook (Missy Elliott's album) (as producer) | Best Rap Album | Nominated |
| 2006 | Turning Point (Mario's album) (as producer) | Best Contemporary R&B Album | Nominated |
| 2006 | Mary Mary (Mary Mary's album) (as producer) | Best Contemporary R&B Gospel Album | Nominated |
| 2006 | "Heaven" (Mary Mary) | Best Gospel Song | Nominated |
| 2007 | Unpredictable (Jamie Foxx's album) (as producer) | Best R&B Album | Nominated |
| 2008 | Graduation (Kanye West's album) (as producer) | Album of the Year | Nominated |
| 2008 | Graduation (Kanye West's album) (as producer) | Best Rap Album | Won |
| 2008 | Luvanmusiq (Musiq Soulchild's album) (as producer) | Best R&B Album | Nominated |
| 2009 | The Sound (Mary Mary's album) (as producer) | Best Contemporary R&B Gospel Album | Nominated |
| 2009 | Jennifer Hudson (Jennifer Hudson's album) (as producer) | Best R&B Album | Won |
| 2009 | "Get Up" | Best Gospel/Contemporary Christian Music Performance | Won |
| 2009 | "Get Up" | Best Gospel Song | Nominated |
| 2010 | "God In Me" | Best Gospel Song | Won |
| 2013 | "Go Get It" | Best Gospel Song | Won |
| 2013 | Write Me Back (R. Kelly's album) (as producer) | Best R&B Album | Nominated |
| 2018 | "Too Hard Not To" (Tina Campbell song) (as writer) | Best Gospel Performance/Song | Nominated |
| 2018 | "My Life" (Walls Group Song) (as writer) | Best Gospel Performance/Song | Nominated |
| 2022 | Donda (Kanye West album) (as writer and producer) | Album of the Year | Nominated |
| 2022 | Donda (Kanye West album) (as writer and producer) | Best Rap Album | Nominated |
