= Emmalyn (singer) =

Canadian singer (born 1992)

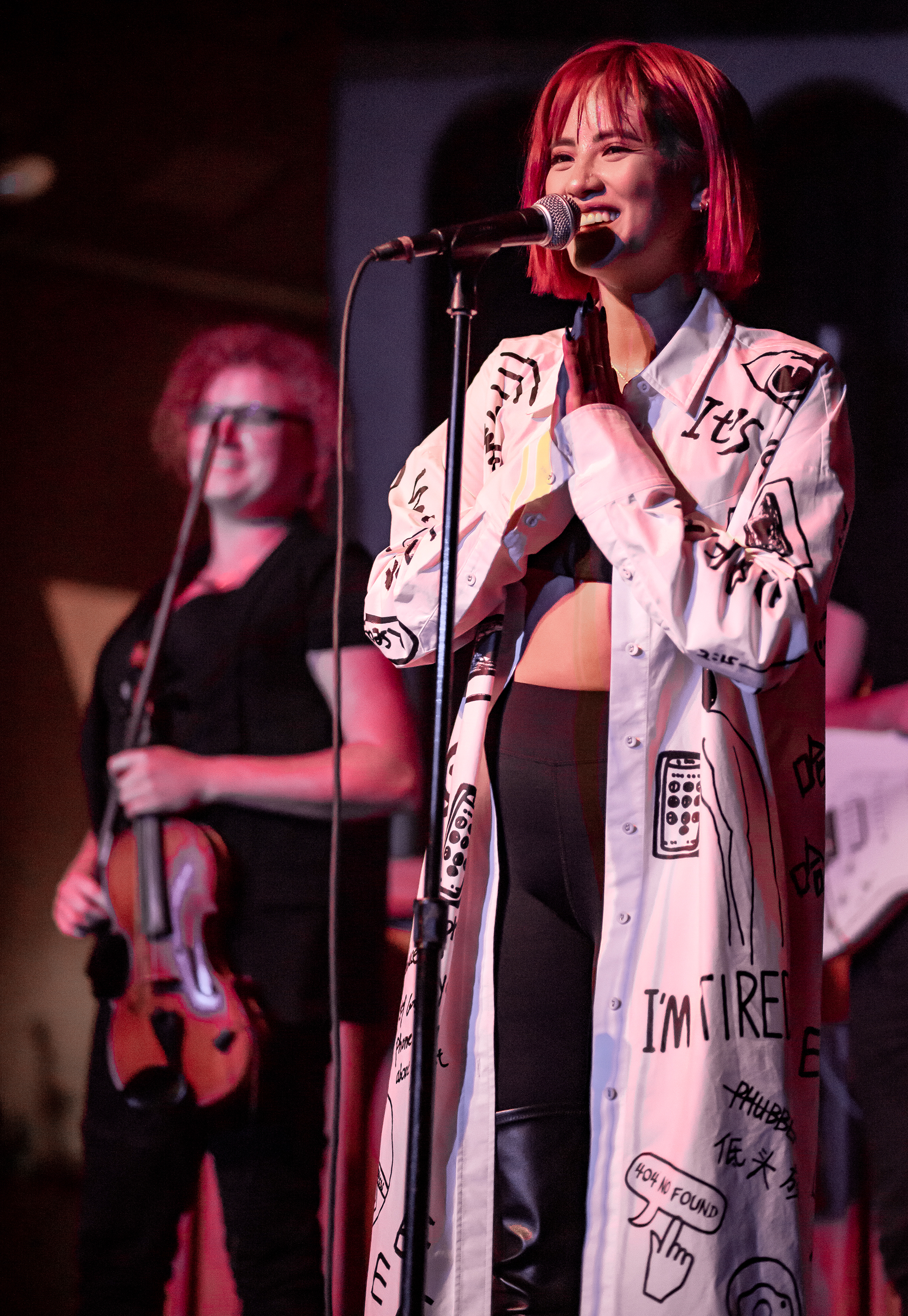
- Emmalyn performing at the Peppermint Club in September 2018

Background information
- Born: Emmalyn Estrada; April 5, 1992 (age 34)
- Origin: Surrey, British Columbia, Canada
- Genres: Pop; R&B; dance
- Occupations: Singer; songwriter; dancer
- Years active: 2009–present
- Labels: RCA; Kemosabe
- Member of: G.R.L.
- Website: emmalyn.com

Emmalyn Estrada (born April 5, 1992), known mononymously as Emmalyn, is a Canadian singer. Her first single, "Get Down", entered Billboard's Canadian Hot 100 chart for the week of August 29, 2009, at number 88 and peaked at number 59 for the week of October 31, 2009. She is best known as a member of the girl group G.R.L., formed by Robin Antin.

== Personal life ==
Emmalyn is the youngest in her family and attended Holy Cross Regional High School in Surrey, British Columbia. She is of Filipino descent. In October 2009, Emmalyn decided to move to Los Angeles, California. In June 2011, Emmalyn moved back to her hometown of Surrey, British Columbia. She is the younger sister of Elise Estrada. She gave birth to a baby girl in May 2022.

== Career ==
=== 2009–2010: Career beginnings ===
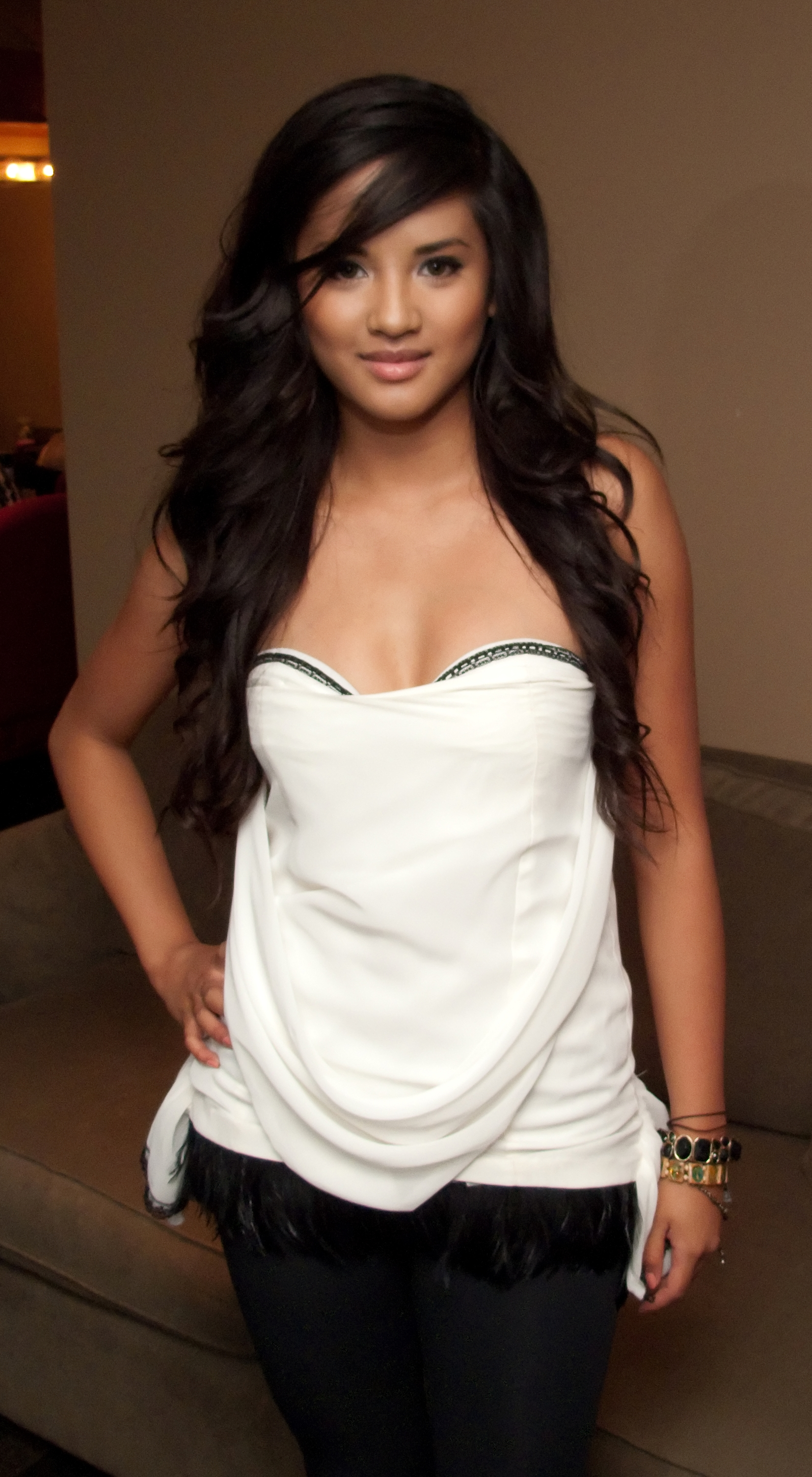
Estrada in 2009

In May 2009, Estrada competed in the 2009 Beat Music Awards hosted by Vancouver's The Beat 94.5. Estrada won the competition Her single, "Get Down" debuted on July 2, 2009, on the Kid Carson Show, again on The Beat 94.5. The single was nominated in the Dance/Urban/Rhythmic category of the 13th annual Canadian Radio Music Awards, which recognizes new songs that secured the most airplay on Canadian radio stations as recorded by Nielsen Broadcast Data Systems.

In May 2009, Emmalyn released her first single "Get Down" with RockSTAR Music Corp after winning The 2009 Beat Music Awards. Emmalyn is not signed to RockSTAR Music Corp after winning The 2009 Beat Music Awards.

On November 29, 2010, Emmalyn's first music video for her first single "Don't Make Me Let You Go" premiered on her YouTube account. This is her first music video with her new record label TUG (The Ultimate Group) Music Entertainment.

=== 2013–2015: Rise to fame and G.R.L. ===
In March 2013, Estrada had a recurring role in the popular A&E television series Bates Motel.

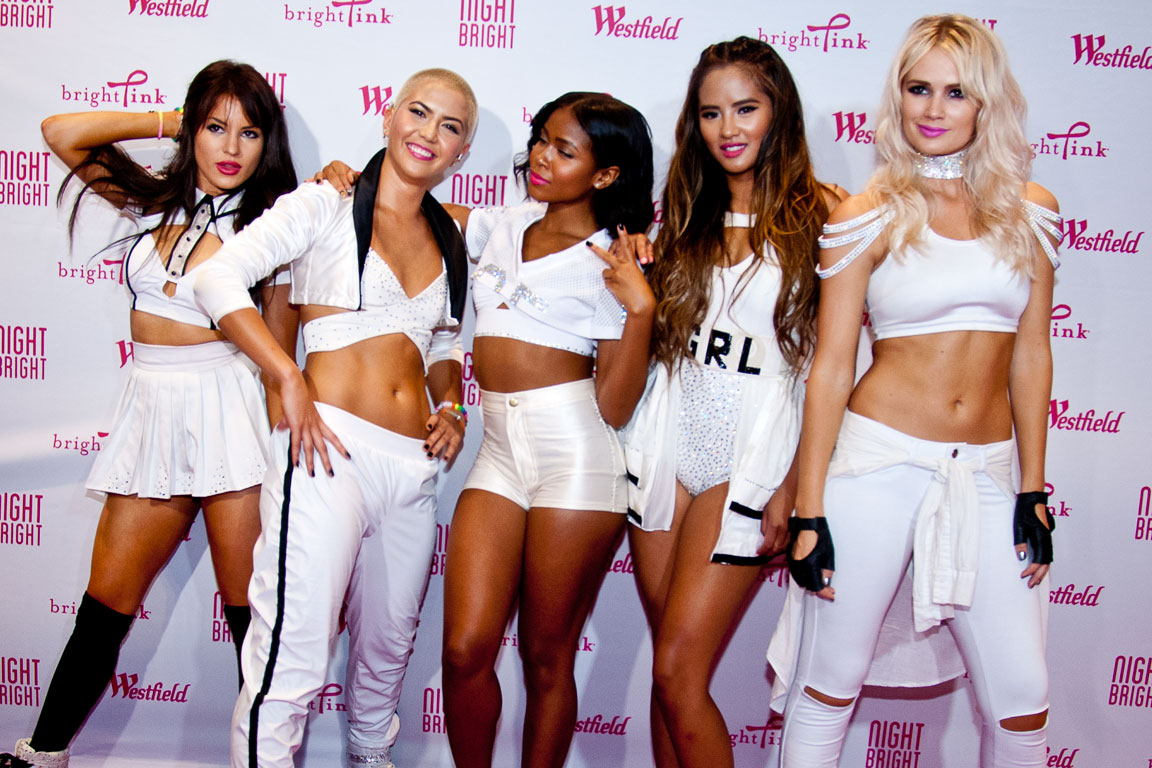
Estrada with G.R.L. bandmates in September 2013

She was a member of the girl group G.R.L. alongside Lauren Bennett, Natasha Slayton, Paula van Oppen and Simone Battle from 2013 to 2015, which delivered the hits "Vacation" from The Smurfs 2, "Wild Wild Love" with Pitbull, "Ugly Heart", and "Lighthouse" dedicated to group-mate Simone Battle, who died by suicide in September 2014.

=== 2016–2019: Solo career ===
On July 13, 2016, Estrada released "#FreeTitties", her first solo record since departing G.R.L. On September 28, 2016, Estrada released her follow up single "Hungover", which was accompanied by a music video released on October 4.

Eight months after the release of "Hungover", Estrada released "Phone Off" on May 5, 2017. "Bigger Than You", her next single, shortly followed and released on June 2, 2017. Estrada performed at Galore's first ever Girl Cult Festival on August 20, 2017, in Los Angeles.

== Discography ==
=== Extended plays ===
Title	Album details
0405	Released: April 5, 2019; Label: self-published; Formats: digital download, streaming

=== Singles ===
==== As lead artist ====
Year	Single	Album
2009	"Get Down"	Non-album singles
2010	"Don't Make Me Let You Go"	Non-album singles
2016	"#FreeTitties"	Non-album singles
2016	"Hungover"	Non-album singles
2017	"Phone Off"	Non-album singles
2017	"Bigger Than You"	Non-album singles
2017	"Self Care"	Non-album singles
2018	"Feels Like"	0405
2018	"These Hands"	0405

=== Other releases ===
==== As featured artist ====
Year	Single	Album
2013	"Into the Unknown" (with Da Hool)	Non-album single
2018	"Technique" (with Paces, Jeida Woods)	ZAG
2018	"Void" (with Sj, Zookëper)	Calabasas
2019	"Switch" (with Afrojack, Jewelz & Sparks)	Switch (Remixes)

== Filmography ==
=== Film ===
Year	Title	Role	Notes
2012	The Wishing Tree	Juliet Espinoza	
2013	Forever 16	Trisha	

=== Television ===
Year	Title	Role	Notes
2013	Bates Motel	Hayden	Season 1; 4 episodes

== Awards and nominations ==
Year	Award	Nomination	Work	Result	Ref.
2010	Canadian Radio Music Awards	Dance/Rhythmic/Urban Song	"Get Down"	Nominated	
