= Simone Battle =

American singer (1989–2014)

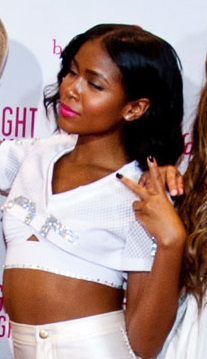
- Battle in 2013

Background information
- Born: Simone Sherise Battle; June 17, 1989; Los Angeles, California, U.S.
- Died: September 5, 2014 (aged 25) Los Angeles, California, U.S.
- Cause of death: Suicide by hanging
- Genres: Pop; R&B
- Occupations: Singer; dancer; actress
- Years active: 2006–2014
- Labels: Kemosabe; RCA
- Formerly of: G.R.L.

Simone Sherise Battle (June 17, 1989 – September 5, 2014) was an American singer, dancer and actress. Beginning her career after appearing in the American series Zoey 101 and Everybody Hates Chris, she also starred in several music videos and in the film We the Party (2012) alongside Snoop Dogg. Battle garnered attention after auditioning for the American version of The X Factor in 2011, and was eliminated at the first live show.

In 2012, she joined the original line up for American girl group G.R.L., and the group rose to prominence in 2014 for their single "Wild Wild Love", with American rapper and singer Pitbull. The song reached the top ten in Australia, Belgium, Norway, United Kingdom and became their first chart entry on the US Billboard Hot 100. In June 2014, "Ugly Heart" was released to critical acclaim and became the group's second consecutive hit and reached the top ten in Ireland, Scotland, Sweden, and Australia.

Three months after the success of "Ugly Heart", Battle died by suicide at the age of 25, after struggling with depression. Following her death, the group dedicated their single "Lighthouse" to her.

== Career ==
=== 2006–2011: Career beginnings and The X Factor ===
Battle made her television debut in 2006, having small roles on shows including Zoey 101 and Everybody Hates Chris. In 2008, Battle was featured as the main character in the Mary Mary music video "Get Up". Battle also appeared as a background dancer in the Cali Swag District music video "Teach Me How to Dougie" in 2010.

In 2011, Battle auditioned for the American singing competition The X Factor in front of judges Simon Cowell, Paula Abdul, Cheryl and L.A. Reid. Battle sang "When I Grow Up" by The Pussycat Dolls. After receiving three yeses from the judges, Battle had made it through to Bootcamp. She was mentored by Cowell after becoming one of the top 32 contestants in the girls category. Battle chose to be part of the live shows with Melanie Amaro, Rachel Crow, Drew, and Tiah Tolliver. After making it to the top 17, Battle and Tolliver were eliminated from the girls category during the first week by Cowell. He had also noted Battle as being one of his favorite contestants that he has mentored. Battle's performances on The X Factor were:

Episode	Theme	Order	Song	Original artist	Result
Audition	Free choice	—N/a	"When I Grow Up"	The Pussycat Dolls	Through to bootcamp
Bootcamp 1	Group performance 1	—N/a	Not aired		Advanced
Bootcamp 2	Group performance 2	—N/a	Not aired		Advanced
Bootcamp 3	Solo performance	—N/a	"Your Song"	Elton John	Through to judges' houses
Judges' houses	No theme	—N/a	"Help!"	The Beatles	Through to live shows
Week 1	No theme	13	"Just Be Good to Me"	The S.O.S. Band	Eliminated

=== 2012–2014: Solo success, acting roles, and formation of G.R.L. ===
In 2012, Battle starred opposite Mandela Van Peebles, Moisés Arias, and Snoop Dogg in her film debut We the Party. The film received mixed to positive reviews from critics. We the Party was Battle's only full-length film. In 2012, Battle played Olivia in the short film Meanamorphosis. The film was released on April 27, 2012.

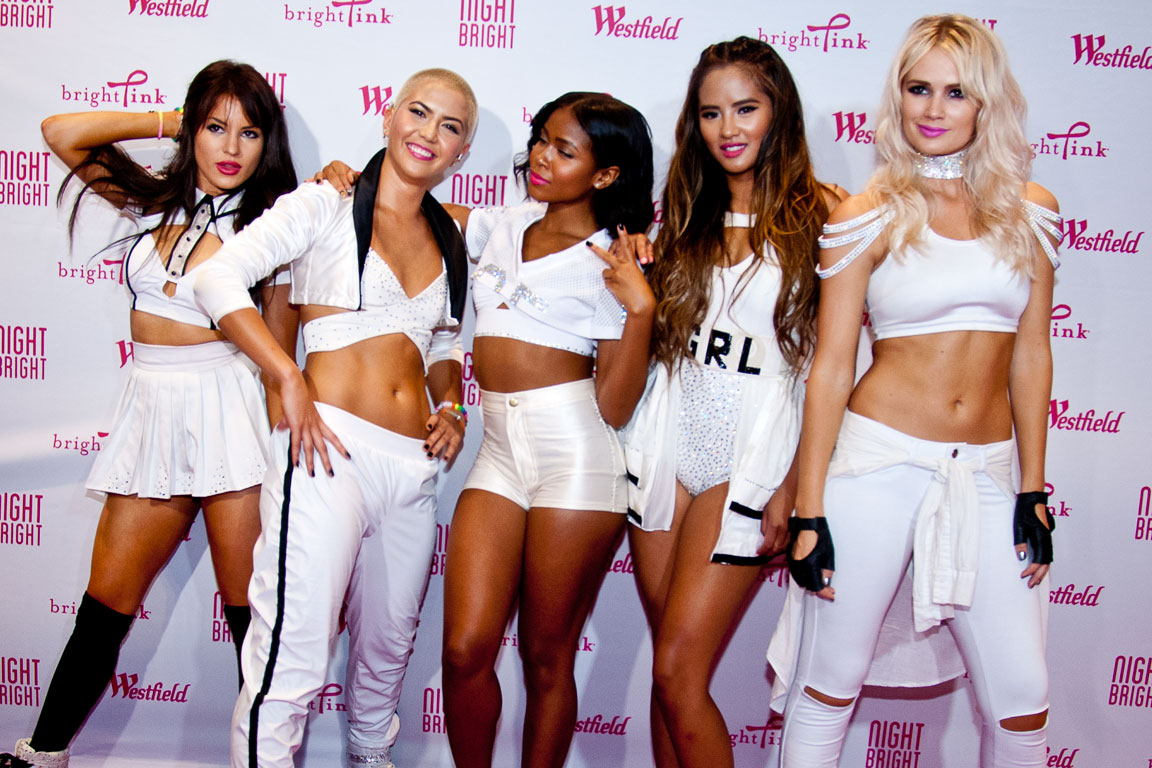
Battle with G.R.L. in 2013

Upon Steve Jones' announcement that she had been eliminated from the competition, Battle promoted the online release of her debut music video "He Likes Boys".

In August 2012, Battle was initially part of The Pussycat Dolls' proposed new lineup after their previous members disbanded in 2010. The announcement of her joining the group was made during the opening of the Pussycat Dolls Dollhouse at the Keating Hotel in San Diego, California. The Dolls' founder Robin Antin announced in February 2013 that they would continue instead as the "next generation" of the Dolls as a group called G.R.L..

== Death ==
Battle was found hanging in her bedroom closet on September 5, 2014, at the age of 25. The cause of death was ruled as suicide. A spokesperson for Battle stated that she suffered from depression due to financial issues. She was interred at Inglewood Park Cemetery.

=== Tributes ===
Simone's death led to a wide amount of media coverage and responses from fellow entertainers, co-workers, fans, and friends on social media. Many of Battle's co-workers and fellow entertainers including Robin Antin, Nicole Scherzinger, Simon Cowell, Pitbull, Cirkut, Dr. Luke, Mel B, Cheryl, and fellow G.R.L. members Natasha Slayton, Emmalyn Estrada and Lauren Bennett paid tribute to Battle by writing about her on their social media.

=== Musical tributes ===
Battle's band G.R.L. released the single "Lighthouse" as a tribute to Battle. The music video features clips and photos of Battle throughout her life.

== Discography ==
Battle released four singles and one music video as a solo artist and released one extended play, two singles (including one as a featured artist), two promotional singles, and three music videos with G.R.L.

=== Singles ===
Title	Year	Peak chart positions								Certifications	Album
Title	Year	US	AUS	IRE	NZ	KOR	CAN	FRA	UK	Certifications	Album
"Rain"	2008	—	—	—	—	—	—	—	—		Non-album singles
"Just a Boy"	2009	—	—	—	—	—	—	—	—		Non-album singles
"Material Girl"	2009	—	—	—	—	—	—	—	—		Non-album singles
"He Likes Boys"	2011	—	—	—	—	—	—	—	—		Non-album singles
"Vacation" (as of a member of G.R.L.)	2013	—	—	—	—	97	—	—	—		The Smurfs 2: Music from and Inspired By
"Show Me What You Got" (as of a member of G.R.L.)	2014	—	—	—	—	—	—	—	—		G.R.L.
"Wild Wild Love" (Pitbull featuring G.R.L.)	2014	30	10	30	25	—	22	90	6	ARIA: Platinum; MC: Platinum	Globalization
"Ugly Heart" (as of a member of G.R.L.)	2014	107	2	2	3	—	—	—	11	ARIA: 4× Platinum; BPI: Silver; RMNZ: Platinum	G.R.L.

=== Music videos ===
Song	Year	Director
"He Likes Boys"	2011	Shane McLafferty
"Vacation"	2013	Hannah Lux Davis
"Wild Wild Love"	2014	David Rousseau
"Ugly Heart"	2014	Chris Marrs Piliero

=== Covers ===
Year	Title
2008	"Like a Star"
2008	"Saving All My Love for You"
2010	"Tik Tok"
2010	"Speechless"
2010	"Teenage Dream"
2011	"Rolling in the Deep"
2011	"Someone Like You"
2011	"Santa Baby"
2012	"Take Care"
2012	"Starships"

== Filmography ==
=== Film ===
Year	Title	Role	Notes
2012	We the Party	Cheyenne Davis	Feature film debut; lead role
2012	Meanamorphosis	Olivia	Short film
2014	What We Need	Linda	Short film

=== Television ===
Year	Title	Role	Notes
2006	Everybody Hates Chris	Girl #2	Episode: "Everybody Hates Greg"
2006	Zoey 101	Girl	Episode: "Hot Dean"
2011	The X Factor	Candidate	Reality competition; 5 episodes
2012	106 & Park	Correspondent	

=== Music videos ===
Year	Song	Director	Album
2008	"Get Up"	Lenny Bass	The Sound
2010	"Teach Me How to Dougie"	Yolande Geralds	The Kickback
2010	"Text"	Kevin Shulman	Mann's World
