= Lauren Bennett =

English singer and dancer (1989–2026)

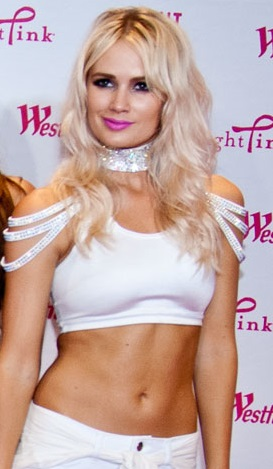
- Bennett in 2013

Background information
- Born: Lauren Diane Bennett; 23 June 1989; Meopham, Kent, England
- Died: 29 May 2026 (aged 36) Meopham, Kent, England
- Cause of death: Suicide by hanging
- Occupation: Singer
- Instrument: Vocals
- Years active: 2003–2026
- Formerly of: Paradiso Girls; G.R.L.

Lauren Diane Bennett-Wormald (23 June 1989 – 29 May 2026) was an English singer from Meopham, Kent. She was a member of Paradiso Girls, who were known for the song "Patron Tequila", and G.R.L., who were featured on Pitbull's "Wild Wild Love" and were known for their song "Ugly Heart". She was also featured on LMFAO's 2011 single "Party Rock Anthem", which peaked at number 1 in 20 countries including the US and the UK, becoming the second highest-selling single of the 2010s in the US.

== Biography ==
Lauren Diane Bennett-Wormald was born in Meopham, Kent, England, on 23 June 1989, and grew up in The Valley near Culverstone. She attended Meopham School and spent many years entering local talent contests and singing in pubs and bars from age 14 as half of a group. In 2006, she auditioned for TV singing contest The X Factor as part of the duo Fusion, who reached the show's bootcamp stage. Their appearance brought her to the attention of Robin Antin, who had previously founded The Pussycat Dolls. After moving to Los Angeles at the age of 17, she joined Antin's girl group Paradiso Girls, whose 2009 single "Patron Tequila" featured Lil Jon and Eve and reached number 3 on Billboard's Dance Club Songs chart and number 82 on the Canadian Hot 100. The group disbanded in 2010 after their second single, "Who's My Bitch", was unsuccessful.

Bennett featured on CeeLo Green's "Love Gun" from his album The Lady Killer in 2010 and on LMFAO's "Party Rock Anthem" in 2011. The latter peaked at number one in 20 countries including the US and the UK and became the former's second highest-selling single of the 2010s behind Mark Ronson and Bruno Mars's "Uptown Funk". She joined The Pussycat Dolls in November 2011 after helping Antin promote the fitness DVD "Robin Antin's Pussycat Dolls: Dancer's Body Workout"; she also released her debut solo single "I Wish I Wish" that year. The Pussycat Dolls changed its name to G.R.L. in early 2013, having spent a year swapping its members with Bennett, Paula Van Oppen, Natasha Slayton, Emmalyn Estrada, and Simone Battle; their debut song "Vacation" was featured on the soundtrack to The Smurfs 2.

In 2014, G.R.L. were featured on Pitbull's "Wild Wild Love" and released a self-titled EP, which included the single "Ugly Heart"; the former peaked at number 30 on the Billboard Hot 100 and at number 6 on the UK singles chart, while the latter peaked at number 2 in Australia, number 11 in the UK, in the top 5 in New Zealand, and in the top 20 in several other countries. A further single, January 2015's "Lighthouse", was released in tribute to Battle, who had died by suicide in September 2014 at the age of 25, and was released as part of their Gives an Hour mental health campaign. Battle's suicide led to the group's disbandment in June 2015, although Bennett and Slayton reformed G.R.L. with Jazzy Mejia in 2016 and released the singles "Are We Good" and "Kiss Myself".

Bennett featured on Nick Martin's "Reality" and released the single "Hurricane" in 2016; the latter was inspired by Battle's suicide and by watching her mother struggle with her mental health. She then featured on Nervo and Savi's "Forever or Nothing" and formed the folk, country, blues, and rock duo Bennett with her brother Ryan in 2017. She married her partner Kenny Wormald in 2019 and welcomed a daughter with him that September. G.R.L. toured until 2020, when Bennett and Slayton briefly reunited with Estrada and Van Oppen; Estrada remained into 2021. Bennett and Wormald opened a dance studio in Los Angeles before moving in with her father a few years after they married, by which time she had been diagnosed with Fragile X syndrome.

In January 2026, Bennett was hospitalised after not sleeping for several days. She was released after a week, but suffered a severe reaction to a prescription medication and continued to struggle with her mental health thereafter. She uploaded her final social media post in February 2026 – a cover of "These Boots Are Made for Walkin'" – and died in Meopham on 29 May 2026 at the age of 36. Her death was not widely reported until her former G.R.L. bandmates announced it on 6 July. Following the announcement, TMZ reported that her death was being investigated as a suicide and a coroner's inquest in October 2026 concluded that she had left handwritten suicide notes and hanged herself in woodland near Valley Lane, close to where she lived.

== Discography ==
=== Singles ===
==== As lead artist ====
List of singles as lead artist, with year released and album details shown
| Title | Year | Album |
|---|---|---|
| "I Wish I Wish" | 2011 | Non-album singles |
| "Hurricane" | 2016 | Non-album singles |

==== As featured artist ====
List of singles as lead artist, with selected chart positions and certifications, showing year released and album name
| Title | Year | Peak chart positions | | | | | | | | | | Certifications | Album |
| Title | Year | UK | AUS | AUT | CAN | FRA | GER | IRL | NZ | SWI | US | Certifications | Album |
|---|---|---|---|---|---|---|---|---|---|---|---|---|---|
| "Party Rock Anthem" (LMFAO featuring Lauren Bennett and GoonRock) | 2011 | 1 | 1 | 1 | 1 | 1 | 1 | 1 | 1 | 1 | 1 | BPI: 3× Platinum; ARIA: 15× Platinum; MC: 6× Platinum; RIAA: Diamond; RMNZ: 4× Platinum; SNEP: Platinum | Sorry for Party Rocking |
| "Reality" (Nick Martin featuring Lauren Bennett) | 2016 | — | — | — | — | — | — | — | — | — | — (Note: "Reality" did not enter the Billboard Hot 100, but did peak at number 21 on the Dance Club Chart.) | | Non-album singles |
| "Forever or Nothing" (Nervo and Savi featuring Lauren Bennett) | 2017 | — | — | — | — | — | — | — | — | — | — | | Non-album singles |
"—" denotes a recording that did not chart or was not released in that territory.

==== Guest appearances ====
List of non-single guest appearances, with year released and album details shown
| Title | Year | Album |
|---|---|---|
| "Love Gun" (CeeLo Green featuring Lauren Bennett) | 2010 | The Lady Killer (Platinum Edition) |
