= Vacation (G.R.L. song) =

Single by G.R.L.

from the album G.R.L.
- A-side: "Lighthouse"
- Released: June 18, 2013
- Genre: EDM; synth-pop; dance-pop
- Length: 3:38
- Label: Kemosabe; RCA
- Songwriters: Lukasz Gottwald; Max Martin; Bonnie McKee; Henry Walter
- Producers: Dr. Luke; Max Martin; Cirkut

G.R.L. singles chronology
"Vacation" (2013)	"Wild Wild Love" (2014)

Music video
- "Vacation" on YouTube

"Vacation" is the debut single recorded by American-British-Canadian girl group G.R.L. The song was written by Bonnie McKee, Lukasz Gottwald, Max Martin, and Henry Walter with production handled by the latter three. "Vacation" is an upbeat breakup song.

== Background and composition ==
Following the disbandment of The Pussycat Dolls in 2010, Robin Antin suggested that the group would be "revamped" with new members. After different incarnations of the group Antin along the guidance of manager Larry Rudolph formed the group under a new name, G.R.L. with members: Lauren Bennett, Paula Van Oppen, Natasha Slayton, Simone Battle, and Emmalyn Estrada. Bennett was the first cast as a member for group with members being added gradually over the next year and a half. The group was officially unveiled at Chateau Marmont in April. On June 16, "Vacation" temporarily bundled and available for free as a B-side to Britney Spears' "Ooh La La for the soundtrack of The Smurfs 2. The song was available for digital download on June 18, 2013 and was sent to mainstream radio on September 3, 2013.

== Reception ==
Jason Lipshutz of Billboard magazine described the song "bubbly." While reviewing the Smurfs 2 soundtrack, Sherman Yang of XIN MSN Entertainment positively reviewed the song describing it as "fun and flirty." He also praised the song for having multiple vocalists and wrote "we can't wait to hear what else the girls have to offer in their upcoming debut album." Popdust's Jacques Peterson gave it a mixed review calling it "insipid and forgettable" to Spears' "Ooh La La". In the United States as of July, the song has sold 2,000 copies, according to Nielsen SoundScan. Upon the release of "Ooh La La, "Vacation" debuted at number 97 on the South Korea Gaon International Chart.

== Music video ==
The music video for "Vacation" was directed by Hannah Lux Davis. Spice Girls member, Mel B appeared at the end of the video.

== Credits and personnel ==
Personnel

- Songwriting – Lukasz Gottwald, Max Martin, Bonnie McKee, Henry Walter
- Production, instruments and programming – Dr. Luke, Max Martin, Cirkut
- Engineering – Clint Gibbs, Sam Holland, Cory Bice (assistant), Rachael Findlen (assistant)
- Mixing – Serban Ghenea

Credits adapted from the liner notes of Ooh La La, Kemosabe Kids/RCA Records.

== Charts ==
Chart (2013)	Peak position
South Korea International (Gaon)	97

== Radio and release history ==
Country	Date	Format	Label
United States	June 18, 2013	Digital download	Kemosabe; RCA
United States	September 3, 2013	Contemporary hit radio	Kemosabe; RCA
