= Robin Antin =

American dancer (born 1961)

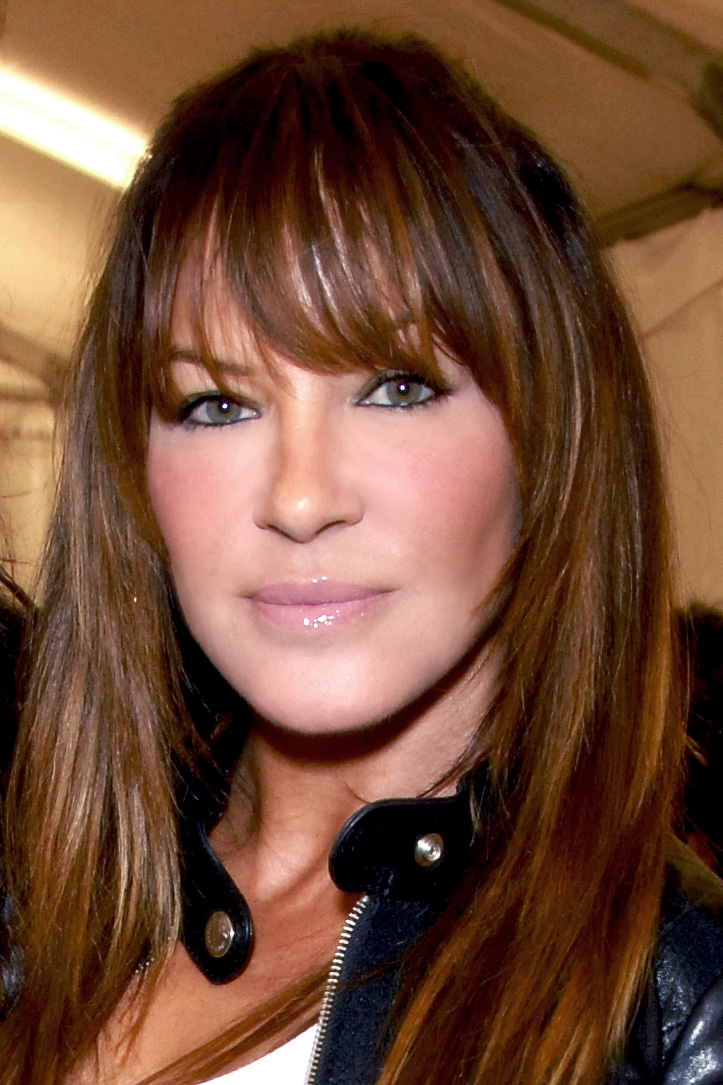
- Antin in 2008
- Born: July 6, 1961 (age 65); Los Angeles, California, U.S.
- Occupations: Dancer; choreographer
- Years active: 1984–present
- Known for: The Pussycat Dolls; Paradiso Girls; Girlicious; G.R.L.
- Relatives: Steve Antin (brother); Jonathan Antin (brother)

Robin Antin (born July 6, 1961) is an American dancer and choreographer. In 1995, she founded the modern burlesque troupe the Pussycat Dolls. By 2005, she diversified into various media including a pop recording group with international hits, a Las Vegas nightclub venue and floor show, various merchandise, and reality television. Since then, she has gone on to create other girl groups, including G.R.L., Girlicious and Paradiso Girls.

== Early life ==
Antin was born in Los Angeles, California. Her parents are British immigrants.

She is the sister of celebrity hair stylist Jonathan Antin, director Steve Antin and Neil Antin. She appeared in an episode of her brother Jonathan's show Blow Out.

== Music career ==
=== The Pussycat Dolls ===
Based in Las Vegas, it features a rotating cast of dancers around vocalist Jamie Preston. Current members include Hayley Zelniker, Amanda Nowak, Colby Lemmo and Alicia Blair. Former "Dolls" include lead vocalist and pop star Nicole Scherzinger, Rachel Sterling, who was also an original member of the burlesque troupe, Kelly Levesque, Christina Applegate, Carmen Electra, Laura Goulet, Michelle "Jersey" Maniscalco, Desiree Davis, Alicia Vela-Bailey, Mallory, Jen, Loreli, Victoria, Rosa, Marcea, Rita, Claude Racine, Natasha Vernase, Adriane Harper, Jessica Lea, Beverly Sizemore, Laura Diane, Ashley Gates, Bridget Nicole, Jennifer Affronti, Sheila Joy, Cindy Leos, Laurel Anderson, Angela Case, Meredith "Sevin" Kerr, Gina Katon and Jamie Lee Ruiz from Pussycat Dolls Present: Girlicious.

The Pussycat Dolls Burlesque Revue was founded in 2008 with Jamie Lee Ruiz, alongside Michelle "Jersey" Maniscalco, Jessi Peralta, Stephanie Moseley, Courtney Parker, Fransesca Ramirez, Alexis (Allie Steel), Molly D'Amour, and Jenny Robinson. Dani Levine, Katarzyna "Kasia Moss" Moś, Vanessa Curry, guest dancer Chantal Hunt and Allarie Long. Alongside lead singer, Jaime Preston and dancers Tarin Pratt and Erica Kiehl Jenkins, and guest vocalist, former Paradiso Girls member, Lauren Bennett were later introduced. Current members include Sheila Joy, Megan Bostwick, Daymara Sabat, Colby Lemmo, Lauren Venandos, Emily Istre, Noelle Naone Brechler, Jenny Driebe, and Kaelee Jones. In 2012, Antin launched The Pussycat Doll Dollhouse in the historic Keating Hotel in San Diego. In 2015, Robin launched the Australian Pussycat Doll Burlesque Revue in Melbourne, Australia at Crown Casino in The Therapy Nightclub.

=== Girlicious ===
Girlicious was an American girl group consisting of Nichole Cordova, Natalie Mejia, Chrystina Sayers and Tiffanie Anderson. In 2009, Anderson left the group and in 2011, Mejia and Sayers also confirmed their departure. Later, in October 2011, Cordova announced the band's hiatus. Then Cordova confirmed her departure in April 2013 when she became a member of and was featured on The X Factor USA Season 3 with the new group Girls United, which she ultimately was kicked out of in 2014. The second album of Girlicious, named Rebuilt, was released on November 22, 2010, in Canada. The group was formed on the reality television show Pussycat Dolls Present: Girlicious. Although Antin originally intended to include only three members in the group, as stated in the first episode, she announced in the season finale that all four girls would be a part of Girlicious.

=== Paradiso Girls ===
The Paradiso Girls were a girl group consisting of five members from different countries; Chelsea Korka (who appeared in the reality show Pussycat Dolls Present: The Search for the Next Doll) from the United States, Aria Cascaval from France, Lauren Bennett and Kelly Beckett from the United Kingdom and Shar Mae Amor from the Philippines. They were signed to will.i.am Music Group/Interscope Records. Their debut single "Patron Tequila" featuring Lil' Jon and Eve was released on May 12, 2009, and a music video was shortly released afterwards. Their debut album Crazy Horse was expected to be released in July 2010; however, it was delayed until October, when Aria revealed the band had disbanded due to dissatisfaction with their label. Bennett went on to join Antin's next girl group formation in G.R.L.

=== G.R.L. ===
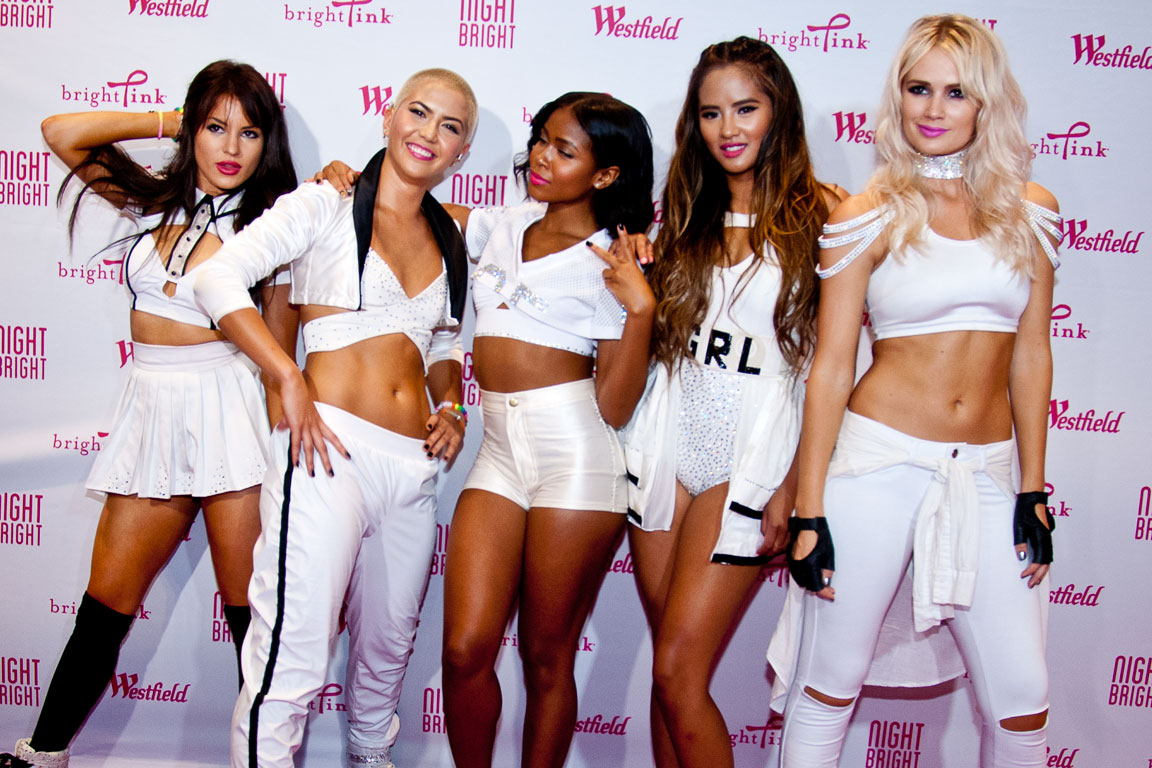
G.R.L. at Westfield Old Orchard Mall in Skokie, Illinois promoting their debut single "Vacation" on September 28, 2013. Left to right: Natasha Slayton, Paula van Oppen, Simone Battle, Emmalyn Estrada, Lauren Bennett.

G.R.L. is a girl group consisting of Lauren Bennett, Natasha Slayton, and Jazzy Mejia, Girlicious' Natalie Mejia's younger sister. It originally consisted of five members; Lauren Bennett, Paula van Oppen, Natasha Slayton, Simone Battle and Emmalyn Estrada, and was the most successful of Antin's girl group ventures since the original Pussycat Dolls pop group. The group was originally planned to be the new line up of the Pussycat Dolls following their disbandment in 2010. Robin later rebranded them as a new group to serve as the "next generation" of the Dolls. Their managers were Larry Rudolph and Adam Leber. On June 16, 2013, they released their first single, "Vacation", as a B-side track on Britney Spears' single "Ooh La La", a song from the film The Smurfs 2. Despite commercial success in the UK and Australia, the group officially disbanded on June 2, 2015, nine months after Simone Battle's death in September, 2014. However, on June 18, 2016, Robin Antin and their new rep, Matt Wynter, from Loco Talent's website confirmed that G.R.L. were officially reforming, without Paula Van Oppen and Emmalyn Estrada. On August 5, 2016, it was officially announced that Jazzy Mejia was added to the group, along with original members Lauren Bennett and Natasha Slayton, making G.R.L. officially a trio. Their music is set to be released in the summer, with works on a debut album. On August 16, 2016, the newly reformed group released their promotional single, "Kiss Myself" produced by Guy Furious. On December 9, 2016, the trio released their second single, "Are We Good?" produced by HooknSling. According to Lauren Bennett, during the interview on The New Music Buzz, this is the lead single to the group's debut upcoming album. These two singles that the trio were credited as songwriters.

=== Matt Goss and the Dirty Virgins ===
After becoming Goss's agent, Antin cast the Dirty Virgins, a Vegas-based girl former dance group consisting of Tala Marie, Emily Istre, Amber William, and Monteece Mask and new dancer include Veronica Collazo Marrero, Kaelee Jones, Teresa Antonette, Ashley Belle, Angela Acosta, Anna Sambeck to accompany Goss for his show. Along with them, she cast singers Mecca Madison and Angela Jude. From a style point of view they are very much like the original concept of the Pussycat Dolls.

== Other projects ==
=== Other choreography ===
As a choreographer, Antin worked with Paris Hilton, Anastacia, Pink, the Offspring and No Doubt. Additionally, she was responsible for the dance ensembles in various films.

On January 2, 2010, Antin, Tony Selznick, and Paula Abdul presented choreography agent Julie McDonald with an award for being a pioneer of dance representation and a friend, helper, and agent to many choreographers for over 25 years. The award was presented at The Carnival: Choreographer's Ball 11th Anniversary Show.

She was a judge on the Lifetime reality television show Abby's Ultimate Dance Competition in Season 1. Antin was also an associate choreographer and a creative co-producer on the stage musical Burlesque, based on the 2010 film of the same name by her brother, Steve Antin.

=== Clothing line ===
During 2008, It was reported that Antin and the La Senza Corporation of Canada were producing a line of Burlesque/Pussycat Dolls-styled lingerie called "Shhh...by Robin". The line ranges from "girly and flirtatious" to "sexy and glamorous" intimate apparel. Antin says, "the words for me on this collection are flirtatious, fashion and fun!" Paradiso Girls, Lauren Bennett and Kelly Beckett as well as Pussycat Doll Revue dancer Jersey Maniscalco modeled for it.

In 2015, Antin partnered up with Australian fashion designer, Kylie Gulliver launching a lifestyle clothing line brand, Elliot Label.

=== Work-out DVD ===
On her Twitter account, Antin announced the release of a workout DVD featuring Jamie Ruiz from Pussycat Dolls Present: Girlicious and other Burlesque Dolls Jenny Ronbinson and Michelle "Jersey" Maniscalco (whose pictures she posted on her Twitter account), as well as Chrystina Sayers and Nicole Scherzinger. It was released worldwide on December 15, 2009.

== Advertising ==
- Carl's Jr. ad "That's Hot" featuring Paris Hilton

== Filmography ==
- The Terminator
- Jailbird Rock
- Matters of Consequence
- Friends
- MTV Bash
- MTV Movie Awards
- My VH1 Awards
- Newlyweds: Nick and Jessica (one episode, "The Dancers")
- Pinocchio and the Emperor of the Night
- Pussycat Dolls Present: The Search for the Next Doll
- Pussycat Dolls Present: Girlicious
- Mel B: It's a Scary World (one episode)
- Keeping Up with the Kardashians
- Megan Wants a Millionaire (guest judge)
- My Chauffeur (1986)
- Jailbird Rock (1988)
- Anchorman: The Legend of Ron Burgundy (2004)
