= Victor Doyle =

Victor Doyle may refer to:

- Victor Doyle, fictional character in Revolution (TV series)
- Victor Doyle, fictional character in The Smurfs 2
