= G.R.L. =

American girl group

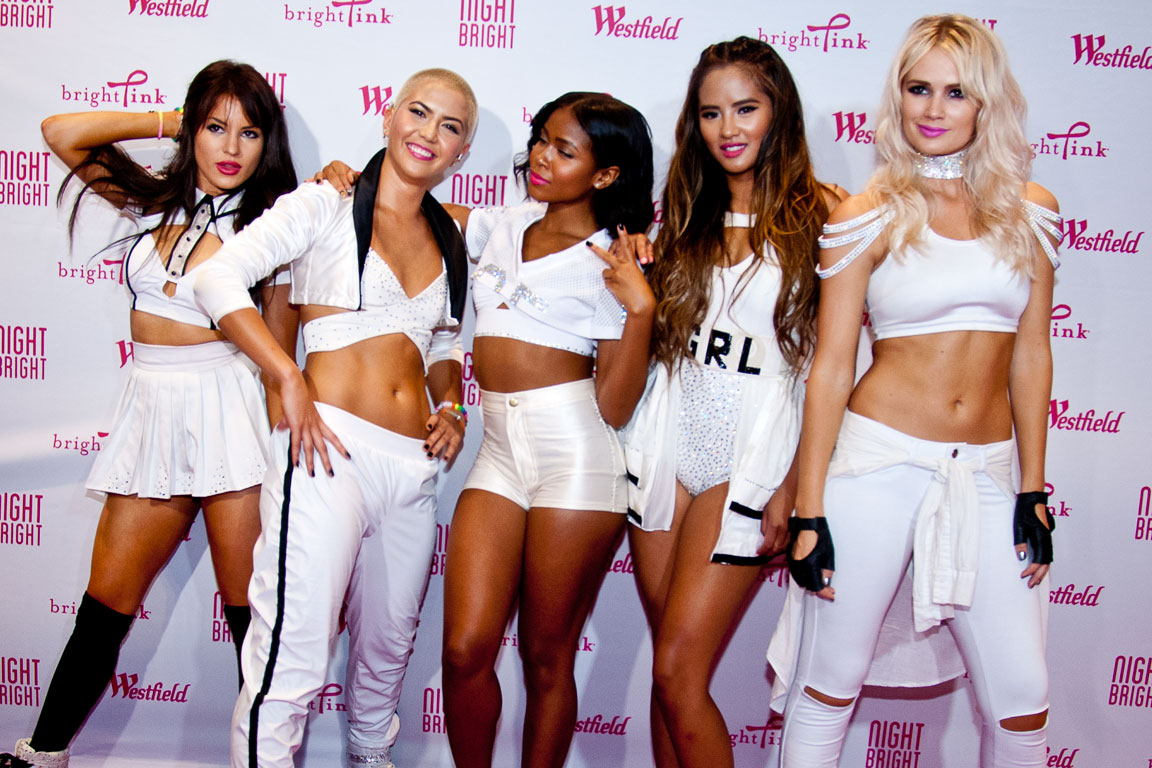
- Natasha Slayton, Paula van Oppen, Simone Battle, Emmalyn Estrada, and Lauren Bennett in September 2013

Background information
- Years active: 2011–2015; 2016–2021
- Labels: Kemosabe; RCA
- Spinoff of: The Pussycat Dolls
- Past members: Lauren Bennett; Paula van Oppen; Natasha Slayton; Simone Battle; Emmalyn Estrada; Jazzy Mejia

G.R.L. was an American girl group originally comprising Lauren Bennett, Natasha Slayton, Paula van Oppen, Emmalyn Estrada and Simone Battle. In 2014, the group featured on Pitbull's single "Wild Wild Love", which peaked at number 30 on the Billboard Hot 100 and at number 6 on the UK singles chart, had a hit with their own "Ugly Heart", which charted at number 2 in Ireland and Australia, and founded the G.R.L. Gives an Hour mental health campaign. In 2015, the group supported Meghan Trainor on her That Bass Tour.

== History ==
G.R.L. took its name from the word girl and had been deliberately misspelled on the basis that the word team does not contain the letter I. The band was formed by choreographer Robin Antin, who had previously put together the bands Girlicious, Paradiso Girls, and The Pussycat Dolls. The lattermost was formed in 1995 as a burlesque troupe before morphing into a pop group all members left in 2010; Antin also put together The Pussycat Dolls Burlesque Revue. By November 2011, the Revue's members had included Vanessa Curry, a former Laker Girl; Paula van Oppen, who had been in Burlesque and on So You Think You Can Dance; and English Paradiso Girls alumnus Lauren Bennett, who had featured on LMFAO's "Party Rock Anthem" earlier that year. Curry and Bennett had also helped Antin promote "Robin Antin's Pussycat Dolls: Dancer's Body Workout".

Antin announced in March 2011 that she was holding auditions to reform the disbanded The Pussycat Dolls as a pop group. That November, she denied having confirmed a lineup following a Perez Hilton post (Note: Bennett, van Oppen, Vanessa Curry, Taz Zavala, Kristal Lyndriette Smith, and Kia Hampton.) and Bennett joined the group. A Pussycat Dolls line-up featuring Bennett, van Oppen, Curry, Girlicious alumnus Chrystina Sayers, and Dallas Cowboys cheerleader Erica Jenkins had performed in a GoDaddy commercial broadcast during February 2012's Super Bowl XLVI. Sayers, Curry, and Jenkins had been replaced by Amanda Branche, Girlicious alumnus Natalie Mejia, and Me and You and Everyone We Know actress Natasha Slayton by July. Branche and Mejia were later replaced by Simone Battle, who joined in August and had made the top 17 on the first series of The X Factor, and Canadian musician Emmalyn Estrada, who had released minor hits in her home country and appeared in Bates Motel.

Antin changed the band's name to G.R.L. in February 2013 on the grounds that the band's music was less urban than that of The Pussycat Dolls. Following G.R.L.'s debut at Chateau Marmont in April 2013, the band signed to Dr. Luke's Kemosabe Records in conjunction with RCA Records and released their debut single "Vacation" on the label in June. "Vacation" was included on the soundtrack for the animated movie The Smurfs 2 as a B-side to Britney Spears's "Ooh La La" and was intended for a debut album, for which the band worked with Dr. Luke, Max Martin, and Cirkut on material. They then released "Show Me What You Got", which appeared on a US Now That's What I Call Music! album, and featured on Pitbull's February 2014 single "Wild Wild Love", which peaked at number 30 on the Billboard Hot 100 and number 6 on the UK singles chart.

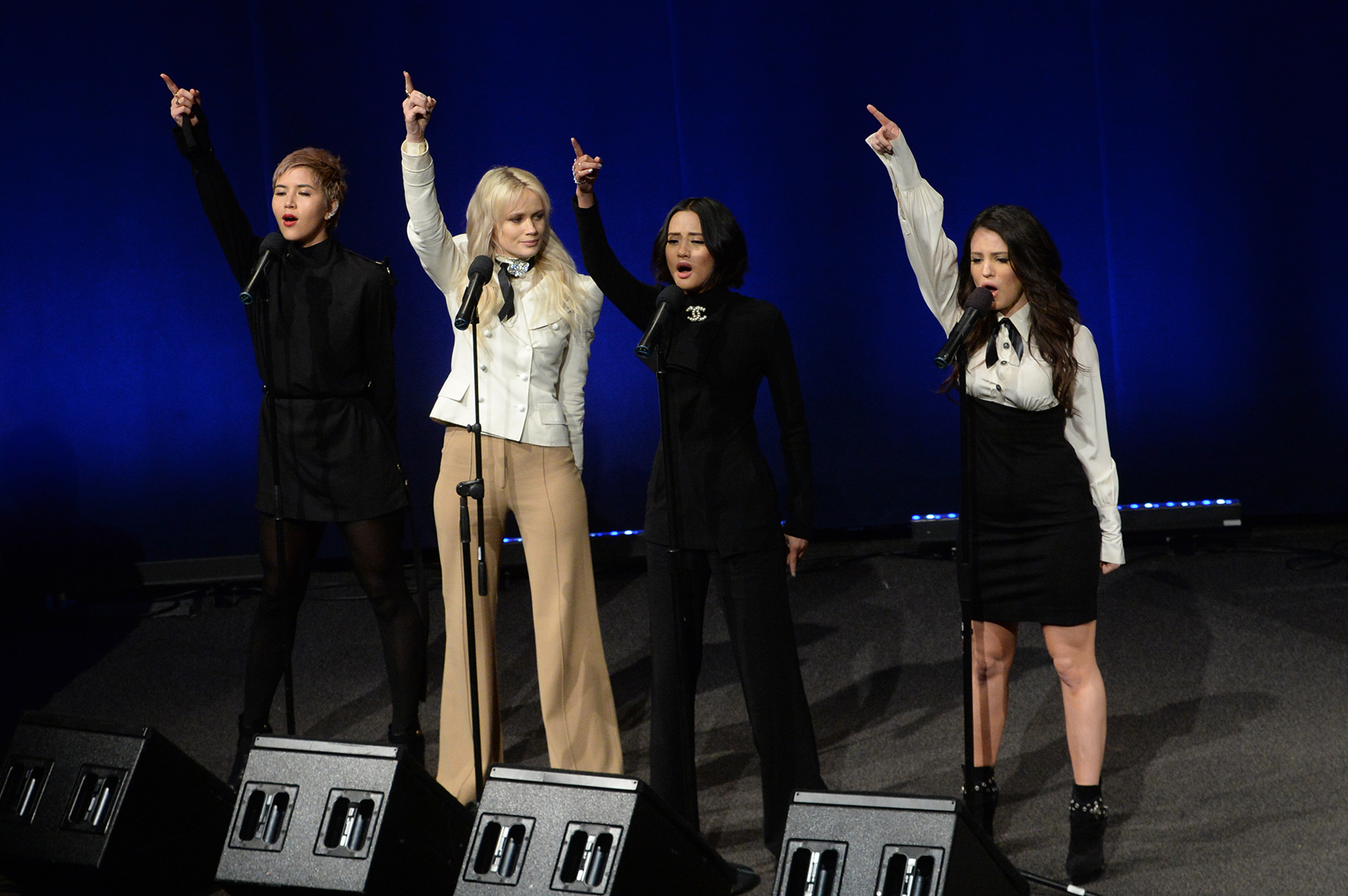
G.R.L. performing during the Campaign to Change Direction in Washington, D.C., 2015

G.R.L.'s track "Ugly Heart" was leaked in March, released in America in June 2014, and released in the UK in August. The track diversified the band's usual sound from dance-pop to indie pop and reached number 2 in Australia and Ireland, the top five in New Zealand, number 11 in the UK, and the top 20 in several other countries. "Ugly Heart" was also certified quadruple-platinum in Australia and featured on the band's self-titled EP in July 2014, the latter alongside "Show Me What You Got". Battle died by suicide at the age of 25 less than a week after the UK release of "Ugly Heart"; her death led G.R.L.'s surviving members to release the tribute single "Lighthouse", mount the G.R.L. Gives an Hour mental health campaign with Give an Hour in her honor, launch the firm's Campaign to Change Direction with Michelle Obama, and disband shortly after supporting Meghan Trainor on her That Bass Tour in June 2015. As of their dissolution, they had not released their debut album.

Bennett and Slayton reformed G.R.L. with Jazzy Mejia in August 2016 and released the singles "Kiss Myself" and "Are We Good" in September and December. Shortly after the former, Little Mix were accused of plagiarising "Ugly Heart" for their single "Shout Out to My Ex", prompting Little Mix to discuss the two songs' similarities during a Belgian radio interview. Bennett and Slayton toured with Mejia until 2020, when the pair briefly reunited with Estrada and van Oppen; Estrada stayed into 2021. Slayton used a July 2025 podcast appearance to blame money for the band's subsequent dissolution and a 2026 joint post with Estrada and van Oppen to announce Bennett's death.

== Discography ==
=== Extended plays ===
Title	Details
G.R.L.	Released: July 29, 2014; Format: Digital download; Label: Kemosabe, RCA

=== Singles ===
==== As lead artists ====
List of singles, with selected chart positions and certifications
Title	Year	Peak chart positions								Certifications	Album
Title	Year	US Bub.	AUS	IRE	NL	NOR	NZ	SWE	UK	Certifications	Album
"Vacation"	2013	—	—	—	—	—	—	—	—		Music from and Inspired by The Smurfs 2
"Show Me What You Got"	2014	—	—	—	—	—	—	—	—		G.R.L.
"Ugly Heart"	2014	22	2	2	84	17	3	7	11	ARIA: 4× Platinum; BPI: 2× Platinum; RMNZ: 3× Platinum	G.R.L.
"Lighthouse"	2015	—	30	59	—	—	18	—	55	RMNZ: Platinum	Non-album singles
"Kiss Myself"	2016	—	—	—	—	—	—	—	—		Non-album singles
"Are We Good?"	2016	—	—	—	—	—	—	—	—		Non-album singles
"—" denotes releases that did not chart or were not released in that territory.

==== As featured artists ====
List of singles, with selected chart positions and certifications
Title	Year	Peak chart positions								Certifications	Album
Title	Year	US	AUS	CAN	FRA	IRE	NOR	NZ	UK	Certifications	Album
"Wild Wild Love" (Pitbull featuring G.R.L.)	2014	30	10	22	90	30	7	25	6	ARIA: Platinum; BPI: Silver; MC: Platinum; RIAA: Platinum; RMNZ: Gold	Globalization

=== Music videos ===
List of music videos, showing director
Title	Year	Ref
"Vacation"	2013	
"Wild Wild Love"	2014	
"Ugly Heart"	2014	
"Lighthouse"	2015	
"Are We Good?"	2017	

== Members ==
- Lauren Bennett (2011–2015, 2016–2021, died 2026)
- Simone Battle (2012–2014, died 2014)
- Emmalyn Estrada (2012–2015, 2020–2021)
- Natasha Slayton (2012–2015, 2016–2021)
- Paula van Oppen (2012–2015, 2020)
- Jazzy Mejia (2016–2020)

== Tours ==
Supporting

- 2015 – That Bass Tour – support for Meghan Trainor
