= Jonathan Antin =

American businessman

- Born: Beverly Hills
- Occupation: Hair stylist
- Relatives: Robin Antin (sister); Steve Antin (brother)

Jonathan Antin is the former owner of two Los Angeles hair salons, Jonathan Salon West Hollywood and Jonathan Salon Beverly Hills. His life as an entrepreneur and a celebrity hair stylist was the basis for a reality television series, Blow Out. He was a judge on the third season of Shear Genius and has appeared on other television shows. He was a judge for the 2007 Miss USA pageant. He developed a hair care product line, which broke QVC's record for the top hair care launch in 2005.

== Personal life ==
Antin grew up in Beverly Hills, California. His mother is an interior designer and his father, Michael, is an artist. He is the brother of writer and producer Steve Antin and Robin Antin, who is the founder of The Pussycat Dolls, a burlesque and dance troupe. As a young boy, he was inspired by the movie Shampoo to become a hair stylist. He says that he was a bit of a ruffian with tattoos and "always the black sheep at Beverly Hills High (School)." He dropped out of high school to attend a beauty school.

Jonathan Antin married Sescie Karabuykov, a boutique owner, about 2006. They have a son, Asher, who was born about November 2005 and a daughter, Jocie, born in 2007. He is a basketball coach for his son's team. He is of British Jewish descent.

== Career ==
=== Hair salons ===
Antin was a student at the Fairfax Beauty Academy, and then worked at a salon in the Beverly Center in West Hollywood. He opened a salon when he was 23 years old. By 1999, he was considered one of Hollywood's top stylists and has made hairstyle changes needed by a client to suit a part, such as hair styles from different periods. His clients have included Madonna, Tiger Woods, Steven Tyler, k.d. lang, Ricky Martin, and Tobey Maguire. He created a hair care line, Jonathan Product, which broke a record at QVC in 2005 for the most successful hair care launch, having sold 35,000 units in one hour. Also sold in retail stores, the line became a multi-million dollar business. In 2010, he sold his shares of the company.

After Jonathan West Hollywood, he opened Jonathan Salon Beverly Hills. He later sold both salons and for a few years made high-priced house calls for his client. He returned to Beverly Hills with a salon, Jonathan Antin Salon. He is a spokesman for Mindbody Salon, a salon business software company, for which he hosts hair-advice Q&As on Twitter for an hour each month.

=== Television ===
The first season of the reality series Blow Out, which follows Antin's life, was filmed in 2004. It takes place in Jonathan Salon Beverly Hills, opened for the show and staffed by 12 stylists and assistants. The show was not received well by the press, who were critical of his management style, hairdo, and speech patterns.

Christopher Kelly said, "Antin's droning, cooler-than-thou voice drips with disdain. He glowers at his employees, berates them for giving bad haircuts, complains that they aren't bringing in enough new clients. Before every commercial break, someone is on the verge of tears and/or about to be fired." Antin acknowledged his outbursts, and said that he was apologetic at the time. On the show, Antin tells his employees that it's because he respects them so much that he rides them (so much), and he really does love them. In the first season Jay Leno and Kirsten Dunst made appearances on the show.

Antin was a judge in 2010 on the third season of the reality-series Shear Genius. He joined the cast of L.A. Hair in 2015. Since 2004, he appeared on an episode of Bravo's makeover show Queer Eye for the Straight Guy, in American Express television commercials, and in 2010 on the tenth season of The Biggest Loser, giving makeovers to the show's final six contestants. With hairstylist Amanda George he opened the Jonathan and George salon in January 2013. The salon's clients include Victoria Beckham, Kristen Stewart, Jennifer Garner, Patrick Dempsey, Kate Hudson, Leonardo DiCaprio, Zooey Deschanel, and Rita Ora. Antin appeared on The Millionaire Matchmaker in 2015. He was a judge for the Miss USA 2007 Pageant.
