= Lighthouse (G.R.L. song) =

Single by G.R.L.

from the album G.R.L.
- Released: January 15, 2015
- Recorded: 2014
- Genre: Pop
- Length: 3:34
- Label: Kemosabe; RCA
- Songwriters: Lukasz Gottwald; Theron Thomas; Timothy Thomas; Henry Walter
- Producers: Dr. Luke; Cirkut

G.R.L. singles chronology
"Ugly Heart" (2014)	"Lighthouse" (2015)	"Are We Good" (2016)

Music video
- "Lighthouse" on YouTube

"Lighthouse" is the third single by American-British-Canadian girl group G.R.L., and the first single following the death of group member Simone Battle, who died by suicide in 2014. The song features songwriting credits from Lukasz Gottwald, and Henry Walter, with production credits from Gottwald and Walter under their production monikers, Dr. Luke and Cirkut. The track was released on January 15, 2015. "Lighthouse" was recorded in the memory of Battle.

The song's accompanying music video was directed by Daniel Carberry. It features footage and photos of Battle during her time with G.R.L., while the group sing in a room filled with hanging light bulbs. "Lighthouse" was supposed to be the final single released by G.R.L., as the group disbanded in June 2015. However, the group reunited the following year with the intention of releasing new music.

== Background ==
On September 5, 2014, band member Simone Battle was found dead by suicide in her home, a month after the release of G.R.L.'s self-titled debut EP. Member Lauren Bennett recalled, "We'd just been in rehearsals the day before, learning choreography for our show, and the next day we were starting the morning as usual when we got the call. I still can't believe it. I don't think any of us can. It's weird that we're even sitting here, talking about it." Paula Van Oppen stated that everything "came to a stop" for the group and it took four months for them to come together and discuss their future. They teamed up with Give an Hour, an American organization that helps raise awareness of mental health issues. The band wanted the topic of mental health and depression to be talked about more openly, especially among their younger fans, as well as what signs to look out for. Van Oppen explained that she and the other members of G.R.L. were unaware of what Battle was going through in the lead up to her death, so they wanted to spread the message about being open with mental health and to help people with it.

The song was co-written by Cirkut and Rock City. Dr. Luke and Cirkut approached the group with the song, and they thought it expressed how they were all feeling at the time. The group recorded "Lighthouse" in memory of Battle. It is a ballad about "being there for your friends". Bennett commented that recording the song without Battle was one of the hardest things they had ever done. She also said, "It's a positive message, a positive song, and I think it's gonna be great moving forward with the charity we're going to associate with. We really want to try and fit everything hand in hand." Emmalyn Estrada added that G.R.L. were taking things slowly, but were focused on the song and "the positive message overall, about being together in hard times."

== Commercial performance ==
For the week commencing January 26, 2015, "Lighthouse" debuted at number 38 on the ARIA Singles Chart in Australia. The track peaked at number 18 on the New Zealand singles chart. In the United Kingdom, "Lighthouse" debuted at number 55 on the UK Singles Chart issued for 15 March 2015 due to lack of streaming and despite being at number 35 on the sales-only based version of the chart. It also peaked at number 24 on the Scottish Singles Chart.

== Music video ==
The accompanying music video was directed by Daniel Carberry. The group wanted to make the video about Battle and worked closely with her family, who contributed footage and photos of her. Estrada admitted that the video shoot was not easy for the group, so they decided to keep it simple. She explained "We wanted to just perform the song. I think collectively, us girls and the team, we made a good choice when it came to reflecting Simone in the best way."

The music video premiered the same day as the song's release. The video depicts the four members singing in a dark room filled with hanging light-bulbs singing the lyrics of the song, while footage and photos of Battle with her family and her rehearsing with the band are cut in as well as home movies from when she was a child. During the final chorus, the four members embrace and cry all together, which was a spontaneous moment caught by cameras.

As of July 2018, the video has been viewed more than 8 million times on YouTube.

== Charts ==
Chart (2015)	Peak position
Australia (ARIA)	30
Ireland (IRMA)	59
New Zealand (Recorded Music NZ)	18
Scottish Singles Sales (Official Charts)	24
UK Singles (Official Charts)	55

== Certifications ==
Region	Certification	Certified units/sales
New Zealand (RMNZ)	Platinum	15,000^{*}
^{*} Sales figures based on certification alone.

== Release history ==
Country	Date	Format
United States	January 15, 2015	Digital download
Australia	January 15, 2015	Digital download
United Kingdom	January 15, 2015	Digital download
