= I Wish I Wish =

Single by Lauren Bennett
- Released: December 6, 2011
- Genre: Pop; dance-pop
- Length: 3:15
- Label: Interscope
- Songwriters: Esmée Denters; Billy Mann
- Producer: David Schuler

Lauren Bennett singles chronology
"Party Rock Anthem" (2011)	"I Wish I Wish" (2011)	"Hurricane" (2016)

"I Wish I Wish" is a song by the English singer Lauren Bennett. The song was written by Esmée Denters and Billy Mann and produced by David Schuler. It was released by Interscope Records as Bennett's debut single on November 21, 2011. A dance-pop song, it is about celebrating every day and living life to the fullest.

== Background ==
Bennett's debut solo single "I Wish I Wish" was released on 21 November 2011 via Interscope Records. The track was written by Esmée Denters and Billy Mann, and produced by David Schuler.

== Track listings ==
Digital download

1. "I Wish I Wish"

== Release history ==
Region	Date	Label	Format
United States	21 November 2011	Interscope	Digital download
