= Hurricane (Lauren Bennett song) =

Single by Lauren Bennett
- Released: May 2, 2016
- Recorded: 2016
- Genre: Pop
- Length: 3:23
- Label: Geffen; Interscope
- Songwriter: Lauren Bennett
- Producers: Linus Altman-Kurosaki; Trevor Klaiman

Lauren Bennett singles chronology
"I Wish I Wish" (2011)	"Hurricane" (2016)

"Hurricane" is a song by Lauren Bennett and her final solo single to be released during her lifetime prior to her death in 2026. The song was released on May 2, 2016.

== Background ==
Bennett's second solo single "Hurricane" was released on May 2, 2016, via Interscope Records.

In an Instagram post on May 8, 2016, Bennett explained her inspiration for the single, saying "After G.R.L. ended I had no idea what was going to happen next, everything fell apart pretty fast. That's when this song was written. After seeing my mother suffer with mental struggles for years I then lost a friend to this. It has always effected my life in someway. We all at least know someone who has dealt with it or have yourself. This is a story to show from my eyes what it feels like to suffer from this but also the other perspective to lose someone to this". It was later announced on Twitter that a portion of the proceeds from the single would be donated to The Campaign to Change Direction, an organization dedicated to change the culture of mental health in America.

== Release history ==
Region	Date	Label	Format
United States	2 May 2016	Geffen; Interscope	Digital download
