= Get Up (Mary Mary song) =

Single by Mary Mary

from the album The Sound
- Released: July 15, 2008
- Recorded: 2008
- Genre: Urban contemporary gospel
- Length: 3:14
- Label: My Block/Columbia
- Songwriters: Warryn Campbell, Erica Campbell, Tina Campbell, Eric Dawkins
- Producer: Warryn Campbell

Mary Mary singles chronology
"Believer" (2006)	"Get Up" (2008)	"God in Me" (2009)

"Get Up" is a song by Mary Mary, released as the lead single from their fourth studio album The Sound. The single was written and produced by both Mary Mary and producer Warryn Campbell, husband of member Erica Campbell. The song is known as "the movement anthem". According to the group, the song was written and produced to appeal to young generations with a mainstream sound that still captures the message of the gospel. The group's goal was achieved when the song received moderate success in dance clubs worldwide, while holding the #1 spot on the U.S.'s Hot Dance Club Play chart. The song was also used on the syndicated morning show Get Up Mornings with Erica Campbell hosted by Campbell herself.

In December 2008, the song received two Grammy Award nominations for the 51st Grammy Awards of 2009 in the categories "Best Gospel Song" and "Best Gospel Performance". On February 8, 2009, Mary Mary won the Grammy for Best Gospel Performance.

== Music video ==
The music video for "Get Up" starts off with the girls sitting down and singing, and later getting up to represent the song's lyrics. The video's main character is a young girl (the late Simone Battle) auditioning for a dance contest. She feels frightened, but motivates herself and goes in front of the judges. The videos has many cameos of dancers and family and friends of the girls. Mary Mary's lawyer also appears in the video. The production of the clip was tracked by BET's Access Granted television series, with the final cut eventually premiering on small screen on August 21, 2008 at the end of its Access Granted episode and online at 3:00 pm PT on Yahoo! Music.

== Formats and track listings ==
These are the formats and track listings of major single-releases of "Get Up".

U.S. promo CD

1. "Get Up" (main version) – 3:14
2. "Get Up" (instrumental) – 3:16

Digital Remix EP

1. "Get Up" (karmatronics club) – 6:01
2. "Get Up" (karmatronics instrumental) – 6:01
3. "Get Up" (fusion remix) – 7:07
4. "Get Up" (fusion dub) – 5:53
5. "Get Up" (fusion instrumental) – 7:06
6. "Get Up" (mark alston club) – 7:20
7. "Get Up" (mark alston dub) – 7:18
8. "Get Up" (mark alston instrumental) – 7:20
9. "Get Up" (jamie j sanchez club remix) – 8:31

== Chart performance ==
The single was officially released to U.S. radios on July 5, 2008. The single soon release digitally July 15, 2008 via iTunes and other music websites. It has peaked within the top 30 of the national R&B/hip hop, club play, and gospel charts, and also the global dance charts.

Chart (2008)	Peak position
US Billboard Bubbling Under Hot 100 Singles	6
US Hot R&B/Hip-Hop Songs (Billboard)	30
US Dance Club Songs (Billboard)	1
US Hot Gospel Songs	2

== Awards ==
The song won a Dove Award for Urban Recorded Song of the Year at the 40th GMA Dove Awards.
