= Ooh La La (Britney Spears song) =

2013 single by Britney Spears

Single by Britney Spears

from the album The Smurfs 2: Music from and Inspired By
- B-side: "Vacation"
- Released: June 17, 2013
- Recorded: January 20, 2013
- Genre: Synth-pop
- Length: 4:17
- Label: Kemosabe Kids; RCA
- Composers: Lukasz Gottwald; Joshua Coleman; Henry Walter; Jacob Kasher Hindlin; Fransisca Hall
- Lyricists: Lukasz Gottwald; Bonnie McKee; Lola Blanc
- Producers: Dr. Luke; Ammo; Cirkut

Britney Spears singles chronology
"Scream & Shout" (2012)	"Ooh La La" (2013)	"Work Bitch" (2013)

Music video
- "Ooh La La" on YouTube

"Ooh La La" is a song recorded by American singer Britney Spears for the soundtrack of the 2013 family film The Smurfs 2. It was written and produced by Lukasz "Dr. Luke" Gottwald, Joshua "Ammo" Coleman, Henry "Cirkut" Walter, with additional writing from Bonnie McKee, Jacob Kasher Hindlin, Lola Blanc, and Fransisca Hall.

== Background and production ==
"Ooh La La" was written by Ammo, Fransisca Hall, and Lola Blanc, and was intended to become Blanc's debut single as it was a play on her name. However, upon the request of producer Dr. Luke, a deal was made in which Spears was allowed to record the track. He collaborated with additional writers Cirkut, Jacob Kasher, and Bonnie McKee to rewrite some lyrics into a more child-friendly nature. Production was handled by Dr. Luke, Cirkut, and Ammo. Spears decided to record this song to contribute to the soundtrack of The Smurfs 2 because, in her own words, she "always loved the Smurfs as a kid and now my boys are the biggest Smurfs fans EVER. I wanted to surprise them with a song in the movie. I know they'll think it's Smurftastic!".

== Composition ==
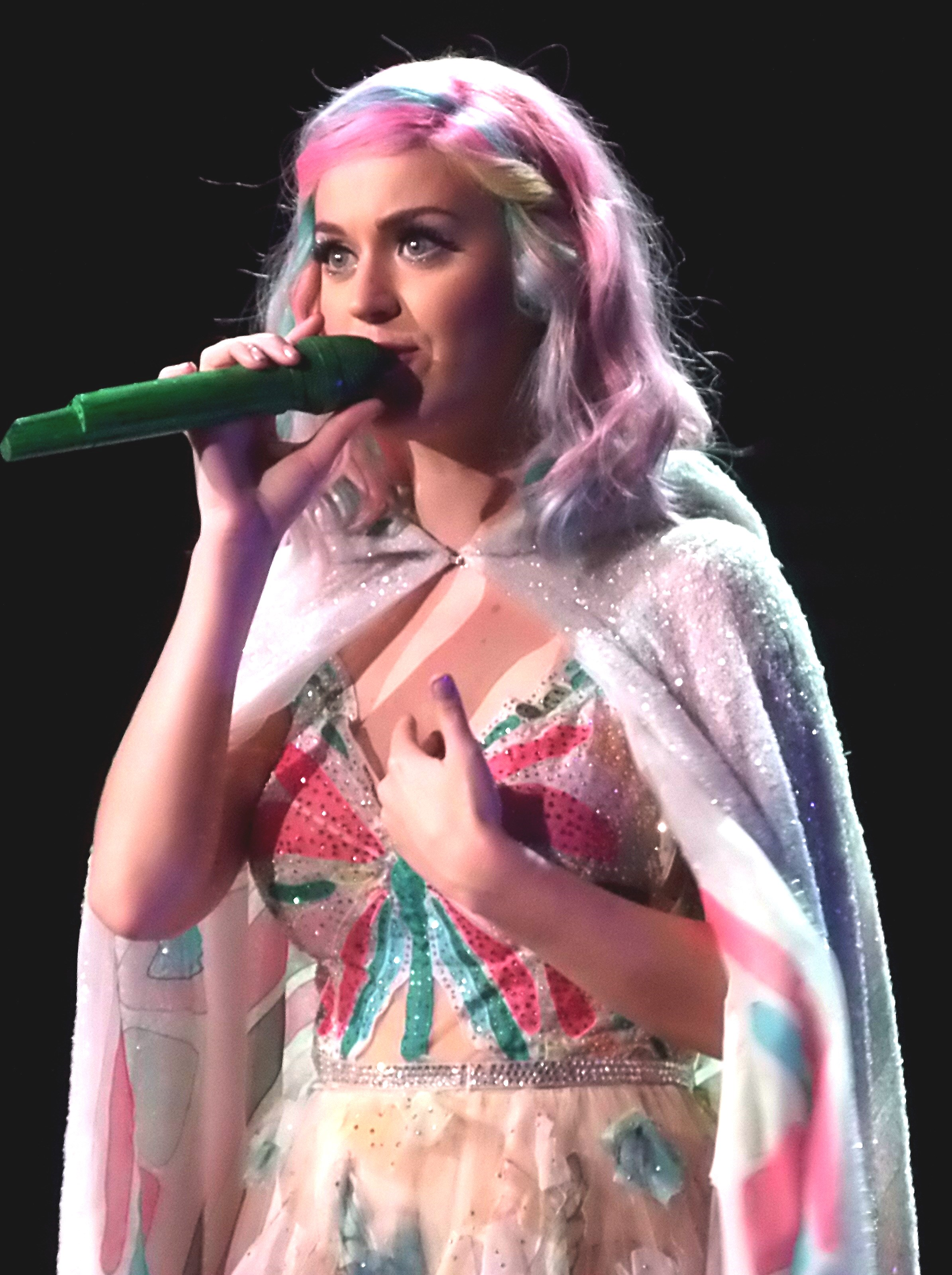
Katy Perry (pictured) and Bonnie McKee provided some background vocals on the song.

"Ooh La La" is a synth-pop song. Writing for E! Online, Alexis L. Loinaz described the song as "vintage Britney", with an "oddly folksy pop-tart twist." Melinda Newman of HitFix deemed it a "sweet, slight, little love song" which is about "loving someone for their true blue self." It begins as a "pure pop" song mixed with electronica. The song then transitions, with Spears "speak-singing, Kesha style", over an electroclash beat. This is followed by an acoustic-guitar-driven section, which, according to Newman, is "fluffy, retro pop", similar to Madonna in the early 1980s. "Ooh La La" contains a "compelling breakdown", which is "full of scrambled vocals" and "dense beats", that lasts for a duration of 30 seconds. Spears' "whimsical vocals" contain "catchy ditty layers." Singer Katy Perry revealed during the film's premiere that she, along with co-writer Bonnie McKee, provided some background vocals on the song. The song has been composed in the key of F♯ major. It has a BPM of 128 crotchet beats per minute. It follows a chord progression of B-C♯-F♯-D♯m in the chorus.

== Critical reception ==
"Ooh La La" received generally positive response from critics. Rolling Stone's Dan Reilly highlighted the song's catchiness, writing "now that you've heard it, try and get it out of your head". An editor from Billboard magazine described the track as a "sweet spot of sugary synth-pop", adding that the song is "highlighted by a compelling breakdown, full of scrambled vocals and dense beats." Brian Mansfield of USA Today stated that "Momma Spears' kid-friendly track is energetic to the point of hyperactivity, caroming from a rap section to an acoustic-guitar-driven chorus to a buzzy electronic breakdown. Smurftastic? Maybe." Jenna Hally Rubenstein from MTV News was enthusiastic about the song, describing it as a "bright, sunshiny pop jam that perfectly caters to the Smurfs 2 demographic."

In 2014, "Ooh La La" was nominated for two Radio Disney Music Awards for Best Song That Makes You Smile and Favorite Song from a Movie or a TV Show. The award's ceremony took place on April 26, 2014, with the song winning the award for Best Song That Makes You Smile.

== Music video ==
The music video was filmed in June and was directed by Marc Klasfeld. The video features appearances by Spears' children, Sean Preston and Jayden James Federline, as well as a brief appearance by Spears' niece, Maddie Aldridge. The video premiered on Spears' Vevo channel at 12PM ET on July 11, 2013. MSN Music described the opening scene from the video as an homage to the video for Janet Jackson's 1986 song "Nasty", stating that "the clip plays out like a more kid-friendly version of Janet Jackson's 'Nasty' video, with Spears and her kids taking in a movie when mom is suddenly transported into the on-screen action."

The video features Spears and her sons watching The Smurfs 2 in a theater and as Gargamel zaps Spears, she finds herself in Smurf village singing and dancing with the smurfs. The music video heavily samples clips of the movie.

== Track listings ==
CD single / digital single / 7"
No.	Title	Writer(s)	Length
1.	"Ooh La La" (performed by Britney Spears)	Lukasz Gottwald; Joshua Coleman; Henry Walter; Bonnie McKee; Jacob Kasher Hindlin; Lola Blanc; Fransisca Hall	4:17
2.	"Vacation" (performed by G.R.L.)	Gottwald; Max Martin; McKee; Walter	3:36
Total length:			7:53

German CD single
No.	Title	Writer(s)	Length
1.	"Ooh La La"	Gottwald; Coleman; Walter; McKee; Hindlin; Blanc; Hall	4:14
2.	"Ooh La La" (Instrumental)	Gottwald; Coleman; Walter; McKee; Hindlin; Blanc; Hall	4:14
Total length:			8:28

== Credits and personnel ==
Credited personnel list adapted from track info on Tidal.

- Britney Spears – vocals
- Katy Perry – backing vocals (uncredited)
- Kandice Melonakos – composer, lyricist
- Fransisca Hall – composer, lyricist
- Jacob Kasher Hindlin – composer, lyricist
- Bonnie McKee – composer, lyricist
- Henry Walter – composer, lyricist, producer, programmer
- Lukasz Gottwald – composer, lyricist, producer, programmer
- Joshua Coleman – composer, lyricist, producer, programmer
- Emily Wright – engineer
- Clint Gibbs – engineer
- John Hanes – engineer

== Charts ==
=== Weekly charts ===
Chart (2013–2014)	Peak position
Belgium (Ultratip Bubbling Under Flanders)	11
Belgium (Ultratip Bubbling Under Wallonia)	8
Canada Hot 100 (Billboard)	37
Canada CHR/Top 40 (Billboard)	21
Canada Hot AC (Billboard)	29
CIS Airplay (TopHit)	158
France (SNEP)	73
Germany (GfK)	86
Hungary (Single Top 40)	5
Japan Hot 100 (Billboard)	54
Netherlands (Dutch Top 40 Tipparade)	13
South Korea (Gaon Digital Chart)	133
South Korea International Singles (Gaon)	1
UK Singles (Official Charts)	72
US Billboard Hot 100	54
US Pop Airplay (Billboard)	21

=== Monthly charts ===
Monthly chart performance for "Ooh La La"
Chart (2013)	Position
South Korea Foreign (Circle)	7

=== Year-end charts ===
Chart (2013)	Position
South Korea (Gaon International Chart)	123

== Sales ==
Region	Certification	Certified units/sales
South Korea (Gaon)	—	72,468

== Release history ==
Region	Date	Format	Label
France	June 17, 2013	Digital download	Sony Music
Germany	June 17, 2013	Digital download	Sony Music
United States	June 17, 2013	Digital download	Kemosabe Kids; RCA
Italy	June 21, 2013	Mainstream radio	Sony Music
United States	June 25, 2013	CD single (Walmart exclusive)	RCA
United States	June 25, 2013	Mainstream radio	RCA
United Kingdom	July 28, 2013	Digital download	RCA
Germany	August 2, 2013	CD single	Sony Music
China	September 6, 2013	CD single	Sony Music
