= Blow Out (TV series) =

2004 reality television series

- Genre: Reality
- Starring: Jonathan Antin
- Country of origin: United States

Production
- Running time: 60 minutes
- Production companies: Magna Global Entertainment; Reveille Productions; Shapiro/Grodner Productions

Original release
- Network: Bravo
- Release: June 8, 2004 – September 1, 2006

Blow Out is a reality television series that first premiered on the Bravo cable television network in 2004, with a second season broadcasting in 2005. The first season revolved around the construction and launch of Jonathan Salon in Beverly Hills, an upscale Los Angeles hair salon. The second season showed the ongoing business ventures of now celebrity hair stylist Jonathan Antin, including the management of his (two) salons and the launch of his own hair styling product. A third season premiered on March 21, 2006. Season 3 chronicled Jonathan's product launch and growing popularity in the fashion industry.

The Beverly Hills salon, located at 9681 Wilshire Blvd in Beverly Hills, is no longer Antin's and operates under Tom Brophy's Salon as of 2012.
