= Ugly Heart =

Single by G.R.L.

from the album G.R.L.
- Released: June 3, 2014
- Recorded: 2013
- Genre: Dance-pop
- Length: 3:19
- Label: Kemosabe; RCA
- Songwriters: Ryan Baharloo; Ester Dean; Lukasz Gottwald; John Charles Monds; Henry Walter
- Producers: Dr. Luke; Cirkut

G.R.L. singles chronology
"Wild Wild Love" (2014)	"Ugly Heart" (2014)	"Lighthouse" (2015)

Music video
- "Ugly Heart" on YouTube

"Ugly Heart" is the second single by American-British-Canadian girl group G.R.L. from their self-titled album. The song features songwriting credits from Ryan Baharloo, Ester Dean, Lukasz Gottwald, John Charles Monds and Henry Walter, with production credits from Gottwald and Walter under their production monikers, Dr. Luke and Cirkut. The song was released on June 3, 2014, as the lead single from the EP. "Ugly Heart" is a guitar-driven dance-pop song that also incorporates a ukulele.

The track centers on a man who initially appears beautiful on the outside, but later displays his ugly side. The group thought a lot of women would be able to relate to the song and hoped it would inspire them to find someone who would treat them well. The song was met with general acclaim from critics. The song's accompanying music video was directed by Chris Marrs Piliero. It depicts the girls being arrested by the police, after they tattoo the word "ugly" on a man's face (Andrea Denver). It was watched 2.5 million times in less than a week following its release.

"Ugly Heart" was the last single to be released by the group before band member Simone Battle's death on September 5, 2014.

The song received renewed interest in October 2016 when British girl group Little Mix released their lead single "Shout Out to My Ex", from their fourth studio album Glory Days. Some people said that the choruses of the two songs had similarities.

== Background and release ==
Group member Paula Van Oppen explained that "Ugly Heart" was about ending a relationship with a guy who initially appeared to be nice on the outside, but once you got to know him well, the ugly side to his personality came out. Van Oppen said the inspiration for the song "was giving that message of strength and confidence and being a good person, inside and out. Not just having the exterior surface be all that you are." Natasha Slayton hoped the track would inspire people to date someone who treated them well, instead of dating someone because of their beauty. Simone Battle commented that the track felt personal to her, as it reminded her of a time when she had crush on a guy in high school, who pretended to like her back and embarrassed her. Battle also thought there would be a lot of women who could relate to the song. Van Oppen, meanwhile, added that the group's songs were empowering.

The song leaked in March 2014, before it was officially released on June 3, 2014. It was sent to mainstream radio on June 24, 2014. The single's artwork was unveiled the day before the single was released.

== Composition ==
"Ugly Heart" was written by Ryan Baharloo, Ester Dean, Lukasz "Dr. Luke" Gottwald, John Charles Monds, and Henry "Cirkut" Walter. It was produced by Dr. Luke and Cirkut, with Max Martin as executive producer. "Ugly Heart" is a guitar-driven dance-pop song with electronic influences. The song also makes use of a ukulele, which gives it a "country vibe". Battle described "Ugly Heart" as being "really eclectic", while Slayton branded it "a Hawaiian hoedown". During the bridge, Van Oppen talks over strumming guitars, followed by Battle who sings a high note, before the song goes back into the chorus. Alex Kritselis from Bustle.com said the chorus had "a chant-like quality to it" that made it easy sing along with.

== Critical reception ==
"Ugly Heart" received general acclaim from contemporary music critics. A writer from Popjustice branded it a "really quite brilliant song about hot wankers" and gave it a 9 out of 10 rating. The writer believed the song was better than the group's debut and improved their chances of a successful career. Jamieson Cox from Time described the song as "moonlit, guitar-oriented pop" and a "sneering kiss-off" with many "undeniable" features of a Dr. Luke production. He also praised the band members chemistry on the song. Mike Wass from Idolator thought the track was an "irresistible anthem" that left him "hooked" after one listen. He particularly liked the "guitar-pop direction" because it differed from the more dominant charting electro-pop songs. Perez Hilton described the song as infectious, great and awesome. He likened the beginning of "Ugly Heart" to a signature Jason Mraz track and praised the lead vocals.

Homorazzi.com reporter Donovan Pagtakhan named it the group's best song to date and a "catchy pop track with a folk vibe", while Maximum Pop! said the track "feels like a tune you'd pump in your car when riding with your girlfriends. Brad Stern from MTV labeled it a "certifiable, Dr. Luke-produced smash" packed with "chant-along-friendly hooks". Jason Lipshutz from Billboard quipped "the group uncovers the winning pop formula that previous single "Vacation" failed to unlock." Melissa Redman from Renowned for Sound gave "Ugly Heart" three and a half stars out of five. She called the tune "cliche", but thought it had a "catchy appeal" and was a "nice effort from G.R.L" overall. Sugarscape.com's Carl Smith dubbed it an "insanely sassy single". Igee Okafor writing for magazine The Source likened "Ugly Heart" to "up-tempo and high-energy" releases by Ke$ha. They described the ukulele as "infectious" and the vocals as "powerful and impeccable". Billboard named the song #50 on their list of 100 Greatest Girl Group Songs of All Time.

== Commercial performance ==
For the week commencing July 14, 2014, "Ugly Heart" debuted at number 41 on the ARIA Singles Chart in Australia. It reached a peak position of number 2. Ugly Heart also landed at No. 10 on The Australian 2014 Year End charts. The track reached a peak position of number 3 on the Official New Zealand Music Chart. In the United Kingdom, on the week after Battle's death, "Ugly Heart" debuted at number eleven on the UK Singles Chart due to lack of streaming and despite being at number 6 on the sales-only based version of the chart. Although the song did not chart on the Billboard Hot 100, it reached number 7 on the Bubbling Under Hot 100 Singles and has sold over 113,000 copies in the United States.

== Music video ==
Filming for the accompanying music video began on June 9, 2014. The video was directed by Chris Marrs Piliero and shot in downtown Los Angeles. The video opens with each of the girls being escorted from a tattoo parlour by male police officers. While they are getting booked at the police station, the girls begin dancing on the tables and in a cell. They are then taken into a line-up room, where they continue to dance. The focus then turns to a man on the other side of the glass, with tattoos spelling out "ugly" all over his face. As the video ends, Battle says "Now your face is like your heart. Ugly."

The video attracted over 2.5 million views in less than a week following its release. As of January 2021, the music video has been viewed over 100 million times on YouTube. Lucas Villa of ticket merchant AXS branded it a cute video in which "even bad girls just want to have fun".

== Track list ==
Digital download

1. "Ugly Heart" – 3:20

Other version

- Dave Aude club mix – 6:55
- Dave Aude dub – 6:10
- Dave Aude instrumental – 6:55
- Dave Aude radio edit – 4:08
- Wideboys club mix – 6:03
- Wideboys dub – 6:03
- Wideboys radio edit – 3:04

== Live performances ==
The group first performed the song at the iTunes Festival SXSW on March 14, 2014. On May 10, 2014, they performed it at KIIS-FM's Wango Tango. They performed the track at the 2014 Dinah Shore Weekend in Las Vegas. They later performed at the 103.3 AMP Radio "Birthday Bash" in Boston on June 15, 2014. On July 29, 2014, G.R.L. performed an acoustic version of the song for Perez TV. The group's first televised performance of the single was on Sunrise, while they also performed the song on the second live decider of X Factor Australia on August 18, 2014. They performed on Good Morning America on August 20, 2014.

== Charts ==
=== Weekly charts ===
Chart (2014)	Peak position
Australia (ARIA)	2
Belgium (Ultratop 50 Flanders)	21
Belgium (Ultratip Bubbling Under Flanders)	2
Czech Republic Singles Digital (ČNS IFPI)	17
Hungary (Stream Top 40)	29
Iceland (Tónlistinn)	27
Ireland (IRMA)	2
Netherlands (Single Top 100)	84
Netherlands (Single Tip)	1
New Zealand (Recorded Music NZ)	3
Norway (VG-lista)	17
Scottish Singles Sales (Official Charts)	5
Slovakia Singles Digital (ČNS IFPI)	28
Sweden (Sverigetopplistan)	7
UK Singles (Official Charts)	11
US Bubbling Under Hot 100 Singles (Billboard)	7
US Adult Top 40 (Billboard)	32

=== Year-end charts ===
Chart (2014)	Position
Australia (ARIA)	10
Ireland (IRMA)	19
New Zealand (Recorded Music NZ)	21
Sweden (Sverigetopplistan)	88
UK Singles (Official Charts Company)	81

== Certifications ==
Region	Certification	Certified units/sales
Australia (ARIA)	4× Platinum	280,000^{^}
Denmark (IFPI Danmark)	Gold	45,000^{‡}
New Zealand (RMNZ)	3× Platinum	90,000^{‡}
United Kingdom (BPI)	2× Platinum	1,200,000^{‡}
^{^} Shipments figures based on certification alone.^{‡} Sales+streaming figures based on certification alone.

== Release history ==
Country	Date	Format
United States	June 3, 2014	Digital download
United States	June 24, 2014	Mainstream radio
United Kingdom	August 31, 2014	Digital download
