= Party Rock Anthem =

Single by LMFAO featuring Lauren Bennett and GoonRock

from the album Sorry for Party Rocking
- Released: January 25, 2011
- Recorded: 2010
- Genre: Hip house
- Length: 4:23 (main/album version); 3:52 (radio edit 1); 3:27 (radio edit 2)
- Label: will.i.am; Cherrytree; Interscope; Panther
- Songwriters: David Listenbee; Stefan Gordy; Skyler Gordy; Peter Schroeder
- Producers: GoonRock; Redfoo

LMFAO singles chronology
"Gettin' Over You" (2010)	"Party Rock Anthem" (2011)	"Champagne Showers" (2011)

Lauren Bennett singles chronology
"Party Rock Anthem" (2011)	"I Wish I Wish" (2011)

GoonRock singles chronology
"Party Rock Anthem" (2011)	"A Little Party Never Killed Nobody (All We Got)" (2013)

Music video
- "Party Rock Anthem" on YouTube

Audio sample
- file; help

"Party Rock Anthem" is a song by American electronic dance music duo LMFAO featuring English singer Lauren Bennett and American producer GoonRock. It was released as the first single from their second and final studio album Sorry for Party Rocking in 2011.

The single would later peak at number one in 20 countries by late summer of 2011 having the top spot in Australia, Belgium, Brazil, Canada, Denmark, France, Germany, Iceland, Ireland, New Zealand, Switzerland, the United Kingdom and the United States. It also reached the top five in Finland, Italy, Norway, Poland and Sweden. It is the best-selling single of all time in Australia. Worldwide, it was the third best-selling digital single of 2011 with sales of 9.7 million copies. It is the third best-selling digital song in US history. "Party Rock Anthem" is currently ranked Billboard's seventh most successful song of all time. As of 2025, it is one of the 100 most viewed videos on YouTube, with over 2.5 billion views.

"Party Rock Anthem" is a mostly electronic composition. After the song was featured in the 2012 action comedy film 21 Jump Street, the film won the MTV Movie Award for Best Music. The song also won the "Favorite Song" award at the 2012 Kids' Choice Awards.

== Composition ==
"Party Rock Anthem" is composed in the key of F minor at a tempo of 130 beats per minute. It follows a chord progression of Fm-E♭-D♭and has a vocal range from D♭3-A♭4.

== Music video ==
=== Background ===
A music video was released on March 9, 2011, and was produced by the two members of LMFAO, Redfoo and Sky Blu, with the assistance of Shinzo Ai. It was choreographed by, and featured, Quest Crew members Hokuto Konishi, Victor Kim, Ryan Conferido, Steve Terada, Aris Paracuelles, Brian Hirano, and Ryan Feng. The video is a parody of the 2002 horror film 28 Days Later. Lauren Bennett, featured in the song, also appeared in the music video. Director Mickey Finnegan described the concept: "There's been an epidemic, the world has gone crazy, as soon as the song came out, everyone got possessed and all they want to do is to shuffle, everyone is a shuffler." The video features the dancers performing the Melbourne Shuffle, which quickly gained popularity in the United States.

=== Video ===
The music video takes place after the "Sorry for Party Rocking" video. The video's opening caption says that Redfoo and Sky Blu fell into a coma due to excessive party rocking and that their single was released the next day. After the caption "28 DAYS LATER" is seen, Redfoo and Sky Blu are shown in a deserted hospital, waking up from comas in a style similar to that of Jim in the film 28 Days Later. Redfoo and Sky Blu exit the hospital into a deserted street full of litter and abandoned cars. They spot a man with a turtle backpack "shuffling" to their own song before they are quickly grabbed by another man in a dress shirt (Malcolm Goodwin), a parody of Louis from Left 4 Dead, who hides them behind a car and explains to them that ever since their single came out, everyone around the world simply "shuffles" all day long. Mid-conversation, the song begins to play in the street, and the man quickly hands Redfoo and Sky Blu some Beats by Dr. Dre earphones for the purpose of muting the song. Redfoo and Sky Blu insert the earpieces and are told to play along with the song. Soon, the street is filled with "shufflers", including label mate Colette Carr, all dancing to the song. When another young man tries to escape from a building, he is surrounded by the dancers in a style indicative of a zombie horde, before re-emerging with stylish new clothes and shuffling, having been "infected".

Frightened after observing the fate of the other man, Redfoo and Sky Blu begin to dance along with the others, pretending to be infected, too. After the line "No led in our zeppelin", the shot cuts directly to the front of the hospital, which appears similar to the cover of Led Zeppelin's 1975 album Physical Graffiti. This is a nod to the English rock band, whom the duo has cited as a musical influence. Halfway through the video, the previously infected young man dances toward Redfoo and Sky Blu, who look terrified. The video fades to black but quickly opens to a new shot (which pays homage to Michael Jackson's Thriller), in which it becomes apparent that they, too, have become infected, as they sing "Every day I'm shufflin" and dance with the rest of the infected dancers.

For the song's second half, which features Lauren Bennett, the video cuts between the original scene and a nighttime scene at the same location featuring LMFAO, Bennett, the song's co-producer GoonRock, and several background dancers.

The music video for LMFAO's 2012 single "Sorry for Party Rocking" is a prequel to the "Party Rock Anthem" video, taking place immediately prior.

=== Filming location ===
The outdoor scenes of the music video were filmed at Warner Brothers Studios "New York Street" backlot, a five-acre site containing the facades of buildings on individual 'streets', recreating eight different areas of the city.

=== Awards ===
The video won the "Best Video" award at the 7th annual edition of the TRL Awards.

== Chart and sales performance ==
On the chart dating February 12, 2011, "Party Rock Anthem" debuted at number 78 on the Billboard Hot 100. The following week, the single fell off the charts before re-entering nine weeks later at number 88 on the issue dated April 16, 2011. From there, the single steadily climbed up the charts before breaking into the top ten on the chart dating June 4, 2011, becoming the duo's first top ten single. On the chart dating July 16, 2011, the single became the duo's first number-one hit in the US; it remained there for six consecutive weeks. "Rock" spent a total of 29 non-consecutive weeks inside the Hot 100's top 10 being the first song to spend over 25 weeks since OneRepublic's "Apologize" in 2007–2008. The song spent 68 weeks in the chart, which at the time was the third-highest number of weeks in the chart for a song in Billboard Hot 100's history. It topped the seven million downloads mark in the United States in July 2012, becoming the second-fastest song in digital history to reach this plateau – reaching it in 68 weeks, just behind Adele's "Rolling in the Deep" which achieved it in 67 weeks – and the third-biggest selling digital single since Nielsen SoundScan began tracking digital sales in 2003. It has sold 8.3 million copies in the US as of July 2026 and over one million copies in the UK. It is the US's third all-time best-selling digital single.

The song would be the second-best performance song of 2011 and the 29th-best performing song of 2012. "Party Rock Anthem" was the second-best performance song on the Hot 100 in the 2010s decade (behind Mark Ronson and Bruno Mars's 2015 hit "Uptown Funk", which spent 14 weeks at number one.)

The song spent eleven weeks at number one in New Zealand and ten weeks in Australia. In New Zealand, it is the longest-running number-one single since Smashproof's hit single "Brother" in 2009, with over 45,000 copies sold. In Australia, it is the longest-running number-one single since "I Wish I Was a Punk Rocker (With Flowers in My Hair)" by Sandi Thom in 2006 and was the best-selling single of 2011, being certified fifteen times platinum.

== In popular media ==
=== Television, films and video games ===
"Party Rock Anthem" has been used in several TV series, such as in the first episode of Awkward, in the season 3, episode 8 of Glee, in the season 5, episode 12 of Gossip Girl, in season 1, episode 17 of The CW's Supergirl, in the season 3 finale of Parenthood, episode 5 of 2 Broke Girls, in season 4, episode 14 of Parks and Recreation, in the eighth season of So You Think You Can Dance, in the South Park episode "City Sushi", season 15, episode 8 of American Dad!, and the musical new year episode of Pepito Manaloto. It was also used in the opening titles for the Australian reality game show, The Renovators. There is a spoof of the song in the popular YouTube web series Annoying Orange, in the episode titled "Party Rock". The song was also used in a Bat Mitzvah sketch in a Saturday Night Live episode hosted by Channing Tatum, and in Australia's Got Talent 2011, sung by Timomatic. Quest Crew danced to it in the season 6 finale of America's Best Dance Crew. In episode 8 of America's Best Dance Crew's season 7, contestants 8 Flavahz danced to the song. It featured in the trailer for the 2011 Lionsgate film Madea's Big Happy Family and is also heard in the video games Just Dance 3 as well as being sampled for "Make the Party (Don't Stop)" in Just Dance 4, and FIFA Street. The video game Dance Central 2 uses it on the DLC, which was released on February 28, 2012. In World of Warcraft, the dance emote for the male Pandaren is based on this song's choreography. "Party Rock Anthem" is also featured in Konami's latest Dance Dance Revolution arcade game release, Dance Dance Revolution A20. The song was officially included in the "Interscope Mixtape Compilation" music pack for the VR rhythm game Beat Saber. The song was already being added as a custom song, but the Interscope pack contained the full-length song. In Fortnite's game mode Fortnite Festival, the song can be heard and played in its entirety.

=== Advertisements ===
The song has been used in several advertisements, such as the Kia Soul commercial featuring the Kia hamsters, the "2011 Sizzle Preview" commercial which promotes all of The CW's shows, and in a commercial for Virgin America airlines. It also appeared in the 2011 Mofaya Summer promotion by Vodacom South Africa. UK ISP Plusnet used a cover of "Party Rock Anthem" in an advertisement for their broadband and calls services in April 2012. It was also used for the 2012 Big Brother Australia advert, and Toyota in Indonesia has used it for their Toyota Yaris advertisement, Pertamina samples some tune in this song for Enduro Matic Motorcycle Oil commercial. In March 2024, Foxtel used the song in ads for their Hubbl smart tv boxes, albeit with the lyrics changed to “Everybody’s Hubblin”.

=== Other ===
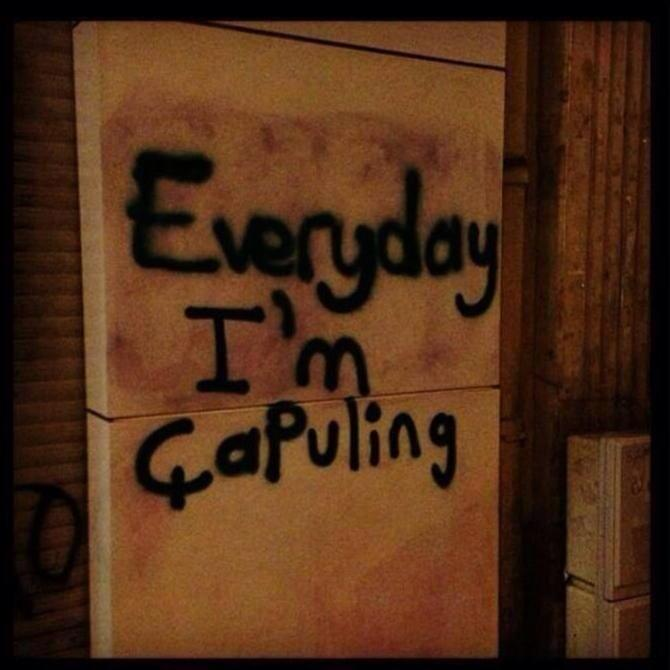
Graffiti from a chapulling day in Turkey, 2013.

Ohio University's marching band, The Marching 110, performed the song during the half-time of a game in October 2011. Their performance was uploaded onto YouTube and went viral.

Canadian radio station HOT 103 from Winnipeg has played a version of the song with modified lyrics that refer to Winnipeg and local sports stars. The Washington Capitals of the NHL uses it for one of its goal songs when the Capitals score. Atlanta Braves second baseman Dan Uggla uses it as his at-bat music. The song was used as the closing chart for the 2012 Jersey Surf Drum & Bugle Corps program. It was also used at the Kellogg's Tour of Gymnastics Champions, with everyone on the tour learning the "shuffle".

During the 2013 public unrest in Turkey, the song was used incorporating the neologism "chapulling", with the chorus being, "Every day I'm chapulling"; a video was made using the protest images uploaded onto YouTube. In Chile, Radio Rock & Pop placed it at number 106 on its list "Rock & Pop 20 Años 200 Canciones".

== Track listings ==
- Digital Download
1. "Party Rock Anthem" – 4:28
- CD single
1. "Party Rock Anthem" (Album Version) – 4:23
2. "Party Rock Anthem" (Audiobot Remix) – 6:01
- Digital radio edit
1. Party Rock Anthem (Radio Edit) – 3:53
- Remixes
1. "Party Rock Anthem" (Audiobot Remix) – 6:01
2. "Party Rock Anthem" (Wideboys Radio Edit) – 3:25
3. "Party Rock Anthem" (Wideboys Club Mix) – 5:49
4. "Party Rock Anthem" (Benny Benassi Radio Edit) – 3:36
5. "Party Rock Anthem" (Benny Benassi Club Mix) – 6:17
6. "Party Rock Anthem" (Christopher Lawrence Radio Edit) – 3:38
7. "Party Rock Anthem" (Christopher Lawrence Club Mix) – 7:11
8. "Party Rock Anthem" (Arion Dubstep Remix) – 3:23
9. "Party Rock Anthem" (Russ Chimes Dub) – 6:25
10. "Party Rock Anthem" (Alesso Remix) – 5:49
11. "Party Rock Anthem" (Avollo Remix) – 6:17
12. "Party Rock Anthem" (DJ Enferno Remix) – 4:51
13. "Party Rock Anthem" (Kim Fai Remix) – 6:53
14. "Party Rock Anthem" (Cherry Cherry Boom Boom Bomber Refreak) - 4:02
15. "Party Rock Anthem" (Millions Like Us Dubstep Remix) – 4:38
16. "Party Rock Anthem" (Alyn's Goin Hard Remix) – 4:20
17. "Party Rock Anthem" (Mt Parahaki Dubstep Remix) – 4:22
18. "Party Rock Anthem" (DJ Bent Dutch Remix) – 5:54
19. "Party Rock Anthem" (Curious Kontrol Dubstep Remix) - 5:34
20. "Party Rock Anthem" (Beatwalker Dubstep Dub) - 4:22
21. "Party Rock Anthem" (BuzZTech Dubstep Remix) - 4:12
22. "Party Rock Anthem" (Team Dubstep Remix) - 3:56
23. "Party Rock Anthem" (RetroVision Remix) - 2:42

== Charts ==
=== Weekly charts ===
Chart (2011–2013)	Peak position
Australia (ARIA)	1
Austria (Ö3 Austria Top 40)	1
Belgium (Ultratop 50 Flanders)	1
Belgium (Ultratop 50 Wallonia)	2
Brazil (Billboard Hot Pop & Popular)	3
Canada Hot 100 (Billboard)	1
Croatia International Airplay (HRT)	3
Czech Republic Airplay (ČNS IFPI)	1
Denmark (Tracklisten)	1
Euro Digital Song Sales (Billboard)	1
Finland (Suomen virallinen lista)	5
France (SNEP)	1
Germany (GfK)	1
Hungary (Dance Top 40)	2
Hungary (Rádiós Top 40)	1
Ireland (IRMA)	1
Italy (FIMI)	5
Italian Airplay (EarOne)	59
Japan (Japan Hot 100)	9
Mexico Anglo (Monitor Latino)	1
Netherlands (Dutch Top 40)	9
Netherlands (Single Top 100)	6
New Zealand (Recorded Music NZ)	1
Norway (VG-lista)	3
Poland Dance (ZPAV)	4
Romania (Romanian Top 100)	43
Russia Airplay (TopHit)	3
Scottish Singles Sales (Official Charts)	1
Slovakia Airplay (ČNS IFPI)	1
South Korea (GAON) (International Chart)	1
Spain (Promusicae)	7
Sweden (Sverigetopplistan)	3
Switzerland (Schweizer Hitparade)	1
UK Singles (Official Charts)	1
Ukraine Airplay (TopHit)	47
US Billboard Hot 100	1
US Adult Pop Airplay (Billboard)	15
US Dance Club Songs (Billboard)	2
US Hot Latin Songs (Billboard)	6
US Hot R&B/Hip-Hop Songs (Billboard)	79
US Hot Rap Songs (Billboard)	4
US Pop Airplay (Billboard)	1
US Rhythmic Airplay (Billboard)	1

Chart (2025)	Peak position
Poland (Polish Airplay Top 100)	62

=== Year-end charts ===
Chart (2011)	Position
Australia (ARIA)	1
Austria (Ö3 Austria Top 40)	6
Belgium (Ultratop Flanders)	4
Belgium (Ultratop Wallonia)	3
Brazil (Crowley)	19
Canada (Canadian Hot 100)	2
Croatia International Airplay (HRT)	16
Denmark (Hitlisten)	9
France (SNEP)	1
Germany (Official German Charts)	8
Hungary (Dance Top 40)	5
Hungary (Rádiós Top 40)	6
Ireland (IRMA)	4
Italy (FIMI)	18
Japan (Japan Hot 100)	55
Netherlands (Dutch Top 40)	19
Netherlands (Single Top 100)	15
New Zealand (RIANZ)	1
Poland (ZPAV)	11
Russia Airplay (TopHit)	20
Spain (PROMUSICAE)	23
Sweden (Sverigetopplistan)	12
Switzerland (Schweizer Hitparade)	7
UK Singles (Official Charts Company)	3
US Billboard Hot 100	2
US Adult Top 40 (Billboard)	49
US Dance Club Songs (Billboard)	13
US Hot Latin Songs (Billboard)	31
US Hot Rap Songs (Billboard)	12
US Mainstream Top 40 (Billboard)	1
US Rhythmic (Billboard)	2

Chart (2012)	Position
Australia (ARIA)	85
Belgium (Ultratop Flanders)	86
Belgium (Ultratop Wallonia)	33
Canada (Canadian Hot 100)	45
France (SNEP)	79
Hungary (Rádiós Top 40)	80
Poland (ZPAV)	30
Russia Airplay (TopHit)	110
Spain Radio (PROMUSICAE)	39
Sweden (Sverigetopplistan)	77
UK Singles (Official Charts Company)	117
US Billboard Hot 100	29

=== Decade-end charts ===
Chart (2010–2019)	Position
Australia (ARIA)	4
US Billboard Hot 100	2

=== All-time charts ===
Chart	Position
UK Singles (Official Charts Company)	74
US Billboard Hot 100	7

== Certifications and sales ==
Region	Certification	Certified units/sales
Australia (ARIA)	15× Platinum	1,050,000^{^}
Belgium (BRMA)	Platinum	30,000^{*}
Brazil (Pro-Música Brasil)	2× Diamond	500,000^{‡}
Canada (Music Canada)	6× Platinum	846,000
Denmark (IFPI Danmark)	Platinum	30,000^{^}
Finland (Musiikkituottajat)	Gold	6,629
France (SNEP)	Platinum	317,000
Germany (BVMI)	2× Platinum	600,000^{‡}
Italy (FIMI)	2× Platinum	60,000^{*}
Japan (RIAJ)	2× Platinum	500,000^{*}
New Zealand (RMNZ)	4× Platinum	60,000^{*}
South Korea	—	2,360,042
Spain (Promusicae)	Platinum	60,000^{‡}
Sweden (GLF)	3× Platinum	120,000^{‡}
Switzerland (IFPI Switzerland)	3× Platinum	90,000^{^}
United Kingdom (BPI)	3× Platinum	1,800,000^{‡}
United States (RIAA)	Diamond	10,000,000^{‡}
Streaming
Denmark (IFPI Danmark)	Platinum	100,000^{†}
^{*} Sales figures based on certification alone.^{^} Shipments figures based on certification alone.^{‡} Sales+streaming figures based on certification alone.^{†} Streaming-only figures based on certification alone.

== Release history ==
Release dates and formats for "Party Rock Anthem"
Region	Date	Format	Label(s)	Ref.
United States	March 22, 2011	Rhythmic airplay	Interscope	
United States	March 29, 2011	Mainstream airplay	Interscope	

== See also ==
- List of best-selling singles in Australia
