= G.R.L. (EP) =

Studio album by G.R.L.
- Released: July 29, 2014
- Recorded: 2013–2014
- Genre: Pop
- Length: 17:16
- Labels: Kemosabe; RCA
- Producers: Cirkut; Dr. Luke (also exec.); Ester Dean; Lukas Hilbert; Max Martin (also exec.); The Suspex

Singles from G.R.L.
- 1. "Ugly Heart" Released: June 3, 2014; 2. "Lighthouse" Released: January 15, 2015

G.R.L. is the debut studio album by American girl group G.R.L., released on July 29, 2014, by Kemosabe Records and RCA Records.

== Background ==
In an interview with PopCrush, the group stated that they are working with Dr. Luke, Max Martin, Cirkut, Darkchild, and Lukas Hilbert for a new album, which is set to release in 2014.

== Promotion ==
Prior to the release of their EP, the group began a monthlong promotional tour on September 10, 2013, in Brooklyn, New York, partnered with Claire's and Westfield Malls meeting fans, visiting radio stations, and performing at select locations.

On March 14, 2014, the group performed at the iTunes Festival at SXSW, opening for Zedd and Pitbull. They performed the songs "Girls Are Always Right", "Show Me What You Got", "Vacation", "Rewind", and "Ugly Heart".

== Singles ==
"Ugly Heart" was released as the lead single on June 3, 2014. It was sent to mainstream radio on June 24, 2014. The music video was directed by Chris Marrs Piliero. It premiered on July 1, 2014.

=== Promotional singles ===
"Show Me What You Got" was released as the first promotional single on February 18, 2014. It is also part of the compilation album Now That's What I Call Music! 49.

== Track listing ==
No.	Title	Writer(s)	Producer(s)	Length
1.	"Ugly Heart"	Ryan Baharloo; Ester Dean; Lukasz Gottwald; John Charles Monds; Henry Walter	Dr. Luke; Cirkut	3:18
2.	"Show Me What You Got"	Gottwald; Jacob Kasher Hindlin; Max Martin; Walter	Dr. Luke; Martin; Cirkut	3:26
3.	"Rewind"	Gottwald; Hindlin; Walter; Martin; Ammar Malik	Dr. Luke; Martin; Cirkut	3:49
4.	"Don't Talk About Love"	Jason Evigan; Mitch Allan; Lindy Robbins; Julia Michaels	The Suspex	3:06
5.	"Girls Are Always Right"	Lukas Loules; Katerina Loules; Emily Harder	Loules	3:37
Total length:				17:16

== Certifications ==
Certifications for G.R.L.
Region	Certification	Certified units/sales
New Zealand (RMNZ)	Gold	7,500^{‡}
^{‡} Sales+streaming figures based on certification alone.
