= Wild Wild Love =

2014 single by Pitbull

Single by Pitbull featuring G.R.L.

from the album Globalization
- Released: February 25, 2014
- Genre: Folk; Electro-hop; pop
- Length: 3:23
- Label: Polo Grounds; Mr. 305; RCA
- Songwriters: Armando C. Pérez; Dr. Luke; Michael Everett; Max Martin; Ammar Malik; Alexander Castillo Vasquez; Henry Walter
- Producers: Dr. Luke; Max Martin; Cirkut; A.C

Pitbull singles chronology
"Mmm Yeah" (2014)	"Wild Wild Love" (2014)	"Can't Get Enough" (2014)

G.R.L. singles chronology
"Vacation" (2013)	"Wild Wild Love" (2014)	"Ugly Heart" (2014)

Music video
- "Wild Wild Love" on YouTube

"Wild Wild Love" is a song by American rapper Pitbull featuring American-Canadian-English girl group G.R.L. The song was released February 25, 2014, and serves as the lead single off of Pitbull's eighth studio album Globalization. It was written by Pitbull, Ammar Malik, Dr. Luke, Max Martin, Alexander Castillo Vasquez, Michael Everett (co-composer), and Henry Walter, with the production handled by the latter five. The song reached the top 10 in the United Kingdom, Australia, and Norway. It is also the last collaboration, to date, between the super-producers Max Martin and Dr. Luke; the duo had extensively been working together since 2004.

== Critical response ==
Mike Wass of Idolator was complimentary of the song describing it as a "killer single". He did label Pitbull's lyrics "questionable" but are overlooked as he "injects enough humor into the song". Steve Adams of the Winnipeg Free Press gave the song a lukewarm review, giving it two and half stars. He wrote that, compared to "Timber", "Wild Wild Love" was not "nearly as gratingly awful, but it's not anything amazing either". Rolling Stone's Joe Gross only commented that Pitbull "doesn't sound entirely sure who [G.R.L.] are".

== Chart performance ==
"Wild Wild Love" peaked at number 30 on the US Billboard Hot 100 chart, making it Pitbull's seventeenth top 40 hit. It peaked at number 6 on the UK, becoming his last top ten hit there. It became G.R.L.'s only single to impact the chart before the group disbanded in 2015. As of March 2015, the single has sold 767,000 copies in the US. The song was also a commercial success in Australia, Belgium, Canada, Finland, New Zealand, Norway, Scotland, Slovakia and Sweden.

== Music video ==
The interior scenes of the music video for "Wild Wild Love" was shot in February 2014 at the Playboy Mansion in Los Angeles, California. The scenes in the second half of the video were done at Viscaya in Miami. The video was first aired on Pitbull's official Facebook page on March 31, 2014.

== Usage in media ==
"Wild Wild Love" was used in the trailer and Big Game Spot of The Secret Life of Pets.

Pitbull's beginning verse was reused for his portion on the official remix of Heidi Montag's "I'll Do It" (2025).

== Charts ==
=== Weekly charts ===
Chart (2014)	Peak position
Australia (ARIA)	10
Belgium (Ultratip Bubbling Under Flanders)	3
Belgium Dance Bubbling Under (Ultratop Flanders)	3
Belgium (Ultratip Bubbling Under Wallonia)	3
Belgium Dance Bubbling Under (Ultratop Wallonia)	2
Canada Hot 100 (Billboard)	22
Canada CHR/Top 40 (Billboard)	17
Finland (Suomen virallinen lista)	13
Finland (Suomen virallinen radiolista)	16
France (SNEP)	90
Hungary (Stream Top 40)	6
Ireland (IRMA)	30
Netherlands (Single Top 100)	87
New Zealand (Recorded Music NZ)	25
Norway (VG-lista)	7
Scottish Singles Sales (Official Charts)	3
Slovakia Airplay (ČNS IFPI)	23
Slovakia Singles Digital (ČNS IFPI)	36
Sweden (Sverigetopplistan)	36
UK Hip Hop/R&B (Official Charts)	2
UK Singles (Official Charts)	6
US Billboard Hot 100	30
US Hot Rap Songs (Billboard)	2
US Pop Airplay (Billboard)	15
US Rhythmic Airplay (Billboard)	29

=== Year-end charts ===
Chart (2014)	Position
Australia (ARIA)	85

== Certifications ==
Region	Certification	Certified units/sales
Australia (ARIA)	Platinum	70,000^{^}
Canada (Music Canada)	Platinum	80,000^{*}
New Zealand (RMNZ)	Gold	7,500^{*}
United Kingdom (BPI)	Silver	200,000^{‡}
United States (RIAA)	Platinum	767,000
Streaming
Denmark (IFPI Danmark)	Gold	900,000^{†}
^{*} Sales figures based on certification alone.^{^} Shipments figures based on certification alone.^{‡} Sales+streaming figures based on certification alone.^{†} Streaming-only figures based on certification alone.

== Release history ==
Country	Date	Format	Label
France	February 25, 2014	Digital download	Polo Grounds; Mr. 305; RCA
Italy	February 25, 2014	Digital download	Polo Grounds; Mr. 305; RCA
Spain	February 25, 2014	Digital download	Polo Grounds; Mr. 305; RCA
United States		Digital download	Polo Grounds; Mr. 305; RCA
United States	March 18, 2014	Contemporary hit radio	Polo Grounds; Mr. 305; RCA
United States	March 18, 2014	Rhythmic radio	Polo Grounds; Mr. 305; RCA
