= The Smurfs 2 =

2013 film by Raja Gosnell

- Theatrical release poster
- Directed by: Raja Gosnell
- Screenplay by: J. David Stem; David N. Weiss; Jay Scherick; David Ronn; Karey Kirkpatrick
- Story by: J. David Stem; David N. Weiss; Jay Scherick; David Ronn
- Based on: The Smurfs by Peyo
- Produced by: Jordan Kerner
- Starring: Neil Patrick Harris; Brendan Gleeson; Jayma Mays; Katy Perry; Hank Azaria
- Cinematography: Phil Méheux
- Edited by: Sabrina Plisco
- Music by: Heitor Pereira
- Production companies: Columbia Pictures; Sony Pictures Animation; Kerner Entertainment Company; Hemisphere Media Capital
- Distributed by: Sony Pictures Releasing
- Release date: July 31, 2013
- Running time: 105 minutes
- Country: United States
- Language: English
- Budget: $105 million
- Box office: $347.5 million

The Smurfs 2 is a 2013 American fantasy comedy film loosely based on the comic book series created by Peyo. Directed by Raja Gosnell and written by J. David Stem, David N. Weiss, Jay Scherick, David Ronn, and Karey Kirkpatrick, it serves as a sequel to The Smurfs (2011), and is the second installment of the Smurfs film series. Neil Patrick Harris, Jayma Mays, Katy Perry, Jonathan Winters, Anton Yelchin, George Lopez, and Hank Azaria reprise their roles from the first film, with Brendan Gleeson, Jacob Tremblay, Christina Ricci, and J. B. Smoove joining the cast.

The Smurfs 2 was released theatrically on July 31, 2013, by Sony Pictures Releasing. Like its predecessor, the film was panned by critics, and wasn't as successful as the original, as it grossed $347.5 million against a $105 million budget. A sequel, The Smurfs 3, was initially planned for a summer 2015 release, but was cancelled in favor of a fully animated reboot, Smurfs: The Lost Village, which was released on April 7, 2017, and directed by Kelly Asbury, with Sony and Kerner returning to produce the film while having a new cast.

== Plot ==
On Smurfette's birthday, the Smurfs read out the story of how she was created by Gargamel to destroy them before Papa Smurf turned her into a true blue Smurf. Smurfette has nightmares about her origin story and becomes unsure of her identity. The Smurfs are planning a surprise party for Smurfette and try to hide the preparations from her, which makes Smurfette believe that everyone has forgotten her birthday.

In Paris, Gargamel and Azrael are now celebrities, amazing people with Gargamel's sorcery, but he is running low on the Smurf essence that gives him his magic powers. With his new creations, evil Smurf-like creatures called the Naughties, named Vexy and Hackus, Gargamel creates a portal to Smurf Village by using the Eiffel Tower as a conduit so that he can kidnap Smurfette to obtain Papa's secret formula for creating Smurfs. Gargamel is too large to go through the portal, so he sends Vexy through it to kidnap Smurfette.

The Smurfs witness the abduction of Smurfette and inform Papa, who uses his magic to create crystals that allow whatever Smurf that swallows them to travel directly to the residence of their human allies, Patrick and Grace Winslow, in New York City in order to seek their help to rescue Smurfette. Papa originally intends for Brainy, Hefty, and Gutsy to use the crystals, but then Clumsy accidentally bumps into him and causes the crystals into fly into the mouths of the wrong smurfs, sending Grouchy, Vanity and himself to New York to help Papa instead. The Smurfs arrive to Patrick and Grace's apartment right after their son Blue's fourth birthday party where they also meet Patrick's stepfather, Victor Doyle. The Smurfs learn that Gargamel is in Paris and set off with the Winslows and Victor to find him.

Upon arrival in Paris, Patrick and Victor distract Gargamel during one of his performances at the Palais Garnier, but Gargamel accidentally turns Victor into a duck. Meanwhile, the Smurfs sneak backstage in Gargamel's dressing room to look for Smurfette, only to discover what Gargamel is planning. At the same time, Smurfette escapes from her prison, and the Naughties chase after her. Vexy encourages Smurfette to be naughty for fun to get her on their side, and, in the process, the three of them truly befriend each other.

Upon their return to Gargamel's hotel suite, Gargamel presents Smurfette with a tiny dragon wand as a feigned act of kindness. Smurfette still refuses to give Gargamel the formula until she sees the Naughties are dying due to a lack of Smurf essence. Faced without an alternative to save them, Smurfette writes the formula down and Gargamel uses it to turn the Naughties into real Smurfs. Immediately after they become Smurfs, Gargamel puts them into his Smurfalator machine to extract their essence.

Meanwhile, Patrick, Victor, who is human again because Gargamel's spell was only temporary, and the Smurfs work together to rescue Smurfette. The Smurfs are soon captured and put into the Smurfalator, powering Gargamel's large-sized dragon wand. Patrick and Victor arrive just in time to destroy the Smurfalator together, causing an explosion of Smurf essence that destroys the written formula and frees the Smurfs from their cages. Everyone is blasted out of Gargamel's lair through a sewer hole where Patrick and Victor reunite with Grace and Blue. Gargamel reappears but is blasted away by Smurfette with her new wand. He then falls onto the Notre Dame Cathedral, where he accidentally brings a stone gargoyle to life, which then throws him to the top of the Eiffel Tower and blasted into the air by fireworks. The Smurfs bid farewell to the Winslows, then return home with Vexy and Hackus to celebrate Smurfette's birthday.

In two post-credit sequences, Gargamel and Azrael create a portal, sending them back to their castle, and they later have a fight.

== Cast ==
- Katy Perry as Smurfette
- Christina Ricci as Vexy, a mischievous smurf-look-a-like naughtie created by Gargamel who is Hackus' sister and later Grouchy's love interest
  - Britney Spears as her uncredited singing voice during the "Ooh La La" song at the end credits scene.
- J. B. Smoove as Hackus, a dim-witted and gluttonous smurf-look-a-like naughtie created by Gargamel who is Vexy's brother
- Hank Azaria as Gargamel, an evil wizard, and the archenemy of the Smurfs
- Jonathan Winters as Papa Smurf
- Neil Patrick Harris as Patrick Winslow, Grace's husband, Victor's step-son, and Blue's father.
- Brendan Gleeson as Victor Doyle, Patrick's step-father, Grace's step-father-in-law, and Blue's step-grandfather
- Jayma Mays as Grace Winslow, Patrick's wife, Victor's step-daughter-in-law, and Blue's mother
- George Lopez as Grouchy Smurf
- Anton Yelchin as Clumsy Smurf
- John Oliver as Vanity Smurf
- Jacob Tremblay as Blue Winslow, Patrick and Grace's son, and Victor's step-grandson
- Fred Armisen as Brainy Smurf
- Jeff Foxworthy as Handy Smurf
- Alan Cumming as Gutsy Smurf
- Gary Basaraba as Hefty Smurf
- Adam Wylie as Panicky Smurf
- Joel McCrary as Farmer Smurf
- Kenan Thompson as Greedy Smurf
- Kevin Lee as Party Planner Smurf
- Paul Reubens as Jokey Smurf
- Shaquille O'Neal as Smooth Smurf
- B. J. Novak as Baker Smurf
- Jimmy Kimmel as Passive Aggressive Smurf
- Shaun White as Clueless Smurf
- Mario Lopez as Social Smurf
- John Kassir as Crazy Smurf
- Tom Kane as Narrator Smurf
- Mr. Krinkle, Cheeto, and FG as Azrael, Gargamel's cat. Cheeto and FG were uncredited for their roles. Frank Welker provides his voice.
- Nancy O'Dell as herself, a television interviewer

== Production ==
On August 9, 2011, Sony Pictures Animation announced a sequel to be released on August 2, 2013, which was later rescheduled to July 31, 2013 (two years and two days after the release of its predecessor). Director Raja Gosnell and producer Jordan Kerner returned for the film. Katy Perry confirmed at the 2012 Kids' Choice Awards that she would be reprising her role as Smurfette. Sony began working on the sequel in early 2011 with writers J. David Stem, David N. Weiss, Jay Scherick and David Ronn. By early August 2011, the first draft of the script was completed. On April 26, 2012, Sony announced that the film went into production. Filming took place in Paris, France. The film also marked the last appearance of Jonathan Winters, who voiced Grandpa Smurf in the 1980s TV series and Papa Smurf in the first film. The film was dedicated to Winters, who died before its release.

On July 11, 2013, it was announced that Sofía Vergara's role was cut from the film. Gosnell, the director of the film, explained: "She came to Paris and did a tiny little cameo for us, but ultimately for story clarity we had to omit that scene. ... It just muddied things up a bit. So it was a sad day for us, but she'll always be part of our Smurfy family." Several scenes were filmed in the new film studios Cité du Cinéma founded by Luc Besson in Saint-Denis in France.

== Release ==
The film was theatrically released in the United States on July 31, 2013. Sony teamed up with marketing partners in the United States and Canada to promote the film through McDonald's Happy Meals with a set of 16 toys during the summer of 2013. Sony also teamed up with Build-A-Bear Workshop to release three customized limited edition stuffed animals of Vexy, Hackus and Smurfette. NASCAR's Ryan Newman drove a Smurfs 2 paint scheme and won the Brickyard 400 in promotion of the film.

=== Home media ===
The Smurfs 2 was released on DVD, Blu-ray Disc and Blu-ray 3D on December 3, 2013, by Sony Pictures Home Entertainment. The 3D and Blu-ray combo packs also included a hand-drawn/computer-animated short film, The Smurfs: The Legend of Smurfy Hollow. The film was released on Ultra HD Blu-ray on March 1, 2016.

In April 2021, Sony signed a deal giving Disney access to their legacy content to stream on Disney+ and Hulu and appear on Disney's linear television networks. Disney's access to Sony's titles would come following their availability on Netflix.

== Reception ==
=== Critical response ===
On Rotten Tomatoes, the film has a 14% approval rating with an average rating of 4.1/10, based on 92 reviews. The website's consensus reads, "Like its predecessor, Smurfs 2 may amuse small children, but it's largely an unambitious, charm-free collection of slapstick gags and one-liners." The rating put the film as the 16th on the list of worst reviewed films of 2013. Metacritic calculated a weighted average score of 34 out of 100 based on 30 critics, indicating "generally unfavorable reviews". Audiences polled by CinemaScore gave the film an average grade of "A−" on an A+ to F scale. The Smurfs 2 was nominated for a Golden Raspberry Award for Worst Prequel, Remake, Rip-off or Sequel.

Justin Lowe of The Hollywood Reporter said "Beyond a few chuckle-worthy one-liners and some amusing visual comedy, there's not much to engage adults, although the wee ones should be distracted enough." Matt Patches of Time Out New York gave the film two out of five stars, saying "Patient Adult Smurfs will be checking their watches as Excitable Child Smurfs lose themselves in the high jinks." Frank Lovece of Newsday gave the film two out of four stars, saying "Not Smurftastic, but not Smurfawful, either." Loren King of The Boston Globe gave the film two out of four stars, saying "That the mushroom- dwelling blue creatures still manage to be endearing even in their second big-screen extravaganza (in 3-D, no less) is about the best that can be said of "Smurfs 2."

Joe Williams of the St. Louis Post-Dispatch said "It's not exactly "Ratatouille," but this quasi-animated movie makes an amusing late-summer vacation from superheroes and shoot-'em-ups." Gregg Turkington of On Cinema gave the film five bags of popcorn, suggesting Jonathan Winters deserved an Oscar for the film and that it was the best performance of his career.

Other reviews were more agnostic regarding the film's quality. Mark Olsen of the Los Angeles Times gave the film two and a half stars out of five, saying "Right down to the brute functionality of its title, "The Smurfs 2" may be the platonic ideal of a major studio sequel - no markedly better or worse than the first and with just enough difference to lay claim to being something new."

Claudia Puig of USA Today gave the film one and a half stars out of four, saying "This insipid, and sometimes awkward, blend of animation, computer generation and live action wastes a ton of talent and lacks a true sense of whimsy." Jordan Hoffman of the New York Daily News gave the film two out of five stars, saying "Voicing Papa Smurf here turned out, alas, to be comedian Jonathan Winters' final role. (A crueler fate than Orson Welles signing off with 1986's animated "The Transformers: The Movie"? You be the judge.)" Alonso Duralde of The Wrap said "The Smurfs 2 will keep a child reasonably entertained for 105 minutes—but so will a large, empty cardboard box. The box is more likely to stimulate a child's imagination and less likely to contain jokes about testicles." Peter Howell of the Toronto Star gave the film one and a half stars out of four, saying "The Smurfs 2 has everything you hated about the first movie, and more."

Sean O'Connell of The Washington Post gave the film two out of five stars, saying "I found "The Smurfs 2" to be more enjoyable and far less obnoxious than [the original]. This, of course, is like saying having a cavity filled is preferable to a root canal, but in the dog days of the summer blockbuster season, beggars can't be smurfers." Peter Hartlaub of the San Francisco Chronicle gave the film zero stars out of four, saying "There's a dark and gratuitously negative vibe to "The Smurfs 2" that makes it unfit even for the undiscriminating young moviegoers that made the first one a hit." Bill Goodykoontz of The Arizona Republic gave the film two out of five stars, saying "There are a few laughs here and there, along with a couple of jokes for grown-ups uncomfortably squeezed in. But this is a movie made for two groups: small children and people who have fond memories of the TV show. For them, it'll be fun, and the assurance of a third "Smurfs" scheduled for 2015 will be welcome news." Nick Schager of The Village Voice said "Its tolerant messages remain buried beneath lame pop-culture references, hectic slapstick, fart jokes, and endless Smurf-puns that (Azaria's funny, over-the-top cartoon villainy aside) make one pine for the Smurfpocalypse."

Neil Genzlinger of The New York Times gave the film two out of five stars, saying "The movie doesn't have the wit of the first installment and seems as if it might be hard for young children to follow, though who knows with young children?" Owen Gleiberman of Entertainment Weekly gave the film a C, saying "The trouble with this stunted sequel is that the doughy, blobby-hatted Smurfs are mostly window dressing for an abrasive slapstick bash built around a tiresome kidnap plot." Bruce Ingram of the Chicago Sun-Times gave the film two out of five stars, saying "The Smurfs 2 probably isn't any worse than you might expect. On the other hand, it's almost certainly not any better. It's just a matter of figuring out how much punishment you're willing to endure for the sake of the small child you're taking to the movies." Kevin McFarland of The A.V. Club gave the film a D+, saying "The film undermines its rudimentary plot points at every turn with base humor. By marginally addressing the Smurfette Problem, Smurfs 2 is at least slightly superior to the absolutely dire first film, but it remains a series for kids whose parents can't just pop in a DVD of something better."

Simon Abrams of RogerEbert.com gave the film an unfavorable review, awarding it half a star out of four. He described the film as a "charmless endurance test" and a film that "could have been played by anybody".

=== Box office ===
The Smurfs 2 grossed $71,017,784 in North America, and $276,527,576 in other countries, for a worldwide total of $347,545,360. Box Office Mojo values the film's budget at $105 million, while Deadline Hollywood reported that the film's negative cost was $146 million, with $21 million gained from the production benefits. Earning $200 million less than its predecessor, the film did not meet Sony's expectation, which was generally attributed to the original's negative reception and competition from another family sequel, Despicable Me 2.

In North America, the film debuted at #1 on its opening day, earning $5.2 million. The film opened to #3 in its first weekend, behind 2 Guns and The Wolverine, earning $18.2 million. Over its extended five-day weekend, it earned $27.8 million, below the original's three-day weekend ($35.6 million), and below Sony's projection of $35 million, which the studio blamed on too many PG-rated films in theatres.

Outside North America, the film debuted with $52.5 million from 43 countries. In Russia and Latin America, it performed better than the first film, while in Europe, it under-performed.

== Music ==
=== Soundtrack ===
The Smurfs 2: Music from and Inspired By

Soundtrack album by Various Artists
- Released: July 23, 2013
- Recorded: 2013
- Genre: Children's music
- Length: 33:55
- Label: Kemosabe
- Producer: Dr. Luke

Singles from The Smurfs 2: Music from and Inspired By
- 1. "Ooh La La" Released: June 12, 2013; 2. "Vacation" Released: June 18, 2013

The Smurfs 2: Music from and Inspired By, the soundtrack of the film, was released on July 23, 2013. Britney Spears contributed an original song titled "Ooh La La", which is played at the film's credits. Many other artists were featured on the soundtrack, including Becky G, Owl City, Nelly Furtado, Austin Mahone, and G.R.L.

No.	Title	Artist(s)	Length
1.	"Ooh La La"	Britney Spears	4:14
2.	"Vacation"	G.R.L.	3:36
3.	"Magik 2.0"	Becky G featuring Austin Mahone	3:05
4.	"Live It Up"	Owl City	2:57
5.	"Walking on Sunshine"	Emblem3	3:26
6.	"Forget You"	Cady Groves	3:46
7.	"Hey Chica"	Kiana Brown	3:17
8.	"High Life"	Nelly Furtado featuring Ace Primo	4:19
9.	"Tutti Frutti"	Buckwheat Zydeco	2:29
10.	"I'm Too Smurfy"	Right Said Fred	2:46
Total length:			33:55

=== Score ===
The Smurfs 2

Film score by Heitor Pereira
- Released: August 6, 2013
- Recorded: 2013
- Genre: Score
- Length: 47:05
- Label: Varèse Sarabande
- Producer: Heitor Pereira

Heitor Pereira film scores chronology
Despicable Me 2 (2013)	The Smurfs 2 (2013)	Minions (2015)

The Smurfs 2 is the score of the film. Heitor Pereira composed the original score for the film with the Hollywood Studio Symphony, which was released on August 6, 2013, by Varèse Sarabande Records.

No.	Title	Length
1.	"Smurfette's Creation" (Includes Smurfs Main Theme by William Hanna, Joseph Barbera and Hoyt Curtin)	1:23
2.	"Smurfette, Are You OK?"	1:00
3.	"You Belong to Gargamel"	0:37
4.	"Gargamel Suite"	1:44
5.	"Azrael's Trap"	0:50
6.	"Code Blue"	1:25
7.	"Victor's Corndogs"	1:33
8.	"We Must Review My Plan"	1:22
9.	"Adoring Public Desires Me"	0:40
10.	"Smurf Portation Crystals"	2:01
11.	"Attack on Winslow House"	1:36
12.	"Madame Doolittle"	0:50
13.	"Paris Opera House"	0:34
14.	"Scoping Out the Kitchen"	1:00
15.	"Smurfette Escapes"	0:51
16.	"Hand Over the Smurfette"	1:29
17.	"Portrait of Perfection"	1:52
18.	"Smurfette on the Run"	0:57
19.	"Gargamel and Azrael in Carriage"	1:07
20.	"Naughties Crash the Cart"	1:03
21.	"Naughties Take Flight"	0:31
22.	"He's Not My Father"	2:04
23.	"The Napoleon Suite"	1:15
24.	"Like Twins"	0:38
25.	"Tiny Magical Wand"	2:08
26.	"The Flying V"	0:29
27.	"Papa to Papa"	1:49
28.	"Let's Get Smurfin'"	1:02
29.	"They Cannot Live"	1:14
30.	"The Formula"	0:46
31.	"Naughties Transformation"	1:11
32.	"You Sacrificed Everything"	0:44
33.	"The Happiest Moment of My Life"	0:50
34.	"Papa and Vanity Find Smurfette"	0:45
35.	"Harnessing the Power"	0:28
36.	"Life Is the Most Precious"	1:20
37.	"I Don't Think So, Gargamel"	0:32
38.	"Essence in Paris"	1:00
39.	"Is This What Happy Feels Like?"	1:34
40.	"No Smurf Left Behind" (Includes Smurfs Main Theme by William Hanna, Joseph Barbera and Hoyt Curtin)	1:50
41.	"Welcome Home, Smurfette" (Includes Smurfs Main Theme by William Hanna, Joseph Barbera and Hoyt Curtin)	1:01
Total length:		47:05

The Japanese release has a song called "Hitomi no Tobira" by AKB48's Minami Takahashi, the dub actress for Smurfette.

== Video game ==
A video game based on the film, titled The Smurfs 2, was published by Ubisoft on July 23, 2013. Developed by Ubisoft Osaka (DS version only) and WayForward Technologies, it was released as an action-adventure platformer to Xbox 360, PlayStation 3, Wii and Wii U, and as an interactive storytelling book and collection of mini-games to Nintendo DS.

== Future ==
=== Cancelled sequel ===
By May 2012, just a few weeks after production of The Smurfs 2 was announced, Sony Pictures Animation and Columbia Pictures had been already developing a script for The Smurfs 3, with writers Karey Kirkpatrick and Chris Poche. Initially set for a release in summer 2015, Sony announced in March 2014 that plans for The Smurfs 3 had been cancelled and instead, it would reboot the series with a completely computer-animated film.

=== Reboot ===
Directed by Kelly Asbury, the reboot titled Smurfs: The Lost Village, was released on April 7, 2017, to mixed reviews, but was seen by both critics and audiences as an improvement over the live action films.
