= Kemosabe Records =

American record label

- Parent company: Sony Music Entertainment
- Founded: November 2011; 14 years ago
- Founder: Dr. Luke
- Distributors: Various (Note: Kemosabe Records is a joint venture between Kemosabe and Sony Music Entertainment, giving the label the power to sign an artist to a joint venture deal with the label and any other label under Sony.); (in the US); Sony Music Entertainment; (outside the US)
- Genre: Various
- Country of origin: United States
- Location: Los Angeles, California
- Official website: kemosaberecords.com

Kemosabe Records is an American record label founded by record producer Dr. Luke in 2011. It was launched as an imprint of RCA Records, a division of Sony Music Entertainment. Based in Los Angeles, California, the label has signed acts including Doja Cat, Kesha, Becky G, Juicy J, R. City, Lil Bibby, G.R.L., LunchMoney Lewis, and Yelle.

== History ==
In November 2011, Sony Music Entertainment announced a partnership with American record producer and songwriter Lukasz "Dr. Luke" Gottwald to launch his record label Kemosabe Records. The label jointly signs their artists with various labels under Sony, most predominantly RCA Records for their U.S. based artists. Gottwald was given the rights to hire his own staff, sign artists and develop talent, but he was only able to produce records for Sony artists until 2016. In April 2017, Sony distanced itself from the producer after singer Kesha accused him of rape. On the RCA and Sony Music's Website, Kemosabe has also been removed from the "Labels" list, and the "Facts and Figures" page on Sony's website.

== Notable artists ==
=== Current ===
- Doja Cat (joint U.S. record deal with RCA Records)

=== Former ===
- Juicy J (joint U.S. record deal with Columbia Records)
- Yelle (joint French record deal with Sony Music & Because Music)
- LunchMoney Lewis (joint U.S. record deal with Columbia Records)
- G.R.L. (joint U.S. record deal with RCA Records)
- Bonnie McKee (joint U.S. record deal with Epic Records)
- Lil Bibby (joint U.S. record deal with RCA Records)
- Elliphant (joint Swedish record deal with Sony Music & TEN Music Group)
- R. City (joint U.S. record deal with RCA Records)
- Paper Route (joint U.S. record deal with Sony Music)
- Kesha (joint U.S. record deal with RCA Records)
- Becky G (joint U.S. record deal with RCA Records)
- Sophia Black (joint U.S. record deal with RCA Records)

== Discography ==
- Kesha – Warrior (December 4, 2012)
- Kesha – Deconstructed (February 5, 2013)
- Becky G – Play It Again (July 16, 2013)
- Various Artists – Music from and Inspired by The Smurfs 2 (July 23, 2013)
- Juicy J – Stay Trippy (August 27, 2013)
- Elliphant – Look Like You Love It (April 1, 2014)
- G.R.L. – G.R.L. (July 29, 2014)
- Christian Burghardt – Safe Place To Land (September 9, 2014)
- Yelle – Complètement fou (September 29, 2014)
- Doja Cat – Purrr! (August 5, 2014)
- Elliphant – One More (October 13, 2014)
- LunchMoney Lewis – Bills (April 21, 2015)
- Yelle – Complètement fou (Remix) (July 24, 2015)
- R. City – What Dreams Are Made Of (October 9, 2015)
- Elliphant – Living Life Golden (March 25, 2016)
- Paper Route – Real Emotion (September 23, 2016)
- Lil Bibby – FC3: The Epilogue (March 8, 2017)
- Kesha – Rainbow (August 11, 2017)
- Juicy J – Rubba Band Business (December 8, 2017)
- Doja Cat – Amala (March 30, 2018)
- Becky G - Mala Santa (October 17, 2019)
- Doja Cat – Hot Pink (November 7, 2019)
- Kesha – High Road (January 31, 2020)
- Doja Cat – Planet Her (June 25, 2021)
- Becky G – Esquemas (May 13, 2022)
- Kesha – Gag Order (May 19, 2023)
- Doja Cat – Scarlet (September 22, 2023)
- Becky G – Esquinas (September 28, 2023)
- Becky G – Encuentros (October 10, 2024)
- Doja Cat – Vie (September 26, 2025)

== See also ==
- Ke-mo sah-bee
