= Girlicious discography =

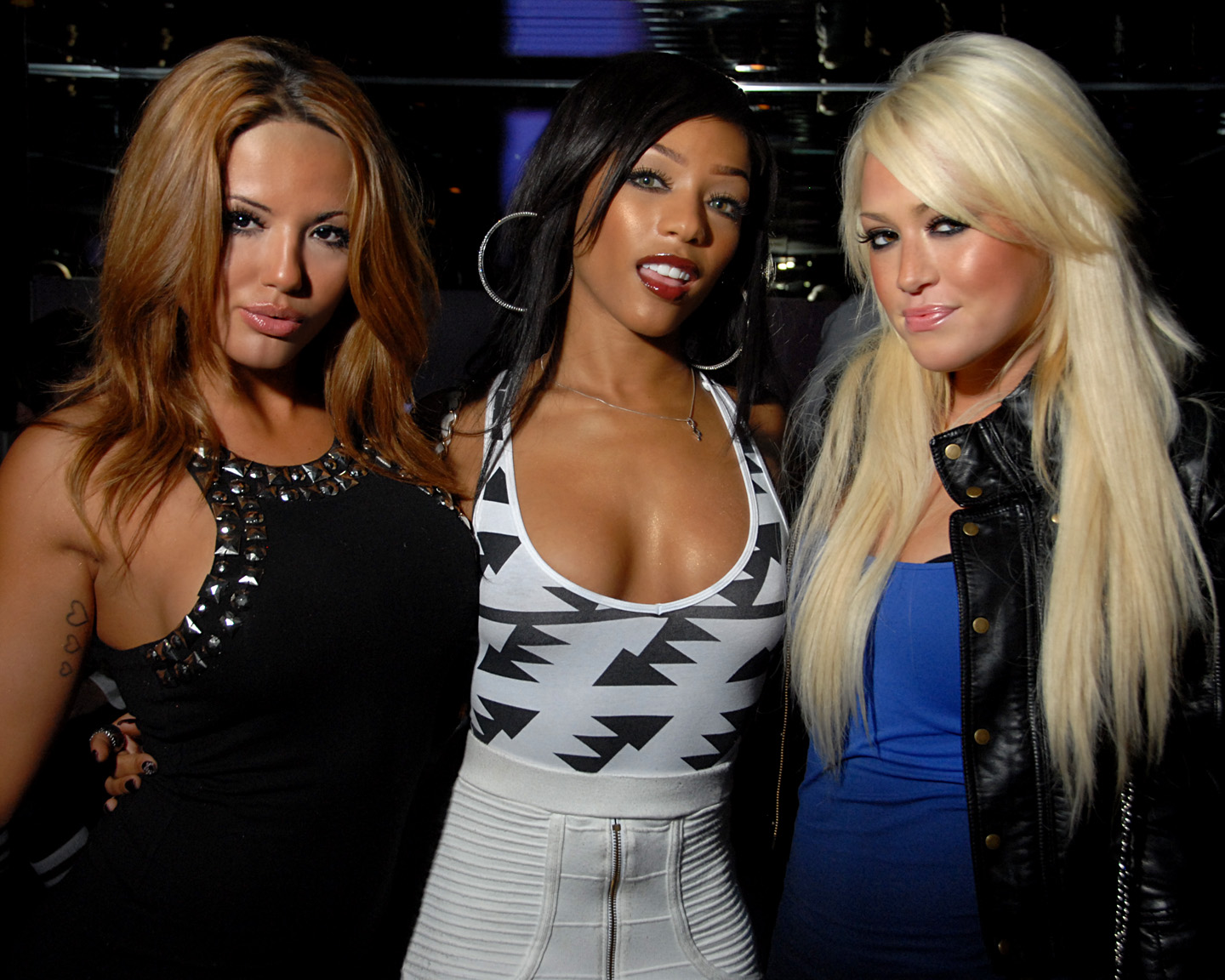
- Girlicious in October 2009
- Studio albums: 2
- Singles: 6
- Music videos: 4

The discography of American girl group Girlicious consists of two studio albums, six singles, one promotional single, and four music videos. Their self-titled debut album was released in Canada in August 2008 and later re-released as a deluxe edition in December 2008. The album achieved commercial success in the country after reaching number two on the Canadian Albums Chart, and later being certified platinum for over 80,000 copies sold. The album spawned three singles: "Like Me", "Stupid Shit", and "Baby Doll". The singles achieved chart success on the Canadian Hot 100, reaching the peaks of four, twenty, and fifty-five, respectively.

The group's second and final studio album, Rebuilt, was released on November 22, 2010 via Universal Music Canada. The album's lead single, titled "Over You", reached number fifty-two on the Canadian Hot 100. The group released a second single from the album, "Maniac", which peaked at number seventy-four. "2 in the Morning" was released as the album's third and final single and peaked at number thirty-five. In 2011, the group disbanded for unknown reasons.

== Studio albums ==
List of studio albums, with selected chart positions and certifications
Title	Studio album details	Peak chart positions	Certifications
Title	Studio album details	CAN	Certifications
Girlicious	Released: August 12, 2008; Label: Geffen; Formats: CD, digital download	2	MC: Platinum
Rebuilt	Released: November 22, 2010; Label: Universal Music Canada; Formats: CD, digital download	86	

== Singles ==
List of singles, showing selected chart positions and certifications
Title	Year	Peak chart positions		Certifications	Album
Title	Year	US Bubb. Under	CAN	Certifications	Album
"Like Me"	2008	2	4	MC: Gold (Note: "Like Me" and "Stupid Shit" were certified together in Canada.)	Girlicious
"Stupid Shit"	2008	—	20	MC: Gold	Girlicious
"Baby Doll"	2008	—	55		Girlicious
"Over You"	2010	—	52		Rebuilt
"Maniac"	2010	—	74		Rebuilt
"2 in the Morning"	2010	—	35		Rebuilt
"Hate Love"	2011	—	59		Rebuilt
"—" denotes items which did not chart in that country.

=== Promotional singles ===
List of promotional singles, showing year released and album name
Title	Year	Album
"Drank" (featuring Spose)	2010	Jersey Shore Soundtrack and Rebuilt

=== Other charted songs ===
List of songs, with selected chart positions, showing year released and album name
Title	Year	Peak chart positions	Album
Title	Year	CAN	Album
"Liar Liar" (featuring Flo Rida)	2008	43	Girlicious
"Still in Love" (featuring Sean Kingston)	2008	99	Girlicious

== Music videos ==
List of music videos, showing year released and director
Title	Year	Director
"Like Me"	2008	Steve Antin
"Stupid Shit"	2008	Robin Antin and Mikey Minden
"Baby Doll"	2008	Matt McDermitt
"Maniac"	2010	Kyle Davison

=== Guest appearances ===
List of music videos, showing year released, artist, and director
Title	Year	Artist	Director
"Fantasy"	2008	Danny Fernandes	RT!
