= The Girlicious Tour =

2008–09 concert tour by Girlicious

- Tour by Girlicious
- Location: Canada
- Associated album: Girlicious
- Start date: October 15, 2008
- End date: August 2, 2009
- Legs: 3
- No. of shows: 33

Girlicious took part in a tour of Canada as the opening act of the Unbreakable Tour with the Backstreet Boys that started on July 30, 2008 and ended September 6, 2008. Girlicious returned to Canada to tour for the second time in 2008, with special guest Danny Fernandes; thus began the Girlicious Tour.

The first set date was scheduled in Fredericton on October 15. Girlicious wrapped up their tour in Canada with Danny Fernandes at the beginning of November 2008 for the first leg. Girlicious started the second leg on March 5 and ending March 29. Danny Fernandes also Opened for them on the second leg as well.

== Additional notes ==
- In May 2009 they performed as a supporting act for The Circus Starring Britney Spears in Montreal Instead of the Pussycat Dolls.
- They added a 2nd show on the same day for Yellowknife, Northwest Territory, Prince Albert, Saskatchewan and Sarnia, Ontario.

== Set list ==
First headlining detlist (North America)
- "Stupid Shit"
- "Baby Doll"
- "I.O.U.1"
- "Save the World"
- "Here I Am"
- "Still in Love"
- "Liar Liar"
- "Like Me"
Opening act setlist and second headlining setlist (North America)
- "Intro Mix"
- "Baby Doll"
- "I.O.U.1"
- "Do About It"
- "Save the World"
- "My Boo"
- "Still in Love"
- "Stupid Shit"
- "Liar Liar"
- "Like Me"
Club Summer Tour 2009 (Canada)
- "Baby Doll"
- "I.O.U.1"
- "Do About It"
- "Stupid Shit"
- "Liar Liar"
- "Like Me"

== Opening acts ==
- Danny Fernandes (North America) (parts 1 and 2)
- Rosette (Vancouver) (part 3)
- Elise Estrada (Winnipeg) (part 3)

== Tour dates ==
Date	City	Country	Venue
First leg
October 15, 2008	Fredericton	Canada	Sub Ballroom
October 16, 2008	Saint John	Canada	Saint John High School; Dennis Knibb Auditorium
October 17, 2008	Charlottetown	Canada	Charlottetown Civic Center
October 18, 2008	Gatineau	Canada	Loft 455
October 20, 2008	Thunder Bay	Canada	Rockhouse Nightclub
October 21, 2008	Winnipeg	Canada	Pantages Playhouse Theatre
October 22, 2008	Brandon	Canada	Keystone Centre
October 23, 2008	Calgary	Canada	Cowboys Nightclub
October 25, 2008	Lloydminster	Canada	The Kooler Night club
October 27, 2008	Saskatoon	Canada	Credit Union Centre
October 28, 2008	Castlegar	Canada	Element Nightclub
October 30, 2008	Vancouver	Canada	Fabric Night Club
November 1, 2008	Medicine Hat	Canada	Doghouse
November 7, 2008	Montreal	Canada	Seven Night Club
Second leg
March 5, 2009	Victoria	Canada	Victoria Memorial Arena
March 6, 2009	Duncan	Canada	Cowichan Community Centre
March 7, 2009	Kelowna	Canada	Prospera Place
March 11, 2009	Grande Prairie	Canada	Canada Games Arena
March 12, 2009 (2 shows)	Yellowknife	Canada	DND Gym - Yellowknife Multiplex
March 13, 2009	Lloydminster	Canada	The Kooler Night club
March 14, 2009	Cold Lake	Canada	Grand Centre
March 17, 2009 (2 shows)	Prince Albert	Canada	Art Hauser Centre
March 18, 2009	Red Deer	Canada	Red Deer Memorial Centre
March 19, 2009	Calgary	Canada	Cowboys Nightclub
March 20, 2009	Slave Lake	Canada	The Sarrige Ball Room
March 21, 2009	Edmonton	Canada	Edmonton Events Centre
March 29, 2009 (2 shows)	Sarnia	Canada	The Stubborn Mule
Third leg
July 23, 2009	Oshawa	Canada	The Big Sexy Night Club
July 25, 2009	Halifax	Canada	Z103.5's Summer Rush
July 26, 2009	Vancouver	Canada	Gossip Nightclub
July 28, 2009	Winnipeg	Canada	Blush Ultraclub
July 30, 2009	Wasaga Beach	Canada	The Dome
July 31, 2009	Grand Bend	Canada	Grand Bend Motorplex
August 1, 2009	Montreal	Canada	Tonic Club Lounge
August 2, 2009	Ottawa	Canada	Mansion Night Club

=== Box office data ===
Venue	City	Tickets sold / available
Charlottetown Civic Centre	Charlottetown	3,718 / 3,718 (100%)
Air Canada Centre	Toronto	37,912 / 37,912 (100%)
Bell Centre	Montreal	21,234 / 21,234 (100%)
Copps Coliseum	Hamilton	16,629 / 16,629 (100%)
Scotiabank Place	Ottawa	15,883 / 15,883 (100%)
