= Melissa Molinaro =

Canadian-American singer and actress (born 1982)

- Born: Melissa Ann Smith; June 4, 1982 (age 44); Whitby, Ontario, Canada
- Other names: Melissa Smith, Melissa S.
- Occupations: Singer; actress; dancer; choreographer; model
- Years active: 2000–present
- Spouse: Bryan Kowalski (m. 2016)
- Children: 2

Melissa Smith (born June 4, 1982), known professionally as Melissa Molinaro, is a Canadian-American pop singer, actress, dancer, choreographer, and model. She is perhaps best known for her reality TV appearances on Making the Band 3 and Pussycat Dolls Present: The Search for the Next Doll. She co-starred in Dolph Lundgren's action film, Command Performance, and had a major role in Honey 2. She adopted her mother's maiden name Molinaro as her professional name in 2010. Melissa has received notable attention from her appearance in Old Navy's "Super C-U-T-E" commercial in 2011 and for the video for "Dance Floor", the first single from Melissa's debut album "The Love/Dance Project".

== Early life ==
Born Melissa Ann Smith in Whitby, Ontario, her family moved to Rochester Hills, Michigan when she was 13 years old. She began figure skating at the age of 3, gymnastics at age 5 and soon began attending Deborah's Stage Dance Door Performing Arts Academy. She was cast as the lead in on-stage productions like Cinderella, Beauty and the Beast, and Cabaret.

At the age of 18, Melissa auditioned for the girl pop group Goddess, and became its lead singer. She was signed to a production deal with Interscope Records, and made her first recording demo. While Goddess never achieved greatness, Melissa continued to work consistently as an actor, dancer and model, appearing in several films, television shows, music videos and commercials. Her early credits include feature film High Crimes and The Hillz; TV series Happy Family, Rodney and Grounded for Life and the unaired WB pilot Prep; music videos for Celine Dion and JC Chasez and The Black Eyed Peas Instant Def webisode. She has appeared in many commercials and done promotional modeling for Miss Fitness, Detroit Automotive Show, Sports By Brooks, Microsoft, Xbox, Skechers, Nappytabs, Nivea and Dickies Girls.

== Career ==
=== 2005–2007: Making the Band 3 and Pussycat Dolls Present: The Search for the Next Doll ===
Molinaro auditioned for MTV's Making The Band 3 and almost won a spot in the group Danity Kane. She made the final eleven girls but when it came to the finale of the show, Melissa was cut. She later took part in another music-themed reality TV show called Pussycat Dolls Present: The Search for the Next Doll in which she competed to become the next member of The Pussycat Dolls. She won many challenges and was eliminated in episode seven, the episode just before the finale. She went on to host the Detroit auditions for Pussycat Dolls Present: Girlicious for CW 50.

She recorded her debut solo single "I Believed" with producer Rex Rideout, which was released independently with 4847 Records in 2008 on iTunes. Her music video to "I Believed" has collectively received nearly one million views on YouTube.

=== 2008–2009: Acting career ===
Molinaro landed a lead role in an action movie starring and directed by Dolph Lundgren, Command Performance in which she plays Venus, a massive music star who becomes a hostage after a Moscow charity concert turns bloody. She performs a song called "Lost in Love" in the film, which is commercially available on the 2008 compilation album Soul by the Pound from Fluid Music USA Inc. She guest starred on Slavi's Show to promote the film which premiered at the Ischia Film Festival on July 19, 2009, and was then released on DVD on November 3, 2009. She also appeared in the Fox sitcom Brothers and on Jimmy Kimmel Live! at the Los Angeles premiere of the film Michael Jackson's This Is It.

=== 2010–present: Old Navy Commercial, Honey 2 and other projects ===
In 2010, Molinaro appeared in the sitcom How I Met Your Mother. In early 2011, Molinaro was featured as the lead performer in the smash hit Old Navy advertisement "Super C-U-T-E" that garnered over 1.7 million views on YouTube within the first week of release. The advertisement also received notice from entertainment outlets such as People and E! News for Molinaro's purported resemblance to Kim Kardashian in the shoot. Old Navy was sued by Kardashian for this ad, and an out-of-court settlement was reached in August 2012.

Molinaro also released her single "Dance Floor" on February 25, 2011, and the music video has over 2 million views on YouTube and features choreography by JaQuel Knight. She landed the role of Carla in the dance sequel Honey 2 and had a small but memorable role as Melissa in the comedy movie Balls to the Wall which was released in 2011. Her debut album is expected to be released in 2012 and features collaborations with multiple producers and songwriters.

Molinaro guest starred in The Game as Kylie in the episode "Catfight on the Catwalk". She played Nooki in the Syfy TV movie Jersey Shore Shark Attack, and Tequila in the feature film School Dance. From 2013 to 2016, Molinaro played te recurring role of Lexi in four episodes of the VH1 series Hit The Floor. She guest starred as Nadine in the season finale of Second Generation Wayans.

Molinaro released two songs on January 31, 2013 on the EP Shake the World including the title track and "Goodbye Forever" from Honey 2.

== Personal life ==
She is married to Bryan Kowalski and has 2 children with him.

== Filmography ==
- School Dance (2013) as Tequila
- Hit the Floor (2013–2016) (TV series) as Lexi
- Second Generation Wayans (2013) (TV series) (episode "The Beginning of the End of the Beginning") as Nadine
- The Last Stand (2013 film) as EMT (scenes deleted)
- Jersey Shore Shark Attack (2012) as Nooki
- The Game (2012) (TV series) (episode "Catfight on the Catwalk") as Kylie
- Honey 2 (2011) as Carla (as Melissa Smith)
- Balls to the Wall (2011) as Melissa
- How I Met Your Mother (2010) (TV series) (episode "False Positive") as Noelle
- Brothers (2009) (TV series) (episode "Week in the Chair") as Girl No. 2 (as Melissa Smith)
- Command Performance (2009) as Venus (as Melissa Smith)
- The Aubrey O'Day Show (2009) as Herself (as Melissa)
- Pussycat Dolls Present: The Search for the Next Doll (2007) (TV series) as Herself – Contestant (as Melissa S.)
- Exposed (2007) (TV series) (episode "Celebrity Edition") as Herself (as Melissa Smith)
- Balance (2006) as Girl Victim (as Melissa Smith)
- Rodney (2006) (TV series) (episode "Where the Rubber Meets the Road") as Dance Major (as Melissa Smith)
- Making The Band 3 (2005–2006) (TV series) as Herself – Contestant (Season 2) (as Melissa)
- The Young and the Restless (2004) as JT's Love Interest (as Melissa Smith)
- Happy Family (2004) as Hostess (as Melissa Smith)
- The Hillz (2004) as Melissa (as Melissa Smith)
- Destiny's Child (2003) as Danielle (as Melissa Smith)
- Grounded for Life (2003) (TV series) (episode Just Like a Woman) as Cheerleader (uncredited)
- High Crimes (2002) as Soldier's Girlfriend (uncredited)
- Prep (2002) as Britney (as Melissa Smith)
- Journey of Redemption (2002) as Ashley Anderson (as Melissa Smith)

== Discography ==
=== Albums ===
- The Love/Dance Project (unknown)

=== Compilation albums ===
Year	Album	Compilation tracks
2008	Soul by the Pound	Lost in Love

=== Singles ===
Year	Title	Album	Chart positions
Year	Title	Album	US
2008	"I Believed"	I Believed (single)	N/A
2008	"Lost in Love"	Soul by the Pound	N/A
2011	"Dance Floor"	Dance Floor (single)	N/A
2012	"Shake The World/Goodbye Forever"	Shake The World (single)	N/A
2013	"The One"	The One (single)	N/A

=== Other songs ===
- "So Hot"
- "Maybe"
- "Exposed"
- "Not That Simple"
- "Pills"
- "Farenheit"
- "Sex Tape"
- "Turn It Up"
- "All or Nothing" (feat. MRK1)
- "5,6,7,8"
- "Crash and Burn"
- "Falling"
- "Touch Me" (featured on Jersey Shore Shark Attack)
- "Love Bites" (featured on Jersey Shore Shark Attack)
