= 2 in the Morning =

2 in the Morning may refer to:

- "2 in the Morning" (Girlicious song), 2010
- "2 in the Morning" (New Kids on the Block song), 2009
- "2 in the Morning", a 2016 song by Kongos from Egomaniac (album)
- 2 in the morning, the time of the day which corresponds to 0200 in the 24-hour clock, see 12-hour clock
