= Nitollano =

Nitollano is a surname. Notable people with the surname include:

- Asia Nitollano (born 1988), American singer, dancer, model, and cheerleader
- Bataan Nitollano (born 1942), known professionally as Joe Bataan, Filipino–American singer-songwriter and musician
