= Girlicious (album) =

Studio album by Girlicious
- Released: August 12, 2008
- Recorded: 2007–2008
- Genre: Pop; hip hop; R&B
- Length: 50:59
- Label: Geffen
- Producer: Ron Fair; Jazze Pha; Da Bank; The Runners; MaddScientist; J. R. Rotem; Dre & Vidal; Rico Love; Kadis & Sean; Beau Dozier; Stefanie Ridel

Girlicious chronology
Girlicious (2008)	Rebuilt (2010)

Deluxe edition cover

Singles from Girlicious
- 1. "Like Me" Released: April 22, 2008; 2. "Stupid Shit" Released: April 22, 2008; 3. "Baby Doll" Released: October 30, 2008

Professional ratings
Review scores
Source	Rating
AllMusic	3.5/5 stars
Now	1/5 Ns
Slant	2.5/5 stars

Girlicious is the debut studio album by American girl group Girlicious, released on August 12, 2008 in Canada, through Geffen Records. It infuses hip hop and R&B with pop music. Its production began in 2007, after the filming of Pussycat Dolls Present: Girlicious. Although it did not chart in the United States, Girlicious debuted at number two on the Canadian Albums Chart and was later certified platinum in the country. A deluxe edition for the album was released on December 9, 2008, including two new songs and three remixes of the singles.

== Release and reception ==
Released as a CD and music download in Canada on August 12, 2008, the album generated positive reviews from critics upon its release. The album topped the charts debuting at number 2 on the Canadian Album Charts and has since been certified Platinum.

To date the album sparked three singles. The first single, "Like Me" managed to debut at number 4 in Canada and at number two on the Bubbling Under Hot 100 Singles in the United States and was listed for 19 weeks. The second single, "Stupid Shit" managed to debut at number 20 in Canada, where it was listed for 10 weeks. The third and final single, "Baby Doll" only managed to peak at 55 and was only listed for a total of three weeks making it the groups least successful single to date.

The album itself received positive reviews from critics. Allmusic's Matthew Chisling gave it a positive review, stating: "On their debut release, the four girls involved, Natalie Mejia, Nichole Cordova, Chrystina Sayers, and Tiffanie Anderson, deliver a well-balanced set of sexually charged, urban-friendly pop and dance numbers which satisfy the listener."

== Promotion ==
Main promotion for the group was their own show, Pussycat Dolls Present: Girlicious. Girlicious made their debut performance at the MuchMusic Video Awards on June 15, 2008 with their hit single "Like Me". On August 6, 2008, Girlicious performed 6 songs from the album at their first Live @ Much: "Stupid Shit", "Baby Doll", "Still In Love", "Here I Am", "Liar, Liar" and "Like Me".

=== Tour ===
Girlicious took part in a North American tour as the opening act of the "Unbreakable Tour" with the Backstreet Boys that began July 30, 2008 and ended September 6, 2008.

Girlicious returned to Canada to tour for the second time in 2008 with The Girlicious Tour, which featured special guest Danny Fernandes. The first set date was scheduled in the beginning of October and ended in November.

During the first week of February 2009 Girlicious made 3 appearances at night clubs throughout Canada. They performed at the Playboy Mansion Gameday Party, and returned to their tour (second leg) with Danny Fernandes in early March. The second leg of The Girlicious Tour finished in late March.

== Singles ==
"Like Me" is the first and debut single from Girlicious. It was released on April 22, 2008 one day prior to The CW's airing of the finale of the show. Without a proper physical or radio release, the single managed to debut at number two on the Bubbling Under Hot 100 Singles and number seventy on the Pop 100 solely based on digital sales. in addition, during the week of May 1, 2008, "Like Me" made a "Hot Shot Debut" at number four on the Canadian Hot 100 becoming an instant hit in Canada. The music video was premiered the day of the finale.

"Stupid Shit" (or Stupid S***) was the second single from the album. It was released on iTunes on April 23, 2008, a day after the finale of the show aired. In the week of May 1, 2008, "Stupid Shit" debuted at #20 on the Canadian Hot 100. The music video for "Stupid Shit" was directed by Robin Antin and Mikey Mind, premiered on Yahoo.com on April 23, 2008. The video debuted on the MuchMusic Countdown at #29 and peaked at #1 which it stayed for one week.

"Baby Doll" was the third and final single from the album. The whole song was performed for the first time by Girlicious on television, when they were on Live @ Much on August 6, 2008. It first entered the Canadian Hot 100 at #75 due to digital downloads during the week the album was released. It re-entered at its current peak of #55 after approximately 4 months due to its single release. The music video premiered on the show OnSet on popular Canadian music station, Much Music, which takes viewers behind the scenes on the set of "Baby Doll". It was directed by Matt Mcdermitt.

=== Other notable songs ===
- "Liar Liar" became a fan-favourite song from the album. Featuring rapper Flo Rida, It charted on the Canadian Hot 100 a peak at position 43, higher than "Baby Doll", even though it hasn't been officially released as a single, on the week of the album's release.
- "Still in Love" charted on the Canadian Hot 100 after the album's release, and peaked at position 99. It features Sean Kingston.

== Track listing ==
Girlicious – Standard edition
No.	Title	Music	Length
1.	"Do About It"	Theodore "Maddscientist" Thomas; Marsha Ambrosius; Sterling Simms	3:41
2.	"Baby Doll"	Andrew Harr; Jermaine Jackson; Makeba Riddick; James Fauntleroy; Stefanie Ridel	3:20
3.	"Liar Liar" (featuring Flo Rida)	Harr; Jackson; Kevin Cossom	3:38
4.	"Save the World"	Andre Harris; Vidal Davis; Rico Love	3:47
5.	"Here I Am"	Priscilla Hamilton; Carlton Mays Jr.; Courtney Dwight	4:13
6.	"Already Gone"	Harr; Jackson; Ridel; Mischke Butler	3:44
7.	"I.O.U.1." (featuring Kardinal Offishall)	Gary "Kadis" Spriggs; Sean Marshall; Jason Harrow; Malkia Thumbi	4:15
8.	"My Boo"	Phalon Alexander; Cedric Williams; Ester Dean; Stacy Barthe	4:12
9.	"Radio"	Harris; Davis; Love; Frank "Knuckles" Walker	3:30
10.	"Still In Love" (featuring Sean Kingston)	Jonathan Rotem; Nikki Flores; Kasia Livingston; James Poyser; Kisean Anderson	3:42
11.	"It's Mine"	Alexander; Williams; Dean	3:30
12.	"The Way We Were"	Rotem; Alan Bergman; Marilyn Bergman; Marvin Hamlisch	3:20
13.	"Stupid Shit"	Beau Dozier; Ridel	3:07
14.	"Like Me"	Alexander; Williams; Dean	2:54
Total length:			50:59

Girlicious – Digital edition bonus track
No.	Title	Music	Length
15.	"Mirror"	Bernard Edwards Jr.; Ambrosius; Simms	3:50
Total length:			55:58

Girlicious – Canadian deluxe edition bonus tracks
No.	Title	Music	Length
15.	"Caught"	Wayne Wilkins; Louis Biancaniello; Sam Watters; Treasure Davis; Robert Daniels	3:40
16.	"Don't Turn Back" (featuring Colby O'Donis)	Clinton Sparks; Aliaume Thiam; Colby O'Donis	4:00
17.	"Mirror"	Bernard Edwards Jr.; Ambrosius; Simms	3:50
18.	"Baby Doll (Dave Audé Club Mix)"	Harris; Jackson; Riddick; Fauntleroy; Ridel	6:48
19.	"Like Me (Dave Audé Club Mix)"	Alexander; Williams; Dean	7:50
20.	"Stupid Shit (Dave Audé Club Mix)"	Dozier; Ridel	7:07
Total length:			62:58

== Charts and certifications ==
=== Charts ===
Chart (2008)	Peak position
Canadian Albums (Billboard)	2

=== Certifications ===
Region	Certification	Certified units/sales
Canada (Music Canada)	Platinum	80,000^{^}
^{^} Shipments figures based on certification alone.
