= Honey 2 =

- Dutch theatrical release poster
- Directed by: Bille Woodruff
- Screenplay by: Blayne Weaver; Alyson Fouse
- Story by: Blayne Weaver
- Based on: Characters by Alonzo Brown; Kim Watson
- Produced by: Paul Hellerman
- Starring: Kat Graham; Randy Wayne; Seychelle Gabriel; Lonette McKee
- Cinematography: David Klein
- Edited by: Paul Millspaugh
- Music by: Sam Retzer; Tim Boland
- Production companies: Reel Deal Entertainment; Marc Platt Productions; MFV Productions
- Distributed by: Universal Pictures Home Entertainment (United States); Universal Pictures International (International)
- Release date: June 10, 2011
- Running time: 111 minutes
- Country: United States
- Language: English
- Box office: $8.7 million

Honey 2 is a 2011 American dance film and a sequel to the 2003 film Honey, directed by Bille Woodruff, who directed the original film. It stars Kat Graham, Randy Wayne, Seychelle Gabriel and Lonette McKee, reprising her role as Connie Daniels, the mother of Honey Daniels from the first film. The film was released to cinemas in the United Kingdom on June 10, 2011, and straight-to-video in the United States on February 21, 2012, on DVD and Blu-ray. Much like the first film, it received negative reviews from critics.

The film was followed by two straight-to-video sequels, Honey 3: Dare to Dance (2016) and Honey: Rise Up and Dance (2018).

== Plot ==
17-year-old Maria Ramirez (Kat Graham) returns from juvie to rebuild her life with nothing but a talent for street dance and a burning ambition to prove herself. She finds refuge in the place that made her feel most alive, as a kid at the rec center where Honey's exuberant classes first ignited her passion for dance.

Keeping on the straight and narrow means living with Honey's mother Connie (Lonette McKee) and holding down a job. Wanting to start over, as being with her old crew landed her in juvi, she joins the HD crew. She wants to give pay back to her old crew (the 718 Crew) and ex-boyfriend Luis (Christopher Martinez) after realizing the bad influence they continue to have.

Maria convinces HD to audition to compete on the television dance competition "Dance Battlezone" which means going up against the 718. The 718 tries to demotivate HD in a street dance-off, and manages to temporarily poach Tina from HD after. Once they involve her in stealing, she realises they are bad news, and begs HD to take her back.

Maria finds passion, romance (with Brandon, NYU student and fellow HD member), and hard work in the HD crew while realizing why she started dancing in the first place.

== Cast ==
- Kat Graham (credited as Katerina Graham) as Maria Ramirez, a former member of the 718 Dance Crew, currently a member of the HD Crew
- Christopher 'War' Martinez as Luis, the leader of the 718 Dance Crew and Maria's ex-boyfriend
- Randy Wayne as Brandon, an HD Crew member and Maria's love interest
- Seychelle Gabriel as Tina, an HD Crew member
- Beau "Casper" Smart as Ricky, an HD Crew member
- Tyler Nelson as Darnell, an HD Crew member
- Brittany Perry-Russell as Lyric, an HD Crew member
- Melissa Molinaro as Carla, an HD Crew member
- Lonette McKee as Connie Daniels, Maria's foster mother
- Gerry Bednob as Mr. Kapoor
- Mario Lopez as Host
- Audrina Patridge as Hot Celebrity Judge
- Laurie Ann Gibson as Katrina, Celebrity Judge
- Rosero McCoy as Jonas, Celebrity Judge
- Alexis Jordan as Herself
- Luke Broadlick as HD Crew #1
- Justin Deanda as HD Crew #2

== Reception ==
On the review aggregator website Rotten Tomatoes, 10% of 21 critics' reviews are positive, with an average rating of 3.7/10. The website's consensus reads: "Stop the music, Honey has fallen off track in this unwanted sequel of banal missteps."
