= Jersey Shore Shark Attack =

- Written by: Jeffrey Schenck; Peter Sullivan
- Screenplay by: Michael Ciminera; Richard Gnolfo
- Directed by: John Shepphird
- Starring: Melissa Molinaro
- Music by: Andres Boulton; Marc Jovani
- Country of origin: United States
- Original language: English

Production
- Executive producers: Barry Barnholtz; Jeffrey Schenck
- Producers: Griff Furst; Fred Olen Ray; Kimberly A. Ray; Peter Sullivan
- Cinematography: Theo Angell
- Editor: Randy Carter
- Running time: 87 minutes

Original release
- Network: Syfy
- Release: June 8, 2012

Jersey Shore Shark Attack is a 2012 television film that aired on Syfy on June 8, 2012, and was written by Michael Ciminera and Richard Gnolfo. It was built around the popularity of the well-known MTV program, Jersey Shore.

== Plot ==
The film centers around a series of deadly shark attacks in New Jersey. Drilling for a new park attracts rare sharks which slowly devour the tourists. In the middle of the movie, the character "Nookie" is invited over to a yacht party which turns deadly as the sharks attack the vessel. They are rescued and they move on to save the main character's dad who had jumped in the water to save a stranded girl. At the end a reporter says that the attacks are over. However, a shark jumps out of the water and the screen cuts to black. The torment is far from over.

== Cast ==
- Jeremy Luke as Gino "The Complication" Moretti
- Melissa Molinaro as Nicolina "Nooki" Santamaria
- William Atherton as Dolan
- Daniel Booko as Paulie Balzac
- Vinny Guadagnino as Joe Conte
- Alex Mauriello as "J-Moni"
- Audi Resendez as "B.J."
- Joey Russo as Donnie
- Tony Sirico as Captain Salie
- Jack Scalia as Sheriff Moretti
- Paul Sorvino as Mayor Palantine
- Grant Harvey as Bradford
- Al Sapienza as Mike
- Dylan Vox as Spencer
- Gabrielle Christian as Penelope
- Joey Fatone as Himself
