= Pussycat Dolls Present: Girlicious =

- Created by: Robin Antin
- Starring: Robin Antin; Lil' Kim; Ron Fair; Mark McGrath
- Opening theme: Don't Cha
- Country of origin: United States
- No. of episodes: 10

Production
- Executive producers: Ken Mok; McG; Robin Antin; Ron Fair; Laura Feust; Jimmy Iovine
- Running time: 60 min.
- Production companies: Warner Horizon Television; Wonderland Sound and Vision; Magic Molehill Productions; 10 by 10 Entertainment; Interscope Records; Geffen Records

Original release
- Network: The CW
- Release: February 18 – April 23, 2008

Pussycat Dolls Present: Girlicious is the second and final season of Pussycat Dolls Present that premiered on February 18, 2008 on The CW, and aired for a total of eight weeks. It was a joint venture between Ken Mok's 10x10 Entertainment, Pussycat LLC, Interscope A&M Records, Wonderland Sound and Vision, and Warner Horizon Television.

The show was filmed in the summer of 2007, and followed aspiring female singers/dancers competing in order to claim their spots to become part of the girl group Girlicious. Girlicious is the creation of Robin Antin, creator of The Pussycat Dolls, who in the first season was searching for the next doll, but was now searching for an entirely new pop group by the name Girlicious. Girlicious, unlike the Pussycat Dolls, was a more urbanized, all female trio. This is the format for the second season of the Pussycat Dolls Present series, focusing mostly on female dancers/singers, looking for fame in the music industry. This season features 15 young women competing for the three slots open. The contestants are: Alexis Pelekanos, Carrie Jones, Cassandra Porter, Charlotte Benesch, Charlye Nichols, Chrystina Sayers, Ilisa Juried, Jamie Lee Ruiz, Jenna Artzer, Keisha Henry, Kristin McCallum-Vlaze, Megan Dupre, Natalie Mejia, Nichole Cordova and Tiffanie Anderson.

The album was released on August 12, 2008 and their first single, "Like Me" premiered on April 23 right after the finale of the series. The same day, "Stupid Shit" was released. A third season of Pussycat Dolls Present was planned but was cancelled due to low ratings.

== Finalists ==
Name	Age	Hometown	Outcome
Charlotte Benesch	20	Washington, D.C.	Eliminated in Episode 1
Kristin McCallum-Vlaze	24	Portland, Oregon	Eliminated in Episode 1
Keisha Henry	22	North Hollywood, California	Eliminated in Episode 1
Megan Dupre	18	Sunset, Louisiana	Eliminated in Episode 2
Alexis Pelekanos	22	Pittsburgh, Pennsylvania	Eliminated in Episode 3
Cassandra Porter	23	Aurora, Illinois	Eliminated in Episode 4
Jamie Lee Ruiz	21	Miami, Florida	Eliminated in Episode 5
Ilisa Juried	19	Palm Beach, Florida	Eliminated in Episode 5
Jenna Artzer	18	Thousand Oaks, California	Eliminated in Episode 6
Carrie Jones	25	Fairfield, Illinois	Eliminated in Episode 8
Charlye Nichols	19	Baytown, Texas	Eliminated in Episode 10
Tiffanie Anderson	18	Los Angeles, California	Qualified
Natalie Mejia	19	Diamond Bar, California	Qualified
Chrystina Sayers	20	San Diego, California	Qualified
Nichole Cordova	18	Houston, Texas	Qualified

=== Makeovers ===
- Jamie: Dyed auburn and orange highlights
- Charlye: Bangs added, extended
- Carrie: Bangs added, dyed whiter platinum blonde
- Tiffanie: Trimmed, sidebangs added
- Natalie: Straightened, dyed chestnut
- Chrystina: Extended, trimmed
- Nichole: Yellow blonde extensions added
- Jenna: Dyed darker and chestnut highlights
- Ilisa: Trimmed and had shine added
- Cassandra: Edgier cut and brown highlights

== Elimination chart ==
Colour key

–	Contestant was team captain that week.
–	Contestant is immune from elimination.
–	Contestant won a prize but did not win immunity.
–	Contestant was part of a non-elimination bottom two.
–	Contestant was eliminated.
–	Contestant qualified for Girlicious

Robin Antin's Call-Out Order
Order	1	2	3	4	5	6	8	9	10
1	Tiffanie	Jenna	Natalie	Chrystina	Chrystina	Tiffanie	Charlye	Natalie	Nichole
2	Alexis	Charlye	Charlye	Jenna	Charlye	Carrie	Nichole	Tiffanie	Tiffanie
3	Megan	Chrystina	Tiffanie	Tiffanie	Carrie	Charlye	Tiffanie	Nichole	Natalie
4	Jamie	Carrie	Carrie	Carrie	Nichole	Nichole	Chrystina	Chrystina	Chrystina
5	Jenna	Nichole	Jamie	Charlye	Tiffanie	Natalie	Natalie	Charlye	Charlye
6	Charlye	Natalie	Cassandra	Nichole	Natalie	Chrystina	Carrie	Eliminated (Episode 8)	
7	Chrystina	Ilisa	Ilisa	Natalie	Jenna	Jenna	Eliminated (Episode 6)		
8	Nichole	Tiffanie	Jenna	Ilisa	Ilisa	Eliminated (Episode 5)			
9	Cassandra	Alexis	Nichole	Jamie	Jamie	Eliminated (Episode 5)			
10	Ilisa	Jamie	Chrystina	Cassandra	Eliminated (Episode 4)				
11	Natalie	Cassandra	Alexis	Eliminated (Episode 3)					
12	Carrie	Megan	Eliminated (Episode 2)						
13	Keisha	Eliminated (Episode 1)							
14	Kristin	Eliminated (Episode 1)							
15	Charlotte	Eliminated (Episode 1)							

Notes:

- On Week 1 the contestants were called by groups except for the last six who were called individually. On Weeks 2 and 4 they were called by groups, with the weakest group up for elimination and on Weeks 3 and 5 they were all called together except for the immunity winner (called first) and the bottom four. Afterwards things got back to the bottom two system.
- On Week 3 Natalie was called out by Mark McGrath but not by Robin. On Week 6 Jenna was called and then eliminated, Chrystina wasn't called at all. In the finale, Robin called the first two winners, then Charlye who was eliminated and finally surprised Natalie and Chrystina by telling them they would both be in the group.
- On Week 5 Charlye and Chrystina were rewarded a Hello Kitty diamond necklace for their performance on the challenge, on Week 6 Charlye was given an extra vocal session by Kenn Hicks and on Week 9 Natalie only won to have her Extra promo aired, not immunity.
- Week 7 is a recap episode.
- On Week 5 two contestants were planned to be sent home, while on Week 9 the judges couldn't agree on whom to send home and kept all 5 girls.

== Performances ==
=== Episode 1: Let's Get Girlicious ===
After some bonding where Keisha reveals herself to be a lesbian, Charlye that her father died and Cassandra shows the girls her tattoo, the 15 semi-finalists are told that they must pick one song each by a pre-selected group of three. The results are as follows:

Artist	Group	Song	Results
Tiffanie Anderson	1	"Tainted Love"	Safe
Alexis Pelekanos	1	"Tainted Love"	Safe
Megan Dupre	1	"Tainted Love"	Safe
Keisha Henry	2	"My Lovin' (You're Never Gonna Get It)"	Eliminated
Ilisa Juried	2	"My Lovin' (You're Never Gonna Get It)"	Safe
Carrie Jones	2	"My Lovin' (You're Never Gonna Get It)"	Bottom 4
Jamie Lee Ruiz	3	"Where Did Our Love Go"	Safe
Jenna Artzer	3	"Where Did Our Love Go"	Safe
Charlye Nichols	3	"Where Did Our Love Go"	Safe
Chrystina Sayers	4	"Right Now"	Safe
Nichole Cordova	4	"Right Now"	Safe
Cassandra Porter	4	"Right Now"	Safe
Charlotte Benesch	5	"We Got the Beat"	Eliminated
Natalie Mejia	5	"We Got the Beat"	Safe
Kristin McCallum-Vlaze	5	"We Got the Beat"	Eliminated

The girls practice and Keisha's vocal short-comings are highlighted. Charlotte and Natalie have an argument, when Natalie doesn't lend Charlotte a pair of boots. The girls are taken to the Tom Tom club. At the club, the girls perform karaoke and both Ilisa and Carrie impress the judges. Back at home, Jenna is revealed to have a ruptured cyst and is taken to the emergency room. She then spends the rest of rehearsal in a wheelchair, much to Robin's astonishment. In the final performance, Group 2 and 5 are deemed the worst but Ilisa, Natalie and then Carrie are spared, narrowing the group to 12 finalists.

=== Episode 2: Confidence ===
The girls move into the house and Chrystina and Natalie separate themselves from the rest and gossip. During vocal rehearsals of the *NSYNC group, former *NSYNC member JC Chasez surprised the girls and gave advice about being in a group. The girls are taught about confidence and learn that their song assignments will be as follows:

Artist	Group	Song	Results
Nichole Cordova	1	"Holiday"	Safe
Natalie Mejia	1	"Holiday"	Safe
Tiffanie Anderson	1	"Holiday"	Safe
Ilisa Juried	1	"Holiday"	Safe
Megan Dupre	2	"...Baby One More Time"	Eliminated
Cassandra Porter	2	"...Baby One More Time"	Bottom 2
Alexis Pelekanos	2	"...Baby One More Time"	Safe
Jamie Lee Ruiz	2	"...Baby One More Time"	Safe
Jenna Artzer	3	"Tearin' Up My Heart"	Safe
Charlye Nichols	3	"Tearin' Up My Heart"	Safe
Chrystina Sayers	3	"Tearin' Up My Heart"	Safe
Carrie Jones	3	"Tearin' Up My Heart"	Safe

They are then taken to a baseball game where they learn that their challenge will be to sing the national anthem in front of the audience. Only one group will sing it though and the best individual in that group will be safe from elimination at this week's performance. After a first check, the group made up of Carrie, Charlye, Jenna and Chrystina is selected to sing The National Anthem. Carrie wins immunity for being the best overall. Back at home Natalie is confronted by her teammates for not being confident at the challenge, bringing her to tears so she calls her mom who encourages her to bring her confidence up. At the final performance, "Baby One More Time" is unanimously deemed the worst and Megan and Cassandra land in the bottom two. In the end, Megan is eliminated for being too pompous.

=== Episode 3: Charisma ===
This week is about charisma. Robin selects Carrie, Chrystina and Charlye as team leaders and Ilisa is the last to be picked. The song assignments are as follows:

Artist	Group	Song	Results
Charlye Nichols	1	"These Boots Are Made for Walkin'"	Safe
Tiffanie Anderson	1	"These Boots Are Made for Walkin'"	Safe
Nichole Cordova	1	"These Boots Are Made for Walkin'"	Safe
Carrie Jones	2	"Girls Just Wanna Have Fun"	Safe
Jamie Lee Ruiz	2	"Girls Just Wanna Have Fun"	Safe
Alexis Pelekanos	2	"Girls Just Wanna Have Fun"	Eliminated
Cassandra Porter	2	"Girls Just Wanna Have Fun"	Safe
Chrystina Sayers	3	"Respect"	Bottom 2
Natalie Mejia	3	"Respect"	Safe
Jenna Artzer	3	"Respect"	Safe
Ilisa Juried	3	"Respect"	Safe

Ilisa struggles with not having a place in the competition. Later the girls are taken to a listening party where they meet Nicole from The Pussycat Dolls and hear her new solo album. Then, the girls perform "I Don't Need a Man" in front of critical fans in their groups. The fans liked Nichole, Jamie, Ilisa and Natalie. Natalie wins immunity for receiving the most votes. Back at the house, Ilisa tells the girls about her story of living with a heart defect and wanting to inspire people with her music. Meanwhile, Tiffanie gets criticism for being too over the top, exaggerating her voice.

During the final performance, the judges deem all the groups as good and Chrystina lands in the bottom two with Alexis who is eliminated for not standing out enough.

=== Episode 4: Style ===
The girls learn that this week is about style and are given the following song assignments:

Artist	Group	Song	Results
Charlye Nichols	1	"Take Your Time (Do It Right)"	Safe
Natalie Mejia	1	"Take Your Time (Do It Right)"	Safe
Nichole Cordova	1	"Take Your Time (Do It Right)"	Safe
Jamie Lee Ruiz	2	"Heart of Glass"	Bottom 2
Ilisa Juried	2	"Heart of Glass"	Safe
Cassandra Porter	2	"Heart of Glass"	Eliminated
Chrystina Sayers	3	"Dim All the Lights"	Safe
Tiffanie Anderson	3	"Dim All the Lights"	Safe
Jenna Artzer	3	"Dim All the Lights"	Safe
Carrie Jones	3	"Dim All the Lights"	Safe

Cassandra begins to freak out because the song is very hard to sing and she doesn't have the vocals for it. The girls all get makeovers and Jamie struggles with her red hair, while Natalie utters her infamous quote: Beauty is a talent. This week both Chrystina and Jenna struggle with the fact that they were among the last called out by Robin the week before but Robin tells them they have to learn how to deal with constructive criticism. Jenna is also criticized by the other girls for being too lazy. The challenge involves the girls working their new makeover for a staged red carpet for In Touch Weekly magazine which Nichole wins. At the performance, Jamie, Ilisa, and Cassandra's group is deemed the worst and despite Ron stating that they should eliminate Jamie for her attitude, a teary eyed Robin eliminates Cassandra for not having vocals that are strong enough in an elimination that is reminiscent of Mariela's from the previous season.

=== Episode 5: Kitchen Confrontation / Sexiness ===
This week's theme is sexiness and Robin raises the stakes by revealing that two girls will go home, making Jamie afraid since she has now to gain two places in the call out. The song assignments are as follows:

Artist	Group	Song	Results
Chrystina Sayers	1	"Hit Me with Your Best Shot"	Safe
Nichole Cordova	1	"Hit Me with Your Best Shot"	Safe
Jenna Artzer	1	"Hit Me with Your Best Shot"	Bottom 3
Carrie Jones	2	"Piece of My Heart"	Safe
Ilisa Juried	2	"Piece of My Heart"	Eliminated
Tiffanie Anderson	2	"Piece of My Heart"	Safe
Jamie Lee Ruiz	3	"I Want You to Want Me"	Eliminated
Natalie Mejia	3	"I Want You to Want Me"	Safe
Charlye Nichols	3	"I Want You to Want Me"	Safe

After their first rehearsals Natalie finds out that her grandmother has died but pulls herself to win for her family. The challenge is a sexy dance-off on Nelly Furtado's "Do It" and Charlye and Chrystina are the last two standing. It is Chrystina who wins due to her chemistry with her partner, while she and Charlye both get a Hello Kitty diamond necklace. Cliques begin to form, with Jenna, Natalie and Chrystina (known as JNC) on one side and Nichole, Charlye and Tiffanie (also known as TNC) on the other and they come to blow when Charlye criticizes the girls for being too sexual. Tiffanie and Charlye lash out at Jenna and Chrystina while an amused Jamie watches. Jenna then sleeps through rehearsal and ponders quitting due to her feud with the other clique but is talked out of it by Robin. At the final performance, Ron once again disagrees with Robin and wants Jenna out but in the end it's Jamie, for her lack of vocals and Ilisa for her lack of knowledge about sexiness who are eliminated.

=== Episode 6: Vocal Expression ===
This week's theme is about vocal expression and the girls are assigned a medley. Nichole, Charlye, Jenna and Natalie sing "Emotion" and Carrie, Tiffanie and Chrystina perform "Flashdance... What a Feeling" and then all the girls perform a dance routine at the end of the lat song. Natalie storms out on Ken Hicks in rehearsal after he refuses to give her a line she wants to sing but apologizes after a discussion with Carrie and Tiffanie. The girls record Girlicious's first song, "Leave You Alone" at Geffen Records and despite Natalie's vocal improvement it is Tiffanie who wins immunity. However, Natalie is mentioned for her "surprise attack."

Artist	Song 1	Song 2	Results
Nichole Cordova	"Emotion"	"Flashdance... What a Feeling"	Safe
Charlye Nichols	"Emotion"	"Flashdance... What a Feeling"	Safe
Jenna Artzer	"Emotion"	"Flashdance... What a Feeling"	Eliminated
Natalie Mejia	"Emotion"	"Flashdance... What a Feeling"	Safe
Carrie Jones	"Emotion"	"Flashdance... What a Feeling"	Safe
Chrystina Sayers	"Emotion"	"Flashdance... What a Feeling"	Bottom 2
Tiffanie Anderson	"Emotion"	"Flashdance... What a Feeling"	Safe

Charlye struggles with being away from home as her father has died while she was on a class trip years before and wins an extra vocal session by Ken Hicks. Chrystina is told to open but at the last minute soundcheck due to her lack of knowledge of the lyrics her part is swapped with Carrie's. At the performance Chrystina lands in the bottom two with Jenna, who is criticized for her lack of energy. In the end, Jenna is eliminated.

=== Episode 7: A Look Back ===
This episode shows never before seen footage such as the girls' hidden talents, a pole dancing lesson which Alexis refuses to attend a few days before her elimination, Carrie, Jenna, Ilisa and Chrystina getting cozy with the male dancers, the judges bloopers, Natalie's breakdown after her argument with Ken Hicks, The girls receiving make-up and Tiffanie trying to take it all, Carrie getting sick during the male dance challenge, Charlye and Jenna's catfight and Nichole singing while Natalie was being comforted after her grandmother died which the other girls though was disrespectful.

- In this episode, the editors erroneously left in a scene with Kenn Hicks and the five remaining girls singing Leave You Alone, which allowed some keen-eyed fans to determine that Carrie would be eliminated in the following episode.

=== Episode 8: Star Quality ===
The week is about star quality and the tension stays in the 2 cliques. Chrystina gets upset after getting put in a group with Charlye and Tiffanie, her biggest rivals. The six girls film the music video for "Leave You Alone" on a yacht and the girl singing the solo in the song will be safe from elimination. Charlye wins. The week's songs were:

Artist	Group	Song	Results
Chrystina Sayers	1	"Thirteen Men"	Safe
Tiffanie Anderson	1	"Thirteen Men"	Safe
Charlye Nichols	1	"Thirteen Men"	Safe
Carrie Jones	2	"Sway"	Eliminated
Nichole Cordova	2	"Sway"	Safe
Natalie Mejia	2	"Sway"	Bottom 2

Carrie lands in the bottom 2 with Natalie. The judges decide that Carrie can stand alone and be a solo artist whereas Natalie needs a group to back her up and thus Carrie is eliminated despite a good performance that night.

=== Episode 9: Public Image ===
After a few low blows on the way home, the girls learn about the week's theme: public image. They go on a media tour to KIIS-FM, where Chrystina forgets her lyrics while Tiffanie manages to be diplomatic about the tensions. They then go to Extra where Chrystina once again struggles but Natalie shines during her promo, winning herself the prize to have it aired nationally. Tiffanie then realizes that the girls have to sort out their differences as Robin might put girls from the two cliques in the group. Charlye however, pretexting a headache, refuses to put forth the effort. The girls then learn that they will all perform Pussycat Dolls songs together.

Artist	Song 1	Song 2	Results
Chrystina Sayers	"How Many Times, How Many Lies"	"Buttons"	Bottom 2
Tiffanie Anderson	"How Many Times, How Many Lies"	"Buttons"	Safe
Charlye Nichols	"How Many Times, How Many Lies"	"Buttons"	Bottom 2
Natalie Mejia	"How Many Times, How Many Lies"	"Buttons"	Safe
Nichole Cordova	"How Many Times, How Many Lies"	"Buttons"	Safe

At the performance, Natalie finally nails her vocals while using her lower register. Chrystina and Charlye land in the bottom two, Chrystina for her lack of consistency despite a strong performance and Charlye for not mixing well with the group. Chrystina is called, leaving a sad Charlye thinking she is going home. However, Robin reveals that the judges couldn't agree on sending anybody home and everyone moves on to the finale.

=== Episode 10: You Are Girlicious ===
This week the girls learn their final lesson, be themselves. They then each get few minutes with Ron Fair and Charlye is a little too honest about the tensions, compromising her chances. The girls then learn their final song assignments:

- Group performance - "Ladies' Night"

Artist	Order	Song	Results
Tiffanie Anderson	1	(You Make Me Feel Like) a Natural Woman	Qualified
Charlye Nichols	2	Before He Cheats	Eliminated
Nichole Cordova	3	Giving Him Something He Can Feel	Qualified
Natalie Mejia	4	Say It Right	Qualified
Chrystina Sayers	5	What About Love	Qualified

Chrystina struggles with not knowing her song but thanks to Natalie she pulls off her strongest performance to date. Charlye is once again criticized for not mixing with the group and her desire is questioned, while Nichole is told she should push more. In the end, Robin calls Nichole first, thanks to her fitting right in the image of the group. She then calls Tiffanie as the second member of the group. She then calls a girl who will not be in Girlicious, Charlye, who is told to hang up her boa. Robin then manages the suspense before proclaiming that while "three girls in this group is great [sic], four girls is Girlicious," revealing that both Natalie and Chrystina made the final lineup. After that, the music video for "Like Me" is aired.

== Post show careers ==
Alexis, Ilisa and Jenna have all released songs on their respective Myspaces.

=== Ilisa Juried ===
Ilisa Juried recently featured in the Willow Smith video, "Whip My Hair" and released the video for her new single "Sensation", available to view on YouTube. In 2010, she played a dancer in the movie Masturbate for Life. She signed a deal with the American Heart Association and Union Bank, where she performed at the Rose Parade with her 2017 single, "Live Your Life", in front of 70 million people on the American Heart Association/Union Bank parade float. She has performed at N.A.M.M for Sennheiser and recently worked with FOX Network to do promo for the LIVE version of "RENT" (2019). Ilisa has now opened her non-profit organization, "LubJu" which focuses on heart health and telling her testimony of cardiac arrest.

=== Carrie Jones ===
Carrie Jones joined the group Angels of Modern Destruction.

=== Tiffanie Anderson ===
Since being dropped from Girlicious, Tiffanie has been featured on the song "Meltin Like Ice Cream" by Chanel West Coast. She is now an artist painting portraits of various people.

=== Jamie Lee Ruiz ===
Jamie has taken part in multiple Robin Antin endeavors such as performing with the Vegas Dolls and appearing in her work-out DVD and Matt Goss's video. She has also appeared in Ester Dean's video as a dancer. She also appeared in Kelly Clarkson's music video for "I Do Not Hook Up" as a bar dancer. In 2010 she performed in the film Burlesque as one of the dancers in the audition sequence.

She recently appeared on an advert promoting the new game Michael Jackson: The Experience airing in the UK and is currently part of girl group YLA.

=== Jenna Artzer ===
In 2011, Jenna Artzer signed a record deal with Blackground Records. She has songs such as "Mind Funk" and "Falling to Pieces" featuring rapper 2 Chainz.

=== Cassandra Porter ===
Is a professional dancer?

=== Charlotte Benesch ===
Charlotte Benesch is now an actress. In 2013, she appeared in episode 4 of the TV series The X Factor. She also had a music page on Soundcloud.

=== Megan Dupre ===
In 2012, she appeared in the movie The Hit Girl. In 2012, she appeared in Pitch Perfect

=== Chrystina Sayers ===
In 2011, she appeared as Dancer #1 in an episode of the TV series The Closer.

== Past show careers (before appearing in "PCD Present: Girlicious") ==
=== Keisha Henry ===
Before appearing in PCD Present: Girlicious, she was a lead vocalist in the group Tom Gurl Four.

=== Natalie Mejia ===
Before appearing in "PCD Present: Girlicious", she was a singer on two groups, "Cherri" and "Breathe".

== Ratings ==
No.	Title	Air date	18–49 rating	Viewers (millions)
1	"Episode 1"	February 18, 2008	0.9/2	1.77
2	"Episode 2"	February 25, 2008	1.3/4	2.00
3	"Episode 3"	March 6, 2008	1.2/4	2.00
4	"Episode 4"	March 10, 2008	0.7/2	1.57
5	"Episode 5"	March 17, 2008	0.7/2	1.57
6	"Episode 6"	March 24, 2008	1.0	1.55
