= Baby Doll (Girlicious song) =

2008 single

Single by Girlicious

from the album Girlicious
- Released: October 30, 2008
- Recorded: 2008
- Genre: Electro-R&B
- Length: 3:20
- Label: Geffen
- Songwriter(s): James Fauntleroy; Makeba Riddick; Stefanie Ridel; Andrew Harr; Jermaine Jackson
- Producer(s): The Runners

Girlicious singles chronology
"Stupid Shit" (2008)	"Baby Doll" (2008)	"Over You" (2010)

Music video
- "Baby Doll" on YouTube

"Baby Doll" is the third single released by American girl group, Girlicious. It was performed for the first time by Girlicious on television, when they were on Live @ Much, on August 6, 2008. This was the last single of Girlicious having four girls in the band. After Tiffanie Anderson's departure, Natalie Mejia started performing her verses.

== Release ==
A 1:30 preview of "Baby Doll" premiered online on August 1, 2008. It was confirmed by Natalie Mejia that the song was the group's third single. The single was released on iTunes Canada, in November. It was also stated by Tiffanie that "Baby Doll" will hit the US in the beginning of the 2009. However the music video was already available on iTunes in the US since 2008.

It first entered the Canadian Hot 100 at #75 due to digital downloads during the week the album was released. It re-entered the chart and peaked at #55 after approximately 4 months due to its single release.

== Music video ==
According to Chrystina Sayers' official MySpace page, Girlicious would be going to the United States to shoot a music video for "Baby Doll". Tiffanie Anderson confirmed on her MySpace blog that they would be shooting the video on October 6, 2008.

The music video premiered on the show OnSet, at the popular Canadian music station Much Music, which took viewers behind the scenes on the set of "Baby Doll". It was directed by Matt McDermitt.

The video starts off with the girls in metallic mini dresses and fur, singing in a green Cadillac with hydraulics. They move on to singing in separate scenes of them dancing outside the Cadillac, with the hood up. The Girlicious group then goes onto the "party scene" performing with male back-up dancers and ends with the girls having pink money falling from above. The video was shot in Los Angeles, at the Quixtoe Studios and was overseen by Robin Antin and Mikey Minden, which was released on iTunes on November 20, 2008.

"Baby Doll" also reached number four on Canada's 'MuchMusic' Countdown.

== Charts ==
Chart (2008)	Peak position
Canada (Canadian Hot 100)	55
