= Rebuilt =

Studio album by Girlicious
- Released: November 22, 2010
- Recorded: 2009–2010
- Genre: Dance-pop
- Length: 33:40
- Label: Universal Music Canada

Girlicious chronology
Girlicious (2008)	Rebuilt (2010)

Singles from Rebuilt
- 1. "Over You" Released: January 5, 2010; 2. "Maniac" Released: April 6, 2010; 3. "2 in the Morning" Released: August 31, 2010; 4. "Hate Love" Released: February 21, 2011

Rebuilt is the second and final studio album by American girl group Girlicious. It was released on November 22, 2010, by Universal Music Canada. The record draws from the dance-pop genre while infusing hints of R&B. Production initially started in 2009, after former member Tiffanie Anderson parted citing personal differences between the girls.

The album's lead single, "Over You", was released on January 5, 2010. It peaked at number 52 on the Canadian Hot 100. "Maniac" was released on April 6, 2010, as the album's second single, peaking at number 74 on the Canadian chart. The album's third and final single, "2 in the Morning", peaked at number 35 on the Canadian Hot 100 after remaining on the chart for nine weeks, giving the group their highest-charting song since "Stupid Shit" (2008).

"Drank" was released on July 20, 2010, in Canada and the United States as a promotional single for the soundtrack of the reality show Jersey Shore, and was later included on Rebuilt. "Hate Love" was sent to airplay as the fourth and final single from the album on February 21, 2011, it is the second longest-charting single of their discography, peaking at 59 after eight weeks.

Rebuilt was the only album released following Anderson's departure as well as the last to be released by the group before their disbandment in 2011.

== Background ==
After the departure of Tiffanie Anderson in mid-2009, the group began working on their follow-up album after switching from Geffen Records to Universal Music Canada. The album features more of a dance-pop genre while still incorporating hints of R&B. The group explained that they chose to switch genres so that their music would accurately reflect their musical tastes as well as themselves. During the writing of the album, the girls had a bigger hand this time around explaining, "We got a bigger hand in the creative aspect of this album than the first one. [...] There wasn't a person in the room saying, 'this is what we need it to be.' We got to pick the parts we want to sing [...] the album will reflect more of who we are."

== Singles ==
"Over You" was released as the album's first single and was sent to Canadian radio on December 25, 2009. It was released to Canadian iTunes on January 5, 2010. The single reached number fifty-two on the Canadian Hot 100.

"Maniac" was released as the second single on April 6, 2010. The song charted at number seventy-four on the Canadian Hot 100. The song charted on the Serbian Top 50 singles, where it was listed for eleven weeks and reached a peak of eleven. The accompanying music video premiered on May 4, 2010. The girls were featured in a special "On Set" with Much Music where the video initially premiered.

"Drank" was released on July 20, 2010, to digital retailers in Canada and the United States. It was released as a promotional single from Rebuilt and is featured as the 11th track on the digital deluxe edition. The single version features a guest rap verse by artist Spose. The song was also featured on the Jersey Shore Soundtrack album without the Spose verse.

"2 in the Morning" was released as the album's third single on August 31, 2010. The song reached a peak of thirty-five on the Canadian Hot 100 becoming their highest-charting song since "Stupid Shit". It contains a sample of "Pesenka" performed by Russian band Ruki Vverh!. The single was also released in the United States on August 31, 2010. A "2 In the Morning (Harper & Brother Mix)" remix version of the song was released in Canada on January 11, 2011.

"Hate Love" was released as the album's fourth and final single on February 21, 2011. The song debuted at number 44 on the Canadian Airplay Chart on the week of March 14, 2011, and later peaked at number 26 on the chart. On the week of April 2, 2011, the song finally debuted on the Canadian Hot 100 at number 97. The song reached a peak of 59.

== Track listing ==
Rebuilt – Standard edition
No.	Title	Writer(s)	Producer(s)	Length
1.	"Face the Light"	Stacy Barthe; Corey Gibson	Beau Dozier	3:51
2.	"Maniac"	Brent Paschke; Drew Ryan Scott; Joacim Persson	Paschke	3:14
3.	"Grinding"	Dozier; Nichole Cordova; Chrystina Sayers; Natalie Mejia	Dozier	3:41
4.	"2 in the Morning"	Cordova; Damon Reinagle; Jimmy Burney II; Robert T. Gerongco; Samuel T. Gerongco; Alex Joerge Christensen; Peter Koenemann; Sergej Zhukow; Alexei Poteschin; Jedediah Harper	Kuya; Judi	3:16
5.	"Unlearn Me"	August Rigo	Rigo	3:54
6.	"Wake Up"	Dozier; Cordova; Sayers	Dozier	3:28
7.	"Sorry Mama (Intro)"	Paschke; Scott; Cordova; Sayers	Paschke	1:44
8.	"What My Mama Don't Know"	Paschke; Scott; Cordova; Sayers; Mejia	Paschke	3:40
9.	"Over You"	Rigo	Rigo	3:29
10.	"Hate Love"	Josh Ramsay; Lorello	Ramsay	3:16
Total length:				33:40

Rebuilt – Digital deluxe edition (bonus tracks)
No.	Title	Writer(s)	Producer(s)	Length
11.	"Drank" (.5 Mix) (featuring Spose)	Paschke; Cordova; Sayers; Mejia	Paschke	3:36
12.	"These Arms"	Rigo	Rigo	3:51
13.	"Game Over"	Ramsay	Ramsay	2:53
14.	"Maniac" (Cajjmere Wray mix)			3:48
15.	"Maniac" (music video)			3:13

Notes

- "2 in the Morning" contains a sample of the song "Pesenka" by Russian duo Ruki Vverh!

== Charts ==
Chart performance for Rebuilt
Chart (2010)	Peak position
Canadian Albums (Nielsen SoundScan)	86
