= Molinaro =

Molinaro is an Italian-language occupational surname for a miller. Notable people with the surname include:

- Al Molinaro, American actor
- Cristian Molinaro, Italian football player
- Édouard Molinaro, French film director and screenwriter
- George Molinaro, American politician
- Giulia Molinaro, Italian professional golfer
- James Molinaro, Staten Island, New York politician
- Jim Molinaro, American football player
- Joanne Lee Molinaro, American attorney and vegan author
- Lisa Molinaro, American musician
- Marc Molinaro, New York (state) politician
- Melissa Molinaro, Canadian-American popular music singer
- Robert Joseph Molinaro, known as Bob Molinaro, American baseball player
- Simone Molinaro, Italian composer
- Tamara Molinaro, Italian race car driver
- Ursule Molinaro, French-American writer
- Vince Molinaro, Business strategist, public speaker, and author
