= Pussycat Dolls Present =

American reality television series

- Title card for the second season.
- Genre: Reality competition
- Created by: Robin Antin
- Starring: The Pussycat Dolls; Robin Antin; Lil' Kim; Ron Fair; Mark McGrath
- Opening theme: "Don't Cha" by the Pussycat Dolls
- Country of origin: United States
- Original language: English
- No. of seasons: 2
- No. of episodes: 18

Production
- Executive producer: Ken Mok
- Running time: 42 minutes
- Production companies: Warner Horizon Television; Pussycat LLC; 10 by 10 Entertainment; Wonderland Sound & Vision; Magic Molehill (season 2)

Original release
- Network: The CW
- Release: March 6, 2007 – April 23, 2008

Pussycat Dolls Present is an American reality television series that premiered on March 6, 2007 on The CW, and took place over the course of eight weeks. It was a joint venture between Ken Mok's 10 by 10 Entertainment, Pussycat LLC, Wonderland Sound and Vision, and Warner Horizon Television.

== Overview ==
The series followed a group of young women as they went through an audition process to join the girl group, the Pussycat Dolls. The contestants, who also lived together during the course of the series, were groomed by the group's founder and the series' creator and co-producer, Robin Antin, and were judged on their vocal and dancing ability. Outside of stage performances, the contestants experience choreography, song recording and tensions together.

First season winner Asia Nitollano won the opportunity to join the Pussycat Dolls as the seventh member, but opted to go solo shortly the season finale premiered. Third placer Chelsea Korka joined a new Robin Antin group called the Paradiso Girls.

Second season winner Girlicious (Nichole Cordova, Tiffanie Anderson, Chrystina Sayers and Natalie Mejia) were originally set to be a trio, but decided by the judges and Antin to become a quartet instead. Girlicious immediately started filming music videos and recording songs after the filming wrapped in July 2007.

The second season, titled Pussycat Dolls Present: Girlicious, premiered Monday, February 18, 2008. Pussycat Dolls Present moved to its new night and time beginning Wednesday, April 9 after America's Next Top Model.

The format of the program was more casual (like ANTM) than other talent-based reality shows. Elements in the program included stylish camera shots, original hip hop beats and unique interactions among the contestants. Both seasons were aired nearly a year after shooting. The first season was filmed from September to November 2006, and the second season was filmed from June to August 2007.

On May 13, 2008, the series was officially cancelled by The CW. The concept of the third season was to create a new girl group with a combined style of hip-hop and rapcore inspired by the style of P!nk.

== Purpose ==
The show was much like a music oriented America's Next Top Model as it featured challenges, in-house "drama" and followed the girls inside the house. Just like in its sister show, the girls are all called out in a special order based on their performances, except for the last two who were asked to step forward and criticized more extensively before being told which one is going home.

The girls' performances were always held on stage in The Pussycat Lounge, founded by Antin and PCD. The performances in the lounge were not opened to the public, but for the judges and associates.

The first season featured 18 semi-finalists cut down to nine finalists who got into the mansion. Each week one of them was told to "hang up (her) boa, (as she would) not be the next Pussycat Doll" by Robin Antin based on talent as well as much speculated image criteria. The winner, Asia Nitollano, decided not to join the group and go solo after only a few weeks after the season finale aired, leading many fans to speculate about whether or not she did it willingly.

The second season featured 15 semi-finalists cut down to 12 finalists. This time three slots were open as the goal was to create yet another Robin Antin group called Girlicious. Every week the girls would have to live up to the theme of the week. After performances one girl would have to "hang up (her) boa, as (she) would not be in Girlicious," told by Robin. The winners were Nichole Cordova, Tiffanie Anderson, Natalie Mejia, and Chrystina Sayers. Second Runner-up Carrie Jones was offered a solo deal with Interscope Records but opted to join the group Angels of Modern Destruction, while other contestant Jamie Lee Ruiz joined the burlesque version of the Pussycat Dolls.

== Personalities ==
Mark McGrath was the Master of Ceremonies during the contestants' performances and the sneak peek of the proceeding episode.

Each show contestants performed at the Pussycat Dolls Lounge, consisting of singing and dancing. Based on the stagework, three judges determine the weakest performer, whom they eliminate. The first week, the judges were vocal coach Eric Dawkins, choreographer Mikey Minden who would recur throughout the show as well as main judge Robin Antin and Pussycat Dolls lead singer Nicole Scherzinger. The three judges during all other performances were Robin Antin, Lil' Kim, and Ron Fair. In season 2 however, Eric Dawkins was replaced by Kenn Hicks and Dave Audé has been added to the coaches. Furthermore, the three judges selected the finalists from the semi-finalists as well.

Unlike Lil' Kim and Ron Fair, Robin Antin examined occasionally, she assisted choreographer Mikey Minden with the dance choreography with the wardrobe personnel prior to the girls' performances. Announced by host McGrath as the most popular female rap artist, Lil' Kim also appeared at the lounge. President of Geffen Records, Ron Fair shared similar responsibilities as Lil' Kim.

After the performances they provided their thoughts about them afterwards, and discussed it in private to make their decision. When the judges reached consensus on who will be eliminated, Antin was the one who made the announcement. She made a recurring statement to the loser: "It's time to hang up your boa, you will not be the next Pussycat Doll/you will not be in Girlicious." However, Fair was often noted for criticizing the vocal aspects of the performances, while Kim seemed to be more keen on comparing the rendition with her feelings on the original song and Antin compared the girl to what she sought in a Pussycat Doll.

== Season 1: The Search for the Next Doll ==
Pussycat Dolls Present: The Search for the Next Doll was the first season of Pussycat Dolls Present, in which young aspiring female singers/dancers compete in order to claim their spots to become a new member of the group the Pussycat Dolls.

== Season 2: Girlicious ==
Pussycat Dolls Present: Girlicious was the second season of Pussycat Dolls Present, in which young aspiring female singers/dancers compete in order to claim their spots to become the group Girlicious.

== International airings ==
- Pussycat Dolls Present: The Search for the Next Doll is broadcast on the following international television stations:
  - United Kingdom – 4Music, TMF
  - Netherlands – Veronica
  - Middle East and North Africa – Dubai One
  - Philippines – ETC Entertainment Central
  - Canada – MusiquePlus, MuchMusic, CityTV
  - Australia – Network Ten, Channel V Australia
  - Brazil – Warner Channel
  - France – NRJ 12 promoted as "The next Pussycat Doll, the show that rocked Hollywood upside down".
  - Sweden – TV3
  - South Korea – onstyle airing name is "next pussycatdolls"
  - Norway – TV3
  - Finland – Subtv
  - New Zealand – TV2
  - Italy – MTV
  - Belgium – Plug TV
  - Singapore – MediaCorp Channel 5
  - Latin America – Warner Channel (onstyle airing name is "Pussycat Dolls")
  - Turkey – FoxLife
  - Estonia – Kanal 2
  - Serbia – RTV Pink
