= Maniac (Girlicious song) =

Single by Girlicious

from the album Rebuilt
- Released: April 6, 2010
- Recorded: 2009
- Genre: Dance-pop
- Length: 3:14
- Label: Universal Music Canada
- Songwriters: Brent Paschke; Drew Ryan Scott; Joacim Persson

Girlicious singles chronology
"Over You" (2010)	"Maniac" (2010)	"2 in the Morning" (2010)

Music video
- "Maniac" on YouTube

"Maniac" is a song performed by American girl group Girlicious. It was released as the second single from their second studio album, Rebuilt (2010). It was digitally released on April 6, 2010, and reached number 74 on the Canadian Hot 100.

== Composition ==
"Maniac" was written by Brent Paschke, Drew Ryan Scott and Joacim Persson. Natalie Mejia explained the main concept behind the song saying, "It is just about a love that kind of drives you crazy. You know how love can be. It is a universal law". Nichole Cordova later added, "We've all been through that crazy love, so that's what the song is about."

== Live performances ==
The single was performed for the first time on March 12, 2010, at CHUM FM FanFest 2010. On June 4, they performed the single at Toronto Pride.

== Release ==
On March 22, 2010, a 1:30 snippet of the song premiered on Girlicious' official website and MySpace. The single was digitally released on April 6, 2010.

== Music video ==
=== Background ===
Girlicious dancing in the music video.

The music video for "Maniac" was shot on April 6, 2010, in East Los Angeles, California at the Linda Vista Community Hospital. The video was directed by Kyle Davison. It premiered on May 4, 2010. The girls were featured in a special "On Set" with Much Music where the video initially premiered. While shooting the "On Set" the girls explained the main concept behind the video, "Basically were the patients, [...] we act as if were insane, mad women. It's new, it's exciting, it's something we haven't done yet." On the Brazilian site POPline, it became the most requested and watched video ever, with more than 200,000 views. This was the last music video to feature the group before their disbandment in 2011.

=== Synopsis ===
The video starts off with the three girls seen in separate cages dancing. It then cuts to Chrystina's respective solo where she is seen on an operating room table surrounded by male dancers. The following scene shows all three girls performing choreography while walking down a hallway. Nichole in her respective solo, is seen on a bed singing her verses while being loured by male dancers. After another scene of choreography in water this time, the video cuts to Natalie's respective solo; She is seen in a corner with a spotlight on her with male backup dancers. In the final scene, the girls and male dancers are seen performing more choreography until the girls are eventually locked up by the male dancers.

== Charts ==
On the week of May 25, 2010, "Maniac" entered and peaked on the Canadian Hot 100 at number seventy-four. It remained on the chart for two weeks.

Chart (2010)	Peak position
Canada (Canadian Hot 100)	74
