= Over You (Girlicious song) =

Single by Girlicious

from the album Rebuilt
- Released: January 5, 2010
- Recorded: 2009
- Genre: Dance-pop
- Length: 3:30
- Label: Universal Music Canada
- Songwriters: August Rigo; Alex Lacasse; Mike Lorello
- Producer: Madd Scientist

Girlicious singles chronology
| "Baby Doll" (2008) | "Over You" (2010) | "Maniac" (2010) |

"Over You" is a song by American girl group Girlicious, taken from their second studio album, Rebuilt (2010). It was digitally released in Canada on January 5, 2010, as the lead single from the album. "Over You" is also Girlicious' first single not to feature former member Tiffanie Anderson, who parted in 2009 citing creative differences between her and the new label.

== Promotion ==
The song was officially added to Canadian radio on December 25, 2009. The song was performed for the first time on March 12 at CHUM FM FanFest 2010.

== Chart performance ==
Despite not receiving a physical release the single managed to chart on the Canadian Hot 100 where it was listed for 11 weeks. The first week of release the single reached its peak of 52 solely from digital downloads. "Over You" is also the first song by the group to be listed on the "Canadian National Airplay List".

== Charts ==
| Chart (2010) | Peak position |
|---|---|
| Canada (Canadian Hot 100) | 52 |
