= Live at Much =

- Country of origin: Canada

Original release
- Network: MuchMusic
- Release: 2002

Live at Much, stylized as Live @ Much, is a celebrity interview and/or performance show that is irregularly broadcast on Canadian music television station, MuchMusic. The title used for this kind of show was first used in 2002 and has been since.

The show is filmed in front of a live audience at the Much Music Headquarters on Queen Street West in Toronto, Ontario, Canada. Guests are interviewed by MuchMusic VJs, and if they are musicians, they perform songs. The show typically runs for a duration of 60 minutes. Live at Much has no fixed schedule, and the periods between broadcasts have been as short as two days or as long as three months.

== Guests ==
Some of the guests that have appeared on Live at Much include, but are not limited to:

- All-American Rejects (July 18, 2006)
- Audioslave (October 6, 2005)
- Avril Lavigne
- Backstreet Boys
- Beyoncé (September 14, 2006)
- Britney Spears
- Down with Webster (October 28, 2011)
- Deadmau5 (January 4, 2011)
- Enrique Iglesias (April 4, 2000)
- Evanescence (December 14, 2003, and January 9, 2007)
- Fall Out Boy (May 23, 2013)
- Finger Eleven (December 17, 2007)
- Girlicious (August 6, 2008)
- Good Charlotte (March 23, 2007)
- Gwen Stefani (November 29, 2006)
- Hedley (November 2, 2007)
- Hilary Duff (March 13, 2004, and April 24, 2007)
- Honor Society
- Incubus (January 26, 2004)
- Janet Jackson
- Jessica Simpson (June 11, 2001)
- Jay-Z (July 29, 2005)
- Jonas Brothers (July 3, 2008, and August 30, 2009)
- Justin Bieber (December 22, 2009)
- Ludacris
- Lynda Thomas (September 29, 2000)
- Mary-Kate and Ashley Olsen (August 30, 2005)
- My Chemical Romance (November 2, 2006)
- Nelly Furtado (April 8, 2001, and December 16, 2003)
- Nickelback (November 21, 2008)
- NSync (March 23, 2000 and June 20, 2001)
- Our Lady Peace (January 30, 2006)
- P. Diddy
- Pink (June 8, 2002, October 3, 2003, and April 7, 2006)
- QOTSA (March 29, 2005)
- Red Hot Chili Peppers (August 7, 2002)
- Simple Plan (December 21, 2004 and February 19, 2008)
- Sum 41 (February 15, 2003)
- Stone Temple Pilots
- Swollen Members (September 25, 2002)
- Treble Charger (November 13, 2003)
- White Stripes (November 13, 2003)
- Cast of The Dukes of Hazzard (July 31, 2005)
- Cast of Elizabethtown (September 3, 2005)
- Cast of Twilight (November 15, 2008) (November 15, 2008)
- Cast of House of Wax (May 3, 2005)
