= 2 in the Morning (Girlicious song) =

Single by Girlicious

from the album Rebuilt
- Released: August 31, 2010
- Genre: Pop
- Length: 3:16
- Label: Universal Music Canada
- Songwriters: Nichole Cordova; Alex Christensen; Peter Könemann; Sergey Zhukov; Aleksey Potekhin; Robert T. Gerongco; Samuel T. Gerongco; Damon Reinagle; Jimmy Burney II; Jedediah Harper

Girlicious singles chronology
"Maniac" (2010)	"2 in the Morning" (2010)	"Hate Love" (2011)

"2 in the Morning" is the third and final single from American girl group Girlicious' second studio album, Rebuilt (2010). It is also the group's final single before their disbandment in 2011. It was digitally released in the United States and Canada on August 31, 2010. The song samples Ruki Vverh!'s "Pesenka" (1998).

== Chart performance ==
On the week of September 10, 2010, "2 in the Morning" debuted on the Canadian Hot 100 at number 57. On the week of November 13, 2010, it reached its peak at number 35, making it the most successful single from the Rebuilt era, and their highest-peaking single since "Stupid Shit" (2008). "2 in the Morning" remained on the Canadian Hot 100 chart for a total of 14 weeks.

== Charts ==
Chart (2010)	Peak position
Canada (Canadian Hot 100)	35
Canada Hot AC (Billboard)	27

== Release history ==
Region	Date	Format
United States	August 31, 2010	Digital download
Canada	August 31, 2010	Digital download
