= Pussycat Dolls Present: The Search for the Next Doll =

- Created by: Robin Antin
- Starring: Robin Antin; Lil' Kim; Ron Fair; Mark McGrath Contestants; Anastacia McPherson; Asia Nitollano; Brittany Diorio; Chelsea Korka; Jaime Benjamin; Mariela Arteaga; Melissa Reyes; Melissa Smith; Sisely Treasure
- Opening theme: Don't Cha
- Country of origin: United States
- Original language: English
- No. of seasons: 1
- No. of episodes: 8

Production
- Executive producers: Ken Mok; McG; Robin Antin; Steve Antin; Laura Feust
- Running time: 60 minutes
- Production companies: Warner Horizon Television; Wonderland Sound and Vision

Original release
- Network: The CW
- Release: March 6 – April 24, 2007

Pussycat Dolls Present: The Search for the Next Doll is the first season of Pussycat Dolls Present that premiered on March 6, 2007 on The CW, and aired for a total of eight weeks.

Filmed from September to November 2006 as a joint venture between Ken Mok's 10x10 Entertainment, Pussycat LLC, Interscope A&M Records, Wonderland Sound and Vision, and Warner Horizon Television, the series followed a group of young women as they went through an audition process to join the girl group, the Pussycat Dolls. The contestants, who also lived together during the series, were groomed by the group's founder and the series' creator and co-producer, Robin Antin, and were judged on their vocal and dancing ability. The winner went on to join the Pussycat Dolls as the act's seventh member, and appeared in the series but performed with the group only once before opting to go solo.

In the United Kingdom, the show aired on T4 (the Channel 4 weekend teenage block programming slot) on April 1, 2007. In Australia, the show aired on Network Ten on April 1, 2007.

== Finalists ==
Name	Age	Hometown	Outcome
Brittany Diorio	20	Woodbridge, Virginia	Eliminated in Episode 2
Jaime Benjamin	20	Philadelphia, Pennsylvania	Eliminated in Episode 3
Sisely Treasure	24	Los Angeles, California	Eliminated in Episode 4
Mariela Arteaga	24	Miami, Florida	Eliminated in Episode 5
Anastacia McPherson	23	San Francisco, California	Eliminated in Episode 6
Melissa Smith	24	Toronto, Ontario	Eliminated in Episode 7
Chelsea Korka	20	Cooper City, Florida	Eliminated in Episode 8
Melissa Reyes	18	Sacramento, California	Runner-up
Asia Nitollano	18	Harlem, New York	Winner

=== Makeovers ===
- Jaime: Dyed blonder & restyled
- Sisely: Extensions sewn in
- Mariela: Straightened
- Anastacia: Thinned & straightened
- Melissa S.: Darker & later on bangs added
- Chelsea: Bangs added & trimmed
- Melissa R.: Trimmed ends
- Asia: Blonde streak extensions added

== Elimination Chart ==
Colour key

–	Contestant was team captain that week.
–	Contestant was immune from elimination.
–	Contestant won a prize but did not win immunity.
–	Contestant was eliminated.
–	Contestant won the competition.

Robin Antin's Call-Out Order
Order	1	2	3	4	5	6	7	8
1	Anastacia	Asia	Melissa S.	Mariela	Asia	Melissa R.	Melissa R.	Asia
2	Mariela	Jaime	Anastacia	Chelsea	Melissa R.	Chelsea	Asia	Melissa R.
3	Sisely	Anastacia	Mariela	Anastacia	Melissa S.	Asia	Chelsea	Chelsea
4	Brittany	Mariela	Asia	Melissa R.	Anastacia	Melissa S.	Melissa S.	Eliminated (Episode 7)
5	Melissa S.	Melissa R.	Melissa R.	Asia	Chelsea	Anastacia	Eliminated (Episode 6)	
6	Jaime	Chelsea	Chelsea	Melissa S.	Mariela	Eliminated (Episode 5)		
7	Melissa R.	Sisely	Sisely	Sisely	Eliminated (Episode 4)			
8	Asia	Melissa S.	Jaime	Eliminated (Episode 3)				
9	Chelsea	Brittany	Eliminated (Episode 2)					

Notes:

- On Week 1, Robin Antin announced the final 9 girls, eliminating Shauntae, Catherine, Kelli, Eva, Sandra, Anjelia, Jasmin, Natascha and Robyn.
- On Week 2, Asia was called out by Mark McGrath, but not by Robin Antin.
- On Week 4, Group 1 was called out as "Group 1", no specific name order was given.
- On Week 6, Chelsea and Anastacia were deemed the worst dancers and as such didn't take part in the challenge.
- On Week 7, Melissa S. was called before Chelsea but was eliminated anyway.
- On Week 8, Chelsea was called first and eliminated. Robin then called Asia as the winner.

== Performances ==
=== Episodes ===
==== Episode 1: The Auditions ====
The 18 semi-finalist are given songs as follow:

Artist	Group	Song	Results
Sisely	1	"Hot Stuff (I Want You Back)"	Safe
Brittany	1	"Hot Stuff (I Want You Back)"	Safe
Mariela	1	"Hot Stuff (I Want You Back)"	Safe
Shauntae	1	"Hot Stuff (I Want You Back)"	Eliminated
Melissa S.	1	"Hot Stuff (I Want You Back)"	Safe
Catherine	1	"Hot Stuff (I Want You Back)"	Eliminated
Jaime	2	"Buttons"	Safe
Kelli	2	"Buttons"	Eliminated
Ewa	2	"Buttons"	Eliminated
Melissa R.	2	"Buttons"	Safe
Sandra	2	"Buttons"	Eliminated
Asia	2	"Buttons"	Safe
Anjelia	3	"I Don't Need a Man"	Eliminated
Chelsea	3	"I Don't Need a Man"	Safe
Jasmin	3	"I Don't Need a Man"	Eliminated
Anastacia	3	"I Don't Need a Man"	Safe
Natascha	3	"I Don't Need a Man"	Eliminated
Robyn	3	"I Don't Need a Man"	Eliminated

Rehearsal does not go smoothly, as Anjelia gets sick, and Sisely struggles with her group because she doesn't want to rehearse too late to preserve her energy. Sandra and the members of the "Hot Stuff" group struggle with their vocals while Chelsea and Shauntae struggle with their dancing. The girls are then taken to a Pussycat Dolls concert and meet the Dolls. On the way back home and overnight Jaime, Ewa, Chelsea, Sandra, Melissa S., Mariela, Natascha and Jasmin all get sick, while a now-cured Anjelia rehearses with Anastacia. On their performance, despite being sick, the girls wow the judges and Nicole Scherzinger except for the group who performed "I Don't Need a Man". After deliberation, the nine finalists are called.

==== Episode 2: Welcome to the Dollhouse ====
The girls move in and after a video message by the Dolls (like each week), are given their song assignment as follows:

Artist	Group	Song	Results
Asia Nitollano	1	"Crazy in Love"	Safe
Chelsea Korka	1	"Crazy in Love"	Safe
Melissa Smith	1	"Crazy in Love"	Bottom 2
Anastacia McPherson	2	"Pon De Replay"	Safe
Sisely Treasure	2	"Pon De Replay"	Safe
Melissa Reyes	2	"Pon De Replay"	Safe
Mariela Arteaga	3	"1, 2 Step"	Safe
Jaime Benjamin	3	"1, 2 Step"	Safe
Brittany Diorio	3	"1, 2 Step"	Eliminated

They are then taken to a restaurant where they discover their first challenge will be exotic dancing in a class cage in the restaurant. Despite Jaime overcoming her lack of confidence, Asia wins immunity. During rehearsal, Brittany is criticized for "dancing like a stripperella" while Jaime struggles with her vocals. At the performance, Ron and Kim are introduced as judges and Melissa S. forgets her words but Brittany is eventually eliminated for her overtly sexual moves.

==== Episode 3: The Transformation ====
The girls get a makeover by Jonathan Antin, Robin's brother and taken to a dinner with the judges. The girls embrace their new looks, especially Jaime who says the makeover boosted her self-confidence. In the challenge, the girls go into the recording studio singing the chorus of "Don't Cha" and despite Mariela's vocal improvement, Melissa S. wins immunity. The girls perform as follows:

Artist	Group	Song	Results
Melissa Smith	1	"Free Your Mind"	Safe
Asia Nitollano	1	"Free Your Mind"	Safe
Mariela Arteaga	1	"Free Your Mind"	Safe
Anastacia McPherson	1	"Free Your Mind"	Safe
Jaime Benjamin	2	"Heartbreaker"	Eliminated
Sisely Treasure	2	"Heartbreaker"	Bottom 2
Chelsea Korka	2	"Heartbreaker"	Safe
Melissa Reyes	2	"Heartbreaker"	Safe

The judges decide that the first group did the best; Mariela was praised for her improvement and strong performance with no negative feedback like every girl had. While the judges say that it is Melissa R.'s worst night yet, it is Sisely, who has struggled throughout rehearsal despite being given a rock song, who lands in the bottom two with the still-unconfident Jaime. Jaime is eliminated for not standing out.

==== Episode 4: She Dances Like a Drag Queen ====
At this week's challenge the girls are assigned to perform a self-choreographed routine with a male dancer and Mariela impress the judges with her creativity, gaining immunity. Robin picks Chelsea and Asia to be leaders and Sisely winds up getting chosen last. Chelsea chooses girls she hasn't worked with and does a good job as a leader. Asia doesn't manage too well, being distracted by Sisely's earlier comments about her dancing like a drag queen. The girls perform as follows:

Artist	Group	Song	Results
Chelsea Korka	1	"Shame"	Safe
Mariela Arteaga	1	"Shame"	Safe
Anastacia McPherson	1	"Shame"	Safe
Asia Nitollano	2	"Don't Leave Me This Way"	Safe
Melissa Reyes	2	"Don't Leave Me This Way"	Safe
Sisely Treasure	2	"Don't Leave Me This Way"	Eliminated
Melissa Smith	2	"Don't Leave Me This Way"	Bottom 2

Guys join the girls for a partner dance challenge which Mariela wins. At the final performance Chelsea's group is deemed the best, despite having a weak rehearsal. The ever-struggling Sisely and Melissa S., who has trouble showing her "inner doll", are in the bottom two. Sisely is then eliminated as it becomes evident that her uniqueness is a weakness.

==== Episode 5: Vegas, Baby ====
The girls are taken to Vegas where they perform "Tainted Love" after learning the routine on their moving tour bus. At the Challenge performance, Anastacia feels uncomfortable in her dress, Chelsea gives the strongest vocal performance, and Mariela and Melissa S. receive the loudest cheers. After the public votes are tallied, Melissa S. is crowned winner. Asia rubs some girls the wrong way after deeming the fancy food they are given disgusting and asking for a hamburger instead of cuisine while Anastacia continues to struggle with her weight. The girls are then given the following song assignments, making both Mariela and Anastasia worried: Mariela because she is paired up with the best vocalist in the top 6 and Anastasia because her teammate has immunity.

Artist	Group	Song	Results
Asia Nitollano	1	"I Don't Want to Miss a Thing"	Safe
Melissa Reyes	1	"I Don't Want to Miss a Thing"	Safe
Chelsea Korka	2	"I Turn to You"	Bottom 2
Mariela Arteaga	2	"I Turn to You"	Eliminated
Anastacia McPherson	3	"Un-Break My Heart"	Safe
Melissa Smith	3	"Un-Break My Heart"	Safe

At the final performance, Melissa R. is criticized for crying on stage but is safe due to being in the best duo. Mariela and Chelsea land in the bottom two due to their shortcomings in singing and dancing respectively. In the end, a teary-eyed Robin eliminates Mariela.

==== Episode 6: Dancin' with the Dolls ====
Chelsea expresses her feelings on Mariela's elimination saying that she felt she took away Mariela's dream and did not want her to go home. Anastacia feels her biggest indirect competition was gone. The girls are given a "Wait a Minute" routine to learn where Chelsea and Anastacia struggle. Robin then tells them that only 4 girls will perform it on stage with the Dolls to get immunity, however she makes the last-minute decision to cut both Anastacia and Chelsea out of the performance and they stay on the bus. At the performance, Melissa R. gains immunity despite almost getting too soon on stage. As they come back, the ongoing tension between Melissa S. and Chelsea reaches its highest point as Melissa S. uses Chelsea's name as a synonym for bad dancer. Melissa R. breaks down because she struggles with her identity and sheltered past but is comforted by Melissa S. This week the girls perform a medley as one group and Chelsea is put in a swing, which Melissa S. believes is giving her an excuse to not dance.

Artist	Song	Results
Asia Nitollano	"The Pink Panther Theme"/"Fever"/"Big Spender"	Safe
Anastacia McPherson	"The Pink Panther Theme"/"Fever"/"Big Spender"	Eliminated
Chelsea Korka	"The Pink Panther Theme"/"Fever"/"Big Spender"	Safe
Melissa Reyes	"The Pink Panther Theme"/"Fever"/"Big Spender"	Safe
Melissa Smith	"The Pink Panther Theme"/"Fever"/"Big Spender"	Bottom 2

After losing her microphone in the tub she danced in and singing badly, Melissa S. lands in the bottom two once again, but it is Anastacia who is eliminated due to her inability to advantageously use her figure.

==== Episode 7: The Fantastic Four ====
The girls are taken on a fake promo tour, including a photoshoot, an interview and a commercial for a deodorant. Melissa S. and Melissa R. struggle with their commercial, Chelsea ends up singing it to show off her best asset, and Asia ad libs a bit, talking about The Dolls's confidence. At the interview, Melissa S. deems Chelsea the girl with the least potential, reigniting tension; Asia wins the challenge, though she does not get immunity but to have her commercial run nationally. This week the girls have to perform "Beep"'s dance routine and Chelsea struggles, making Melissa S. happy as she can't evade dancing this week. However she gets the routine down with the help of Asia. The girls are also given solo assignments as follows:

- Group performance - "Beep" (dance routine)

Artist	Order	Song	Results
Melissa Smith	1	"Don't Know Why"	Eliminated
Asia Nitollano	2	"Too Little Too Late"	Safe
Melissa Reyes	3	"I'm Going Down"	Safe
Chelsea Korka	4	"What a Girl Wants"	Bottom 2

Asia is criticized for struggling on a hard song while Chelsea and Melissa S. land in the bottom two: Chelsea for her dancing problem despite pulling off a strong performance this night and Melissa S. for her lack of consistency. Ultimately, an overjoyed Chelsea joins Asia and Melissa R. in the finale and Melissa S. is sent home.

==== Episode 8: The Girl Who Becomes a Doll ====
As the girls come home, Melissa R. voices her relief at Melissa S.' elimination, leading Asia to call her phony at their last dinner with the judges. Tension continues throughout the night and Chelsea is woken up by the other girls' fight. The girls learn their song assignment as follows:

- Group performance - "Lady Marmalade"

Artist	Order	Song	Results
Chelsea Korka	1	"Feelin' Good"	Eliminated
Asia Nitollano	2	"I Don't Need a Man"	Winner
Melissa Reyes	3	"Stickwitu"	Runner-up

- Final performance - "Don't Cha"

All of them struggle due to the tension, leading Robin to tell them that none of them are ready. Melissa R. and Asia continue their fight during the group rehearsal, while a bemused Mikey and Chelsea look on. They then sort out their differences and hug each other. At the performance the judges are wowed by all of the girls, but Chelsea's inability to dance gets her eliminated.

Robin then names Asia the winner and she is joined on stage by the Dolls and performs Don't Cha with them for the first time. Nittollano was set to officially join the Dolls after they would finish touring, but after the season finished airing, she only appeared with the Dolls again at the CW Upfronts Event on May 17, 2007, and shortly after, it was announced that she departed from the group to pursue a solo career.

After the show, Melissa Smith, Melissa Reyes and Chelsea Korka performed the song Fever with the English burlesque group Girlesque at the Fashion Cares event on May 12, 2007 in Toronto, Canada. This led fans to believe that they had started their own group which turned out to be false as Chelsea Korka was in a group named the Paradiso Girls.
