= Asia Nitollano =

American singer (born 1988)

- Born: February 14, 1988 (age 38)
- Origin: Mt. Vernon, New York, US
- Genres: Pop; R&B
- Occupations: Singer, dancer, model, cheerleader
- Years active: 2006–present
- Label: A&M (2007)

Asia Nitollano (born February 14, 1988) is an American singer, dancer, model and cheerleader. After winning the television series Pussycat Dolls Present: The Search for the Next Doll, Nitollano became a member of the Pussycat Dolls, only to leave a few months later to pursue a solo career.

== Early life ==
Nitollano was born in Mt. Vernon, New York. She is the daughter of singer Joe Bataan, and has a daughter. She is of African American, Puerto Rican and Filipino ancestry. As a teenager, Nitollano was a dancer for the New York Knicks. In 2007, she became one of the nine finalists on the CW reality television series, Pussycat Dolls Present: The Search for the Next Doll. During the season finale of the show, she was chosen to become the newest member of the group by judges Robin Antin, Ron Fair and Lil' Kim. According to judge and Pussycat Doll founder Robin Antin, while Nitollano wasn't the strongest vocalist of the final three, she was the best all-round performer.

== Music career ==
Nitollano was a member of the Pussycat Dolls for a brief period of time. Nitollano was set to officially join the Dolls in 2007 after the group would finish their world tour and touring with Christina Aguilera. In July 2007, the Chicago Sun-Times reported that Nitollano, who was never contractually obligated to join the Pussycat Dolls, had decided to embark on a solo career. According to Dawn Ostroff, head of the CW Network, Nitollano was not fired from the group, but opted to go solo. Prior to the announcement, Nitollano's position in the group had been questioned for months, since she had never performed with the group (except on the finale of the show) and had been absent from the group's high-profile performances, most notably Live Earth 2007.

Later in 2007, she appeared in advertisements for Sean Combs' clothing line Sean Jean Women's collection. She reportedly signed a recording deal with The Inc. Records, but has not released any music. By July 2009, Nitollano had returned to the New York Knicks, as a finalist in the auditions for the 2009–2010 Knicks City Dancers.
