= Girlicious =

American girl group

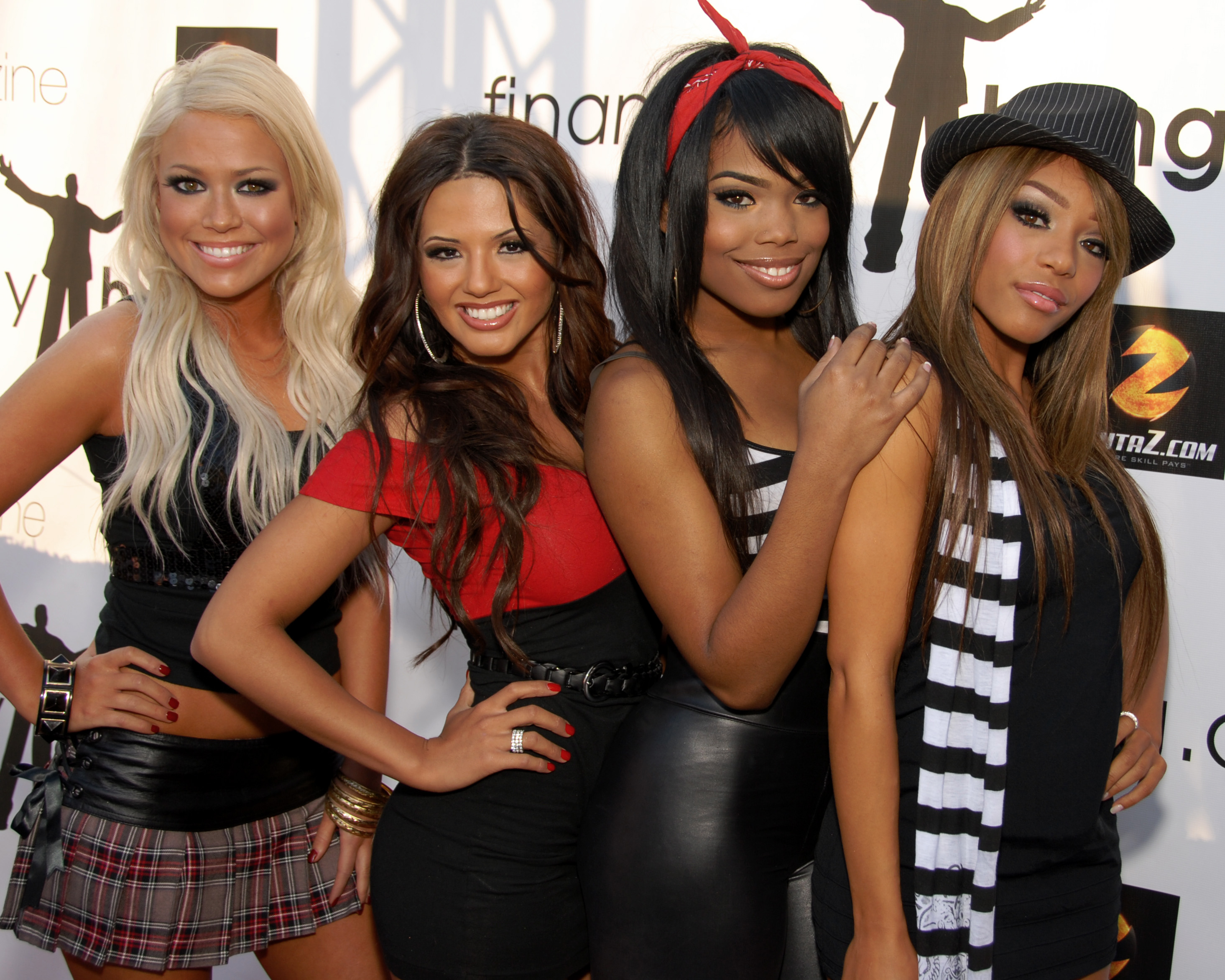
- Girlicious attending Super Bowl XLIII at the Playboy Mansion in Los Angeles, California on 1 February 2009. Left to right: Nichole Cordova, Natalie Slim Mejia, Tiffanie Anderson and Chrystina Sayers

Background information
- Also known as: GLG
- Origin: Los Angeles, California, U.S.
- Genres: R&B; pop; hip hop; dance-pop; urban contemporary
- Years active: 2008–2011
- Labels: Geffen; Universal Music Canada
- Spinoff of: The Pussycat Dolls
- Past members: Chrystina Sayers; Natalie Mejia; Tiffanie Anderson; Nichole Cordova

Girlicious was an American girl group originally formed by Robin Antin, creator of the Pussycat Dolls, from The CW reality TV show Pussycat Dolls Present: Girlicious. The group was originally signed to Geffen Records and composed of members Nichole Cordova, Tiffanie Anderson, Chrystina Sayers and Natalie Mejia. Their self-titled debut album was released in Canada in August 2008 and reached number two on the Canadian Albums Chart. After Anderson left the group in June 2009, Girlicious signed with Universal Music Canada and released their second studio album, Rebuilt, in November 2010. Mejia and Sayers departed the group in February 2011. Nichole Cordova later announced the end of Girlicious, and her joining a new girl group called Girls United.

== History ==
=== 2007–2009: Formation on Pussycat Dolls Present: Girlicious and Girlicious ===
Following the airing of first season of the show Pussycat Dolls Present, Robin Antin sought to create a new girl group called Girlicious, as well as a second season of the show entitled Pussycat Dolls Present: Girlicious. The show began production in the summer of 2007 with 15 finalists being chosen. The show's episodes included improvisation challenges, group or solo performances, as well as drama and tension between the girls. Originally the group was to be a trio, but was conceived as a quartet through a final decision of creator Robin Antin on the show's season finale. The four chosen members, Nichole Cordova, Tiffanie Anderson, Natalie Meija, and Chrystina Sayers began recording their debut album in the fall of 2007, while the show was being edited and prepared for airing on The CW network.

They received greater attention and major success from Canadian audiences, receiving platinum certification in Canada for their self-titled debut album Girlicious. The album peaked at number two on the Canadian Albums Chart. The group was nominated at the Teen Choice Awards for "Breakout Group" of the year but lost to Jonas Brothers, and Pussycat Dolls Present: Girlicious was nominated for "Reality: Music Competition" in 2008 but lost to American Idol.

It was confirmed on June 11, 2009, via a YouTube video upload from Tiffanie Anderson's official YouTube channel, that she was no longer a member of Girlicious. In the video, Anderson cites changes with their new record label and sound, stating: "Robin Antin and the label were looking for a new direction for the group [...] they were looking for the group to not be [urban] any longer". She also speaks of personal differences between some of the girls, saying the group was not seeing eye-to-eye on a lot of things: "a couple of the girls and I didn't have the same values or the same morals – causing a huge conflict in the end of it all." On Sunday, June 21, 2009. Girlicious appeared live at the 2009 MuchMusic Video Awards in Toronto, Canada as nominees and presenters. The group won the award for "Most Watched Video" for "Like Me". Their video for "Stupid Shit" came in at second place.

=== 2009–2011: Rebuilt and split ===
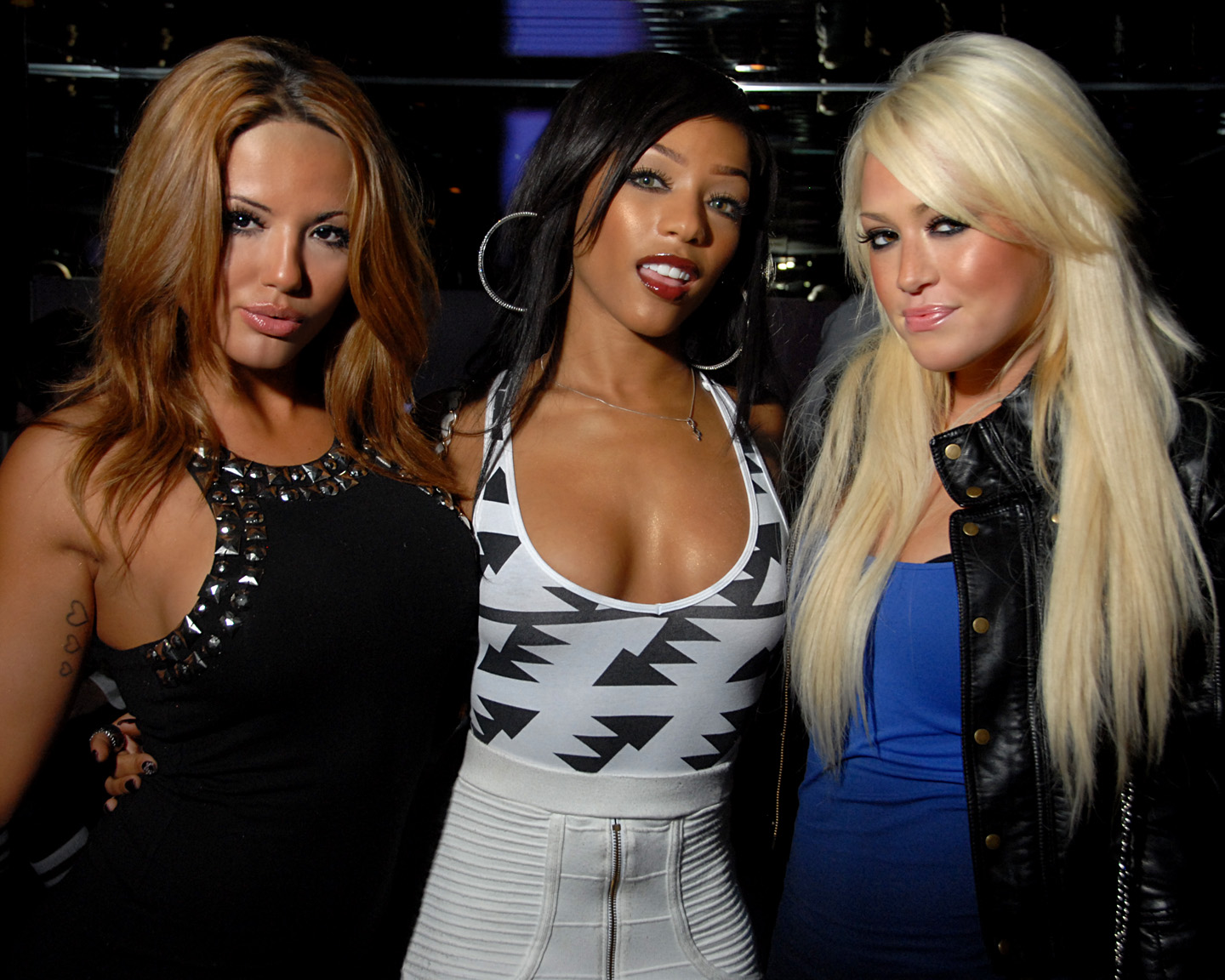
The group's second and final line-up consisting of Mejia, Sayers and Cordova at Mi6, West Hollywood, California on October 14, 2009

In late 2009, the group went into the studio to start recording music for their second studio album. In December 2009 the group announced they had moved from Geffen Records and that they had signed a record deal with Universal Music Canada. The sound for the album will go in a more "Pop" direction, and further away from the Hip-Hop/R&B sound featured on their first album. The group's first single titled "Over You", was sent to Canadian radio stations on December 25, 2009. The song was released to Canadian iTunes on January 5, 2010. The song peaked at number 57 on The Hits Charts (Airplay): Top 100 Singles and number 52 on Canadian Hot 100. The group's second single titled "Maniac" was released to Canadian iTunes on April 6, 2010. The music video was shot on April 6 in LA at an abandoned hospital. It peaked as number 72 on the Canadian Hot 100 chart. The girls were featured on the Jersey Shore Soundtrack, with a song titled "Drank". It was then released on July 20, 2010, to digital retailers in Canada and the United States as a promotional single for Rebuilt. The promotional single featured guest rapper Spose. On August 31, 2010, the girls released their third single titled "2 In the Morning". It made a Hot Shot Debut on the Canada Hot 100 reaching number 57. The song then moved up five places to number 52 in the week of September 16. Then, on the week of November 13, 2010, the song reached its peak at number 35. On September 26 they taped a performance of "Maniac" for Playboy's Beach House, which aired in January 2011. Their second album, Rebuilt, was released on November 22 in Canada reaching number five on the pop album chart.

On February 26, 2011, the group confirmed the exit of Sayers and Mejia via their Facebook and Twitter accounts. It was stated that Cordova was still part of the group and very much ready to get on with the future of Girlicious. After the departure of the girls, "Hate Love" was released as the fourth single from Rebuilt. The song debuted on the Canadian Hot 100 at number 97 in the week of April 2, 2011. In the week of April 30, 2011, the song reached its peak at number 59 while also reaching number 19 on the Canadian Top 40. On June 17, 2011, Cordova performed alongside Carmen Electra on the Pussycat Dolls Burlesque Revue Tour. In October 2011, Cordova announced and confirmed the band's hiatus and also hinted about new members. In May 2012, the group's profile page on Universal Music Canada's website had been removed, confirming they had been dropped by the label.

== Timeline ==
Members	2007	2008	2009	2010	2011
Tiffanie Anderson (2007–2009)					
Chrystina Sayers (2007–2011)					
Natalie Mejia (2007–2011)					
Nichole Cordova (2007–2011)					

== Members ==
=== Chrystina Sayers ===
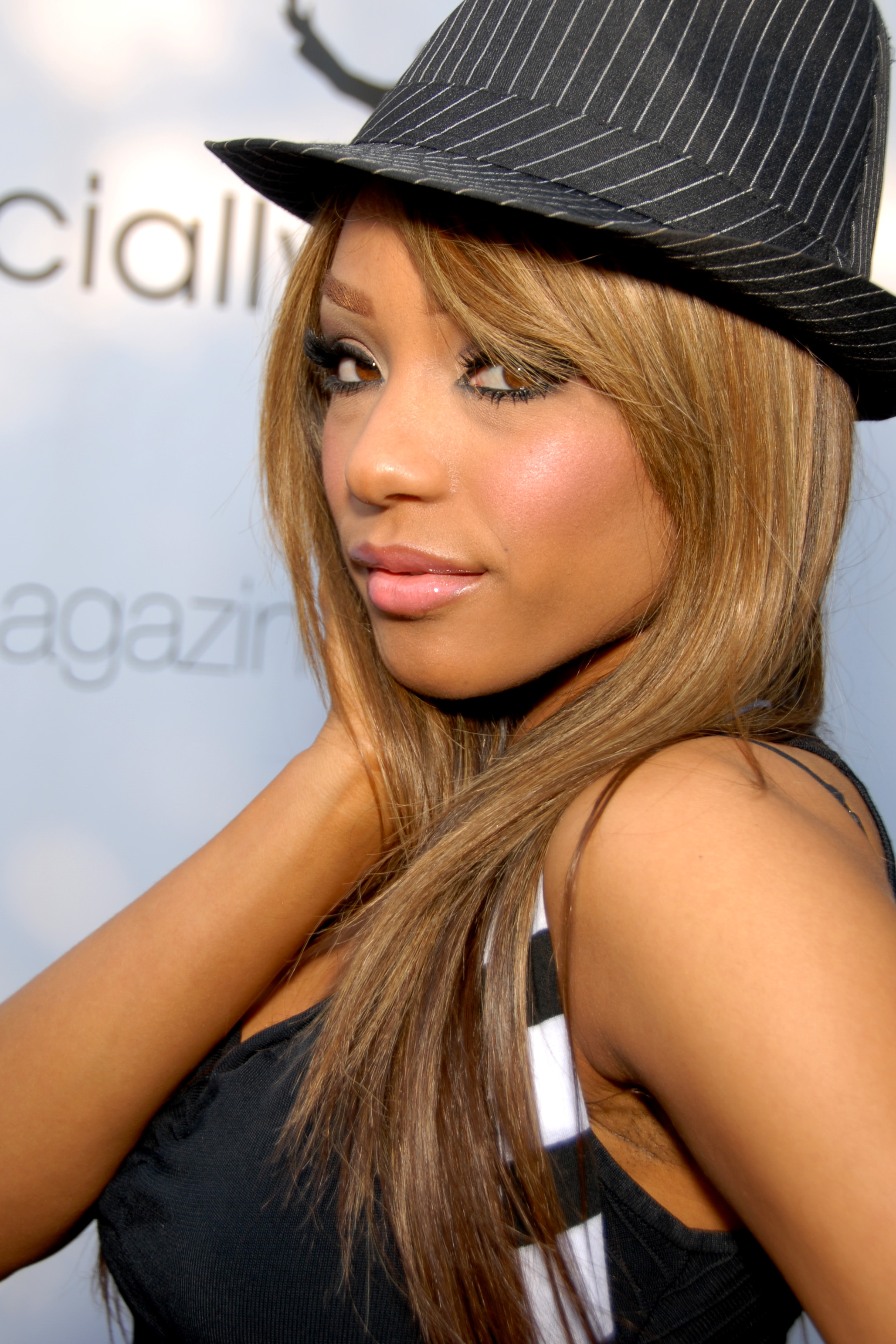
Sayers left the group with fellow member Mejia in 2011.

Chrystina Lauren Sakamoto Sayers (born August 14, 1986) is from San Diego, California. She is of Jamaican, Irish, African American, Japanese and Native American descent. She was encouraged to audition for the show by Lamount Pete, a casting director who had heard some of her songs at a recording studio. After winning her spot in the group she joined other members to form Girlicious.

Chrystina announced her departure in early February 2011, later telling VIBE Vixen in September 2012 that her reason was because she felt Girlicious "was over when Natalie had her cocaine charge. I really thought she was going to go to jail. I honestly didn't want to be affiliated with someone like that. Then everything started to get better when we were working on our second album but then one of the girl's behavior started to get erratic. I had to question if this was going to continue because it was getting out of control."

On January 29, 2012, it was revealed that Sayers was set to join the new fourth line-up of the Pussycat Dolls. However, on April 13, 2012, it was announced that Sayers was no longer a part of the project. She released her debut solo single, "Alive", on September 28, 2012. Her debut solo EP "LEO" was released on September 8, 2016, on iTunes, Spotify, Apple Music, etc. On January 18, 2018, she released a snippet of a song called "Whoa" that is set to be featured on an upcoming release.

=== Nichole Cordova ===
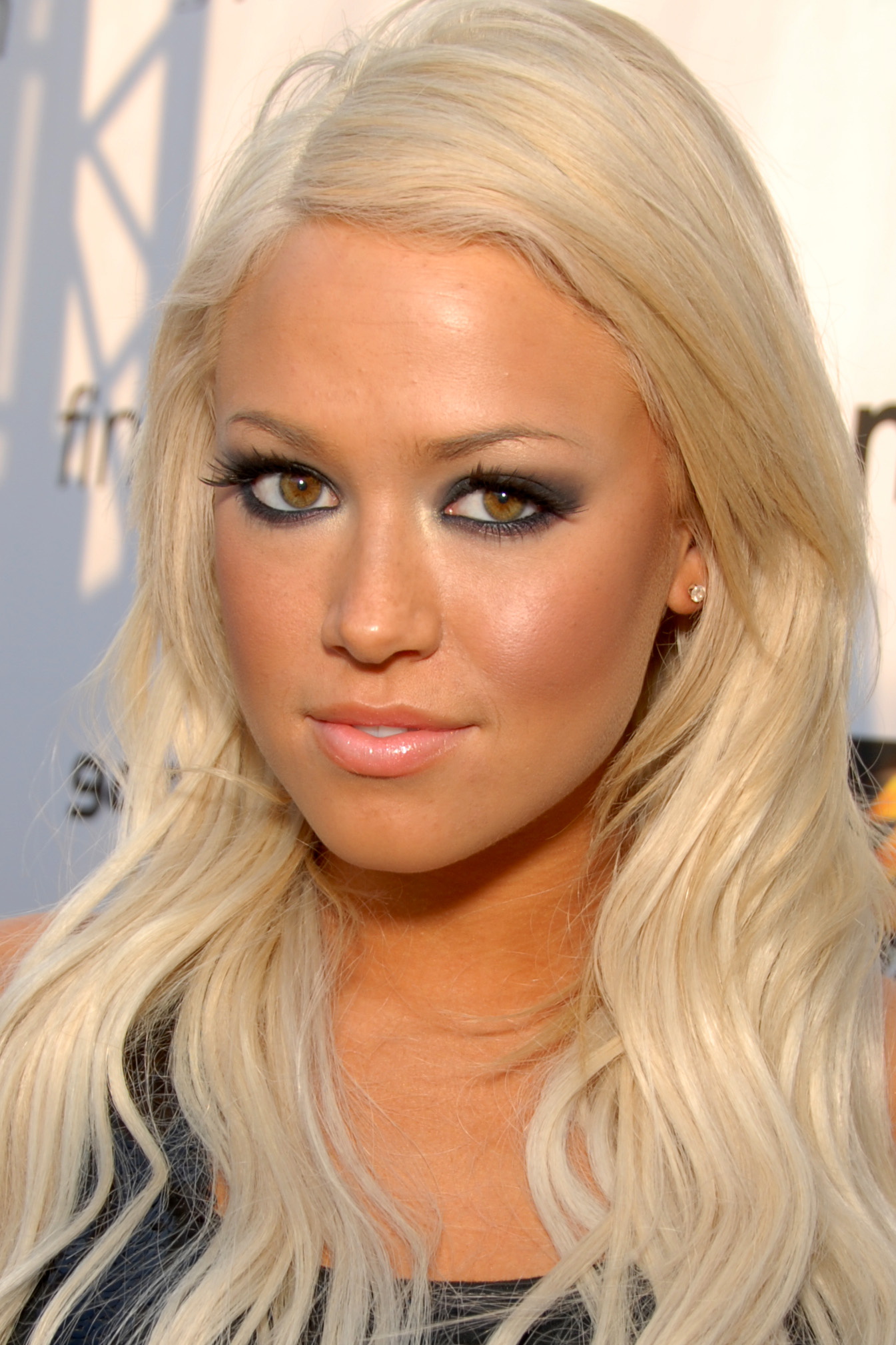
Nichole Cordova in 2009.

Nichole Marie Cordova (born August 17, 1988) is from Houston, Texas, where she has been singing since the age of four. She was offered a chance to start recording her very first demo at the age of 14. In 2007, Nichole recorded over 50 songs in the hopes of releasing her own album. Aside from singing, she is also a trained ballet dancer and teacher for over ten years. Cordova cites Jill Scott, Beyoncé and Christina Aguilera as musical influences.

Nichole Cordova performed her first solo performance with the En Vogue's version of "Something He Can Feel" on the season finale of Pussycat Dolls Present: Girlicious, where she became the first member of Girlicious. She received high praise from the judges for her performance of "Something He Can Feel" with them describing it as "unexpected" and solid. Cordova landed the lead female role in Dutch Marich's horror film Bleed Out as Taylor. On June 17, 2011, Cordova performed alongside Carmen Electra on the Pussycat Dolls Burlesque Revue Tour. In 2013, she appeared on The X Factor USA, with a group called Girls United. The trio reached the four-chair challenge in the competition, where they were eliminated. Cordova got engaged to her unknown boyfriend after 5 years of dating on October 21, 2016, in Italy. In 2024, Cordova performed "Like Me" with drag queen Priyanka in Toronto.

=== Tiffanie Anderson ===
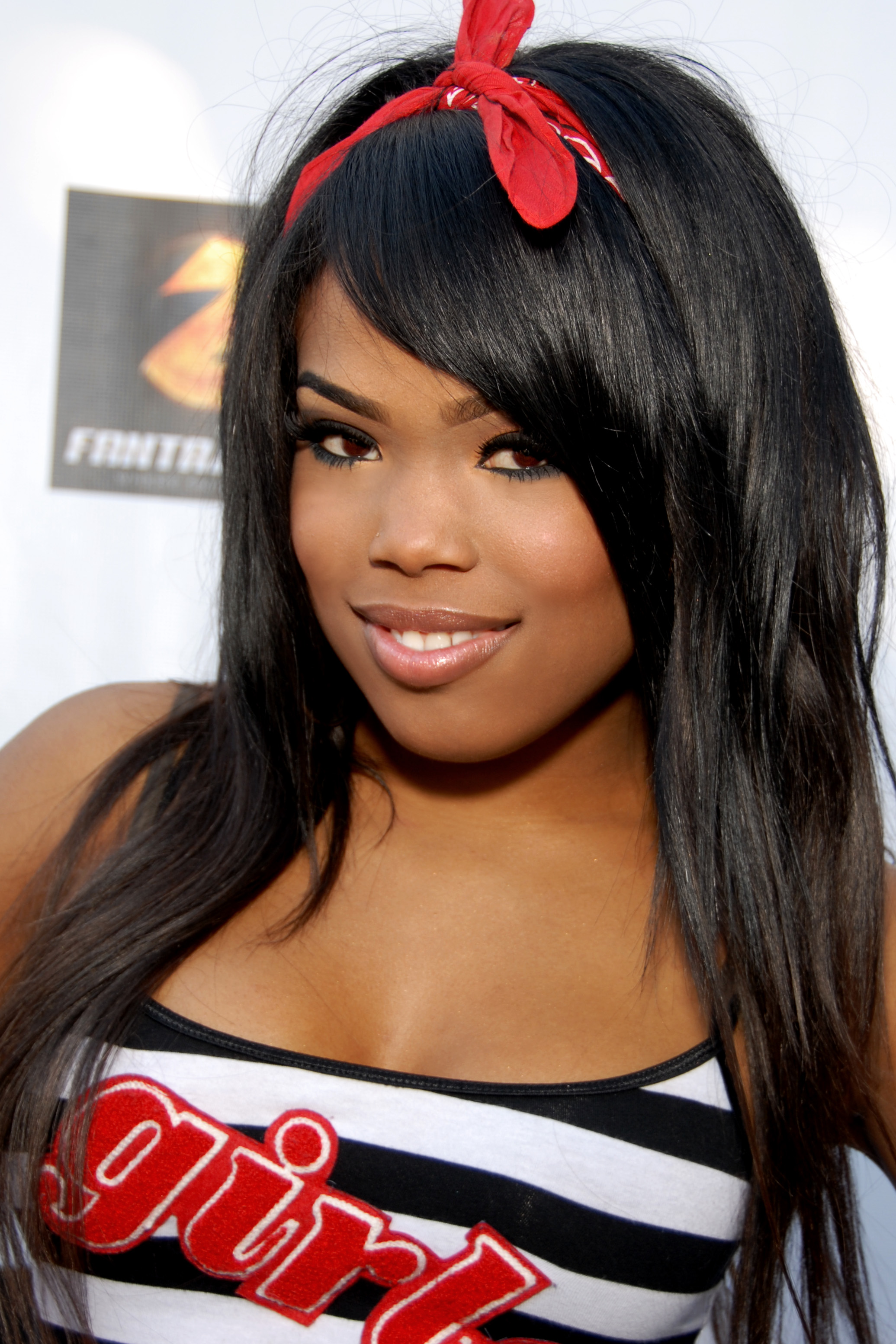
Anderson was a member from 2008 to 2009 before her departure.

Tiffanie Adair Anderson (born August 15, 1988) is a singer and dancer from Los Angeles, California. During her time on the reality show, she and Cordova were the only two contestants to have never made it into the bottom two. During the finale of Pussycat Dolls Present: Girlicious, she became the second member of Girlicious. On June 11, 2009, via a YouTube video, Anderson revealed that she was no longer a member of Girlicious, citing changes with their new record label and sound. Tiffanie is now a visual artist, having reached over 100k followers on her Instagram page theprettyartist.

=== Natalie Mejia ===
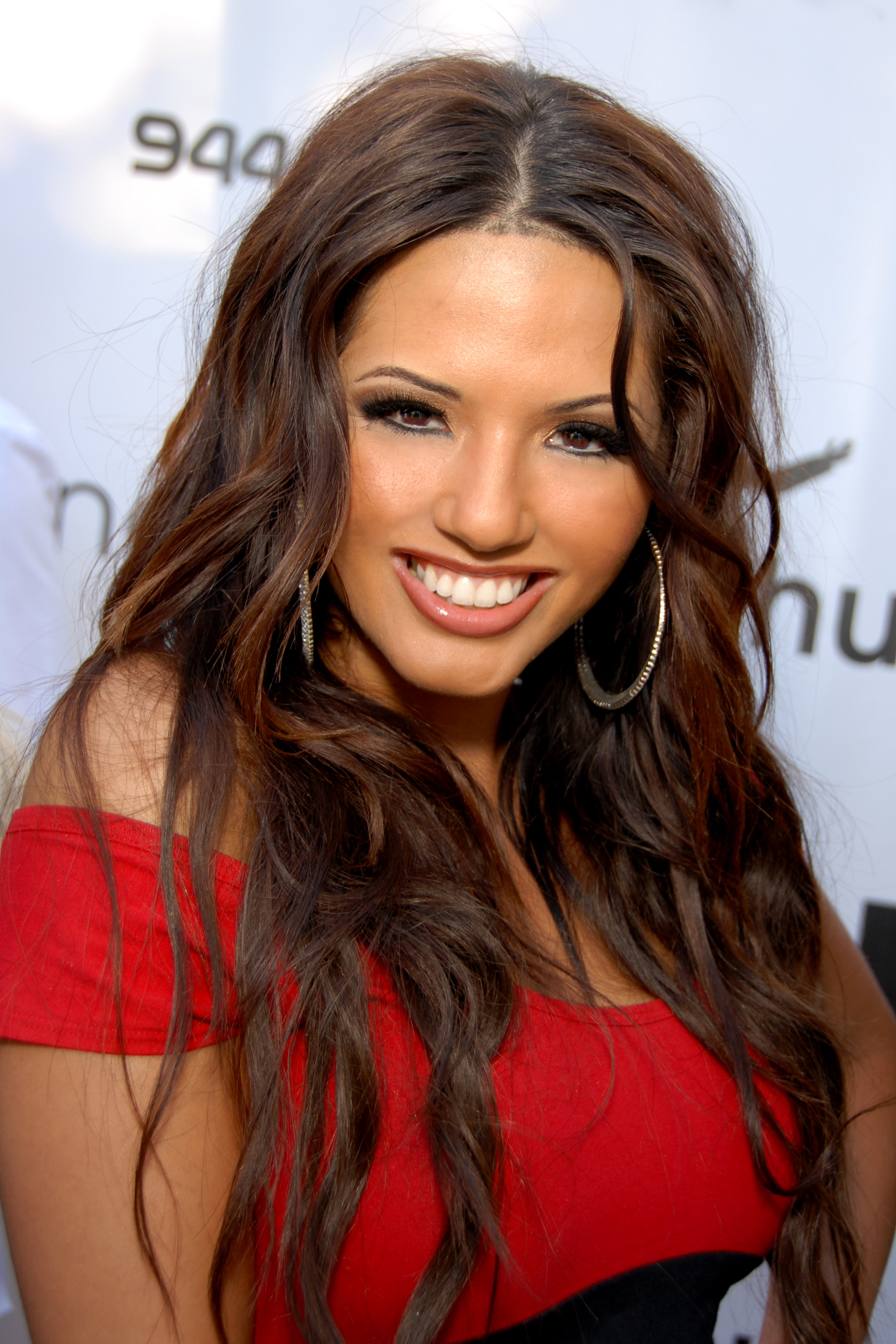
Mejia left the group with fellow member Sayers in 2011.

Natalie Nicole Mejia (born May 7, 1988) is from Diamond Bar, California. She was born in West Covina, California. Mejia is of Mexican and Cuban descent. Her musical idols are Janet Jackson and Jennifer Lopez. She attended Diamond Ranch High School and was a graduate for the Class of 2006. She studied dancing from the age of nine at the Millennium Dance Complex. She won her position in the group in the season finale along with Tiffanie Anderson, Chrystina Sayers and Nichole Cordova. Before Girlicious, she was a member of two musical groups: Cherri, of which she was a member from 2001 until 2003 and then Breathe, which formed in 2005 and disbanded in 2007. Breathe was an opening act for Sean Paul. After two albums with the group she announced her departure along with Sayers in February 2011. After leaving the band, she was due to join a new group but the project fell through as Randy Jackson decided to focus on American Idol and Mariah Carey's new album.

As of July 2012, Mejia had been confirmed as one of the five new Pussycat Dolls. It is thought she was drafted in as a replacement for Chrystina. However, in November 2012 it was revealed that Mejia was no longer a part of the group and was instead replaced by Emmalyn Estrada.

In June 2012 she married her boyfriend, Johnny Roberts. On December 1, 2012, Mejia revealed that she was expecting her first child and due to her situation she made a choice not to continue as a part of the Pussycat Dolls. On May 11, 2013, Mejia gave birth to a daughter, Calista Estrella. Mejia and Roberts split in 2014 for unknown reason.

In 2014, Mejia announced the formation of a new group with her sisters, Jazzy and Taylor, called The Mejia Sisters. Their debut single "Stray" was released on August 18, 2014. The band split and Natalie continued in solo career. Mejia released her debut solo EP "L.O.V.E." (an acronym for Living On Vibrational Energy) on July 7, 2016, on iTunes worldwide with following single "Clumsy".

On May 25, 2016, she announced that she got engaged to her boyfriend, Joel Cruz by Jamaican Sea. They married on January 8, 2017, and in March announced that they are expecting a child in fall. She gave birth on 12 October 2017 to a son, Joel Zion. Since December 2017 she's been on hiatus on social media. On June 26, 2019, Natalie's sister Jazzy Mejia posted Instagram maternity shoot of Natalie and her husband announcing her 3rd pregnancy.

== Discography ==
- Girlicious (2008)
- Rebuilt (2010)

== Tours ==
Headlining

- The Girlicious Tour (2008–2009)

As opening act

- Backstreet Boys – Unbreakable Tour (2008)
- Britney Spears – The Circus Starring Britney Spears (2009)

== Awards and nominations ==
Year	Award	Category	Result
2008	Teen Choice Award	Choice Music: Breakout Group	Nominated
2009	MuchMusic Video Award	Most Watched Music Video on MuchMusic.com (for "Like Me")	Won

== See also ==
- Pussycat Dolls Present: Girlicious
- Pussycat Dolls
- Robin Antin
- Paradiso Girls
- G.R.L.
- List of girl groups
