= Like Me (Girlicious song) =

2008 single by Girlicious

- Digital EP cover

Single by Girlicious

from the album Girlicious
- B-side: "Stupid Shit"
- Released: April 22, 2008
- Genre: Pop; R&B; hip-hop
- Length: 2:52
- Label: Geffen
- Songwriters: Phalon Alexander; Esther Dean; Cedric Williams
- Producer: Jazze Pha

Girlicious singles chronology
"Like Me" (2008)	"Stupid Shit" (2008)

"Like Me" is the debut single by American girl group Girlicious. It was released on April 22, 2008, in the United States and Canada, as the lead single from the album.

== Release ==
On iTunes, "Like Me" was released on April 22, 2008, one day prior to The CW's airing of the finale, allowing many fans to find out who won before the finale aired. A 1:30 preview of the song was released on their official website on April 22, 2008. On September 19, 2008, the single was sent to radio in India.

== Chart performance ==
Without being sent to radio or a physical release, the single managed to debut at number two on the US Bubbling Under Hot 100 Singles and number seventy on the Pop 100 solely based on digital sales. In addition, during the week of May 1, 2008, "Like Me" debuted at number four on the Canadian Hot 100, becoming an instant hit in Canada.

== Music video ==
The music video for "Like Me" was directed by Steven Antin and premiered following the season finale, alongside "Stupid Shit". The video features Girlicious in a boxing ring dancing with the song's producer Jazze Pha.

In the 2009 MuchMusic Video Awards, it won the Most Watched Video on MuchMusic category, with "Stupid Shit" coming in second place.

== Accolades ==
Year	Nominee / work	Award	Result
2009	"Like Me"	Most Watched Video on Muchmusic.com	Won

== Charts ==
=== Weekly charts ===
Chart (2008)	Peak position
Canada (Canadian Hot 100)	4
US Bubbling Under Hot 100 Singles (Billboard)	2
US Digital Songs (Billboard)	55

=== Year-end charts ===
Chart (2008)	Position
Canada (Canadian Hot 100)	96

== Certifications ==
Region	Certification	Certified units/sales
Canada (Music Canada) Ringtone	Gold	20,000^{*}
Canada (Music Canada) with "Stupid Shit"	Gold	20,000^{*}
^{*} Sales figures based on certification alone.

== Release history ==
Region	Date	Format
United States	April 22, 2008	Digital download
Canada	April 22, 2008	Digital download
