= Stupid Shit =

Single by Girlicious

from the album Girlicious
- A-side: "Like Me"
- Released: April 22, 2008
- Recorded: 2008
- Genre: Electropop; hip hop
- Length: 3:08
- Label: Geffen
- Songwriters: Beau Dozier; Stefanie Ridel
- Producers: Beau Dozier; Stefanie Ridel

Girlicious singles chronology
"Like Me" (2008)	"Stupid Shit" (2008)	"Baby Doll" (2008)

"Stupid Shit" is the second single from the American girl group Girlicious's debut self-titled studio album, Girlicious (2008). It was digitally released to iTunes on April 22, 2008, in the United States and Canada. After the departure of Tiffanie Anderson, Nichole Cordova started performing her parts.

== Chart performance ==
Without being sent to radio, the single debuted at number 20 on the Canadian Hot 100 solely from digital downloads before finally dropping off after ten weeks.

== Music video ==
The music video for "Stupid Shit" was directed by Robin Antin and Mikey Minden and premiered alongside "Like Me", following the season finale of Pussycat Dolls Present: Girlicious. The video features Girlicious in school girl uniforms running around, dancing and stripping. During the stripping scene of the video, the Paradiso Girls and Vegas Dolls can be seen amongst the background girls. The video debuted on the MuchMusic Countdown at number 29 and peaked at number one where it stayed for one week.

== Accolades ==
Year	Nominee / work	Award	Result
2009	"Stupid Shit"	Most Watched Video on Muchmusic.com	Nominated

== Charts and certifications ==
=== Charts ===
Chart (2008)	Peak position
Canada (Canadian Hot 100)	20

=== Certifications ===
Region	Certification	Certified units/sales
Canada (Music Canada) with "Like Me"	Gold	20,000^{*}
^{*} Sales figures based on certification alone.

== Release history ==
Region	Date	Format
United States	April 22, 2008	Digital download
Canada	April 22, 2008	Digital download
United States	April 2008	Vinyl
