= Jess Folley =

English singer-songwriter and actress (born 2003)

- Born: 11 May 2003 (age 23); Brentwood, Essex, England
- Occupations: Singer-songwriter; actress
- Years active: 2017–present
- Musical career
- Genres: Pop
- Instrument: Vocals
- Formerly of: RLY

Jess Folley (born 11 May 2003) is an English singer-songwriter and actress. She won the first series of ITV1's The Voice Kids in 2017, after which she went on to compete in The X Factor: The Band as part of girl group RLY. The group won the competition, after which they released an extended play, Generation. Folley has since portrayed the role of Ali in the stage musical Burlesque and Éponine in Les Misérables.

== Life and career ==
Folley was born on 11 May 2003 in Brentwood, Essex. There, she attended St Martin's School. She then attended the East London Arts and Music Academy. In 2017, Folley was a contestant on the first series of ITV1's The Voice Kids. Coached by singer Pixie Lott at age 14, she went on to win the competition. Then in 2019, she auditioned for The X Factor: The Band, after which she was put into the girl group RLY. They went on to win the series. Folley expressed that the group intended on releasing a musical project that was "new and original" and writing for it started in 2020. Their first and only extended play (EP), Generation, was released in 2023.

In 2022, Folley became involved with the stage production Burlesque, an adaptation of the 2010 film by Steven Antin starring Christina Aguilera. She wrote the opening song for the main character, Ali Rose, "Got It All From You". Folley was then invited to portray the role in the workshop, after which she was then cast in the lead role for the show's opening in 2024 at the Manchester Opera House. After a successful run and a short transfer to Glasgow, she was announced to be reprising the role on the West End at the Savoy Theatre. In 2026, she was cast as Éponine in Les Misérables at the Sondheim Theatre.

== Discography ==
=== Extended plays ===
Title	Details
18&Anxious	Released: 27 June 2025; Label: Independent; Formats: Streaming, digital download

=== Singles ===
Title	Year	Album
"Chasing Shadows"	2019	Non-album singles
"Got It Bad"	2019	Non-album singles
"I Love"	2019	Non-album singles
"Where the Women?"	2026	TBA

== Stage ==
Year	Title	Role	Venue	Ref.
2024–2025	Burlesque	Ali Rose	Savoy Theatre, West End; King's Theatre, Glasgow and Manchester Opera House	
2026	Les Misérables	Éponine	Sondheim Theatre	
