= RLY =

English-Irish girl group

- Also known as: Real Like You
- Origin: Birmingham, England
- Years active: 2019–2024
- Labels: Syco; Warner
- Past members: Halle Williams; Virginia Hampson; Kellimarie Willis; Jess Folley; Kyra West; Seorsia Jack; Luena Martinez

RLY (an acronym for Real Like You) was an English pop girl group band formed on The X Factor: The Band. They went on to win the series, subsequently signing to Syco Music, before moving to Real / Darco Recordings in August 2022. The group was composed of Halle Williams, Virginia Hampson, Kellimarie Willis, Jess Folley and Kyra West. On 3 August 2023, the group released their debut single "Love Me Or Not".

== History ==
In November 2019, each member of RLY auditioned for the ITV talent competition series The X Factor: The Band. Each member progressed to the bootcamp stage, where Jess Folley (who in 2017 had won The Voice Kids), Luena Martinez (who appeared in series 13), Seorsia Jack, Halle Williams and Kellimarie Willis (who in 2017 appeared on Got What It Takes?) were selected to be in the group. However, judge Nicole Scherzinger later called Virginia Hampson back, giving her a place in the group. On 15 December 2019, RLY were announced as the winners, winning a record deal with Syco. As part of the competition they performed an original song, "Be Like Them". Unlike winners of The X Factor and The X Factor: Celebrity, RLY are the first winners of a British version of the show not to release a winners single following their win.

After their win on The X Factor: The Band, Folley expressed that the group intend on releasing an album that is "new and original", and writing for the album started in January 2020. On 29 August 2020, Seorsia announced her departure from the group, stating that she wanted to pursue a solo career. On 9 August 2022, Martinez's departure from RLY was announced and the group became signed to Warner Records. On 2 January 2023, a new member, Kyra West, was announced on the groups social media pages.

On 6 January 2023, the group teased new music with an unreleased demo called "Love Me Or Not", which was uploaded to their SoundCloud. The song was later finalised and released on 3 August 2023 as the groups debut single through Real / Darco Recordings. On 21 September 2023, RLY released the song "Superpower". They followed it with the singles "Safe & Sound" and "Ring The Alarm". Their debut EP, Generation, was released on 18 April 2024. On 28 May 2024, RLY released the single "Restroom Booth Confessions". In June 2024, Hampson announced that the group had decided to disband, and that the members would all pursue solo careers.

== Members ==
Seorsia Jack was born in Dublin, Ireland, to Zimbabwean parents. She started her career as a solo female artist in 2019. She announced her departure from the band on 29 August 2020 on Instagram, after deciding to pursue a solo career.

Luena Martinez was born in East Finchley, England. In 2016, Martinez auditioned for the thirteenth series of The X Factor, where she made it to the six chair challenge, but failed to proceed further. She attended SoundSkool in Enfield. Her departure from the band was announced on 9 August 2022; she later adopted the stage name FranQi, and joined KYNO and Loud LDN.

Halle Williams was born in Cambridge, England. Williams is a trained dancer, having studied dance and musical theatre at Urdang Academy.

Virginia Hampson was born in Chelmsford, England. Hampson has no formal vocal training. Upon her initial audition for The X Factor: The Band, she was told to audition again, at a later point in the day. At the second audition round, she was cut from the band; Nicole Scherzinger called her three days later and added her to the band.

Kellimarie Willis was born in Coventry, England. In 2017, Willis competed in the second series of Got What It Takes? winning a sing-off and advanced to the semi-final, at the age of 13. Willis is studying songwriting in Birmingham.

Jess Folley was born in Brentwood, Essex, England. In 2017, Folley won the first series of The Voice Kids.

Kyra West was born in London, England. was announced as a new member in January 2023; she had previously been a semi-finalist on the 2017 series of Got What It Takes?.

== Discography ==
=== Extended plays ===
Title	Details
Generation	Released: 18 April 2024; Label: Real Recordings / Darco Recordings; Formats: digital download, Streaming

=== Singles ===
Title	Year	Album
"Love Me or Not"	2023	Generation
"Superpower"	2023	Generation
"Safe & Sound"	2024	Generation
"Ring the Alarm"	2024	Generation
"Restroom Booth Confessions"	2024	Non-album single

Awards and achievements
Preceded by Megan McKenna	Winner of The X Factor; 2019	Succeeded by None
