= Tilly Lockey =

British amputee with bionic arms

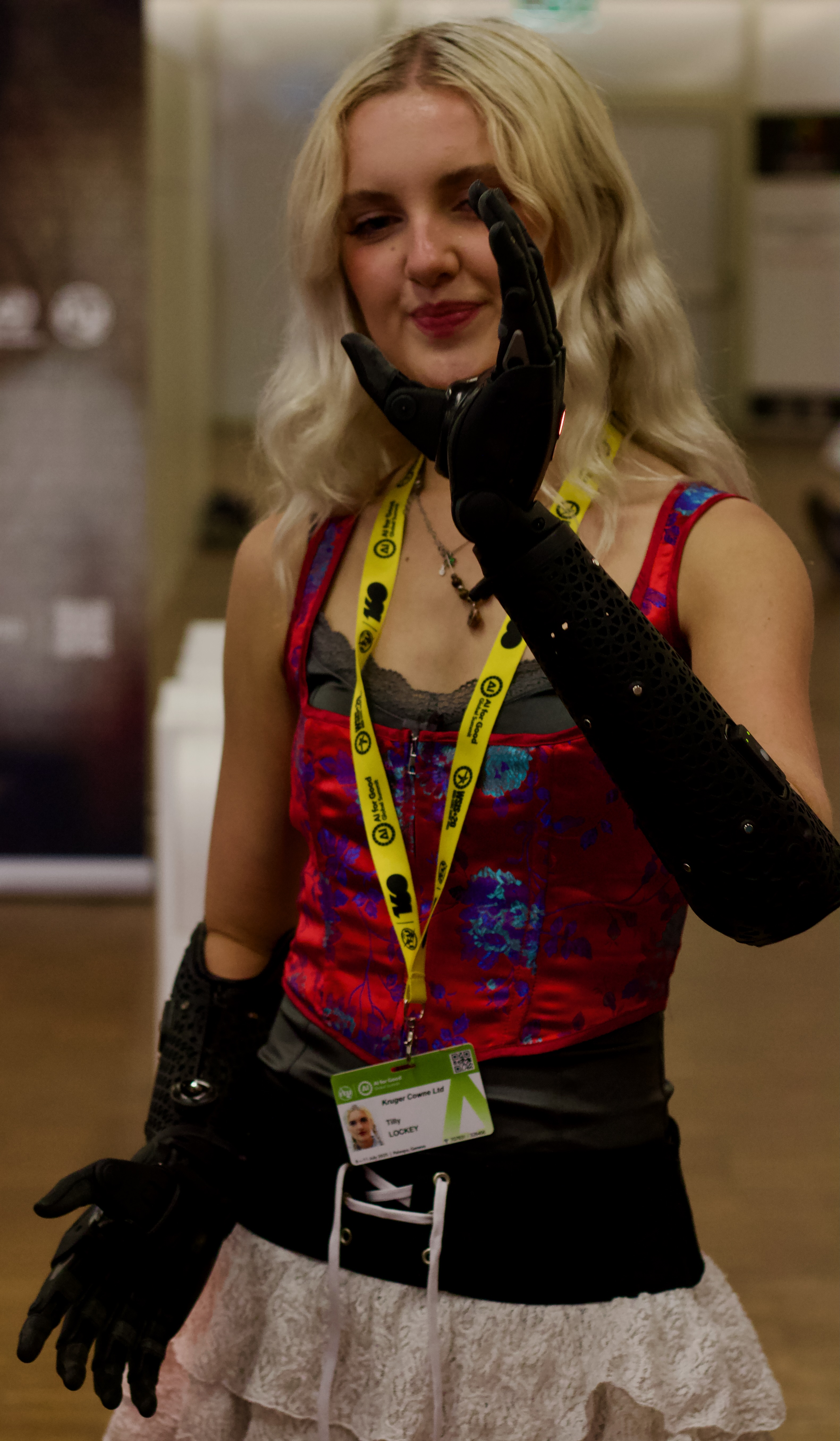
- Lockey at AI for Good in 2025
- Born: Tilly Summers Lockey; 7 October 2005 (age 21)
- Television: Got What It Takes?

Tilly Summers Lockey (born 7 October 2005) is a British social media personality and amputee known for her bionic arms developed by Open Bionics, which she has used since 2016. In 2021, she competed in, and went on to win, the sixth series of the CBBC competition series Got What It Takes?.

== Life and career ==
Lockey contracted meningococcal septicaemia as a baby in 2007, at the age of 15 months. Despite her parents being told that she was likely to die, Lockey survived following a successful operation to have both forearms and her toes amputated.

Lockey was initially provided with simple prosthetics from the NHS. While researching 3D printing, Lockey's mother discovered Open Bionics, who were looking for a below-the-elbow amputee to trial new prosthetic arms. Since being chosen in 2016, Lockey has used bionic arms developed by the company, which enable her to perform actions such as picking up small objects and playing video games. These arms are the first of their kind to be medically approved in Britain.

In 2014, Lockey's custom-made bicycle was stolen; it was recovered four days later and two people were charged.

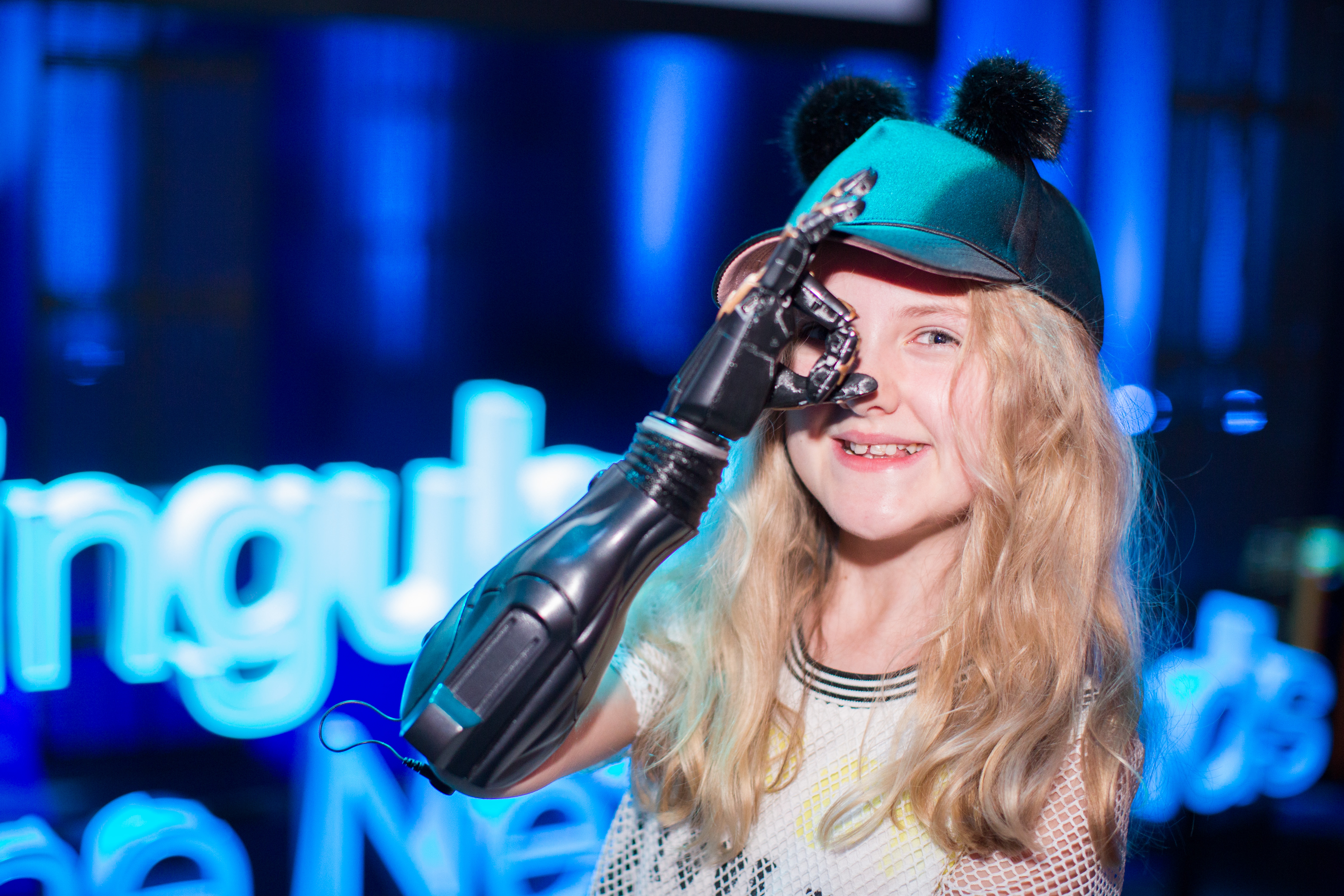
Lockley at age 11 (2016)

One set of arms used by Lockey was based on the Deus Ex video game series. In 2019, she received new custom arms designed by the team creating Alita: Battle Angel.

Lockey has created and shared make-up tutorials online, and presented on the children's news show FYI on Sky. She featured in the video for Kate Nash's song Bad Lieutenant in 2019.

In 2021, Lockey competed in the sixth series of the CBBC competition series Got What It Takes?. On 6 July 2021, she was announced as the winner of the series.

In 2023 she hosted her own show at Sunderland university radio station Spark Sunderland and in 2024 was hosting the "Tuesday Hometime" drive time show.

In 2026, she served on the national jury for the United Kingdom in the Eurovision Song Contest 2026.
