= Burlesque (musical) =

2024 musical based on the film

- A Big New Musical
- Promotional Logo
- Music: Christina Aguilera; Sia; Diane Warren; Todrick Hall; Jess Folley
- Lyrics: Christina Aguilera; Sia; Diane Warren; Todrick Hall; Jess Folley
- Book: Steven Antin; Kate Wetherhead (additional material)
- Basis: Burlesque by Steven Antin
- Premiere: 13 June 2024: Manchester Opera House
- Productions: 2024 Manchester 2024 Glasgow 2025 West End

Burlesque is a musical with a book by Steven Antin and additional material by Kate Wetherhead, and music and lyrics by Christina Aguilera, Sia, Diane Warren, Todrick Hall, and Jess Folley. It is based on Antin's 2010 film.

The musical's story centers on Ali Rose, an aspiring singer, who leaves her small hometown for New York in search for her mother; she becomes a dancer at a burlesque club.

Directed and choreographed by Nick Winston, the original production of Burlesque played in Manchester, England, at the Manchester Opera House in June and October 2024, and in Glasgow, Scotland, at the Theatre Royal in September of the same year. The show made its West End debut at the Savoy Theatre in London in July 2025.

== Plot ==
=== Act One ===
Sean, the emcee of the show, introduces us to the Burlesque Lounge, a burlesque venue in New York, owned by Tess ("Welcome to Burlesque"). We are also introduced to the stars of the lounge: Daphne, Queenie, twins Spring and Summer, Sophia and Nikki, who is late again, so Tess finishes the number instead.

In her small town in Iowa, Ali is rehearsing with her choir ("Something's Got A Hold On Me") and she keeps stepping out of line, loudly riffing to the song. Ali confides in Miss Loretta, her choir teacher, and shows her a letter from her recently deceased mother with information about her biological mother, Theresa. Miss Loretta encourages Ali to travel to New York to meet her. After sending her a letter, Ali gets on a bus to the Big Apple, hoping to find her place ("Got It All From You").

Back at the Burlesque Lounge the show continues with a couple of short numbers from Dafne ("What Are Clothes") and Queenie ("Pretty Girls Only"). Ali arrives and briefly speaks to Jackson, the bar manager, then sneaks backstage looking for Theresa, now known as Tess, but is rudely dismissed by her, when trying to tell her she's her daughter. Nikki arrives late again and performs her solo after an argument with Tess about always being late and drinking too much ("Sugar Daddy Diet"). In the audience is Vince, Tess's ex-husband and part owner of the Burlesque lounge, who wants for Tess to buy his share of the lounge, but is also dismissed, as Tess has no time nor money for him.

Ali is waiting for Tess after the show, but Jackson reveals she already left and offers Ali to crash on his couch for the night. As they get to know each other more, the two share a classic rom-com moment in Jackson's apartment ("Too Soon"), which ends when Jackson receives a call from his girlfriend Natalie.

The next day, after the twins burlesque number ("Dirty Martini"), Jackson hires Ali as a waitress at the Burlesque, with a warning that Tess hates waitresses whose goal is to star in the Burlesque. While cleaning tables Ali cannot resist but bursting into song ("Don't Make Me Sing"), catching everyone's attention. Sean introduces Ali to the history of burlesque as a genre, after her comment about the Burlesque being a strip club ("Big"). The show-stopping number is interrupted by Tess scolding Sean for overspending and Tray, one of the dancers, for always wearing the girls outfits. Tess shares with Sean that the Burlesque is in deep financial trouble but she is determined to continue fighting ("You Haven't Seen the Last of Me").

After closure, Vince sneaks in Tess's office and finds the final notice from the bank and Ali's letter. He decides to use the information against his ex-wife ("Ammo"). At Jackson's apartment, Ali and Jack are growing closer. Jack walks in on Ali performing one of his songs, she is embarrassed at first, but then asks him to play the song on the keyboard ("Show Me How You Burlesque - pre reprise"). Impressed by her vocal talent, Jack convinces Ali she should be performing at the Burlesque lounge.

The next day when Nikki is late again, she refuses to perform the first number ("Wagon Wheel Watusi") and says she will wait for her solo. This escalates into an argument with Tess, who fires her. During the dance number Vince tells Ali he knows the truth about her. Ali is about to tell Tess the whole truth, when Jack interrupts her and says she should be performing. Tess dares her to sing for the Burlesque audience and Ali surprises everyone with incredible talent ("Tough Lover").

=== Act Two ===
Back at the Burlesque Lounge, Tess has agreed to make some changes to the show, adding new ideas suggested by Ali ("Express"). Ali has grown closer to the girls, is planning a gender reveal party for Sophia's baby and welcomes Tray, who now goes as Chardonnay, into the girls dressing room. A new number is shown, including ("Bump & Grind"), which features a heavily pregnant Sophia.

Vince secretly hears a conversation between Sean and Tess, where she mentions a deposit she has saved for her daughter. He convinces Nikki to impersonate Ali, by stealing her driver's licence and key to the deposit box and collect the money from the bank, while Ali is performing at the Burlesque ("Bad Girl/Good Girl"). After the show, Ali and Tess share a moment backstage, with Tess sharing how she loves the performers as her own daughters and showing Ali how to put on make-up ("Make-Up").

Jack sings a song about Natalie ("Natalie") and the two break-up over the phone. Ali and Jack get together, with Ali also slowly becoming the star of the Burlesque ("Bound to You"). After spending the night together, Jack walks in naked, offering Ali a snack ("Cookie"). Nikki meets with Vince with a briefcase in hand, but, before giving him the money, demands to know what he's hiding. He is reticent at first, but reveals Ali's secret once he sees the briefcase is empty.

With the impending end of the Burlesque, Ali suggests a big night, with new dresses made by Queenie, and new numbers, including one choreographed and inspired by Sean ("Bigger"). Vince lies to Ali saying Tess knew about her all along, but was using her for her talent. He then tells Tess Ali is her daughter and was using her to get onstage. Ali runs away, so the show cannot continue leading to the end of the lounge. Backstage, Tess is heartbroken ("Make-Up (reprise)").

Nikki finds Ali and gives her the money, convincing her to return to the lounge and join her revenge plot against Vince. Nikki has called him to the lounge under false pretence. Tess and Ali join in, making him confess, while Jackson films everything ("Call Mamma Daddy").

Tess and Ali clear the air and everyone welcomes Ali back ("Welcome to Burlesque (reprise)"). Ali insists to use the money for the lounge, as she has finally found a place to call home ("Got it All From You (reprise)"). Three months later the Burlesque lounge is thriving again ("Epilogue") and everyone unites for the final number ("Show Me How You Burlesque").

== Background ==
In 2023, it was announced that Steven Antin was writing and producing a stage musical adaptation of his 2010 film Burlesque. Christina Aguilera, who played the lead role in the film, joined the project as a producer. Aguilera, Sia, and Diane Warren returned to rework the songs they wrote for the original film, while Todrick Hall and Jess Folley were engaged to write new songs.

In November 2023, the musical was officially announced, and producers confirmed that it would have its world premiere in the United Kingdom in 2024.

== Productions ==
=== Manchester and Glasgow (2024) ===
The musical premiered at the Manchester Opera House in Manchester, England, on 13 June 2024, where it ran until 29 June. The show then played at the Theatre Royal in Glasgow, Scotland, from 11 to 28 September 2024, and returned to Manchester from 3 October to 2 November.

The show was directed and choreographed by Nick Winston, and produced by Steven Antin, Christina Aguilera, Adam Paulden, Jason Haigh-Ellery, Sue Gilad, and Larry Rogowsky. Ryan-Lee Seager served as an associate director and choreographer, while Antin's sister, Robin Antin also served as an associate choreographer and a creative co-producer. The musical had costumes by Ryan Dawson Laight, scenic design by Soutra Gilmour, lighting by Jack Knowles, and sound by Ben Harrison.

The original cast featured Jess Folley as Ali Rose, Jackie Burns as Tess, George Maguire as Vince, and Todrick Hall as Sean.

=== West End (2025–2026) ===
The musical played at the Savoy Theatre in London from 10 July until 8 September 2025. Hall directed and choreographed. Hall also reprised his role as Sean along with Folley as Ali, and Maguire as Vince, with Orfeh as Tess, Paul Jacob French as Jackson, and Asha Parker Wallace as Nikki. Actors Equity said that its members raised a "number of issues" about the show.

A UK tour of the production is set to open in August 2026, with Racky Plews directing and Robin Antin and Aaron Renfree choreographing; a planned return to London has been delayed until at least 2027.

== Musical numbers ==
Act I

- "Prologue"
- "Welcome to Burlesque"
- "Something's Got A Hold On Me"
- "Got It All From You"
- "What Are Clothes"
- "Pretty Girls Only"
- "Sugar Daddy Diet"
- "Too Soon"
- "Dirty Martini"
- "Don't Make Me Sing"
- "Big"
- "Masterpiece"†
- "You Haven't Seen The Last of Me"††
- "Ammo"
- "Show Me How You Burlesque (pre reprise)"
- "Wagon Wheel Watusi"
- "Tough Lover"

Act II

- "Express"
- "Bump & Grind"
- "Bad Girl / Good Girl"
- "Make-Up"
- "Natalie"
- "Bound to You"
- "Cookie"
- "Bigger"
- "Make-Up (reprise)"
- "Call Mamma Daddy"
- "Welcome to Burlesque (Reprise)"
- "Got It All From You (Reprise)"
- "Epilogue"
- "Show Me How You Burlesque"

†Only in the song list for London West End previews.

††Replacing "Masterpiece" after London West End previews.

== Cast and characters ==
Character	Manchester	West End
Character	2024	2025
Ali Rose	Jess Folley	Jess Folley
Tess	Jackie Burns	Orfeh
Vince	George Maguire	George Maguire
Sean	Todrick Hall	Todrick Hall
Jackson	Michael Mather	Paul Jacob French
Nikki	Nina Ann Nelson	Asha Parker-Wallace
Sophia	Billie-Kay	Billie-Kay
Trey/Chardoney	Ope Sowande	Jake Dupree
Queenie		Charlotte Jaconelli
Daphne	Jess Qualter	Jess Qualter
Spring	Hollie-Ann Lowe	Hollie-Ann Lowe
