= Burlesque (2010 American film) =

2010 film by Steven Antin

- Theatrical release poster
- Directed by: Steven Antin
- Written by: Steven Antin
- Produced by: Donald De Line
- Starring: Cher; Christina Aguilera; Eric Dane; Cam Gigandet; Julianne Hough; Alan Cumming; Peter Gallagher; Kristen Bell; Stanley Tucci
- Cinematography: Bojan Bazelli
- Edited by: Virginia Katz
- Music by: Christophe Beck
- Production companies: Screen Gems; De Line Pictures
- Distributed by: Sony Pictures Releasing
- Release date: November 24, 2010 (United States)
- Running time: 119 minutes
- Country: United States
- Language: English
- Budget: $55 million
- Box office: $90.5 million

Burlesque is a 2010 American backstage musical film written and directed by Steven Antin. It stars Cher, Christina Aguilera, Kristen Bell, Cam Gigandet, Eric Dane, Stanley Tucci, Julianne Hough, Alan Cumming, and Peter Gallagher, and features cameos from Dianna Agron and James Brolin.

The film tells the story of Ali (Aguilera), an aspiring singer who leaves her small hometown for Los Angeles, where she becomes a dancer at a struggling burlesque lounge owned by Tess (Cher). After a performance is sabotaged by her rival, Nikki (Bell), Ali sings the song herself, impressing Tess and leading to her becoming the main attraction of the lounge.

Burlesque marks Aguilera's first leading role, as well as Cher's first musical performance on screen since 1967's Good Times. Filming for Burlesque took place in California from November 2009 to March 2010. It was released in the United States on November 24, 2010, by Screen Gems. Its jazz-inspired soundtrack was released ahead of the film's release on November 19, 2010, by RCA Records and Screen Gems. Aguilera and Cher both contributed to the album.

The film received mixed reviews from critics, who praised the cast's performance and the soundtrack but criticized the writing. Burlesque did modestly at the box office, grossing $91 million worldwide and earning an additional $42 million in domestic video sales. The film was nominated for Best Motion Picture – Musical or Comedy at the 68th Golden Globe Awards, where Cher's performance of "You Haven't Seen the Last of Me", written by Diane Warren, won for Best Original Song. The soundtrack was nominated for Best Compilation Soundtrack for Visual Media in the 54th Grammy Awards. A stage musical adaptation of the film premiered in June 2024.

== Plot ==
Alice "Ali" Marilyn Rose is a young waitress in Iowa who dreams of becoming a professional dancer ever since losing her mother a few weeks after her seventh birthday. After her selfish boss refuses to pay her salary, she takes what he owes her from the register and moves to LA, where she attends many auditions with little success.

One night, Ali comes across a burlesque club where its owner Tess Scali and an entourage of dancers perform an opening number. She also meets songwriter-bartender Jack Miller at the club's bar. He refers Ali to Tess for an audition, but she tells her to return another time and her assistant Sean ushers her out. Upon seeing their waitress shortage, Ali picks up a tray and begins serving. As a result, she manages to get a job waiting tables at the club.

When Georgia, one of the lead dancers, becomes pregnant, auditions are held in search of her replacement. Ali performs a difficult dance routine and eventually persuades Tess to hire her. This infuriates Nikki, a lead performer struggling with alcoholism.

One night, Ali returns from work to discover that her apartment at the Hotel Roselyn has been burglarized and the money she hid in the toilet tank has been stolen. She seeks help from Jack. He allows her to stay overnight at his apartment. The following morning, Ali discovers that Jack is straight after seeing a photograph of his fiancee. She attempts to leave during a rainstorm, but Jack follows her outside and carries her back into the apartment. He offers to let her stay until she finds another place to live. Ali agrees to contribute to the household expenses on the condition that she gets the bedroom, leaving Jack to sleep on the couch.

Ali replaces Nikki one night to host a performance after the latter is too intoxicated to perform. In a fit of rage, Nikki tries to sabotage it by turning off the music that the dancers usually lip sync to until Ali impresses everyone with her singing skills. Her performance is an instant success, and Tess casts her in an upcoming show. Despite the club's growing popularity, Tess struggles with a bank loan and a lien on her ownership rights of the building.

One night after the club closes, Tess is walking to her car, increasingly worried about her finances when a drunken Nikki shows up, accusing her of betraying their long friendship. In defense of Ali, Tess questions Nikki's lack of gratitude for the help she has received during her binges. In retaliation, the furious dancer quits after revealing to have slept with Tess' ex-husband Vince after their honeymoon. Tess leaves, angrily smashing a window of Nikki's convertible with a crowbar.

Meanwhile, Ali and Jack become romantically attracted. However, he is already engaged to Natalie, an actress working in NYC. Sean encourages Jack to end the engagement, as Ali is a better person than his shallow fiancée. Wealthy clubgoer Marcus Gerber becomes infatuated with Ali, who begins spending time with him, making Jack jealous.

The group later attends Georgia's lavish wedding to Damon, funded by his wealthy father who is delighted he is settling down and with the impending arrival of his grandchild. Jack appears to call off his engagement and gets drunk. That night, he and Ali sleep together.

In the morning, Natalie unexpectedly returns from New York and finds them in bed together. She angrily insists she and Jack never broke up, although he denies this yet asks Ali to leave. Feeling heartbroken and betrayed, Ali runs to Sean for support and learns that he is gay. Marcus calls her, and Sean encourages her to go out with him.

Seeing a model of Marcus' plans to build a skyscraper on the club's property at Marcus' house, Ali realizes that he is not merely interested in the "air rights" above it, as he claims to be. He wants to tear the club down and build a new apartment complex. She tells Tess about his plan, and they pay a visit to the developer of a new million-dollar condo building across the street.

Fearing the obstruction of his prospective purchasers' view, the developer buys the air rights to the club's property from Tess. She then uses the money to buy out Vince's share, pay off the bank, and redecorate the club in her own vision. Later, a sobered Nikki admits that she lied about sleeping with Vince out of anger. They reconcile, and Tess rehires her.

Ali rekindles her relationship with Jack after he tells her that he broke up with Natalie because she cared more about her job than their relationship. Nikki finally accepts Ali, who then performs "Show Me How You Burlesque", a song written by Jack, with all of the dancers on stage, delighting the crowd.

== Cast ==
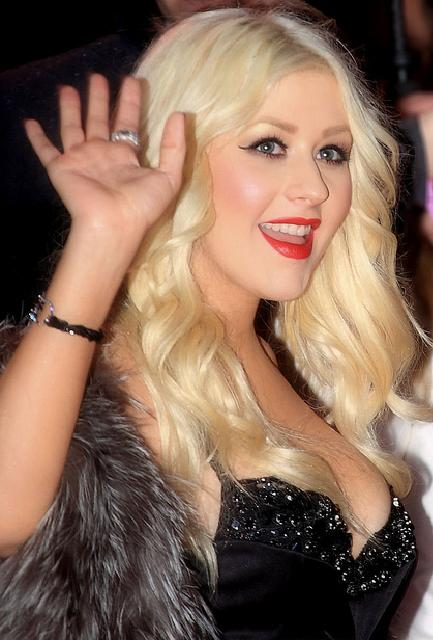
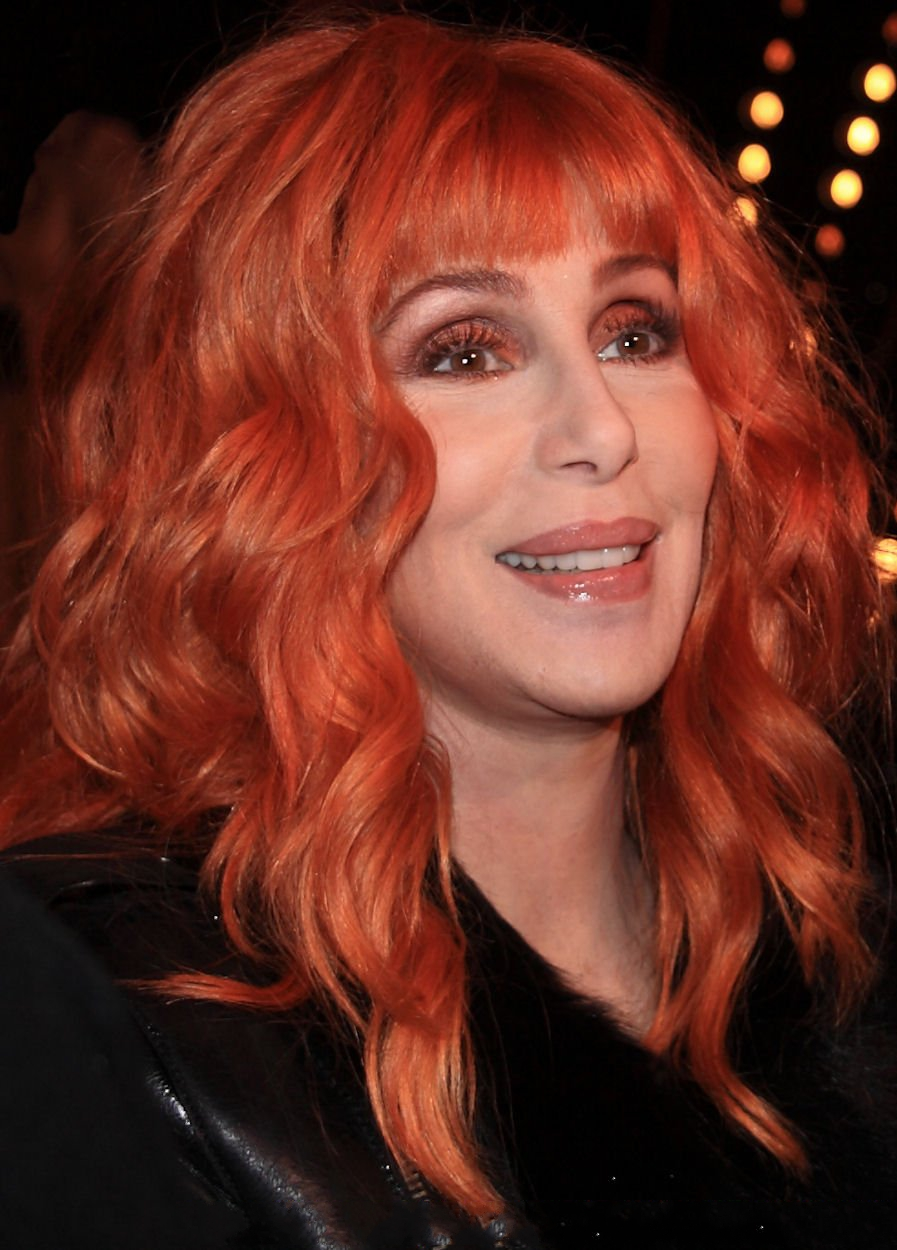
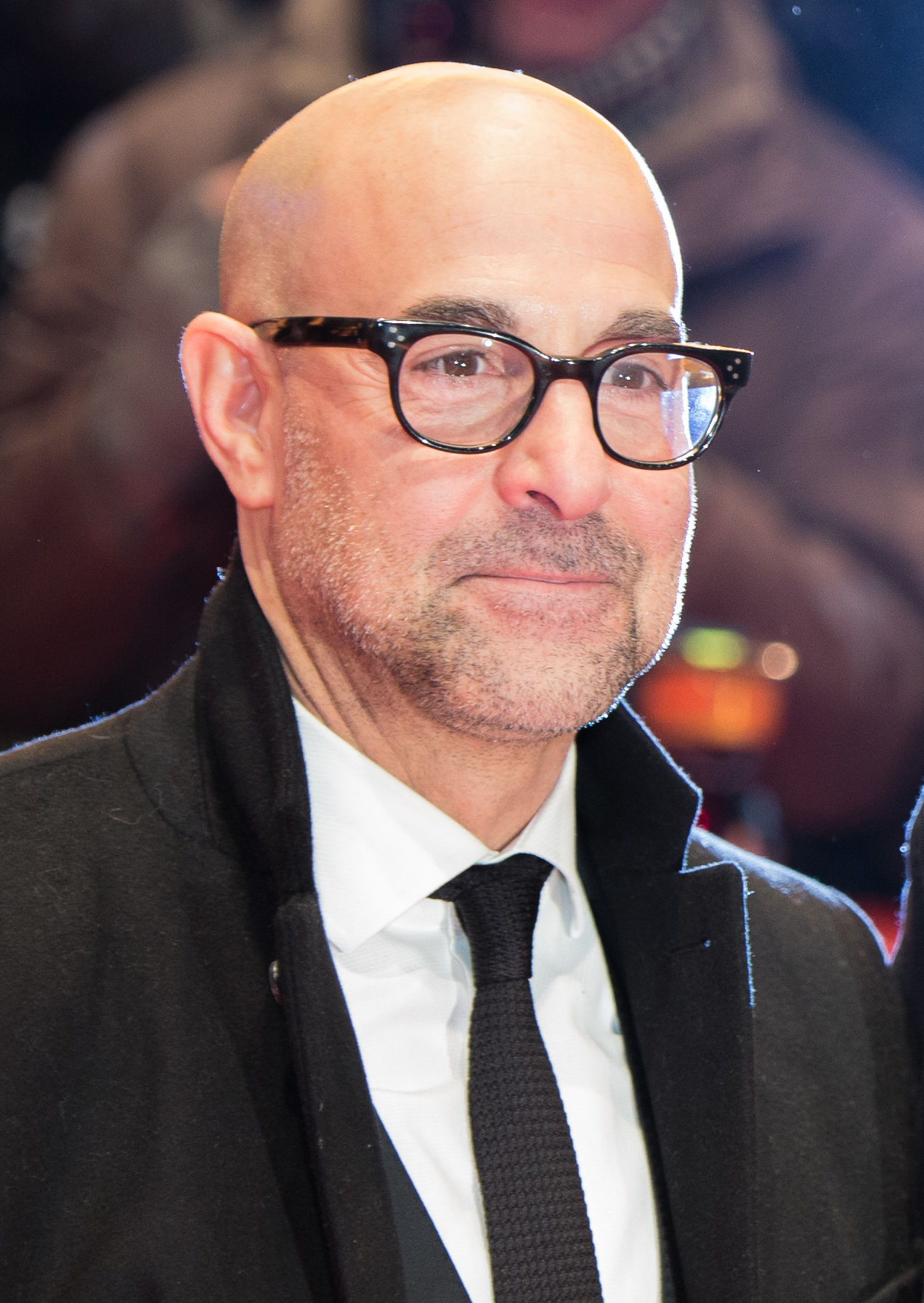
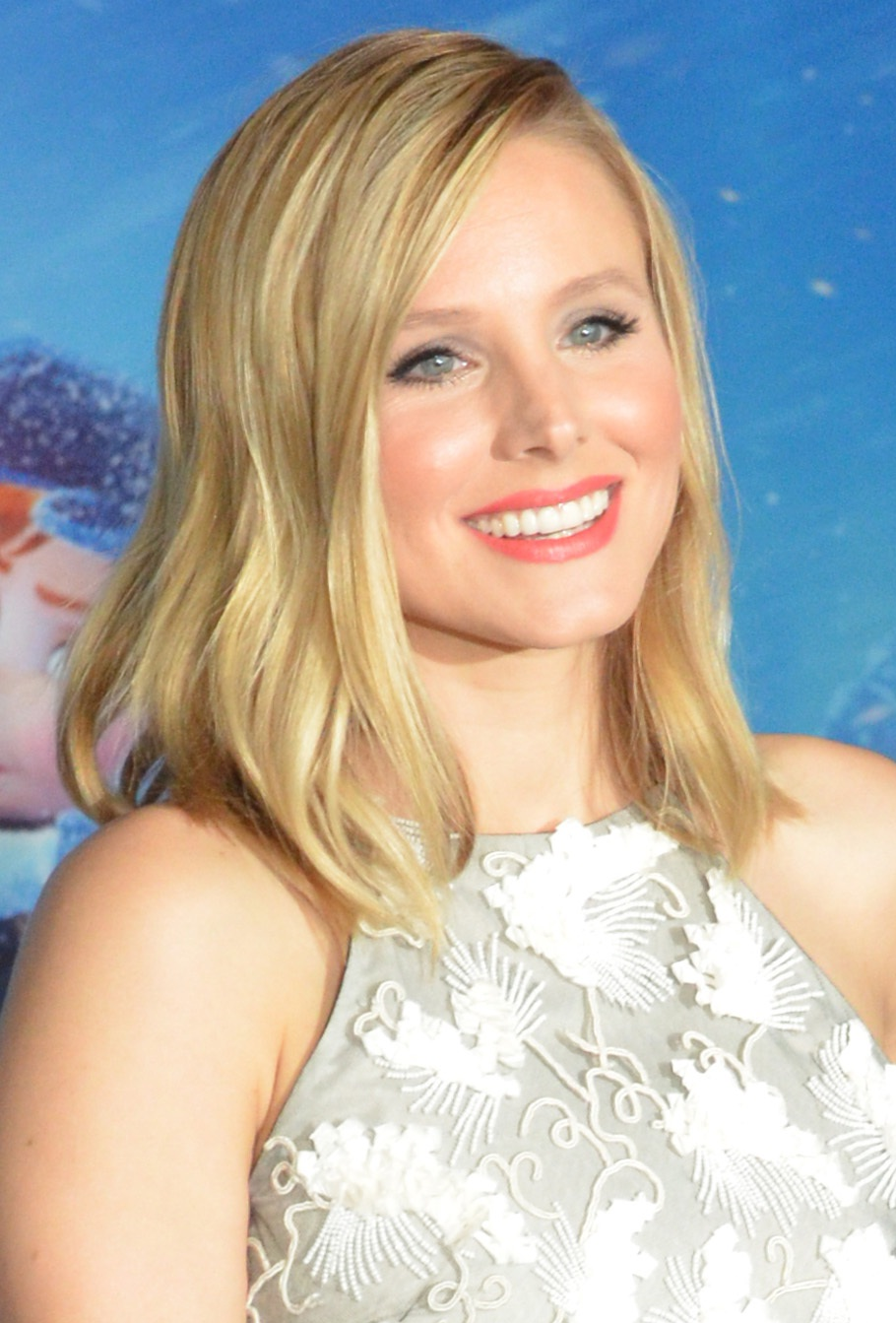
Clockwise, from the top left: Christina Aguilera, Cher, Kristen Bell, and Stanley Tucci.
- Cher as Tess Scali
- Christina Aguilera as Alice Marilyn "Ali" Rose
- Eric Dane as Marcus Gerber
- Cam Gigandet as John "Jack" Miller
- Julianne Hough as Georgia
- Alan Cumming as Alexis
- Peter Gallagher as Vincent "Vince" Scali
- Kristen Bell as Nikki
- Stanley Tucci as Sean
- Dianna Agron as Natalie
- Glynn Turman as Harold Saint
- David Walton as Mark the DJ
- Terrence Jenkins as Dave
- Chelsea Traille as Coco
- Tanee McCall as Scarlett
- Tyne Stecklein as Jesse
- Paula Van Oppen as Anna
- Michael Landes as Greg
- Blair Redford as James / Bumper Band Member
- James Brolin as Mr. Anderson
- Stephen Lee as Dwight

== Production ==
=== Development ===
Steven Antin's sister Robin was a member and creator of the girl band the Pussycat Dolls. Circa 2002, the group performed at the Roxy Theatre, West Hollywood, with many artists—among them Christina Aguilera—and Steven Antin directed some of these shows. The first outline of the screenplay was written by Antin and Clint Culpepper, the Screen Gems' president. It was about "a girl escaping her life", showing up in a neo-burlesque club and launching a career as a performer.

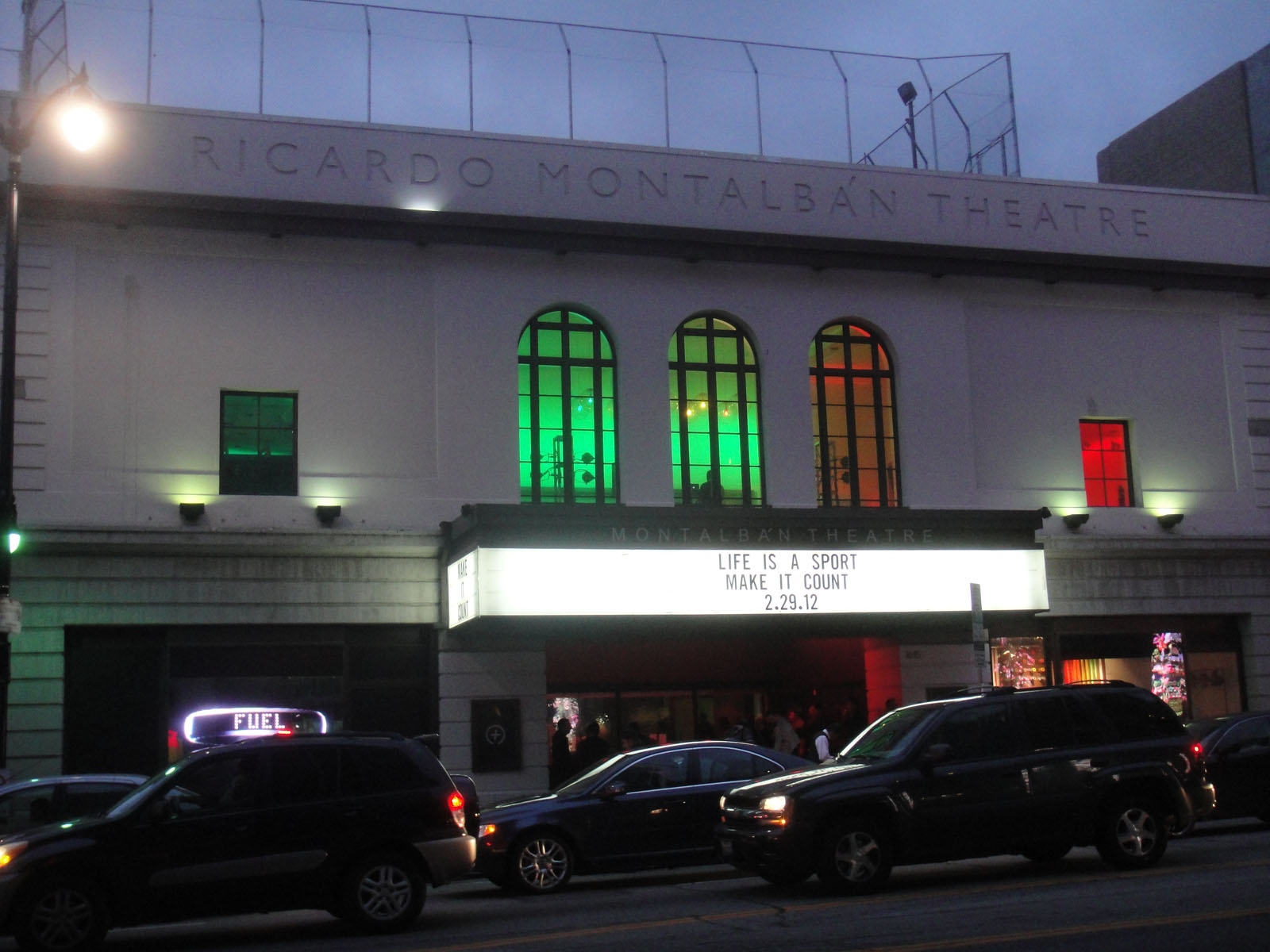
The exterior of the Ricardo Montalbán Theatre served as the "Burlesque Lounge"

Cher accepted the supporting role of Tess Scali because she wanted to sing in a movie and thought this would be her last opportunity to do so. While on the film set, she went on to praise co-star Christina Aguilera's acting abilities, revealing to Entertainment Tonight: "She was keeping up, and she was hot. I mean, it was, like, she was really up there. Her game is good." Canadian actor Shawn Roberts, who was previously cast in another Screen Gems production Resident Evil: Afterlife, was briefly considered for the role of Jack Miller. Lindsay Lohan and Jessica Biel auditioned for the role of Nikki.

=== Filming ===
Burlesque started shooting on November 9, 2009 and ended on March 3, 2010. Although director Steven Antin wrote the original screenplay, Diablo Cody (Juno) revised it uncredited. It was later further revised by Susannah Grant, also uncredited. Burlesque is Screen Gems' most expensive film, with the exception of the Resident Evil films, with costs of $55 million.

Filming locations included the exterior and adjacent parking as the "Burlesque Lounge" of the Ricardo Montalbán Theatre in Hollywood, as well as the interior of the Cathedral of Saint Vibiana.

== Music ==
=== Musical numbers ===
1. "Something's Got a Hold on Me" – Ali and the Burlesque Lounge Troupe (performed by Christina Aguilera)
2. "My Drag" – The Burlesque Lounge Troupe (a song by Deva Dragon & Squirrel Nut Zippers)
3. "Welcome to Burlesque Tango" – The Band
4. "Welcome to Burlesque" – Tess and the Burlesque Lounge Troupe (performed by Cher)
5. "Diamonds Are a Girl's Best Friend (Swing Cats Remix)" –written by Leo Robin and Nikki, Georgia and the Burlesque Lounge Troupe (a song by Leo Robin and Jules Styne for the musical Gentleman Prefer Blondes])
6. "Diamonds Are a Girl's Best Friend" – Ali (outro by Christina Aguilera)
7. "Long John Blues" – Nikki (performed by Megan Mullally)
8. "Nasty Naughty Boy" – Ali (a song by Christina Aguilera/instrumental version)
9. "Wagon Wheel Watusi" – Ali (a song by Elmer Bernstein)
10. "Ray of Light" – The Burlesque Lounge Troupe (a song by Madonna)
11. "That's Life" – Alexis (performed by Alan Cumming; DVD/Blu-ray special feature)
12. "Tough Lover" – The Burlesque Lounge Troupe (a song by Etta James)
13. "Tough Lover" – Ali (performed by Christina Aguilera)
14. "But I Am a Good Girl" – Ali (performed by Christina Aguilera)
15. "A Guy That Takes His Time" – Ali (performed by Christina Aguilera, originally by Mae West)
16. "Express" – Ali and the Burlesque Lounge Troupe (performed by Christina Aguilera)
17. "Jungle Berlin (Instrumental)" – Alexis and The Contortionists
18. "You Haven't Seen the Last of Me" – Tess (performed by Cher)
19. "Bound to You" – Ali (performed by Christina Aguilera)
20. "Show Me How You Burlesque" – Ali and the Burlesque Lounge Troupe (performed by Christina Aguilera)

=== Soundtrack ===
The soundtrack album features ten tracks: eight performed by Aguilera including "Express"; and two performed by Cher which are her first original recordings in 7 years. The soundtrack includes a mix of original and cover songs. Both the ballads from the soundtrack – "Bound to You" performed by Aguilera and "You Haven't Seen the Last of Me" performed by Cher – were nominated for the Golden Globe Award for Best Original Song. Cher's "You Haven't Seen the Last of Me", which was written by Diane Warren, won the award. In the United States, the soundtrack was certified Gold by the RIAA for shipments of 500,000 copies in October 2011.

== Release ==
=== Marketing ===
The theatrical trailer was attached to screenings of Step Up 3D and Easy A. The first TV spot premiered during the season 2 premiere of Fox's Glee on September 21, 2010. A third TV spot also aired the following day during Dancing with the Stars, later followed by another during MTV's Jersey Shore. Several teasers have been released for promotional purposes including the Etta James's "Something's Got a Hold on Me". This was then followed by the track "But I Am a Good Girl" which was released in November 2010.

Aguilera performed "Bound to You" on The Tonight Show with Jay Leno and gave an interview and performance on Conan. Aguilera also gave an interview to show host Chelsea Handler to discuss the film and other subjects. On November 19, 2010, Aguilera also gave a television interview to Ellen DeGeneres. She then performed a track from the soundtrack, the Etta James track "Something's Got a Hold on Me". Aguilera performed "Express" at the American Music Awards of 2010 and "Show Me How You Burlesque" at the Dancing with the Stars finale. She also performed "Express" on the final of the seventh series of The X Factor which received criticism and omplaints for the raunchy content.

=== Home media ===
The DVD and Blu-ray were released in North America on March 1, 2011. A Blu-ray/DVD combo has been released as well. The DVD and Blu-ray sales exceed one million units and have grossed $20,563,918 in the United States alone; and, as of May 19, 2011, it is the 19th highest selling movie of the year. In all, the DVD has sold over 1.4 million units in the United States. Overall, it has grossed over $30,053,366 on video sales (DVD and Blu-ray sales) in United States alone.

== Reception ==
=== Box office ===
Burlesque was released on Wednesday, November 24, 2010, the day before Thanksgiving in the United States; on its opening day, it came in third to Harry Potter and the Deathly Hallows – Part 1 and Tangled. On Thursday, November 25, 2010, it dropped down to fourth place in the box office behind Harry Potter and the Deathly Hallows: Part 1, Tangled and Unstoppable and went down to fifth on Friday, November 26, 2010. On Sunday, November 28, 2010, it went back up to third place behind Tangled and Harry Potter and the Deathly Hallows: Part 1. It stayed in the top five until December 10, 2010, when it fell to sixth behind The Chronicles of Narnia: The Voyage of the Dawn Treader, The Tourist, Tangled, Harry Potter and the Deathly Hallows: Part 1 and Unstoppable. By the Christmas weekend, it was number 15 at the box office.

The week after Thanksgiving, Burlesque experienced a substantial decrease on ticket sales, earning $9.65 million ($6.1 million for the weekend), for a total of $26.98 million for its first twelve days. As of February 6, 2011, it had grossed $39.4 million in North America, and, as of May 15, 2011, $51.1 million in foreign countries, for a total of $91 million worldwide, and an additional $42 million in domestic video sales (DVD and Blu-ray).

=== Critical response ===
Burlesque received mixed reviews from critics. On Rotten Tomatoes, the film has a rating of 37% based on 178 reviews, with an average rating of 4.90/10. The website's critical consensus reads, "Campy and clichéd, Burlesque wastes its talented cast (including a better-than-expected Christina Aguilera) on a movie that wavers uncertainly between 'bad' and 'so bad it's good.'" On Metacritic, the film holds a score of 47 out of 100, based on 38 reviews, indicating "mixed or average" reviews. Audiences polled by CinemaScore gave the film an average grade of "A-" on an A+ to F scale.

Michael Phillips of the Chicago Tribune said, "The choicest dialogue in Burlesque provokes the sort of laughter that other, intentionally funny films only dream of generating." Mick LaSalle from San Francisco Chronicle gave the movie a full score and praised Aguilera's acting, calling her "jaw-droppingly good in several numbers" and said, "Aguilera knows how to listen to her fellow actors, to react and be spontaneous, and it makes all the difference". Kirk Honeycutt of The Hollywood Reporter called Burlesque "a refreshing throwback to movie musicals that celebrates its stars while indulging in sexy fun" and also praised Aguilera's acting and singing. Stanley Tucci's performance received praise from Entertainment Weekly and Empire thought the dance numbers were thrilling. Time Out labelled the drama "perfunctory" while Roger Ebert said that "Burlesque shows Cher and Christina Aguilera being all that they can be, and that's more than enough." Variety observed that the film "wants to be Cabaret, but lacks the edge and historical context to pull it off." The New York Times said that the story line "had already gathered dust by the time [of] the 1933 musical 42nd Street".

Aguilera's portrayal of the main character received positive reviews, and has been ranked among the hundred best acting performances by musicians by the Billboard magazine. Sarah Carty of RTÉ.ie opined that the singer "manages to bring an unforced charm to her first starring role." Urban Cinefile's Louise Keller praised the film for the "knock out performances by the sizzling hot Christina Aguilera and the legendary Cher."

== Awards ==
Awards
Year	Award	Category	Recipients and nominees	Result
2010	NewNowNext Awards	Best Future Feature		Won
2010	Houston Film Critics Society Awards 2010	Best Original Song	"You Haven't Seen the Last of Me"; Written by Diane Warren, performed by Cher	Nominated
2010	Satellite Awards	Best Original Song	"You Haven't Seen the Last of Me"; Written by Diane Warren, performed by Cher	Won
2010	Phoenix Film Critics Society Awards	Best Original Song	"You Haven't Seen the Last of Me"; Written by Diane Warren, performed by Cher	Won
2010	St. Louis Gateway Film Critics Association Awards 2010	Best Music		Nominated
2011	Critics' Choice Awards	Best Song	"You Haven't Seen the Last of Me"; Written by Diane Warren, performed by Cher	Nominated
2011	Golden Globe Awards	Best Motion Picture – Musical or Comedy		Nominated
2011	Golden Globe Awards	Best Original Song	"You Haven't Seen the Last of Me"; Written by Diane Warren, performed by Cher	Won
2011	Golden Globe Awards	Best Original Song	"Bound to You"; Written by Christina Aguilera, Samuel Dixon, Sia Furler, performed by Christina Aguilera	Nominated
2011	Golden Raspberry Awards	Worst Supporting Actress	Cher	Nominated
2011	GALECA Dorian Awards	Campy (Intentional or Not) Film Of The Year		Won
2011	Golden Reel Awards	Best Sound Editing: Music in a Musical Feature	Todd Bozung	Nominated
2011	Costume Designers Guild Awards	Excellence In Contemporary Film	Burlesque; Michael Kaplan	Nominated
2011	GLAAD Media Awards	Outstanding Film – Wide Release		Nominated
2011	ALMA Awards	Favorite Film Leading Actress – Comedy or Musical	Christina Aguilera	Nominated
2011	MTV Movie Awards	Best Female Breakout Star	Christina Aguilera	Nominated
2011	World Soundtrack Awards	Best Original Song Written Directly for a Film	"You Haven't Seen the Last of Me"; Written by Diane Warren, performed by Cher	Nominated
2011	Palm Springs International Film Festival	Frederick Loewe Award for Film Composing		Won
2012	Japan Gold Disc Awards 2012	Soundtrack Album of the Year	Burlesque: Original Motion Picture Soundtrack	Won
2012	Grammy Awards	Best Song Written for Visual Media	"You Haven't Seen the Last of Me"; Written by Diane Warren, performed by Cher	Nominated
2012	Grammy Awards	Best Compilation Soundtrack for Visual Media	Burlesque: Original Motion Picture Soundtrack	Nominated
2026	LesGaiCineMad Awards	Special Recognition		Won

== Legacy ==
According to Joey Nolfi of Entertainment Weekly, since its release the movie "inspired everything, from drag queen revues to viral internet moments". Nolfi applauded Burlesque as "a campy, niche classic". In 2019, a full-length Burlesque tour, based on the movie, embarked, including at British venues. It starred Farrah Moan as Ali Rose and Chad Michaels as Tess Scali. The Burlesque stage musical was supposed to open at the Paper Mill Playhouse, New Jersey, in autumn 2020, followed by a Broadway theatre adaptation, but the plans were cancelled due to the COVID-19 pandemic. The movie was also referenced in the third season of the VH1 reality show RuPaul's Drag Race All Stars. In a 2020 interview Antin revealed a "hybrid television event/series", based on the movie, was under development.

In January 2021, Madison Hubbell and Zachary Donohue won the gold medal at the U.S. Figure Skating Championships. During the 2020–21 season they danced to a medley of Aguilera's Burlesque songs, which included "Express".

== Stage musical adaptation ==
A stage musical adaptation of the film opened in West End, after completing tryouts at the Manchester Opera House in Manchester, and at the Theatre Royal in Glasgow from June to November 2024.

Steven Antin returned to write the book, with music and lyrics by Christina Aguilera, Sia, Diane Warren, Todrick Hall, and Jess Folley. Antin and Aguilera also produced the adaptation.
