= Got What It Takes? =

British television series

- Genre: Talent show
- Based on: Mom Made Me a Star (Romania)
- Presented by: Lauren Platt; Anna Maynard; Melvin Odoom
- Country of origin: United Kingdom
- Original language: English
- No. of series: 6
- No. of episodes: 60

Production
- Executive producers: Hayden King; Sheldon Lazarus
- Production locations: dock10 studios; St Margaret's; Metropolis Studios
- Editor: Darren King
- Running time: 30–45 minutes
- Production companies: Media Factory; Fulwell 73

Original release
- Network: CBBC
- Release: 6 January 2016 – 13 July 2021

Got What It Takes? is a British talent show that aired on CBBC from 2016 to 2021. Originally presented by Lauren Platt for the first three series, Anna Maynard took over from 2018 until the show's end. In 2021, Melvin Odoom joined Maynard as a co-host. The series saw contestants compete against each other in challenges such as writing songs, performing for celebrity guests and learning choreography. The winner of each series was given the chance to perform at BBC Radio 1's Big Weekend. Throughout its history, the six winners were Amaria Braithwaite, Jorja Douglas, Rio Donkin, Lauren Mia Jones, Georgie Mills and Tilly Lockey.

== History and format ==
The format of the series involved a group of young singers taking part in the singing talent competition. In each episode, three contestants are chosen to compete in a sing-off, whilst the contestants' mothers, aunts or sisters vote for who they want to win. Each week, the contestants learn about an aspect in the music industry, while their female relatives compete for their child's place in the sing-off. The performer with the most sing-off wins automatically reaches the final, and three more are voted for by the public, where they compete for the chance to win and perform at BBC Radio 1's Big Weekend.

From the show's premiere, it was hosted by The X Factor UK contestant Lauren Platt. Platt hosted Got What It Takes? until the conclusion of the third series, after which Anna Maynard took over. Melvin Odoom joined Maynard as a co-host for the final series in 2021. As well as its hosts, Got What It Takes? featured a "music maestro", who helped the contestants with their performances. David Tench was in the role for the first three series, with Max Cooke taking over from series four until the final series. There was also a "games guru", Kevin Adams, who, until the fifth series, led and aided the relatives in the challenges.

== Series overview ==
| Series | Start date | End date | Winner | Finalists | | | Presenter | Music maestro | Games guru |
|---|---|---|---|---|---|---|---|---|---|
| 1 | 6 January 2016 | 9 March 2016 | Amaria Braithwaite | Lola Young | Paddy Wilde | Rai-Elle Williams | Lauren Platt | David Tench | Kevin Adams |
| 2 | 7 February 2017 | 14 April 2017 | Jorja Douglas | Ellie Allen | Erin Lewis | Evan James | Lauren Platt | David Tench | Kevin Adams |
| 3 | 14 February 2018 | 18 April 2018 | Rio Donkin | Annie Lewis | Henry Gallagher | Nataya Bree | Lauren Platt | David Tench | Kevin Adams |
| 4 | 24 September 2018 | 28 November 2018 | Lauren Mia Jones | Jacob Storey | Numa Shah | Seren Levay | Anna Maynard | Max Cooke | Kevin Adams |
| 5 | 8 January 2020 | 11 March 2020 | Georgie Mills | Abi Dring | Ned Payne | Olivia Sinclair | Anna Maynard | Max Cooke | Kevin Adams |
| 6 | 11 May 2021 | 13 July 2021 | Tilly Lockey | George Norman | Oscar Skye | —N/a | Anna Maynard; Melvin Odoom | Max Cooke | —N/a |

=== Series 1 (2016) ===
Winner
Finalist
Semi-Finalist

| Contestant | Age | Hometown | Sing-off wins | Parent |
|---|---|---|---|---|
| Amaria Braithwaite | 12 | Hackney | 1 | Jasmine Braithwaite |
| Becky Holmes | 13 | Leeds | 0 | Linda Holmes |
| Evan Anderson | 12 | Galashiels | 0 | Fiona Anderson |
| Lily Moram | 13 | Dorking | 1 | Lisa Moram |
| Lola Young | 14 | Kent | 1 | Imogen Young |
| Matt Smallwood | 13 | Olton | 1 | Katie Smallwood |
| Paddy Wilde | 12 | Lancaster | 1 | Diane Wilde |
| Rai-Elle Williams | 14 | Croydon | 3 | Bernice Williams |

=== Series 2 (2017) ===
Winner
Finalist
Semi-Finalist

| Contestant | Age | Hometown | Sing-off wins | Parent |
|---|---|---|---|---|
| Brook Miller | 14 | Newcastle | 1 | Sharon Miller |
| Ellie Allen | 14 | Bournemouth | 1 | Lou Allen |
| Erin Lewis | 14 | Swansea | 0 | Julia Lewis |
| Evan James | 14 | Essex | 3 | Thea James |
| Jorja Douglas | 14 | Hertfordshire | 1 | Stephi Douglas |
| Kellimarie Willis | 13 | Coventry | 1 | Debbie Willis |
| Kyra West | 13 | London | 1 | Margaret West |
| Luka Chesterton | 12 | Birmingham | 1 | Valerie Chesterton |

=== Series 3 (2018) ===
Winner
Finalist
Semi-Finalist

| Contestant | Age | Hometown | Sing-off wins | Parent |
|---|---|---|---|---|
| Annie Lewis | 13 | Cowbridge | 2 | Liz Lewis |
| Emilly Santos | 14 | South London | 1 | Irene Santos |
| Henry Gallagher | 14 | Wigan | 0 | Marie Gallagher |
| Jada Fyvie | 13 | Elgin | 1 | Natasha Fyvie |
| Jeremiah Emmanuel | 12 | Limehouse | 1 | Aminata Roberts (aunt) |
| Nataya Bree | 14 | Swansea | 1 | Kelsey Ashmole |
| Rio Donkin | 14 | Hull | 1 | Sherina Donkin (sister) |
| Shaun Curtis | 14 | Luton | 1 | Shelly Curtis |

=== Series 4 (2018) ===
Winner
Finalist
Semi-Finalist

| Contestant | Age | Hometown | Sing-off wins | Parent |
|---|---|---|---|---|
| Cooper Stout | 14 | Kent | 1 | Michelle Piror (aunt) |
| Elijah Freeman | 13 | Stockport | 0 | Ntiriwah Freeman |
| Eva Finnemore | 12 | Rutland | 1 | Mel Finnemore |
| Jacob Storey | 14 | Leicester | 1 | Annabel Storey |
| Lauren Mia Jones | 14 | Swansea | 2 | Tracey Jones |
| Numa Shah | 14 | Oxford | 1 | Naveeda Shah |
| Poppy Eagles | 12 | Yorkshire | 1 | Carolyn Eagles |
| Seren Levay | 13 | Gloucester | 1 | Rachel Levay |

=== Series 5 (2020) ===
Winner
Finalist
Semi-Finalist

| Contestant | Age | Hometown | Sing-off wins | Parent |
|---|---|---|---|---|
| Abi Dring | 14 | Nottingham | 0 | Emma Morling (sister) |
| Amberina Large | 13 | Caerphilly | 1 | Linya Large |
| Georgie Mills | 13 | Chesterfield | 1 | Claire Roberts (aunt) |
| Malakhi Best | 13 | London | 2 (Note: Since Best and Payne won two sing-offs each, Payne appeared in 6 sing-offs giving him the fast pass to the final.) | Andrea Henry |
| Ned Payne | 13 | Derby | 2 | Emma Payne |
| Olivia Sinclair | 12 | Cardiff | 0 | Kylie Sinclair |
| Sarita Playfair | 13 | Tyne and Wear | 1 | Edith Playfair |
| Thomas Dunleavy | 14 | Cambridgeshire | 1 | Sara Dunleavy |

=== Series 6 (2021) ===
On 26 June 2020, applications for the sixth series of Got What It Takes? were opened on the CBBC website, with the first episode being aired on 11 May 2021. This series followed social distancing guidelines due to the COVID-19 pandemic.

Winner
Finalist
Semi-Finalist

| Contestant | Age | Hometown | Sing-off wins | Parent |
|---|---|---|---|---|
| Ellisse Alexander | 14 | East London | 1 | Sam Alexander |
| George Norman | 15 | Kent | 2 | Vikki Norman |
| Oscar Skye | 13 | Surrey | 1 | Amanda Stevens |
| Ruby Sears | 14 | West London | 1 | Becs Sears |
| Tilly Lockey | 15 | County Durham | 0 | Sarah Lockey |
