= St Martin's School, Brentwood =

St Martin's School

Location
- Hanging Hill Lane; Hutton, Essex, CM13 2HG; England; 51.623°N 0.345°E

Information
- Type: Academy
- Motto: Be The Best You Can Be
- Established: 1 July 2011
- Department for Education URN: 136875 Tables
- Ofsted: Reports
- Head teacher: Jamie Foster
- Gender: Coeducational
- Age: 11 to 18
- Houses: Seacole, Aristotle, Ivor, Nobel, Turner
- Website: www.st-martins.essex.sch.uk

St Martin's School is a coeducational secondary school and sixth form with academy status, located in the Hutton area of Brentwood, Essex, England.

== Background ==
The school used to separate boys and girls school, but these were combined in the 1970s to make one co-educational school on the same site. The school converted to academy status on 1 July 2011.

== Notable former pupils ==
- Nicola Juniper, professional cyclist
- Stephen Moyer, actor
- Jess Folley, singer, songwriter, actor

== See also ==
- List of secondary schools in Essex
