= Jungle (British TV series) =

- Genre: Drama
- Created by: Junior Okoli; Chas Appeti
- Written by: Junior Okoli
- Directed by: Junior Okoli
- Starring: Ezra Elliott; RA; Nadia A'Rubea; AMARIA BB
- Music by: Richard Watson
- Country of origin: United Kingdom
- Original language: English
- No. of seasons: 1
- No. of episodes: 6

Production
- Executive producers: Chas Appeti; Junior Okoli
- Producer: Kurban Kassam Junior Okoli Chas Appeti
- Cinematography: Chas Appeti
- Editors: Josh Mallalieu; Vid Price
- Running time: 39-58 minutes
- Production company: Nothing Lost

Original release
- Network: Amazon Prime Video
- Release: 30 September 2022

Jungle is a British hip hop drama television series created by Junior Okoli and Chas Appeti. It premiered on Amazon Prime Video on 30 September 2022.

== Synopsis ==
The series follows the interconnected lives and struggles of strangers in a near-future, dystopian version of inner-city London, including a father trying to escape gang culture and a young mother going to great lengths to protect her children. It is a music-centric drama, told through a mixture of dialogue and rap, grime, and drill music.

== Cast ==
- Ezra Elliott as Gogo
- RA as Slim
- Nadia A'Rubea as Jessica
- AMARIA BB as Bianca
- M24 as 6ix
- IAMDDB as Mia
- Poundz as Marcus

== Episodes ==
No.	Title	Directed by	Written by	Original release date
1	"Welcome to the Jungle"	Junior Okoli	Junior Okoli, Chas Appeti	30 September 2022
2	"No Matter the Cost"	Junior Okoli	Junior Okoli	30 September 2022
3	"Go. Going. Gone."	Junior Okoli	Junior Okoli	30 September 2022
4	"God Bless the Hood"	Junior Okoli	Junior Okoli	30 September 2022
5	"Flowers Blossom"	Junior Okoli	Junior Okoli	30 September 2022
6	"We All Fall Down"	Junior Okoli	Junior Okoli	30 September 2022

== Production ==
On 28 August 2020, Amazon Studios announced Jungle, a grime and drill hip hop drama series. The series was created and is executive produced by Junior Okoli and Chas Appeti, under their production company Nothing Lost. Appeti previously directed music videos for UK hip hop artists, such as Tinchy Stryder, Chip, and Giggs, and Okoli was a music manager. The two made a self-funded pilot episode, and began shopping it around to production companies, with Amazon Studios coming onboard.

The cast is made up mostly of UK rap and drill artists, including Tinie Tempah, Big Narstie, Unknown T, Jordan McCann, Jaykae, IAMDDB, Double Lz, Poundz, and M24. The series was filmed in London over eight weeks, beginning in April 2021.

== Release ==
A teaser for the series was released on 12 August 2022. All six episodes premiered on Prime Video on 30 September 2022.
