= Lauren Platt =

English media personality (born 1997)

- Born: Lauren Nicole Platt; 7 October 1997 (age 28); Billericay, Essex, England
- Genres: Pop
- Occupations: Singer; presenter; actress
- Instrument: Vocals
- Years active: 2014–2019

Lauren Nicole Platt (born 7 October 1997) is an English former television presenter, singer and actress. After finishing in fourth place in the eleventh series of The X Factor, she presented the CBBC talent series Got What It Takes? from 2016 to 2018. Following the series, Platt appeared in various stage productions including Jack and the Beanstalk, Beauty and the Beast and Sleeping Beauty.

== Early life ==
Lauren Nicole Platt was born on 7 October 1997 in Billericay, Essex, but spent ten years living in Spain. In 2010, she auditioned for the role of Louise Mitchell on EastEnders, but lost out to Brittany Papple. In 2011, she was the runner-up of local talent contest the Essex Factor and in 2012, competed in Open Mic UK. Platt attended the Billericay School, a comprehensive school in her hometown, where she sat her GCSEs.

== Career ==
Platt auditioned for The X Factor in 2014 and became the youngest solo contestant to reach the live finals. With the eliminations of Stephanie Nala and Chloe Jasmine in week two and Lola Saunders in week four, Platt became Cheryl's last remaining act in the competition. In the quarter-final, Platt was in the bottom two with Stereo Kicks, but advanced to the semi-final after Cowell sent the result to the deadlock and Stereo Kicks were eliminated as the act with the fewest public votes. However, in the semi-final, Platt was in the bottom two with Andrea Faustini and was eliminated with only her mentor voting to send Platt through to the final, finishing in fourth place. After the series finished, voting statistics revealed that Platt had received more votes than Faustini. This meant that if there was not a Final Showdown, or if Walsh or Cowell voted to send Platt through to the final and the result to deadlock, Platt would've advanced to the final and Faustini would've been eliminated.

The X Factor performances and results (2014)
Stage	Song	Theme	Result
Room audition	"I Know Where I've Been"	Free choice	Through to arena
Arena audition	"How Will I Know"	Free choice	Through to bootcamp
Six-chair challenge (bootcamp)	"Man in the Mirror"	Free choice	Through to judges' houses
Judges'houses	"Beneath Your Beautiful"	Free choice	Through to live shows
Live week 1	"Happy"	Number ones	Safe (2nd) – 10.4%
Live week 2	"Flashdance... What a Feeling"	80's night	Safe (2nd) – 12.7%
Live week 3	"Let It Go"	Saturday night at the movies	Safe (2nd) – 11.8%
Live week 4	"Dark Horse"	Fright night (Halloween)	Safe (4th) 11.0%
Live week 5	"I'll Be There"	Michael Jackson vs. Queen	Safe (3rd) – 13.1%
Live week 6	"Smile"	Big band	Safe (3rd) – 13.2%
Live week 7	"How Will I Know"	Whitney Houston vs. Elton John	Safe (3rd) 16.0%
Quarter-Final	"Clarity"	Song chosen by Little Mix	Bottom two (4th) – 17.8%
Quarter-Final	"Don't You Worry Child"	Song chosen by the public	Bottom two (4th) – 17.8%
Quarter-Final	"I Know Where I've Been"	Free choice	Safe (deadlock)
Semi-Final	"Stay Another Day"	Christmas songs	Bottom two (3rd) – 20.1%
Semi-Final	"Story of My Life"	Songs to get you to the final	Bottom two (3rd) – 20.1%
Semi-Final	"There You'll Be"	Free choice	Eliminated (fourth place)

Following the conclusion of The X Factor, she toured across the UK and Ireland with a number of the contestants as part of The X Factor Live Tour. Whilst appearing on Good Morning Britain, she revealed that she was ill for a lot of her tenure on the series, as well as its accompanying tour. The illness affected her voice and inspired her to pursue other ventures, including a YouTube channel revolving around beauty, lifestyle and fashion. The YouTube channel was noticed by casting agents at CBBC, who contracted her as the presenter of their new talent series Got What It Takes? in 2016. She presented the series until 2018, when Anna Maynard took over the role. Later in 2018, Platt portrayed the role of Jack in a stage production of Jack and the Beanstalk. In 2019, she portrayed Belle in a production of Beauty and the Beast. Later that year, Platt appeared as Aurora in a production of Sleeping Beauty.
