= The Voice Kids (British TV series) series 1 =

First series of The Voice Kids

The Voice Kids
- Series 1
- Hosted by: Emma Willis (ITV); Cel Spellman (ITV Hub)
- Coaches: will.i.am; Pixie Lott; Danny Jones
- Winner: Jess Folley
- Winning coach: Pixie Lott
- No. of episodes: 8

Release
- Original network: ITV; ITV Hub (The V Room)
- Original release: 10 June – 16 July 2017

Series chronology
- Next → Series 2

The Voice Kids is a British television music competition to find new singing talent. The first series began airing on 10 June 2017, being broadcast on a weekly basis on ITV. It is hosted by Emma Willis and the coaches are will.i.am, Pixie Lott and Danny Jones. In the premiere series, Jess Folley won the competition and Pixie Lott was the winning coach.

== Coaches ==
In early 2016, along with the announcement that The Voice UK would move to ITV for three years, it was announced that The Voice Kids had been ordered for two series. The winner would receive £30,000 and a family trip to Disneyland Paris. Unlike the adult version, there will be no knockouts rounds. When it was previously reported that the adult version's sixth series would feature five live shows (which turned out to be the usual three), reports claimed that there would be three live shows; there will only be one.

Series 1 coaches

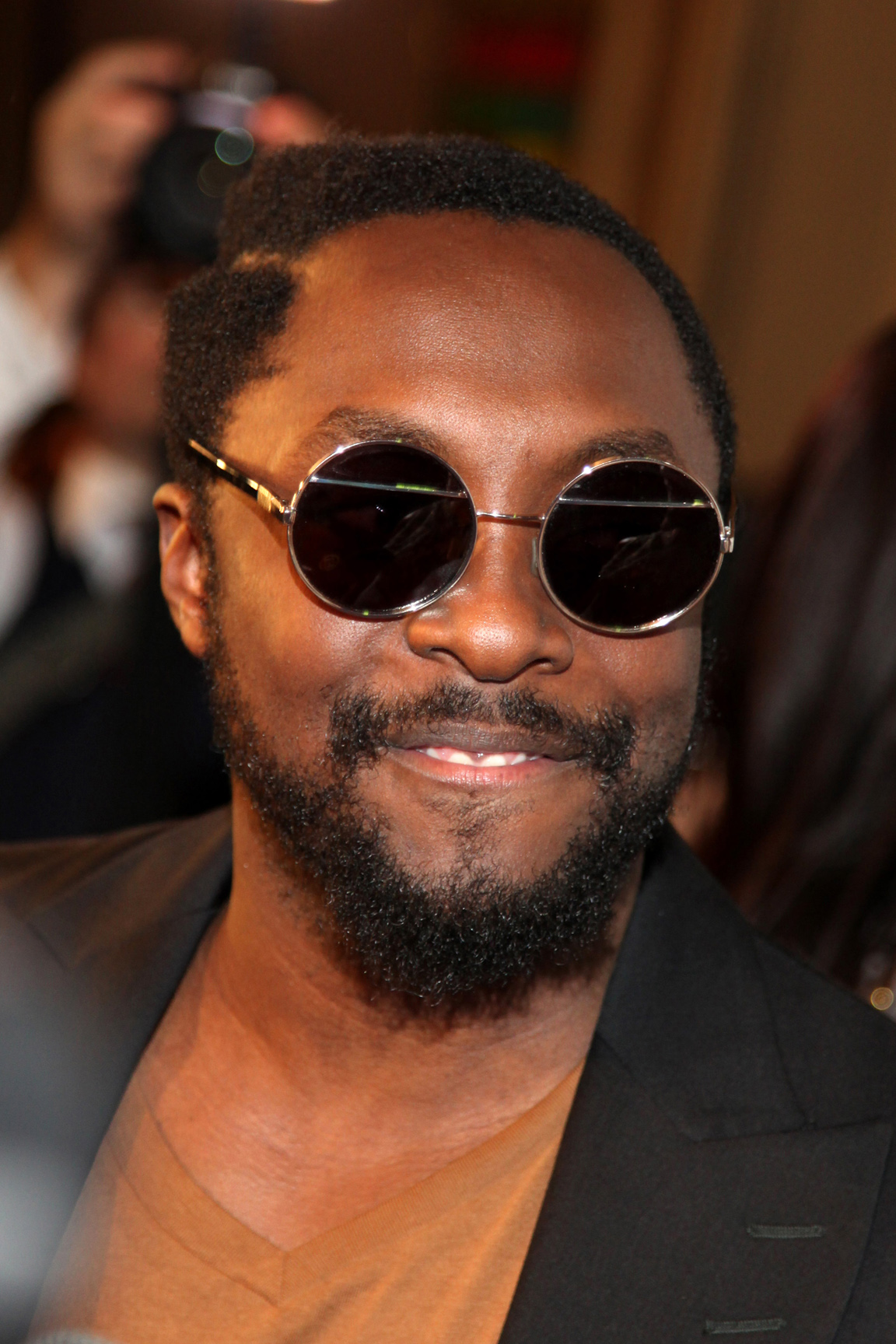
will.i.am

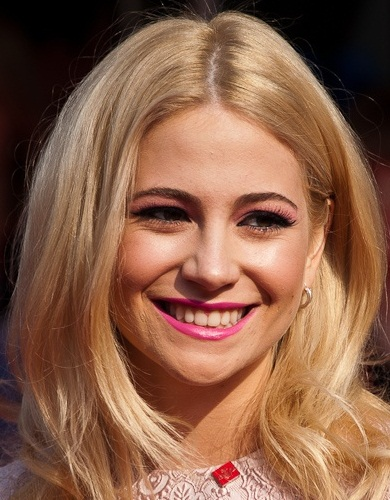
Pixie Lott

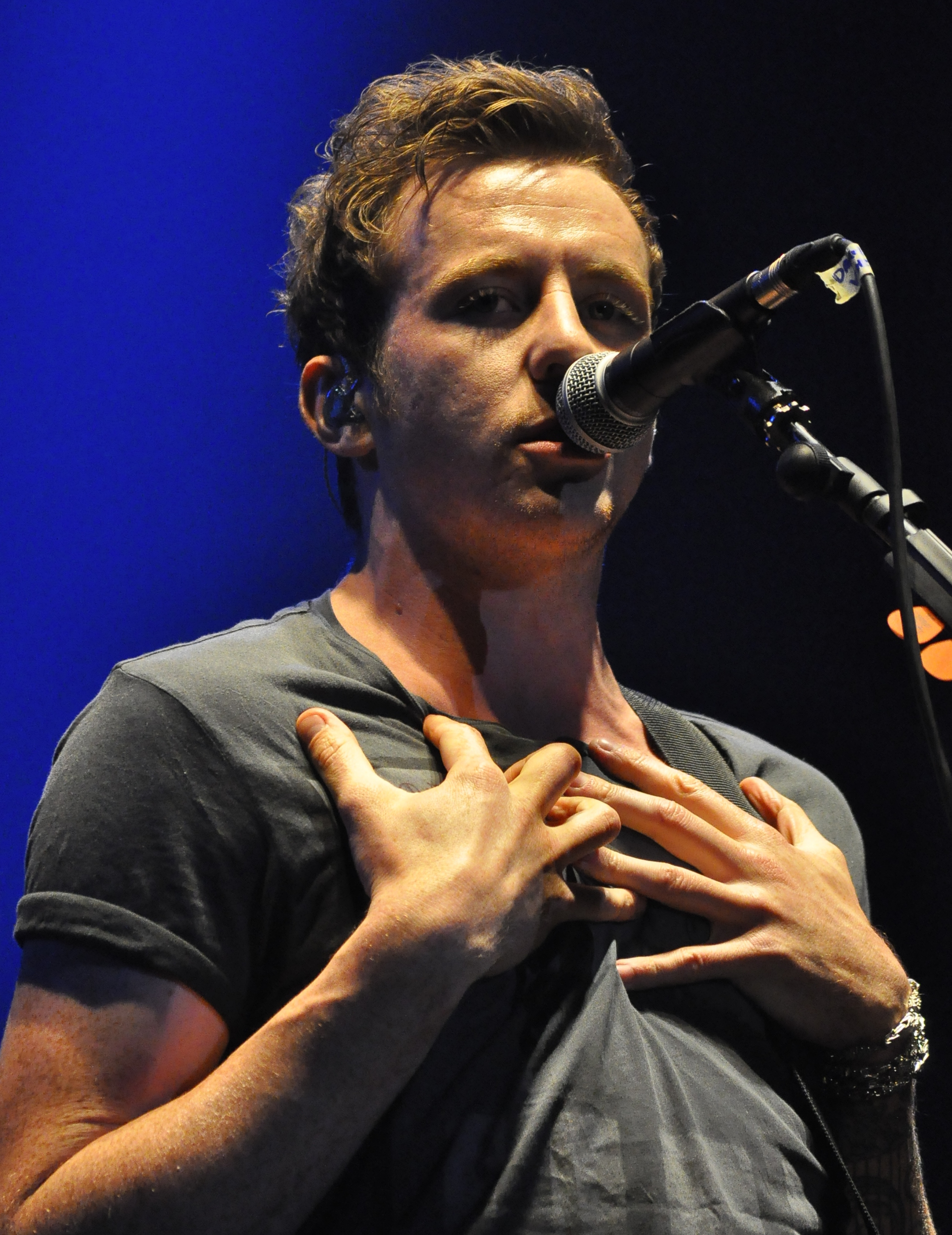
Danny Jones

In July 2016, it was announced that adult show coach will.i.am would also be a coach on The Voice Kids. On 15 November 2016, it was announced Pixie Lott and Danny Jones from McFly would be coaches along with will.i.am. Of this announcement, Pixie Lott commented, "I can’t wait to join The Voice Kids and help discover the next big star. I have such a passion for talented young people and I know the UK will have lots – I can’t wait to hear them! I’m looking forward to getting started and working alongside my fellow coaches will.i.am and Danny Jones." Jones stated, "I'm pumped about joining The Voice Kids team. There are so many talented kids out there, they just need to be heard and this is a great platform for them. I’m looking forward to finding some fresh talent and coaching them. You never know, there might be a mini McFly out there!" and will.i.am said, "Doing The Voice Kids with Pixie and Danny is going to be dope and I'm really excited to discover just how talented British kids can be." On the same day it was confirmed that Emma Willis will host the show and that Cel Spellman will host the spin-off show The V Room. On 20 May 2017, the trailer for the first series was released.

== Teams ==
Colour key:

- Winner
- Finalist
- Eliminated in the Semi-final
- Eliminated in the Battles

Coach	Top 36 Artists			
will.i.am				
will.i.am	Jake McKechnie	Gina Philpot	Brooke Layla	Perry Cooke
will.i.am	Zara Francis	Francesca Luker	Marby Arriola	Lil' T
will.i.am	Dominyka Marcinkeviciute	Adam Moloney	Victoria Wiltshire	Cole Lawton-Challenger
Pixie Lott				
Pixie Lott	Jess Folley	Riccardo Atherton	Lewis Blissett	Sophia Burridge
Pixie Lott	Miriam Nyarko	Tabi Gervis	Devon Browne	Amaria Braithwaite
Pixie Lott	Zena Donnelly	Erin Connell	Leah D'Cruz	Chi Ennis McLean
Danny Jones				
Danny Jones	Erin LeCount	Courtney Hadwin	Jessica Richardson	Jack Goodacre
Danny Jones	Juno Cox	Hollie Firmin	Nathan Johnston	Jude Landeg
Danny Jones	Hayley Canham	Eboni Green	Millianna Cotterell	Tilly McLaren

== Blind auditions ==
The open-auditions application for the first series closed on 2 September 2016, with the age limit being 7–14 years old. The show began staging producers' audition days in August 2016 across the United Kingdom., with the blind auditions beginning filming in December 2016.

Each coach has the length of the artists' performance to decide if they want that artist on their team. Should two or more coaches want the same artist, then the artist will choose their coach.

Colour key

✔	Coach hit his/her "I WANT YOU" button
	Artist defaulted to this coach's team
	Artist elected to join this coach's team
	Artist eliminated with no coach pressing his or her "I WANT YOU" button
	Artist received a 3 Chair Turn

=== Episode 1 (10 June) ===
The series premiered on 10 June aired from 7.45pm until 9.15pm BST.

Order	Artist	Age	Song	Coaches and artists choices		
Order	Artist	Age	Song	will.i.am	Pixie	Danny
1	Jessica Richardson	13	"Somebody to Love"	✔	✔	✔
2	Leah D'Cruz	8	"Part of Your World″	✔	✔	—
3	Adam Moloney	14	"When You Love Someone"	✔	✔	✔
4	Ryan Granger	13	"Hey There Delilah"	—	—	—
5	Courtney Hadwin	12	"Nutbush City Limits"	—	—	✔
6	Chi Ennis McLean	12	"Oh Happy Day"	—	✔	—
7	Jude Landeg	13	"Treasure"	—	—	✔
8	Charlotte Zone	11	"The Greatest"	—	—	—
9	Lil' T	10	"Shutdown"	✔	✔	✔
10	Riccardo Atherton	13	"Hallelujah"	✔	✔	✔

=== Episode 2 (17 June) ===
The second episode aired from 7.30pm until 9.00pm.

Order	Artist	Age	Song	Coaches and artists choices		
Order	Artist	Age	Song	will.i.am	Pixie	Danny
1	Jake McKechnie	12	"All of Me"	✔	—	—
2	Jess Folley	14	"Ain't Got Far to Go"	—	✔	✔
3	Amaria Braithwaite	14	"A Change Is Gonna Come"	✔	✔	—
4	Sebastian Carrington	10	"Pie Jesu"	—	—	—
5	Erin LeCount	13	"All About You"	—	—	✔
6	Perry Cooke	14	"Stay with Me"	✔	—	—
7	Tilly McLaren	10	"Brand New You"	—	—	✔
8	Zena Donnelly	14	"Mamma Knows Best"	—	✔	—
9	Brooke Layla	12	"Running Up That Hill"	✔	—	✔
10	Georgia	9	"Lady of Knock"	—	—	—
11	Jack Goodacre	11	"Free Fallin'"	✔	✔	✔

=== Episode 3 (24 June) ===
The third episode aired from 7.30pm until 9.00pm.

Order	Artist	Age	Song	Coaches and artists choices		
Order	Artist	Age	Song	will.i.am	Pixie	Danny
1	Sophia Burridge	12	"Purple Rain"	—	✔	✔
2	Nathan Johnston	13	"Old Time Rock and Roll"	—	✔	✔
3	Juno Cox	14	"Chasing Pavements"	—	✔	✔
4	Eithne Cox	12	"I See the Light"	—	—	—
5	Francesca Luker	13	"If I Ain't Got You"	✔	✔	✔
6	Devon Browne	12	"Story of My Life"	✔	✔	—
7	Zara Francis	11	"Virtual Insanity”	✔	—	✔
8	Dominyka Marcinkeviciute	13	"Diamonds"	✔	—	✔
9	Erin Connell	12	"On My Own"	—	✔	—
10	Daisy Holmes	8	"When I'm Gone"	—	—	—
11	Hayley Canham	14	"Love Yourself"	—	—	✔
12	Lewis Blissett	12	"Cry Me Out"	✔	✔	✔

=== Episode 4 (1 July) ===
The fourth episode aired from 7.30pm until 9.00pm.

Order	Artist	Age	Song	Coaches and artists choices		
Order	Artist	Age	Song	will.i.am	Pixie	Danny
1	Hollie Firmin	13	"Nothing's Real but Love"	—	—	✔
2	Marby Arriola	14	"Slip"	✔	✔	✔
3	Miriam Nyarko	14	"Hold Back the River"	—	✔	✔
4	Kenya-Mae Allen-Burgess	10	"One Day I'll Fly Away"	—	—	—
5	Victoria Wiltshire	14	"O Mio Babbino Caro"	✔	—	—
6	Cole Lawton-Challenger	13	"My Boo"	✔	—	—
7	Eboni Green	14	"I Dreamed a Dream"	—	—	✔
8	Sofia Cahill	14	"99 Red Balloons"	—	—	—
9	Tabi Gervis	14	"Songbird"	—	✔	✔
10	Gina Philpot	13	"I Put a Spell on You"	✔	Team full	—
11	Tomas	11	"Piece by Piece"	Team full	Team full	—
12	Millianna Cotterell	14	"You've Got the Love"	Team full	Team full	✔

== Battle rounds ==
Both battle rounds were held on Saturday 8/Sunday 9 July from 7.30pm until 9pm.

Colour key

Artist won the Battle and advanced to the Semi-final
Artist lost the Battle and was eliminated

=== Episode 1 (8 July) ===
Order	Coach	Artists			Song
1	Team Pixie	Zena Donnelly	Miriam Nyarko	Jess Folley	"Little Me"
2	Team Danny	Jude Landeg	Tilly McLaren	Jack Goodacre	"Place Your Hands"
3	Team Will	Perry Cooke	Lil' T	Cole Lawton-Challenger	"Beggin'"
4	Team Danny	Eboni Green	Courtney Hadwin	Hollie Firmin	"Dancing in the Street"
5	Team Will	Dominyka Marcinkeviciute	Jake McKechnie	Zara Francis	"Never Forget You"
6	Team Pixie	Tabi Gervis	Riccardo Atherton	Erin Connell	"Over the Rainbow"

=== Episode 2 (9 July) ===
Order	Coach	Artists			Song
1	Team Pixie	Leah D'Cruz	Devon Browne	Lewis Blissett	"Thinking Out Loud"
2	Team Danny	Jessica Richardson	Nathan Johnston	Millianna Cotterell	"Runnin' (Lose It All)"
3	Team Will	Marby Arriola	Victoria Wiltshire	Brooke Layla	"There Must Be an Angel (Playing with My Heart)"
4	Team Danny	Hayley Canham	Juno Cox	Erin LeCount	"Eyes Shut"
5	Team Will	Francesca Luker	Gina Philpot	Adam Moloney	"As"
6	Team Pixie	Chi Ennis McLean	Sophia Burridge	Amaria Braithwaite	"When Love Takes Over"

== Show details ==
=== Results summary ===
Team's colour key
Team Will
Team Pixie
Team Danny

Result's colour key
Artist received the most public votes
Artist was eliminated
Finalist

Results per artist
Contestant	Semi-final	Final
Jess Folley	Safe	Winner
Riccardo Atherton	Safe	Finalist
Erin LeCount	Safe	Finalist
Courtney Hadwin	Safe	Finalist
Gina Philpot	Safe	Finalist
Jake McKechnie	Safe	Finalist
Lewis Blissett	Eliminated	Eliminated (Semi-Finals)
Sophia Burridge	Eliminated	Eliminated (Semi-Finals)
Brooke Layla	Eliminated	Eliminated (Semi-Finals)
Perry Cooke	Eliminated	Eliminated (Semi-Finals)
Jack Goodacre	Eliminated	Eliminated (Semi-Finals)
Jessica Richardson	Eliminated	Eliminated (Semi-Finals)

=== Semi-final (15 July) ===
The semi final aired from 7.30pm until 9.30pm.

Order	Coach	Artist	Song	Result
1	Danny Jones	Courtney Hadwin	"I Got You (I Feel Good)"	Advanced
2	Danny Jones	Erin LeCount	"Adventure of a Lifetime"	Advanced
3	Danny Jones	Jack Goodacre	"Just the Way You Are"	Eliminated
4	Danny Jones	Jessica Richardson	"Unconditionally"	Eliminated
5	will.i.am	Jake McKechnie	"Can't Stop the Feeling!"	Advanced
6	will.i.am	Brooke Layla	"You're My World"	Eliminated
7	will.i.am	Perry Cooke	"Imagine"	Eliminated
8	will.i.am	Gina Philpot	"At Last"	Advanced
9	Pixie Lott	Riccardo Atherton	"Vision of Love"	Advanced
10	Pixie Lott	Sophia Burridge	"Stone Cold"	Eliminated
11	Pixie Lott	Jess Folley	"Tears"	Advanced
12	Pixie Lott	Lewis Blissett	"Who's Lovin' You"	Eliminated

=== Final (16 July) ===
The live final aired from 7.10pm until 9.00pm. This episode determined the winner of the £30,000 cash prize for his/her musical future and a family holiday to Disneyland Paris.

- Group performances: Team Danny with Danny Jones ("Shine a Light"), Team Pixie with Pixie Lott ("Boys and Girls"), Team Will with will.i.am ("I Gotta Feeling")
- Musical guests: Niall Horan ("Slow Hands") and The Vamps ("Middle of the Night")

Order	Coach	Artist	Song	Result
1	Danny Jones	Courtney Hadwin	"And I Am Telling You I'm Not Going"	Finalist
2	Pixie Lott	Riccardo Atherton	"Beauty and the Beast"	Finalist
3	will.i.am	Gina Philpot	"I Say a Little Prayer"	Finalist
4	Danny Jones	Erin LeCount	"Can't Help Falling in Love"	Finalist
5	Pixie Lott	Jess Folley	"Love on Top"	Winner
6	will.i.am	Jake McKechnie	"Humble and Kind"	Finalist
