= The X Factor: The Band =

2019 special edition of The X Factor

- Presented by: Dermot O'Leary
- Judges: Simon Cowell; Nicole Scherzinger; Leona Lewis
- Winner: Real Like You
- Finals venue: Resorts World Arena
- No. of episodes: 4

Release
- Original network: ITV
- Original release: 9 December – 15 December 2019

The X Factor: The Band is a special edition of British reality talent competition The X Factor, which premiered on 9 December 2019 on ITV. The format for the series was announced on 4 November 2019 as a last-minute replacement for a planned All Stars spin-off series, which was originally supposed to air following The X Factor: Celebrity in late 2019. The format is an accelerated version of The X Factor whereby solo artists auditioned in front of Simon Cowell and Nicole Scherzinger to try to win a place in a boyband or girlband. The new bands would then compete for a chance to join Cowell's record label and launch their careers.

Following closed auditions at Cowell's record label, series 3 winner Leona Lewis joined the judges panel for the live audience auditions and live finale. Industry experts were also on hand to help including producers Naughty Boy and Fred Ball as well as singer Ella Eyre and songwriter Carla Williams. The Band ran over the course of four episodes on 9, 11 and 13 December 2019. The live finale was held at Resorts World Arena on 15 December 2019, where the girlband (RLY) Real Like You beat boyband Unwritten Rule to win a recording contract with Syco Music. Real Like You's winner's single is an original song titled "Be Like Them".

== Background ==
The series was first reported in early 2019 as being The X Factor: All Stars, as the regular series was being put on hiatus due to declining ratings. However, in November 2019, it was announced that the proposed All Stars series had been axed in favour of The X Factor: The Band. The new spin-off saw acts audition to form part of a girl group and boy band. The news came just weeks after former X Factor winners Little Mix announced their own plans for a similar series, Little Mix: The Search, on BBC One in 2020.

The auditions took place at Syco Music headquarters in London, in front of the judges and industry experts. The series aired over four episodes, beginning Monday 9, then Wednesday 11 and Friday 13 December before the live finale on Sunday 15 December which was held at the Resorts World Arena in Birmingham. Speaking on the decision to host the finale in Birmingham, host Dermot O'Leary said "It’s always nice to get out and take the show around the country. We did the final in Manchester a few years ago, which went really well. It’s always nice to get out and see other places and you get a full sense of the whole country being involved as well. I’m looking forward to it!"

== Hosts and judges ==
Dermot O'Leary returned to host the programme. Cowell judged the programme alongside Nicole Scherzinger, who has previously served as a judge on the main version of the programme as well as judging the recently aired celebrity version, and third series winner Leona Lewis. Industry experts and artists will also join the judges as experts, including producer Naughty Boy and singer-songwriter Ella Eyre.

Host and Judges gallery

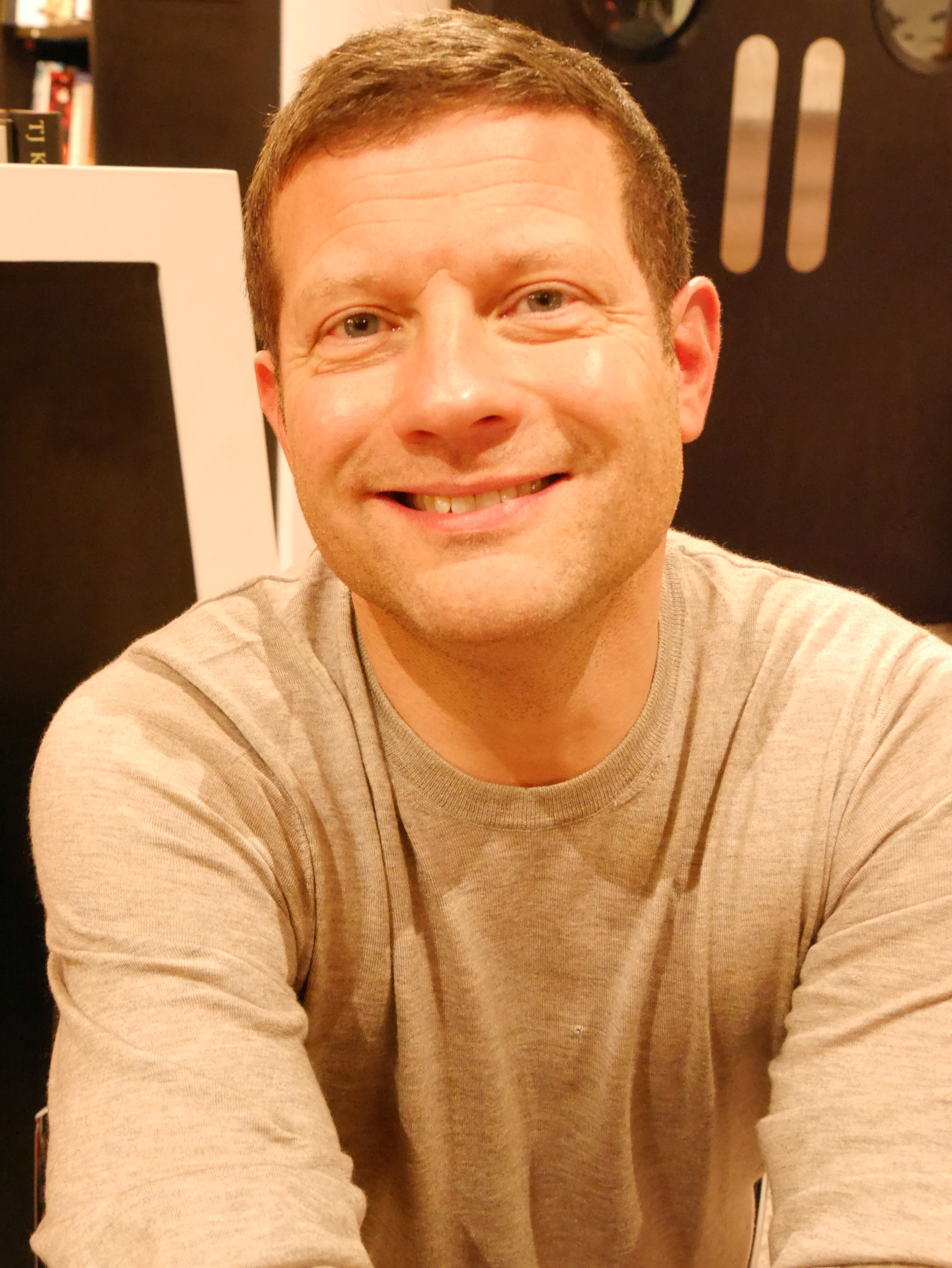
Dermot O'Leary (host)

Simon Cowell (judge)

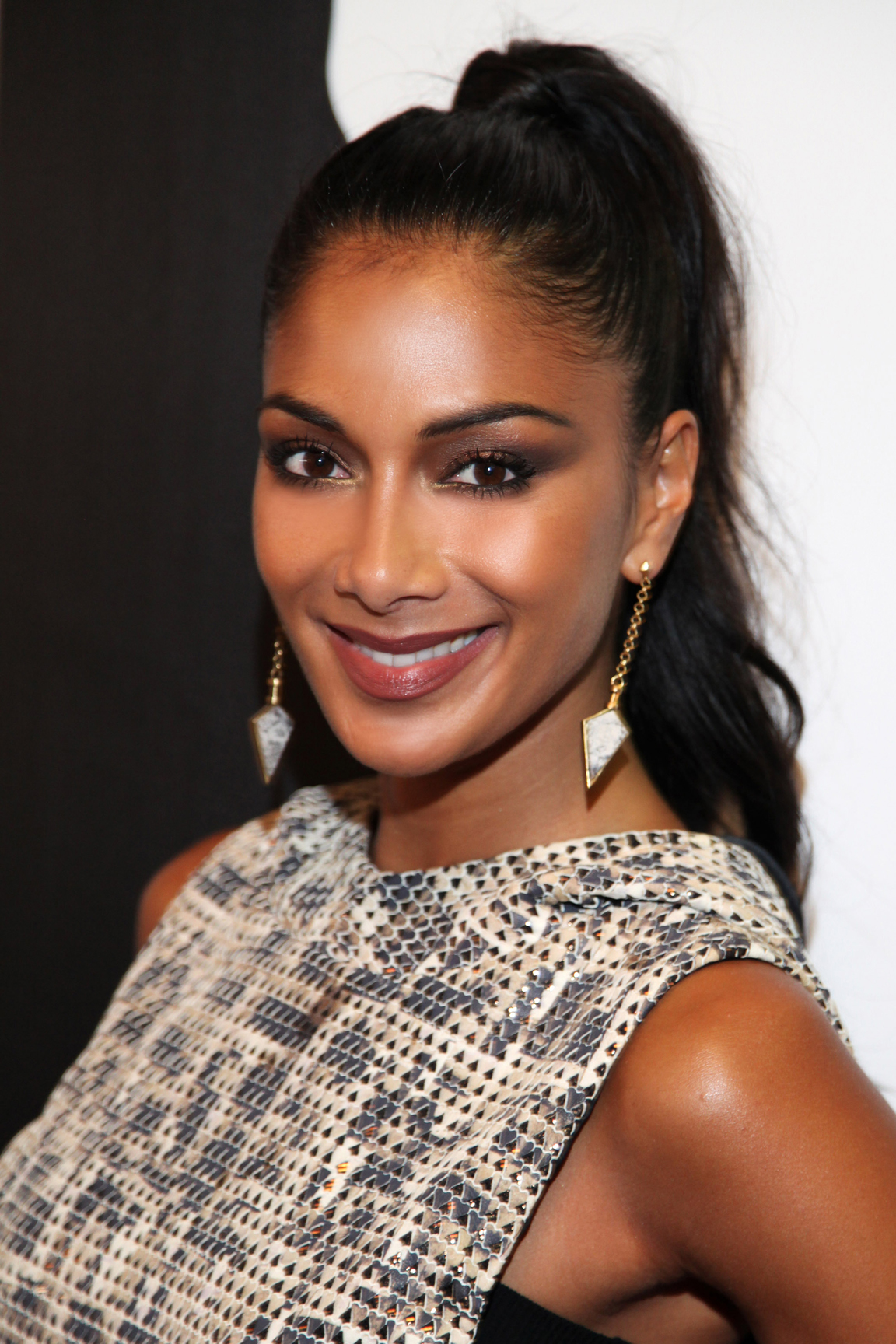
Nicole Scherzinger (judge)

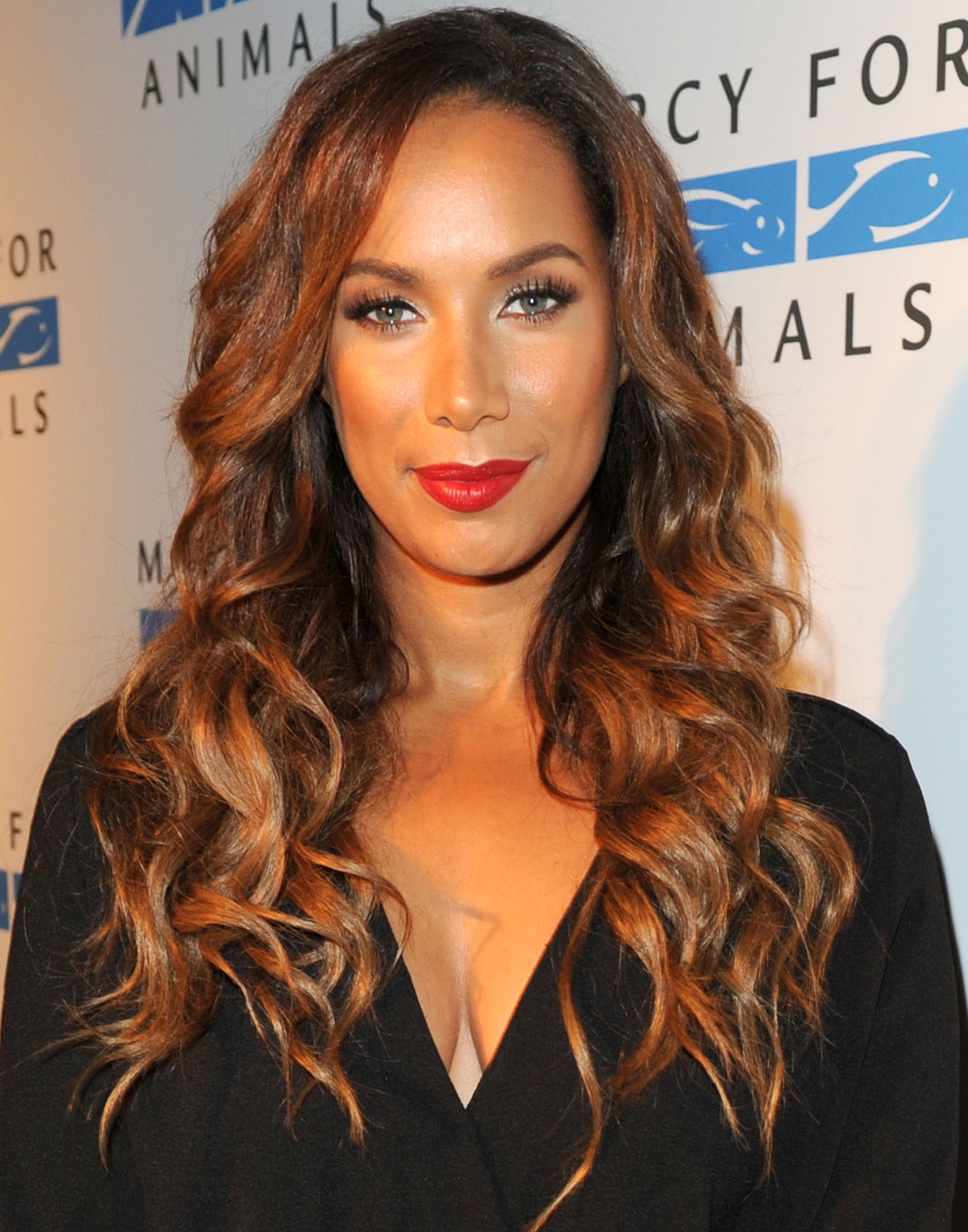
Leona Lewis (judge)

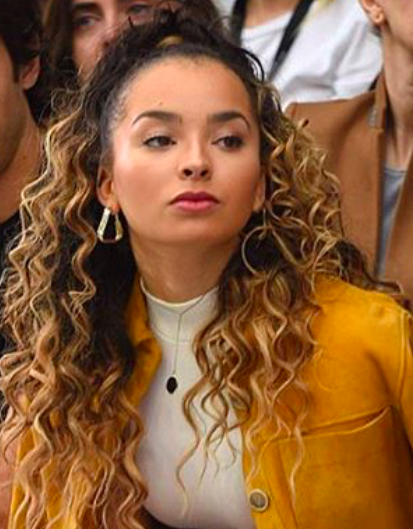
Ella Eyre (industry panel)

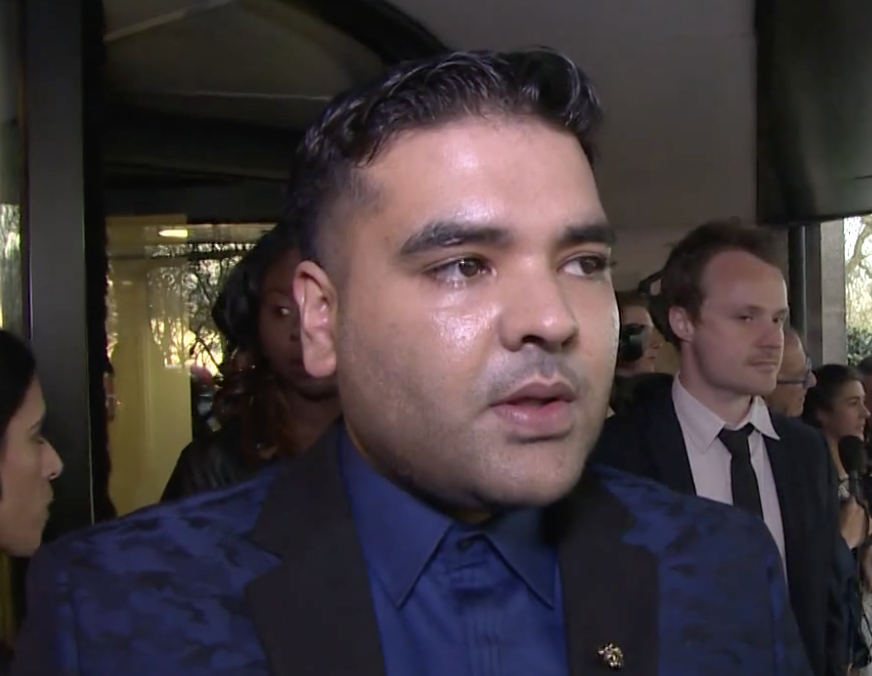
Naughty Boy (industry panel)

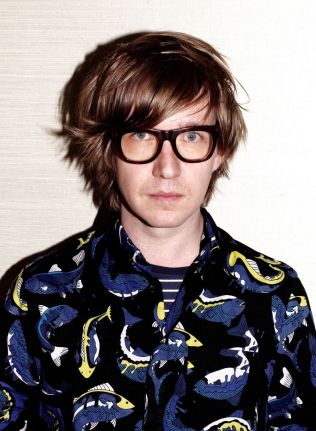
Fred Ball (industry panel)

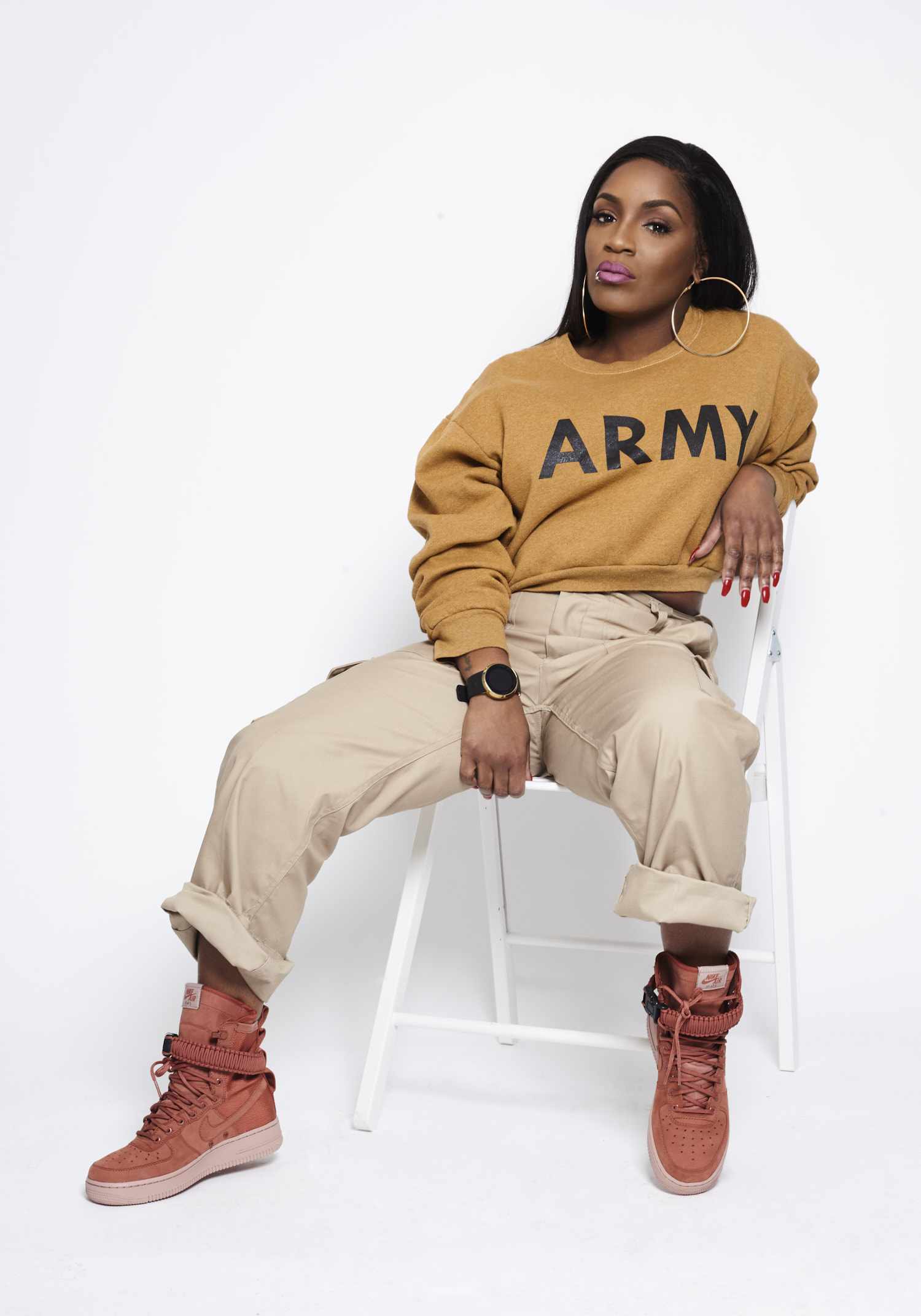
Carla Williams (industry panel)

== Episodes ==
=== Closed Auditions (9 December 2019) ===
The series began with a number of auditions held at Syco Music headquarters in London. Auditionees sang in front of Cowell and Scherzinger a number of industry experts sat in the background. The industry panel included Grammy-nominated singer-songwriter Lil' Eddie who previous worked with Cowell as a vocal coach on The X Factor USA and who has previously worked with Fifth Harmony. Joining Eddie was Norwegian producer-songwriter Fred Ball (whose previous credits include One Direction), British producer-artist Naughty Boy who has worked with many previous contestants of The X Factor and Grammy nominated songwriter Carla Williams of Xenomania.

=== Arena Auditions: Girls (11 December 2019) ===
Filmed on 4 December and aired two days after the record label auditions, O'Leary hosted auditions in front of a studio audience at Resorts World Arena in Birmingham. Contestants who made it through the label auditions were invited back to perform in front of the judges panel which also included Lewis. The industry panel from the previous episode were also present.

=== Arena Auditions: Boys (13 December 2019) ===
Filmed on 5 December and aired four days after the record label auditions aired, The boys' auditions got underway. Hopefuls auditioned in front of a studio audience and the judges. Like the girls' auditions, Lewis joined the judging panel and the industry experts panel was also present.

=== Live Final (15 December 2019) ===
The Live Final, held 2 days after the Boys Arena Auditions aired, was broadcast live from the Resorts World Arena, in front of a studio audience of 7,000 people.

- Musical Guest: Dalton Harris ("Cry")

Contestants' performances on the final live show
Band	Order	Song	Order	Song	Order	Song	Order	Song	Result
Real Like You	1	"Independent Women"	4	"Sorry Not Sorry"	6	"Problem"/"Can't Feel My Face"	8	"Be Like Them" (original song)	Winners (55.1%)
Unwritten Rule	2	"Bad Guy"	3	"Dance Monkey"	5	"Love Me like You Do"	7	"Before You Go"	Runners-up (44.9%)

== Bands ==
Key:

– Winners
– Runners-up

=== Real Like You ===
The final line-up of Real Like You was announced at the end of the second episode, where the judges initially stated that the band would be a quintet consisting of Jess Folley, Seorsia Jack, Luena Martinez, Halle Williams and Kellimarie Willis. However, Virginia Hampson was also added to the line up at the last minute, making the number of members six.

Contestant	Age	Hometown	Result
Jess Folley	16	Essex	Winners
Virginia Hampson	17	Essex	Winners
Seorsia Jack	18	County Laois, Ireland	Winners
Luena Martínez	20	North London	Winners
Halle Williams	19	London	Winners
Kellimarie Willis	17	Ryton-on-Dunsmore	Winners

=== Unwritten Rule ===
At the end of the third episode, the judges announced that six boys would make the final line-up.

Contestant	Age	Hometown	Result
Harrison Cole	19	Surrey	Runners-up
Boaz Dopemu	19	Surrey	Runners-up
Caius Duncombe	19	London	Runners-up
Fred Roberts	17	Chorleywood, Hertfordshire	Runners-up
Jed Thomas	16	Meriden, West Midlands	Runners-up
Reece Wiltshire-Fessey	19	Llansantffraid	Runners-up

== Reception ==
The Guardian's Rebecca Nicholson called the show a "peculiar addition" to the franchising, noting that the format felt rushed with four shows airing in the space of week, culminating in a life finale. Overall, she said the format felt tired and predictable, resulting in show that had talented singer-songwriters but a process that wouldn't change The X Factor back into a star-making machine. None of the episodes managed to attract more than 3 million viewers.
