= Erin LeCount =

English singer-songwriter (born 2003)

- LeCount in 2026

Background information
- Born: Erin Ruth LeCount; 21 January 2003 (age 23); Chelmsford, Essex, England
- Occupation: Singer-songwriter
- Instrument: Vocals
- Years active: 2017–present
- Labels: Good as Gold; Atlantic
- Member of: Loud LDN
- Website: erinlecount.com

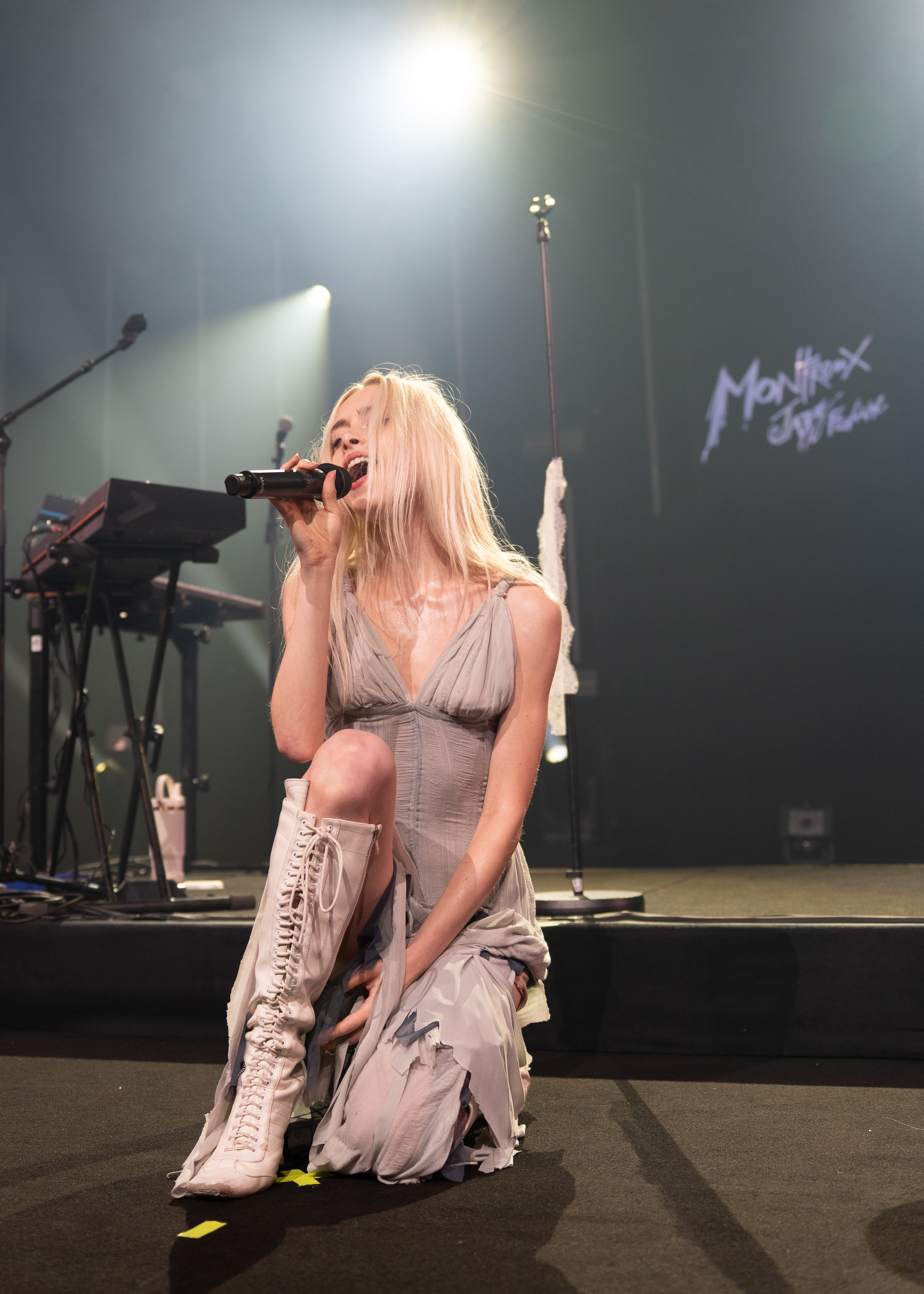
Erin LeCount at the Montreux Jazz Festival 2026.

Erin Ruth LeCount (born 21 January 2003) is an English singer-songwriter. She rose to prominence after competing in the first series of The Voice Kids in 2017, where she reached the final. LeCount has since released music that she has written, recorded and produced herself in her garden shed under Good as Gold Records. She is also a member of Loud LDN. LeCount is also a composer of West End show Inter Alia as of April 2026.

== Life and career ==
Erin Ruth LeCount was born on 21 January 2003 in Chelmsford, Essex. As a child, she never had any formal music lessons, deciding instead to learn herself. She credits her primary school music teacher for allowing her and friends to rehearse at his music venue, the Hermit Club in Brentwood, every weekend from the age of nine. LeCount began writing, recording and producing music in her garden shed in her youth. In 2017, she competed in the first series of The Voice Kids. As part of McFly singer Danny Jones' team, she reached the final.

After performing at various acoustic nights, she got signed to Good as Gold Records, owned by Kurtis McKenzie. She released her debut single, "Killing Time", in 2022. It was followed by the song "Bday Blues", which LeCount wrote on her 18th birthday during COVID-19 lockdown. She described the song as "the feeling of growing pains, nostalgia, changing as a person (not knowing if it's for the better or worse) and dreading not being seventeen anymore". LeCount released her third single, "Heartbreak Hotel", in 2023. Later that year, she released her debut extended play (EP), Soft Skin, Restless Bones. The EP included her first three singles, as well as three new songs. She then released "So Far" with labelmate Causier.

In late 2023, LeCount released "White Ferrari x I Know the End", a mashup cover of songs recorded by Frank Ocean and Phoebe Bridgers, respectively. The song went viral on TikTok. In 2024, Ben Böhmer featured LeCount on the song "Faithless" for his album Bloom. Then in 2025, she released the single "Silver Spoon". The song was another TikTok viral moment for LeCount, as well as being made BBC Radio 1's "track of the week" upon its release. In March 2025, she released the single "Marble Arch", as well as announcing her second EP, I Am Digital, I Am Divine, which was released on 23 April 2025. In September 2025, LeCount embarked on a European tour, titling it the Digital and Divine tour. In late 2025 and early 2026, she released various singles ahead of her third EP, Pareidolia, released in February 2026. The deluxe version of the EP, featuring the new song "The Cinema", which she had performed live throughout her Pareidolia tour, was released on 29 June.

== Personal life and artistry ==
LeCount was inspired to start music by Adele, Duffy and Florence + The Machine, whose voices she loved. She has stated that her musical influences are Fiona Apple, Lorde, Kate Bush, Imogen Heap, Sylvan Esso and Florence + The Machine, while Sampha, Kate Bush and Banks inspired her to begin producing her own music. In July 2023, she become a member of Loud LDN.

== Discography ==
=== Extended plays ===
List of extended plays, with selected details
| Title | Details | Peak chart positions |
| Title | Details | AUS |
|---|---|---|
| Soft Skin, Restless Bones | Released: 17 August 2023; Label: Good as Gold; Format: Digital download, streaming | — |
| I Am Digital, I Am Divine | Released: 23 April 2025; Label: Good as Gold; Format: Digital download, streaming, vinyl | — |
| Pareidolia | Released: 27 February 2026; Label: Good as Gold; Format: Digital download, streaming, vinyl | 29 |

=== Singles ===
List of singles, showing year released and associated album/EP
| Title | Year | Album/EP |
|---|---|---|
| "Killing Time" | 2022 | Soft Skin, Restless Bones |
| "Bday Blues" | 2023 | Soft Skin, Restless Bones |
| "Heartbreak Hotel" | 2023 | Soft Skin, Restless Bones |
| "Heaven" | 2023 | Soft Skin, Restless Bones |
| "So Far" (with Causier) | 2023 | It's Not That Deep |
| "White Ferrari x I Know the End" | 2023 | Non-album single |
| "Faithless" (with Ben Böhmer) | 2024 | Bloom |
| "Silver Spoon" | 2025 | I Am Digital, I Am Divine |
| "Marble Arch" | 2025 | I Am Digital, I Am Divine |
| "808 Hymn" | 2025 | Pareidolia |
| "Machine Ghost" | 2025 | Pareidolia |
| "I Believe" | 2026 | Pareidolia |
| "Don't You See Me Trying?" | 2026 | Pareidolia |
| "The Cinema" | 2026 | Pareidolia |

== Awards and nominations ==
| Year | Organisation | Category | Nominee(s)/work(s) | Result | Ref. |
|---|---|---|---|---|---|
| 2025 | Notion New Music Awards | Best New Pop | Erin LeCount | Nominated | |
