= Amaria BB =

Jamaican singer-songwriter

- Born: Amaria Braithwaite; 2 March 2002 (age 24); London, England
- Genres: R&B; dancehall; soul
- Occupations: Singer, songwriter
- Instrument: Vocal
- Years active: 2019–present
- Labels: Promised Land Recordings, Columbia, AWAL, Stennbraith, XLVL Phoenix

Amaria BB (born Amaria Braithwaite, 2 March 2002) is a Jamaican–Guyanese R&B/Dancehall singer-songwriter.

== Biography ==
Amaria BB was born Amaria Braithwaite, and lives in Hackney, London where she currently resides with her family. Amaria Braithwaite discovered her passion for singing when she was around 8 years old. In 2016, when she was 13 years old, Braithwaite was a contestant on the first season of the British TV show Got What It Takes?, in which she was the winner. A year later, she also appeared on the UK version of The Voice Kids.

In 2019, when she was 17, her debut single "Cha$e the Bag" was released via Black Butter Records. Her breakthrough single "Slow Motion" was released two years later in May 2021. This led her to a deal with Columbia Records, as well as the opportunity to perform at the Strawberries & Creem Festival later that year, alongside the likes of Little Simz, Koffee and Burna Boy. She has been featured on BBC's Radio 1Xtra.

Braithwaite's debut EP What's Done in the Dark was released on 18 February 2022, featuring the breakthrough single "Slow Motion". This was followed later that year by the single "Run", recorded for the Amazon original series Jungle, and the Ding Dong-assisted single "Live Some Life". Her debut mixtape 6.9.4.2 was released on 29 June 2023.

== Discography ==
=== Mixtapes ===
- 6.9.4.2 (2023)

=== Extended plays ===
- What's Done in the Dark (2022)
- Comes to Light 2026)

=== Singles ===
- 2019: Cha$e the Bag
- 2020: hypocrite
- 2021: Slow Motion
- 2021: Fundz (featuring Skillibeng)
- 2022: Secrets
- 2022: Run
- 2022: Live Some Life (featuring Ding Dong)
