= Steve Antin =

American actor

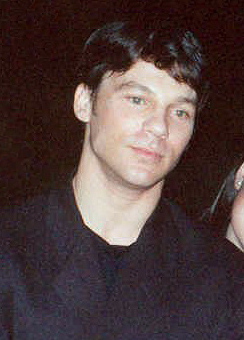
- Antin in 1990
- Born: April 19, 1958 (age 68); New York City, U.S.
- Occupations: Actor; screenwriter; producer; director
- Years active: 1981–present
- Relatives: Robin Antin (sister); Jonathan Antin (brother)

Steven Antin (born April 19, 1958) is an American actor, stunt performer, screenwriter, producer, and director.

== Early life ==
Antin was born in Queens, New York City, the son of British Jewish immigrants. He is the brother of fellow actor Neil Antin, Pussycat Dolls founder Robin Antin, and celebrity hairstylist Jonathan Antin.

== Career ==
Antin was a co-lead in the 1982 film The Last American Virgin, and played Troy Perkins, the bad-guy preppie jock in Richard Donner's The Goonies. He also played Bob Joiner, one of the rapists in the Academy Award-winning film The Accused. Antin starred alongside David Warner in the independent film Drive.

Antin played the titular "Jessie" in Rick Springfield's "Jessie's Girl" video. His screenplay Inside Monkey Zetterland was turned into a film featuring many respected independent performers. In the late 1990s he made several appearances in gay-oriented films including It's My Party, co-starring Eric Roberts and comedian Margaret Cho. Antin himself later came out publicly. Antin also enjoyed a successful career as a stunt performer in dozens of films.

Antin has turned to working as a successful screenwriter, writing such films as Gloria (1999) and Chasing Papi. He also created, wrote and produced the television series Young Americans for The WB.

In the late 2000s, Antin turned to directing. He has directed several music videos, such as Girlicious' "Like Me" and Destinee & Paris' "FairyTale", and in 2006, the feature film Glass House: The Good Mother starring Angie Harmon, produced by Billy Pollina. He is one of the executive producers and creators of The CW's 2007 reality series which seeks to find the next member of the hit pop group, the Pussycat Dolls.

Antin wrote and directed the 2010 film Burlesque, which stars an ensemble cast.

== Personal life ==
Antin is openly gay, and was once the boyfriend of David Geffen. They were together for a little more than one year.

== Acting credits ==
Year	Title	Role	Notes
1982	The Last American Virgin	Rick	
1982	Quincy M.E.	Gar Wyserwitz	1 episode
1983	Sweet Sixteen	Hank Burke	
1983	Silver Spoons	Lege McLemore	1 episode
1985	The Goonies	Troy	
1985	Misfits of Science	Missile Officer	1 episode
1985	ABC Afterschool Special	Scott Tauscher	1 episode
1986	Amazing Stories	Bud	1 episode
1986	21 Jump Street	Stevie Delano	1 episode
1986	Can a Guy Say No?	Scott Tauscher	short film
1987	Penitentiary III	Roscoe	
1988	Survival Quest	Raider	
1988	The Accused	Bob Joiner	
1989	Vietnam War Story: The Last Days	Paulie / American Soldier	2 (of 3) acts
1990	Without You I'm Nothing	Himself	
1991	Drive	The Passenger	
1991–92	Civil Wars	Brandon	2 episodes
1992	Inside Monkey Zetterland	Monkey Zetterland	
1994	S.F.W.	Dick Zetterland	
1994–98	NYPD Blue	Det. Nick Savino	6 episodes
1995	The Marshal	Skye King	1 episode
1996	It's My Party	Zack Phillips	
1997	'Til There Was You	Kevin	

== Filmmaking credits ==
=== Film ===
Year	Title	Director	Writer	Producer	Stuntman	Notes
1984	Beat Street	No	No	No	Yes	Uncredited
1992	Inside Monkey Zetterland	No	Yes	Yes	No	
1999	Gloria	No	Yes	No	No	
2003	Chasing Papi	No	Yes	No	No	Co-writer
2006	Glass House: The Good Mother	Yes	No	No	No	
2010	Burlesque	Yes	Yes	No	No	
2018	Proud Mary	No	Yes	No	No	Co-writer

=== Television ===
Year	Title	Creator	Director	Writer	Producer	Notes
2000	Young Americans	Yes	No	Yes (4)	Yes	Executive producer
2007	Pussycat Dolls Present: The Search for the Next Doll	No	No	No	Yes	Reality television, executive producer
2008	Pussycat Dolls Present: Girlicious	No	No	No	Yes	Reality television; executive producer and co-developer

=== Music videos ===
Year	Title	Artists	Director
2004	Sway	The Pussycat Dolls	Yes
2008	Like Me	Girlicious	Yes

== Theatre credits ==
Year	Title	Producer	Playwright
2024	Burlesque	Yes	Yes
