= Vibe (album) =

Studio album by Caught in the Act
- Released: 30 June 1997
- Length: 52:44
- Label: ZYX
- Producer: Ian Curnow; Jochem Fluitsma; Phil Harding; Ray Hedges; John Holliday; Dave James; Chris Porter; Trevor Steel; Eric van Tijn

Caught in the Act chronology
Forever Friends (1996)	Vibe (1997)	We Belong Together: 6 Years of Success (1998)

Vibe is the third studio album by Dutch-English pop group Caught in the Act. It was released by ZYX Music on 30 June 1997 in German-speaking Europe. The album peaked at number 4 on the German Albums Chart.

== Track listing ==
Adapted from album booklet.

No.	Title	Writer(s)	Producer(s)	Length
1.	"Do It for Love"	Dave James; Keith Beauvais	James	3:40
2.	"Babe"	Dennis DeYoung	Phil Harding; Ian Curnow	4:27
3.	"Never Gonna Change"	James; John McLaughlin	James	4:07
4.	"Wishing You Were Here"	Jörg Dotzek; Oliver Volgt	Harding; Curnow	4:45
5.	"How Long"	Andy Caine; Ali Thompson	Chris Porter	3:54
6.	"Let's Do It"	Harding; Curnow; Julian Gallagher; Caine	Harding; Curnow	3:10
7.	"Runaway"	Harding; Curnow; Bastiaan Ragas	Harding; Curnow	4:03
8.	"Twist of Fate"	James; Benjamin Boyce; Eloy de Jong; Lee Baxter; Ragas	James	4:51
9.	"Crazy"	Ray Hedges; Nate Butler	Hedges	3:32
10.	"Deep Inside"	Trevor Steel; John Holliday; Richard Trevis	Steel; Holliday	4:07
11.	"Won't You Stay"	Harding; Curnow; Caine	Harding; Curnow	4:24
12.	"Baby Be There"	Diane Warren	Porter	4:09
13.	"Best Friend's Girl"	Eric van Tijn; Jochem Fluitsma; Cees van Leeuwen	van Tijn; Fluitsma	3:26

== Charts ==
=== Weekly charts ===
Chart (1997)	Peak position
Austrian Albums (Ö3 Austria)	12
German Albums (Offizielle Top 100)	4
Swiss Albums (Schweizer Hitparade)	14

=== Year-end charts ===
Chart (1997)	Position
German Albums (Official Top 100)	94

== Release history ==
Region	Date	Format	Label	Ref(s)
Various	30 June 1997	CD	ZYX Music	
