= We Belong Together: 6 Years of Success =

Compilation album by Caught in the Act
- Released: 24 August 1998
- Length: 50:23
- Label: ZYX
- Producer: Peter Bauwens; Christian Berman; Frank Berman; Ian Curnow; Jochem Fluitsma; Nick Foster; Phil Harding; Dave James; Michael Rose; Eric van Tijn; Phil Wilde

Caught in the Act chronology
Vibe (1997)	We Belong Together: 6 Years of Success (1998)	Solo 4 C.I.T.A. (1998)

We Belong Together: 6 Years of Success is the first compilation album by Dutch-English pop group Caught in the Act. It was released by ZYX Music on 24 August 1998 in German-speaking Europe. The album peaked at number 29 on the German Albums Chart.

== Track listing ==
Adapted from album booklet.

No.	Title	Writer(s)	Producer(s)	Length
1.	"Love Is Everywhere"	Eric van Tijn; Jochem Fluitsma	van Tijn; Fluitsma	3:57
2.	"Hold On"	Frank Berman; Christian Berman; Jeff Coplan	F. Berman; C. Berman	4:27
3.	"You Know"	van Tijn; Fluitsma	Steve Mac	3:13
4.	"My Arms Keep Missing You"	Mike Stock; Matt Aitken; Pete Waterman	Mac	4:08
5.	"Bring Back the Love"	Mac; Alan Glass	Nick Foster; Michael Rose	4:01
6.	"Don't Walk Away"	van Tijn; Fluitsma	van Tijn; Fluitsma	3:47
7.	"Babe"	Dennis DeYoung	Phil Harding; Ian Curnow	4:27
8.	"Do It for Love"	Dave James; Keith Beauvais	James	3:40
9.	"Let This Love Begin"	Mac; Chris Laws	Mac	4:00
10.	"Runaway"	Harding; Ian Curnow; Bastiaan Ragas	Harding; Curnow	4:03
11.	"Take Me to the Limit"	Phil Wilde; Peter Bauwens	Wilde; Bauwens	3:59
12.	"Baby Come Back"	Phil Radford	F. Berman; C. Berman	3:30
13.	"We Belong Together"	C. Laws; P. Curran	Mac	3:55

== Charts ==
Chart (1998)	Peak position
Austrian Albums (Ö3 Austria)	38
German Albums (Offizielle Top 100)	29

== Release history ==
Region	Date	Format	Label	Ref(s)
Various	24 August 1998	CD	ZYX Music	
