= Thinkin' About Ya =

Single by Timex Social Club

from the album Vicious Rumors
- Released: 1986
- Recorded: 1986
- Studio: Fantasy Studios
- Length: 5:57
- Label: Danya Records, Mercury
- Songwriter: Michael Marshall
- Producer: Jay Logan

Timex Social Club singles chronology
"Mixed Up World" (1986)	"Thinkin' About Ya" (1986)	"Just Kickin' It" (1986)

"Thinkin' About Ya" is a 1986 song by San Francisco Bay Area-based music group Timex Social Club, from their debut album Vicious Rumors. The song was mixed by Shep Pettibone and produced by Jay Logan and Michael Marshall. It reached a Hot R&B/Hip-Hop Songs peak chart position of 15 in the United States.

The song is best known for its melody that was used in many subsequent songs. The basic melodic hook of the song was used by Timex Social Club producer Jay King in his subsequent band Club Nouveau's song "Why You Treat Me So Bad" from their 1986 album Life, Love & Pain. The melodic hook in this last song was subsequently sampled several times by other musicians. Hip-hop duo Luniz interpolated the song on their 1995 hit single "I Got 5 on It" from their album Operation Stackola. That song was then sampled by Sean "Puff Daddy" Combs on his 1999 hit single "Satisfy You" featuring R. Kelly from his album Forever. Singer Jennifer Lopez sampled "I Got 5 on It" for the 2002 Trackmasters remix of her single "I'm Gonna Be Alright" featuring Nas from her album J to tha L–O! The Remixes. "Thinkin' About Ya" was also sampled by rapper Master P for his 1998 song "Thinkin' Bout U" featuring Mia X and Mo B. Dick from his album MP da Last Don. The vocals and lyrics in the song were also sampled in the songs “Everyday” by Adana Twins from their 2012 EP Strange and “Got It Good” by Mi-T featuring Michael Marshall in 2018.
