= Back for Love =

Studio album by Caught in the Act
- Released: 23 November 2016
- Length: 49:23
- Label: H'Art
- Producer: Christian Geller

Caught in the Act chronology
Solo 4 C.I.T.A. (1998)	Back for Love (2016)

Back for Love is the fifth studio album by Dutch-English pop group Caught in the Act. It was released by H'Art Records on 23 November 2016 in German-speaking Europe. The band's first release in 18 years, it marked their first album without original band member Benjamin Boyce. Produced by Christian Geller, Back for Love contains a mixture of updated classics and new songs. It debuted and peaked at number 81 on the German Albums Chart.

== Track listing ==
All tracks produced by Christian Geller.

No.	Title	Writer(s)	Length
1.	"Back for Love"	Eric van Tijn; Jochem Fluitsma; Einar Ihle; Niels Megens	3:34
2.	"My Arms Keep Missing You" (New Hit Version)	Mike Stock; Matt Aitken; Pete Waterman	3:58
3.	"You Know" (New Hit Version)	van Tijn; Fluitsma	3:29
4.	"Don't Walk Away" (New Hit Version)	van Tijn; Fluitsma	3:49
5.	"Babe" (New Hit Version)	Dennis DeYoung	4:22
6.	"Baby Come Back" (New Hit Version)	Phil Radford	3:34
7.	"Let This Love Begin" (New Hit Version)	Steve Mac; Chris Laws	4:00
8.	"Do It for Love" (New Hit Version)	Dave James; Keith Beauvais	3:53
9.	"Hold On" (New Hit Version)	Frank Berman; Christian Berman; Jeff Coplan	3:31
10.	"Bring Back the Love" (New Hit Version)	Mac; Alan Glass	3:50
11.	"Love Is Everywhere" (New Hit Version)	van Tijn; Fluitsma	4:23
12.	"When You Lose It All"	van Tijn; Fluitsma; Joos van Leeuwen; Marcel Schimscheimer; Megens; Ihle	3:39
13.	"Last Christmas"	George Michael	3:48

== Charts ==
Chart (2016)	Peak position
German Albums (Offizielle Top 100)	81

== Release history ==
Region	Date	Format	Label	Ref(s)
Various	23 November 2016	CD; digital download	H'Art Records	
