= Forever Friends (album) =

Studio album by Caught in the Act
- Released: 13 May 1996
- Length: 42:06
- Label: ZYX
- Producer: Jochem Fluitsma; Nick Foster; Steve Mac; Michael Rose; Eric van Tijn

Caught in the Act chronology
Caught in the Act of Love (1995)	Forever Friends (1996)	Vibe (1997)

Forever Friends is the second studio album by Dutch-English pop group Caught in the Act. It was released by ZYX Music on 13 May 1996 in German-speaking Europe. It was released in the Philippines by Dyna Products Philippines (now Dyna Music), under license from ToCo International. The album peaked at number 2 on the German Albums Chart and reached the tiop five in Austria and Switzerland.

== Track listing ==
Adapted from album booklet.

No.	Title	Writer(s)	Producer(s)	Length
1.	"That C.I.T.A. Feeling"	Steve Mac; Chris Laws	Mac	3:38
2.	"Don't Walk Away"	Eric van Tijn; Jochem Fluitsma	van Tijn; Fluitsma	3:47
3.	"Ain't Just Another Story"	Phil Harding; Ian Curnow; Mac; C. Laws; Wayne Hector	Mac	3:55
4.	"Bring Back the Love"	Mac; Alan Glass	Nick Foster; Michael Rose	4:01
5.	"Matter of Time"	van Tijn; Fluitsma	Mac	3:26
6.	"It Should Be You"	Mac; Hector	Mac	3:46
7.	"Zoom"	L. Barry; B. Eli	Mac	4:45
8.	"Don't Look for Love"	Mac; Hector	Mac	3:04
9.	"Silently"	Mac; R. Cook	Mac	4:32
10.	"Show Your Love"	van Tijn; Fluitsma	Mac	3:05
11.	"Forever Friends"	Mac; C. Laws; Tim Laws	Mac	4:00

== Charts ==
=== Weekly charts ===
Chart (1996)	Peak position
Austrian Albums (Ö3 Austria)	5
German Albums (Offizielle Top 100)	2
Swiss Albums (Schweizer Hitparade)	5

=== Year-end charts ===
Chart (1996)	Position
German Albums (Official Top 100)	42

== Certifications ==
Region	Certification	Certified units/sales
Germany (BVMI)	Gold	250,000^{^}
^{^} Shipments figures based on certification alone.

== Release history ==
Region	Date	Format	Label	Ref(s)
Various	13 May 1996	CD	ZYX Music	
