= Solo 4 C.I.T.A. =

Studio album by Caught in the Act
- Released: 23 November 1998
- Label: ZYX

Caught in the Act chronology
We Belong Together: 6 Years of Success (1998)	Solo 4 C.I.T.A. (1998)	Back for Love (2016)

Solo 4 C.I.T.A. is the fourth studio album by Dutch-English pop group Caught in the Act. It was released by ZYX Music on 23 November 1998 in German-speaking Europe. The album peaked at number 54 on the German Albums Chart.

== Track listing ==
Adapted from album booklet.

No.	Title	Length
1.	"I Wanna Stay with You Forever"	3:43
2.	"Straight From the Heart" (featuring Bastiaan)	3:49
3.	"I Just Know" (featuring Lee)	4:01
4.	"Shine On" (featuring Benjamin)	3:06
5.	"You Give Me Love" (featuring Eloy)	4:08
6.	"Still Think of You" (featuring Bastiaan)	3:51
7.	"Wake with a Smile" (featuring Lee)	3:50
8.	"Back Where You Belong" (featuring Eloy)	4:31
9.	"Move It Around" (featuring Benjamin)	3:23
10.	"You Are" (featuring Lee)	3:14
11.	"Tonight" (featuring Eloy)	3:38
12.	"Angel Eyes" (featuring Benjamin)	3:19
13.	"For a While" (featuring Bastiaan)	3:42

== Charts ==
Chart (1998)	Peak position
German Albums (Offizielle Top 100)	54

== Release history ==
Region	Date	Format	Label	Ref(s)
Various	23 November 1998	CD	ZYX Music	
