= Caught in the Act of Love =

Studio album by Caught in the Act
- Released: 19 June 1995
- Length: 48:16
- Label: ZYX
- Producer: Jochem Fluitsma; Steve Mac; Eric van Tijn

Caught in the Act chronology
Caught in the Act of Love (1995)	Forever Friends (1996)

Caught in the Act of Love is the debut studio album by Dutch-English pop group Caught in the Act. It was released by ZYX Music on 19 June 1995 in German-speaking Europe.

== Track listing ==
Adapted from album booklet.

No.	Title	Writer(s)	Producer(s)	Length
1.	"Love Is Everywhere"	Eric van Tijn; Jochem Fluitsma	van Tijn; Fluitsma	3:57
2.	"My Arms Keep Missing You"	Mike Stock; Matt Aitken; Pete Waterman	Steve Mac	4:08
3.	"One of a Kind"	Tim Laws; Chris Laws; P. Curran	Mac	4:07
4.	"You Know"	van Tijn; Fluitsma	Mac	3:13
5.	"I Can't Let Go"	Phil Harding; Ian Curnow; Bill Clift	Mac	3:30
6.	"Best Friend"	Mac; C. Laws	Mac	3:36
7.	"Wipe the Tears from Your Eyes"	Mac; Dave Pearce	Mac	4:20
8.	"Caught in the Act of Love"	Mac; C. Laws	Mac	4:40
9.	"We Belong Together"	C. Laws; P. Curran	Mac	3:55
10.	"A Better Place"	Mac; C. Laws	Mac	4:18
11.	"Let This Love Begin"	Mac; C. Laws	Mac	4:00

Bonus track
No.	Title	Writer(s)	Producer(s)	Length
12.	"My Arms Keep Missing You" (B Squared D Extended)	Stock; Aitken; Waterman	Mac; The Brandt Bros^{[a]}; Giuseppe D^{[a]}	4:08

Notes

- ^{^a} denotes additional producer

== Charts ==
=== Weekly charts ===
Chart (1996)	Peak position
Austrian Albums (Ö3 Austria)	19
German Albums (Offizielle Top 100)	6
Swiss Albums (Schweizer Hitparade)	18

=== Year-end charts ===
Chart (1995)	Position
German Albums (Official Top 100)	34

== Certifications ==
Region	Certification	Certified units/sales
Austria (IFPI Austria)	Gold	25,000^{*}
Germany (BVMI)	Gold	250,000^{^}
^{*} Sales figures based on certification alone.^{^} Shipments figures based on certification alone.

== Release history ==
Region	Date	Format	Label	Ref(s)
Various	19 June 1995	CD	ZYX Music	
