= Jay King =

American singer, songwriter, and record producer

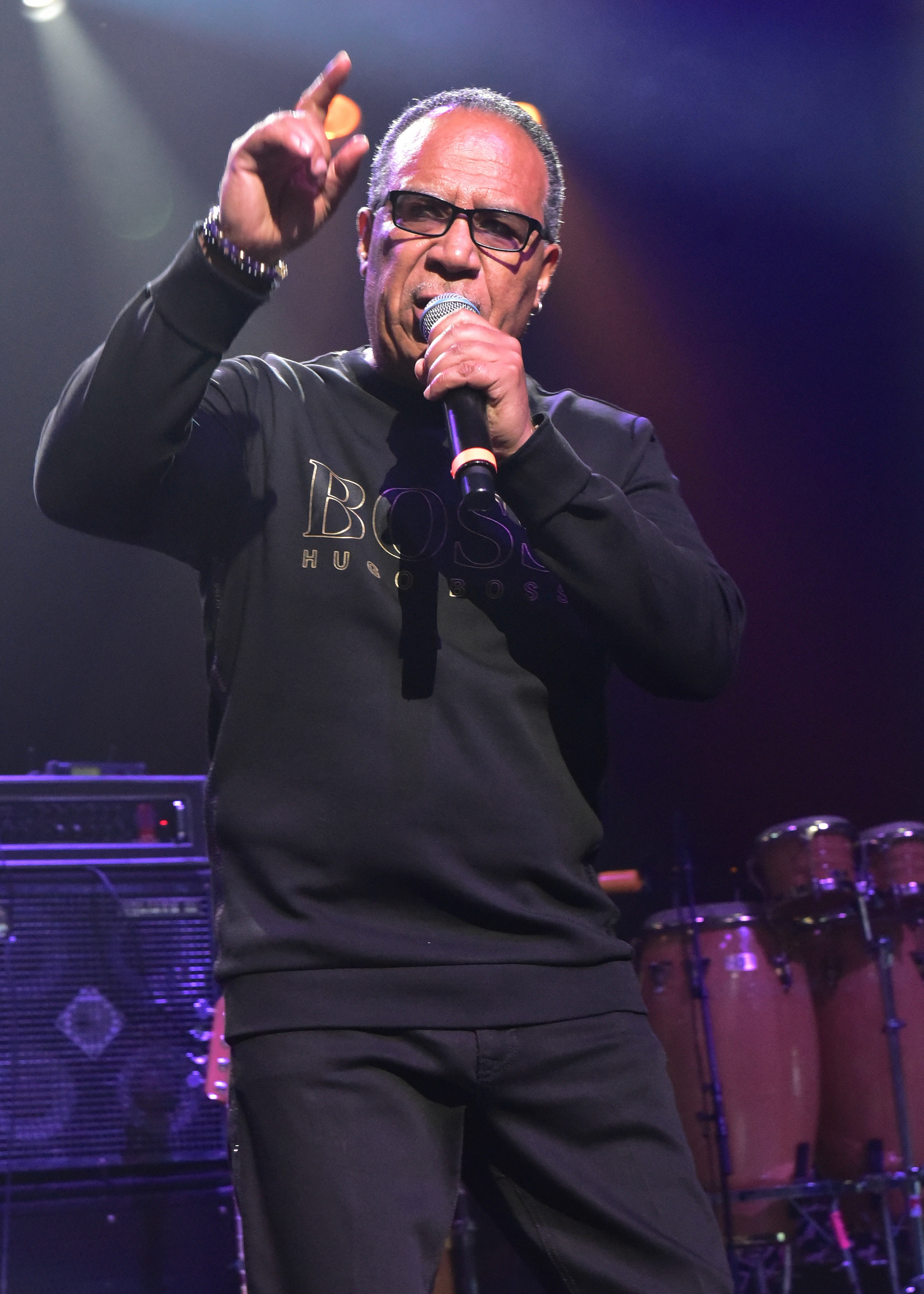
- King Performing in 2022
- Born: January 27, 1962 (age 64); Oroville, California
- Occupations: Singer; songwriter; record producer; label owner; musician; radio show host
- Years active: 1982–present
- Relatives: Saunders King (great-uncle)
- Musical career
- Genres: R&B; Soul; Pop
- Label: King Jay Records
- Website: jayking.me

Jay King is a Grammy-nominated singer, songwriter, musician, record producer, record label executive, music manager, and radio show host. In 1986, he produced, independently released, and promoted Timex Social Club's, Rumors, which charted at #1 on Billboard's R&B chart. He later formed the music group, Club Nouveau, whose remake of, Lean on Me, was nominated for a Grammy Award, charted at #1 on Billboard's R&B chart, and certified Platinum.

In 1986, King started, King Jay Records, partnering with major labels such as RCA Records and Warner Bros. Records, releasing albums for Club Nouveau, Michael Cooper, New Choice, Theresa, and Mikki Bleu. He has released three solo albums, Open Book, Helen's Son, and Soulful Bossa Nova, all of which received favorable reviews. Good Kind of Lovin, from Helen's Son, charted in the top-10 on UK's Soul chart in 2018.

In 2019, he was elected President of the California Black Chamber of Commerce and is the Chairman of the African American DBE Participation Committee for the California Department of Transportation.

== Early life ==
Jay King was born on January 27, 1962 in Oroville, California to parents Helen and Jay King Jr. After his parents separated his mother moved to San Francisco and later to Sacramento, California, where Jay was raised and began playing the trumpet. Jay's father lived in Vallejo so he attended Jr. High School and High School in both Sacramento and Vallejo. He left home when he was 14 years old and was a dancer and entertainer. "I left home when I was 14, I had to be on my own, I didn't want to wait. I wanted to something great. I had to be prepared. Being on the streets prepared me for what I'm doing now", King shared in an interview with the LA Times in 1987. He formed the break dance group, Jay King & the Unknowns, who performed at high schools, parties, and on the streets, garnering a large local following in Vallejo and the San Francisco Bay Area. "I was famous before I ever had a nickel", King shared in an interview with Half Time Chat regarding his success as a teen dancer.

King joined the Air Force and was honorably discharged. After leaving the military he decided to remain in Alaska, where he had been stationed. He formed the dance group, Close Encounters of the Funkiest Kind, which quickly became successful and they opened shows for The Pointer Sisters, Atlanta Rhythm Section, and INXS, among other acts.

King returned to Sacramento and decided to pursue a career as a rapper. He formed the group, Frost, releasing the single, Battlebeat, and for a short period of time was a concert promoter for such acts as Run DMC.

== Career ==
King's career has spanned over 40 years as a singer, songwriter, record producer, record label owner, musician, music publisher, and radio show host. King's first independent label (Jay Records), produced Timex Social Club's, Rumors, which charted at #1 as well as making it one of the top selling independent releases in 1986.

King later partnered with Benny Medina in 1986 at Warner Bros. Records launching King Jay Records, which released Club Nouveau's debut album, Life, Love & Pain. King also released Michael Cooper's album, Love is Such a Funny Game and produced and released Theresa's album, Broken Puzzle which charted at #62 on Billboard's Black Music Chart.

King founded the ILC (Independent Label Coalition), a collective of independent record labels such as, Young Black Brotha Records, Psychotic Records, and Rip It Records, who by leveraging artists album releases and distribution, were able to get paid sooner for record sales. He has managed the music careers of Cameo, Larry Dunn, Kathy Sledge, Club Nouveau, and Karyn White, among others.

King was handed a demo tape of Timex Social Club's, Rumors, and thought it was a great song but needed better production. He produced, Rumors, which he independently released on Jay Records, promoting the 12-inch single to radio stations, dance clubs, and record stores. Rumors became a dance club hit song before going on to peak at #1 on Billboard's R&B chart as well as becoming the most successful selling independent releases of 1986. King did not have a formal contract with the band and the group signed another record deal with Danya Records behind King's back. King had many songs left over from his work with the group so he formed Club Nouveau, whose first single, Jealousy, was an answer song to Rumors that references King's split with Timex Social Club.

In 1986, King formed the music group, Club Nouveau who were nominated for Best R&B Performance by a Group or Duo with a Vocal for their remake of Bill Withers's Lean on Me. Several of their songs charted in the top-10 on Billboard's charts. Their album, Life, Love & Pain, was certified Platinum. The group went on to release five more albums, the most recent in 2015.

In 2022, Club Nouveau's new group formation featured King, Tirzah Hubbard, and J Ali. In 2024, they performed a multi-city tour which included venues such as the SAP Center, Desert Diamond Arena, and Selland Arena. Also in 2024, they released the single, "It's Alright," which received favorable reviews.

== Record labels ==
- Jay Records

King launched independent label Jay Records in 1986 after not being able to get secure a record deal for Timex Social Club's, single "Rumors". He independently produced, pressed, and marketed the 12-inch single to radio stations, dance clubs, and soon the song gained traction on Billboard charts, becoming one the best selling independent releases of 1986.

- King Jay Records

King partnered with Warner Bros. CEO Benny Medina in 1986 forming, King Jay Records, to release Club Nouveau's debut album, Life, Love & Pain, which certified Platinum and yielded three top-ten Billboard hit songs, including Lean on Me which charted at #1 on Billboard's R&B Chart for 2 consecutive weeks. His label released five additional Nouveau albums, as well as albums by Michael Cooper and composed and produced Theresa's album, Broken Puzzle.

King's publishing company, Jay King IIII Publishing, placed several of Khayree's songs on Vanilla Ice's album, To the Extreme.

== Other ventures ==
- Radio

King is a radio show host on Traffic Jams with Jay King on KDEE 97.5 FM as well as hosting his own podcast, Kings in the Morning, on The Jay King Network.

On his online series, Jay King Live, Straight No Chaser, several of the episodes were focused on reparations, with King calling it the debt owed to Black America. He created and presented his own detailed account of a debt owed plan to repay the debt owed to American Descendants of Enslaved Africans.

- Professional Dominoes Association

King was the founder and association commissioner of the PDA (Professional Dominoes Association) which organized and hosted professional domino tournaments. In 2006, he hosted a 12-city tournament. The success of the tournaments led to a deal with ESPN to televise domino tournaments.

- Music Conferences

King launched The Creative Exchange Music Summit to educate creatives in the business of technology, film, television, music, and art.

- California Black Chamber of Commerce

King was elected President of the, California Black Chamber of Commerce, in June 2019, and serves on the Caltrans Small Business Council and is the Chairman of the African American DBE Participation Committee for the California Department of Transportation, as well as the Small Business Council for the California Department of General Services (DGS), and the California High-Speed Rail.

== Discography ==
| Year | Song | Artist | Credit |
|---|---|---|---|
| 1986 | Life, Love & Pain | Club Nouveau | Artist, composer, producer, record label |
| 1987 | Broken Puzzle | Theresa | Composer, producer, record label |
| 1987 | Love is Such a Funny Game | Michael Cooper | Composer, producer, arranger, record label |
| 1988 | Listen to the Message | Club Nouveau | Artist, composer, producer, record label |
| 1988 | At Last | New Choice | Executive producer, record label |
| 1989 | Under a Nouveau Groove | Club Nouveau | Artist, composer, producer, record label |
| 1989 | I Promise | Mikki Bleu | Record label |
| 1992 | A New Beginning | Club Nouveau | Artist, composer, producer, record label |
| 1994 | Everything is Black | Club Nouveau | Artist, composer, producer, record label |
| 2015 | Consciousness | Club Nouveau | Artist, composer, producer, record label |

== Solo albums ==
| Year | Song | Artist | Credit |
|---|---|---|---|
| 2008 | Open Book | Jay King | Artist, composer, producer, record label |
| 2015 | Consciousness | Club Nouveau | Artist, composer, producer, record label |
| 2017 | Helen's Son | Jay King | Artist, composer, producer, record label |
| 2021 | Soulful Bossa Nova | Jay King | Artist, composer, producer, record label |

== Singles ==
| Year | Song | Artist | Credit |
|---|---|---|---|
| 1986 | Rumors | Timex Social Club | producer, record label |
| 1986 | Jealousy | Club Nouveau | Vocals, producer, writer, record label |
| 1986 | Situation #9 | Club Nouveau | Artist, producer, record label |
| 1987 | Lean on Me | Club Nouveau | Artist, producer, record label |
| 1987 | Why You Treat Me So Bad | Club Nouveau | Vocals, producer, writer, record label |
| 1987 | Heavy on My Mind | Club Nouveau | Vocals, producer, writer, record label |
| 1987 | Last Time | Theresa | Writer |
| 1989 | No Friend of Mine | Club Nouveau | Artist, producer, record label |
| 1992 | Oh Happy Day | Club Nouveau | Artist, producer, record label |
| 2007 | Made for Love | Kool & the Gang | Writer |
| 2018 | Good Kind of Lovin' | Jay King | Artist, vocals, producer, writer, record label |

== Personal life ==
King's great-uncle, Saunders King, was a respected jazz/blues guitarist with the 1940s hit song, The S.K. Blues.

In 2003, King and Niki Haris had a daughter, Jordan Ann.
