= Caught in the Act (group) =

British-Dutch boyband

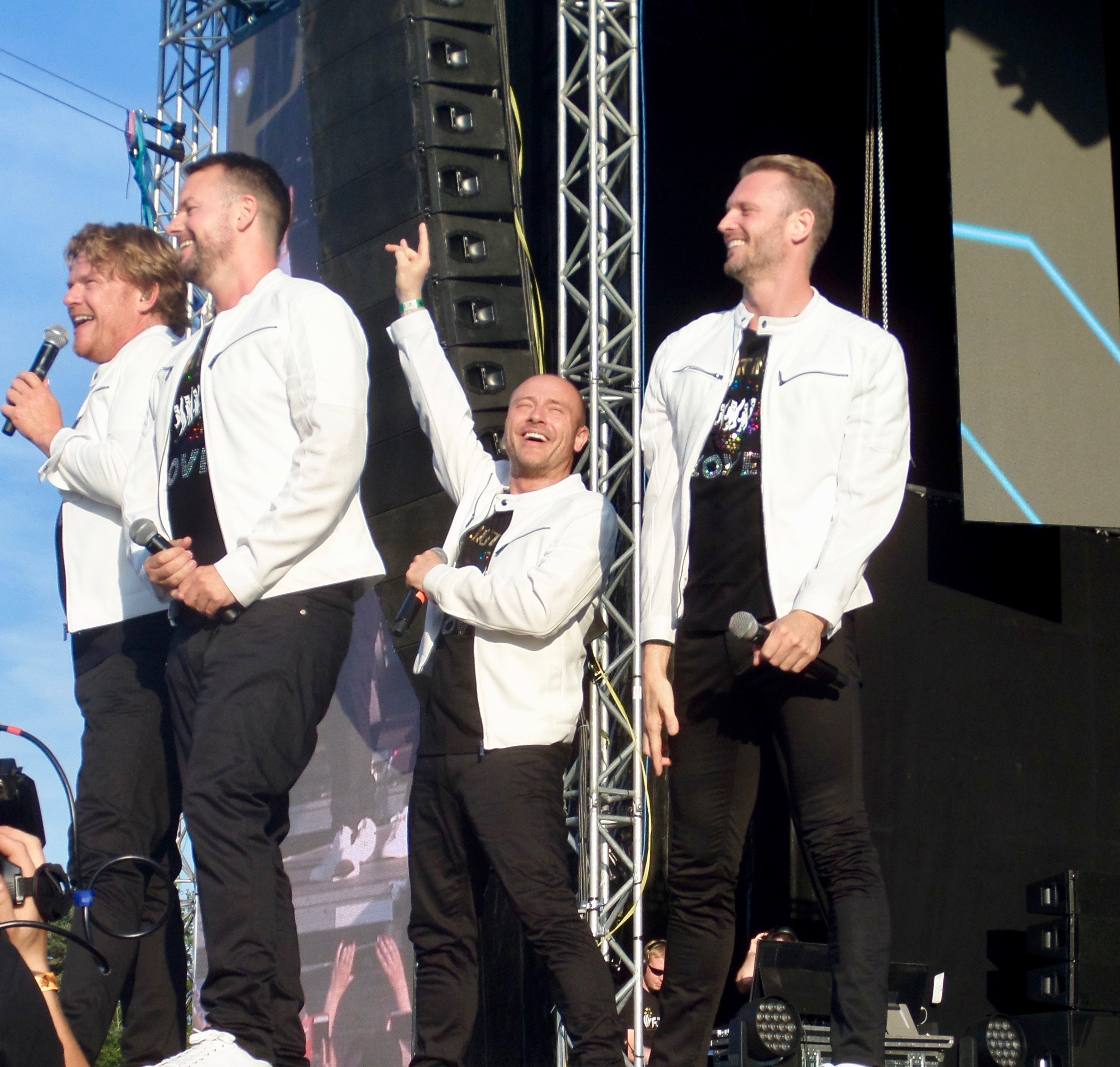
- Ragas, Baxter, Graaf and Hermens in 2019.

Background information
- Origin: Netherlands; United Kingdom
- Years active: 1992–1998; 2015–present
- Members: Lee Baxter; Axel de Graaf; Marcel Vogelaar; Bastiaan Ragas
- Past members: Benjamin Boyce; Eloy de Jong; Sjoerd Hermens
- Website: caughtintheactofficial.com

Caught in the Act (abbreviated as C.I.T.A.) is a boy band consisting of English and Dutch members.

== History ==
=== 1992–1995: Formation and early years ===
Caught in the Act was founded by Dutch record producer Cees van Leeuwen in 1992 with the four original members of the group: Lee Baxter and Benjamin Boyce from England and Eloy de Jong and Bastiaan Ragas from the Netherlands. The band released the non-album singles "Hey You," "Gonna Make U Mine," and "Take Me to the Limit."

=== 1995–1996: "...Of Love" ===
Their first hit came in 1995 with Love Is Everywhere, which reached number 8 in Switzerland. Although not particularly successful in the Netherlands, the band was extremely popular in Germany, where they appeared on the soap opera Gute Zeiten, schlechte Zeiten. Their debut album, "...Of Love," was released along with three more singles: "My Arms Keep Missing You," "Let This Love Begin," and "You Know." "My Arms Keep Missing You" was featured on the dance compilation album "Dyna Club Mix."

=== 1996–1997: "Forever Friends" ===
The band soon released their second studio album, "Forever Friends," along with three singles: "Don't Walk Away," "Ain't Just Another Story," and "Bring Back the Love." The album and singles achieved similar success to their previous releases.

=== 1997–1998: "Vibe" ===
The third studio album, "Vibe," was released in 1997. It included two successful singles: "Do It for Love" and "Babe" (a cover of Styx's 1979 hit of the same name).

=== 1998: "We Belong Together" and sudden split ===
After releasing three studio albums, the band issued a greatest hits compilation titled We Belong Together: 6 Years of Success. The album featured two singles, "Hold On" and "Baby Come Back." Before their sudden split in 1998, Caught in the Act had released four studio albums, one compilation album, and fifteen singles, selling over 15 million records worldwide.

=== 1998: "Solo 4 C.I.T.A." ===
After Caught in the Act disbanded, they released a final studio album titled Solo 4 C.I.T.A. along with the farewell single "I Wanna Stay with You Forever." The music video for the single included footage from all of their previous music videos. The album also featured solo tracks performed by each band member.

=== Post-breakup ===
Benjamin Boyce was the first to release solo material, including his self-titled debut album, Benjamin Boyce, and the singles "10,000 Light Years" and "Changes" in late 1999. He also collaborated with 2-4 Family on their track "Everytime You Go Away" from their only album, Family Business.

Bastiaan Ragas also launched a solo career, releasing singles such as "Still Believe in Love," "Only You," "Alles" (a duet with Tooske Breugem), and "Unbelievable." He released several albums, including the Dutch-language album Zin. In addition to his music career, Ragas became a prominent actor, starring as a leading man in various musical theater productions.

== Discography ==
=== Studio albums ===
Title	Album details	Peak positions			Certifications
Title	Album details	AUT	GER	SWI	Certifications
Caught in the Act of Love	Released: 5 July 1995; Label: ZYX Music; Formats: CD	19	6	18	BVMI: Gold; IFPI AUT: Gold
Forever Friends	Released: 25 June 1996; Label: ZYX Music; Formats: CD, cassette	5	2	5	BVMI: Gold
Vibe	Released: 5 August 1997; Label: ZYX Music; Formats: CD	12	4	14	
Solo 4 C.I.T.A.	Released: 23 November 1998; Label: ZYX Music; Formats: CD, cassette	—	54	—	
Back for Love	Released: 25 November 2016; Label: H'Art Records; Formats: CD, digital download	—	81	—	

=== Compilations ===
Title	Album details	Peak positions		
Title	Album details	AUT	GER	SWI
We Belong Together: 6 Years of Success	Released: 24 August 1998; Label: ZYX Music; Formats: CD	—	29	38

=== Singles ===
Year	Title	Peak chart positions					Album
Year	Title	NED	AUS	AUT	GER	SWI	Album
1992	"Gonna Make U Mine"	—	—	—	—	—	Non-album singles
1993	"Hey You"	—	—	—	—	—	Non-album singles
1994	"Take Me to the Limit"	46	—	—	—	—	Non-album singles
1995	"Love Is Everywhere"	—	—	14	10	8	Caught in the Act of Love
1995	"My Arms Keep Missing You"	—	—	—	26	42	Caught in the Act of Love
1995	"Let This Love Begin"	—	73	27	24	26	Caught in the Act of Love
1995	"You Know"	—	—	—	17	—	Caught in the Act of Love
1996	"Don't Walk Away"	—	—	16	9	10	Forever Friends
1996	"Ain't Just Another Story"	—	—	—	35	—	Forever Friends
1996	"Bring Back the Love"	—	—	—	33	10	Forever Friends
1997	"Do It for Love"	—	—	29	11	24	Vibe
1997	"Babe"	95	—	26	35	—	Vibe
1998	"Baby Come Back"	—	—	31	10	29	We Belong Together: 6 Years of Success
1998	"Hold On"	—	—	—	33	—	We Belong Together: 6 Years of Success
1998	"I Wanna Stay with You Forever"	—	—	39	50	—	Solo 4 C.I.T.A.
