= Vicious Rumors (Timex Social Club album) =

Studio album by Timex Social Club
- Released: 1986
- Studios: Fantasy Studios, Starlight Studios
- Genres: New jack swing, post-disco
- Label: Danya/Reality/Fantasy
- Producers: Jay Logan, Michael Marshall

Professional ratings
Review scores
Source	Rating
AllMusic	4/5 stars

Vicious Rumors is the only studio album from the R&B band Timex Social Club, released in 1986. It contains a re-recording of the group's Billboard Hot 100 top ten and R&B number one hit "Rumors", as well as the follow-up R&B hits "Thinkin' About Ya" and "Mixed Up World". Music videos were made for "Rumors" and "Mixed Up World".

== Recording and release ==
In July 1986, while "Rumors" was still rising on the charts, the Timex Social Club split with producer Jay King and arranged to record an album with Danya Records. The album was recorded at Fantasy Studios and distributed by Fantasy Records in the US (A&M in Canada; Mercury in Europe; CBS/Sony in Japan) and produced byJay Logan. "Rumors" was re-recorded for the album and a music video was made to this new version. Two follow-up singles, "Thinkin' About Ya" and "Mixed-Up World", both reached number 15 on the Billboard Black Singles chart. As "Rumors" became popular outside of the US in the fall of 1986, it was this re-recorded version that charted in Canada and Europe.

The album debuted on Billboard's Black Albums chart on 6 December 1986 at number 65. It bounced around that chart for 41 weeks, kept alive by its singles, but it peaked only at number 29 (on March 21, 1987), and failed to chart on the Billboard 200 albums chart. Timex Social Club disbanded shortly after, in 1987.

== Track listings ==
- All songs written by Michael Marshall, except where noted.

No.	Title	Length
1.	"Rumors (Marshall, Marcus Thompson, Alex Hill)"	5:47
2.	"Thinkin' About Ya"	5:57
3.	"Just Kickin' It (Marshall, Bob Spencer, Chris Jordan)"	5:19
4.	"Only You"	4:18
5.	"Mixed Up World"	5:20
6.	"Cokelife"	4:52
7.	"Go Away Little Girl (Gerry Goffin, Carole King)"	4:20
8.	"360° (Natty Prep) (Marshall, Spencer, Jordan)"	6:27
9.	"Vicious Rumors (Euromix) (Marshall, Thompson, Hill)"	4:18

=== U.S. version ===
- The version released in the United States features a different track order from the editions released abroad.
1. "Rumors"
2. "Thinkin' About Ya'"
3. "Mixed Up World"
4. "Only You"
5. "Vicious Rumors (Euromix)
6. "Just Kickin' It"
7. "Go Away Little Girl"
8. "Cokelife"
9. "360° (Natty Prep)"

(all track lengths are the same as on other versions)

== Personnel ==
- Michael Marshall: vocals
- Jay Logan: vocals, keyboards, drum programming
- Steve McCraw: guitar
- Bob Spencer: tenor sax
- Bryan "Beat Creator" Franklin: beatbox
- Isaiah Mosely, Chris Jordan: drum programming
