= List of number-one singles of 1986 (Canada) =

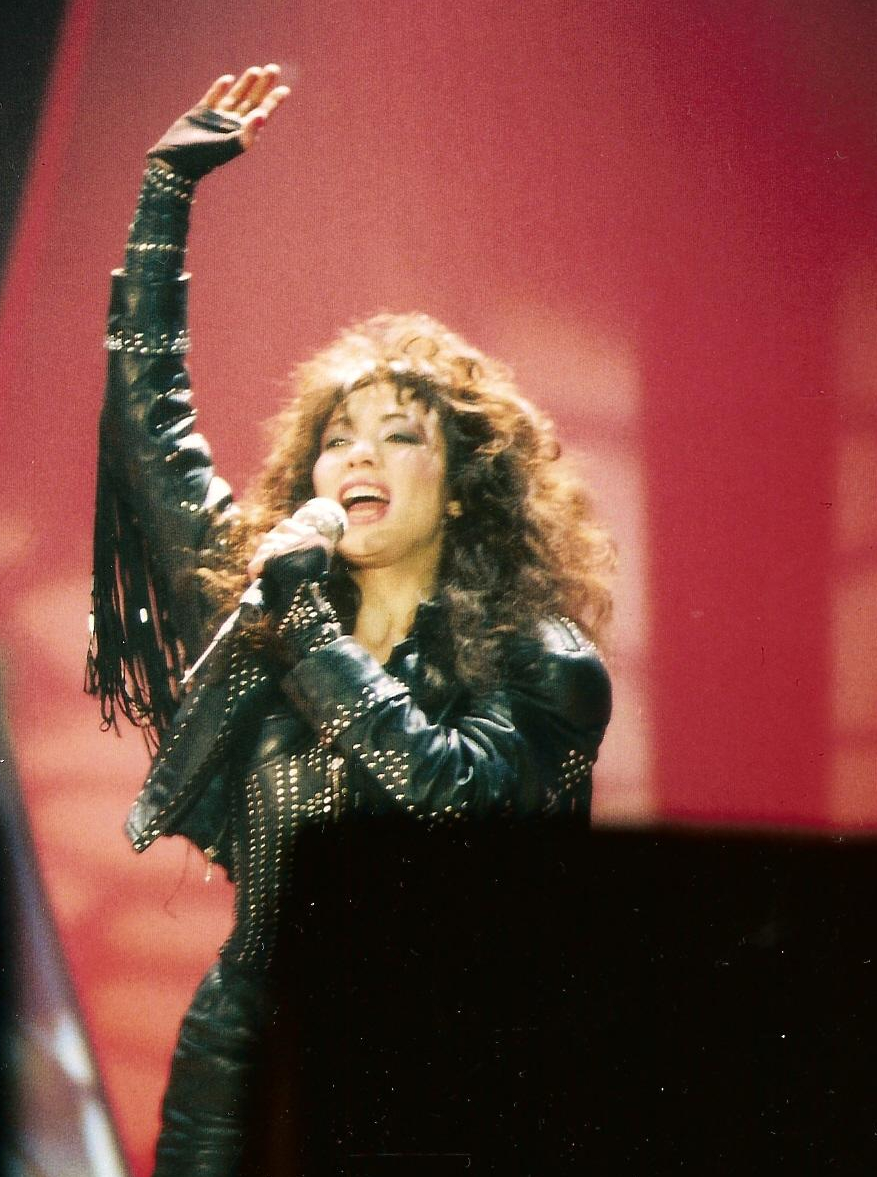
Jennifer Rush spent two weeks at the top with "The Power of Love", Canada's most successful single of the year.

RPM was a Canadian magazine that published the best-performing singles of Canada from 1964 to 2000. In 1986, forty-one songs peaked at number one on the magazine's chart. Lionel Richie's "Say You, Say Me" was the first chart-topper of the year while Bruce Hornsby and the Range stayed at number one into 1987 with "The Way It Is". Only twelve musical acts had peaked at number one in Canada before this year: Lionel Richie, Corey Hart, Billy Ocean, Mr. Mister, Starship, Madonna, George Michael, Huey Lewis and the News, Cyndi Lauper, The Human League, and Elton John and Stevie Wonder (credited as "Friends" on "That's What Friends Are For").

Two Canadian acts—Corey Hart and Glass Tiger—reached number one during 1986, and four singers peaked atop the chart with multiple singles: Whitney Houston, Billy Ocean, Madonna, and Peter Cetera. Of these four, Madonna attained both the most number-one hits (three) and the highest total of weeks at number one (five). Cetera spent three weeks at number one while Houston and Ocean each topped the chart for two weeks. The best-performing record of the year was "The Power of Love" by American singer Jennifer Rush, which topped the listing on the issues of 29 April and 3 May. Besides Houston, Ocean, and Rush, the other acts that peaked atop the magazine's chart for more than one week were Lionel Richie, Mr. Mister, Glass Tiger, Patti LaBelle, Michael McDonald, Peter Gabriel, Timex Social Club, and Chris de Burgh.

Key
† Indicates best-performing single of 1986

== Chart history ==
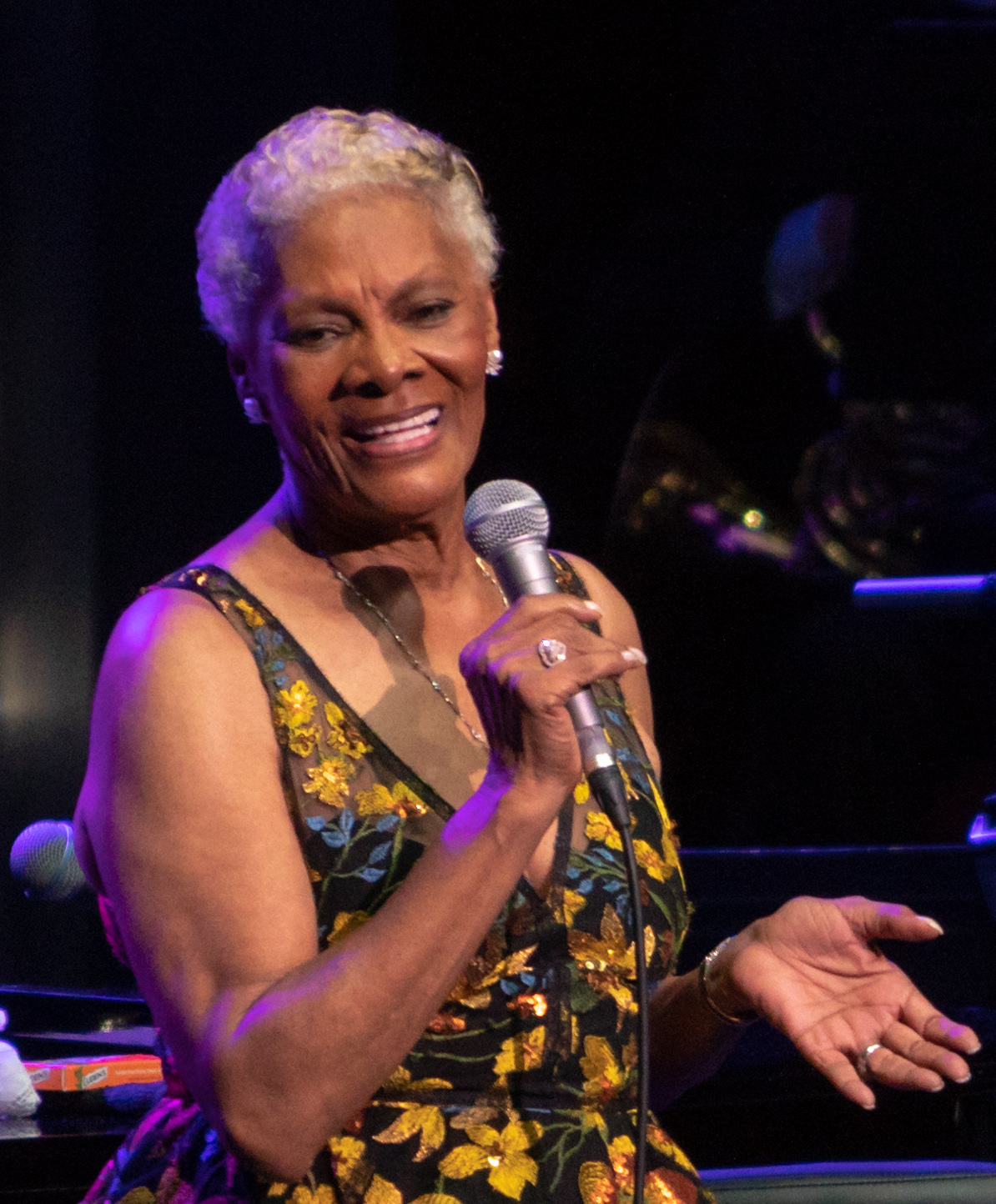
Working with several other musicians, Dionne Warwick reached number one with "That's What Friends Are For".

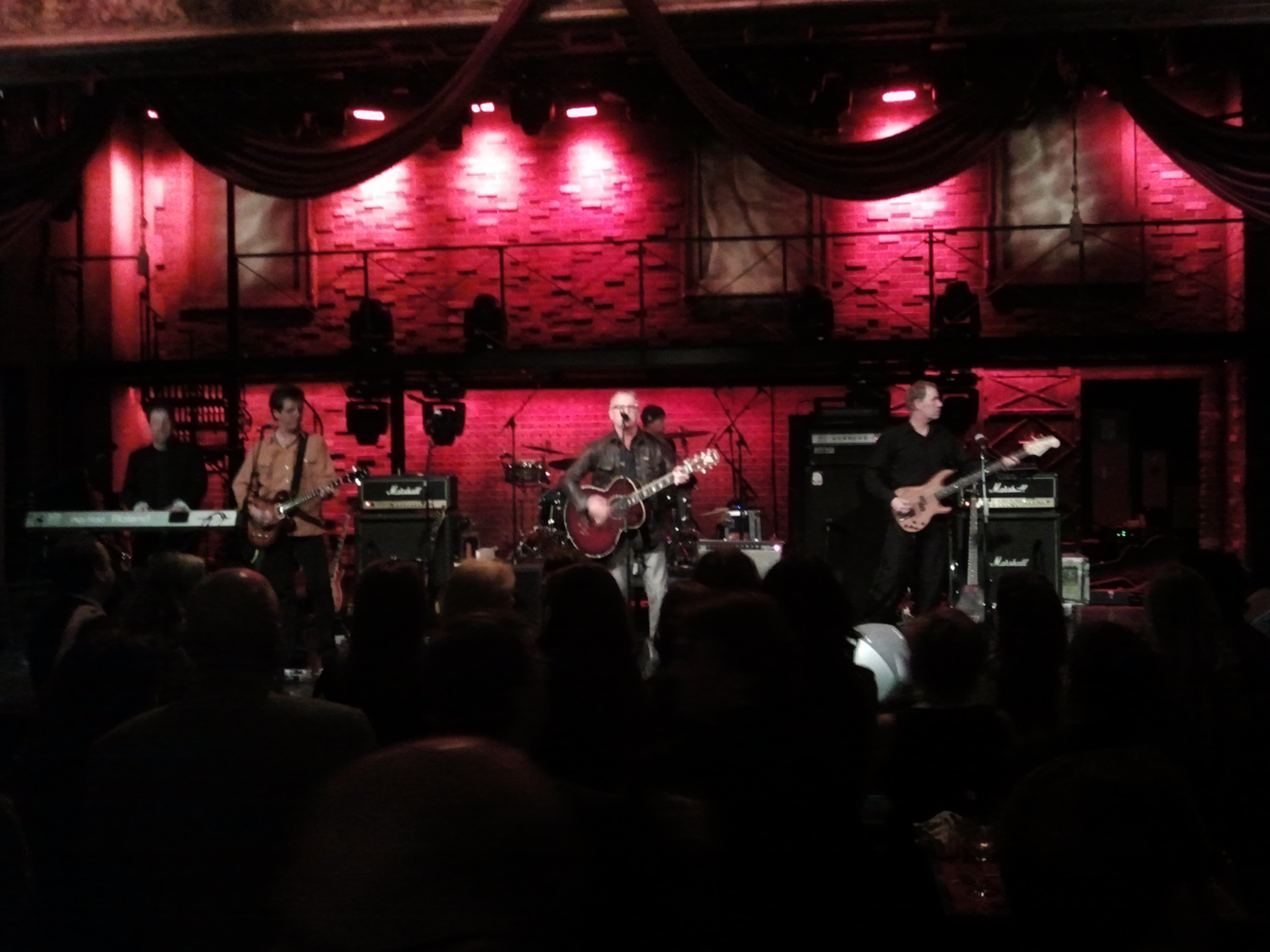
Glass Tiger topped their native country's chart for the first and only time with "Don't Forget Me (When I'm Gone)".

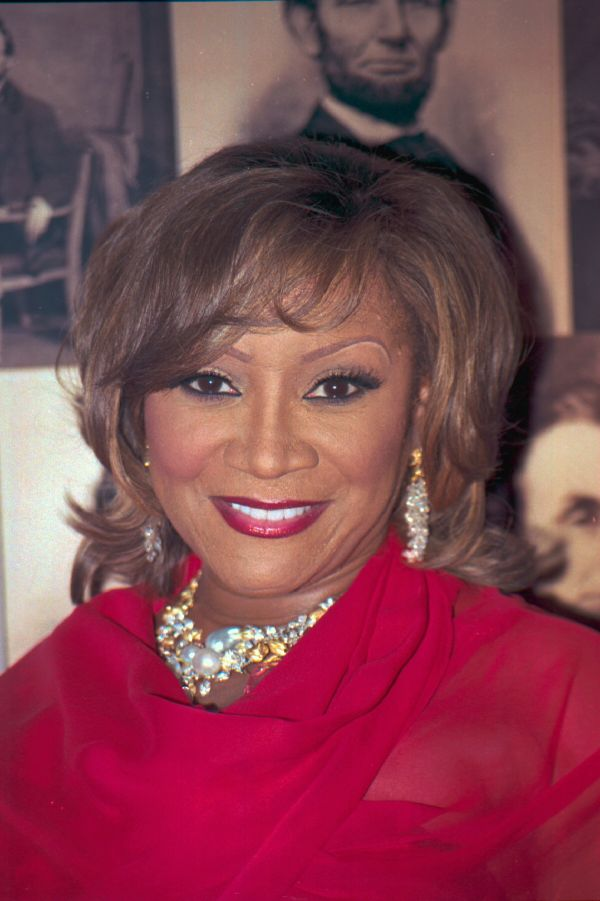
Patti LaBelle (pictured) had a number-one hit with "On My Own", which she performed with Michael McDonald.

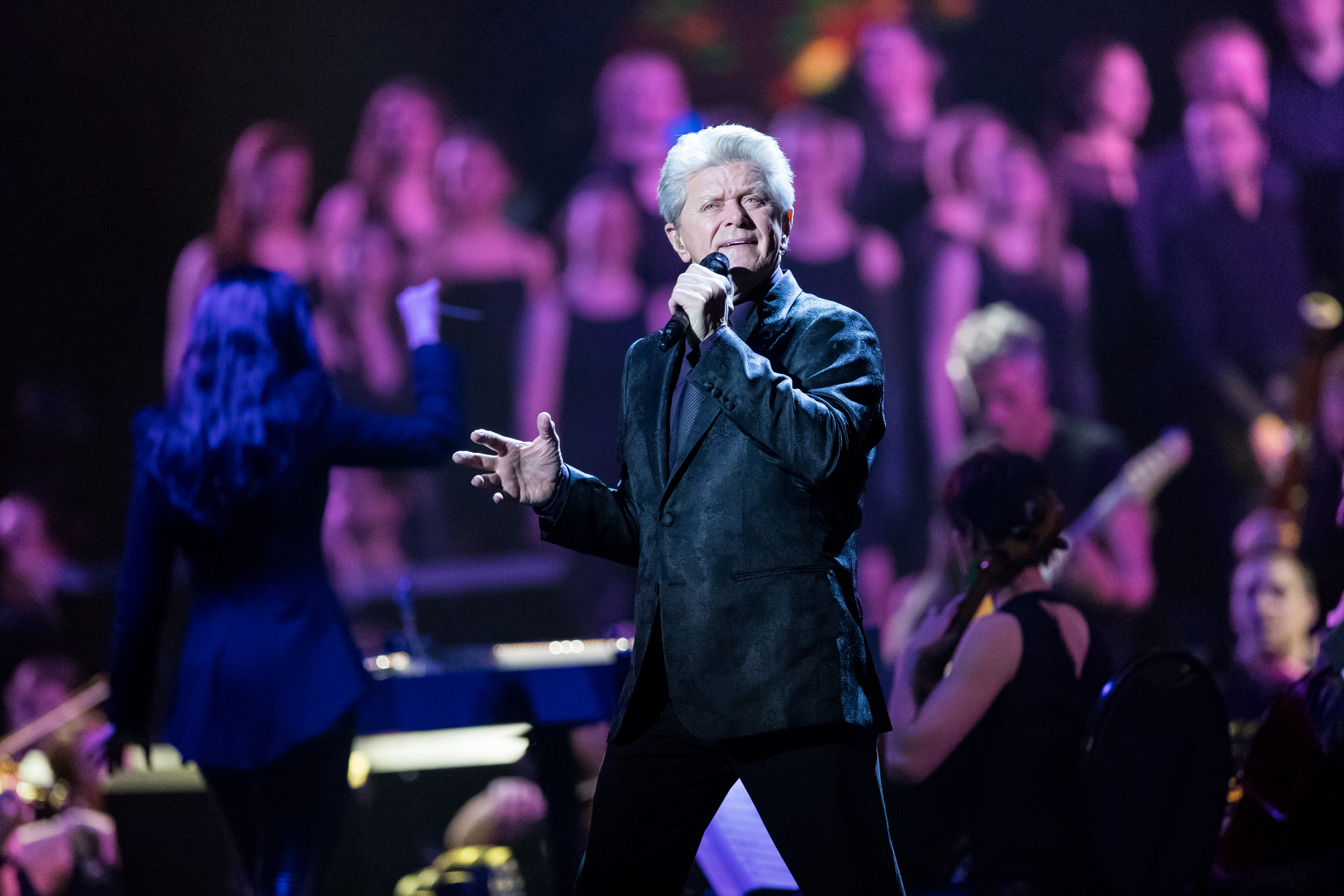
Peter Cetera of Chicago had two Canadian number ones in 1986: "Glory of Love" and "The Next Time I Fall".

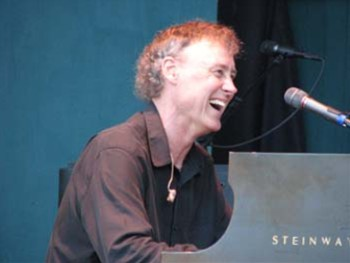
Bruce Hornsby, with his band the Range, ended 1986 at number one with "The Way It Is".

Issue date	Song	Artist	Reference
4 January (Note: Due to a two-week break in publication over the 1985/1986 New Year period, the weeks of 4 January and 11 January are inferred.)	"Say You, Say Me"	Lionel Richie	
11 January	"Say You, Say Me"	Lionel Richie	
18 January	"Everything in My Heart"	Corey Hart	
25 January	"That's What Friends Are For"	Dionne Warwick and Friends	
1 February	"Rock Me Amadeus"	Falco	
8 February	"I Miss You"	Klymaxx	
15 February	"When the Going Gets Tough, the Tough Get Going"	Billy Ocean	
22 February	"Conga"	Miami Sound Machine	
1 March	"How Will I Know"	Whitney Houston	
8 March	"Kyrie"	Mr. Mister	
15 March	"Kyrie"	Mr. Mister	
22 March	"Sara"	Starship	
29 March	"Don't Forget Me (When I'm Gone)"	Glass Tiger	
5 April	"Don't Forget Me (When I'm Gone)"	Glass Tiger	
12 April	"Secret Lovers"	Atlantic Starr	
19 April	"Bop"	Dan Seals	
26 April	"The Power of Love"†	Jennifer Rush	
3 May	"The Power of Love"†	Jennifer Rush	
10 May	"Let's Go All the Way"	Sly Fox	
17 May	"West End Girls"	Pet Shop Boys	
24 May	"Live to Tell"	Madonna	
31 May	"Live to Tell"	Madonna	
7 June	"Greatest Love of All"	Whitney Houston	
14 June	"A Different Corner"	George Michael	
21 June	"On My Own"	Patti LaBelle and Michael McDonald	
28 June	"On My Own"	Patti LaBelle and Michael McDonald	
5 July	"There'll Be Sad Songs (To Make You Cry)"	Billy Ocean	
12 July	"I Can't Wait"	Nu Shooz	
19 July	"Who's Johnny"	El DeBarge	
26 July	"Sledgehammer"	Peter Gabriel	
2 August	"Sledgehammer"	Peter Gabriel	
9 August	"Papa Don't Preach"	Madonna	
16 August	"Papa Don't Preach"	Madonna	
23 August	"Glory of Love"	Peter Cetera	
30 August	"Glory of Love"	Peter Cetera	
6 September	"Mad About You"	Belinda Carlisle	
13 September	"Higher Love"	Steve Winwood	
20 September	"Friends and Lovers"	Gloria Loring and Carl Anderson	
27 September	"Stuck with You"	Huey Lewis and the News	
4 October	"Rumors"	Timex Social Club	
11 October	"Rumors"	Timex Social Club	
18 October	"Spirit in the Sky"	Doctor and the Medics	
25 October	"The Lady in Red"	Chris de Burgh	
1 November	"The Lady in Red"	Chris de Burgh	
8 November	"True Colors"	Cyndi Lauper	
15 November	"Human"	The Human League	
22 November	"True Blue"	Madonna	
29 November	"Two of Hearts"	Stacey Q	
6 December	"Amanda"	Boston	
13 December	"The Next Time I Fall"	Peter Cetera and Amy Grant	
20 December	"Stand by Me"	Ben E. King	
27 December	"The Way It Is"	Bruce Hornsby and the Range	

== See also ==
- 1986 in music
- List of number-one albums of 1986 (Canada)
- List of RPM number-one adult contemporary singles of 1986
- List of RPM number-one country singles of 1986
- List of Billboard Hot 100 number-one singles of 1986
- List of Cash Box Top 100 number-one singles of 1986
