= De Familie Knots =

Dutch children's television series

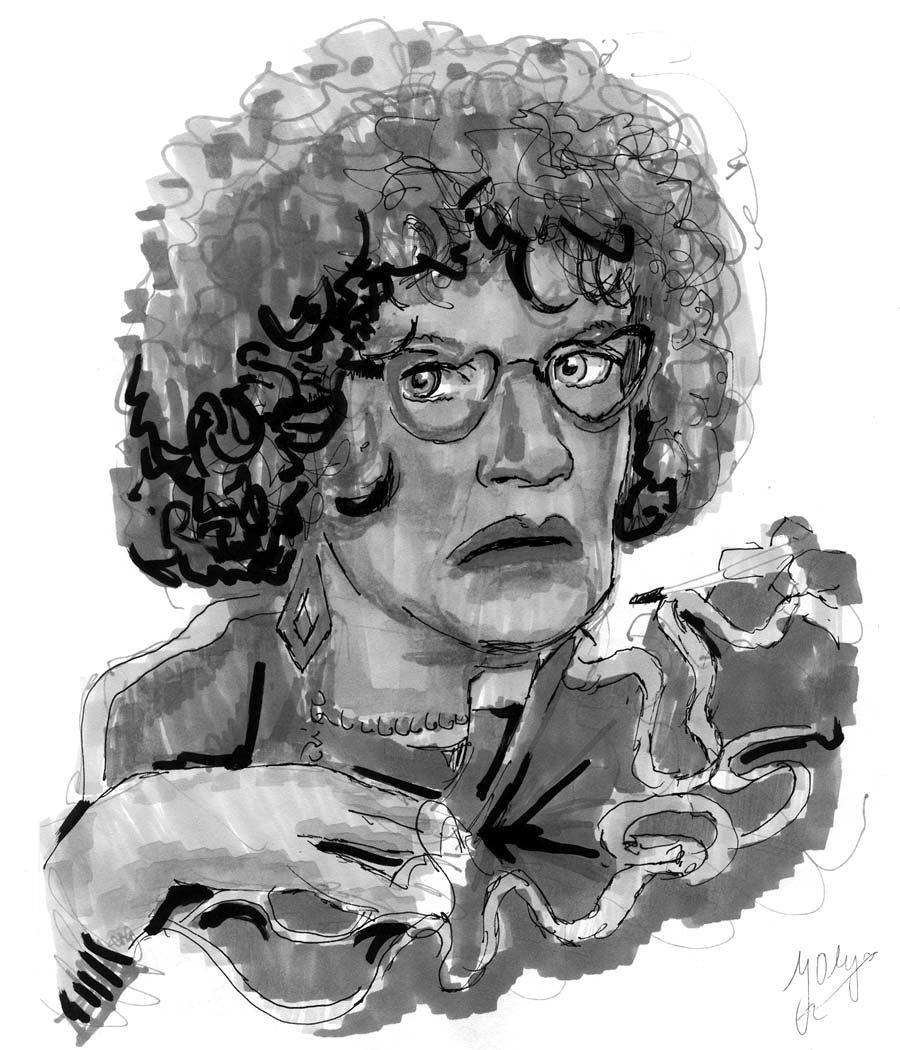
Painting of Tante Til

De Familie Knots (free translation The Nuts Family; Knots being a Dutch expression for crazy) is a Dutch children's television series, broadcast between 22 October 1980 and 27 February 1984 by the NCRV.

== Concept ==
The TV series is set in a comics store, owned by the eccentric Knots-family. The family members are all played by only three actors.

=== Cast ===
- Hetty Heyting - Tante Til, Oma Knots and Hansje.
- Marnix Kappers - Neef Herbert, the Doctor, the PTT man, Vader Vogel, Buurvrouw Pronk and the voice-over.
- Jan-Simon Minkema - Opa Knots, Arend Vogel and Onkel X.

=== Characters ===
- Tante Til (Aunt Til) is a painting artist who holds the family together; her secret weapon is an intoxicating pink paint which she uses in splashes when one needs to be taught a valuable lesson.
- Frederik is Til's husband; he lost his job as a window cleaner for the police since he fell off a ladder. Frederik reinvented himself as 'Onkel X' ('Uncle X'), the family's private investigator. His catchphrase "Hands up, dude, what's your code?" ("Hands up, makker, wat is je code?") drew the attention of a US-impresario; he ended up flying back and forth to Hollywood for acting-roles
- Opa Knots (Grandad; forename Herman) is the founder of the comics store; he hates children and answers the phone by asking "Hello, whose mine speaking?" ("Hallo, wie spreekt mijn?").
- Oma Knots (Grandma; forename Johanna) Johanna) is Herman's wife. She tends to be clumsy and spends all day brewing soup with varying degrees of success. Herman reprimands her by comparing her to a child.
- Neef Herbert (cousin Herbert) is a civil servant with an otherwise unbridled interest in toys and a matching appetite for Til's chocolates which he's not supposed to touch.
- Hansje (cosy name for Johanna) is the niece who works behind the counter of the comics store. At night she attends adult school to get her qualifications second time round.
- Arend Vogel (free translation Burt Eagle) is an elementary schoolteacher who rents the attic. He is fancied by Hansje despite being a few years older. A dose of pink paint makes him realise that he lost touch with his long-haired progressive days.

=== Supporting characters ===
- Buurvrouw Pronk (Neighbour Pronk), the woman next door who's curious for saucy gossip about the family. After a pink dream she gives up her copycat behaviour to care for the elderly.
- Vader Vogel (Vogel Senior) is the man Arend ran way from because they are alike. He attempts to make up with his son.
- Aaf Klaver (free translation Ave Clover) is introduced as Herbert's girlfriend; she ignites his political ambitions, but only to enhance her own status. The relationship falls apart after interference from Til.

== Music ==
Each episode featured a song, written and composed by Eric van Tijn. The songs were performed by Heyting and/or Minkema and released on an album. A compilation, Knots Klips, was broadcast in September 1984.

== In popular culture ==
- Marnix Kappers resurrected his Herbert-specs in 1989 for a series of reports in a tourist-at-home programme.
- In 2014 a documentary about De Familie Knots was partially filmed in Amsterdam comics store Lambiek and broadcast on TV one year later. This marked the first time that the near-entire cast was reunited.
- Hetty Heyting sold her Til-dress for auction, but later bought it back. This enabled her to reprise the character for prominent features in the Sinterklaas-films by Martijn van Nellestijn. In 2017, Til appeared in a Scoot-Mobile-commercial.
