= Lee Baxter =

Lee Baxter may refer to:

- Lee Baxter (singer) (born 1970), British actor and singer
- Lee Baxter (footballer) (born 1976), Swedish footballer turned football manager
