= Stay (2-4 Family song) =

Single by 2-4 Family

from the album Family Business
- Released: 27 July 1998 (original version); 30 November 1998 (Christmas version)
- Genre: Hip hop
- Length: 3:50

2-4 Family singles chronology
"Stay" (1998)	"Lean on Me" (1999)

"Stay" is the debut single by hip-hop group 2-4 Family. It is their only song in which former group member Jo O'Meara features in, as she left the band shortly afterward, joining S Club in 1999. O'Meara sang the lead vocals. A version of the music video has 545,000 views on YouTube as of August 25, 2024.

After the single, a Christmas version of "Stay" was also released.
