= Marnix Kappers =

Dutch cabaret artist and actor

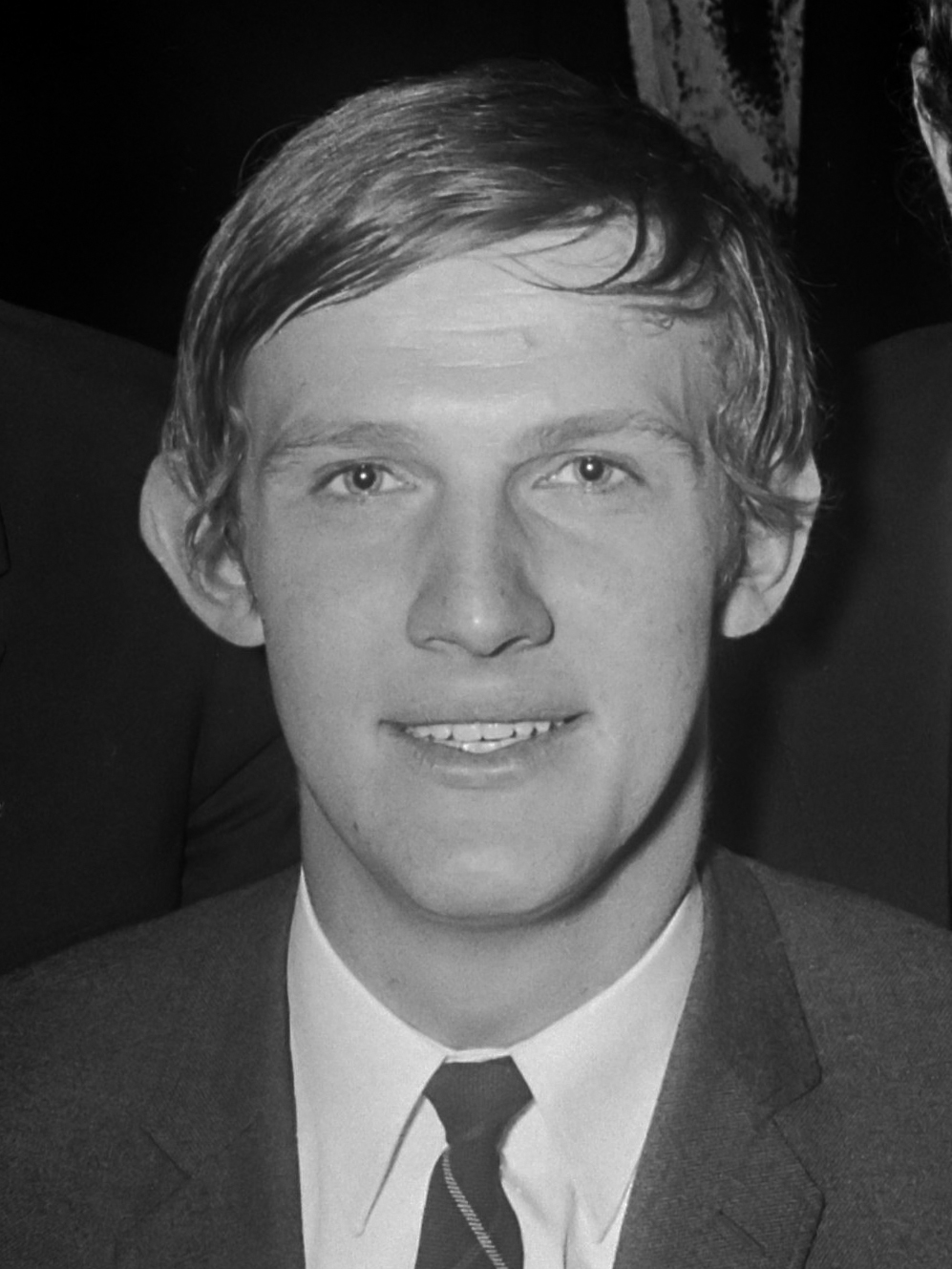
- Marnix Kappers in 1968
- Born: 8 September 1943; Zwolle, Netherlands
- Died: 10 October 2016 (aged 73); Amsterdam, Netherlands
- Occupations: Stand-up comedy, acting
- Years active: 1966–2003
- Known for: Cabaret, television

Marnix Kappers (8 September 1943 – 10 October 2016) was a Dutch cabaret artist and actor, best known for his roles on De Familie Knots (1980), Zonder Ernst (1992), and Heerlijk duurt het langst (1998).

== Cabaret ==
In 1966, Kappers won the Camarettenfestival with cabaret group Déjà Vu and, a year later, he won the Personality Award at the same festival. He worked with Wim Kan and was part of Ivo de Wijs' cabaret group from 1978 to 1980.

== Television ==
He played in various youth series on Dutch television, notably Kunt u mij de weg naar Hamelen vertellen, mijnheer?, Heerlijk duurt het langst, and De Familie Knots. During the 1990s, he co-hosted Knoop in je Zakdoek with Sylvia Millecam, a TV-show for the mentally-challenged. He also provided the Dutch voice of Postman Pat. and appeared in lottery-commercials. His final appearance was in the 2010 edition of Het Sinterklaasjournaal; he played a locksmith.

== Personal life and death ==
Kappers had a long-term relationship with dancer John Kuipers who died in 2013. Kappers himself died in October 2016, with his family stating he was still shocked by the death of Kuipers and while battling severe health problems "could not cope with more sad twists of fate."

His burial was at De Nieuwe Ooster in Amsterdam.
