= Samuelle =

American singer

Samuelle Prater, known as Samuelle, is an American R&B singer who is a former member of the R&B group Club Nouveau. He was the lead singer on Club Nouveau's number one Pop and Dance and number two R&B hit remake of the Bill Withers song, "Lean on Me".

He released his first and only solo album entitled, Living in Black Paradise on October 30, 1990 on Atlantic Records, which reached number 37 on the Billboard R&B Albums chart.

This album featured his biggest solo hit, "So You Like What You See", which spent two weeks at number-one on the US R&B chart, but did not place on the Billboard Hot 100.. It was accompanied by a music video featuring a young Tyra Banks. In October 2004, "So You Like What You See" appeared on the videogame Grand Theft Auto: San Andreas, playing on new jack swing radio station CSR 103.9.

The follow up single “Black Paradise” peaked at Number 24 on Billboards Hot R&b singles chart, staying on the chart for 14 weeks. The last single released from the album was “Greed man” which didn’t appear on the charts.

In 1995, Samuelle released a single called “All That Matters To Me” on Bellmark Records which didn’t appear to chart. Also in 1995, he did background vocals for artists like Alexander O’Neal, Michael Cooper, and F-Mob.

In 2005, Samuelle and his brother d’Lynn released a song called “Don’t Worry, There’s Love In The Ghetto” released independently.

In 2009, he reunited with Club Nouveau and has been performing with them since since. As of 2025, he was still performing at concerts and shows.
