= Family Business (2-4 Family album) =

Studio album by 2-4 Family
- Released: 16 March 1999
- Recorded: 1998– 1999
- Genre: Hip-hop
- Length: 58:58
- Label: Epic

Singles from Family Business
- 1. "Stay" Released: 27 July 1998; 2. "Lean on Me (With the Family)" Released: 18 July 1999; 3. "Take Me Home" Released: 8 June 1999

Family Business is the debut album by hip-hop group 2-4 Family. It was released on 16 March 1999.

== Singles ==
- "Stay" was the only track on the album that featured former member Jo O'Meara.
- "Lean on Me (With the Family)", the second single taken from the album is a cover version of the original by Bill Withers.
- "Take Me Home", the third and final single released from the album and also the last 2-4 Family song before the group disbanded, was released on 8 June 1999.

== Track listing ==
No.	Title	Length
1.	"Stay"	3:50
2.	"Jump"	4:23
3.	"Lean on Me (With the Family)"	3:39
4.	"Brand New Toy"	3:36
5.	"9 Lives"	4:08
6.	"Everytime You Go Away (featuring Benjamin Boyce)"	3:22
7.	"Flame"	4:28
8.	"Who Knows What U'll Find"	3:27
9.	"So Unique"	3:34
10.	"Take Me Home"	3:50
11.	"Stay (Jay's D-Style mix)"	4:15
12.	"9 Lives (clean cut)"	4:08
