= Why You Treat Me So Bad =

"Why You Treat Me So Bad?"

Single by Club Nouveau

from the album Life, Love & Pain
- Released: July 20, 1987
- Genre: Swingbeat
- Length: 5:07
- Label: Warner Bros.
- Songwriter(s): Denzil Foster, Jay King, Thomas McElroy

Club Nouveau singles chronology
"Lean on Me" (1987)	"Why You Treat Me So Bad?" (1987)	"Let Me Go" (1987)

"Why You Treat Me So Bad?" is a 1987 single by Club Nouveau from their 1986 album Life, Love & Pain. The basic melodic hook of the song is taken from a hit by Club Nouveau member Jay King's previous project as producer, Timex Social Club (namely, the song "Thinkin' About Ya").

The song has been sampled several times by other musicians. Hip-hop duo Luniz interpolated the song on their hit single "I Got 5 on It"; that song was then sampled by Sean 'Puff Daddy' Combs, on his hit single, "Satisfy You"; as well as "I Like It" by Mr. Capone-E and "I Know" by Yo Gotti. Singer Ashanti sampled the song for her hit single "Only U", as well as Jennifer Lopez on "I'm Gonna Be Alright".

No Doubt singer Gwen Stefani cited the song as the reason she recorded her solo debut album Love. Angel. Music. Baby., after she listened to it while the band was on tour.

== Charts ==
=== Weekly charts ===
Chart (1987)	Peak position
US Billboard Hot 100	39
US Dance Club Songs (Billboard)	22
US Hot R&B/Hip-Hop Songs (Billboard)	2

=== Year-end charts ===
Chart (1987)	Position
US Hot R&B/Hip-Hop Songs (Billboard)	40

== Sources ==
- whosampled
