= Rumors (Timex Social Club song) =

Single by Timex Social Club

from the album Vicious Rumors
- Released: 1986
- Recorded: 1985
- Genre: Post-disco; funk, new jack swing
- Length: 4:53 (original single version); 5:47 (re-recorded album version)
- Label: Jay
- Songwriter: Timex Social Club
- Producers: Denzil Foster; Jay King

Timex Social Club singles chronology
| "Rumors" (1986) | "Mixed Up World" (1986) |

"Rumors" is the debut single by San Francisco Bay Area-based music group Timex Social Club. It was a top-ten hit in the United States, peaking at number 8 on the U.S. Billboard Hot 100 pop singles chart and number one on Billboard's Hot Black Singles, Hot Dance/Disco Club Play and Hot Dance/Disco 12 Inch Singles Sales charts.

The song was re-recorded for the band's debut album Vicious Rumors and this version went to number 13 in the UK, top-ten in Ireland and a top-five hit in the Netherlands and in New Zealand and was a number-one hit in Canada.

== Background and recording ==
Timex Social Club members Marcus Thompson, Michael Marshall and Alex Hill had written a song "Rumors" while seniors at Berkeley High School in 1984. Aspiring Sacramento-area producer and promoter Jay King heard the demo and offered it to Con Funk Shun, who rejected it. King then arranged for Timex Social Club to record it in his studio.

== Release and success ==
"Rumors" was released as a seven and a twelve-inch single on King's fledgling Jay Records and distributed by regional Macola Records. The long-version b-side of the twelve-inch single was titled "Vicious Rumors". On the strength of King's regional promotion, mostly in the South, the song was added to playlists at major Black music stations such as KKDA-FM in Dallas and KMJQ in Houston.

On April 26, 1986, the song debuted at number 83 on the Billboard Black Singles chart as "Vicious Rumors", entered the top ten in early July and peaked at number one on July 19 for two weeks. The song also charted on the dance charts, reaching number one in both club play and 12-inch single sales in July. The song debuted on the Billboard Hot 100 at number 81 on June 14, 1986. It entered the top 40 in early July and peaked at number eight on August 16 and again on August 30.

By July, while "Rumors" was still rising on the charts, the group split with King and arranged to record an album with Danya Records. "Rumors" was re-recorded for the album Vicious Rumors and a music video was made to this new version. As "Rumors" became popular outside of the US in the fall of 1986, it was this re-recorded version that charted in Canada and Europe.

== Impact ==
The success of the single "Rumors" prompted hip hop impresario Russell Simmons to hire the group as the opening act for 38 dates on Run DMC's Raising Hell tour in 1986, along with the Beastie Boys, LL Cool J and Whodini. Besides solo dates, the group also opened for New Edition, Midnight Star, the S.O.S. Band, Kool & the Gang and Jermaine Jackson. However, despite two other top-twenty hits on the Black Singles chart with "Mixed Up World" and "Thinkin' About Ya", Timex Social Club disbanded in 1987, shortly after the success of "Rumors".

== Charts ==
=== Weekly charts ===
| Chart (1986–1987) | Peak position |
|---|---|
| Australia (Kent Music Report) | 94 |
| Austria (Ö3 Austria Top 40) | 24 |
| Belgium (Ultratop 50 Flanders) | 15 |
| Canada Top Singles (RPM) | 1 |
| Europe (European Hot 100 Singles) | 20 |
| Ireland (IRMA) | 10 |
| Netherlands (Dutch Top 40) | 3 |
| Netherlands (Single Top 100) | 3 |
| New Zealand (Recorded Music NZ) | 2 |
| Switzerland (Schweizer Hitparade) | 23 |
| UK Singles (Official Charts) | 13 |
| US Billboard Hot 100 | 8 |
| US Billboard Hot Black Singles | 1 |
| US Billboard Hot Dance Club Play | 1 |
| US Billboard Hot Dance Music/Maxi-Singles Sales | 1 |
| US Cash Box | 8 |
| West Germany (GfK) | 11 |

=== Year-end charts ===
| Chart (1986) | Position |
|---|---|
| Belgium (Ultratop 50 Flanders) | 97 |
| Canada Top Singles (RPM) | 11 |
| Netherlands (Dutch Top 40) | 57 |
| Netherlands (Single Top 100) | 42 |
| New Zealand (Recorded Music NZ) | 38 |
| US Billboard Hot 100 | 77 |
| US Hot R&B/Hip-Hop Songs (Billboard) | 7 |

== Certifications ==
| Region | Certification | Certified units/sales |
|---|---|---|
| Canada (Music Canada) | Platinum | 100,000^{^} |
^{^} Shipments figures based on certification alone.

== Other notable versions ==
In 1986, a European version was released by Van & His Crew as "Rumors (The Rap Version)".

In 1997, the British band Awesome released their version of "Rumors" which hit number 8 in New Zealand and also charted in some European countries.

== Parodies ==
The song was parodied as "Roaches" by Bobby Jimmy and the Critters, also released in 1986.

== See also ==
- List of number-one singles of 1986 (Canada)
- List of number-one R&B singles of 1986 (U.S.)
- List of number-one dance singles of 1986 (U.S.)
