= Club Nouveau =

American R&B group

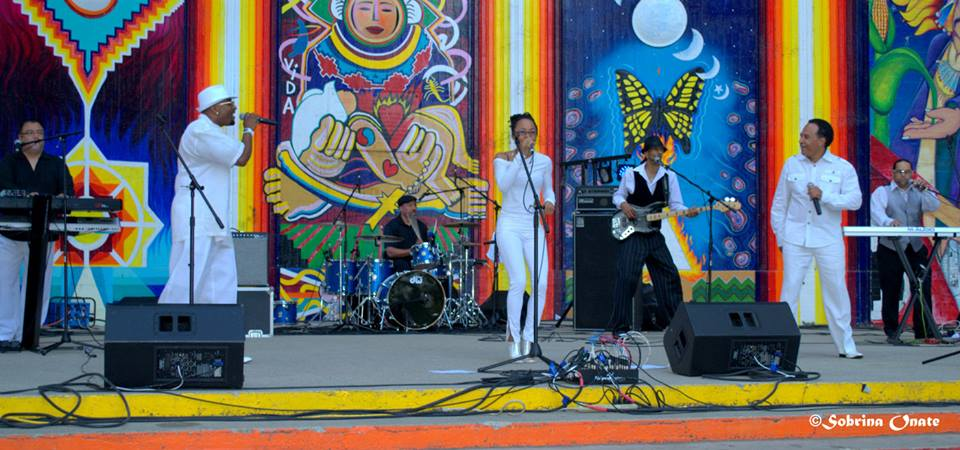
- Club Nouveau in 2013

Background information
- Origin: Sacramento, California, U.S.
- Genres: R&B, soul, go-go, dance
- Years active: 1986–present
- Labels: Warner Bros. (1986–1991); Cleopatra Records
- Spinoff of: Timex Social Club
- Members: Jay King; Valerie Watson English; Samuelle Prater
- Past members: Denzil Foster; Thomas McElroy; Kevin Irving; David Agent; Roque LaCrosby; Walter Phillips; James L. Richard II; Mario Corbino
- Website: clubnouveau.me

Club Nouveau (/nuːvoʊ/) is an American R&B group formed by record producer/performer Jay King in 1986 in Sacramento, California, following the breakup of the Timex Social Club. The group's name (French for "New Club") was changed from its original incarnation, "Jet Set", to capitalize on the breakup. The group was signed by Warner Bros. Records, on which Club Nouveau released its first three albums. Club Nouveau's go-go version of Bill Withers's song "Lean on Me" won a Grammy Award for Best R&B Song in 1987.

== History ==
From its debut album, Life, Love & Pain, which was released in 1986, the group scored four consecutive hits: "Jealousy" (essentially an answer song responding to Timex Social Club's hit "Rumors"), "Situation #9", "Lean on Me" and "Why You Treat Me So Bad". The latter two both made it to #2 on the Billboard R&B chart the next year, with "Lean on Me" going on to become a big Billboard Hot 100 hit. "Jealousy" also made an appearance on the soundtrack for the film Modern Girls. "Why You Treat Me So Bad" was interpolated by the hip-hop duo Luniz, on its hit single "I Got 5 on It", and subsequently by rapper/record producer Puff Daddy on his #1 R&B single "Satisfy You".

The group's original lineup consisted of Jay King, Valerie Watson, Samuelle Prater, Denzil Foster, and Thomas McElroy. Foster and McElroy soon left to form their own production team and focus on working with other acts. Prater, who had performed lead vocals on "Lean on Me", eventually left as well to pursue a solo career but reunited with the group in 2009.

The group's next albums—beginning with Listen to the Message—were laced with an evolving social consciousness. Notable recordings include "You Ain't No Friend of Mine" from Under A Nouveau Groove; a dancehall-influenced version of the Gospel classic "Oh, Happy Day", from A New Beginning; "Let It Go" from Everything Is Black; and "What Kind of Love" from The Collection Volume I. The group also recorded "Step by Step" for the Who's That Girl soundtrack.

Club Nouveau was nominated for a Grammy for Best R&B Performance in 1987. The group's version of "Lean on Me" was its most celebrated hit, resulting in a Grammy nomination for Song of the Year in addition to winning the Grammy for Best R&B Song that same year. "Lean on Me" was also nominated for two American Music Awards, nominated and won a Bammy Award, a BRE Drummer award, a Bay Area Star award and it won two NARM (National Association of Recording Merchandisers) awards.

The 2015 lineup consists of King, Watson, and Prater.

In 2017, as part of Warner Music's divestment requirements as a result of its purchase of Parlophone, the group's Warner Bros. recordings were acquired by Tommy Boy Records, which worked 12-inch singles from its first album to clubs as a result of its emerging relationship with Warner and from being an expert in the format.

== Discography ==
=== Studio albums ===
Year	Title	Peak chart positions							Certifications
Year	Title	US	US R&B	AUS	CAN	GER	NL	NZ	Certifications
1986	Life, Love & Pain: Release date: December 6, 1986; Label: Warner Bros.	6	2	90	13	65	69	9	RIAA: Platinum
1988	Listen to the Message: Release date: May 24, 1988; Label: Warner Bros.	98	44	—	—	—	—	—	
1989	Under a Nouveau Groove: Release date: November 7, 1989; Label: Warner Bros.	—	39	—	—	—	—	—	
1992	A New Beginning: Release date: April 30, 1992; Label: JVK	—	80	—	—	—	—	—	
1995	Everything Is Black: Release date: October 10, 1995; Label: Rip-It	—	—	—	—	—	—	—	
2015	Consciousness: Release date: June 2015; Label: Nouveau Music, Faze One Records	—	—	—	—	—	—	—	
"—" denotes a recording that did not chart or was not released in that territory.

=== Singles ===
Year	Single	Peak chart positions										Certifications	Album
Year	Single	US	US R&B	US Dan	AUS	CAN	GER	IRE	NL	NZ	UK	Certifications	Album
1986	"Jealousy"	—	8	38	—	—	—	—	—	—	80		Life, Love & Pain
1986	"Situation #9"	—	4	—	—	—	—	—	—	—	—		Life, Love & Pain
1987	"Lean on Me"	1	2	1	5	1	9	5	4	1	3	RIAA: Gold; BPI: Silver	Life, Love & Pain
1987	"Why You Treat Me So Bad"	39	2	22	—	—	—	—	96	—	—		Life, Love & Pain
1987	"Let Me Go"	—	—	—	—	—	—	—	—	—	—		Life, Love & Pain
1987	"Heavy on My Mind"	—	42	—	—	—	—	—	—	—	—		Life, Love & Pain
1988	"It's a Cold, Cold World!"	—	34	—	—	—	—	—	—	—	—		Listen to the Message
1988	"For the Love of Francis"	—	—	—	—	—	—	—	—	—	—		Listen to the Message
1988	"Envious"	—	—	—	—	—	—	—	—	—	—		Listen to the Message
1989	"No Friend of Mine"	—	12	—	—	—	—	—	—	—	—		Under a Nouveau Groove
1990	"Under a Nouveau Groove"	—	—	—	—	—	—	—	—	—	—		Under a Nouveau Groove
1990	"Momentary Lover"	—	—	—	—	—	—	—	—	—	—		Under a Nouveau Groove
1992	"Oh Happy Day"	—	45	—	—	—	—	—	—	—	—		A New Beginning
1993	"When Will You Come Back to Me?"	—	—	—	—	—	—	—	—	—	—		A New Beginning
1994	"Ghetto Swang"	—	—	—	—	—	—	—	—	—	—		Everything Is Black
1995	"Let It Go" (featuring Thrill Da Playa of the 69 Boyz)	—	—	—	—	—	—	—	—	—	—		Everything Is Black
1998	"What Kind of Love (Secret Rendezvous)"	—	—	—	—	—	—	—	—	—	—		The Collection Volume 1
"—" denotes a recording that did not chart or was not released in that territory.

== See also ==
- List of number-one hits (United States)
- List of artists who reached number one on the Hot 100 (U.S.)
- List of number-one dance hits (United States)
- List of artists who reached number one on the U.S. Dance chart
- Grammy Award for Best R&B Song
- Grammy Award for Best R&B Performance by a Duo or Group with Vocals
- 30th Annual Grammy Awards
