= Under a Nouveau Groove =

Studio album by Club Nouveau
- Released: October 23, 1989
- Recorded: 1989
- Genres: R&B, downtempo
- Length: 55:10
- Labels: Warner Bros. Records; 25991
- Producers: Jay King; Christopher F. Dixon; Morris Rentie, Jr.

Club Nouveau chronology
Listen to the Message (1988)	Under a Nouveau Groove (1989)	A New Beginning (1992)

Professional ratings
Review scores
Source	Rating
Allmusic	3/5 stars

Under a Nouveau Groove is the third studio album by American contemporary R&B group Club Nouveau. It was released October 23, 1989 on Warner Bros. Records.

== Track listing ==
1. "No Friend of Mine" — 4:27
2. "Under a Nouveau Groove" — 5:33
3. "Momentary Lover" — 5:47
4. "I'm Sorry (a.k.a. I'm So Sorry)" — 4:37
5. "No Secrets" — 4:33
6. "Share Your Love" — 5:47
7. "Time" — 4:36
8. "Money Can't Buy You Love" — 5:27
9. "Still in Love" — 4:56
10. "Let Me Know" — 4:51
11. "Under a Nouveau Groove...the Story" — 4:36

== Charts ==
Chart (1989)	Peak position
Blues & Soul Hiplist	19
Billboard Top Black Albums	39
