= List of number-one albums of 1986 (Canada) =

These are the Canadian number-one albums of 1986. The charts were compiled and published by RPM every Saturday.

== Number-one albums ==
†	This indicates the best performing album of the year.

Issue date	Album	Artist	Ref.
January 4	Afterburner	ZZ Top	
January 11	Afterburner	ZZ Top	
January 18	Afterburner	ZZ Top	
January 25	Brothers in Arms	Dire Straits	
February 1	Brothers in Arms	Dire Straits	
February 8	Brothers in Arms	Dire Straits	
February 15	Brothers in Arms	Dire Straits	
February 22	Brothers in Arms	Dire Straits	
March 1	Brothers in Arms	Dire Straits	
March 8	Whitney Houston †	Whitney Houston	
March 15	Whitney Houston †	Whitney Houston	
March 22	Whitney Houston †	Whitney Houston	
March 29	Whitney Houston †	Whitney Houston	
April 5	Whitney Houston †	Whitney Houston	
April 12	Whitney Houston †	Whitney Houston	
April 19	Whitney Houston †	Whitney Houston	
April 26	Whitney Houston †	Whitney Houston	
May 3	Whitney Houston †	Whitney Houston	
May 10	Whitney Houston †	Whitney Houston	
May 17	Whitney Houston †	Whitney Houston	
May 24	Whitney Houston †	Whitney Houston	
May 31	Whitney Houston †	Whitney Houston	
June 7	Whitney Houston †	Whitney Houston	
June 14	Whitney Houston †	Whitney Houston	
June 21	Whitney Houston †	Whitney Houston	
June 28	Whitney Houston †	Whitney Houston	
July 5	Whitney Houston †	Whitney Houston	
July 12	So	Peter Gabriel	
July 19	So	Peter Gabriel	
July 26	Invisible Touch	Genesis	
August 2	Invisible Touch	Genesis	
August 9	True Blue	Madonna	
August 16	True Blue	Madonna	
August 23	True Blue	Madonna	
August 30	True Blue	Madonna	
September 6	True Blue	Madonna	
September 13	True Blue	Madonna	
September 20	True Blue	Madonna	
September 27	True Blue	Madonna	
October 4	True Blue	Madonna	
October 11	True Blue	Madonna	
October 18	True Blue	Madonna	
October 25	Fore!	Huey Lewis and the News	
November 1	Fore!	Huey Lewis and the News	
November 8	True Blue	Madonna	
November 15	True Blue	Madonna	
November 22	Third Stage	Boston	
November 29	Graceland	Paul Simon	
December 6	Live/1975-85	Bruce Springsteen & The E Street Band	
December 13	Live/1975-85	Bruce Springsteen & The E Street Band	
December 20	Live/1975-85	Bruce Springsteen & The E Street Band	
December 27	Live/1975-85	Bruce Springsteen & The E Street Band	

== See also ==
- List of Canadian number-one singles of 1986
