= 2-4 Family =

German band

- Origin: Germany
- Genres: Hip hop
- Years active: 1996–2000, 2006
- Label: Epic (International)
- Past members: Jay Dogg; Joseph Jazz; Essence Woods; Joanna Biscardine; Jo O'Meara

2-4 Family was a hip hop group that formed in Germany in the late 1990s. The original line-up consisted of English singer Jo O'Meara, and Americans Jay Dogg, Joseph Jazz and Essence Woods.

== History ==
Jay Dogg and Joseph Jazz met each other in the United States Army in 1989 and became friends. They were both DJs, but decided that Dogg would be the DJ and Jazz would be the rapper. As a duo, they entered several talent competitions. When visiting Germany in 1997, they came across Essence Woods at a party. British singer Jo O'Meara was a friend of Woods, so all of them formed the group 2-4 Family in 1998.

== Career ==
2-4 Family released their first single, "Stay", in mid-1998. The song featured lead female vocals from O'Meara, and rapping from the other three members. Along with other vocalists, 2-4 Family recorded "Hand in Hand for Children - Children of the World". A week after that had been released, "Stay" was re-released for the holiday season. 2-4 Family also joined with other vocalists to release a cover version of Wham!'s hit single "Last Christmas" under the moniker Rap Allstars.

Shortly after this, O'Meara successfully auditioned to become a part of the soon to be created pop group S Club 7 and left 2-4 Family, leaving the group with three members. Parklane Music received a demo of "Killing Me Softly", recorded by a woman named Joanna Biscardine. She soon joined the group, and 2-4 Family released their second single, "Lean on Me (With the Family)" in January 1999. It reached the top 10 charts of Austria, Switzerland and Germany and No. 69 on the UK Singles Chart.

Two months later, 2-4 Family released their sole album, Family Business. The album contained twelve tracks, including different mixes of some of the songs. The final single by the group was released in mid-1999, titled "Take Me Home".

The group went their separate ways in early 2000. Another group with the same name was formed, but with none of the five members that had once been a part of 2-4 Family. The recreation did not work out and they soon disbanded after an unsuccessful single.

== Discography ==
=== Singles ===
Year	Single	Peak chart positions					Certifications (sales thresholds)	Album
Year	Single	AUT	FRA	GER	NED	SUI	Certifications (sales thresholds)	Album
1998	"Stay"	24	99	8	57	11	GER: Gold	Family Business
1999	"Lean on Me (With the Family)"	6	—	9	—	7		Family Business
1999	"Take Me Home"	—	—	79	—	—		Family Business
2006	"Stand Up!"	—	—	-	—	—		Non-album singles
"—" denotes releases that did not chart
