= Scoot-Mobile =

Defunct American motor vehicle manufacturer

The Scoot-Mobile prototype was built mostly from aircraft parts, manufactured by the Norman Anderson Co in Corunna, Michigan in 1946. The Scoot-Mobile was a 3-wheeler with automatic gear change, 3 wheel brakes, and could reach a top speed of 40 mph.
