= Timex Social Club =

American R&B group

- Also known as: TSC; The Social Club; The Timex Crew
- Origin: Berkeley, California, U.S.
- Genres: R&B, new jack swing
- Years active: 1985–1987, 2011–present
- Labels: Jay, Danya, Fantasy
- Spinoffs: Club Nouveau
- Members: Marcus Thompson (Founding Member/DJ); Samuelle Prater (vocals) Valerie Watson (vocals)
- Past members: Michael Marshall; Alex Hill; Kevin Moore; Greg Thomas (Timex Crew); Craig Samuel (Timex Crew); Darrien Cleage (Timex Crew)

Timex Social Club is an American R&B group, formed in 1983 and best known for the 1986 hit single "Rumors".

== History ==
Originally known as the Timex Crew, members included Marcus Thompson (founding member), Gregory "Greg B" Thomas, Michael Marshall, Craig Samuel and Darrien Cleage. By 1986, Samuel, Cleage,and Thomas had departed, Alex Hill and Kevin Moore were added and the name Timex Social Club was adopted. They fused funk, hip-hop, and urban R&B.

The group's major hit "Rumors" reached number one on Billboard's Hot Black Singles, Hot Dance/Disco Club Play and Hot Dance/Disco 12 Inch Singles Sales charts, peaked at number eight on the U.S. Billboard Hot 100 pop singles chart and number 13 on the UK singles chart.

=== Recording ===
Thompson, Hill and Marshall wrote the song "Rumors" in 1983. The lyrics Thompson wrote were inspired by student life at Berkeley High School. In late 1985, aspiring Sacramento-area producer and promoter Jay King heard the demo and arranged for Timex Social Club to record it at Starlight Studios in Richmond, California. "Rumors" was released as a seven and a twelve-inch single on King's fledgling Jay Records and distributed by Macola Records.

By May 1986, while "Rumors" was rising on the charts, the unsigned group recorded an album with Danya Records. The album Vicious Rumors was recorded at Fantasy Studios in Berkeley, California and distributed by Fantasy Records in the US (A&M in Canada; Mercury in Europe; CBS/Sony in Japan) and produced by Jay Logan. "Rumors" was re-recorded for the album and a music video was made to this new version. Two follow-up singles, "Thinkin' About Ya" and "Mixed-Up World", both reached number 15 on the Black Singles chart. As "Rumors" became popular outside of the US in the fall of 1986, it was this re-recorded version that charted in Canada and Europe.

The album debuted on Billboard's Black Albums chart on December 6, 1986 and peaked at number 29 on March 21,1987 but failed to chart on the Billboard 200 albums chart.

=== Touring ===
The success of the single "Rumors" prompted hip-hop impresario Russell Simmons to hire the group as the opening act for 38 dates on Run DMC's Raising Hell tour in 1986. Other acts on the tour were Beastie Boys, LL Cool J and Whodini. Besides solo dates, the group also opened for New Edition, Midnight Star, the S.O.S. Band, Kool & the Gang, Jermaine Jackson and Morris Day.

=== Split and Revival ===
Timex Social Club disbanded in 1987, shortly after the success of "Rumors". In 2011, founding member Marcus Thompson authored How Do Rumors Get Started: The True Story of Timex Social Club, his history of the group and his take on the rap music scene in the mid 1980s. As of 2025, the Timex Social Club roster consists of Thompson as DJ, and Samuelle and Val Watson on vocals.

== Discography ==
=== Studio albums ===
Year	Album	US R&B
1986	Vicious Rumors	29

=== Singles ===
Year	Title	Peak chart positions				
Year	Title	US 100	US R&B	US Dance	CAN	UK
1986	"Rumors"	8	1	1	1	13
1986	"Mixed Up World"	—	15	—	—	81
1986	"Thinkin' About Ya"	—	15	―	—	―
"—" denotes releases that did not chart or were not released in that territory.

== Awards and nominations ==
Year	Source	Song	Result	Misc.
1986	CRIA/Music Canada	"Rumors"	Gold single	Certification/Label A&M
1986	CRIA/Music Canada	"Rumors"	Platinum single	Certification/Label A&M
1986	Commendation	"Rumors" / Vicious Rumors	Awarded (key to city)	Mayor Richard L. Berkley Kansas City MO.
1986	Proclamation	"Rumors" / Vicious Rumors	Won	Governor John D. Ashcroft state of MO.
1986	The 1986 NARM Awards	"Rumors"	Won	Best Selling New Artist
1986	Bay Area Top Star Music Awards	"Rumors" / Vicious Rumors	Won	—
1987	American Music Awards	"Rumors" / Vicious Rumors	Nominated	—
1987	Bammies/Bay Area Music Awards	"Rumors" / Vicious Rumors	Nominated	—
1987	Juno Awards (CANADA)	"Rumors" / Vicious Rumors	Nominated	—
1987	Soul Train Music Awards	"Rumors" / Vicious Rumors	Nominated	—

== See also ==
- List of number-one hits (United States)
- List of number-one dance hits (United States)
- List of artists who reached number one on the U.S. Dance chart
- List of artists who reached number one on the US Dance chart
- List of artists who reached number one on the Hot 100 (U.S.)
- List of bands from the San Francisco Bay Area
