= Listen to the Message =

Studio album by Club Nouveau
- Released: May 24, 1988
- Recorded: 1987–1988
- Genre: Funk, soul
- Length: 41:31
- Label: Warner Bros. Records; 25687
- Producer: Jay King

Club Nouveau chronology
Life, Love & Pain (1986)	Listen to the Message (1988)	Under a Nouveau Groove (1989)

Professional ratings
Review scores
Source	Rating
The Encyclopedia of Popular Music	2/5 stars
Los Angeles Times	2/4 stars
Orlando Sentinel	2/5 stars
The Rolling Stone Album Guide	2.5/5 stars

Listen to the Message is the second studio album by the American contemporary R&B group Club Nouveau. It was released on May 24, 1988, on Warner Bros. Records. Listen to the Message contains darker lyrics dealing with social consciousness. Members Samuelle Prater and Thomas McElroy left the group before recording and were replaced with David Agent and Kevin Irving.

== Critical reception ==
The Globe and Mail called the album "an ambitious second LP that gets a D for originality, but an A - well, maybe a B+ - for execution." The Orlando Sentinel wrote that "'It's a Cold, Cold World!' -- with well-focused lyrics and a rock-steady beat -- kicks as hard as its opening percussive blast."

== Track listing ==
1. "It's a Cold, Cold World!" — 4:35
2. "Listen to the Message" — 5:05
3. "Dancin' to Be Free" — 4:35
4. "Why Is It That?" — 5:14
5. "For the Love of Francis" — 3:35
6. "Envious" — 4:29
7. "What's Going 'Round" — 4:23
8. "Only the Strong Survive" — 4:57
9. "Better Way" — 4:27

== Charts ==
Chart (1988)	Peak position
Billboard Top LPs	98
Billboard Top Black Albums	44
