= Lean on Me (song) =

1972 single by Bill Withers

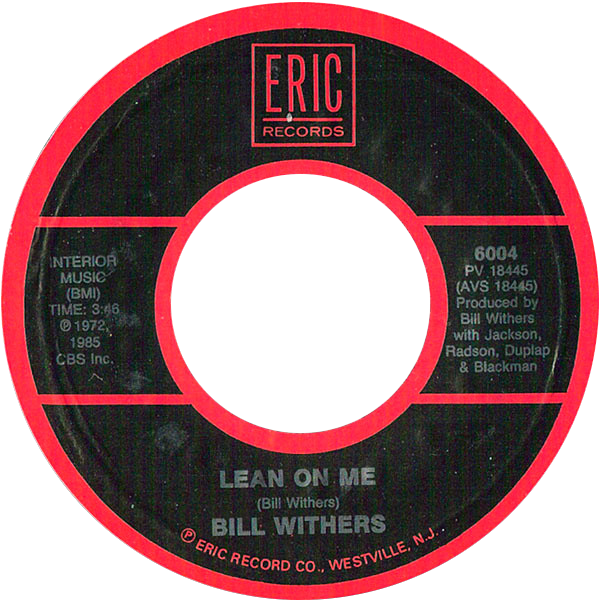
- Side A of the 1985 US Eric Records reissue

Single by Bill Withers

from the album Still Bill
- B-side: "Better Off Dead"
- Released: April 21, 1972
- Recorded: 1972
- Genre: Soul; gospel
- Length: 4:17 (album version); 3:45 (single version)
- Label: Sussex
- Songwriter: Bill Withers
- Producer: Bill Withers

Bill Withers singles chronology
"Grandma's Hands" (1971)	"Lean on Me" (1972)	"Use Me" (1972)

Audio video
- "Lean on Me" on YouTube

"Lean on Me" is a song written and recorded by American singer-songwriter Bill Withers. It was released in April 1972 as the lead single from his second album, Still Bill. The song was a No. 1 single on both the soul and Billboard Hot 100 charts, the latter chart for three weeks in July 1972. Billboard ranked it as the No. 7 song of 1972.

Numerous other versions have been recorded, and it is one of only nine songs to have reached No. 1 on the Billboard Hot 100 with versions recorded by two different artists with a 1987 cover by Club Nouveau also reaching No. 1. In 2007, the 1972 recording of the song by Bill Withers on Sussex Records was inducted into the Grammy Hall of Fame. It was ranked No. 208 on Rolling Stone's list of "The 500 Greatest Songs of All Time" in 2010.

== Background and writing ==
Bill Withers' childhood in the coal mining town of Slab Fork, West Virginia, was the inspiration for "Lean on Me", which he wrote for his album Still Bill after he moved to Los Angeles, and found himself missing the strong community ethic of his hometown. Withers had lived in a decrepit house in the poor section of his town.

Withers recalled to Songfacts the original inspiration for the song:

"I bought a little piano and I was sitting there just running my fingers up and down the piano. In the course of doing the music, that phrase crossed my mind, so then you go back and say, 'OK, I like the way that phrase, Lean On Me, sounds with this song.'"

Withers stated in the same interview that he made an effort to keep the lyrics simple.

Several members of the Watts 103rd Street Rhythm Band were used for the recording session in 1972. A string section was also included.

== Personnel ==
- Bill Withers – Piano, vocals
- Benorce Blackmon – Guitar
- Raymond Jackson – Wurlitzer electric piano, string arrangement
- Melvin Dunlap – Bass
- James Gadson – Drums

== Track listings ==
7-inch single

1. "Lean on Me" – 3:45
2. "Better Off Dead" – 2:13

== Charts ==
=== Weekly charts ===
1972 weekly chart performance for "Lean on Me"
Chart (1972)	Peak position
Australia (Kent Music Report)	24
Canada Top Singles (RPM)	20
UK Singles (Official Charts)	18
US Billboard Hot 100	1
US Best-Selling Soul Singles (Billboard)	1
US Easy Listening (Billboard)	4
US Cash Box Top 100	1

2020 weekly chart performance for "Lean on Me"
Chart (2020)	Peak position
Switzerland (Schweizer Hitparade)	84

2026 weekly chart performance for "Lean on Me"
Chart (2026)	Peak position
Israel International Airplay (Media Forest)	8

=== Year-end charts ===
Year-end chart performance for "Lean on Me"
Chart (1972)	Rank
US Billboard Hot 100	7
US Cash Box	14

== Certifications ==
Certifications for "Lean on Me"
Region	Certification	Certified units/sales
Australia (ARIA)	Platinum	70,000^{‡}
United Kingdom (BPI)	Platinum	600,000^{‡}
United States (RIAA)	Gold	2,000,000
^{‡} Sales+streaming figures based on certification alone.

== Club Nouveau version ==
"Lean on Me"

Single by Club Nouveau

from the album Life, Love & Pain
- B-side: "Pump It Up (Reprise)"
- Released: February 14, 1987
- Genre: R&B; soul; funk; go-go; new jack swing
- Length: 6:01 (LP version); 3:58 (radio edit)
- Label: Warner Bros.
- Songwriter: Bill Withers
- Producer: Jay King

Club Nouveau singles chronology
"Situation #9" (1986)	"Lean on Me" (1987)	"Why You Treat Me So Bad" (1987)

Music video
- "Lean on Me" on YouTube

The R&B group Club Nouveau covered the song with a go-go beat for their album Life, Love & Pain and reached No. 1 on the Billboard Hot 100 chart in March 1987. It also reached No. 1 on the Billboard Dance/Disco Club Play and 12-inch Singles Sales charts, as well as No. 2 on the Billboard Hot Black Singles chart. The song won a Grammy Award in 1987 for Bill Withers, as the writer, for Best R&B Song at the 30th Annual Grammy Awards. It was ranked at No. 94 on VH1's 100 Greatest One-Hit Wonders of the 80s.

=== Track listings ===
7-inch single

1. "Lean on Me" – 3:58
2. "Pump It Up (Lean on Me)" (reprise) – 2:38

12-inch single

1. "Lean on Me" (remix)" – 7:42
2. "Lean on Me" (LP version) – 5:56
3. "Pump It Up (Lean on Me)" (remix) – 4:51
4. "Pump It Up (Lean on Me)" (reprise – LP version) – 2:38

=== Charts ===
==== Weekly charts ====
Weekly chart performance for Club Nouveau's cover
Chart (1987)	Peak position
Australia (Kent Music Report)	5
Austria (Ö3 Austria Top 40)	22
Belgium (Ultratop 50 Flanders)	12
Canada Retail Singles (The Record)	1
Canada Top Singles (RPM)	1
Europe (European Hot 100 Singles)	6
Ireland (IRMA)	5
Italy Airplay (Music & Media)	11
Netherlands (Dutch Top 40)	5
Netherlands (Single Top 100)	4
New Zealand (Recorded Music NZ)	1
South Africa (Springbok Radio)	2
Switzerland (Schweizer Hitparade)	7
UK Singles (Official Charts)	3
US Billboard Hot 100	1
US Adult Contemporary (Billboard)	31
US Dance Club Songs (Billboard) Remix	1
US Dance Singles Sales (Billboard) Remix	1
US Hot Black Singles (Billboard)	2
West Germany (GfK)	9

==== Year-end charts ====
Year-end chart performance for Club Nouveau's cover
Chart (1987)	Position
Australia (Kent Music Report)	27
Canada Top Singles (RPM)	4
Europe (European Hot 100 Singles)	55
Netherlands (Dutch Top 40)	7
Netherlands (Single Top 100)	18
New Zealand (RIANZ)	3
UK Singles (OCC)	41
US Billboard Hot 100	29
US 12-inch Singles Sales (Billboard)	15
US Crossover Singles (Billboard)	6
US Dance Club Play (Billboard)	36
US Hot Black Singles (Billboard)	39
West Germany (Media Control)	61

=== Certifications ===
Certifications and sales for Club Nouveau's cover
Region	Certification	Certified units/sales
United Kingdom (BPI)	Silver	250,000^{^}
United States (RIAA)	Gold	1,000,000^{^}
^{^} Shipments figures based on certification alone.^{‡} Sales+streaming figures based on certification alone.

== 2-4 Family version ==
"Lean on Me (With the Family)"

Single by 2-4 Family

from the album Family Business
- Released: January 30, 1999
- Length: 3:38 (radio version)
- Label: Epic
- Songwriter: Bill Withers
- Producers: Alex Trime; Sven "Delgado" Jordan

2-4 Family singles chronology
"Stay" (1998)	"Lean on Me (With the Family)" (1999)	"Take Me Home" (1999)

Audio video
- "Lean on Me (With the Family)" on YouTube

In 1999, 2-4 Family released "Lean on Me (With the Family)", a remake with a hip hop arrangement and additional lyrics, from their album Family Business. Epic Records published a 12-inch single and a CD maxi single in Germany.

In 2008, several years after the dissolution of 2-4 Family, founding band-member Mike Johnson performed the song with backing vocalists and dancers at the Eurovision Song Contest in Bulgaria.

=== Track listings ===
12-inch single

1. "Lean on Me (With the Family)" (special radio version) – 3:58
2. "Lean on Me (With the Family)" (DSP mix) – 4:04
3. "9 Lives" (album version) – 4:06
4. "Stay" (special radio version) – 4:12
5. "Lean on Me (With the Family)" (lounge mix) – 6:38
6. "Stay" (Jay's D-Style mix) – 4:15

CD maxi single

1. "Lean on Me (With the Family)" (radio version) – 3:38
2. "Lean on Me (With the Family)" (DSP mix) – 4:04
3. "Lean on Me (With the Family)" (lounge mix) – 6:38
4. "Lean on Me (With the Family)" (special radio version) – 3:58
5. "Stay" (Jay's D-Style mix) – 4:15
6. "9 Lives" (album version) – 4:06

=== Charts ===
==== Weekly charts ====
Weekly chart performance for 2-4 Family's cover
Chart (1999)	Peak position
Austria (Ö3 Austria Top 40)	6
Germany (GfK)	9
Switzerland (Schweizer Hitparade)	7

==== Year-end charts ====
Year-end chart performance for 2-4 Family's cover
Chart (1999)	Position
Germany (Media Control)	82

== In popular culture ==
- The song is used in the ending scene of the 1995 season 7 episode of The Simpsons titled "Radioactive Man".
- Mary J. Blige performed this song on the HBO special We Are One: The Obama Inaugural Celebration at the Lincoln Memorial (January 18, 2009). The next day, a crowd spontaneously began singing the song in the Purple Tunnel of Doom under the National Mall as they waited to gain entrance to the inauguration ceremonies for President Barack Obama.
- On October 3, 2015, Hillary Clinton, during her presidential campaign, made a cameo appearance on Saturday Night Live in a comedy sketch alongside Kate McKinnon, who regularly parodied Clinton for the show. At the end of the sketch, the duo sang "Lean on Me" together.

== Notable cover versions ==
In 1989, remakes of "Lean on Me" by the Winans and Sandra Reaves-Phillips provided the emotional uplift for the film Lean on Me. For the same film, the song was adapted by Big Daddy Kane in "hip hop" form.

In 1976, English glam rock band Mud released their version which was a top 10 hit on both the UK singles chart and Irish singles chart, peaking at No. 7 and No. 6, respectively.

For the BBC's Children in Need in 2016, 1,580 children in choirs sang the song in unison, live from nine towns across the UK. The choirs started singing at the same time and on the telethon; starting in the studio it cut between the choirs giving them either one 20 second slot, or two 10 second slots on air before finishing in the studio. The choirs sang from Elstree at Elstree Studios (the studio just outside London where the main telethon was held), Liverpool at Sefton Park, Swansea from The Swansea University Bay Campus, Bridlington at Bridlington Spa, Dudley at the Black Country Living Museum, Glasgow at BBC Pacific Quay, Milton Keynes at Stadium MK, Salisbury at Salisbury Arts Centre and Belfast at Titanic.

In 2020, the song was recorded by an ad hoc supergroup of Canadian musicians credited as ArtistsCAN, both in tribute to Withers' recent death and to raise funds for the Canadian Red Cross during the COVID-19 pandemic. Participating artists included Bryan Adams, Jann Arden, Justin Bieber, Michael Bublé, Fefe Dobson, Scott Helman, Shawn Hook, Avril Lavigne, Geddy Lee, Marie-Mai, Sarah McLachlan, Johnny Orlando, Josh Ramsay, Buffy Sainte-Marie, Tyler Shaw, Walk Off the Earth, Donovan Woods, and Olivia Lunny.

In 2023, Japanese-American singer Ai performed the song live at the Hiroshima Peace Memorial Park during the 49th G7 summit. Ai additionally covered "Lean on Me" during a surprise appearance at the G7's youth symposium that took place later the same day. Her cover of "Lean on Me" later was included on her thirteenth studio album, Respect All.
