= Eloy de Jong =

Dutch pop singer and moderator

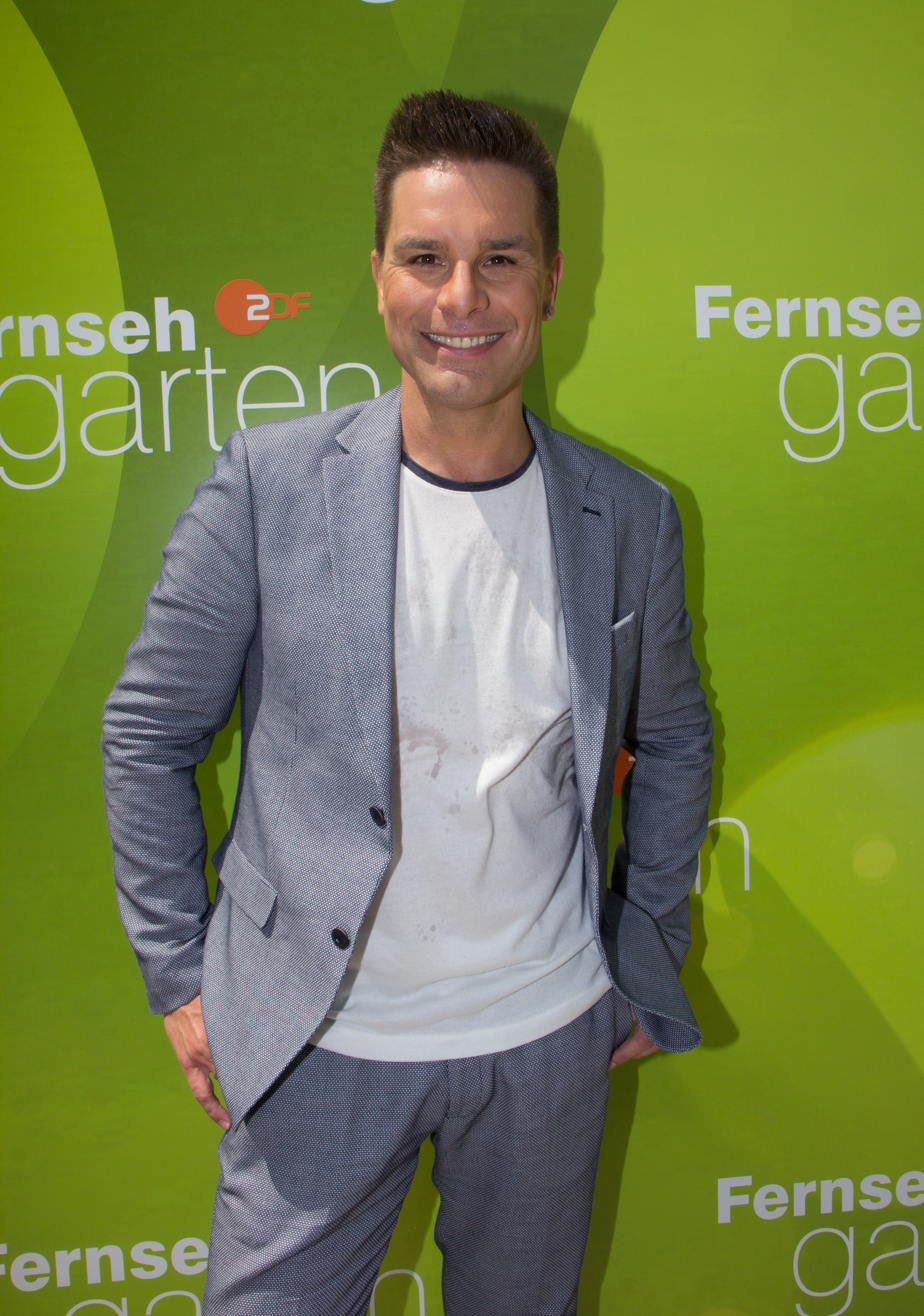
- Jong at ZDF-Fernsehgarten in 2018
- Born: Eloy Francois Maurice Gilbert Charles Prosper de Jong; 13 March 1973 (age 53); The Hague, Netherlands
- Occupations: Pop singer; Moderator
- Partner: Yes
- Children: 2 (Note: One child is deceased.)
- Awards: See Awards

Eloy Francois Maurice Gilbert Charles Prosper de Jong (born March 13, 1973) is a Dutch pop singer and moderator. He became known in the early 1990s as a member of the English-Dutch boy group Caught in the Act. In 2004, he made a comeback as a solo singer. In 2018, he reached number 1 on the German album charts with his German-language albums.

== Life ==
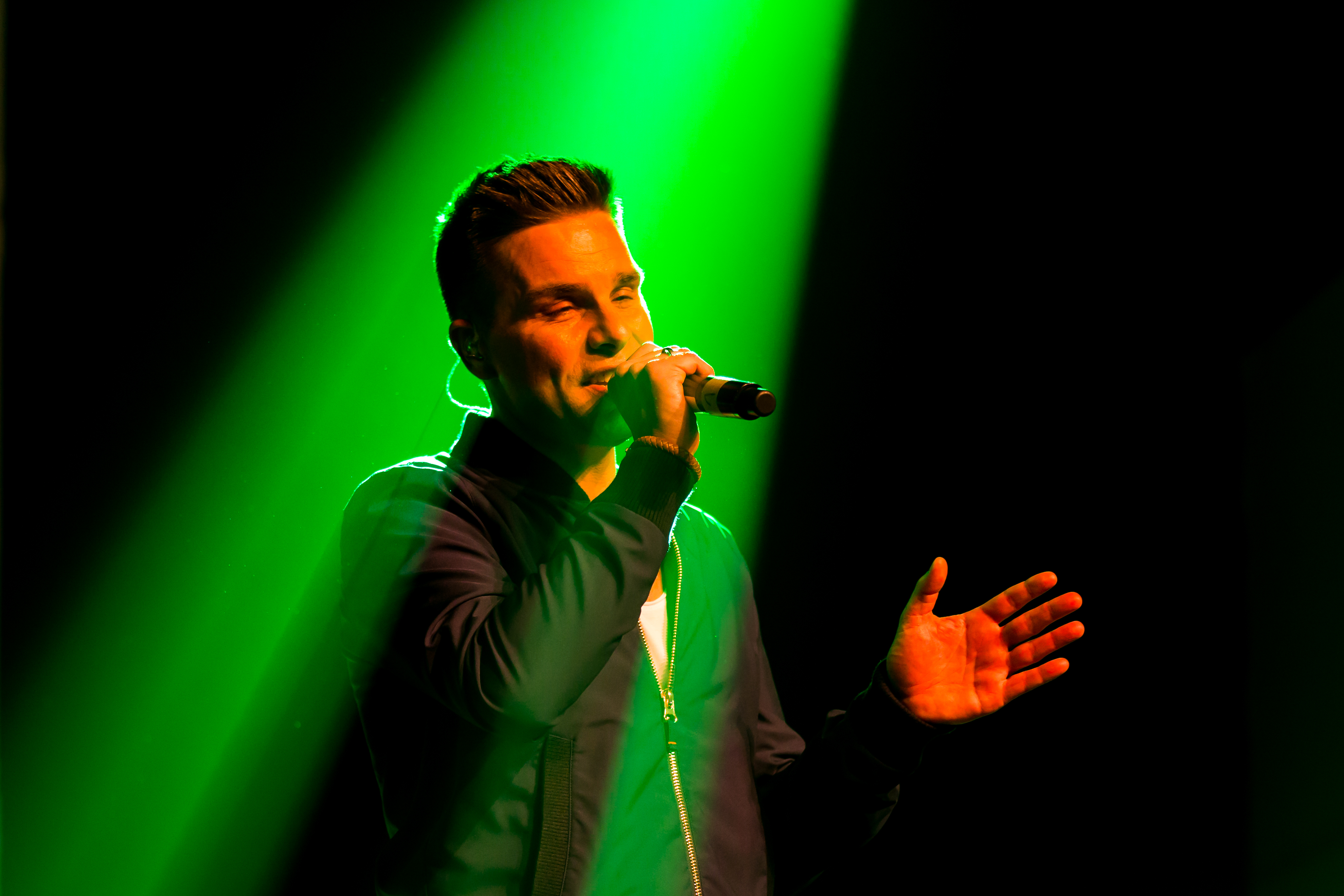
Eloy de Jong in 2015

Eloy Francois Maurice Gilbert Charles Prosper de Jong was born on March 13, 1973, in The Hague, Netherlands.

As a teenager, Eloy de Jong was the Dutch youth champion in Latin American dance. In 1993, producer Cees van Leeuwen was searching for four young men to create a boy band called Caught in the Act. De Jong was chosen as one of the four members. After their initial failures, the band made a breakthrough in the Netherlands and Germany after performing in the RTL soap opera Gute Zeiten, Schlechte Zeiten in November 1994. Their success was mostly focused on Germany, and by 1998 the band had placed three albums in the German top ten and sold more than 20 million records. After a farewell concert on August 16, 1998, in Magdeburg, the band split up.

In the summer of 1999, de Jong came back into the public eye when he and his partner, Irish singer Stephen Gately from the band Boyzone, became the first members of boy bands to come out as gay. In 2002, the two separated. After that, De Jong had a relationship with the moderator Carlo Boszhard for a while.

In 2004, he started his career as a solo singer and landed a minor hit in Germany with the single Angel In Disguise.This was followed by several other hit songs, like Regenbogen (Rainbows) (2017), Egal was andere sagen (No matter what others say) (2018), and Liebe kann so weh tun (Love can hurt) (2018) a duet with Marianne Rosenberg. In 2021 had scored a big hit with "Bist du's Oder Bist du's Nicht (Are you or are you not?), a duet with Beatrice Egli. His 2018 album Kopf aus - Herz an (Head up, Heart on) went to number 1 in the German charts. While his follow up album in 2020 Auf das Leben-Fertig-Los! (It's about life-Ready-Go!) reached number 2. His next album, Lass Das Leben Musik Sein made it to number 6 in the German charts.

De Jong started a family a few years ago, and he and his partner became fathers of a daughter and a son. Unfortunately, the son died at birth. The girl was raised by the two fathers and her mother, according to the model of coparenting.

== Discography ==
=== Albums ===
- 2018: Kopf aus – Herz an
- 2020: Auf das Leben – fertig – los!
- 2022: Lass Das Leben Musik Sein

Singles

- 2004: Angel in Disguise
- 2017: Regenbogen
- 2018: Egal was andere sagen
- 2018: Schritt für Schritt
- 2018: Liebe kann so weh tun (with Marianne Rosenberg)
- 2018: An deiner Seite
- 2019: Kopf aus, Herz an ... und tanz! Samba
- 2019: Dieses Lied (Herzstück Amazon Original)
- 2020: Solange wir uns haben
- 2020: Barfuß im Regen
- 2022: Ich sage ja (You Raise Me Up)

== Awards ==
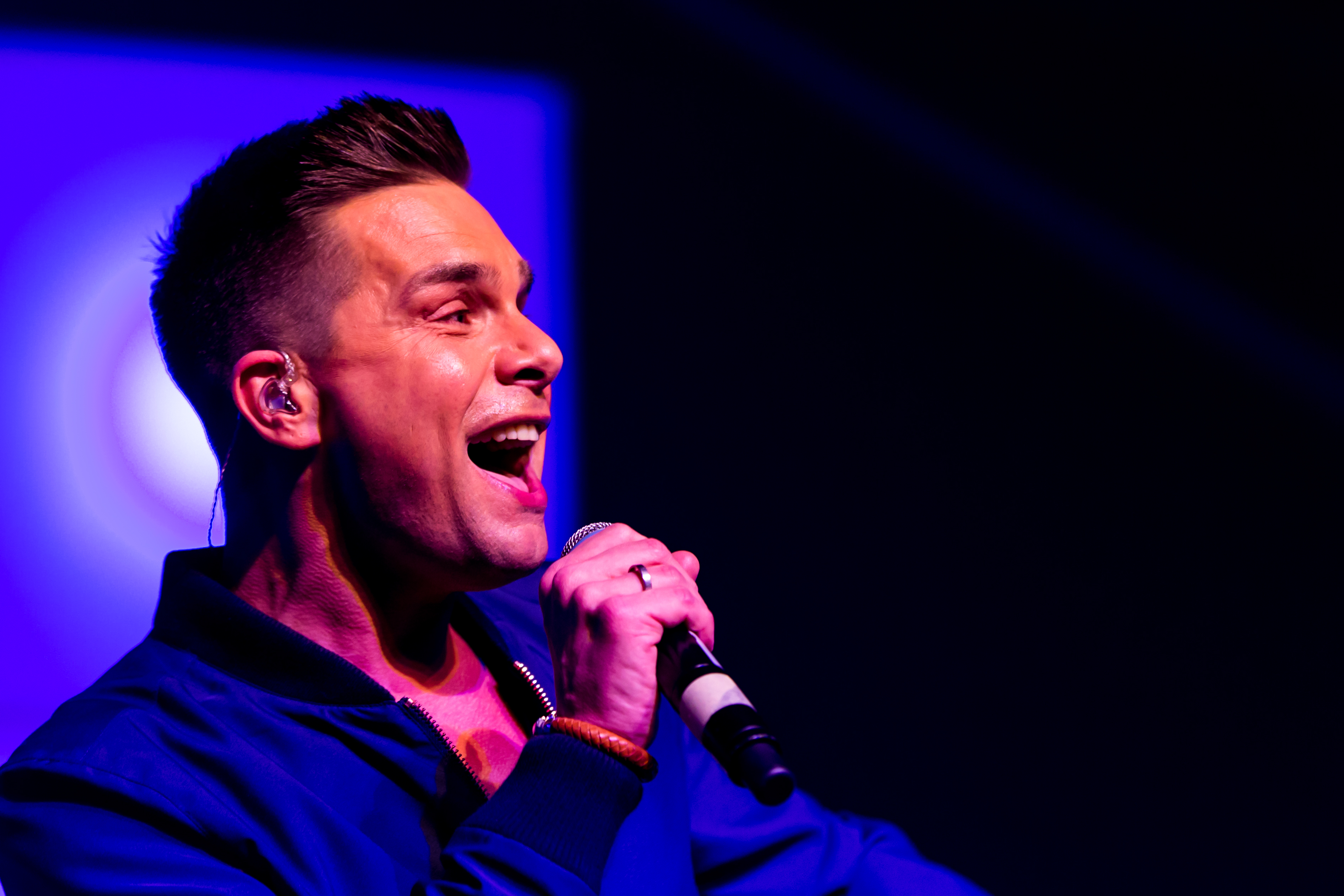
Eloy de Jong in 2015

=== 2019 ===
- Die Eins der Besten, category: „Newcomer des Jahres“ ("Newcomer of the year")
- smago! Award, category: „Senkrechtstarter des Jahres“ ("Whiz of the year")
