= My Arms Keep Missing You =

Single by Rick Astley
- A-side: "When I Fall in Love"
- Released: 30 November 1987
- Genre: Pop
- Length: 3:14
- Label: RCA
- Songwriters: Mike Stock; Matt Aitken; Pete Waterman
- Producer: Stock Aitken Waterman

Rick Astley singles chronology
"Whenever You Need Somebody" (1987)	"When I Fall in Love" / "My Arms Keep Missing You" (1987)	"Together Forever" (1988)

Official audio
- "My Arms Keep Missing You" on YouTube

"My Arms Keep Missing You" is a song by Rick Astley released in 1987 as the second half of a double A-side single. The first A-side is a cover of the pop standard "When I Fall in Love". "My Arms Keep Missing You" was released as an independent single in Germany and reached number 6. The song's first appearance on an album was the 2002 compilation Greatest Hits, and it later appeared on the 2010 expanded version of Hold Me in Your Arms as a bonus track. The song also appeared on the remastered edition of Whenever You Need Somebody, which was released on 20 May 2022. In addition, a digital EP was released on 13 April 2022, including the single and its remixes. The song was also included on a limited edition 12" double A-side red vinyl issue of the "Love This Christmas" single, along with "When I Fall in Love".

== Critical reception ==
In a review published in Smash Hits, Lola Borg considered "My Arms Keep Missing You" as "truly splendid", adding that Astley "gears himself into shuffly dance mode and sounds exactly like himself".

== Track listing ==
- 12" vinyl promo RCA RICK 1000 DJ
1. "My Arms Keep Missing You"
2. "My Arms Keep Missing You" (dub)
- 12" vinyl RCA PT 41684 R
1. "My Arms Keep Missing You" (Bruno's mix) – 6:11
2. "My Arms Keep Missing You" – 6:45
3. "When I Fall in Love" – 2:59 (Heyman/Young)
- Digital EP
1. "My Arms Keep Missing You" – 3:14
2. "My Arms Keep Missing You" (The "Where's Harry?" remix) – 3:15
3. "My Arms Keep Missing You" (Bruno's remix) – 6:17
4. "My Arms Keep Missing You" (No L mix) – 6:46

== Charts ==
=== Weekly charts ===
Weekly chart performance for "My Arms Keep Missing You"
Chart (1988)	Peak position
Denmark (IFPI)	11
Italy (Musica e dischi)	20
South Africa (Springbok Radio)	4
Spain (AFYVE)	7 (Note: The exact peak position in Spain is unknown. The single reached at least number 7, as Music & Media provided the single's ranking only for that week, but it did not reach the top three, given every week by the magazine.)
UK Dance (Music Week)	10
West Germany (GfK) "When I Fall in Love" / "My Arms Keep Missing You"	6

== Cover versions ==
In 1995, British-Dutch boyband Caught in the Act covered "My Arms Keep Missing You" and released it as the second single from their debut album, Caught in the Act of Love, which peaked at number 26 in Germany and 42 in Switzerland. In 2006, Danzel Vs. DJ F.R.A.N.K. released their own version of the song as a 12" maxi single, which charted for ten weeks on the Ultratop Belgian (Flanders) Chart and peaked at number 15.
