= Michael Marshall (singer) =

American singer

- Also known as: Mike Marshall, Mike Meezy
- Born: Michael Marshall
- Origin: Berkeley, California, U.S.
- Genres: R&B
- Occupations: Singer, songwriter, producer
- Years active: 1986–present
- Label: Jakilrecords
- Website: michaelmarshallusa.com

Michael Marshall, also known and credited as Mike Marshall and Mike Meezy, is an American singer and songwriter and the former lead singer of American R&B group Timex Social Club. As a solo artist, his singing voice is featured on the chorus of the Luniz certified platinum international hit song "I Got 5 On It". He is also heard on the international top 10 dance hit "Your Body", with DJ Tom Novy, and he sings “San Francisco” in the film The Last Black Man in San Francisco. Marshall still tours, and has completed his third solo R&B album, Grown & Sexy.

== Discography ==
=== Studio albums ===
- Love, Lies, And Life (2005)
- Soul Of The Bay (2008)
- In The Mean Time & In Between Time (2010)
- Right Where I'm ‘Posed 2 Be (2013)
- Grown & Sexy (2018)

=== Collaboration albums ===
- Vicious Rumors with Timex Social Club (1986)
- K.I.M. with Equipto (2004)
- K.I.M. II: Keep It Movin' 2 Love Changes with Equipto (2011)
- K.I.M. 2.5: Forever Unfinished with Equipto (2017)
- K.I.M. 3: Sigue La Movida with Equipto (2019)
- Rhythm & Blues with Chris Christopher (2024)

=== Extended plays ===
- Simply Meezy (2013)
- Green Room (2016)
