= Life, Love & Pain =

Studio album by Club Nouveau
- Released: November 17, 1986
- Recorded: 1986
- Studios: Moon Studio, Sacramento, California
- Genre: R&B
- Length: 37:49
- Labels: Warner Bros. 25531
- Producers: Jay King; Denzil Foster; Thomas McElroy

Club Nouveau chronology
Life, Love & Pain (1986)	Listen to the Message (1988)

Singles from Life, Love & Pain
- 1. "Jealousy" Released: September 19, 1986; 2. "Situation #9 / Pump it Up (Lean On Me) Reprise" Released: December 03, 1986; 3. "Lean on Me / Pump It Up (Lean on Me) Reprise" Released: February 14, 1987; 4. "Why You Treat Me So Bad" Released: May 20, 1987; 5. "Let Me Go / Promises Promises" Released: August 03, 1987; 6. "Heavy on My Mind" Released: September 18, 1987

Professional ratings
Review scores
Source	Rating
AllMusic	4.5/5 stars
Robert Christgau	B−

Life, Love & Pain is the debut album by R&B group Club Nouveau. It was released in late 1986 with production by Denzil Foster, Thomas McElroy and Jay King. The album reached number one on the Billboard Top Soul Albums chart and number six on the Billboard Pop Albums chart. Led by the hit single, a cover of the Bill Withers classic "Lean on Me", which went to number one on both Hot 100 and Dance charts and number two on the R&B chart, this was the only album that Denzil Foster and Thomas McElroy would contribute to, as the duo left the group to form its own production team and focus on working with other acts, notably En Vogue and Tony! Toni! Toné!. Twelve-inch singles from the album were handled by then-WB subsidiary Tommy Boy Records.

== Track listing ==
1. "Jealousy" (Alex Hill, Denzil Foster, Jay King, Marcus Thompson, Michael Marshall, Thomas McElroy) — 4:46
2. "Why You Treat Me So Bad" (Denzil Foster, Jay King, Thomas McElroy) — 5:07
3. "Lean on Me" (Bill Withers) — 5:56
4. "Promises, Promises" (Denzil Foster, Jay King, Thomas McElroy) — 5:25
5. "Situation #9" (Denzil Foster, Jay King, Thomas McElroy) — 4:51
6. "Heavy on My Mind" (Denzil Foster, Jay King, Thomas McElroy) — 4:43
7. "Let Me Go" (Denzil Foster, Jay King, Thomas McElroy) — 4:23
8. "Lean on Me (Pump It Up) Reprise" (Denzil Foster, Jay King, Thomas McElroy) — 2:17

== Personnel ==
- Valerie Watson, Samuelle Prater: Lead and backing vocals
- Jay King, Denzil Foster, Thomas McElroy: Keyboards, drum programming, backing vocals

== Charts ==
Chart (1986–1987)	Peak position
Billboard Top LPs	6
Billboard Top Black Albums	2

=== Singles ===
Year	Single	Chart positions		
Year	Single	US Hot 100	US R&B	US Dance
1986	"Jealousy"	-	8	38
1986	"Situation #9"	-	4	-
1987	"Lean on Me"	1	2	1
1987	"Why You Treat Me So Bad"	39	2	22
1987	"Heavy on My Mind"	-	42	-

== Samples ==
- Luniz sampled "Why You Treat Me So Bad" on its song "I Got 5 on It", which appeared on the album Operation Stackola in 1995.
- Puff Daddy sampled "Why You Treat Me So Bad" on his song "Satisfy You" featuring R. Kelly, which appeared on his album Forever in 1999.
- Jennifer Lopez sampled "Why You Treat Me So Bad" on her song "I'm Gonna Be All Right" featuring Nas, which appeared on her album J to tha L–O!: The Remixes in 2002.
- Ashanti sampled "Why You Treat Me So Bad" on her song "Only U", which appeared on her album Concrete Rose in 2004.
