= Lee Baxter (singer) =

British actor of stage and screen

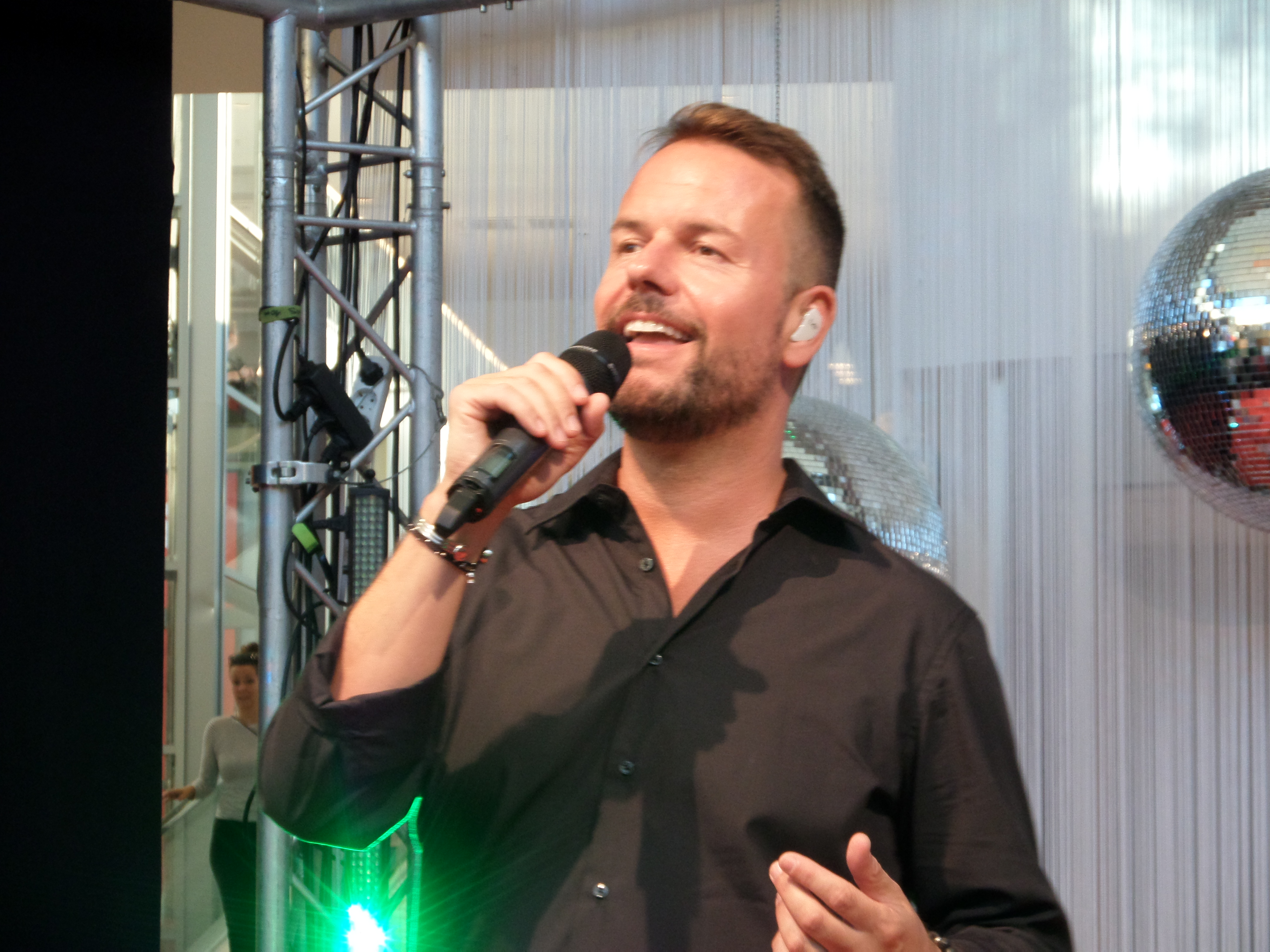
- Lee Collin Baxter in 2018.
- Born: 16 July 1970 (age 55); Liverpool, England
- Occupation: Actor
- Years active: 1992 – present
- Website: https://web.archive.org/web/20070314010359/http://www.collinbaxter.net/

Lee Collin Baxter (born 16 July 1970) is a British actor of stage and screen. He was a graduate from Guildford School of Acting where he won Student of the Year and the annual Choreography Award.

He gained initial success with the half English, half Dutch boy band, Caught In The Act. With fifteen hit singles and selling over 15 million singles and albums, the band went on to win 15 gold and 2 platinum records.

Highlights of his career with the band including performing on Miss World 1995 in Sun City, South Africa, televised to over 90 countries.

After Caught In The Act disbanded, Lee returned to the UK to pursue an acting career under the name of Collin Baxter.

In 2016, Baxter came out as gay.

== Selected stage and screen credits ==
=== Theatre ===
- Committed Exhibitionist, Gilded Balloon, Edinburgh Festival; The Landor, Broadway Theatre; The Red Lion, London, 2003
- Men's Singles, The English Theatre, Hamburg, 2005
- Bully's Paradise, UK Tour, 2006
- Visiting Mr. Green, The English Theatre, Hamburg, 2007
- She Stoops to Conquer, Incisor Theatre Co., 2008
- Six Dance Lessons in Six Weeks, The English Theatre, Hamburg, 2009

=== Filmography ===
Year	Film	Role	Other notes
1994-95	Gute Zeiten, schlechte Zeiten (TV)	Himself	
2005	Overtime	Tim	
2006	Bathroom Story	Shawn Wellington	
2006	Profile of Fear	Andrew Hanna	
2007	A Writer's Tale	The Writer	
2008	Torchwood (TV)	Policeman	
2009	Shut	Malcolm Bricks/James	
