= Eric van Tijn =

Dutch music producer

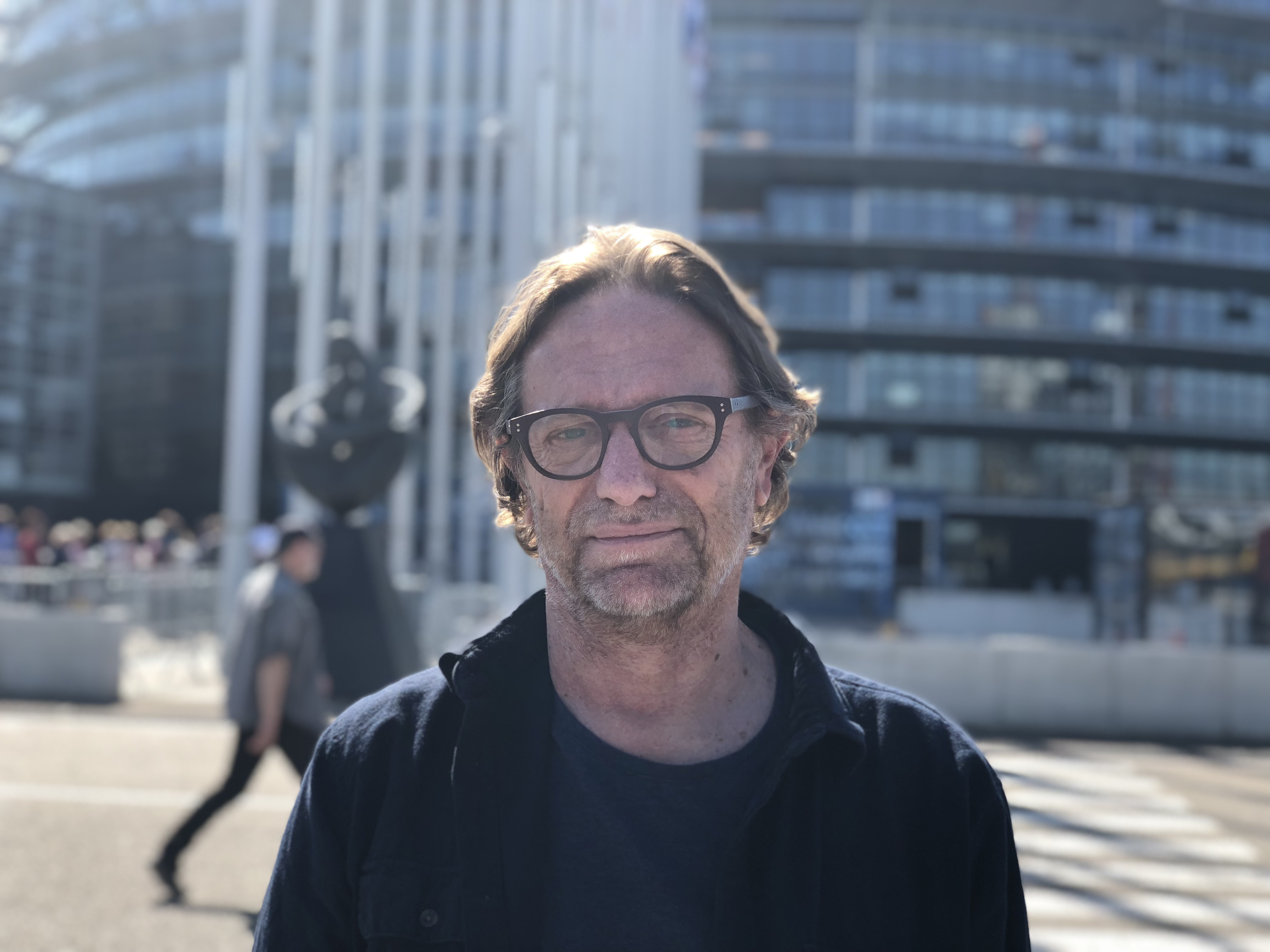

Eric Job van Tijn (born 2 November 1956, in Amsterdam) is a Dutch music producer and judge on the Dutch versions of the music competitions Idols and X Factor.

He comes from a musical family. His parents Eli and Lena van Tijn founded Artisound the year he was born and he grew up around the studio. In his youth, and during school years, he played in various bands. He also studied composition, arrangement and playing the piano in the conservatory.

His initial musical work was producing Patricia Paay. Soon after, he arranged and produced for the Dutch television show De Familie Knots, which resulted in an album also produced by him. It was also the beginning of a long-running cooperation with Jochem Fluitsma. The two became known as Fluitsma & Van Tijn, they went on to produce many hits interpreted by The Scene, Guus Meeuwiss & Vagant, Loïs Lane, De Kast, Willeke Alberti, the Dolly Dots and Mathilde Santing. Other credits include Mai Tai, Henk Westbroek, Caught in the Act, Jazzpolitie, the trio Linda, Roos & Jessica, the band 4 Fun, Hind Laroussi and Status Quo. Their biggest hit came through a promotional song 15 Miljoen Mensen (meaning 15 million people) for the Dutch bank Postbank N.V.

He is also known for co-writing "Vrede" with Jochem Fluitsma, a song performed by Ruth Jacott, who represented the Netherlands in 1993 Eurovision Song Contest, coming 6th overall. Van Tijn and Fluitsma also wrote the song "Hemel en aarde" for Edsilia Rombley which represented the Netherlands in 1998 Eurovision Song Contest, coming 4th overall. With Fluitsama he also co-wrote "History" by Mai Tai. He also composed for the television shows Tarzan and Op zoek naar Evita (meaning Looking for Evita).

He also worked as a judge for the Dutch musical competition shows Idols and X Factor with his band participating in the live TV finals of the X Factor.

He composed the original score for the Eurovision Song Contest 2021.
