= Jochem Fluitsma =

Dutch music producer and musician

Jochem Fluitsma (Dutch pronunciation: [ˈjɔxəɱ ˈflœytsmaː]; born 1 June 1958 in Amsterdam, Netherlands), is a Dutch music producer and musician. With Eric van Tijn, he is also part of the musical writing duo Fluitsma & Van Tijn. He has written songs for The Scene, Guus Meeuwis & Vagant, Loïs Lane, De Kast, Willeke Alberti, the Dolly Dots and Mathilde Santing and Status Quo.

He wrote the song "Vrede" with Eric van Tijn for Ruth Jacott, who represented the Netherlands in 1993 Eurovision Song Contest coming 6th overall. Van Tijn also co-wrote with Fluitsma the song "Hemel en aarde for "Edsilia Rombley who represented the Netherlands coming 4th overall.

He also took part in Idols as a musician. He won the Golden Harp Dutch music award in 1997, concurrently with Eric van Tijn.
