= ZYX Music =

German record label

- Founded: 1971; 55 years ago
- Founder: Bernhard Mikulski
- Country of origin: Germany
- Official website: zyx.de

ZYX Music GmbH & Co. KG is a German record label founded in 1971 by Bernhard Mikulski. It is one of the most successful German record labels of the 1980s and 1990s. Until 1992, the label was known as Pop-Import Bernhard Mikulski. The label specialized in disco, early house music, and 1990s techno. Founder Bernhard Mikulski is credited with coining the term "Italo disco" in the 1980s. After Bernhard's death, his wife Christa Mikulski took over in 1997.

ZYX Music is headquartered in Merenberg, Germany, and has offices in the US and several European countries. ZYX releases records across a variety of genres, including techno, hip hop, funk, rock, and pop. Notably, ZYX currently holds many rights from some German Krautrock labels, such as Ohr, Pilz, and Kosmische Kuriere, and is also responsible for reissuing many albums from the free jazz/avant-garde label ESP-Disk. Previously, it held the manufacturing license for Fantasy Records in Europe, an arrangement that ceased at the end of 2005.

Under the imprint ZYX Classic, ZYX has reissued significant recordings of classical music, including a Beethoven edition. Golden Core is a successful heavy metal label.

== See also ==
- List of record labels
