= Verzuz =

Webcast series

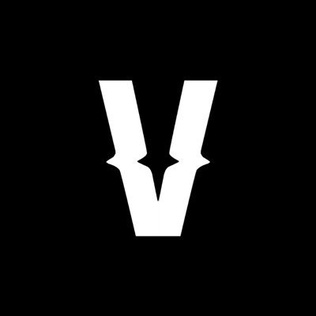
- Created by: Timbaland and Swizz Beatz
- Presented by: Timbaland; Swizz Beatz
- No. of seasons: 3
- No. of episodes: 46 (with 5 specials)

Original release
- Network: Instagram Live, Apple Music, Triller, Fite TV (video stream), Tidal (music audio recap), Twitter
- Release: March 24, 2020 – present

Verzuz ("Versus", often stylized in all caps) is an American webcast series created by record producers Timbaland and Swizz Beatz. It was introduced during the 2020 COVID-19 pandemic as a virtual DJ battle, with Timbaland and Swizz Beatz facing off in its first iteration through an Instagram Live broadcast in March 2020.

The series invites two musicians, predominantly R&B and hip hop, such as Mario and Omarion, to highlight their discographies in two 10-song rounds during a three-hour session.

Episodes have included battles between producers Teddy Riley/Babyface, singers Erykah Badu/Jill Scott, Brandy/Monica, Gladys Knight/Patti LaBelle, and rappers Ludacris/Nelly, as well as Jeezy/Gucci Mane.

The web series won the NAACP Image Award for Outstanding Variety Series in 2021.

Verzuz returned for its third season to streaming and the live audience in October 2025, after 3 years of hiatus since 2022.

“Verzuz” is a sensational spelling of the word “versus.”

== Beginning of Verzuz ==
Verzuz began as an impromptu broadcast before taking on the form of a brand, adopting a logo and official social media accounts with subsequent matches. The Verzuz brand gained its official trademark in April 2020, as registered by Timbaland. In August 2020, after a bidding war, the series began a partnership with streaming service Apple Music and social media platform Twitter, integrating Apple's audiovisual capabilities with Twitter's social-engagement aspect, a first for the former.

The idea of creating a live battle was conceived by Timbaland and Swizz Beatz in 2017, which led to a 'producer clash' battle during a Hot 97 Summer Jam concert in 2018. The live show consists of two challengers in the entertainment industry who compete with their best hit record. There are no actual winners chosen. In an ABC News interview, Swizz Beatz stated "The people won, the culture won, music won" in reference to the music sales and online streams gradually increasing due to both newfound interest and curiosity. Though no winners are selected, Billboard magazine has released scorecards and breakdowns of the battles and selected winners based on these observations.

The Verzuz webcast became an online streaming show during the COVID-19 pandemic.

The first three Verzuz matches surpassed a million views, The Ashanti vs Keyshia Cole Verzuz was the most watched webcast with over 6 million total Instagram viewers, breaking the Jeezy vs Gucci Mane record which held over 5 million in total viewers and Brandy vs Monica record, which was the first live stream webcast to pass the million mark with over 1.2 million concurrent in-stream live views, but totaled with over 4.2 million visitor viewers.

== Format ==
=== Instagram live streaming broadcast ===
In its initial inception, the Verzuz battles were performed remotely over Instagram live due to the COVID-19 pandemic. The majority of U.S. states were under strict quarantine to prevent the spread of Coronavirus. Challengers often used their own cell phone/tablet device or web camera to live-stream on Instagram live through their verified artist page. Initially, challengers added or requested each other's Instagram accounts to communicate virtually on Instagram Live. The first time this format changed was in the challenge between Bounty Killer vs Beenie Man, in which both challengers appeared together under the VerzuzTV Instagram channel instead of their own channels.

The Verzuz battle may consist of up to 20 rounds of what would be an artist's hit songs or hit features/collaborations to go head to head against each other. During the battle, the artist will play each song one after another, through audio sound systems via computer or recording studio equipment. This format has changed also with the battle of Bounty Killer & Beenie Man who fully performed live with microphones along with DJ's/Sound Equipment, which in turn also provided good acoustics and feedback without interruptions. There was a first attempt by record producer Teddy Riley to perform live against Babyface, but because of technical difficulties, it was unsuccessful.

For the majority of the music tracks selected by the artist, they often share personal stories about the creation of the song and the experience surrounding it before playing or performing the track. Oftentimes, the artist on both sides would gloat or boast themselves to show their competitive spirit along with having the authority of 'bragging rights'.

For many of the live broadcasts, the celebratory competitive streaming went on for an estimated two hours long, with the exception of continuing on their own live feed after the event was over to allow fans and followers to engage with them.

In the past, some technicalities forced a video stream to get booted off due to weak Wi-Fi connection, or a licensed copyrighted song that could only be played to a minimum of 90 seconds before being cut off stream. On occasion, most broadcasts had an allotted time of 1 hour per stream, due to Instagram's rules of live streaming, which cause the artist to restart another live session and continue where they left off. However, during the battle of Jill Scott & Erykah Badu, the live feed stayed continuous for more than 2 hours except for when Badu's livestream stopped because of Wi-Fi issues.

Viewers who are observing the challenges can watch the feed from their electronic device, phone, tablet or computer with their Instagram accounts. It is simultaneously enjoyed as a watch party or listening party with other individuals, whether at home together or as a virtual population over the live stream. Viewers interact by commenting their opinions, judgement, reactions, emotions, and may use special character emojis as a form of expression. Some individuals may try to keep score but ultimately get lost in the rounds.

=== Technical issues ===
The streaming service was mired in technical impediments since its inception. Because of the overwhelming response of complaints from viewers, Swizz and Timbaland implemented a new rule on May 25, 2020, that the future participants are required to use equipment kit provided by the brand Roland, who created a new set up to supply the best audio as possible to prevent issues from continuing. The organizers stated, "You cannot do VERZUZ unless you use the technology that we're sending you, because we're sending it to you for a reason."

=== New broadcast ===
As nationwide quarantine started to loosen restrictions of social gatherings and began to start public re-opening phases, the lineups in the 2nd part of the series broadcast the event live in-person to stream over Instagram as well as Apple Music, which began streaming the presentation live in HD on June 19, 2020. The live broadcast feed presented by Apple Music, is recorded using Television Studio equipment, teleprompters and a simple character generator editing used to display viewer comments from Twitter, also a ticker format of the stylized names of the challengers integrating with the Verzuz 'V' logo, along with providing the sponsors. As with the Instagram live presentation, it continued in the same format as the first series with improvements of the audio quality as a result of using the Roland equipment.

The new updated series stayed consistent of having challengers meet face to face sharing one room often with DJs or piano accompaniment while continuing to social distance. The participants gathered with an entourage as the event was held from a selected venue. Locations of the venue included, Tyler Perry Studios, which was used for the Brandy vs Monica broadcast and the Fillmore theater in Philadelphia, used for the Gladys Knight vs Patti LaBelle broadcast. The Bounty Killer vs Beanie Man Verzuz in the first series, was held at a club venue in Jamaica, and was the first in-person webcast stream. The only time the new broadcast reverted to its original "duo split-screen style" streaming was in the Verzuz challenge between Ashanti vs Keyshia Cole, due to high rate of California's COVID-19 social distance protocols. It streamed on Instagram live with the Verzuz and Keyshia Cole's live channels, and on Apple Music live broadcast split-screen side by side; and the Triller/Fite TV broadcast Verzuz featuring Eve vs Trina. where Eve was remote live via satellite from the United Kingdom, while Trina was live on location with full audience in Miami, Florida.

The Verzuz broadcast of Brandy vs Monica broke records in numbers over Instagram with over 1.2 million live viewers on that platform being the first webcast to reach that peak, although during the Teddy Riley vs Babyface broadcast in the first series, it was reported 3.7 million people attempted access to view the live broadcast but was unsuccessful of joining the feed due to Instagram live viewership algorithm never reaching 1 million, forcing viewers losing the place of joining the stream upon exiting and possibly being locked out of viewing the stream. The result of this later began to open the population for more viewership on Instagram.

=== The Verzuz Effect ===
Source:

== Battles ==
Each battle is often paired up by the genre of categories. Where a Music producer will go up against another Music Producer, Songwriter against Songwriter, Vocal Production (example: Vocal Artist against Vocal Artist [Sub category: Singer vs. Singer or Rapper vs. Rapper]). Each artist has up to 20 tracks prepared to use in the battle. The guidelines for competing are to have produced, written or sang on the track used. As for many rap artists, they can use their collaborations or 'feature' segments from other artist tracks. Producers who 'remixed' a track have been called in question, especially if they are not the originator of the song produced, as a pun joke from Babyface, but is still acceptable as it is a form of their own works. The winners are solely to the discretion of the viewers' preference, there are no direct chosen winners, however accolades surrounding an artist's accomplishments may make one person outshine the next. The real winners are the views counted by how many tuned in to watch as it shows the popularity and support given. During the battle, they are allowed to gloat, flaunt, tease as it is friendly competition. Spectators, whether celebrities or general viewing public, keep score on who they believe won each round sometimes losing count. The challenger usually feeds off the last contender's song choice or word play 'puns' to complement the flow. The curators who preside over the live feed remotely monitor the competition.

=== Verzuz Season 1 ===
==== Part 1 ====
Quarantine / Remote Virtual Webcast (Instagram Live)
| # | Line Up / Match | Episode | Category | Date | Instagram Live Concurrent Viewers (estimated views based on the visitor peak during the live presentation - Not total) | Duration | Billboard Scorecard Winner (WINS|LOSS|DRAW) |
|---|---|---|---|---|---|---|---|
| 1 | Swizz Beatz vs Timbaland | 1 | Music Production & Songwriting/Vocals | March 24, 2020 | 22,000 apex peak | 5 Hours | No Data Available |
| 2 | Boi-1da vs Hit-Boy | 2 | Music Production & Songwriting/Vocals | March 27, 2020 | 18,600 apex peak | 2 Hours | No Data Available |
| 3 | The Dream vs Sean Garrett | 3 | Songwriting & Music Production | March 28, 2020 | 46,000 apex peak | N/A | No Data Available |
| 4 | Ne-Yo vs Johnta Austin | 4 | Songwriting & Music Production | March 29, 2020 | 80,300 apex peak | N/A | No Data Available |
| 5 | Scott Storch vs Mannie Fresh | 5 | Music Production & Songwriting/Vocals | April 1, 2020 | 145,000 apex peak | N/A | No Data Available |
| 6 | Ryan Tedder vs Benny Blanco | 6 | Music Production & Songwriting/Vocals | April 2, 2020 | 12,000 apex peak | N/A | No Data Available |
| 7 | T-Pain vs Lil Jon | 7 | Music Production & Songwriting/Vocals | April 4, 2020 | 270,000 apex peak | N/A | No Data Available |
| 8 | RZA vs DJ Premier | 8 | Music Production & Songwriting/Vocals | April 11, 2020 | 150,000 apex peak | N/A | DJ PREMIER (14-9-2) |
| 9 | Teddy Riley vs Babyface | 9 | Music Production / Songwriting & Vocal Recording | April 18, 2020 April 20 (Rematch) | 400,000 (Day 1); 500,000 (Rematch) apex peak 3.7 million attempted access | 1 Hour; 1 Hour 40 Minutes | BABYFACE (13-10-2) |
| 10 | Erykah Badu vs Jill Scott | 10 | Vocal Production / Songwriting & Recording | May 9, 2020 | 700,000 apex peak | 3 Hours | ERYKAH BADU(11-9-4) |
| 11 | Nelly vs Ludacris | 11 | Vocal Production / Songwriting & Recording | May 16, 2020 | 500,000 apex peak | 2 Hours | LUDACRIS (12-9-4) |
| 12 | † Bounty Killer vs Beenie Man | 12 | Vocal Production / Songwriting & Recording | May 23, 2020 | 500,000 apex peak | 1 Hour 50 Minutes | BEENIE MAN (13-10-3) |
| 13 | † 112 vs Jagged Edge | 13 | Vocal Productions / Songwriting & Recording | May 25, 2020 | 262,000 apex peak | 1 Hour 40 Minutes | 112 (13-9-3) |

† Other Media have also contributed scorecards for their selected winner:

Vibe Magazine Winner: Beenie Man [13–10–3]

Revolt TV News Winner: 112 [11–8–1]

==== Notable moments in Season 1 - Part I ====
- American producer and singer Teddy Riley was the subject of online jokes, parody and criticism for technical difficulties during his battle with Babyface. He was heavily criticized for poor production values, weak Wi-Fi signals and being overconfident. This caused the challenge to be rescheduled for another day. Nelly also faced similar criticism due to his live feed freezing often and for inaudible audio, for which he blamed "severe weather storms".
- Rapper Ludacris faced backlash after previewing a new song during the battle with Nelly, which contained suggestive humor towards R, Kelly, Bill Cosby and Roseanne Barr. He later addressed the subject on Atlanta's V103 radio show with Big Tigger: "Sometimes when you speak on record, you speak on it like its just me and you having a conversation as friends, you're just speaking and being honest, and I saw a lot of people misconstrue or didn't understand what I was saying" to which he asked Big Tigger what he thought he meant and Tigger response to defending him was "I think what you're trying to say is: 'I love his music and what he brought to the table but I am a father of daughters and you're not going to be around my daughters' " Ludacris responded: "You're a smart man, it's just that simple".
- During the Bounty Killa vs Beenie Man battle, police interrupted to address possible noise or social distancing complaints. The situation was quickly de-escalated and the battle continued uninterrupted.
- The May 25, 2020 battle of 112 and Jagged Edge did not feature 112 members Daron Jones and Q Parker, who exited the group in 2019. Legendary R&B singer Keith Sweat made a brief on-screen appearance in 112's live stream to show support of both artists. Jagged Edge faced technical difficulties with their audio which led to another series of online jokes. 112 boasted about their Grammy and MTV Video Music Awards for "I'll Be Missing You" and repeatedly highlighted Ciroc bottles showing their respect for the founder and chief executive of their former label Bad Boy Records, Diddy. Music producers Jermaine Dupri and Bryan-Michael Cox were also in attendance with Jagged Edge.

==== Part 2 ====
Verzuz went under new rule changes and technical maintenance to provide quality performances and returned on May 31, 2020, with a special Verzuz.

Each broadcast in this 2nd part of the series stayed consistent with better video and audio quality.

Live In-Studio/Theater/Venue Webcast (Instagram Live & Apple Music)
| # | Line Up / Match | Episode | Category | Date | Instagram Live Concurrent Viewers (estimated views based on the visitor peak during the live presentation - Not total) | Duration | Billboard Scorecard Winner |
|---|---|---|---|---|---|---|---|
| 14 ♥♥ | Kirk Franklin vs Fred Hammond with opening words and prayer by Bishop T.D. Jakes | 14 | "THE HEALING" – Special Edition Gospel music Production / Songwriting & Vocals | May 31, 2020 | 276,000 apex peak | 2 Hours 20 Minutes | NO JUDGMENTS |
| 15 | Alicia Keys vs John Legend | 15 | "JUNETEENTH CELEBRATION" - Special Edition Music Production / Songwriting & Vocals | June 19, 2020 | 154,000 apex peak | 2 Hours 30 Minutes | NO JUDGMENTS |
| 16 | † Fabolous vs JadaKiss | 16 | Hip Hop Music Production, Songwriting/Lyrics & Vocals | June 29, 2020 | 387,000 apex peak | 1 Hour 20 Minutes | JADAKISS (15-9-2) |
| 17 | DMX vs Snoop Dogg | 17 | Hip Hop Music Production, Songwriting/Lyrics & Vocals | July 22, 2020 | 525,000 apex peak | 2 Hours | DMX (12-10-4) |
| 18 | Rick Ross vs 2 Chainz | 18 | Hip Hop Music Production, Songwriting/Lyrics & Vocals | August 6, 2020 | 215,000 apex peak | 2 Hours | RICK ROSS (11-10-4) |
| 19 | Brandy vs Monica (Live from Tyler Perry Studios) | 19 | Pop/R&B Music Production, Songwriting/Lyrics & Vocals | August 31, 2020 | 1.4 million apex peak | 2 Hours 30 Minutes | BRANDY(12-7-5) |
| 20 | Gladys Knight vs Patti LaBelle (Live from THE FILLMORE in Philadelphia) | 20 | "ONE NIGHT ONLY MASTER CLASS" R&B/Soul Music Production Songwriting/Lyrics & Vocals | September 13, 2020 | 600,000 apex peak | 2 Hours | ≠ DRAW TIE GLADYS KNIGHT & PATTI LABELLE (7-7-5) |

♥♥ *A Special VERZUZ webcast titled "The Healing" was streamed live on May 31, 2020, in honor of lifting awareness and providing comfort from the racial climate of ongoing police brutality in the United States. The event began with opening word and prayer by Bishop T.D. Jakes. Kirk Franklin & Fred Hammond celebrated various music from their catalog. During the webcast, special appearances were made by notable stars in the gospel genre: Grammy Nominated Gospel Artist Marvin Sapp, appeared to interlude his landmark song "Never Would Have Made It" and Grammy Award winner, Tamela Mann appeared to fully sing live, "Take Me To The King". Even though this special verzuz was a celebration with no intentions to battle and was used as a platform service to uplift and heal the world, Revolt TV declared Kirk Franklin as champion scoring at 17–4.

† Other Media have also contributed scorecards for their selected winner:

Revolt TV News Winner: Jadakiss [11–9]

≠ DRAW/TIE - According to the Billboard Magazine Scorecard, Gladys Knight & Patti LaBelle both won for their Verzuz match, respectively. Making them the first contenders judged from Billboard to score a draw in the series.

==== Notable moments in Season 1 - Part II ====
- During the special Verzuz dubbed "The Healing", Kirk Franklin started off the celebration with some light humor addressing his height and also his facial resemblance with the rapper Plies, while playing the keyboard; he provided comic relief throughout the webcast. Fred Hammond broke down and shed tears while singing his song, "Just To Be Close to You", Kirk also shared a flirty dance with his wife during his song "Melodies From Heaven". Hammond and Franklin takes a brief moment to call in to send comfort to Ahmaud Arbery's mother, and offer support and prayers. Fred Hammond ended the celebration with a touching, spiritual, final prayer.
- In the Alicia Keys vs John Legend Verzuz, Legend was constantly teased in the comments for his tropical sweater and simple go to move: The "1-2-Step" dance during his song selections. Alicia re-enacted her famous phone call scene from "You Don't Know My Name", accompanied by Legend, who sang the background vocals and played piano. John Legend played 2 newly released singles "U Move, I Move" feat. Jhene Aiko and "Never Break".
- During the DMX vs Snoop Dogg battle, DMX revealed that he was inspired to use the term "Get at Me Dog" after meeting Snoop Dogg in New York City. Snoop also revealed that a young Bow Wow was the voice used in the "Classroom Intro" skit on Snoop Dogg's seminal debut album Doggystyle leading into the track "Gz and Hustlas", stating Dr. Dre was afraid to use him for the album due to the album being so explicit. He also acknowledged that Pharrell encouraged him to emphasize his "sexy side" for the song "Beautiful", though Snoop was wary of doing so before Pharrell convinced him otherwise. DMX also poked fun at his own weight gain stating he would take off his shirt if the audience live got to 1 million views but they would look like the number '10' on screen (Snoop being 1 for his slim figure and DMX being 0 based on his weight). DMX encouraged young rap artists to "write that pain", after Snoop testified that the lyrics from "Slippin" gave him goose bumps, calling it a "gangsta Holy Ghost". The Verzuz celebration ended with both rappers freestyling to various hip-hop instrumentals.
- In the Rick Ross vs 2 Chainz Verzuz, 2 Chainz employed a stunt in the battle as he used strippers and large amounts of money as props during his verse in "Bands A Make Her Dance", noting that both of the artists are from the southern United States, and how strip clubs "run" the south. Rick Ross's girlfriend Peaches gave Ross a massage during one of his songs and continued to do so for a short time afterwards. Timbaland was in attendance for this battle.
- At the start of the Brandy vs Monica Verzuz, it was said that Senator and Democratic Party vice presidential nominee Kamala Harris sent her blessings and encouragement to the contestants and also urged viewers to vote. Monica confessed she wanted to do a Verzuz after Missy Elliott persuaded her to do so because Monica wanted to have a face to face conversation with Brandy after the years of escalating rumors of a "catfight" between the two which compelled them to settle their differences. Brandy said that she did in fact once have a physical confrontation with Monica years before the battle. Brandy dedicated "Missing You" to various legends who died, while Monica dedicated "For You, I Will" to deceased celebrated basketball player Kobe Bryant's wife Vanessa. Monica played her new song "Trenches".
- The master class Verzuz featuring Patti LaBelle & Gladys Knight was met with both artists admiring each other as they acknowledged how long they have been friends in the entertainment industry. Gladys Knight admitted she was unaware what Verzuz was until her son told her that she should do it, as with Patti acknowledging that her son also persuaded her to do it and mentioned that her choice would be with Gladys. Patti Labelle talk about how difficult it was to shoot the music video to "If You Asked Me To" immediately the day after her sisters funeral. Both ladies made a public service announcement to respect each other after the song "Licence to Kill", stating the name of the song does not give people the right to harm another person. They both gave honorable mentions to many female singers who came before them and after. Patti was not aware of what "Lady Marmalade" meant and said the ladies of Labelle were confronted afterwards for its inappropriate meaning. Former First Lady Michelle Obama and Oprah Winfrey tuned in to the webcast. The celebration ended with a special appearance by their long time friend Dionne Warwick, as they all sang "That's What Friends Are For" & "Superwoman".

=== Verzuz Season 2 ===
Season 2 returned November 19, 2020 on Instagram & Apple Music until February 27, 2021, New challenges began streaming on Instagram & Triller March 20, 2021
| # | Line Up / Match | Episode | Category | Date | Instagram Live Concurrent Viewers (estimated views based on the visitor peak during the live presentation - Not total) | Duration | Billboard Scorecard |
|---|---|---|---|---|---|---|---|
| 21 | Jeezy vs Gucci Mane | 1 | Hip Hop Music Production, Songwriting/Lyrics & Vocals | November 19, 2020 | 1.8 million apex peak | 1 Hour 40 Minutes | JEEZY (12-9-5) |
| 22 | E-40 vs Too Short | 2 | "LEGENDS OF THE BAY" Hip Hop Music Production, Songwriting/Lyrics & Vocals | December 19, 2020 | 271,000 apex peak | 2 Hours 30 Minutes | E-40 (11-10-5) |
| 23 | Ashanti vs Keyshia Cole | 3 | R&B Production, Songwriting/Lyrics & Vocals | January 21, 2021 (Original date-December 11, 2020 - Event was Postponed) | 1.2 million apex peak 1.1 million (steady average) | 2 Hours | ASHANTI (12-10-3) |
| 24 | D'Angelo & Friends (Live at the Apollo Theater) ☆ Solo concert dubbed as "D'Angelo & Friends" | 4 | R&B / Neo Soul Production, Songwriting/Lyrics & Vocals | February 27, 2021 | 130,000 apex peak | 2 Hours | NO COMPETITION |
| 25 | Raekwon vs Ghostface | 5 | Hip Hop Music Production, Songwriting/Lyrics & Vocals | March 20, 2021 | 104,000 apex peak | 2 Hours 30 Minutes | ≠ DRAW TIE RAEKWON & GHOSTFACE (12-12-1) |
| 26 | Earth, Wind & Fire vs The Isley Brothers Hosted by Steve Harvey with special guest resident DJ D-Nice | 6 | R&B/Soul Music Production Songwriting/Lyrics & Vocals | April 4, 2021 | 465,000 apex peak | 3 Hours 30 Minutes | THE ISLEY BROTHERS (16-10-4) |
| 27 | Redman vs Method Man (live at the St. George Theatre) with guest DJ DJ Scratch | 7 | "'HOW HIGH' - 420 SPECIAL" Hip Hop Music Production, Songwriting/Lyrics & Vocals | April 20, 2021 | 175,000 apex peak | 2 Hours 40 Minutes | NO COMPETITION |
| 28 | SWV vs Xscape (with resident DJ's DJ Spinderella / DJ AOne) | 8 | R&B Production, Songwriting/Lyrics & Vocals | May 8, 2021 | 460,000 apex peak | 2 Hours 45 Minutes | SWV(13-11) |
| 29 | REMATCH Swizz Beatz vs Timbaland (live from Club LIV, Miami) | 9 | Music Production & Songwriting/Vocals | May 30, 2021 | 460,000 apex peak | 2 Hours 15 Minutes | TIMBALAND(13-10-3) |
| 30 | Eve vs Trina | 10 | "1st FEMALE RAP VERZUZ" Hip Hop Music Production, Songwriting/Lyrics & Vocals | June 16, 2021 | 335,000 apex peak | 1 Hour | TRINA(12-10-3) |
| 31 | Bow Wow vs Soulja Boy | 11 | Hip Hop Music Production, Songwriting/Lyrics & Vocals | June 26, 2021 | 705,000 apex peak | 1 Hour 25 Minutes | Soulja Boy (11-9-2) |
| 32 | Keith Sweat vs Bobby Brown (with resident DJ DJ Cassidy) | 12 | ESSENCE SPECIAL EVENT R&B Production, Songwriting/Lyrics & Vocals | July 1, 2021 | 400,000 apex peak | 1 Hour 45 Minutes | BOBBY BROWN (15-10) |
| 33 | The Lox vs DipSet (live from the Hulu Theater at Madison Square Garden, Manhattan, New York City) | 13 | Hip Hop Music Production, Songwriting/Lyrics & Vocals | August 3, 2021 | 645,000 apex peak | 2 Hours 15 Minutes | BILLBOARD SCORECARD RESULTS DISCONTINUEDHIGHLIGHTS OF EVENT |
| 34 | Fat Joe vs Ja Rule (live from the Hulu Theater at Madison Square Garden, Manhattan, New York City) | 14 | Hip Hop Music Production, Songwriting/Lyrics & Vocals | September 14, 2021 | 400,000 apex peak | 2 Hours 15 Minutes | BILLBOARD SCORECARD RESULTS DISCONTINUEDHIGHLIGHTS OF EVENT |
| 35 | KRS-One vs Big Daddy Kane (live from Barclay's Center, Brooklyn, New York City) | 15 | Hip Hop Music Production, Songwriting/Lyrics & Vocals | October 17, 2021 | 140,000 apex peak | 2 Hours | BILLBOARD SCORECARD RESULTS DISCONTINUEDHIGHLIGHTS OF EVENT |
| 36 | Chaka Khan vs Stephanie Mills (Live from the United Artist Theater at the Ace Hotel, Los Angeles) | 16 | "A NIGHT FOR THE QUEENS" R&B/Soul Music Production Songwriting/Lyrics & Vocals | November 18, 2021 | 65,000 apex peak | 2 Hours | BILLBOARD SCORECARD RESULTS DISCONTINUEDHIGHLIGHTS OF EVENT |
| 37 | Bone Thugs-n-Harmony vs Three 6 Mafia (Live from Los Angeles) | 17 | Hip Hop Music Production, Songwriting/Lyrics & Vocals | December 2, 2021 | To be determined | 2 Hours 15 Minutes | BILLBOARD SCORECARD RESULTS DISCONTINUEDHIGHLIGHTS OF EVENT |
| 38 | Anthony Hamilton vs Musiq Soulchild (Live from Avalon Hollywood, Los Angeles, CA) | 18 | "VALENTINE'S DAY SPECIAL"R&B/Soul Music Production Songwriting/Lyrics & Vocals | February 15, 2022 | To be determined | 2 Hours 30 Minutes | BILLBOARD SCORECARD RESULTS DISCONTINUEDHIGHLIGHTS OF EVENT |
| 39 | Mary Mary vs BeBe & CeCe Winans | 19 | "EASTER CELEBRATION"Gospel music Production / Songwriting & Vocals | April 17, 2022 | To be determined | | HIGHLIGHTS OF EVENT |
| 40 | Cypress Hill vs Onyx | 20 | Hip Hop Music Production, Songwriting/Lyrics & Vocals | May 14, 2022 | To be determined | | NO HIGHLIGHT REPORTED |
| 41 | 8 Ball and MJG vs UGK (Live from Atlanta, GA) | 21 | Hip Hop Music Production, Songwriting/Lyrics & Vocals | May 26, 2022 | To be determined | | NO HIGHLIGHT REPORTED |
| 42 | Omarion vs Mario featuring Bonus Matchup Bobby V & Ray J vsSammie & Pleasure P (Live from Los Angeles, CA) hosted by DeRay Davis | 22 | "A NIGHT OF R&B"R&B/Soul Music Production Songwriting/Lyrics & Vocals | June 23, 2022 | 500,000 apex peek | 5 Hours | NO HIGHLIGHT REPORTED |
| 43 | Luny Tunes vs DJ Nelson (live from the MLB All Star House 2022) Hollywood Hills, CA | 23 | "A SALUTE TO LATIN MUSIC PRODUCERS"Music Production | July 17, 2022 | N/A | 1 Hour 15 Minutes | |

==== Notable moments in Season 2 ====
- During the Jeezy vs Gucci Mane Verzuz, Jeezy slightly addressed the past 15-year discrepancy between him and Gucci Mane after Gucci performed one of his diss songs towards him, expressing his dislike of that action and that he extended himself to do a verzuz with Gucci for the culture stating "We are the culture". He adds on by giving respect to recent rappers who died, including King Von, Pop Smoke & Nipsey Hussle. The pair ended the verzuz performing their collaborative song "Icy" for the first time in years. Gucci ended with an apology to Jeezy, in which he accepted. The adult club Magic City was the venue used to hold the event. Politician Stacey Abrams virtually opened the event by sending her salute to the contenders and encouraging people to vote in the Georgia Elections. In an Instagram Live following the battle, Swizz & Timbaland reflected on the verzuz and stressed the impact it had on rapper/street beefs and acknowledged that the two made some "Big boy decisions" by ending their 15-year dispute, hoping it will lead to less violence from upcoming and present rappers.
- Just hours before the December 11, 2020 live battle between Ashanti vs Keyshia Cole, Ashanti posted a statement via her Instagram page that she tested Positive for COVID-19 expressing: "Hey y'all I can't believe I'm saying this but I tested positive for COVID-19. I'm ok and not in pain. I'm actually down to do the verzuz from my house...we're trying to figure it all out!!! She further went on Instagram live to express her disappointment, and made it clear that she got it from a family member after she came back from a trip to Nairobi, and did not contract it as a result from traveling. She tested 7 times before the Verzuz, and also said her symptoms were small nasally/tight cough as well as not being able to taste and smell. However, she excitedly felt she is still ready to go. She described finding humor after being diagnosed by hearing the serious but comical sound byte of Cardi B, screaming "Coronavirus!!!" Keyshia Cole joined the live moments later and expressed that both her and Ashanti felt its better to postpone. Keyshia also expressed she rather hug and give respect to her personally, and send out her care and well wishes for Ashanti.
- The Verzuz between "E-40 vs Too Short", displayed a simple yellow-gold halo set with black Cali-style sportscars Ford Mustang and Falcon, and street signs with their hometowns, Oakland and Vallejo. Both E-40 and Too Short opened up that they knew each other since the 1980s decade where Too Short sold $5 custom made audio cassette tapes in East Oakland while E-40 sold mixtapes out of his cars. E-40 also spoke of making music in 1988, in which both have music ranging from the 1980s to the present day. What kept them connected was that they were hustlers in the street and by music. They got knowledge from the "OG's" 3 generations before them, where they absorbed the information and passed it on, E-40 recognized himself as an unorthodox rapper. They both revealed they looked up to P. Diddy and often speak to him. E-40 talked about being influenced in the 1970s by the song "Rapper's Delight", and also by other artists of the 80s, Kurtis Blow, Run DMC, and Kool Herc. Too short performed and dedicated his song "The Ghetto" to the streets of the West Side. E-40 performed his verse on the popular "I Got 5 On It" remix. After performing "Snap Yo Fingers", they both spoke of how they were introduced to Lil Jon, mentioning him to be a humbled 'super cool' guy. Too Short showed off his custom made autographed Oakland Golden State Warriors basketball jersey signed by the head coach Steve Kerr with the autograph "may the best bars win". He also gave a lesson on what the 'Bay Area' is, while also listing the rap artists who hail from those areas. Too Short encouraged the streets to "put the guns away and enjoy getting money". The celebration ended with the pair performing their duets including their collaboration of the track "Bitch".
- In a Verzuz first since its new inception, the Ashanti vs Keyshia Cole celebration streamed live split screen on both Instagram and Apple Music platforms due to California's COVID high rate precaution measures. However the event started over an hour late as Ashanti warmed up the virtual audience playing snippets of her new songs and also did a sing along with songs in the DJ's playlist until Keyshia was able to arrive. The challenge started and went back to back consistently with both performers singing along to their tracks. Comments in the feed took notice of Keyshia's blunt and sporadic-tense energy during her first few songs, which sparked a few jokes. After singing "Ain't It Funny", Ashanti revealed she almost signed to Bad Boy Records at age 13, and that she co-wrote the song with Jennifer Lopez, despite the rumors escalating from it. Keyshia Cole also revealed she was almost signed to Death Row Records, and the connection she had with 2Pac through her brother with the song "Playa Cardz Right". The comic relief came when rapper O.T. Genasis, who previously remade and covered her classic song "Love" appeared to comically sing with her, which seemed to calm her nerves as she expressed she 'felt better'. Ashanti expressed not having any idea that her song "Rain on Me" would touch women lives by empowering them. The celebration ended with both artists showcasing newly released songs from their upcoming album.
- The D'Angelo & Friends Verzuz was the first solo Verzuz presented in the series. Streamed live at the historic world famous Apollo Theater in Harlem, New York. The concert was intimately showcased similar to an NPR 'Tiny Desk' concert. Special guests who appeared to perform alongside D'Angelo featured Keyon Harrold who played the trumpet in his opening song. Redman and Method Man appeared to perform "Left & Right" and "Break Ups 2 Make Ups". H.E.R. surprised D'Angelo and they both revealed they were each other's biggest fan, she performed a duo-medley of songs "Best Part" and "Nothing Even Matters", in which D'Angelo joined in on his verse. He was so inspired by her presence that he said he was 'putting it in the universe' to make a song with her in the future titled "HER & HIM". D'Angelo also performed various hits such as "Cruisin'", "Lady", "Devil's Pie", "Brown Sugar" and ended with his most popular critically acclaimed track "Untitled (How Does it Feel)", in which he made a comedic gag during the song suggesting someone is going to get 'lined up tonight' (a term used by black barbers who shape-up and construct the hairline on a person's head. And also hinting most barbers set the ambiance and tone by playing this song and/or other neo-soul songs while cutting hair). Swizz and Timbaland revealed in their post-show live stream that the Verzuz was originally supposed to be D’Angelo versus Maxwell. Maxwell had to back out for undisclosed reasons, and D’Angelo agreed to continue on with the broadcast solo.
- March 20, 2021 began the new venture of Verzuz streaming on the Triller website & app. starting with the Raekwon vs Ghostface Killah challenge. Both members shared past experiences from their Wu-Tang Clan and solo journeys. Ghostface expressed later in the live stream how hard it was to keep a 9 member group together and also ended one of his final selection pick with "All That I Got Is You", deeply expressing and encouraging viewers to understand how precious life is and respect others by not taking anything for granted.
- The "Earth Wind & Fire vs The Isley Brothers" verzuz was the first presentation to be streamed with television studio multicam recorded at 23 frames per second. D-Nice appeared as the special guest resident DJ of the night. Steve Harvey hosted the full show giving personal commentary in between. The challengers present were, Ron and Ernie Isley who represented for The Isley Brothers and Verdine White, Ralph Johnson & Philip Bailey who represented for Earth Wind and Fire. Phillip Bailey expressed to Harvey that they considered him as an on set coach of how he was with everyone behind the scenes. Some of the songs featured was “Let's Groove”, “Reasons”, “Groove With You”, Would You Mind”, “It's Your Thing”, “Footsteps in the Dark”, Shining Star” and “Choosey Lover”. Ron Isley was well received by many for his new image appeal, where fans labeled him as a "DILF", "The Cat Daddy" and "Zaddy" (slang terms used to describe an older man of mature age who has sex appeal.)
- The Redman vs Method Man Verzuz 4/20 Concert Special was streamed live at the Apollo Theater in NYC and began with a huge electronic soundstage screen which displayed the childhood photos of the duo. The make shift set reminisced a basketball court in a neighborhood public park surrounded by traditional woven wired fences and benches, a basketball hoop with backboard in the middle with a giant ‘V’ representing the Verzuz brand. The video backdrop used multiple clips of park graffiti, handball courts, NYC subway and scenery. The duo performed their songs from their respective albums, Blackout! & Blackout! 2 as well as the How High Soundtrack along with their features and solo ventures. Special guest performances featured Keith Murray. RZA and Inspectah Deck, Streetlife, K-Solo, EPMD, Hit Squad/Def Squad, Cappadonna, and DoItAll, who also made a public service announcement that he would be running as a councilman in New Jersey. Russell Simmons also made a virtual appearance from his phone device. DJ Kool made a guest appearance to perform his celebrated track "Let Me Clear My Throat", which is in its 25th anniversary since debuting. The special concert closed out with Rockwilder making an appearance, for his contribution in producing the popular hit "Da Rockwilder", and they announced a follow-up album "Blackout! 3" will be released in the future. The recorded frames per second displayed for streaming has also changed from 24 fps to 60 fps as it gave the visuals an authentic concert-like view.
- The SWV vz Xscape Verzuz took place in Atlanta, Georgia, the ladies all coordinated their fashion wear colored in all styles Black. Guest Appearances was made by Jermaine Dupri who lead "Just Kickin' It" and Da Brat, who also performed along with Xscape for the remix of Mariah Carey's "Always Be My Baby" (Mr. Dupri Mix), Kandi Burruss showcased the song she wrote for Destiny's Child, "Bills, Bills, Bills". A new added element to the Verzuz show introduced the Doritos Fan Choice Moment, where the song "Right Here" was chosen from the fans. The highlights from the first half were the songs of the last round of the segment, when Xscape performed "Tonight", as Tiny gave a rousing performance during her verse and when SWV performed their rendition to Patti LaBelle's song "If Only You Knew", as Coko gave her all towards the end despite going through an anxiety attack that emotionally affected her because of a tragedy she witnessed during the early hours of the day, which she later confirmed on social media. The highlights of the second half was Xscape performance of "Do You Want To" which was cut off early from DJ AOne but was encored by the audience to perform a redo. Followed by SWV's performance of "Rain". Selected solo features were also performed, Tiny & Kandi reflected and performed on their hit song they wrote for TLC "No Scrubs", which also mashed up with "Shape of You" by Ed Sheeran, which Kandi also acquired rights to for the sample used. Kandi also sang her verse that was featured on E-40's track "U and Dat", while Coko performed her featured vocals from "Men In Black". She also shared a moment on stage with her older son to sing her solo hit song "Sunshine". SWV also performed their iconic hit "Anything" as Xscape performed "Who Can I Run To", which they shared the stage with Coko to sing part of the verse after she went viral for covering their verse before the battle. Other songs performed were: "Can We", "The Arms of the One Who Loves You", "Downtown", "Everything I Love", "You're the One" (D.J. Clark Kent Remix and original track), "I'm So into You", "My Little Secret", "Ain't No Man", "Use Your Heart", "Love On My Mind", "Always on my Mind". The celebration ended with SWV performing their song "Weak" with an acoustic introduction, while Xscape closed out with "Understanding".
- The rematch verzuz between Swizz Beatz vs Timbaland was the first versus to have a full live audience in a club venue since the web series inception. The concert was also reminiscent to the first producer battle they began in 2018. Celebrated songs featured tracks they produced for ranging from Beyoncé, Jay-Z, Rihanna, Nicki Minaj, Aaliyah, Ruff Ryders, DMX, Eve, Missy Elliott among others.
- The Eve vs Trina match took place in both Miami, Florida (Trina) and London, England (Eve). It was first event to be sponsored by TBS new series Friday Night Vibes. The event also honored Tupac Shakur with a tribute video celebrating his 50th birthday.
- The Bow Wow and Soulja Boy Verzuz was live in Los Angeles. Both artists shared high energetic competitive chemistry throughout the presentation as Bow Wow played a past recording rant from Soulja Boy, who compared himself to Bow Wow. Soulja Boy also fell under criticism for being the first artist on Verzuz to perform his song more than twice, in which one of the time French Montana appeared to perform his verse on “She Make it Clap”. Famed talk show host DJ Akedemiks was also in attendance In support of Soulja Boy. Jermaine Dupri, Da Brat and Pimpin’ of Dem Franchise Boyz appeared to perform their song I Think They Like Me; DJ Paul of Three 6 Mafia also made an appearance with Bow Wow. Omarion appeared to perform Let Me Hold You. Romeo Miller appeared on behalf of Souja Boy to perform a medley of his own songs. Reuniting with Bow wow for the first time on stage in 20 years.
- The Lox vs DipSet Verzuz was held at the Hulu Theater at Madison Square Garden after Triller Fight Club featuring a main event of Mike Wilson vs Mike “The Bounty” Hunter, where later, at the start of the battle, Hunter later took a brief appearance bow after winning his match. In a Verzuz first, famed sporting ring announcer Michael Buffer took the stage to introduce the two competitors. Nigel Lythgoe, who launched “So You Think You Can Fight” part of Triller's Fight Club, was in attendance as show runner. Both groups were met with high energy and competitive spirit, but The Lox won a decisive victory with professionalism and preparedness attributed as major factors. Moments in the battle included Jadakiss calling out Dipset for rapping over tracks including their vocals instead of using instrumentals before performing his freestyle over The Notorious B.I.G.'s "Who Shot Ya?" released on his 2010 mixtape The Champ Is Here, Pt. 3 and the Lox responding to Diplomats jabs with chosen songs. First, Jadakiss responded to Cam'ron's remark before performing "Welcome to New York City" that the Lox did not have a New York record that could not beat it, to which Jadakiss responded with his verse on Ja Rule's "New York" that also featured Fat Joe, who was in attendance (Jadakiss also performed the verse when Fat Joe and Ja Rule faced each other in the subsequent Verzuz at the same venue). A Juelz Santana jab after Cam'ron's "Hey Ma" that the Lox had no records for female fans was then responded to with a medley that included "Ryde or Die, Bitch" featuring Eve followed by remixes featuring them of Mariah Carey's "Honey", Jennifer Lopez's "Jenny from the Block" and Mary J. Blige's "Family Affair", plus Sheek Louch's "Good Love" and Jadakiss' "Knock Yourself Out". Styles P also shouted out incarcerated ByrdGang member Max B – who Jim Jones had an ongoing feud with – before performing his verses in Akon's "Locked Up". Following their victory, streams of Lox music increased by 215%, including Jadakiss' "Who Shot Ya?" freestyle (both studio and live versions) being added to the iTunes Store and Apple Music. Jadakiss was also dubbed "Mr. Verzuz" after becoming the first artist to win two battles and was able to restructure his Def Jam contract. Just over a year after the battle while they were performing at LL Cool J's Rock The Bells festival at Forest Hills Stadium in Queens, Jadakiss presented Styles P and Sheek Louch with Lox championship rings and unveiled his.
- The Fat Joe vs Ja Rule verzuz went live at the Hulu Theater in New York City. Remy Ma appeared to perform "Lean Back "and "All the Way Up". Lil' Mo and Murder Inc. rapper Vita made an appearance to perform “Put It on Me”. Lil Mo’ also appeared to perform “I Cry”. Other feature performers were Dre who appeared with Fat Joe to do “So Excited” Nelly appeared to perform “Get It Poppin’” and to perform his hit “Hot in Herre” Ashanti shared the stage with both Ja Rule and Fat Joe to perform their classics “Mesmerize”,“What's Luv?" and “Always On Time” The celebration ended with both challengers performing alongside Jadakiss their collaborative anthem“ New York”. A few crowd teaser moments from the verzuz made its way to social media creating a buzz after show including: Nelly, who once dated Ashanti, pushed his way across the stage in mid performance during Fat Joe's set to approach her and hug her, This was their first reunion seeing each other since their split years ago, she jokingly spoke candidly after the show about it on Instagram live with Fat Joe, Remy Ma, Ja Rule. Towards the end of the verzuz, Fat Joe expressed his appreciation and surprised Remy Ma and Ashanti with gifting them with Hermes Birkin handbags. Fat Joe also faced criticism for his hype antics which led to a few minor issues over social media including implying that Ja Rule was the Drake before Drake. and his indirect derogatory and vulgar language to Ja Rule's featured guest who at the time did not appear on stage, but was taken offensively from Lil' Mo and Vita who appeared shortly after his statements. He later apologized about his statements as Remy Ma came to his defense, subsequently Lil Mo' also forgave him after becoming vocal about the incident.
- A Night of R&B Verzuz on June 24, 2022, was met with chaotic reviews from their tense matches. The celebration was hosted by comedian DeRay Davis and it was the first time Verzuz implemented a pre-show opening match between artists. The event ended after 4.5 hours due to running overtime, which ended 1:30 am the next day on the East Coast, rather than the earlier time they were live from in California. it was the latest any Verzuz match has ever ran. The evening kicked off with a pre-show match featuring Ray J & Bobby V vs Sammie & Pleasure P., leading to the main match headliners, Omarion vs Mario.

A lot of heavy criticism about the behavior and pitch quality of vocals from majority of the artists were overshadowed from the overall celebration, particularly centered and focused more on Ray J and Omarion, who were falling flat on their notes during their performances, as they both complained the sound systems were not in their favor. Expressing they could not hear themselves singing due to the microphone leveling and music playback leveling. During all the matches, it was met with intense hardcore back and forth banter and hype between the artists. During the pre-show match, Sammie imitated the vocal hook of Ray J's song "One Wish" where he confidently teased "I sound better than you on your shit", which later set the tone to Ray J being overshadowed by Bobby V., Pleasure P, and Sammie who huddled as they repeatedly harmonized the hook, after Ray J's vocal struggle performing the song.

It briefly deflected the attention away from Ray J, which he seemed to show a slight frustration and disappointment by his facial expressions, walking away. He responded by telling the artist they don't own their own records, which was an unfinished conversation and debate by Ray J, Sammie and Bobby V. who went live on Instagram a few days earlier and disputed their claims of ownership of records. Ray J also expressed his excuse as to why he was pitchy due to feeling both "lit" (tipsy or drunk), and because he was holding his son due to him and his wife level of comfortability of anyone having access of their child. Pleasure P expressed he felt he had more hits than anyone on stage, due to his writing production and credits, while Bobby V showcased his ability to woo the crowd. The pre-show time ran overtime as Omarion and Mario were about 2 hours late to the event.

During the main event, Mario started off by insulting Omarion with an imitation B2K to acknowledge he needed his group members to help him but failed to bring them to the event to do so. Omarion struggled majority of the night with keeping up with his vocals but was able to make efforts to rebound particularly with his signature dance sequences and a few antics. He showcased his innuendo sexual skills by gyrating the microphone stand on stage as well as inviting his brother O'Ryan, who served as his DJ, to come center stage and showcase their cunnilingus skills using a quarter of a fraction-sliced watermelon. Mario simply crooned the crowd round by round with his strong and crisp vocals which became as effortless, proving himself by boasting after every song out loud claiming "It's me" and acknowledged he didn't need any gimmicks to showcase his ability, calling out Omarion labeling him a "dancing (expletive N-word)" Mario was also viewed as the villain and antagonist as he bluntly and aggressively bullied Omarion throughout the event shaming him playfully telling him and others they sound "crazy".

One actual moment where Mario ridiculed Omarion was as Omarion finished the B2K song "Gots Ta Be", Mario exposed Omarion to own up and confess that the vocals on the track were actually vocals recorded by legendary group Troop member, Steve Russell, which the members of B2K later confirmed. Omarion brought out Jeremih as a guest, but quickly turned sour as his vocals were pitchy while trying to serenade the audience with roses by a brief a cappella ad-lib freestyle leading to the chorus of his own song "Oui". Omarion also brought out Tank to sing the song "O" which Tank wrote for him, and they shared a brief vocal moment to which Mario sidelined by stepping in the middle and competing his vocals against theirs showing more vocal range against the other two. Many viewers unanimously in their own opinion crowned Mario the champion by the end of the evening, as well as favored Sammie as their unsung heroes, claiming them as underrated singers. Mario went on to claim his own victory after the event reposting many memes and adding his own bragging rights. The next day had an online banter between B2K members Raz-B, J-Boog and Lil' Fizz who expressed themselves over how they felt about their fellow lead member. They simultaneously posted a video clip of the biopic The Temptations, where member David Ruffin was being fired or exiled from the group as the rest of the members watched from the distance.

The post was captioned by all three members quoting "YOU GOT SERVED" with a pen in hand emoji symbol. To which Omarion responded hours later calling them "background dancers" and claimed they always been "praying for his downfall" since they were in the group. Hours later J-Boog, backed by the other 2 members rebutted on social media to expose and slander Omarion with a long 10-page meme rant post written by J-Boog about their journey before and during their history while active in the music boy band to which he expressed his anger and frustration. Raz B followed by releasing an official legal contract which displayed Omarion's dismissal from the group a few year prior. All of these issues were unfolding to the public eye online, while Sammie and Bobby V shared healthy competitive spirit while making an appearance at a venue they shared on the same day. Ray J sister, Brandy, also took to social media to express her disappointment towards her brother in a lengthy comment under the blog site The Shade Room post, to which he kept deleting her comment from his own profile posts. She expressed that if he would have listened to her instructions on being on vocal rest and drink the tea that their father sent, he might have performed better. This Verzuz was the most talked about Verzuz all on social media platforms as it went viral with humiliating memes, videos and opinionated posts.

=== Verzuz 3.0 season 3 ===
In early November 2022, Swizz Beatz and Timbaland announced via Instagram that a new season would be coming soon. This announcement comes after the success of the lawsuit settlement with Triller.

In autumn 2025, after a 3-year hiatus, Timbaland and Swizz partnered with Complex Con and announced the return of Verzuz live in Las Vegas, with the battle of Cash Money Records VS No Limit Records. The foregoing events will be streamed on Apple Music, Apple TV and on Instagram live feed channels via @applemusic, @complex and @verzuztv.

Season 3 of Verzuz returned to their original streaming partnership with Apple TV & Apple Music
| # | Lineup/Match | Episode | Category | Date | Duration |
|---|---|---|---|---|---|
| 44 | Cash Money Records vs No Limit Records (live from ComplexCon at the Las Vegas Convention Center) Hosted by: Ebro | 1 | Hip Hop Music Production, Songwriting/Lyrics & Vocals | October 25, 2025 | 1 Hour 15 Minutes |
| 45 | Hit-Boy vs Mike WiLL Made-It "The Return of the Producers" (live from Apple Music Studios in Los Angeles) | 2 | Music Production & Songwriting/Vocals | January 30, 2026 | |
| 46 | Tank vs Tyrese "For the Ladies" (live from Apple Music Studios in Los Angeles) Complex Pre/After Show Hosted by: Ebro & Jordan Rose | 3 | R&B Music Production, Songwriting/Lyrics & Vocals | March 26, 2026 | 2 Hours |
| 47 | Rick Ross vs French Montana | 4 | Hip Hop Music Production, Songwriting/Lyrics & Vocals | May 7, 2026 | |
| 48 | B2K vs Pretty Ricky | 5 | R&B Music Production, Songwriting/Lyrics & Vocals | June 25, 2026 | |
| 49 | The Game vs YG "Compton Forever" | 6 | Hip Hop Music Production, Songwriting/Lyrics & Vocals | July 23, 2026 | |
| 50 | Joe vs Donell Jones "R&B Nights" Hosted by: Estelle | 7 | R&B Music Production, Songwriting/Lyrics & Vocals | August 20, 2026 | |
| 51 | Case vs Carl Thomas "I Wish You Never Teased Me" Hosted by: Nedeska | 8 | R&B Music Production, Songwriting/Lyrics & Vocals | October 22, 2026 | 1 Hour 30 minutes |

==== Notable Moments in Season 3 ====
- The return of Verzuz began with the Cash Money Records vs No Limit Records. Turk and Lil' Wayne were absent during the event. Viewers took noticed of Toni Braxton missing from the stage in support of her husband Birdman, instead her sister Tamar Braxton present on stage wiping sweat off his bald head and was also seen twerking during "Back That Azz Up". Juvenile and B.G. mostly carried the show for their entourage. Snoop Dogg made a surprise appearance during No Limit set to perform "Down For My N's". After the show it was noted by the host Ebro of Hot97 expressing the audience wasn't as enthusiastic during some of No Limit Records set.
- The Tank vs Tyrese Verzuz, began with playful banter. Chingy made a surprise appearance to perform the song he was featured on with Tyrese "Pullin' me Back". Tank brought out fellow R&B Money Podcast co-star and artist J. Valentine to perform "Slow". Tank threw subtle jabs at Tyrese over his slow paced singing as they needed to be aware of the time on the clock. Pleasure P was set to appear to perform "Under", but was delayed by the airport traffic, however the songwriter of the track, Bobby Newt, brother of J. Valentine, appeared on stage to duet the song with Tank. Gavyn Rhone of 3rd Storee/Chapter 4 fame, who was part of the background trio for Tank, helped to feature Omarion's. "O", a song Tank also written. Candice Boyd also part of Tank's background vocalist trio help to give tribute to Aaliyah singing "Come Over", a song Tank was featured in. Kenyon Dixon, who sung background for Tyrese helped Tank sing Marques Houston's "Naked", which Tank co-wrote as well. Tyrese spontaneous multiple wardrobe changes during the night became the drive that fueled Tank to make hilarious subtle improvisational commentary after each few rounds of the Verzuz, with one becoming a memorable comedic-melodic impromptu ad-lib, roasting Tyrese about his attire, leading the background vocalists to join him teasing the catchphrase "...That Turtleneck", which Tyrese later willfully joined Tank being a team sport. LeToya Luckett made a surprise appearance to sing "Regret" a song Tank co-wrote. Jamie Foxx made a surprise appearance to perform "Do What It Do", another song co-written by Tank. Trey Songz made a surprise appearance to duet "When We" (remix). Tank brough out his wife and kids, and Tyrese brought out his current woman, to which he joked earlier in the match to Tank that they would need to borrow his song to romance to later. Tyrese joked many times during the match that he won the night. Ginuwine was not able to attend to close out the show with Tank and Tyrese to perform as the trio TGT, due to delays at the airport. During the Complex Magazine after-show, Tank was praised for his comedic timing and Tyrese talks about his transparency about being his authentic self through navigating opinion-based judgements over social media and made light of the competition confession his own crowning for Tank as the winner. Mona Scott-Young made a brief appearance during the after show. In an effort to continue the match after much media conversation over the weeks following, Tank and Tyrese decided to throw a impromptu battle titled Tank vs Tyrese: The Rematch live at the UBS Arena in New York on April 18, 2026. The event is part of the concert line up of The R&B Music Experience: Legacy Series featuring Ginuwine, Llyod, Tamar Braxton, Next and Silk.
- The B2K vs Pretty Ricky versus opened with Rapper Trick Daddy Introducing Pretty Ricky, while Comedian and Actor Affion Crockett introduced B2K, J-Boog began with the most banters towards Pretty Ricky, concerned that fans believed they were more "Teeny-Bopper" musicians whereas Pretty Ricky's behavior at the time of adolescence were of "Bad ass kids", Pleasure P insulted Lil' Fizz on when his verse will ever come up next, being the band have one forth-leader overtaking the song's versus. Spectacular insulted that only B2K's children are the only ones singing. B2K rebutted later to tease Pretty Ricky's song "Shorty Be Mine" was making audience sleepy and that their entourage reek of Black & Mild over in their section. Pleasure P and Spectacular called out and challenged B2K on their own song "Reason Why I Love You". Pretty Ricky playful challenged "If Lil' Fizz can sing a full verse of himself only, the audience can put a gun to their head". B2K brung out O'Ryan for Omarion's "Ice Box", to which Pretty Ricky called out for it being a solo track and not a B2K song. B2K performed their new single "Milage" which was later released the next day on June 26. Pleasure P and Omarion went round for round in solo songs.
- The Donell Jones vs Joe Verzuz was hosted by R&B singer Estelle and led the night with classics from both artist. Donell Jones brought out 702 to perform "Get It Together" in which he wrote for the group, and his background singer performed Usher's "Think of You" for which he wrote as well, Joe brought out G-Unit to perform "Wanna Get To know You" in which he was featured on as well as perform his hook from the television show Power theme song "Big Rich Town".
- The Case vs Carl Thomas Verzuz was hosted by Complex media journalist, Nedeska. The night started off with Carl Thomas winning the coin toss and performed "Can't Believe ('Emotional' remix)" while Case followed with "Not Your Friend". R&B artist Danny Boy participated as background singer for Case. Case performed "Beauty", a song he wrote for the R&B group Dru Hill, Nokio of the group made an appearance to share the stage with case performing the chorus. Carl Thomas introduced and performed "The World Is Filled" along with special guest Too Short in which Thomas expressed he wrote part of the song in high school during study hall and upon getting caught by the teacher, he was sent to detention. RL of the R&B group Next made a guest appearance to perform "The Best Man I Can Be" alongside Case. Nokio returned on stage to help introduce "How Can I Love U 2nite" a song Case wrote for Nokio's bandmate Sisqó. Carl Thomas ended his set with a wardrobe change choice to wear a turtleneck sweater of what he has been known to wear in the past and teases the moment of the infamous 'turtleneck' viral moment from the Tank vs Tyrese Verzuz, then proceeds to perform his chart topping hit song "I Wish". Case wrapped up his set energetically performing his chart topping hit "Missing You" with Carl Thomas joining him on stage dancing in full celebration.

== The NFL Pro Bowl Verzuz ==
=== Future potential battles ===
Upcoming line-ups that have been recently revealed and considered in a full facetime conversation with Timbaland & Swizz Beatz in late 2020. Among those discussed was a potential battle of Destiny's Child vs TLC. The series would most likely explore other cultures of music, touching on Gospel, Latin, African & Soca sound clash, but it may only take place if artists follow the new guideline of rules and regulations and agree to participate.

On January 15, 2021, Verzuz announced to partner with the NFL for a 4-day special presentation event, "The NFL Pro Bowl Verzuz", where NFL stars go head to head for 10 rounds showcasing their best on and off-field highlights from the 2020 season and fans get to judge who had the better plays. The event was aired during the dates of January 26 until the 29th on the Verzuz Instagram account live feed as well as NFL on YouTube live feed. The presentation was presented by Verizon. Deion Sanders, Maurice Jones-Drew and MJ Acosta-Ruiz served as the host with special guests who appeared to provide support for the players.

The NFL Verzuz Special Presentation
| Date | Lineup/Match | Position | Guest Appearances / Supporters |
|---|---|---|---|
| January 26, 2021 | Justin Jefferson vs A. J. Brown | Wide receiver | Will Compton Desi Banks (Comedian/Actor) Ha Ha Davis (Comedian) |
| January 27, 2021 | Cam Jordan vs Myles Garrett | Defensive end | Mark Ingram II Jeremy Medina |
| January 27, 2021 | Jamal Adams vs Budda Baker | Safety | Shaq Thompson Town Jimmerson (UNT, Quarterback) Deo Trotter Jamir Rodriguez (Herbon High School '14 Safety) Bryan Lockhart |
| January 28, 2021 | DeAndre Hopkins vs Jalen Ramsey | Wide receiver & Cornerback | |
| January 29, 2021 | Deshaun Watson vs Michael Vick | Quarterback | Willie Colon Quincy Avery (Coach, Quincy Avery Quarterback Academy) |

Highlight moments:

- The Justin Jefferson vs A.J. Brown Verzuz rounds consisted of different highlights including Sideline Catch, Touchdown Celebration, Touchdown catch, Best Dressed, Best Routes, College Football Play, Run After Catch Play and others. Favorable quotes during the presentation were: "I had more yards my rookie year., A.J. didn't have as many yards I had my first year....I had better touchdown dances" -Justin Jefferson. "I got more plays than Tyler Perry!" - Deion Sanders. "Drink Yo' Wine...Take a sip!!!" (to A.J. Brown)- Desi Banks.
- The Cam Jordan vs Myles Garrett Verzuz notable moments came from Mark Ingram II who provided high energy as the 'hype man' for Cam Jordan. Some highlights included, spin cycles, 4th and goal stops, among others.
- The Jamal Adams vs Budda Baker Verzuz came across technical issues to display a few of Bakers' highlights in which couldn't be played during the presentation. Both challengers were praised by the hosts for their smooth outfits they worn stating "they look like they came from Power Book I, not Book II... and get pedicures".
- The DeAndre Hopkins vs Jalen Ramsey Verzuz highlighted the challengers first touchdowns, playoff game highlights, best trash talk, best dressed, high school and college play highlights among many other highlights.
- The Deshaun Watson vs Michael Vick Verzuz displayed a few highlights including rookie and college year highlights, first and second plays, best dressed, precision passes, playoff highlights, quarterback scrambles, hot mic moments, game winning drives and their personal favorite plays.

== R.S.V.P. ==
R.S.V.P.
- Origin: Los Angeles, California
- Genres: R&B, hip hop
- Years active: 2022–present
- Label: Independent Label
- Spinoff of: Verzuz (Collaborative supergroup) Season 2, Ep. 22 "Omarion vs Mario"
- Members: Ray J; Sammie; Bobby V.; Pleasure P.

R.S.V.P. is an independent American R&B/Hip hop supergroup created and developed by Ray J, Bobby V, Sammie and Pleasure P after their post appearance on the Triller webcast series Verzuz in June 2022. The formation of the band came from an idea to collaborate into a singing group after making viral headlines from the event as an experiment.

=== R.S.V.P. origins and history ===
During one of the final battles of Verzuz season 2 with the headliner competitors Omarion vs Mario, the pre-battle undercard opening act between Ray J & Bobby V vs Sammie & Pleasure P created a series of viral moments between the 4 singers. The four men would then meet on Instagram live multiple days after the match to recap on their performances and tease each other boasting about their flaws and victories which led to an idea of collaborating and forming a supergroup between the solo singers naming themselves R.S.V.P. (Ray J, Sammie, Bobby V, Pleasure P).

During one of the lives, Ray J insisted that the four can create a marketing strategy from this special project adding a suggestion of pitching reality television deals with either BET (as a possible season 2 of The Encore), VH1 or Zeuz to be negotiated. However, there are no details if they reached the deal with any of those networks as of yet. The four men were in limbo deciding if the project would be a one-track collaborative effort or to record a full EP album. Sammie jokingly admitted that the band may never make it through completion of the project and success due to their playful yet ego and personalities which led to distractions to get started. The men were early criticized from many other R&B artists and others of the entertainment industry particularly Q Parker of 112 and RL of Next who watched their Verzuz battle and claimed they were misrepresenting what R&B was and stood for in the male genre and by their behavior and punctual preparedness, which led to a few rebuttals from Pleasure P, Sammie and Bobby V expressing themselves in their rants on social media. They then coined themselves "The Bad Boys of R&B" expressing that R&B doesn't always have to be 'soft' or 'crooning', particularly spoken by Pleasure P, who had responded and voiced himself against Q Parker and others who made judgements about the men involved in the full Verzuz lineup. Q Parker later apologized for his rant on video self accessing his opinion and stated it was taking out of context.

=== Project development ===
The supergroup began meeting in late July 2022 and began v-logging their progress recording music in early August, hoping to release their project in the near future. According to their social media posts, the four men shared their experience with the public of their newly found journey and expressed working together has been creative, fun, comedic and at times distractive. The RSVP project would become Verzuz first offspring independent collaborative project. According to their Instagram profile officalrsvp, the group was seen teasing their R-rated seductively infused first single "Money Everywhere" set to be released late 2022, as mentioned by Sammie in the 7-minute video post. The track hints at a sexual fantasy pleading, "Girl, let's turn this bedroom to a strip club...with money everywhere, there's money everywhere" as the main line of the chorus.

In early 2023, the group had made a brief hiatus, placing their recording and productions on pause after an unfortunate tragic circumstance surrounding Sammie personal family issues made headlines. During a live Instagram chat in a February, Pleasure P opened up honestly about releasing a healthy emotion while doing a mental health check in with all the group members hours before releasing their music video. He confessed that all members have been going through personal matters and a brief break was needed, but returning to their presence was cathartic in a sense it keeps them motivated together due to their brotherhood and collaboration . Although the start of the conversation was positive, Pleasure P addressed about getting his feelings hurt by fellow musician Tank who gave him personal constructive criticism about their first single "Money Everywhere", while Sammie and other members valued his opinion. They continued to promote their forthcoming projects which is due to be released throughout 2023.

=== Altercation between Ray J and Sammie ===
The new venture was off to a great start until an alleged physical altercation between Sammie and Ray J happened in Atlanta after leaving Magic City in late August. Ray J stated on his Instagram live video, that he fought Sammie due to his intoxicated behavior and felt bad due to Sammie not fighting back, but expressed that he had nothing but love for him. He also felt his actions led to him being verbally kicked out the group, but clarified 'we're at peace now, we good...we straight' and believed this happened because they were 'partying' too much. On a video Sammie posted as he went live on Instagram the next day, he took surprise at hearing that Ray J hit him, but clarified and stated he was too tipsy as he was reaching for the SUV door and fell, displaying his bruises from the right side of his raised cheekbone towards his eye and scarring on the same side of his face. He also acknowledged that he had no issues being a solo artist before, problems only rose since he became part of a singing group. He then stated he had support from his bandmate Pleasure P after realizing what happened the next morning. He believes they were both intoxicated, but wishes he could have fought him back. In an effort to display there was still comradery in the group and issues between the two have subsided, both were later shown on video partnering together as they were creating choreography to one of their songs. Sammie however explained in multiple media interviews months after, that the alleged altercation was misled by social media and that there actually wasn't any physical altercation at all, and that his bruised cheek was from falling out of his SUV, while Ray J joked on Instagram saying that he hit him. They both took the rumor and ran with it to create buzz.

=== Music ===
On December 1, 2022, RSVP released their debut independent single "Money Everywhere" on music streaming platforms, despite discrepancies and disagreements within the group coming to a mutual agreement when the single was to be released. Ray J, Bobby V and Sammie met live on Instagram to express concern and disagreement over the promotion of the song and production publishing rights and invited Pleasure P to join to explain his side, to which there was a discrepancy with the rollout of the release listed under his touring company. He then further expressed his frustration on his separate Instagram live assuring there were minor mistakes and made certain moves based on a business standpoint. A music video for Money Everywhere was released on February 10, 2023. A second single titled "Lay You Down" was released in late November of 2025.

==== Singles ====
| No. | Title | Writer(s) | Producer(s) | Length |
|---|---|---|---|---|
| 1. | "Money Everywhere" (2022) | Ray J; Sammie; Bobby V.; Pleasure P.; Ronnie Eric; Shurhea Mitchell; Michael Terrell Brooks; Erika Sutton; Joy Grace | Kenny Korngay; Maceo McGriff; Alexander "Alexzander ATL" Wilson | 5:34 |
| 2. | "Lay You Down" (2025) | Ray J; Sammie; Bobby V.; Pleasure P.; Demetri Fincher | Eric '88Fingaz' Parham; Darius 'Deezle' Harrison | 4:00 |

==== Music video ====
| Year | Title | Director | Notes |
|---|---|---|---|
| 2023 | Money Everywhere | Antonio Ward | Exec. Produced by: Ray J & AntonioWard / Produced by: Melinda Santiago |

=== Associated projects ===
Ray J as a solo artist, is currently releasing an upcoming visual music video album titled "Raydiation X: One Wish Anniversary Album" with a reprise intro of the hit song "One Wish" with a 60s/70s era inspired style featuring appearances from RSVP members (Sammie, Bobby Valentino & Pleasure P) as well as appearances from actors Jackie Long, Hasaan Johnson, Derrell Britt, Merci Mi, and Lil' Zane.

== Viewership & ratings ==
A total number of viewership across social media platforms was recorded and began midway Season 1 of Verzuz:

Total viewership records according to Verzuz
| Challengers | Verzuz TV Live | Apple Music viewers | Total impressions | Notes |
|---|---|---|---|---|
| Alicia Keys vs John Legend | 160,000+ | 590,000+ | 1 Billion+ | #1 Trending Topic & Various 2-11 Trends |
| Fabolous vs Jadakiss | 269,000+ | 500,000+ | 750 million+ | #1 Trending Topic & Various 2-20 Trends |
| DMX vs Snoop Dogg | 525,000+ (Concurrent Viewers) 2 million+ (Total Viewers) 26 million+ (In-Stream Likes) | 600,000+ (Concurrent Viewers) 1.4 million+ (Total Viewers) | 1.75 Billion+ | #1 Trending Topic & Various 2-30 Trends >168% Tweets from previous battle |
| Rick Ross vs 2 Chainz | 223,000+ (Concurrent Viewers) 1.2 million+ (Total Viewers) 5 million+ (In-Stream Likes) | 410,000+ (Concurrent Viewers) 800,000+ (Total Viewers) | 1 Billion+ | #1 Trending topic & Various 2-30 Trends 2nd Highest Tweeted |
| Brandy vs Monica | 1,243,000+ (Concurrent Viewers) 4.2 million+ (Total Viewers)◆ 100 million+ (In-Stream Likes) | 1.8 million+ (Total Viewers) | 5 Billion+ | #1 Trending Topic & Various 2-30 Trends 1 million+ tweets (USA-surpassed 2020 VMA's) 1.9 million+ tweets (Globally) |
| Gladys Knight vs Patti LaBelle | 612,000+ (Concurrent Viewers) 2.5 million+ (Total Viewers) 28 million+ (In-Stream Likes) | 1.2 million+ (Total Viewers) | 3 Billion+ | #1 Trending Topic & Various 2-30 Trends 2nd Highest Tweeted |
| Gucci Mane vs Jeezy | 1.8 million+ (Concurrent Viewers) 5.5 million+ (Total Viewers) 126,800,000+ (In-stream Likes) | 2.3 million+ (Total Viewers) | 7 Billion+ | #1 Trending Topic & Various 2-30 Trends 1.3 million Unofficial YouTube/Facebook Views 1.6 million+ Tweets (USA) 3.2 million+ (Globally) |
| E-40 vs Too Short | 285,000+ (Concurrent Viewers) 1.9 million+ (Total Viewers)▶ 6 million+ (In-Stream Likes) | 800,000+ (Total Viewers) | 1.2 Billion+ | #1 Trending Topic & Various 2-30 Trends 200,000 Unofficial YouTube/Facebook Views 437,000+ Tweets (Globally) 3rd Highest Tweeted |
| Ashanti vs Keyshia Cole | 1,238,000+ (Concurrent Viewers)6 million+ (Total Viewers)▲ Record Breaking 123 million+ (In-Stream Likes) | 1.6 million+ (Total Viewers) | 4.5 Billion+ | #1 Trending Topic & Various 2-30 Trends 500,000 Unofficial YouTube/Facebook Views 1,590,000+ Tweets (Globally) 2nd Highest Tweeted Gained over 11.3 On Demand total streams combined(MRC Data) |
| Omarion vs Mario | 725,000+ (Peak Concurrent views) - all platforms 5,120,000+ (total viewers) - all platforms | discontinued | N/A | #1 Trending Topic & Various 2-30 Trends 6,935,000+ Live comments across all platforms 650,000+ Tweets |
| Cash Money Record vs No Limit Records | 675,000+ (Peak Concurrent views) | 6.7 Million engagement 270 Million reach | 3.4 Billion+ | 8,491,982 Total live streams across platforms |

▲- The AshantI vs Keyshia Cole Verzuz currently holds the highest total viewers on Verzuz TV Instagram live with over 6 million views based on approximate incoming Instagram profile visitors.

▶- Followed by Gucci Mane vs Jeezy who held an accumulate of 5.5 million viewers

◆- And Brandy vs Monica who held an accumulate of 4.2 million viewers

The views are not to be confused with the concurrent estimated apex peaks during the live Instagram presentation, as number of viewers gradually gain throughout the live, and results are totaled at the end of the live with the approximate number of visitors who visited the page.

== Legal issues with Triller ==
From 2021 to 2024, Verzuz would be owned by Triller, Inc.

On August 16, 2022, Timbaland and Swizz Beatz filed a lawsuit at the Los Angeles County Superior Court against Triller, to pay over $28 million in damages, legal fees, plus applicable interest, as well as further relief that Court may deem just and proper after selling the rights of the brand Verzuz to the streaming app, which had undisclosed terms. In part of the agreement within the partnership with Triller there was a guarantee of an allocation among the 43 artists who had appeared past to present on Verzuz, that would obtain an equity share for their participation in the series.

According to the lawsuit, Swizz and Timbaland were not compensated from January 2022 in which Triller failed to make, but did agree to a settlement to be made by March 20, 2022, requiring Triller to pay them $1 million per month for the following 10 months, making $18 million in total split between the co-creators. However to date, Triller allegedly has not made any payments towards Timbaland or Swizz, which in jeopardy the owing the monetary in as 'past due'.

At the time of the press release, Triller representatives did not respond to a request for comment, however in September 2022 Swizz and Timbaland reached an amicable agreement with Triller in which the case was settled. Triller Executive Chairman Bobby Sarnevesht stated that the “Creators started this and will continue building it, this is a victorious moment in the Triller and Verzuz relationship as we march together toward the public markets.”

By June 2024, Swizz and Timbaland would reacquire Verzuz and begin a partnership with X.

== Critical response ==
Billboard magazine gave a scorecard sheet ranking the battles from least to favorable, placing the Jill Scott vs Erykah Badu battle at the number 1 spot.

The series' popularity quickly drew in many viewers as a way to cope while on quarantine during the COVID-19 pandemic, it became a vehicle for viewers to laugh, sing-a-long, dance, go back in time feeling nostalgic, watch other entertainers communicate and interact with one another through comments and replies while watching and also with each other on-screen during battle, and also it united everyone together during the crisis.

The battles are rooted to pit each artist against each other, but is done tastefully, ending in praises and celebration. One battle noted for this was the Erykah Badu vs. Jill Scott match-up, where both were classy and honored each other by complimenting their successes. It was a way to empower women.

== Awards ==
VERZUZ has won the Webby Award in the category of Special Achievement – 'Break the Internet' Award in May 2020, breaking the Instagram record for live streaming with over 750K viewers. Verzuz creators Timbaland & Swizz Beatz were the Honoree recipients of the "Shine A Light Award" shared with DJ D-Nice at the 2020 BET Awards.

Bloomberg Businessweek honored Swizz Beatz & Timbaland by listing them as one of the 50 Most Influential People: 'The People who changed global business' on December 4, 2020.

Verzuz was nominated and won in the category of Outstanding Variety Show (Series or Special) for the 52nd NAACP Image Awards, on BET.
