= Luniz discography =

- Studio albums: 4
- Extended plays: 1
- Compilation albums: 2
- Singles: 2
- Mixtapes: 1

The discography of the Luniz consists of four studio albums, two compilations and two charting singles.

== Albums ==
=== Studio albums ===
Title	Album details	Peak chart positions		Certifications
Title	Album details	US	US R&B	Certifications
Operation Stackola	Released: July 4, 1995; Label: C-Note, Noo Trybe, Virgin; Format: CD, LP, cassette, digital download	20	1	RIAA: Platinum
Lunitik Muzik	Released: November 11, 1997; Label: C-Note, Noo Trybe, Virgin; Format: CD, LP, cassette, digital download	34	8	
Silver & Black	Released: August 13, 2002; Label: Rap-A-Lot; Format: CD, cassette, digital download	—	53	
No Pressure	Released: March 30, 2018; Label: X-Ray; Format: CD, digital download	—	—	

=== Compilation albums ===
Title	Album details
Bootlegs & B-Sides	Released: February 18, 1997; Label: C-Note; Format: CD, cassette, digital download
Greatest Hits	Released: 2004; Label: C-Note; Format: CD, digital download

== Extended plays ==
Title	EP details
Formally Known as the LuniTunes	Released: 1994; Label: C-Note; Format: CD, LP, cassette

== Mixtapes ==
Title	Mixtape details
High Timez	Released: April 17, 2015; Label: Smoke-A-Lot, Numworld, Zoo; Format: CD, digital download

== Singles ==
Year	Title	Peak chart positions								Certifications	Album
Year	Title	US	US R&B	US Rap	AUS	FRA	GER	NED	UK	Certifications	Album
1995	"I Got 5 on It" (feat. Michael Marshall)	8	4	2	52	6	2	2	3	RIAA: Platinum; BPI: 2× Platinum; BVMI: Platinum; IFPI NOR: Gold; IFPI SWI: Gold; RMNZ: 3× Platinum; SNEP: Gold	Operation Stackola
1995	"Playa Hata" (feat. Teddy)	—	51	13	—	—	—	—	20		Operation Stackola
1996	"X.O."	—	—	—	—	—	—	—	—		Original Gangstas soundtrack
1997	"Jus Mee & U" (feat. Raphael Saadiq)	—	—	—	—	—	—	—	—		Lunitik Muzik
1998	"Hypnotize" (feat. Redman)	—	—	—	—	—	—	—	—		Lunitik Muzik
1998	"I Got 5 on It (Urban Takeover Remix)"	—	—	—	—	—	—	—	28		non-album single
2002	"A Piece of Me" (feat. Fat Joe)	—	—	—	—	—	—	—	—		Silver & Black
"—" denotes a recording that did not chart or was not released in that territory.
