= The Remixes (SWV EP) =

EP by SWV
- Released: May 10, 1994 (United States)
- Recorded: 1993–1994
- Length: 30:21
- Label: RCA
- Producers: Allen "Allstar" Gordon Jr., Brian Alexander Morgan, Genard Parker

SWV chronology
It's About Time (1992)	The Remixes (1994)	New Beginning (1996)

Singles from The Remixes
- 1. "Always On My Mind" Released: 1993

Professional ratings
Review scores
Source	Rating
AllMusic	2/5 stars
Entertainment Weekly	B−
Music Week	3/5 stars

The Remixes is an EP released by SWV in 1994. The EP was certified gold for selling 500,000 copies in the U.S. RIAA

== Track listing ==
1. "Anything" (featuring Wu-Tang Clan) [Old Skool Radio Version] - 4:56
2. "Right Here" [Human Nature Duet, Demolition 12" Mix] - 4:58
3. "I'm So Into You" [Allstar's Drop Check Dance Mix] - 5:51
4. "Weak" [Bam Jams Jeep Mix] - 5:00
5. "Downtown" [Jazzy Radio Mix] - 4:36
6. "You're Always On My Mind" [Radio Version with Piano] - 5:00

== Certifications ==
Region	Certification	Certified units/sales
United States (RIAA)	Gold	500,000^{^}
^{^} Shipments figures based on certification alone.
