= Tamara Johnson-George =

American singer (born 1971)

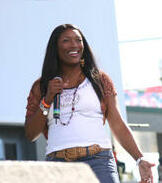
- George performing in 2005

Background information
- Also known as: T-Roni; Taj Tamara Johnson-George
- Born: Tamara Antrice Johnson; April 29, 1971 (age 55); Brooklyn, New York City, U.S.
- Genres: R&B; hip hop; new jack swing
- Occupations: Singer; rapper
- Years active: 1988–present
- Member of: SWV
- Website: tajgeorge.com

Tamara Antrice Johnson-George (née Johnson; born April 29, 1971), known professionally as Taj, is an American singer and rapper. She is best known as one-third of the R&B singing group Sisters with Voices.

== Early life and education ==
Tamara Antrice Johnson was born on April 29, 1971 in Brooklyn, New York. She is the youngest of six children. Her father died of pancreatic cancer when she was nine. Johnson-George grew up in an abusive household; her mother, who was sick with bone cancer, was beaten regularly by her drug-addicted stepfather. When Johnson-George would intervene on her mother's behalf, she was also beaten.

When Johnson-George was 14 years old, her mother died, which caused Johnson-George and her siblings to be parceled amongst several relatives; Johnson-George wound up with a cousin who molested her, adding to the physical abuse she had experienced over the years by male significant others. Johnson-George graduated from high school and attended Baruch College to study accounting, but left college due to physical abuse from her boyfriend, as well as to join singing group Sisters With Voices, better known as SWV.

== SWV ==
Johnson-George was recruited into SWV (then known as Female Edition) by Cheryl "Coko" Gamble, who would become SWV's lead singer. She was so shy that she auditioned with the lights turned off. Johnson-George was known as the background dancer/model in the music video for Big Daddy Kane's "Ain't No Half Steppin" and had a bubbly, upbeat personality. This caused friction between Johnson-George and Gamble, who felt that Taj's recognizable face and cheerful demeanor shielded her from criticism from the press.

Originally, Johnson-George was both a singer and an emcee; she can be heard rapping the bridge over the original version of Right Here and I'm So Into You, and is the primary female performer on the song Blak Pudd'n. She co-wrote a number of SWV songs, including Right Here from their debut album, It's About Time, and You're the One, which also features Gamble as a co-writer. Johnson-George ceased rapping when New Beginning was released in 1996, shortly after the end of the new jack swing era, and began to sing leads (It's All About U, Give It Up) and co-leads (Lose My Cool, Use Your Heart). The group went on to sell more than 30 million albums, making them one of the best selling girl groups of all time. Taj can be seen on the upcoming January issue of STS Entertainment And Fashion magazine.

== Post-SWV ==
After SWV officially disbanded in 1998, George was signed to a two-year contract with the Ford Modeling Agency. Shortly after this contract ended, George began dating Tennessee Titans running back Eddie George, whom she'd met at a shopping mall in 1994. George contributed to the anthology Souls of My Sisters: Black Women Break Their Silence, Tell Their Stories and Heal Their Spirits, which was published in 2000.

In 2002, George enrolled in Belmont University in Nashville, earning a Bachelor of Business Administration in May 2004. The following month, Johnson married Eddie George in Rockleigh, New Jersey, thus adding his name to hers. Their son, Eriq Michael George, was born in 2005 after a difficult pregnancy that left George bedridden for the first five months of her pregnancy. George is stepmother to Eddie's son, Jaire David, whom she refers to as her oldest son, and the godmother of Coko's oldest son, Jazz.

Along with Katrina Chambers, George wrote the book Player hateHER: How to Avoid the Beat Down and Live in a Drama-Free World in 2007. That same year, George and husband Eddie George starred in the reality TV show I Married a Baller, which depicted five weeks in the George household over a course of nine shows. The show focused on George and her marriage to Eddie George, her struggle to lose her "baby weight," and performing with SWV, who came together to perform the theme song of the show. Baller also highlighted Visions with Infinite Possibilities, the Georges' not-for-profit charity for survivors of domestic violence and their children.

== Survivor ==
George was recruited to Survivor after answering a casting call specifically looking for an NFL wife. Prior to casting, George had never watched Survivor and could neither swim nor fish. However, she turned out to be one of the strongest competitors of the season and came in second to J.T. Thomas in the fan favorite vote. Despite letting it be known that she was married to Eddie George, blowing up at her tribe mates and locking horns with Survivor host Jeff Probst, George was one of only four Jalapao members (out of eight), as well as the only woman from her tribe, to make it to the merge. In the final episode, George was blindsided by her tribe, coming in fourth and becoming the sixth member of the jury. In the end she voted for J.T., who won in a unanimous 7–0 vote, against Stephen Fishbach.
