= Kenny Ortiz =

- Born: Kenneth Ortiz; November 10
- Origin: New York, NY, United States
- Occupations: Record executive, producer, songwriter, A&R
- Years active: 1989 -present
- Labels: RCA Records, Arista Records, Columbia Records, Epic Records

Kenneth "Kenny O" Ortiz (born November 10) is an American Grammy-nominated record executive, A&R, manager, consultant, radio and street promotion. As the CEO of World Trade Entertainment his efforts have resulted in 175 million records sold. Hits and acts Ortiz has been a part of, have been instrumental in the careers and successes of Pharrell Williams and The Neptunes, Rodney Jerkins, SWV ("Human Nature Remix" and "Downtown"), Ne-Yo, Jazmine Sullivan, Missy Elliott, Timbaland. The 2019 Jordan Peele movie Us features "I Got 5 On It" by Luniz, featuring Michael Marshall, produced by Tone Capone, whom he managed.

Widely known as the mastermind behind SWV, Ortiz is also known for discovering Pharrell Williams and Chad Hugo also known as the Neptunes, whom Ortiz signed to EMI to their first production and writing deal. Ortiz would A&R the unreleased compilation album which featured Charlie Wilson and Kelis which subsequently led to Kelis's signing. It was Kenny Ortiz's idea to make Pharrell and Chad change their production name to the Neptunes.

Ortiz's A&R and promotion skills through the 80s, 90s, 00s, and 2010s helped to bring numerous musical artists and figures across multiple genres to multi-platinum sales and fame, including Mellow Man Ace, Pharrell Williams, Neptunes, SWV, Destiny's Child, The Luniz, MC Hammer, Brian McKnight, Martha Wash, Anita Baker, Tracy Chapman, Keith Sweat, BeBe Winans, CeCe Winans, Ryan Toby of City High, Mantronix, Simply Red, The Cure, Ten Thousand Maniacs.

Ortiz is responsible for helping acts to get signed by major labels. Artists that benefited from Kenny's musical ear include: Jazmine Sullivan (whom Ortiz discovered on Showtime of The Apollo, brought her into the studio for the first time, and then introduced to her to her mentor Missy Elliott who would eventually produce her #1 singles nearly a decade later), Brian McKnight (whom Ortiz discovered utilizing his vocals for demos and eventually brought him in front of labels who signed him), "Joe" (also demo vocalist for Ortiz and was first to use him as a producer and writer as well as introduced him to the history of the R&B world, and nurtured his craft. Ortiz introduced him to Pharrell Williams). Ortiz also helped in the development of acts like: Shaffer Smith aka Ne-Yo (whom Ortiz A&R'd as a senior vice president at Columbia Records, Amerie (A&R’d her platinum album All I Have), Ryan Toby (helped him land his position in the movie Sister Act 2), Johnta Austin (discovered him, signed him to RCA Records and put him together with Pharrell Williams, and the Wu-Tang Clan received their first R&B record from Ortiz, who handpicked them to remix "Anything" by SWV which catapulted them from underground to household name.

== Media ==
Television: SWV Reunited: Season 2 (filmed Apr 10, 2014 – releasing Fall 2014) VH1's: Dreamgirls: The Making and Breaking of Girl Groups (2006) TV One's: "Unsung" for SWV and Martha Wash

In Movies As Executive Producer of Soundtracks: Tupac's Above the Rim Michael Jackson's Free Willy

Articles: Rolling Stone magazine: Feb 20, 2014

Books: "How They Made It: True Stories of How Music's Biggest Stars Went From Start To Stardom" by Dan Kimpel (2006 Hal Leonard).

- Ortiz is mentioned in the story of Brian McKnight.
