= Lunitik Muzik =

Studio album by Luniz
- Released: November 11, 1997
- Recorded: 1996–1997
- Genre: West Coast hip hop
- Length: 1:11:06
- Labels: C-Note; Noo Trybe; Virgin
- Producers: Chris Hicks (exec.); Eric L. Brooks (exec.); Bosko; Mike Dean; Quincy Jones III; Raphael Saadiq; Redman; Smoke One Productions; Tone Capone

Luniz chronology
Operation Stackola (1995)	Lunitik Muzik (1997)	Silver & Black (2002)

Professional ratings
Review scores
Source	Rating
AllMusic	4/5 stars
The Source	3.5/5 stars

Lunitik Muzik is the second studio album by American hip hop duo Luniz. It was released on November 11, 1997, through C-Note Records, Noo Trybe Records and Virgin Records. Production was handled by Tone Capone, Mike Dean, Bosko, Quincy Jones III, Raphael Saadiq, Redman and Smoke One Productions. It features guest appearances from Poppa LQ, 2 Live Crew, 3X Krazy, 8Ball & MJG, B-Legit, Brownstone, Christión, E-40, Harm, Madd Maxx, MoKenStef, Phats Bossi, Redman, Swoop G, TK Kirkland, Too Short, Val Young, DJ Thump & Mengesha. The album peaked at number 34 on the Billboard 200.

== Track listing ==
No.	Title	Producer(s)	Length
1.	"Intro" (featuring DJ Thump & Mengesha "Mystro" Francis)		1:24
2.	"Highest Niggaz in the Industry" (featuring E-40 & B-Legit)	Tone Capone; Mike Dean	4:54
3.	"Funkin' Over Nuthin'" (featuring Too Short & Harm)	Tone Capone; Mike Dean	5:33
4.	"In My Nature" (featuring 8Ball & MJG)	Smoke One Productions	5:25
5.	"Jus Mee & U" (featuring Raphael Saadiq)	Raphael Saadiq; DJ Quik (co.); G-One (co.)	4:54
6.	"Game (Interlude)" (featuring T. K. Kirkland)		1:17
7.	"My Baby Mamma"	Tone Capone	4:13
8.	"Is It Kool?" (featuring MoKenStef)	Bosko	4:35
9.	"$ad Millionaire" (featuring Brownstone)	Tone Capone	4;43
10.	"Killaz on the Payroll" (featuring Phats Bossi, Madd Maxx & Poppa LQ)	Tone Capone; Mike Dean	6:03
11.	"Phillies" (featuring Poppa LQ)	Bosko	4:40
12.	"Mobb Shit" (featuring Swoop G, 3X Krazy & Cydal)	Bosko	5:13
13.	"Y Do Thugz Die" (featuring Val Young)	Quincy Jones III	4:55
14.	"Hypnotize" (featuring Redman)	Redman	5:15
15.	"Handcuff Your Hoes"	Tone Capone; Mike Dean	3:21
16.	"20 Bluntz a Day" (featuring 2 Live Crew and Christión)	Tone Capone; Mike Dean	4:41
Total length:			1:11:06

CD only hidden track
No.	Title	Length
17.	"11 O'Clock News"

Cassette only hidden track
No.	Title	Length
17.	"Revelationz"

== Charts ==
Chart (1997)	Peak position
US Billboard 200	34
