= The World Is a Ghetto (Geto Boys song) =

Single by Geto Boys

from the album Original Gangstas (soundtrack) and The Resurrection
- B-side: "Still"
- Released: March 16, 1996
- Recorded: 1995
- Studio: Lil J's Studio, Houston, Texas
- Genre: Hip hop
- Length: 4:43
- Label: Rap-a-Lot, Noo Trybe
- Songwriter(s): Brad Jordan, Richard Shaw, William Dennis, Derrick Hunter, Gregory Hunter, Richard Buttrill, DeMarcus Porter
- Producer(s): N.O. Joe

Geto Boys singles chronology
"Straight Gangstaism" (1993)	"The World Is a Ghetto" (1996)	"Geto Fantasy" (1996)

"The World Is a Ghetto" is a single by the Geto Boys. The song appeared on the group's sixth album, The Resurrection, and was used on the Original Gangstas soundtrack.

Produced by Mike Dean and N.O. Joe, the song was the Geto Boy's first charting single with the classic line-up of Scarface, Willie D and Bushwick Bill since their 1991 breakthrough "Mind Playing Tricks on Me". To date, "The World Is a Ghetto" remains the Geto Boys' last charting single, peaking at 82 on the Billboard Hot 100.

== Single track listing ==
=== A-side ===
1. "The World Is a Ghetto" (Extra Clean Radio Edit)- 4:09
2. "The World Is a Ghetto" (Geto Clean Radio Edit)- 4:09
3. "The World Is a Ghetto" (Instrumental)- 4:09

=== B-side ===
1. "The World Is a Ghetto" (LP Version)- 4:43
2. "Still" (LP Version)- 4:33
3. "Still" (Instrumental)- 4:26

== Charts ==
Chart (1996)	Peak position
UK Dance (OCC)	21
UK Hip Hop/R&B (OCC)	11
UK Singles (OCC)	49
US Billboard Hot 100	82
US Hot R&B/Hip-Hop Songs (Billboard)	37
US Hot Rap Songs (Billboard)	12
