= Playa Hata =

Single by Luniz

from the album Operation Stackola
- Released: November 1995
- Genre: West Coast hip hop; gangsta rap; G-funk; R&B
- Length: 4:31
- Label: Virgin; C-Note; Noo Trybe
- Songwriters: Garrick Husband; Jerold Ellis; E-A-Ski; CMT; Bobby Caldwell
- Producers: E-A-Ski; CMT

Luniz singles chronology
"I Got 5 on It" (1995)	"Playa Hata" (1995)	"X.O." (1996)

Music video
- "Playa Hata" on YouTube

"Playa Hata" is a song by American West Coast hip hop duo Luniz featuring R&B singer Teddy. It was released in November 1995 through Virgin Records America, C-Note Records, and Noo Trybe as the second and final single off of the duo's debut studio album, Operation Stackola (1995). Production was handled by E-A-Ski & CMT, who used a sample of Bobby Caldwell's "What You Won't Do for Love" as well as the interpolation during the chorus of Chuckii Booker's 1992 hit "Games" and Tevin Campbell’s “Can We Talk”.

In the United States, the single reached number 51 on the Billboard Hot R&B Singles chart and number 13 on the Hot Rap Singles chart. In the United Kingdom, it peaked at number 20 on the UK singles chart, number 12 on the UK Dance Albums Chart and number 4 on the UK Hip Hop and R&B Albums Chart.

== Music video ==
The music video, released in 1995, features cameo appearances from Chris "C&H" Hicks, Dru Down, and DJ Pooh, who plays the main antagonist of the music video as the "Playa Hata".

== Track listing ==
1. "Playa Hata" (Radio Mix) (featuring Teddy)
2. "Playa Hata" (Groove Mix) (featuring 3X Krazy)
3. "Playa Hata" (Drop Zone Rub 3)
4. "Playa Hata" (Drop Zone Rub 4)
5. "Playa Hata" (Radio Mix Instrumental)
6. "Playa Hata" (Groove Mix Instrumental)

== Charts ==
Charts (1996)	Peak position
UK Singles (Official Charts)	20
UK Dance (Official Charts)	12
UK Hip Hop/R&B (Official Charts)	4
US Hot R&B/Hip-Hop Songs (Billboard)	51
US Hot Rap Songs (Billboard)	13
US Maxi-Singles Sales (Billboard)	25
