= Original Gangstas (soundtrack) =

Original Gangstas: The Soundtrack

Soundtrack album by Various artists
- Released: April 30, 1996
- Recorded: 1995–1996
- Genres: Gangsta rap; hardcore hip hop; R&B
- Length: 1:06:37
- Labels: Noo Trybe; Virgin
- Producers: Eric L. Brooks (exec.); N.O. Joe; Mike Dean; Tone Capone; Bishop "Stick" Burrell; 4D; Big Rich; Clint "Payback" Sands; Chris Stokes; Havoc; Keven "Dino" Conner; Mad Rome; Minnesota; Scarface

Singles from Original Gangstas: The Soundtrack
- 1. "The World Is a Ghetto" Released: April 16, 1996; 2. "Inner City Blues (Make Me Wanna Holler)" Released: 1996

Professional ratings
Review scores
Source	Rating
AllMusic	2.5/5 stars

Original Gangstas: The Soundtrack is the original soundtrack to Larry Cohen's 1996 action film Original Gangstas. It was released on April 30, 1996, by Noo Trybe Records and consisted primarily of hip hop music. The album peaked at number 41 on the Billboard 200 and number 8 on the Top R&B/Hip-Hop Albums chart, and featured two singles, "The World Is a Ghetto" and "Inner City Blues (Make Me Wanna Holler)".

== Track listing ==
No.	Title	Producer(s)	Length
1.	"Inner City Blues (Make Me Wanna Holler)" (performed by Ideal)	Bishop "Stick" Burrell	5:39
2.	"The World Is a Ghetto" (performed by Geto Boys & Flaj)	N.O. Joe; Mike Dean	4:41
3.	"X.O." (performed by Luniz)	N.O. Joe	4:31
4.	"On the Grind" (performed by The Click)	Tone Capone	3:56
5.	"White Chalk, Pt. 2" (performed by Junior M.A.F.I.A.)	Minnesota	4:58
6.	"How Many" (performed by N.O. Joe & 3rd Degree)	N.O. Joe	6:04
7.	"Flowamatic 9" (performed by 3X Krazy)	Tone Capone	5:16
8.	"Ain't No Fun" (performed by Keven "Dino" Conner & Teddy)	Keven "Dino" Conner; Bishop "Stick" Burrell (co.)	4:41
9.	"Rivals" (performed by Facemob & Scarface)	Scarface; Mike Dean	4:22
10.	"War's On" (performed by The Almighty RSO & Mobb Deep)	Havoc	4:19
11.	"Who Wanna Be the Villain" (performed by MC Ren)	4D	4:19
12.	"Slugs" (performed by Spice 1)	Clint "Payback" Sands	4:31
13.	"How Does It Feel" (performed by Ice-T)	Big Rich; Mad Rome	4:29
14.	"Good Stuff" (performed by Smooth)	Chris Stokes	4:51
Total length:			1:06:37
