= Operation Stackola =

Studio album by Luniz
- Released: July 4, 1995
- Studios: Pajama (Oakland, CA); Infinite (Oakland, CA)
- Genres: West Coast hip hop; mobb music; gangsta rap
- Length: 66:34
- Labels: Virgin; C-Note; Noo Trybe
- Producers: CMT; DJ Daryl; DJ Fuze; E-A-Ski; Gino Blacknell; N.O. Joe; Shock G; Terry T.; Tone Capone

Luniz chronology
Operation Stackola (1995)	Lunitik Muzik (1997)

Singles from Operation Stackola
- 1. "I Got 5 on It" Released: May 23, 1995; 2. "Playa Hata" Released: November 1995

Operation Stackola is the debut studio album by American hip hop duo Luniz. It was released on July 4, 1995, through Virgin Records, C-Note Records and Noo Trybe Records. The album was produced by DJ Fuze, N.O. Joe, Tone Capone, Shock G, DJ Daryl, E-A-Ski & CMT, Gino Blacknell, and Terry T. It features guest appearances from Dru Down, Knucklehead, Eclipse, Michael Marshall, Nik Nack, Richie Rich, Shock G and Teddy.

The album peaked at number 20 on the Billboard 200 and topped the Top R&B/Hip-Hop Albums charts. On June 20, 2000, it received a Platinum certification by the Recording Industry Association of America for selling over one million units in the United States. It also made it to number 14 on the Dutch Album Top 100, number 19 on the Swiss Hitparade, number 23 in Germany, number 37 in Sweden, number 41 on the UK Albums Chart and number 46 in Austria.

Its lead single "I Got 5 on It" became a huge hit, reaching top 10 in several countries music charts, was certified Platinum by the RIAA, BPI and BVMI and Gold by SNEP, IFPI Norway and IFPI Switzerland. The album's second single, "Playa Hata", peaked at number 20 on the UK Singles Chart, number 12 on the Dance Singles Chart and number 4 on the Hip Hop and R&B Singles Chart in the UK, number 51 on the Hot R&B/Hip-Hop Songs and number 13 on the Hot Rap Songs in the US.

== Critical reception ==
Professional ratings
Review scores
Source	Rating
AllMusic	3/5 stars
Robert Christgau	(choice cut)
Los Angeles Times	3.5/4 stars
Muzik	3/5 stars
NME	4/10
Rap Pages	7/10
RapReviews	9/10
The Source	3.5/5 stars

The Tampa Tribune opined that "the wordplay of Yukmouth and Knumskull glide over bassed-up tracks like mercury."

== Track listing ==
No.	Title	Writer(s)	Producer(s)	Length
1.	"Intro"		DJ Fuze	0:51
2.	"Put the Lead on Ya" (featuring Dru Down)	Jerold Ellis; Garrick Husband; Darnel Robinson; Anthony Gilmour	Tone Capone	5:25
3.	"I Got 5 on It" (featuring Michael Marshall)	Ellis; Husband; Gilmour; Robert Bell; Ronald Bell; Donald Boyce; George Brown; Robert Mickens; Claydes Charles Smith; Dennis Thomas; Richard Westfield; Denzil Foster; Thomas McElroy; Jay King	Tone Capone	4:13
4.	"Broke Hos"	Ellis; Husband; Gregory Jacobs	Shock G	4:11
5.	"Pimps, Playas & Hustlas" (featuring Dru Down and Richie Rich)	Ellis; Husband; Robinson; Richard Serrell; Joseph Johnson	N.O. Joe	5:02
6.	"Playa Hata" (featuring Teddy)	Ellis; Husband; Bobby Caldwell	E-A-Ski; CMT	4:31
7.	"Broke Niggaz" (featuring Knucklehead and Eklipze)	Ellis; Husband; Knuckle Head; Erick Carson; David Elliot	DJ Fuze	5:19
8.	"Operation Stackola"	Ellis; Husband; Johnson; Robinson; Serrell	N.O. Joe	4:36
9.	"5150" (featuring Shock G)	Ellis; Husband; Jacobs	Shock G	4:03
10.	"900 Blame a Nigga"	Ellis; Husband; Elliot; Jacobs	DJ Fuze; Shock G (co.); Numskull (co.)	4:18
11.	"Yellow Brick Road"	Ellis; Husband; Johnson	N.O. Joe	5:35
12.	"So Much Drama" (featuring Nic Nac)	Ellis; Husband; Terrence Butler	Terry T.	4:14
13.	"She's Just a Freak" (featuring Knucklehead)	Ellis; Husband; Knuckle Head	Gino Blacknell	4:12
14.	"Plead Guilty"	Ellis; Husband; David Reeves; Kurtis Walker; Larry Smith	DJ Daryl	4:23
15.	"I Got 5 on It" (Reprise)	Ellis; Husband; Gilmour; Bell; Bell; Boyce; Brown; Mickens; Smith; Thomas; Westfield; Foster; McElroy; King	Tone Capone	5:08
16.	"Outro"			0:33
Total length:				1:06:34

== Personnel ==
- Garrick "Numskull" Husbands – vocals, co-producer (track 10)
- Jerold "Yukmouth" Ellis – vocals
- Darnel "Dru Down" Robinson – vocals (tracks: 2, 5)
- Michael Marshall – vocals (track 3)
- Richard "Richie Rich" Serrell – vocals (track 5)
- Teddy – vocals (track 6)
- Knuckle Head – vocals (tracks: 7, 13)
- Erick "Eklipze" Carson – vocals (track 7)
- Gregory "Shock G" Jacobs – vocals (track 9), keyboards (track 4), producer (tracks: 4, 9), co-producer (track 10)
- Demetrius Nicole "Nic Nac" Lyles – vocals (track 12)
- David "DJ Fuze" Elliot – producer (tracks: 1, 7, 10)
- Anthony "Tone Capone" Gilmour – producer (tracks: 2, 3, 15)
- Joseph "N.O. Joe" Johnson – producer (tracks: 5, 8, 11)
- Shon "E-A-Ski" Adams – producer (track 6)
- Mark "CMT" Ogleton – producer (track 6)
- Terrence "Terry T." Butler – producer (track 12)
- Ellis "Gino" Blacknell – producer (track 13)
- Daryl Anderson – producer (track 14)
- Dave "D-Wiz" Evelingham – engineering
- Michael Denten – engineering
- Darrin Harris – engineering
- Tom Baker – mastering
- Eric L. Brooks – executive producer, A&R
- Accrraaa J. Pavel – executive producer, management
- Chris "C&H" Hicks – executive producer
- Jason Clark – art direction, design
- Victor Hall – photography

== Charts ==
=== Weekly charts ===
Chart (1995–96)	Peak position
Austrian Albums (Ö3 Austria)	46
Dutch Albums (Album Top 100)	14
German Albums (Offizielle Top 100)	23
Swedish Albums (Sverigetopplistan)	26
Swiss Albums (Schweizer Hitparade)	37
UK Albums (Official Charts)	41
UK R&B Albums (Official Charts)	9
US Billboard 200	20
US Top R&B/Hip-Hop Albums (Billboard)	1

=== Year-end charts ===
Chart (1995)	Position
US Billboard 200	141
US Top R&B/Hip-Hop Albums (Billboard)	37

== Certifications ==
Region	Certification	Certified units/sales
United States (RIAA)	Platinum	1,000,000^{^}
^{^} Shipments figures based on certification alone.

== See also ==
- List of Billboard number-one R&B albums of 1995
