= Anything (SWV song) =

1994 single by SWV

Single by SWV

from the album It's About Time and Above the Rim (soundtrack)
- B-side: "You're Always on My Mind"
- Released: 1994
- Length: 4:20
- Label: RCA
- Songwriter: Brian Alexander Morgan
- Producers: Brian Alexander Morgan; Allen "Allstar" Gordon (remix)

SWV singles chronology
"You're Always on My Mind" (1993)	"Anything" (1994)	"You're the One" (1996)

"Anything" is a song by American R&B vocal trio SWV from their debut studio album, It's About Time (1992), and the soundtrack to the 1994 film Above the Rim. It was written and produced by Brian Alexander Morgan.

Originally included on It's About Time, the song was later remixed by Allen "Allstar" Gordon for the Above the Rim soundtrack. This resulted in the song shifting from a slow, R&B ballad to a faster, new jack swing record (which is labelled the "Old Skool Mix") and features U-God, Ol' Dirty Bastard, and Method Man from the Wu-Tang Clan. Method Man's final verse incorporates a brief sample of Wu-Tang Clan's 1994 single "C.R.E.A.M.". Released as a single in 1994, the song became a top-20 hit on the US Billboard Hot 100, peaking at number 18 whilst also peaking at number four on the Billboard Hot R&B Singles chart, becoming the group's fifth top-40 hit on the pop charts and their sixth top-10 hit on the R&B charts. The single also found success on the UK Singles Chart, peaking at number 30, becoming the group's fifth top-40 hit.

== Critical reception ==
James Hamilton from Music Week's RM Dance Update described the song as a "EnVogue-ishly wailed jolting funky roller".

== Track listings ==
- US 7-inch single
1. "Anything" – 4:20
2. "You're Always on My Mind" – 4:36
- US 12-inch single
1. "Anything" (12-inch Old Skool version) – 5:00
2. "Anything" (Old Skool Party mix) – 5:15
3. "Anything" (Bonus) – 3:37
4. "Anything" (LP remix version featuring Joe) – 5:02
- UK CD maxi single
1. "Anything" (Old Skool mix featuring Wu-Tang Clan) – 4:57
2. "Anything" (album remix) – 5:04
3. "Anything" (Old Skool Party mix) – 5:17
4. "Anything" (album instrumental) – 5:34
- US cassette single
1. "Anything" (Old Skool radio) – 4:20
2. "Anything" (LP remix) – 5:02

== Charts ==
=== Weekly charts ===
Chart (1994)	Peak position
Australia (ARIA)	156
New Zealand (Recorded Music NZ)	49
UK Singles (Official Charts)	30
UK Dance (Music Week)	4
UK Club Chart (Music Week)	21
US Billboard Hot 100	18
US Dance Singles Sales (Billboard)	1
US Hot R&B/Hip-Hop Songs (Billboard)	4
US Rhythmic Airplay (Billboard)	4
US Cash Box Top 100	14

=== Year-end charts ===
Chart (1994)	Position
Brazil (Crowley)	83
US Billboard Hot 100	78
US Maxi-Singles Sales (Billboard)	36
