= Weak (SWV song) =

1993 single by SWV

Single by SWV

from the album It's About Time
- B-side: "I'm So into You"
- Released: April 16, 1993
- Length: 4:51 (album version); 4:21 (single version)
- Label: RCA
- Songwriter: Brian Alexander Morgan
- Producer: Brian Alexander Morgan

SWV singles chronology
"I'm So into You" (1992)	"Weak" (1993)	"Right Here/Human Nature" (1993)

Music video
- "Weak" on YouTube

"Weak" is a song by American R&B vocal trio SWV from their debut studio album, It's About Time (1992). It was written and produced by Brian Alexander Morgan, who composed the lyrics based on a young person falling in love for the first time. Inspired by his crush on singer Chanté Moore, Morgan originally wrote the song for Charlie Wilson, but he later decided to give the song to SWV. Morgan later revealed that lead singer of SWV, Coko, did not like the song and gave him attitude during the recording of the single. Coko, in turn, said that she did not like the song because she found it difficult to sing initially because the song forced her to do things she was not used to.

A partially re-recorded version of "Weak" was released in April 1993 by RCA Records as the third single from the album. It topped the US Billboard Hot 100 for two weeks in July 1993, as well as the Cash Box Top 100, and sold over one million copies domestically and was awarded a platinum certification from the Recording Industry Association of America (RIAA). It also topped the Billboard Hot R&B Singles chart for two weeks. Outside the US, the single reached number six on the New Zealand Singles Charts and number 33 on the UK Singles Chart. Billboard ranked the song at number 72 on their list of the "100 Greatest Girl Group Songs of All Time".

== Composition ==
Sheet music for the song "Weak" shows the key of D minor with a tempo of "slow groove" at 63 beats per minute.

== Critical reception ==
Pan-European magazine Music & Media described "Weak" as a "lush ballad".

== Legacy ==
"Weak" was included in Pitchfork's "53 Best R&B Songs of the '90s". In 2026, American girl group Girlset sampled the song in their single "Tweak".

== Track listings ==
- US 7-inch single

A. "Weak" (radio version) – 4:20
B. "I'm So into You" (radio version) – 4:07

- US 12-inch single

A1. "Weak" (extended radio version) – 4:54
A2. "Weak" (Down mix) – 4:30
B1. "Weak" (Bam Jam extended Jeep mix) – 6:00
B2. "Weak" (R-N-B extended mix) – 5:10

- US cassette single

A1. "Weak" (radio version) – 4:20
A2. "Weak" (R-N-B radio mix) – 4:43
B1. "Weak" (Bam Jam extended Jeep mix) – 6:00

- Australasian CD single
1. "Weak" (radio edit) – 4:20
2. "Weak" (Bam Jam Jeep mix) – 5:00
3. "Weak" (R-N-B radio mix) – 4:43
4. "Weak" (Bam Jam extended Jeep mix) – 6:00
5. "Weak" (Down mix) – 4:30
6. "Weak" (album version) – 4:51
- UK 7-inch and cassette single
1. "Weak" (R-N-B mix)
2. "Weak" (Bam Jam Jeep mix)
- UK 12-inch single

A1. "Weak" (Bam Jam extended Jeep mix)
A2. "Weak" (R-N-B mix)
B1. "SWV (In the House)"
B2. "I'm So into You" (original mix)

- UK and European CD single
1. "Weak" (R-N-B mix)
2. "Weak" (Bam Jam extended Jeep mix)
3. "SWV (In the House)"
4. "I'm So into You" (original mix)
- Japanese mini-CD single
1. "Weak" (radio edit)
2. "Weak" (R-N-B radio mix)

== Charts ==
=== Weekly charts ===
Chart (1993–1994)	Peak position
Australia (ARIA)	92
Canada Top Singles (RPM)	42
Europe (Eurochart Hot 100)	81
Europe (European Dance Radio)	20
New Zealand (Recorded Music NZ)	6
UK Singles (Official Charts)	33
UK Airplay (ERA)	87
UK Dance (Music Week)	8
US Billboard Hot 100	1
US Dance Singles Sales (Billboard)	22
US Hot R&B/Hip-Hop Songs (Billboard)	1
US Pop Airplay (Billboard)	2
US Rhythmic Airplay (Billboard)	1
US Cash Box Top 100	1

=== Year-end charts ===
Chart (1993)	Position
US Billboard Hot 100	6
US Hot R&B Singles (Billboard)	6
US Cash Box Top 100	3

=== Decade-end charts ===
Chart (1990–1999)	Position
US Billboard Hot 100	59

== Certifications ==
Region	Certification	Certified units/sales
New Zealand (RMNZ)	Platinum	30,000^{‡}
United Kingdom (BPI)	Silver	200,000^{‡}
United States (RIAA)	3× Platinum	3,000,000^{‡}
^{‡} Sales+streaming figures based on certification alone.

== Release history ==
Region	Date	Format(s)	Label(s)	Ref.
United States	April 16, 1993	7-inch vinyl; 12-inch vinyl; cassette	RCA	
United Kingdom	June 14, 1993	7-inch vinyl; 12-inch vinyl; CD; cassette	RCA	
Japan	July 21, 1993	Mini-CD	RCA	
Australia	January 31, 1994	12-inch vinyl; CD; cassette	RCA	

== See also ==
- R&B number-one hits of 1993 (USA)
- List of Hot 100 number-one singles of 1993 (U.S.)
