= Silver & Black (album) =

Studio album by Luniz
- Released: August 13, 2002
- Recorded: 2002
- Genre: West Coast hip hop
- Length: 45:24
- Label: Rap-A-Lot
- Producer: Wolverine; Mr. Lee; Felli Fell; Mark Murray; Mo' Betta; Edwin Delahoz; LT Hutton; The Platinum Bros.; Big G; Mr. Clean; Rob Lowe

Luniz chronology
Bootlegs & B-Sides (1997)	Silver & Black (2002)	Greatest Hits (2005)

Silver & Black is the third studio album by American hip hop duo Luniz. It was released on August 13, 2002 through Rap-A-Lot Records. It peaked at #53 on the Billboard Top R&B/Hip-Hop Albums chart.

== Track listing ==
No.	Title	Producer(s)	Length
1.	"Street Money" (featuring Benjilino)	Wolverine	3:46
2.	"Fuck You" (featuring C-Bo)	Mr. Lee	4:10
3.	"A Piece of Me" (featuring Fat Joe)	Felli Fell	4:30
4.	"Oakland Raiders"	Mark Murray	4:48
5.	"Fugutive (Armed & Dangerous)" (featuring Benjilino and Dru Down)	Wolverine	4:10
6.	"Big Face Escalade" (featuring Nic Nac)	Edwin Delahoz; Mo' Betta	3:37
7.	"Closer Than Close" (featuring Dru Down)	The Platinum Bros.	4:50
8.	"Issues" (featuring Devin the Dude and KB)	Mark Murray	4:56
9.	"Break Me Off" (featuring IMx and Treach)	Big G; Mr. Clean; Rob Lowe	4:12
10.	"Swang Song"	L.T. Hutton	3:50
11.	"Survey of Drugs" (hidden bonus track)		2:40

== Production ==
- Executive producer: J Prince
- Produced by Wolverine, Mr. Lee, Felli Fell, Mark Murray, [Mo' Betta & Edwin Delahoz], The Platinum Bros. and LT Hutton
