= Brian Alexander Morgan =

- Also known as: Bam
- Origin: Wichita, Kansas, United States
- Genres: R&B, House
- Years active: 1987–present
- Labels: Warner Bros. Records, Thick Recordings
- Website: www.facebook.com/brian.a.morgan.167

Brian Alexander Morgan is an American record producer from Wichita, Kansas best known for his work writing and producing with the R&B group SWV.

== Career ==
In his early 20s, Morgan recorded a demo tape with his childhood friend LaChelle Mathenia and a third member as a group called Cachet De Vois. They were discovered by Club Nouveau founding member Jay King, who got the group a recording contract with Warner Bros. Records in 1987. Morgan and Mathenia moved to Sacramento and recorded their first and only album, Personal, released in 1988. When it failed to chart, the group was dropped, but Morgan decided to stay in California and attempt a solo career. Around this time, he met and was mentored by artist and producer Robert Brookins.

After hearing of singer Martha Wash's legal action against Black Box and RCA Records for commercial appropriation, and knowing she was trying to get a record deal, Morgan wrote several tracks intended for her which were recorded as demos and sent to her through her A&R rep Kenny Ortiz. Upon hearing the songs, Wash called Morgan directly, telling him he had the "spirit of Patrick Cowley", the producer best known for working with disco legend Sylvester”. Morgan wrote and produced several songs for Wash's debut self-titled album, which established him as a successful songwriter and producer.

Before being dropped from his initial record deal, Morgan was also labelmates with singer Chanté Moore at Warner Bros. At the time, Morgan had a crush on Moore and penned the song "Weak" inspired by his feelings for her. The track, along with another track, "Right Here", were written for Charlie Wilson, one of Morgan's lifelong influences, and circulated for some years in the early 1990s as demo tracks. In 1991, producer Kenny Ortiz heard the tracks on cassette and convinced Morgan to license the tracks for his R&B girl group SWV. Morgan was brought on board to produce and write for the group's 1992 album It's About Time, which earned commercial and critical success.

In his later career, Morgan continued to write and produce songs for artists including Lalah Hathaway, Faith Evans, Coko, Usher, and Missy Elliott, among others.

Around the early 2010s, he was summoned by DJ Khalil to work on a few projects with him. Khalil's desire to work with him caused Morgan to relocate from Sacramento back to Los Angeles. Due to the move, Khalil and Morgan worked on Aloe Blacc's major label debut Lift Your Spirit.

Throughout his career, Morgan has also had a "parallel" career producing house music, with several releases on the label Thick Recordings as BAM.

In 2025, Morgan appeared on a duet with Houston, Texas Stones Throw singer Peyton on her single "Eye Love".

== Selected production credits ==
La Rue – There's Love Out There (1989)

- 2. Tell Me Something Good (produced with La Rue)
- 4. There's Love Out There (produced with Diamond Crosley and Donnie Woodruff)
- 8. You Should Know (produced with David Agent and Donnie Woodruff)

SWV – It's About Time (1992)

- 1. Anything
- 2. I'm So into You
- 3. Right Here
- 4. Weak
- 5. You're Always On My Mind
- 11. Think You're Gonna Like It
- 12. That's What I Need
- 13. SWV (In the House)

Martha Wash – Martha Wash (1993)

- 1. Someone Who Believes in You (Prelude)
- 3. Give it to You
- 5. Now That You're Gone
- 6. Things We Do for Love
- 10. Someone Who Believes in You
- 13. When It's My Heart

Lalah Hathaway – A Moment (1994)

- 1. Let Me Love You

Usher – Usher (1994)

- 5. Crazy

SWV – New Beginning (1996)

- 8. Fine Time
- 14. What's It Gonna Be
- 15. That's What I'm Here For

Somethin' for the People – Somethin' for the People (1996)

- 7. Take It Easy

SWV – Release Some Tension (1997)

- 6. Rain

Nicole – Make It Hot (1998)

- 7. Prelude (I Can't See)
- 8. I Can't See

Why Do Fools Fall In Love – Music Inspired by the Motion Picture (1998)

- 8. Mista – About You (co-produced with Missy Elliott)

Eric Benet – A Day in the Life (1999)

- 8. Dust in the Wind

Coko – Hot Coko (1999)

- 5. Bigger Than We
- 9. Everytime

Ann Nesby – Put it on Paper (2002)

- 6. Lovin' is Really My Game (produced with Steve "Silk" Hurley)

JoJo – JoJo (2004)

- 10. Weak

Kobe Honeycutt – Ghetto Thrilla (2013)

- 01. G On It (produced with DJ Khalil)

KRNDN – Everything's Nothing (2013)

- 09. Abetterbih

Faith Evans – Incomparable (2014)

- 07. Incomparable

Tamar Braxton – Calling All Lovers (2015)

- 05. Never

Drake – Views (2016)

- 02. "9" (co-producer)

Khalid – Suncity

- 08. "OTW feat. Ty Dolla $ign and 6lack (co-writer)

GIRLSET - Tweak (2026)

- 01. Tweak (single) (composer and lyricist)

== Studio album ==
- Personal (with Cachet De Vois) (Warner Bros., 1988)
