= It's About Time (SWV album) =

Studio album by SWV
- Released: October 27, 1992
- Recorded: 1991–1992
- Studios: Bam Jam; Greensweep Recording (Sacramento, California); Hillside Recording (Englewood, New Jersey); Reel Tyme Recording; Unique Recording (New York City, New York); Hit City; Home Boy Recording; Quad Recording; Quadrasonic Sound (New York City, New York); Reel Platinum (Lodi, New Jersey); Studio B (Sacramento, California)
- Genre: New jack swing
- Length: 56:20
- Label: RCA
- Producers: Donald "Dee" Bowden; Michael Brown; Sahpreem King; Brian Alexander Morgan; Gerard Parker

SWV chronology
It's About Time (1992)	The Remixes (1994)

Singles from It's About Time
- 1. "Right Here" Released: August 20, 1992; 2. "I'm So into You" Released: January 8, 1993; 3. "Weak" Released: April 16, 1993; 4. "Downtown" Released: May 24, 1993; 5. "Right Here/Human Nature" Released: July 9, 1993; 6. "You're Always On My Mind" Released: September 13, 1993; 7. "Anything" Released: 1994

It's About Time is the debut studio album by American female R&B trio SWV. It was released by RCA Records on October 27, 1992, in the United States. It earned 11 Billboard Music Award nominations and became the 16th best-selling album of 1993 in the United States, with 2,100,000 copies sold according to Nielsen SoundScan. It also earned SWV a nomination for Best New Artist at the 36th Grammy Awards. In 1996, It's About Time was certified 3× platinum, for shipping over 3,000,000 albums in the US alone.

The album spawned five hit singles with "I'm So into You", "Downtown", "Weak", a remixed version of "Right Here/Human Nature" (the latter two reached number one on the R&B singles chart, with "Weak" being their biggest and only number-one pop hit), and "You're Always on My Mind" (shortened to "Always on My Mind" for single release). A remixed version of "Anything" appeared on the soundtrack of the film Above the Rim in 1994 and was released as the final single from It's About Time. "Downtown" was also sampled in "FACET!ME" by HXG.

== Critical reception ==
Professional ratings
Review scores
Source	Rating
AllMusic	4/5 stars
Robert Christgau	(neither)
Entertainment Weekly	C−
Los Angeles Times	2/4 stars
Pitchfork	8.6/10
Rolling Stone	4/5 stars

In his retrospective review for AllMusic, editor Ron Wynn wrote that SWV's "deep, sensual harmonies, sometimes naughty lyrics and aggressive style immediately struck a responsive chord, particularly among male fans. Their CD shows their versatility, as they handled New Jack tunes, romantic ballads [...] and sassy, innuendo-laden fare [...] Their hits "Weak" and "Right Here" had the same blend of heat and vulnerability that underscore the best En Vogue material, and even though this CD was padded by remixes and repeats, it was still among the finest debuts issued in 1992." Pitchfork's Rich Juzwiak described it as "a stylish album that added a singular realness to the sound of R&B", calling the "productions [...] crisp and spacious enough to retain their freshness. There's not really a slow spot on this collection of hits and shoulda-beens". Less enthusiastic, Amy Linden from Entertainment Weekly found that "in a perfect world, folks would demand more than the ability to program a slammin' beat and hit the note. Until that day, these chirpy homegirls of SWV create and fill their own void in It’s About Time."

== Track listing ==
It's About Time track listing
No.	Title	Writer(s)	Producer(s)	Length
1.	"Anything"	Brian Alexander Morgan	Morgan	2:50
2.	"I'm So into You"	Morgan	Morgan	4:38
3.	"Right Here"	Morgan; Tamara Johnson	Morgan	4:38
4.	"Weak"	Morgan	Morgan	4:51
5.	"You're Always on My Mind"	Morgan	Morgan	5:17
6.	"Downtown"	Genard Parker; Gina "Go-Go" Gomez; Kenny Ortiz	Parker	5:12
7.	"Coming Home"	Michael Brown; Hassan Eatman; Geno Morris	Brown	4:21
8.	"Give It to Me"	Parker; Jeff Redd	Parker	4:05
9.	"Blak Pudd'n"	Sahpreem King	King	3:45
10.	"It's About Time"	Gene McFadden	Donald "Dee" Bowden	4:37
11.	"Think You're Gonna Like It"	Morgan; Cheryl Gamble; Johnson	Morgan	3:19
12.	"That's What I Need"	Morgan; Wayman Tisdale	Morgan	4:27
13.	"SWV (In The House)"	Morgan; Gamble	Morgan; DJG	3:00
14.	"Weak" (a cappella)	Morgan	Morgan	1:20

1993 re-issue bonus tracks
No.	Title	Writer(s)	Producer(s)	Length
15.	"Right Here" (Human Nature Remix)	Morgan; John Bettis; Steve Porcaro	Morgan; Allen "Allstar" Gordon; Teddy Riley	3:47
Total length:				60:09

*Initially issued without track 15, but was added to all subsequent CDs in April 1993
*Copies of the album with the catalog number BMG 66074 contain "Right Here (Vibe Mix)" (4:18), as the final track.

== Charts ==
=== Weekly charts ===
1993 weekly chart performance for It's About Time
Chart (1993)	Peak position
Australian Albums (ARIA)	74
Canada Top Albums/CDs (RPM)	19
European Top 100 Albums (Music & Media)	67
German Albums (Offizielle Top 100)	84
New Zealand Albums (RMNZ)	7
UK Albums (Official Charts)	17
US Billboard 200	8
US Heatseekers Albums (Billboard)	9
US Top R&B/Hip-Hop Albums (Billboard)	2

2026 weekly chart performance for It's About Time
Chart (2026)	Peak position
UK R&B Albums (Official Charts)	11

=== Year-end charts ===
1993 year-end chart performance for It's About Time
Chart (1993)	Position
US Billboard 200	16
US Top R&B/Hip-Hop Albums (Billboard)	7

1994 year-end chart performance for It's About Time
Chart (1994)	Position
US Top R&B/Hip-Hop Albums (Billboard)	85

== Certifications ==
Certifications for It's About Time
Region	Certification	Certified units/sales
Canada (Music Canada)	Gold	50,000^{^}
New Zealand (RMNZ)	Gold	7,500^{^}
United Kingdom (BPI)	Silver	60,000^{‡}
United States (RIAA)	3× Platinum	3,000,000^{^}
^{^} Shipments figures based on certification alone.^{‡} Sales+streaming figures based on certification alone.

== Release history ==
List of release dates, showing region, edition(s), format(s), and record label(s)
Region	Date	Edition(s)	Format(s)	Label(s)
Various	October 27, 1992	Standard	CD, cassette	RCA
Various	April 8, 1993	Reissue	CD, cassette	RCA
