= I Got 5 on It =

1995 single by Luniz

Single by Luniz

from the album Operation Stackola
- B-side: "So Much Drama"
- Released: May 23, 1995
- Genre: West Coast hip hop; Mobb music
- Length: 4:13
- Label: Noo Trybe; C-Note
- Songwriters: Garrick Husbands; Jerold Ellis; Anthony Gilmour; Robert Bell; Ronald Bell; Claydes Charles Smith; Dennis Thomas; Rick Westfield; Robert Mickens; Donald Boyce; George Brown; Denzil Foster; Thomas McElroy; Jay King; Kirk Robinson; Nathan Bell; Clifford Adams
- Producer: Tone Capone

Luniz singles chronology
"Ice Cream Man" (1994)	"I Got 5 on It" (1995)	"Playa Hata" (1995)

Music video
- "I Got 5 On It" on YouTube

"I Got 5 on It" is a song by American hip-hop duo Luniz featuring R&B singer Michael Marshall and produced by Tone Capone. It was released on May 23, 1995 by Noo Trybe and C-Note Records as the lead single from the duo's debut album, Operation Stackola. It is a drug anthem about the consumption of marijuana. The song reached number two in Germany, number three in the United Kingdom and number eight in the United States. The accompanying music video was directed by Rubin Whitmore II.

Its title and chorus refer to the practice of splitting the cost of a marijuana purchase and claiming five dollars' worth of it. The single was certified Platinum by the RIAA on October 31, 1995, and sold one million copies domestically. In 2022, Pitchfork ranked "I Got 5 on It" one of "The 250 Best Songs of the 1990s".

== Content ==
The title relates to the following lyrics:

"Kinda broke this evening, y'all, so all I got's five, I got five"

"Unless you pull out the fat, crispy five-dollar bill on the real before it's history"

"I got 5 on it, let's go half on a sack"

The track is performed by Yukmouth and Numskull, who duet about splitting the cost of a $10 bag of weed before going to a convenience store to buy Tanqueray Gin, Carlo Rossi wine, Arizona brand soft drinks, and a Swisher Sweets cigar to break down and convert into a blunt. The reprised version of the track suggests that the original 'five on it' came from a man who had prepaid Numskull for yet-undelivered cocaine.

The track samples Club Nouveau's "Why You Treat Me So Bad" (1987), Kool and the Gang's "Jungle Boogie" (1973) and Audio Two's "Top Billin'" (1987).

== Bay Ballas Remix ==
A remixed single and video were released to promote the album. The song was remixed by the original producer, Tone Capone, and features additional vocal performances by fellow Bay Area rappers Dru Down, E-40, Richie Rich, Shock G, and Spice 1.

== Critical reception ==
Heidi Siegmund Cuda from Los Angeles Times said, "On tracks like 'I Got 5 on It', the two keep their feet so close to East Oakland's rough streets they're picking the glass shards off the soles of their shoes." Simon Price from Melody Maker commented, "My, is it just me, or doesn't 'I Got 5 on It' have that Single of the Year feel about it already — a classic piece of West Coastism to follow 'Gin & Juice', 'You Know How We Do It', 'Regulate' and 'Gangsta's Paradise' [...]? Pan-European magazine Music & Media wrote, "Already a massive smash in the US, this slow rap jam, reminiscent of Warren G's 'Regulate', has all the potential to emulate that success elsewhere thanks to a sparse production and an irresistible hook."

A reviewer from Music Week gave the song a score of four out of five, describing it as "catchy US hip hop that makes use of the melody from Timex Social Club's mid-Eighties hit 'Thinkin' About Ya'. Has all the prerequisites to sell well." James Hyman from the Record Mirror Dance Update commented, "Just like Jazzy Jeff's infectious 'Summertime', another Kool & The Gang-inspired laid-back 'n' lazy rap is getting heads nodding everywhere."

Pitchfork ranked it one of "The 250 Best Songs of the 1990s" in 2022, commenting, "their lone hit, about going 50-50 on a dime bag, and on paper it's a celebration of the rituals and etiquette of social smoking. But the musky, nocturnal beat, built from a corroded sample of R&B group Club Nouveau's late '80s hit 'Why You Treat Me So Bad', turned the track into an exercise in paranoia."

== Track listings ==
- 12" single

A1. "I Got 5 on It" (clean version) – 4:13
A2. "I Got 5 on It" (instrumental) – 4:14
B1. "So Much Drama" (LP version) (street) featuring Nik Nack – 5:14
B2. "So Much Drama" (instrumental) – 5:14

- CD single (US version)
1. "I Got 5 on It" (clean short mix) – 3:59
2. "I Got 5 on It" (clean bay ballas vocal remix) featuring Dru Down, E-40, Humpty Hump (Shock G), Richie Rich, and Spice 1 – 4:12
3. "I Got 5 on It" (gumbo funk remix) remixed by N.O. Joe (4:50)
4. "I Got 5 on It" (clean weedless mix) – 4:12
- Cassette single

A1. "I Got 5 on It" (clean short mix)
A2. "I Got 5 on It" (clean bay ballas vocal remix) featuring Dru Down, E-40, Humpty Hump (Shock G), Richie Rich, and Spice 1
A3. "I Got 5 on It" (drop zone rub 1)
A4. "I Got 5 on It" (drop zone rub 2)
B1. "I Got 5 on It" (clean short mix)
B2. "I Got 5 on It" (clean bay ballas vocal remix) featuring Dru Down, E-40, Humpty Hump (Shock G), Richie Rich (2), and Spice 1
B3. "I Got 5 on It" (drop zone rub 1)
B4. "I Got 5 on It" (drop zone rub 2)

== Charts ==
=== Weekly charts ===
Chart (1995)	Peak position
Australia (ARIA)	52
Austria (Ö3 Austria Top 40)	6
Belgium (Ultratop 50 Flanders)	5
Belgium (Ultratop 50 Wallonia)	7
Denmark (IFPI)	5
Europe (Eurochart Hot 100)	6
Europe (European Dance Radio)	6
France (SNEP)	6
Germany (GfK)	2
Ireland (IRMA)	6
Israel (Israeli Singles Chart)	5
Netherlands (Dutch Top 40)	1
Netherlands (Single Top 100)	2
New Zealand (Recorded Music NZ)	24
Norway (VG-lista)	2
Scottish Singles Sales (Official Charts)	20
Sweden (Sverigetopplistan)	2
Switzerland (Schweizer Hitparade)	2
UK Singles (Official Charts)	3
UK Dance (Official Charts)	2
UK Hip Hop/R&B (Official Charts)	1
US Billboard Hot 100	8
US Hot R&B Singles (Billboard)	4
US Hot Rap Singles (Billboard)	2
US Maxi-Singles Sales (Billboard)	17
US Top 40/Rhythm-Crossover (Billboard)	15
US Cash Box Top 100	7

Chart (1998)	Peak position
UK Singles (OCC)	28

Chart (2019)	Peak position
Hungary (Single Top 40)	32

=== Year-end charts ===
Chart (1995)	Position
Germany (Media Control)	44
Sweden (Topplistan)	43
US Billboard Hot 100	36
US Hot R&B Singles (Billboard)	31
US Hot Rap Singles (Billboard)	5
US Cash Box Top 100	28

Chart (1996)	Position
Austria (Ö3 Austria Top 40)	34
Belgium (Ultratop 50 Flanders)	18
Belgium (Ultratop 50 Wallonia)	22
France (SNEP)	32
Germany (Media Control)	52
Netherlands (Dutch Top 40)	28
Netherlands (Single Top 100)	32
Norway (VG-lista)	20
Sweden (Topplistan)	58
Switzerland (Schweizer Hitparade)	22
UK Singles (OCC)	47

== Certifications ==
Region	Certification	Certified units/sales
France (SNEP)	Gold	250,000^{*}
Germany (BVMI)	Platinum	500,000^{^}
New Zealand (RMNZ)	3× Platinum	90,000^{‡}
Norway (IFPI Norway)	Gold	5,000^{*}
Switzerland (IFPI Switzerland)	Gold	25,000^{^}
United Kingdom (BPI) Sales since 2009	2× Platinum	1,200,000^{‡}
United States (RIAA)	Platinum	1,000,000
^{*} Sales figures based on certification alone.^{^} Shipments figures based on certification alone.^{‡} Sales+streaming figures based on certification alone.

== Release history ==
Region	Date	Format(s)	Label(s)	Ref.
United States	May 23, 1995	—N/a	Noo Trybe; C-Note	
United States	June 27, 1995	Rhythmic contemporary radio	Noo Trybe; C-Note	
United Kingdom	February 5, 1996	12-inch vinyl; CD; cassette	Virgin; Noo Trybe; C-Note	

== In popular culture ==
The original song and a suspenseful orchestrated remix version play a crucial role in Jordan Peele's 2019 horror film Us. The track's main melody is used as a leitmotif during the film's climax. The remix is listed on the official soundtrack as the "Tethered Mix". It is featured in the films Havoc and The Last Black Man in San Francisco, as well as the video game Grand Theft Auto V. New York Mets third baseman David Wright had the song as his walk-up music for most of his career, as he wore number 5 for the team.

== See also ==
- List of Dutch Top 40 number-one singles of 1996
