= Right Here (SWV song) =

1992 single by SWV

Single by SWV

from the album It's About Time
- Released: August 20, 1992
- Genre: New jack swing
- Length: 4:38
- Label: RCA
- Songwriters: Brian Alexander Morgan; Tamara "Taj" Johnson
- Producer: Brian Alexander Morgan

SWV singles chronology
"Right Here" (1992)	"I'm So into You" (1993)

"Right Here" (Human Nature remix)

Single by SWV

from the album It's About Time and Free Willy: Original Motion Picture Soundtrack
- A-side: "Downtown"
- Released: July 9, 1993
- Genre: R&B; hip-hop soul
- Length: 3:47
- Label: RCA
- Songwriters: Brian Alexander Morgan; Steve Porcaro; John Bettis
- Producers: Brian Alexander Morgan; Allen "Allstar" Gordon; Teddy Riley

SWV singles chronology
"Downtown" (1993)	"Right Here" (Human Nature remix) (1993)	"You're Always on My Mind" (1993)

Music video
- "Right Here" (Human Nature remix) on YouTube

"Right Here" is a song by American R&B girl group SWV. Their debut single, it was released on August 20, 1992, by RCA Records as the lead single from their first album, It's About Time (1992). The song was written by Brian Alexander Morgan, who also produced it, with group member Tamara "Taj" Johnson contributing a rap.

A remixed version, referred to as the "Human Nature" remix and based on Michael Jackson's 1982 song "Human Nature", was released in July 1993. This version, produced by Teddy Riley, was released as a double A-side with "Downtown" in the United States and New Zealand. The remix peaked at number two on the US Billboard Hot 100, selling 1,000,000 copies and earning a platinum certification from the Recording Industry Association of America (RIAA). It was also a number-one hit in Zimbabwe and entered the top 10 in Ireland, Israel, New Zealand, and the United Kingdom. The music video for the song was directed by Lionel C. Martin, featuring SWV riding horses and fishing.

In 2003, Q Magazine ranked the Human Nature remix of the song at number 651 in their list of the "1001 Best Songs Ever" and in 2017, Billboard magazine named it number 17 on their list of "100 Greatest Girl Group Songs of All Time".

== Original and remixed song ==
The original version of "Right Here" was released in August 1992. It peaked at number eight on the US Billboard Hot R&B Singles chart. Group member Tamara "Taj" Johnson wrote and performed the bridge to the original song, which would result in her first (of many) co-writing credits on SWV songs.

The Human Nature remix done by Allen "Allstar" Gordon (and credited to Teddy Riley) samples Michael Jackson's 1982 hit "Human Nature". The group revealed in a 2014 interview that they initially did not like Teddy Riley's Human Nature remix because they felt it was too boring and would not be a hit. The remix spent seven weeks at number one on the Billboard Hot R&B Singles chart, as well as three weeks atop the Rhythmic Top 40 chart. It became one of the longest running number-one R&B singles of 1993. It also peaked at number two on the Billboard Hot 100 chart." It also reached the top ten in Europe, including the United Kingdom, where it peaked at number three in September 1993.

The remix appears on the soundtrack and in the film Free Willy (1993). The first verse of the Human Nature remix varies slightly from the original version, and the rapped bridge is omitted. The remix also features a young Pharrell Williams chanting "S..., Double, U... To The V!" during the song. This became a common "call" during the group's concerts.

The remix was later remixed again for SWV's EP The Remixes as a more obvious mash-up with the song's sample, "Human Nature" by Michael Jackson, whose vocals are featured in the remixed duet. The Human Nature remix has also been sampled by the late rapper 2Pac on the track "Thug Nature" from Too Gangsta for Radio (2001). R&B singer Chris Brown's song "She Ain't You" (2011) samples Michael Jackson's "Human Nature" and a portion of SWV's remixed version. Human Nature was also sampled by Nas in the hit song "It Ain't Hard to Tell" on his debut album Illmatic (1994).

== Critical reception ==
Larry Flick from Billboard magazine felt the original version of "Right Here" has a "rigid funk/R&B beat-bottom" that "marks an intriguing contrast to loose, personality-driven vocals" by Cheryl Gamble, and remarked that she is further supported by "En Vogue-style backing vocals and a sassy rap break" by Tamara Johnson. An editor from Complex described the Human Nature remix as "pure genius." Alan Jones from Music Week gave it four out of five, noting that "this widely-bootlegged melding of a track" is released with Michael Jackson's blessing. He added, "The samples of his emoting transforms what was a fairly ordinary track into a genuine chart contender. The girls warble effectively and pleasingly, and can only benefit from the association."

Mark Kinchen for the Record Mirror Dance Update wrote, "This is one of the best female vocal tracks I have heard for a long time — mostly because of the trio's unique vocal style. Producer Brian Alexander Morgan outdid himself on this." Tony Cross from Smash Hits gave the remix a score of four out of five, stating that Jackson's "Human Nature" "is the perfect vehicle for their high harmonies and they have turned his old choirboy rendition into something with much more sass and soul. It's a welcome revival of a good tune. And they've done it even better than Michael did!" Charles Aaron from Spin noted the 1993 remix as a "total radio swoon and uncanny appropriation that lets you enjoy Michael Jackson in a way not heard since, say, "O.P.P." Thank Teddy Riley for the remix, but this female trio relaxes, croons, and converses so lovely, you gotta feel suave."

== Impact and legacy ==
In June 1994, "Right Here" won one of ASCAP's R&B Music Awards. In 2003, Q Magazine ranked the Human Nature remix of the song at number 651 in their list of the "1001 Best Songs Ever". In 2012, Complex placed it at number 27 in their ranking of "The Best 90s R&B Songs". In 2017, Billboard magazine named it number 17 on their list of "100 Greatest Girl Group Songs of All Time". That same year, Spin ranked the song at number 20 in their list of "The 30 Best ’90s R&B Songs".

== Music videos ==
Both versions of "Right Here" have music videos. The video to the original song begins with Coko discussing a man she likes to Taj and Lelee. It features the singers having flashbacks to boys they liked as young girls, then is brought to the present day with the women and their boyfriends. In between, the girls goof off together in a large, mirrored room. "Right Here" was the first of their videos to showcase the group's dancing skills.

The music video directed by American music video director, film director and VJ Lionel C. Martin to the remixed version begins with SWV riding horses and fishing on an island's coast, and are shown performing with a band. An alternate version of the Human Nature remix video features wildlife scenes from Free Willy along with clips of Michael Jackson from his 1992 Dangerous World Tour.

The Human Nature remix is the more recognized version of the single, and is the one that is usually performed at SWV concerts. However, the original version (complete with the rapped bridge) is occasionally performed instead.

== Personnel ==
=== Original album version ===
- Brian Alexander Morgan: songwriter, producer, keyboards, drum programming, programming, mixing engineer
- Tamara Johnson: rap
- Larry Funk, Pat Green, Nat Foster: recording engineers
- Roey Shamir, Hal Belknap: mixing engineers

=== Remix ===
- Brian Alexander Morgan: songwriter, producer
- Teddy Riley: producer credited with work, marketing purposes
- Allen "Allstar" Gordon: remixer, producer, drum programming
- Pharrell Williams: rap
- Steve Porcaro: songwriter
- John Bettis: songwriter
- Franklyn Grant: mixing engineer

== Charts ==
=== Original version ===
Chart (1992–1993)	Peak position
US Billboard Hot 100	92
US Hot R&B/Hip-Hop Songs (Billboard)	16
US Rhythmic Airplay (Billboard)	12

=== Remix ===
==== Weekly charts ====
Chart (1993–1994)	Peak position
Australia (ARIA)	20
Belgium (Ultratop 50 Flanders)	28
Canada Top Singles (RPM)	19
Canada Dance/Urban (RPM)	5
Europe (Eurochart Hot 100)	11
Europe (European Dance Radio)	2
Europe (European Hit Radio)	7
France (SNEP)	31
Germany (GfK)	33
Iceland (Íslenski Listinn Topp 40)	35
Ireland (IRMA)	10
Israel (Israeli Singles Chart)	5
Netherlands (Dutch Top 40)	14
Netherlands (Single Top 100)	16
New Zealand (Recorded Music NZ) with "Downtown"	7
Sweden (Sverigetopplistan)	21
UK Singles (Official Charts)	3
UK Airplay (Music Week)	3
UK Dance (Music Week)	1
UK Club Chart (Music Week)	2
US Billboard Hot 100 with "Downtown"	2
US Dance Singles Sales (Billboard) with "Downtown"	3
US Hot R&B/Hip-Hop Songs (Billboard) with "Downtown"	1
US Pop Airplay (Billboard)	4
US Rhythmic Airplay (Billboard)	1
US Cash Box Top 100	2
Zimbabwe (ZIMA)	1

==== Year-end charts ====
Chart (1993)	Position
Australia (ARIA)	93
Europe (Eurochart Hot 100)	97
Europe (European Dance Radio)	4
Europe (European Hit Radio)	32
Netherlands (Dutch Top 40)	87
New Zealand (RIANZ)	33
Sweden (Topplistan)	96
UK Singles (OCC)	34
UK Airplay (Music Week)	6
UK Club Chart (Music Week)	100
US Billboard Hot 100	29
US Hot R&B Singles (Billboard)	17
US Maxi-Singles Sales (Billboard)	6
US Cash Box Top 100	36

== Certifications ==
Region	Certification	Certified units/sales
Australia (ARIA)	Gold	35,000^{^}
New Zealand (RMNZ)	Platinum	30,000^{‡}
United Kingdom (BPI)	Gold	400,000^{‡}
United States (RIAA)	Platinum	1,000,000^{‡}
United States (RIAA) with "Downtown"	Gold	500,000^{^}
^{^} Shipments figures based on certification alone.^{‡} Sales+streaming figures based on certification alone.

== Release history ==
Region	Version	Date	Format(s)	Label(s)	Ref.
United States	Original version	August 20, 1992	12-inch vinyl; cassette	RCA	
United States	Human Nature remix with "Downtown"	July 9, 1993	7-inch vinyl; 12-inch vinyl; CD; cassette	RCA	
United Kingdom	Human Nature remix	August 16, 1993	7-inch vinyl; 12-inch vinyl; CD; cassette	RCA	
Australia	Human Nature remix	September 13, 1993	12-inch vinyl; CD; cassette	RCA	
Japan	Human Nature remix	October 21, 1993	Mini-CD	RCA	

== See also ==
- List of number-one R&B singles of 1993 (U.S.)
