= Noo Trybe Records =

Hip-hop music record label

- Parent company: EMI
- Founded: November 23, 1993
- Status: Inactive
- Distributor: Virgin Records America
- Genre: Hip hop
- Country of origin: United States

Noo Trybe Records is an American hip hop record label established in 1994 and operated as a sublabel of Virgin Records America. It worked with several independent hip hop labels including Rap-A-Lot Records and AWOL.

== History ==
On Tuesday, November 23, 1993, Virgin Records America announced that they would be launching a new urban record label, with the label's president being Eric L. Brooks, then Virgin America's vice president of A&R. By 1994, the label was named Noo Trybe Records.

In June 1997, the EMI Records USA division was folded into Virgin Records and Capitol. As a result, a small portion of EMI's urban roster were transferred to Noo Trybe. Other Virgin acts such as Shyheim, who signed with the label in 1993, were transferred to the new label.

In 1995, Noo Trybe released Oakland, California based duo Luniz's debut studio album, Operation Stackola, on July 4, 1995. With the success of the single Playa Hata, the album debuted and peaked in the top 20 on the Billboard 200, and ultimately achieved platinum status in America.

Rap-A-Lot's distribution was absorbed by Virgin proper in 1998, and in 1999, the label was absorbed by its parent. In 2013, the trademark was acquired by Universal Music as a result of its purchase of EMI's recorded-music business.

== Discography ==
- 1994
  - Scarface - The Diary
- 1995
  - Mad CJ Mac - True Game
  - Luniz – Operation Stackola
- 1996
  - Shyheim – The Lost Generation
  - The Almighty RSO - Doomsday: Forever RSO
  - Various artists – Original Gangstas (soundtrack)
  - Do or Die - Picture This
- 1997
  - 3X Krazy – Stackin Chips
  - Big Mike – Still Serious
  - Luniz – Lunitik Muzik
  - Rappin' 4-Tay – 4 tha Hard Way
- 1998
  - AZ – Pieces of a Man
  - Gang Starr – Moment of Truth
  - Various artists – Caught Up (soundtrack)
- 1999
  - Road Dawgs – Don't Be Saprize
  - Gang Starr - Full Clip: A Decade of Gang Starr
