= I'm So into You =

1992 single by SWV

Single by SWV

from the album It's About Time
- B-side: "SWV (In the House)"
- Released: January 8, 1993
- Genre: R&B; swingbeat
- Length: 4:38 (album version); 3:46 (single version)
- Label: RCA
- Songwriter: Brian Alexander Morgan
- Producer: Brian Alexander Morgan

SWV singles chronology
"Right Here" (1992)	"I'm So into You" (1993)	"Weak" (1993)

Music video
- "I'm So into You" on YouTube

"I'm So into You" is a song by American R&B vocal trio SWV from their debut studio album, It's About Time (1992). Written and produced by Brian Alexander Morgan, the song was released in January 1993 by RCA Records as the second single from the album. It was commercially successful, becoming their first top-10 single in the United States, peaking at number six on both the Billboard Hot 100 and Cash Box Top 100. It also reached number two on the Billboard Hot R&B Singles chart and was certified platinum by the Recording Industry Association of America (RIAA) for sales and streaming figures exceeding 1,000,000 units.

== Critical reception ==
Simon Reynolds from Melody Maker complimented the production as "amazing, an irresistibly compulsive phuture-phunk mélange of slick soul melody turbo-boosted with hip hop beats." Pan-European magazine Music & Media described it as a "poignant swingbeat tune". Andy Beevers from Music Week rated it four out of five and named it Pick of the Week in the category of Dance, writing, "This excellent single from the teenage female trio, Sisters With Voices, has been the most in-demand US import for the past couple of weeks. Its not hard to see why with its combination of tight soul harmonies and supremely funky mixes from Teddy Riley and Allen Gordon." He concluded that it "should go a long way towards establishing them as a tougher alternative to En Vogue."

== Track listings ==
- UK CD single
1. "I'm So into You" (Allstar's Drop Check Dance Mix)
2. "I'm So into You" (Allstar's 12" Drop Mix)
3. "I'm So into You" (Teddy's Extended Mix)
4. "I'm So into You" (Allstar's Drop Radio Mix)
5. "I'm So into You" (Teddy's Radio Mix)
- US CD maxi single
1. "I'm So into You" (Teddy's Radio Mix) – 4:35
2. "I'm So into You" (Teddy's Radio Mix With Rap) – 4:16
3. "I'm So into You" (Allstar's Drop Radio Mix) – 4:47
4. "I'm So into You" (Allstar's 12" Drop Mix For Radio) – 5:15
5. "I'm So into You" (Allstar's Drop Check Dance Mix) – 5:51
6. "I'm So into You" (Teddy's Extended Mix With Rap) – 5:05
7. "I'm So into You" (Teddy's Instrumental Bonus) – 5:33
8. "I'm So into You" (Radio Remix With Rap) – 4:12
- US cassette single

A1: "I'm So into You" (Original Radio Version/Video Version) – 4:07
A2: "I'm So into You" (12" Funky Club Mix) – 6:21
B1: "I'm So into You2 (The Funkstrumental Vocal Dub Mix) – 6:10
B2: "SWV (In the House)" – 3:00

== Charts ==
=== Weekly charts ===
Chart (1993)	Peak position
Australia (ARIA)	40
Canada Top Singles (RPM)	72
Canada Dance/Urban (RPM)	9
Europe (Eurochart Hot 100)	57
Europe (European Dance Radio)	6
Netherlands (Dutch Top 40 Tipparade)	6
Netherlands (Single Top 100)	45
New Zealand (Recorded Music NZ)	42
UK Singles (Official Charts)	17
UK Dance (Music Week)	1
UK Club Chart (Music Week)	16
US Billboard Hot 100	6
US Dance Singles Sales (Billboard)	4
US Hot R&B/Hip-Hop Songs (Billboard)	2
US Pop Airplay (Billboard)	12
US Rhythmic Airplay (Billboard)	2
US Cash Box Top 100	6

=== Year-end charts ===
Chart (1993)	Position
US Billboard Hot 100	20
US Hot R&B Singles (Billboard)	7
US Cash Box Top 100	17

== Certifications ==
Region	Certification	Certified units/sales
United States (RIAA)	Platinum	1,000,000^{‡}
^{‡} Sales+streaming figures based on certification alone.

== Release history ==
Region	Date	Format(s)	Label(s)	Ref.
United States	January 8, 1993	12-inch vinyl; CD; cassette	RCA	
United Kingdom	April 19, 1993	7-inch vinyl; CD; cassette	RCA	
Japan	May 21, 1993	Mini-CD	RCA	
Australia	June 7, 1993	CD; cassette	RCA	
Australia	June 21, 1993	12-inch vinyl	RCA	
