= Luniz =

American hip hop duo

- Also known as: Luniz Toons; LuniTunes
- Origin: Oakland, California, U.S.
- Genre: West Coast hip hop
- Works: Luniz discography
- Years active: 1992–2005; 2015–present
- Labels: Virgin; Noo Trybe; C-Note
- Members: Numskull; Yukmouth

Luniz (pronounced Loonies; formerly Luniz Toons and LuniTunes) is an American hip hop duo from Oakland, California, formed by West Coast rappers Numskull and Yukmouth. They were signed to Noo Trybe Records and C-Note Records, and were the flagship act for the latter.

The group is best known for their track "I Got 5 on It" (1995), an international hit known as a weed-smoking anthem.

== Discography ==
Studio albums

- Operation Stackola (1995)
- Lunitik Muzik (1997)
- Silver & Black (2002)
- No Pressure (2018)

== Filmography ==
- Original Gangstas (1996) as customers at Thelma's Café

== Awards and nominations ==
=== Grammy Award nominations ===
| Year | Category | Genre | Song | Result | Notes |
|---|---|---|---|---|---|
| 1997 | Best R&B Performance by a Duo or Group with Vocals (with Luke Cresswell, Fiona Wilkes, Carl Smith, Fraser Morrison, Everett Bradley, Mr. X, Melle Mel, Yo-Yo, Chaka Khan, Charlie Wilson, Shaquille O'Neal, Quincy Jones and Coolio) | R&B | "Stomp" | Nominated | |
