= SWV discography =

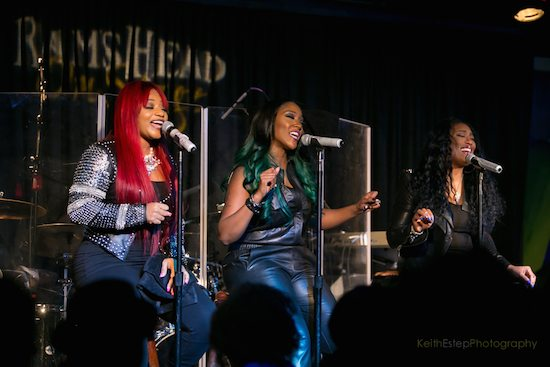
- SWV performing in 2015.
- Studio albums: 5
- Extended plays: 1
- Compilation albums: 5
- Singles: 18
- Music videos: 14

This is the discography of American female R&B trio SWV. As of 2023, SWV has sold over 5.4 million albums worldwide, and a further 6.5 million singles in the United States.

== Albums ==
=== Studio albums ===
Title	Album details	Peak chart positions										Sales	Certifications
Title	Album details	US	US R&B	AUS	CAN	GER	NLD	NZ	SWE	UK	UK R&B	Sales	Certifications
It's About Time	Released: October 27, 1992; Label: RCA; Format: CD, CS, LP	8	2	74	19	84	—	7	—	17	—	US: 2,600,000	RIAA: 3× Platinum; RMNZ: Gold; BPI: Silver
New Beginning	Released: April 23, 1996; Label: RCA; Format: CD, CS, LP	9	3	54	12	—	62	35	—	26	4	US: 706,000	RIAA: Platinum; MC: Gold
Release Some Tension	Released: July 29, 1997; Label: RCA; Format: CD, CS, LP	24	5	195	19	65	18	—	23	19	3	US: 489,000	RIAA: Gold; MC: Gold
A Special Christmas	Released: November 18, 1997; Label: RCA; Format: CD	—	85	—	—	—	—	—	—	—	—		
I Missed Us	Released: April 17, 2012; Label: Mass Appeal / E1 Music; Format: CD, download	25	6	—	—	—	—	—	—	—	—	US: 58,259	
Still	Released: February 5, 2016; Label: Mass Appeal / E1 Music; Format: CD, download	80	11	—	—	—	—	—	—	—	—		
"—" denotes releases that did not chart or were not released.

=== Compilation albums ===
- Greatest Hits (1999, RCA)
- Greatest Hits (1999, Simitar)
- Best of SWV (2001)
- Platinum & Gold Collection (2003)
- The Encore Collection (2004)
- S.O.U.L. (2011)

== Extended plays ==
Title	EP details	Peak chart positions		Certifications (sales thresholds)
Title	EP details	US	US R&B	Certifications (sales thresholds)
The Remixes	Released: May 10, 1994; Label: RCA	92	9	RIAA: Gold

== Singles ==
=== As lead artist ===
Title	Year	Peak chart positions										Certifications	Album
Title	Year	US	US R&B	AUS	CAN	FRA	GER	NLD	NZ	SWE	UK	Certifications	Album
"Right Here"	1992	92	16	—	—	—	—	—	—	—	—	RIAA: Gold	It's About Time
"You're Always on My Mind"	1992	54	8	—	—	—	—	—	35	—	—		It's About Time
"I'm So into You"	1993	6	2	40	72	—	—	45	42	—	17	RIAA: Platinum	It's About Time
"Weak"	1993	1	1	92	42	—	—	—	6	—	33	RIAA: 3× Platinum; BPI: Silver	It's About Time
"Right Here (Human Nature)"/"Downtown" (Note: "Right Here (Human Nature)" and "Downtown" were released as double A-side singles. "Downtown" was released separated as a radio-only single in the United Kingdom and peaked at number 19 on the UK Singles chart.)	1993	2	1	20	19	31	33	14	7	21	3	RIAA: Platinum; ARIA: Gold; BPI: Gold	It's About Time
"Anything"	1994	18	4	156	—	—	—	—	49	—	30		Above the Rim (soundtrack) / It's About Time
"You're the One"	1996	5	1	99	53	—	—	—	6	—	13	RIAA: Gold; RMNZ: Gold	New Beginning
"Use Your Heart"	1996	22	6	—	—	—	—	—	—	—	—		New Beginning
"It's All About U"	1996	61	32	169	—	—	—	—	46	—	36		New Beginning
"Can We" (featuring Missy Elliott)	1997	75	31	174	—	—	—	—	1	—	18	RMNZ: Gold	Booty Call (soundtrack) / Release Some Tension
"Someone" (featuring Puff Daddy)	1997	19	5	146	28	—	—	—	28	—	34	RIAA: Gold	Release Some Tension
"Lose My Cool" (featuring Redman)	1997	—	— (Note: "Lose My Cool" did not chart on the Hot R&B/Hip-Hop Songs charts, as Billboard rules at the time prevented album cuts from charting). It reached number 31 on the Hot R&B/Hip-Hop Airplay chart.)	—	—	—	—	—	—	—	—		Release Some Tension
"Rain"	1998	25	7	—	—	—	—	—	—	—	—		Release Some Tension
"Co-Sign"	2011	—	48	—	—	—	—	—	—	—	—		I Missed Us
"Love Unconditionally"	2012	—	—	—	—	—	—	—	—	—	—		I Missed Us
"All About You"	2014	—	—	—	—	—	—	—	—	—	—		I Missed Us
"Ain't No Man"	2015	—	—	—	—	—	—	—	—	—	—		Still
"MCE (Man Crush Everyday)"	2015	—	—	—	—	—	—	—	—	—	—		Still
"On Tonight"	2016	—	—	—	—	—	—	—	—	—	—		Still
"—" denotes releases that did not chart or were not released.

=== Featured singles ===
Title	Year	Artist	Peak chart positions			Album
Title	Year	Artist	US	US R&B	US Adult R&B	Album
"Tonight's the Night" (Remix)	1995	Blackstreet, Craig Mack	80	27	—	Blackstreet
"Freedom (Theme from Panther)"	1995	Various Artists	45	18	34	Panther (soundtrack)
"it's a Party" (Allstar Remix)	1996	Busta Rhymes, Zhané	—	—	—	Non-album singles
"Hey AZ"	1997	AZ	— (Note: "Hey AZ" did not enter the Billboard Hot 100, but peaked at number 17 on the Bubbling Under Hot 100 Singles chart, which acts as an extension to the Hot 100.)	50	—	Non-album singles
"Finally"	2017	Bell Biv DeVoe	—	—	18	Three Stripes

== Album appearances ==
Year	Song	Album
1994	"Anything (ALLSTAR Remix)" (featuring Wu-Tang Clan)	Above the Rim (soundtrack)
1995	"Slow Jams"	Q's Jook Joint
1996	"All Night Long"	Waiting to Exhale (soundtrack)
1996	"I'll Take You There"	NBA at 50: A Musical Celebration
1997	"Tell Me How You Want It"	Money Talks (soundtrack)
1998	"I Wanna Be Where You Are"	Hav Plenty (soundtrack)

== Music videos ==
List of music videos
Title	Year	Director(s)
"Right Here"	1992	Lionel C. Martin
"I'm So into You"	1993	Lionel C. Martin
"Weak"	1993	Lionel C. Martin
"Right Here/Human Nature"	1993	Lionel C. Martin
"Downtown"	1993	Lionel C. Martin
"You're Always on My Mind"	1993	Diane Martel
"Anything"	1994	Lionel C. Martin
"Freedom (Theme from Panther)" (with Various Artists)	1995	Antoine Fuqua
"Tonight's the Night" (with Blackstreet)	1995	Hype Williams
"You're the One"	1996	Lionel C. Martin
"Use Your Heart"	1996	Michael Martin
"It's All About U"	1997	Kevin Bray
"Can We"	1997	Jesse Vaughan
"Someone"	1997	Joseph Kahn
"Hey AZ"	1997	Michael Martin
"Lose My Cool"	1997	GZA and Chase
"Rain"	1997	Darren Grant
"Co-Sign"	2012	Derek Blanks
"Ain't No Man"	2015	Derek Blanks
