= The Winner in Me =

The Winner In Me

Studio album by Coko
- Released: July 14, 2009
- Recorded: 2008–2009
- Genre: Gospel, R&B, CCM
- Label: Light Records, Intersound Records
- Producer: Mike Clemons

Coko chronology
A Coko Christmas (2008)	The Winner In Me (2009)	Always Coko (2012)

Professional ratings
Review scores
Source	Rating
Gospelpundit.com	(Positive)
Soultracks.com	(Positive)

The Winner in Me is the second solo contemporary gospel album (fourth overall) by SWV member Coko.

== Track listing ==
1. Make a Way (featuring Canton Jones)
2. The Joy of the Lord (featuring Israel Houghton)
3. Rescue Me
4. The Winner in Me
5. May Be the Last Time
6. Let Me Go
7. Wait (featuring Youthful Praise)
8. This Is Me
9. Oh Mary (featuring Kelly Price)
10. Just Like You
11. I Surrender
12. Renew My Mind (featuring Lady Tibba)

== Charts ==
Chart (2009)	Peak position
US Top Gospel Albums (Billboard)	4
US Independent Albums (Billboard)	38
US Top R&B/Hip-Hop Albums (Billboard)	55
