= I Missed Us =

Studio album by SWV
- Released: April 17, 2012
- Studio: Various: Audio Vision Studios (Miami, Florida); The Hampton Studio and Wyatt Studio (New Jersey); Southside Studios and The Black Room (Atlanta, Georgia); Freedom Studios (Virginia Beach, Virginia)
- Length: 48:58
- Labels: Mass Appeal; eOne
- Producers: Carvin & Ivan; Michael "Big Mike" Clemons; Bryan-Michael Cox; Cainon Lamb; Ray Ray

SWV chronology
S.O.U.L. (2011)	I Missed Us (2012)	Still (2016)

Singles from I Missed Us
- 1. "Co-Sign" Released: December 15, 2011; 2. "Love Unconditionally" Released: May 8, 2012; 3. "All About You" Released: February 25, 2014

I Missed Us is the fifth studio album by American R&B group SWV. It was released by Mass Appeal Entertainment and eOne Music on April 17, 2012. The album was the trio's first studio project since their 1997 disbandment, marking the first time all three members shared lead vocal duties. Cainon Lamb produced the majority of the record, with additional contributions from Carvin & Ivan, Ray Ray, Bryan-Michael Cox, and Cheryl "Coko" Gamble's husband, drummer Michael "Big Mike" Clemons.

The album received generally positive reviews, with critics commending its nostalgic 1990s sound, Lamb's refined production, and the trio's mature, emotionally resonant songwriting, though some observed that despite these strengths and its faithful homage to the past, it was unlikely to restore SWV to the forefront of contemporary charts. Long delayed, I Missed Us debuted at number 25 on the US Billboard 200 and number six on the Top R&B/Hip-Hop Albums, but quickly fell down the charts.

I Missed Us was preceded by three singles, including lead single "Co-Sign," which became a top ten hit on the US Adult R&B Songs chart. The album also features their cover of the Patti LaBelle classic "If Only You Knew," which earned SWV a Grammy nomination in the Best Traditional R&B Performance category at the 55th awards ceremony. Despite this recognition, the group later expressed disappointment with the album's commercial underperformance, attributing it largely to virtually nonexistent promotion.

== Background ==
After disbanding in 1998 amid internal disagreements and a desire to pursue individual projects and focus on their families, SWV members Cheryl "Coko" Gamble, Tamara "Taj" George, and Leanne "Lelee" Lyons each pursued solo careers, allowing them to explore individual creative paths and mature personally and professionally. Over the following years, the trio grew apart, with Taj marrying NFL star Eddie George, Lelee overcoming depression and establishing a career at an Atlanta accounting firm, and Coko pursuing a moderately successful gospel career. In 2005, renewed interest from Japanese fans prompted the members of SWV to reconvene. Setting aside their differences, the trio embarked on a tour in Japan and continued performing thereafter, occasionally appearing alongside other New Jack Swing acts such Blackstreet and Jodeci, performing at the 2008 BET Awards 2008 with Alicia Keys, and made guest appearances on reality TV and programs such as The Mo'Nique Show.

In 2011, Mass Appeal CEO Marcus "DL" Siskind, who had produced some of the SWV's early remixes, proposed that they record new material. The trio subsequently signed a two-album deal with the independent label and began work on a new studio album, collaborating with producers Cainon Lamb, Bryan-Michael Cox, and others. Ultimately titled I Missed Us, the project became SWV's first non-holiday album in over a decade, following 1997's A Special Christmas. Drawing on nostalgia, SWV described the album as "same SWV flavor" with a contemporary twist, adding that it was the "same style just new millennium. Kick it up a notch, take it to the next level, but we're still going to be ourselves." Thematically, I Missed Us emphasized the group's renewed focus on collaboration and artistry, blending youthful energy with a more mature perspective on love and relationships. A breakaway from previous projects, on whoch Coko sung mostly lead, all members took over lead singing vocals.

== Critical reception ==
Professional ratings
Review scores
Source	Rating
About.com	3/5 stars
AllMusic	4/5 stars
Entertainment Weekly	B+
Now	4/5 Ns
Spin	8/10
USA Today	3/4 stars

I Missed Us earned generally positive reviews from music critics. Allmusic editor Andy Kellman called it "one of the best comeback albums of the last decade," noting that although the group had been absent from the studio for 15 years, the album "doesn't sound like the work of a group that went 15 years without releasing a studio album" and praised producer Lamb’s work on the first nine tracks, saying he treated the trio "as if they don't have a history and have no expectations beyond delivering a high-quality 2012 R&B album." Rich Juzwiak of Gawker echoed this, describing the record as a "nostalgic, confident comeback, full of '90s nods and 'startlingly robust' harmonies led by Coko" and commending its audacity in ignoring modern trends while remaining true to SWV’s signature sound. Spin editor Barry Walters added that "everything bright, tight and transcendent about this R&B trio's '90s hits are reprised here in high harmony style."

Steve Jones from USA Today highlighted how the updated production preserves the group's "passionate leads and sumptuous harmonies," reflecting the trio's maturity in ways that most contemporary pop misses. Similarly, Now critic Anupa Mistry described the album as a "natural next step in the canon," praising its "swooping, complex melodies, earnest ballads and sensual harmonies," even as it moves away from the New Jack Swing sound that defined their early career. Some critics offered more measured takes, with Entertainment Weekly's Mikael Wood observing that the record "probably won’t return them to the top of the charts," though he added that ’90s-style cuts like "All About You" and the Chaka Khan-sampling "Do Ya" "still get us weak in the knees." Jon Caramanica, writing for The New York Times, noted that the album leans into "early '90s nostalgia," pairing "soothing harmonies" with more emotionally mature heartbreak songs, signaling both a nod to the past and the group's artistic growth. Less impressed, Mark Edward Nero from About.com wrote: "Although I Missed Us is a nicely sung, solidly-produced album, it sounds completely out of place in — and out of touch with — the contemporary music world. Many of the songs sound like they were recorded in 2002 rather than 2012."

== Commercial performance ==
I Missed Us debuted at number 25 on the US Billboard 200 and number 6 on Billboard's Top R&B/Hip-Hop Albums chart, with first week sales of 14,000 units. It also opened at number five on the US Independent Albums chart, marking SWV's debut on the chart. While these positions were similar to those of their previous album, Release Some Tension, I Missed Us dropped quickly on the charts. Released amid what the group considered "virtually nonexistent promotion," the members later expressed disappointment with the album's commercial performance and the promotional strategy behind it. This dissatisfaction contributed to a fallout with Siskind, whom they also accused of failing to pay them for the album, although their contract with Mass Appeal required the release of a subsequent record, 2016's Still, under the label.

== Track listing ==
I Missed Us track listing
No.	Title	Writer(s)	Producer(s)	Length
1.	"Co-Sign"	Cainon Lamb; Taurian Osborn	Lamb	3:43
2.	"All About You"	Lamb; Tami L. August; Osborn	Lamb	3:41
3.	"Show Off" (featuring A.X.)	Lamb; Osborn; Raymond Gordon; Alexander Gardner	Lamb	3:45
4.	"Everything I Love"	Lamb; Gordon	Lamb; Ray Ray	3:33
5.	"Do Ya" (featuring Brianna Perry)	Lamb; Shonie Sharell Osumanu; Perry	Lamb	3:30
6.	"The Best Years"	Lamb; Anthony Randolp; Atozzio Towns	Lamb	4:56
7.	"I Missed Us"	Lamb; Osborn	Lamb	3:34
8.	"Better Than I"	Lamb; Osborn; Randolph; Zorenzo Smith; Nehemie Celestin	Lamb	3:36
9.	"Keep You Home"	Lamb; Osborn	Lamb	3:36
10.	"Time to Go"	Bryan-Michael Cox; Kevin Ross	Cox	2:44
11.	"Use Me"	Cox; Ross	Cox	3:07
12.	"Love Unconditionally"	Carvin "Ransum" Haggins; Jean Baylor; Ivan "Orthodox" Barias; Leonard Stephens	Carvin & Ivan	3:58
13.	"If Only You Knew"	Cynthia Biggs; Kenneth Gamble; Dexter Wansel	Michael "Big Mike" Clemons	5:10
Total length:				48:53

Target deluxe edition
No.	Title	Writer(s)	Producer(s)	Length
14.	"They'll Never Be"	Robert DeBarge	Clemons	4:23
15.	"Free You"	Lamb; Osborn; Gordon	Lamb; Ray Ray	4:07
16.	"Co-Sign (Remix)" (featuring Lambo)	Lamb; Osborn	Lamb	4:29
Total length:				61:52

== Personnel ==
- Ivan "Orthodox" Barias – drums and programming; keyboards
- Ivan Barias – recording engineer
- Loren Barton – recording engineer, mixing
- Jean Baylor – background vocals
- Derek Blanks – photography
- Michael "Big Mike" Clemons – drums and programming
- Nathan Clemons – bass
- Bryan-Michael Cox – drums and programming, keyboards, recording engineer, mixing
- Tony Dawsey – mastering
- Kendall Gilder – guitar
- Jason Goldstein – mixing
- Raymond Gorden – keyboards
- Carvin Haggins – recording engineer
- Allen Irvin – background vocals
- Cainon Lamb – drums and programming, keyboards
- Ken Lewis – mixing
- Sean Marlowe – art direction & design
- Tadarius McCombs – bass
- Taurian "TJ" Osborn – keyboards; bass
- Richard Reale – recording engineer
- Anthony Randolph – keyboards, guitar
- Kevin Ross – background vocals
- Marcus "DL" Siskind – mixing
- Leonard Stephens – keyboards
- Arthur "Buddy" Strong – keyboards
- SWV – background vocals
- Sam Thomas – recording engineer, mixing
- Andrew Thielk – recording engineer
- James Zaner – mixing

== Charts ==
=== Weekly charts ===
Weekly chart performance for I Missed Us
Chart (2012)	Peak position
US Billboard 200	25
US Independent Albums (Billboard)	5
US Top R&B/Hip-Hop Albums (Billboard)	6

=== Year-end charts ===
Year-end chart performance for I Missed Us
Chart (2012)	Position
US Top R&B/Hip-Hop Albums (Billboard)	90

== Release history ==
I Missed Us release history
Region	Date	Format(s)	Label	Ref(s)
Various	April 17, 2012	Digital download; CD	Mass Appeal; eOne	
