= Ain't No Man =

Ain't No Man may refer to:

- Ain't No Man (SWV song), 2015
- Ain't No Man (Dina Carroll song), 1992
- Ain't No Man, a song by The Avett Brothers from True Sadness
