= Hot Coko =

Studio album by Coko
- Released: August 10, 1999
- Studio: "B" Section (Elk Grove, California); Capitol (Hollywood, California); Electric Lady, Manhattan Center, The Hit Factory, A Room with a View, Right Track Recording, Sony Music (New York City); Studio 17 (White Plains, New York); Pacifique (North Hollywood, California); Brandon's Way Recording (Los Angeles); Vanguard (Oak Park, Michigan); Enterprise (Burbank, California); Record Plant (Hollywood, California)
- Genre: R&B; hip hop soul
- Length: 51:32
- Label: RCA; BMG
- Producer: Anthony Morgan; Bink!; Brian Alexander Morgan; Damon Thomas; John Daniels; Laney Stewart; Marc Anthony; Michael J. Powell; Missy Elliott; Rodney Jerkins

Coko chronology
Hot Coko (1999)	Grateful (2006)

Singles from Hot Coko
- 1. "Sunshine" Released: July 12, 1999; 2. "Triflin'" Released: November 1, 1999

Hot Coko is the debut solo studio album by American R&B singer Coko. It was released by RCA Records on August 10, 1999. Hot Coko served as the singer's debut effort following the release of her group SWV's third album Release Some Tension (1997), which led towards the group's first disbandment in 1998. Guest appearances on the album are made by rapper Eve and singer Tyrese. Hot Coko features production from the likes of Damon Thomas, Rodney Jerkins, Marc Anthony, Missy Elliott, Timbaland and Brian Alexander Morgan, whom Coko worked with while a member of SWV earlier in the decade.

The album debuted at number 68 on the US Billboard 200 and entered the top 20 of the US Top R&B/Hip-Hop Albums. It received generally mixed to positive reviews from music critics upon its release. Hot Coko spawned two singles that found minimal Billboard chart success, with its lead single "Sunshine", reaching the lower ranks of the US Billboard Hot 100 chart, where it reached the top seventy, becoming her sole appearance on that chart to date. Shortly after the album's underperformance on the Billboard charts, Coko departed RCA in late 1999.

== Background and recording ==
Coko first rose to prominence in the 1990s as a member of the trio SWV. Following the group's disbandment in 1998, she pursued a solo music career. In a 1999 Billboard interview, Coko said that she had been unable to record solo music due to her SWV obligations. Her debut studio album was recorded in various studios in California and New York. Coko took more creative control of her music by co-writing songs and picking producers. She co-wrote music with Rodney Jerkins who also produced songs for the album.

Although she described hip hop music as "cool", Coko identified herself as a R&B artist. She referred to the album as representing her "gospel roots" and likened her sound to Alvin and the Chipmunks with a "Coko twist". RCA executive Brett Wright believed that Coko would remain "true to her R&B roots" and cited the "urban crossover market" as her primary demographic.

== Composition and lyrics ==
Billboard's Steven J. Horowitz wrote that "Sunshine" was an "ebullient ode to a loved one". Coko dedicated the song to her then three-year-old son Lil Tracy. Produced by Jerkins, the instrumentation consists of "interlocking jerky drum loops and squelching basslines" and a "stuttering production". Noisey's David Lehmann wrote it was similar to Jenkins' other late 1990s songs. Recording the song with "multi-layered vocals", Coko sings the lyrics: "Sunshine, sunshine / You brighten up my days / I love you always". Vibe's Larry Flick likened the lyrics to a nursery rhyme, and described "Bigger Than We" and "Try-Na Come Home" as soul ballads. Flick compared Coko's vocals for "Bigger Than We" to Gladys Knight, specifically due to the song's "layer rhythm-harmony arrangement".

"Triflin'", featuring a rap verse from Eve, is an R&B song with hip hop influences and lyrics about a woman teasing her boyfriend. The hook includes: "Ghetto / Sorry / Oh no / Tired game / And that's such a shame / ... pitiful." Entertainment Weekly's Matt Diehl cited "Triflin'" and "I Ain't Feelin You" as examples of hip hop soul. Flick wrote that "I Ain't Feelin You" was a "funk anthem" and referred to "Everytime" as "smooth [and] warmly romantic". Coko recorded "If This World Were Mine", originally a 1967 single by Marvin Gaye and Tammi Terrell, as a duet with Tyrese. Flick described the cover as a slow jam. The standard edition of the album ends with "So Hard to Say Goodbye" which features backing vocals from Babyface and Kevon Edmonds.

== Reception ==
Professional ratings
Review scores
Source	Rating
AllMusic	3/5 stars
Billboard	(favorable)
Entertainment Weekly	C+
Rolling Stone	3.5/5 stars
Vibe	(favorable)

Hot Coko was released to a generally positive reception. AllMusic editor Stephen Thomas Erlewine wrote that "[Coko] isn't the most charismatic singer, but she is blessed with a strong voice that sounds very inviting when placed in the right settings." Matt Diehl from Entertainment Weekly found that Hot Coko "plays like a game of 'Name That Diva': Too often, she obliges Mary J. Blige fans with copycat vocals of their idol while faithfully replicating Faith Evans’ smooth sound. But when Coko’s flamethrower pipes cook the chocolaty-good hip-hop soul rhythms that drive ”Triflin”’ and ”I Ain’t Feeling You,” she’s not just a sister with a voice but with an attitude."

== Track listing ==
Hot Coko track listing
No.	Title	Writer(s)	Producer(s)	Length
1.	"Intro"	Shawn Carter; Trevor Job		0:40
2.	"Don't Take Your Love Away"	LaShawn Daniels; Cheryl Gamble; Fred Jerkins III; Rodney Jerkins	Jerkins	4:10
3.	"Sunshine"	Daniels; Gamble; Jerkins; Jerkins III	Jerkins	4:07
4.	"You and Me"	Daniels; Gamble; Jerkins; Jerkins III	Jerkins	4:26
5.	"Bigger Than We"	Brian Alexander Morgan	Morgan	4:37
6.	"Try-Na Come Home"	John Daniels; HIM; Turner Wilson; Gamble	John ‘Jayd’ Daniels	4:28
7.	"Triflin'" (featuring Eve)	Roosevelt Harrell III; Eve Jeffers; Morgan; Angie Slates; Trina & Tamara	Bink!; Morgan	4:47
8.	"I Ain't Feelin You"	Daniels; Gamble; Jerkins; Isaac Phillips; Jerkins III; Teena Marie (sample); Richard Rudolph (sample)	Jerkins	4:27
9.	"Everytime"	Gamble; Morgan; Lalah Hathaway	Morgan	5:07
10.	"All My Lovin'"	Daniels; Gamble; Jerkins; Jerkins III	Jerkins	5:02
11.	"If This World Were Mine" (featuring Tyrese)	Marvin Gaye	Michael J. Powell	5:21
12.	"So Hard to Say Goodbye"	Eric Jackson; Damon Thomas; J Valentine [Johnnie Newt]; Robert Newt	Thomas	4:21

European bonus track
No.	Title	Writer(s)	Producer(s)	Length
13.	"He Be Back"	Missy Elliott; Timothy Mosley	Elliott	4:52

Japanese bonus track
No.	Title	Writer(s)	Producer(s)	Length
14.	"This Ain't Love"	Laney Stewart	Stewart	4:19

== Charts ==
Chart performanc for Hot Coko
Chart (1999)	Peak position
US Billboard 200	68
US Top R&B/Hip-Hop Albums (Billboard)	14
