= Still (SWV album) =

Studio album by SWV
- Released: February 5, 2016
- Length: 36:55
- Label: Mass Appeal; eOne
- Producer: Cainon Lamb; Bigg D

SWV chronology
I Missed Us (2012)	Still (2016)

Singles from Still
- 1. "Ain't No Man" Released: August 7, 2015; 2. "MCE (Man Crush Everyday)" Released: December 15, 2015; 3. "On Tonight" Released: January 22, 2016

Still is the sixth studio album by American R&B group SWV. It was released on February 5, 2016, through Mass Appeal Entertainment and eOne Music. The album was preceded by the release of the singles, "Ain't No Man", "MCE (Man Crush Everyday)", and "On Tonight".

Still peaked at number 80 on the US Billboard 200 albums chart, number five on the US R&B Albums chart and number 11 on the Top R&B/Hip-Hop Albums chart with sales of 10,000 in its first week.

== Background and composition ==
Still is SWV's first album release in four years, following 2012's I Missed Us with a 10 track set, with 10 original songs. All songs written and produced by Cainon Lamb and Derrick "Bigg D" Baker along with co-writers Sean McMillion, Ralph Jeanty, Taurian Osborne, Ayanna Howard, Samuel "Sam Hook" Jean, Patrice Rushen, Fred Washington, Steven "Q-Beatz" Kubie, Tami Latrell, Dennis Lambert, Brian Potter, Marcus Henderson, Cortni Elisa Jordan, Shonie Osumanu, Dashon J. Vincent, Leon Huff, Kenneth Gamble and August Rigo. On the Target edition of Still, three additional live bonus tracks are added to the track listing, including their biggest hits "Right Here", "I'm So into You" and "Weak".

== Promotion ==
=== Singles ===
"Ain't No Man" was released as the album's lead single on August 7, 2015. The music video for "Ain't No Man" was released on VEVO on October 3, 2015, directed by Derek Blanks. "MCE (Man Crush Everyday)" was released as the album's second single on December 15, 2015. Fans got "MCE (Man Crush Everyday)" instantly once the album was available for pre-order. "On Tonight" was released as the third single on January 22, 2016. The song samples Patrice Rushen's single "Never Gonna Give You Up".

=== Live performances ===
SWV performed a medley of their songs "I'm So into You", "Ain't No Man" and "Weak" on the daytime talk show The View on December 12, 2015. SWV performed "Ain't No Man" in a concert at The Classic Weekend Show in Birmingham Alabama, on October 30, 2015. "MCE (Man Crush Everyday)" was performed at BB Kings, New York on January 21, 2016.

== Critical reception ==
Professional ratings
Review scores
Source	Rating
AllMusic	2.5/5 stars

Still received mixed reviews from music critics. AllMusic gave a mixed response to the album "A fair portion of Still, released almost four years [after the group's previous album], doesn't have those qualities in its favor, and the level of song quality isn't quite as high." "MCE (Man Crush Everyday)," a sparkling slow jam, is among SWV's best, while the throwback ballad "When Love Didn't Hurt" and relatively contemporary "Miss You" are close behind it. Other songs are more likely to make a listener think of SWV's catalog or songs by other artists. "Had this been SWV's 2010s return, it would have been adequate, but it's a lengthy backward stride from I Missed Us." SoulTracks gave a mixed response to the album "The cover displays three close and confident women, glammed up to the gods and hitting their strides as individuals and artists. What isn't so apparent, however, is the breakneck speed in which the music came together—one whole week. Conceived to coincide with the heightened profile of the previous reality show, Still follows the arc of their 2012 release, except there's more lead vocal sharing this time around. Taj's throaty contributions are the most distinctive of the two, prominent on the come-hither mid-tempo, "Let's Make Music," and the roller-skate-ready groove "On Tonight." LeLee's is more subdued in tone, but just as affecting on the nostalgic bluesy turn of a ballad, "When Love Didn't Hurt."

== Commercial performance ==
Still debuted at number 80 on the US Billboard 200, number 5 on the Billboard R&B Albums Chart and number 11 on the Top R&B/Hip-Hop Albums chart with first week sales of 10,000 units.

== Track listing ==
Still track listing
No.	Title	Writer(s)	Producer(s)	Length
1.	"Still"	Derrick "Bigg D" Baker; Ralph Jeanty; Cainon Lamb; Sean McMillion; Taurian Osborne	Bigg D; Cainon Lamb	3:30
2.	"MCE (Man Crush Everyday)"	Bigg D; Lamb; Osborne	Bigg D; Lamb	3:55
3.	"On Tonight"	Bigg D; Ayanna Howard; Samuel "Sam Hook" Jean; Lamb; Osborne; Patrice Rushen; Fred Washington	Bigg D; Lamb	3:05
4.	"Let's Make Music"	Bigg D; Steven "Q-Beatz" Kubie; Lamb; Tami Latrell	Bigg D; Lamb	3:40
5.	"Ain't No Man"	Bigg D; Ayanna Howard; Lamb; Dennis Lambert; Brian Potter	Bigg D; Lamb	3:34
6.	"Love Song"	Bigg D; Steven "Q-Beatz" Kubie; Marcus Henderson; Cortni Elisa Jordan; Lamb; Shonie Osumanu; Dashon J. Vincent	Bigg D; Lamb	3:50
7.	"When Love Didn't Hurt"	Bigg D; Howard; Lamb; Osborne	Bigg D; Lamb	4:39
8.	"Miss You"	Bigg D; Kenneth Gamble; Ayanna Howard; Leon Huff; Steven "Q-Beatz" Kubie; Lamb	Bigg D; Lamb	3:23
9.	"Leaving You Alone"	Bigg D; Jordan; Steven "Q-Beatz" Kubie; Lamb	Bigg D; Lamb	3:29
10.	"What We Gon' Do"	Bigg D; Lamb; August Rigo	Bigg D; Lamb	3:50
Total length:				36:55

Japanese and Target edition
No.	Title	Writer(s)	Producer(s)	Length
11.	"Right Here" (live)	Brian Alexander Morgan	Big Mike Clemons; Nate "Phenomenal" Clemons	1:47
12.	"I'm So into You" (live)	Morgan	Clemons; Clemons	2:10
13.	"Weak" (live)	Morgan	Clemons; Clemons	7:10
Total length:				48:08

== Personnel ==
Credits adapted from AllMusic.com

Performers and musicians

- Cheryl "Coko" Clemons – vocals, background vocals
- Tamara "Taj" Johnson-George – vocals, background vocals
- Leanne "Lelee" Lyons – vocals, background vocals

Technical

- Derrick "Bigg D" Baker – executive producer
- Cainon Lamb – executive producer
- Cheryl Clemons – executive producer
- Tamara Johnson – executive producer
- Leanne Lyons – executive producer
- Marcus Siskind "DL" – executive producer
- Michael Clemons – vocal producer, vocals
- Steven "Q-Beatz" Kubie – engineer
- Isabel Evans – A&R
- Danielle Brimm – A&R
- Derek Blanks – art direction, design, photography
- Marquis Bridges – additional production
- Kevin "KD" Davis – mixing
- Chris Gehringer – mastering
- Florian "Flo" Ongonga – engineer
- Clinton Sparks – additional production
- Julia Sutowski – coordinating producer
- Ariel Zucco – assistant engineer

== Charts ==
Weekly chart performance for Still
Chart (2016)	Peak position
US Billboard 200	80
US Independent Albums (Billboard)	4
US Top R&B/Hip-Hop Albums (Billboard)	11
