= New Beginning (SWV album) =

Studio album by SWV
- Released: April 23, 1996
- Recorded: 1994–1996
- Genre: R&B
- Length: 66:41
- Label: RCA
- Producers: Allen "Allstar" Gordon Jr.; Herb Middleton; Brian Alexander Morgan; the Neptunes; Genard Parker; Erick Sermon; Daryl Simmons; Chucky Thompson

SWV chronology
The Remixes (1994)	New Beginning (1996)	Release Some Tension (1997)

Singles from New Beginning
- 1. "You're the One" Released: March 29, 1996; 2. "Use Your Heart" Released: July 23, 1996; 3. "It's All About U" Released: November 12, 1996

New Beginning is the second studio album by American R&B female trio SWV. Their first album since their debut It's About Time (1992), the album was released by RCA Records on April 23, 1996, in the United States. The lead single, "You're the One", became one of their signature songs peaking at number five on the US Billboard Hot 100 and topped the Hot R&B Singles. The second single, "Use Your Heart", saw the debut of the producers the Neptunes. This song peaked at twenty-two on the Hot 100 and number six on the R&B chart. The last single, "It's All About U", found Taj taking most of the lead as opposed to Coko. New Beginning was certified platinum by the Recording Industry Association of America (RIAA).

== Critical reception ==
Professional ratings
Review scores
Source	Rating
AllMusic	3.5/5 stars
Billboard	(favorable)
Entertainment Weekly	B
The Guardian	4/5 stars
Rolling Stone	3.5/5 stars
The Rolling Stone Album Guide	4/5 stars

AllMusic senior editor Stephen Thomas Erlewine found that "the group does take a different approach on New Beginning, backing away from the New Jack grooves that dominated their debut and exploring a more direct, organic R&B vibe. They haven't left hip-hop behind, but they've added a new array of sonic textures that gives their music added depth. But the true strength of New Beginning is the vocal capabilities of SWV [...] There may be a couple of weak spots on the album, but the trio's considerable talents make those moments easy to forgive."

== Track listing ==
New Beginning track listing
No.	Title	Writer(s)	Producer(s)	Length
1.	"New Beginning (Interlude)"	Cheryl Gamble; Tamara Johnson; Leanne Lyons; Herb Middleton; Gordon Chambers	Middleton	1:53
2.	"You're the One"	Gamble; Johnson; Allen "Allstar" Gordon, Jr.; Ivan Matias; Andrea Martin	Gordon	4:39
3.	"Whatcha Need"	Gamble; Johnson; Gordon; Matias; Martin; Brian Alexander Morgan	Gordon	3:52
4.	"On & On" (featuring Erick Sermon)	Sermon; Matias; Martin; Leroy Burgess; James Calloway; Sonny Davenport	Sermon	3:52
5.	"It's All About U"	Gordon; Martin; Anthony Burroughs	Gordon	3:43
6.	"Use Your Heart"	Pharrell Williams; Chad Hugo	The Neptunes	4:49
7.	"Where Is the Love (Interlude)"	Herb Middleton; Gordon Chambers	Middleton	2:02
8.	"Fine Time"	Morgan; Hightower; Fowler	Morgan	4:32
9.	"Love Is So Amazin'"	Johnson; Gordon; Carl Brown; Burroughs	Gordon	5:58
10.	"Use Your Heart (Interlude)"	Middleton; Williams; Hugo	The Neptunes; Middleton^{[a]}	1:34
11.	"You Are My Love"	Daryl Simmons	Simmons	4:56
12.	"I'm So in Love"	Gamble; Genard Parker	Parker	5:27
13.	"When This Feeling"	Williams; Hugo; David Nichtern	The Neptunes	4:20
14.	"What's It Gonna Be"	Morgan	Morgan	4:32
15.	"That's What I'm Here For" (featuring Butterfly)	Morgan; Brown	Morgan	4:48
16.	"Don't Waste Your Time"	Chucky Thompson; Faith Evans; Lyons	Thompson	3:56
17.	"Soul Intact (Interlude)"	Morgan	Morgan	1:47

Notes

- ^a signifies a co-producer

== Charts ==
=== Weekly charts ===
Weekly chart performance for New Beginning
Chart (1996)	Peak position
Australian Albums (ARIA)	54
Canada Top Albums/CDs (RPM)	12
Dutch Albums (Album Top 100)	62
European Top 100 Albums (Music & Media)	78
New Zealand Albums (RMNZ)	35
UK Albums (Official Charts)	26
UK R&B Albums (Official Charts)	4
US Billboard 200	9
US Top R&B/Hip-Hop Albums (Billboard)	3

=== Year-end charts ===
Year-end chart performance for New Beginning
Chart (1996)	Position
US Billboard 200	114
US Top R&B/Hip-Hop Albums (Billboard)	32

== Certifications ==
Certifications for New Beginning
Region	Certification	Certified units/sales
Canada (Music Canada)	Gold	50,000^{^}
Japan (RIAJ)	Gold	100,000^{^}
United States (RIAA)	Platinum	1,000,000^{^}
^{^} Shipments figures based on certification alone.
