= Rain (SWV song) =

1997 single by SWV

Single by SWV

from the album Release Some Tension
- Released: February 24, 1998
- Recorded: 1997
- Studio: The B Section (Laguna Beach, California)
- Length: 4:25
- Label: RCA
- Songwriter: Brian Alexander Morgan
- Producer: Brian Alexander Morgan

SWV singles chronology
"Lose My Cool" (1997)	"Rain" (1998)	"Co-Sign" (2011)

"Rain" is a song by American R&B trio SWV. Written and produced by Brian Alexander Morgan, it was initially intended for singer Brandy's second studio album, Never Say Never (1998), before the track was ultimately recorded by SWV for their third studio album, Release Some Tension (1997).

The song was released by RCA Records in February 1998 as the album's fourth and final single. It peaked at number 25 on the US Billboard Hot 100 and number 7 on the US Hot R&B/Hip-Hop Songs chart, becoming the album's highest-charting single after "Someone" (1997). Singer and actor Tyrese Gibson appeared in the music video for "Rain," which was directed by Darren Grant.

== Background ==
In 1997, songwriter-producer Brian Alexander Morgan secured a production deal with East West Records under the leadership of Sylvia Rhone. Hoping to collaborate with Brandy, who was signed to East West’s sister label Atlantic Records, he wrote three songs intended for her second studio album, Never Say Never (1998), among them "Rain." Impressed by his work, Rhone arranged for Morgan to record the material with Brandy at Sean "Puffy" Combs' recording studio, Daddy's House, in New York City, with Kelly Price overseeing vocal production. At the time, Combs was collaborating with SWV on their third RCA Records album, Release Some Tension. Through Combs, the song came to the attention of RCA's A&R manager Anthony Morgan, who contacted Brian Alexander and urged him not to finalize the track with Brandy, expressing interest in having it recorded by SWV instead. Morgan initially declined, but ultimately agreed to proceed after receiving Rhone's approval.

== Commercial performance ==
In the United States, "Rain" achieved moderate commercial success and became the second-highest-charting single from Release Some Tension. The song peaked at number 25 on the Billboard Hot 100 and reached number seven on the Hot R&B/Hip-Hop Songs chart. It also climbed to number 19 on the Rhythmic Airplay chart. On the 1998 year-end charts, “Rain” ranked at number 54 on the Hot R&B/Hip-Hop Songs year-end chart and number 87 on the Rhythmic year-end chart.

== Music video ==
A music video for "Rain" was directed by Darren Grant. Singer and actor Tyrese Gibson appears in clip. He would later sing the hook on rapper Chingy's 2006 hit song "Pullin' Me Back", which samples "Rain".

== Cover versions ==
In July 2020, "Rain" was covered by the indie rock group Whitney on their covers album, Candid.

== Track listings ==
Maxi single
No.	Title	Writer(s)	Producer(s)	Length
1.	"Rain" (LP Version)	Brian Alexander Morgan	Morgan	4:25
2.	"Lose My Cool" (Stoney's Pump Remix) (featuring Redmann)	Malik Pendleton; Reginald Noble	Pendleton; Mary Brown^{[a]}; StoneBridge^{[b]}	6:53
3.	"Someone" (Mosso House Radio Edit) (featuring Puff Daddy)	Deric "D-Dot" Angelettie; Sean Combs; Jeremy A. Graham; Andrea Martin; Harve Pierre; Kelly Price; Todd Shaw	J Dub; Combs; Price^{[a]}; Troy Taylor^{[a]}; Max Moroldo^{[b]}; Francesco Marchetti ^{[b]}	3:47

CD single
No.	Title	Writer(s)	Producer(s)	Length
1.	"Rain" (LP Version)	Brian Alexander Morgan	Morgan	4:25
2.	"Lose Myself"	Charles Farrar; Dawn Beckman; Taylor	Farrar; Taylor	4:38

Notes

- ^{^[a]} denotes producer(s)
- ^{^[b]} denotes producer(s)

Sample credits

- "Someone (Mosso House Radio Edit)" embodies portions of "Ten Crack Commandments" and "The World Is Filled" as performed by The Notorious B.I.G.

== Credits and personnel ==
Credits lifted from the liner notes of Release Some Tension.

- Brian Alexander Morgan – keys, producer, writer
- Larry Funk – engineer
- Michael Gregory – electric bass, acoustic guitar
- Harley White – key bass

== Charts ==
=== Weekly charts ===
Weekly chart performance for "Rain"
Chart (1997–1998)	Peak position
US Billboard Hot 100	25
US Hot R&B/Hip-Hop Songs (Billboard)	7
US Rhythmic Airplay (Billboard)	19

=== Year-end charts ===
Weekly chart performance for "Rain"
Chart (1998)	Peak position
US Hot R&B/Hip-Hop Songs (Billboard)	54
US Rhythmic (Billboard)	87
