= Youthful Praise =

- Origin: Bridgeport, Connecticut, U.S.
- Genres: Gospel, urban gospel
- Occupation: Singer
- Instrument: Vocals
- Years active: 2001–present
- Label: Evidence Gospel/Light
- Website: youthfulpraise.org

Youthful Praise is an American gospel choir led by James "J.J." Hairston who directs the choir and composes most of their material.

== Biography ==
Youthful Praise originated at the Bridgeport, Connecticut, church Turner's Faith Temple. The outfit was originally known as Teens of TFT. They released their first album Awesome God in 2001 with Evidence Gospel, a division of online news magazine GospelFlava.com. The title track became popular with church choirs and helped make their debut album a success. The album earned Youthful Praise two Stellar Award nomination in 2003 for Choir of the Year and Contemporary Choir of the Year. The group was also nominated for a Soul Train Award for Gospel Artist of the Year, and the GMWA Excellence Award for Choir of the Year.

The group's sophomore release Thank You for the Change raised their profile even more by featuring a guest vocal performance from Coko, former lead singer of SWV on "Up There" and containing the highlight song "Deliver". YP matured their sound even more on the next release Live! The Praise... The Worship which delivered the hit singles like "Incredible God, Incredible Praise" and "You Are So Awesome".

Youthful Praise continued expanding their borders with television appearances on Late Night with Conan O'Brien, The Stellar Awards, and Bobby Jones Gospel. The ensemble was soon invited to perform with Joan Osborne, Shirley Caesar, and Destiny's Child.

Exalted, an exciting collection recorded live in Baltimore, Maryland, was released on both CD/DVD in 2007. The following year saw a recap of their success with the compilation The Best of Youthful Praise. Their most recent album Resting On His Promise was released September 1, 2009, and features guest appearances from Pastor Shirley Caesar, Myron Butler, worship leader Steven Hurd, and Dorinda Clark Cole.

Founding member of Youthful Praise, Pastor Shawn M. Brown died unexpectedly on January 31, 2010. One of the original co-directors of YP, Brown was the songwriter behind the group's first hit "Awesome God". More recently, he formed the group Shawn Brown & Key of David and released an independent album in 2008.

YP's album After This was released in March 2012.

== Discography ==
- Awesome God (2001)
- Thank You for the Change (2004)
- Live! The Praise... The Worship (2005)
- Exalted (2007)
- The Best of Youthful Praise (2008)
- Resting on His Promise (2009)
- After This (2012)
- I See Victory (2014)
- You Deserve It (2017)
- Miracle Worker (2019)
- Not Holding Back (2021)
- Believe Again(2022)
- Believe Again, Vol. II(2023)
- Joy Is Here (2023)
