= You're the One (SWV song) =

1996 single by SWV

Single by SWV

from the album New Beginning
- Released: March 29, 1996
- Length: 4:43
- Label: RCA; BMG
- Songwriters: Ivan Matias; Allen Gordon Jr.; Cheryl Gamble; Tamara Johnson; Andrea Martin
- Producer: Allen "Allstar" Gordon Jr.

SWV singles chronology
"Anything (Old Skool Radio Version)" (1994)	"You're the One" (1996)	"Use Your Heart" (1996)

Music video
- "You're the One" on YouTube

"You're the One" is a song recorded by American female R&B vocal trio SWV for their second studio album, New Beginning (1996). RCA Records released the song on March 29, 1996, as the lead single from New Beginning. "You're the One" topped the US Billboard Hot R&B Singles chart and became a top-10 hit on the Billboard Hot 100 and in New Zealand, receiving gold certifications in both countries. A sample of this song can be heard in South Korean boy group EXO's song "Ya Ya Ya" from their seventh studio album, Obsession (2019).

== Critical reception ==
Larry Flick from Billboard magazine wrote, "New-jill-swingin' trio returns with a preview into its forthcoming New Beginning collection that is strong enough to fend off the dreaded sophomore slump. Playfully straddling the track's bouncy jeep/funk groove, "sisters" Cheryl Gamble, Tamara Johnson and Leanne Lyons harmonize with ample diva prowess. Best of all, the songs has a hook to please the most discerning pop listener. Dine on it over and over." Neil Kulkarni from Melody Maker called it a "beautiful futurist pop record (surprisingly weird, too, all phat chunkbeats and ghostly samples) that destroy the enemy in one sassy stilettoed strut."

== Chart performance ==
"You're the One" spent one week at number one on the US Billboard Hot R&B Singles chart, making it their third single to reach number one on that chart. Due to its high initial sales, along with sufficient airplay, it became a crossover success, debuting at number nine on the Billboard Hot 100 and peaking at number five, becoming their fourth and final top-10 hit. The single sold 900,000 copies domestically and was certified gold by the Recording Industry Association of America (RIAA). Worldwide, "You're the One" peaked at number 99 in Australia, number 53 in Canada, number 13 in the United Kingdom, and number six in New Zealand, where it earned a gold certification for sales of over 5,000 copies.

== Track listings ==
All versions of "'96 Anthem – You're the One" feature Lost Boyz, Trigger tha Gambler, and Smooth da Hustler. All versions of the D.J. Clark Kent remix feature Jay-Z. All versions of the Puff Daddy Bad Boy remix feature Busta Rhymes.

- US CD, 12-inch, and cassette single
- Australian and Japanese CD single
1. "You're the One" (LP version) – 4:39
2. "You're the One" (instrumental) – 4:44
3. "You're the One" (a cappella) – 4:40
- US and Canadian maxi-CD single (Remixes)
1. "'96 Anthem – You're the One" (Allstar remix with rap) – 4:58
2. "You're the One" (D.J. Clark Kent remix with rap) – 4:39
3. "You're the One" (Puff Daddy Bad Boy remix with rap) – 4:38
4. "You're the One" (KO remix) – 4:33
5. "You're the One" (LP version) – 4:39
- US 12-inch single (Remixes)

A1. "'96 Anthem – You're the One" (Allstar remix with rap) – 4:58
A2. "You're the One" (D.J. Clark Kent remix with rap) – 4:39
A3. "You're the One" (LP version) – 4:39
B1. "You're the One" (Puff Daddy Bad Boy remix with rap) – 4:38
B2. "You're the One" (KO remix) – 4:33
B3. "You're the One" (Soul 360 remix) – 4:17

- US cassette single (Remixes)

A1. "'96 Anthem – You're the One" (Allstar remix with rap) – 4:58
A2. "You're the One" (D.J. Clark Kent remix with rap) – 4:39
B1. "You're the One" (Puff Daddy Bad Boy remix with rap) – 4:38

- UK CD single
1. "You're the One" (radio edit) – 3:49
2. "'96 Anthem – You're the One" (Allstar remix with rap) – 4:22
3. "You're the One" (D.J. Clark Kent remix with rap) – 5:38
4. "Right Here – Human Nature Duet" (Demolition 12-inch mix) – 4:58
- UK 12-inch single

A1. "'96 Anthem – You're the One" (Allstar remix with rap) – 4:22
A2. "'96 Anthem – You're the One" (Allstar remix instrumental) – 4:22
A3. "You're the One" (radio edit) – 3:49
B1. "You're the One" (D.J. Clark Kent remix with rap) – 5:38
B2. "You're the One" (SWV dub mix) – 5:29
B3. "You're the One" (Soul 360 guitar remix) – 4:17

- European CD single
1. "You're the One" (LP version) – 4:39
2. "You're the One" (instrumental) – 4:44

== Charts ==
=== Weekly charts ===
Chart (1996)	Peak position
Australia (ARIA)	99
Canada Top Singles (RPM)	53
Canada Adult Contemporary (RPM)	36
Canada Dance/Urban (RPM)	3
Europe (Eurochart Hot 100)	45
Europe (European Dance Radio)	13
Israel (Israeli Singles Chart)	26
New Zealand (Recorded Music NZ)	6
Scottish Singles Sales (Official Charts)	55
UK Singles (Official Charts)	13
UK Dance (Official Charts)	6
UK Hip Hop/R&B (Official Charts)	3
US Billboard Hot 100	5
US Dance Singles Sales (Billboard)	2
US Hot R&B/Hip-Hop Songs (Billboard)	1
US Pop Airplay (Billboard)	34
US Rhythmic Airplay (Billboard)	3

=== Year-end charts ===
Chart (1996)	Position
Canada Dance/Urban (RPM)	42
New Zealand (RIANZ)	49
US Billboard Hot 100	36
US Hot R&B Singles (Billboard)	17
US Maxi-Singles Sales (Billboard)	14
US Top 40/Rhythm-Crossover (Billboard)	18

== Certifications ==
Region	Certification	Certified units/sales
New Zealand (RMNZ)	Gold	5,000^{*}
United States (RIAA)	Gold	900,000
^{*} Sales figures based on certification alone.

== Release history ==
Region	Date	Format(s)	Label(s)	Ref.
United States	March 19, 1996	Rhythmic contemporary radio	RCA; BMG	
United States	March 26, 1996	Contemporary hit radio	RCA; BMG	
United States	March 29, 1996	12-inch vinyl; CD; cassette	RCA; BMG	
Japan	May 22, 1996	CD	RCA	

== See also ==
- R&B number-one hits of 1996 (USA)
