= Grateful (Coko album) =

Studio album by Coko
- Released: October 31, 2006
- Length: 53:17
- Label: Light

Coko chronology
Hot Coko (1999)	Grateful (2006)	A Coko Christmas (2008)

Grateful is the second studio album by American R&B singer Coko. It was released by Light Records on October 31, 2006. At the 50th Grammy Awards, Coko was nominated for the Grammy Award for Best Contemporary R&B Gospel Album, but lost to Fred Hammond for Free to Worship.

== Track listing ==
No.	Title	Writer(s)	Producer(s)	Length
1.	"Look at Me"	Walter Hawkins	Arthur "Buddy" Strong; "Big Mike" Clemons	6:10
2.	"Mighty God" (featuring Lady Tibba)	Donald Lawrence	Lawrence	4:50
3.	"Grateful"	Joi Campbell; Warryn Campbell	W. Campbell	3:24
4.	"Clap Your Hands"	Nakeia Homer; Charles "Tony" Homer	Homer	3:15
5.	"Endow Me" (featuring Faith Evans, Fantasia & Lil' Mo)	Twinkie Clark	Asaph Alexander Ward	6:57
6.	"The Reason"	W. Campbell	W. Campbell	3:16
7.	"I Get Joy"	Shep Crawford; Charles Stepney; Maurice White; Philip Bailey	Da Wax; Shep Crawford	4:10
8.	"Holy"	Lawrence	Lawrence	4:29
9.	"I Promise"	J. Campbell; W. Campbell	W. Campbell	3:42
10.	"Please Don't Forget"	Shalonda Crawford; Shep Crawford	Shep Crawford	3:29
11.	"Hymn Medley" ("Just As I Am"/"Lamb of God"/"Thank You Lord")	Twila Paris; Bessie Sykes; Seth Sykes	Strong; Clemons	6:05
12.	"Please Don't Forget (Remix)"	Shalonda Crawford; Shep Crawford	Shep Crawford	3:30

Bonus tracks
No.	Title	Writer(s)	Producer(s)	Length
13.	"Midnite"	Brent Jones	Ward	3:42
14.	"I Wish"	Charmelle Cofield; Shep Crawford	Shep Crawford	3:19

== Charts ==
Chart (2006)	Peak position
US Top Gospel Albums (Billboard)	5
US Independent Albums (Billboard)	21
US Top R&B/Hip-Hop Albums (Billboard)	40
