= Co-Sign (song) =

Single by SWV

from the album I Missed Us
- Released: December 15, 2011 (digital); January 10, 2012 (radio)
- Recorded: 2011
- Genre: R&B; hip-hop soul
- Length: 3:48
- Label: Mass Appeal; E1
- Songwriters: Cainon Lamb, Taurian Osborn
- Producer: Lamb

SWV singles chronology
"Rain" (1997)	"Co-Sign" (2011)	"Ain't No Man" (2015)

"Co-Sign" is a song by American R&B group SWV, released on December 15, 2011, by Mass Appeal Entertainment and E1 Music. The song is the first single for the group since 1998's "Rain" and was intended to launch their mainstream comeback. A music video for the single was filmed in Atlanta on January 25, 2012, and was officially released February 21, 2012 on AOL Music's TheBoomBox.com. It is the first single from SWV's comeback album I Missed Us.

== Charts ==
Chart (2012)	Peak position
Japan (Japan Hot 100)	86
US Hot R&B/Hip-Hop Songs	48
