= It's All About U =

1996 single by SWV

Single by SWV

from the album New Beginning
- Released: October 29, 1996
- Length: 3:43
- Label: RCA
- Songwriters: Allen "Allstar" Gordon; Andrea Martin; Anthony Burroughs
- Producer: Allen "Allstar" Gordon

SWV singles chronology
"Use Your Heart" (1996)	"It's All About U" (1996)	"Can We" (1997)

"It's All About U" is a song by SWV, released on October 29, 1996, as the third single from their second album, New Beginning (1996). The song was written by Allen "Allstar" Gordon, Andrea Martin, and Anthony Burroughs, and it was produced by Gordon.

== Critical reception ==
A reviewer from Music Week rated the song three out of five, adding, "Sounding at times like a mid-Sixties Smokey Robinson given a Nineties swingbeat feel, this attractively combines a raw, funky production with soulful vocals."

== Music video ==
The song's music video was filmed at the Museum of Science and Industry in Tampa, Florida, and was directed by Kevin Bray.

== Track listings ==
US single

1. It's All About U (LP version)
2. It's All About U (instrumental)
3. It's All About U (a cappella)

UK CD 1

1. It's All About U (radio edit)
2. It's All About U (Bounce Baby Bounce remix)
3. It's All About U (All Funked Up remix)
4. Anything (Old Skool radio version)

UK CD 2

1. It's All About U (radio edit)
2. Use Your Heart (Rappers Delight remix)
3. Use Your Heart (duet featuring Rome)
4. You're the One (Special Mix with hook & rappers from the remixes)

UK Cassette

1. It's All About U (Radio Edit)
2. You're the One (Special Mix with hook & rappers from the remixes)

Europe CD

1. It's All About U (LP version)
2. It's All About U (Fast Car mix)
3. It's All About U (Allstar mix)
4. It's All About U (Drumapella)

== Charts ==
Charts (1996)	Peak position
Australia (ARIA)	169
New Zealand (Recorded Music NZ)	46
Scotland Singles (OCC)	94
UK Singles (OCC)	36
UK Hip Hop/R&B (OCC)	13
US Billboard Hot 100	61
US Dance Singles Sales (Billboard)	35
US Hot R&B/Hip-Hop Songs (Billboard)	32
US Rhythmic Airplay (Billboard)	30

== Release history ==
Region	Date	Format	Label	Ref.
United States	October 29, 1996	Rhythmic contemporary radio	RCA	
United States	November 12, 1996	Contemporary hit radio	RCA	
United Kingdom	December 9, 1996	CD; cassette	RCA; BMG	
United States	December 30, 1996	CD	RCA	
