= Lose My Cool =

1997 single by SWV

Single by SWV featuring Redman

from the album Release Some Tension
- Released: September 16, 1997
- Genre: R&B
- Length: 4:05
- Label: RCA
- Songwriters: C. Pendleton; Reggie Noble
- Producers: Malik Pendleton; Mary Brown

SWV singles chronology
"Someone" (1997)	"Lose My Cool" (1997)	"Rain" (1998)

Redman singles chronology
"Smoke Buddah" (1997)	"Lose My Cool" (1997)	"4, 3, 2, 1" (1997)

"Lose My Cool" is a song by American R&B group SWV featuring rapper Redman, released as the third single from SWV's third studio album, Release Some Tension. It was unable to chart on the US Billboard Hot R&B Singles chart due to rules in place at the time regarding album cuts, but it appeared on the Billboard Hot R&B Airplay chart, peaking at number 31.

== Music video ==
An accompanying music video was released, directed by Wu-Tang Clan and Chase Johnston-Lynch.

== Track listings ==
US CD

1. Lose My Cool (Radio Edit) 4:00
2. Lose My Cool (LP Version) 4:38
3. Lose My Cool (Instrumental) 4:24
4. Lose My Cool (A Cappella) 4:36

US 12-inch vinyl

1. Lose My Cool (Radio Edit) 4:00
2. Lose My Cool (LP Version) 4:38
3. Lose My Cool (No Rap Intro) 4:00
4. Lose My Cool (Instrumental) 4:24
5. Lose My Cool (A Cappella) 4:36
6. Lose My Cool (No Rap Version) 4:30

UK CD

1. Lose My Cool (Radio Edit) 4:00
2. Someone (LP Version) 4:05
3. Someone (Instrumental) 4:55
4. Someone (A Cappella) 4:52

== Charts ==
Charts (1997)	Peak position
US R&B/Hip-Hop Airplay (Billboard)	31
