= Use Your Heart =

1996 single by SWV

Single by SWV

from the album New Beginning
- Released: July 23, 1996
- Genre: R&B
- Length: 4:50 (album version); 3:58 (radio edit)
- Label: RCA
- Songwriters: Pharrell Williams; Charles Hugo
- Producer: The Neptunes

SWV singles chronology
| "You're the One" (1996) | "Use Your Heart" (1996) | "It's All About U" (1996) |

"Use Your Heart" is a song by American R&B trio SWV, released on July 23, 1996, by RCA Records, as the second single from their second album, New Beginning (1996). Written and produced by Pharrell Williams and Chad Hugo, it was the first song produced by the duo (as The Neptunes) to chart on the US Billboard Hot 100. In 2024, the song gained further prominence after it was sampled by Kendrick Lamar on the track "Heart Pt. 6" from his sixth studio album, GNX.

== Production and release ==
The song was written and produced by the Neptunes duo Pharrell Williams and Chad Hugo. The track was the second single on the album New Beginning. The song was released on July 23, 1996, by RCA Records.

== Critical reception ==
Larry Flick from Billboard magazine described the song as an "sumtuous old-school soul swinger that will have listeners lost in memories of their favorite '70s moments." He added, "These sisters now have the chops to support their bid to become R&B's leading female vocal group. They kick it lovely while Pharrell Williams and Chad Hugo surround their plush harmonies with fluttering horns and even-handed funk guitar licks. Yummy stuff that belongs at the top of every urban playlist." HotNewHipHop put the song on their list of best SWV songs. Okayplayer praised the song for its mature themes, beat, and blend of the trio's voices. The track became the Neptunes' first track to chart on the Billboard Hot 100.

== Legacy ==
In 2024, American rapper Kendrick Lamar sampled the song on his track "Heart Pt. 6" from his sixth studio album GNX. In response to the sample, SWV member Lelee Lyons said that it would be "a treat" to perform with Kendrick at his Super Bowl LIX halftime show.

== Track listing ==
- Maxi-single
1. "Use Your Heart" (LP version)
2. "Use Your Heart" (edit)
3. "Use Your Heart" (CDS version)
4. "Use Your Heart" feat. Grampa & Boneyman (Rappers Delight remix)
5. "Use Your Heart" (acapella)
6. "Use Your Heart" (instrumental)

== Charts ==
=== Weekly charts ===
| Chart (1996) | Peak position |
|---|---|
| US Billboard Hot 100 | 22 |
| US Dance Singles Sales (Billboard) | 48 |
| US Hot R&B/Hip-Hop Songs (Billboard) | 6 |
| US Rhythmic Airplay (Billboard) | 19 |

=== Year-end charts ===
| Chart (1996) | Position |
|---|---|
| US Hot R&B Singles (Billboard) | 43 |
| US Top 40/Rhythm-Crossover (Billboard) | 83 |

== Release history ==
| Region | Date | Format(s) | Label | Ref. |
|---|---|---|---|---|
| United States | July 23, 1996 | Contemporary hit radio; rhythmic contemporary radio | RCA | |
| United States | July 28, 1996 | Cassette; CD | RCA | |
