= Release Some Tension =

Studio album by SWV
- Released: August 12, 1997
- Recorded: 1996–1997
- Genres: R&B; soul; pop; hip-hop soul
- Length: 53:15
- Label: RCA
- Producers: Sean "Puffy" Combs; Roderick "Majesty" Wiggins; Malik Pendleton; The Characters; Timbaland; Brian Alexander Morgan; Deric "D-Dot" Angelettie; Marc Kinchen; K. Perez; A.O Perez

SWV chronology
New Beginning (1996)	Release Some Tension (1997)	A Special Christmas (1997)

Singles from Release Some Tension
- 1. "Can We" Released: February 11, 1997; 2. "Someone" Released: June 24, 1997; 3. "Lose My Cool" Released: September 16, 1997; 4. "Rain" Released: February 24, 1998

Release Some Tension is the third studio album by American R&B vocal group SWV. It was released by RCA Records on August 12, 1997. The album guest appearances by E-40, Puff Daddy, Missy Elliott, Timbaland, Foxy Brown, Lil' Cease, Lil' Kim, Snoop Dogg and Redman. The album was certified gold by the Recording Industry Association of America (RIAA) for shipments exceeding 500,000 copies in the United States.

The album features hits like "Rain", "Someone", and "Can We". Another single "Lose My Cool" was slated to be released as the album's third single but due to limited radio airplay it was shelved in favor of "Rain" which became one of their most notable hits. The second single "Someone" reached number 19 on the Billboard charts and was certified gold by the RIAA for sales of 500,000 copies.

The album ultimately proved a commercial disappointment; with their future prospects uncertain, SWV would disband before the end of the year. The girls and others later claimed that the production of Release Some Tension had been unfairly rushed by SWV's label and that the girls had been forced to start recording while still in the middle of promoting their second album New Beginning (1996).

== Background ==
By the late 1990s, as the R&B landscape became increasingly shaped by artists and acts such as 112, Dru Hill, Blackstreet, Jodeci, Mary J. Blige, Toni Braxton, Usher, Brandy, Monica and Aaliyah, all of whom had a much raunchier and forceful edge to their music, SWV found it increasingly difficult to stay relevant with their old school gospel-influenced style. In an attempt to modernize SWV's image and sound, the group and their label enlisted a broader range of collaborators for their third album. The project ultimately featured a notable roster of guest appearances, including Puff Daddy, Foxy Brown, Redman, Timbaland, Lil' Kim, and Snoop Dogg.

In later reflections, Leanne "Lelee" Lyons voiced strong dissatisfaction with the album's visual presentation and overall artistic direction. She stated that she "hated that album," characterizing it as "ridiculous" and attributing its perceived shortcomings to "poor judgment." Lyons clarified, however, that her criticism was not aimed at the various artists featured on the record. Rather, she felt that the final product came across as "those great artists featuring SWV," and that all it did was make SWV look hopelessly out of touch to their core audience and unable to keep up with changing trends.

== Critical reception ==
Professional ratings
Review scores
Source	Rating
AllMusic	3/5 stars
Entertainment Weekly	B+
The Guardian	3/5 stars
Los Angeles Times	3/4 stars
Music Week	4/5 stars
NME	3/10
Rolling Stone	3/5 stars
USA Today	3/4 stars

Release Some Tension received mixed reviews, praised for its funky singles and vocals but criticized for being overshadowed by guest collaborators. Writing for The Los Angeles Times, Cheo Hodari Coker called the album "the trio's most consistently pleasing album yet" and a "highly effective mix of hip-hop sass, sexual bravado and occasional sentimental yearning." AllMusic senior editor Stephen Thomas Erlewine wrote that although the album occasionally finds the group overshadowed by its many high-profile collaborators, it was nevertheless a "solid" effort, particularly when propelled by its "funky singles." He observed that the trio aimed to break free from the "slick urban straitjacket" of their earlier work and return to their hip-hop roots, enlisting an extensive roster of producers to achieve that goal. Entertainment Weekly critic Cheo Tyehimba noted that the album "finds the sistas lifting their voices with rollicking dexterity and torchy soul," describing it as a return to the sound that earned them multi-platinum success. He added that guest appearances by Combs, Elliott, and Redman infuse the record with street credibility and pop energy.

Music Week characterized Release Some Tension as “smooth, but pleasingly scuffed around the edges," calling it "an album full of singles." Writing for NME, Johnny Dee was more critical, arguing that SWV’s recruitment of a “gaggle of hip-hop stars" makes the album only "marginally more interesting than a stale digestive biscuit." He ultimately described Release Some Tension as "very, very dull," suggesting that its cool, steady tone seems intentionally understated. Rolling Stone's Natasha Stovall concluded on a mixed note, asserting that while SWV's "diva croons and tight, soul-heavy harmonies" elevate certain tracks, even the album's ultra-produced hip-hop jams remain rooted in the group's enduring preoccupation with romance. Billboard concluded that Release Some Tension "takes it back to the street with gritty, infectious R&B tracks and performances. Project is highlighted by satisfying funky loops and star-power vocals by guest performers." USA Today critic Steve Jones wrote that Release Some Tension aimed to help listeners "get your groove on in more ways than one," combining danceable jams with "steamy sentiments."

=== Accolades ===
Nominations for Release Some Tension
Organization	Year	Award	Result	Ref.
Soul Train Lady of Soul Awards	1998	R&B/Soul Album of the Year – Group, Band or Duo	Nominated	

== Commercial performance ==
Upon its release in August 1997, Release Some Tension achieved moderate commercial success across several international markets, though its overall performance was noticeably weaker than that of the group's two preceding albums. In the United States, it peaked at number five on the Top R&B/Hip-Hop Albums chart and number twenty-four on the Billboard 200. It became the group's first studio album to miss the top ten of the latter chart. Nevertheless, the album was certified Gold by the Recording Industry Association of America (RIAA) for shipments of 500,000 units. In Canada, it reached number 19 on the Canadian Albums Chart and was subsequently certified Gold by Music Canada for shipments of 50,000 units.

In the United Kingdom, the album rose to number three on the UK R&B Albums Chart and peaked at number nineteen on the UK Albums Chart. In continental Europe, it attained number eighteen on the Dutch Albums Chart, number twenty-three on the Swedish Albums Chart, and number 65 on the German Albums Chart, marking SWV's highest-charting album in the latter territories. In Asia, Release Some Tension received a Gold certification from the Recording Industry Association of Japan (RIAJ) for shipments of 100,000 units.

== Track listing ==
Release Some Tension track listing
No.	Title	Writer(s)	Producer(s)	Length
1.	"Someone" (featuring Puff Daddy)	Deric "D-Dot" Angelettie; Sean Combs; Jeremy A. Graham; Andrea Martin; Harve Pierre; Kelly Price; Todd Shaw	J Dub; Combs	4:05
2.	"Release Some Tension" (featuring Foxy Brown)	Missy "Midemeanor" Elliott; Inga Marchand; John Daniels; Roderick Wiggins	Wiggins; Daniels^{[a]}	4:05
3.	"Lose My Cool" (featuring Redman)	Malik Pendleton; Reginald Noble	Pendleton	4:38
4.	"Love Like This" (featuring Lil' Cease)	Charles Farrar; Kendall Jones; Troy Taylor; Jeff Lorber	Taylor	3:46
5.	"Can We" (featuring Missy Elliott)	Elliott; Timothy Mosley	Timbaland	4:51
6.	"Rain"	Brian Alexander Morgan; Jaco Pastorius	Morgan	4:25
7.	"Give It Up" (featuring Lil' Kim)	Angelettie; Price; Kimberly Jones; Darryl French; Mark James	D-Dot; Lanz "Wet" Mitchell	4:41
8.	"Come and Get Some" (featuring E-40)	Cheryl Gamble; Earl Stevens; Marc Kinchen	Kinchen	4:23
9.	"When U Cry"	Darryl Ellis; Paul Richmond; Ruben Locke Jr.; Patricia Deige Muldrow; Kevin Perez; Tony Pérez	K. Perez; T. Perez	4:31
10.	"Lose Myself"	Farrar; Dawn Beckman; Taylor	Taylor	4:38
11.	"Here For You"	Farrar; Johntá Austin; Kevin Evans; Taylor	Taylor	4:53
12.	"Gettin' Funky" (featuring Snoop Doggy Dogg)	Calvin Broadus; Leon Sylvers III	Kinchen; Evans	4:19
Total length:				53:15

Notes

- ^{^[a]} signifies a co-producer

Sample credits

- "Someone" embodies portions of "Ten Crack Commandments" as performed by The Notorious B.I.G.
- "Release Some Tension" embodies portions of "Collage" as written by E. Green.
- "Love Like This" embodies portions of "Raindance" as written and performed by Jeff Lorber.
- "Give It Up" contains samples of "No Tricks" as performed by The 45 King.
- "Gettin' Funky" contains samples of "Misdemeanor" as performed by Foster Sylvers.

== Charts ==
=== Weekly charts ===
Weekly chart performance for Release Some Tension
Chart (1997)	Peak position
Australian Albums (ARIA)	195
Canada Top Albums/CDs (RPM)	19
Canadian R&B Albums (SoundScan)	3
Dutch Albums (Album Top 100)	18
European Top 100 Albums (Music & Media)	38
German Albums (Offizielle Top 100)	65
Swedish Albums (Sverigetopplistan)	23
UK Albums (Official Charts)	19
UK R&B Albums (Official Charts)	3
US Billboard 200	24
US Top R&B/Hip-Hop Albums (Billboard)	5

=== Year-end charts ===
Year-end chart performance for Release Some Tension
Chart (1997)	Position
US Top R&B/Hip-Hop Albums (Billboard)	89

== Certifications ==
Certifications for Release Some Tension
Region	Certification	Certified units/sales
Canada (Music Canada)	Gold	50,000^{^}
Japan (RIAJ)	Gold	100,000^{^}
United States (RIAA)	Gold	500,000^{^}
^{^} Shipments figures based on certification alone.
