= SWV =

American R&B vocal group

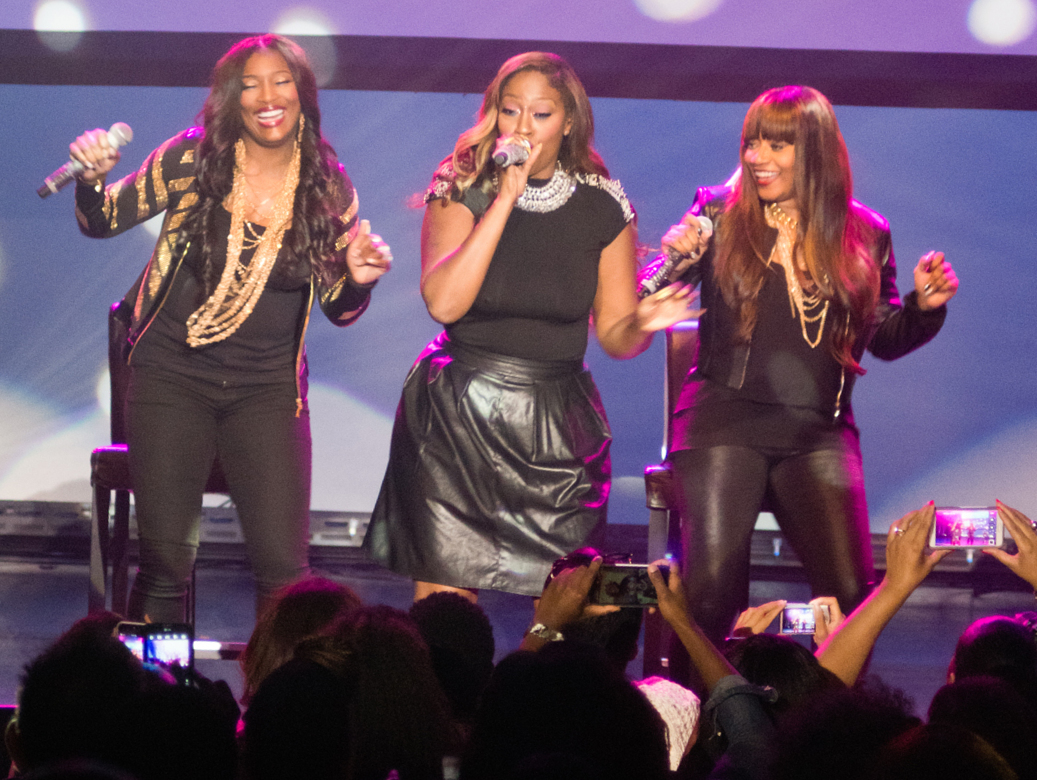
- Left to right: Taj, Coko and Lelee performing in 2014

Background information
- Also known as: Sisters with Voices
- Origin: New York City, U.S.
- Genres: R&B; new jack swing; soul; hip hop; hip hop soul
- Years active: 1988–1998; 2005–present
- Labels: RCA; Mass Appeal Entertainment/E1 Music
- Members: Cheryl "Coko" Gamble; Tamara "Taj" George; Leanne "Lelee" Lyons
- Website: swvmusic.com

SWV (Sisters with Voices) is an American R&B vocal trio from New York City whose members are Cheryl "Coko" Gamble, Tamara "Taj" George, and Leanne "Lelee" Lyons. Formed in 1988 as a gospel group, SWV became one of the most successful R&B groups of the 1990s. They had a series of hits, including the Billboard Hot 100 number-one single "Weak", as well as the top-ten songs "Right Here (Human Nature Remix)", "I'm So into You", and "You're the One". The group disbanded in 1998 to pursue solo projects and reunited in 2005. As of 2023, SWV has sold over 5.4 million albums worldwide, and a further 6.5 million singles in the United States.

== Biography ==
=== 1988–1991: Early career and big break ===
SWV was formed by founding members Cheryl "Coko" Gamble and Leanne "Lelee" Lyons, with Gamble later recruiting Tamara "Taj" Johnson to join the group along with a fourth member named Samantha, who would eventually leave for unknown reasons. After getting their demo together, their manager at the time, Maureen Singleton sent out demo tapes along with bottles of Perrier ("We couldn't afford champagne", says Taj) to catch the attention of record execs all over America. In 1991, after being invited to sing live in front of RCA executives, SWV was signed to an eight-album record deal.

=== 1992–1995: It's About Time and The Remixes ===
It's About Time, the debut studio album by SWV, was released by RCA Records on October 27, 1992. It was certified multi-platinum by the RIAA for more than two million copies shipped to store. SWV's first single, "Right Here", was released in the fall of 1992, reaching No. 13 on the R&B charts. Their second single, "I'm So into You", peaked at No. 2 on R&B and reached No. 6 on the Billboard Hot 100. The third single, "Weak", reached No. 1 on both the R&B and Hot 100 charts. "Right Here/Human Nature", the fourth single and a remix of their first single, "Right Here", featured samples of Michael Jackson's hit "Human Nature". Pharrell Williams performed a small rap solo on "Right Here (UK Remix)". "Right Here/Human Nature" peaked at No. 1 on R&B and No. 2 on the Hot 100 and it stayed at No. 1 on the Billboard R&B charts for 7 weeks, making it one of the longest-running singles of 1993. It was followed up with the additional Top10 R&B hits, "Downtown" (No. 2), and "You're Always on My Mind" (No. 8). The album peaked at 8 on the US Billboard 200. Following the success of their first album, SWV appeared on the soundtrack for the 1994 film Above the Rim. The single, "Anything", became a top ten R&B hit and reached No. 18 on the Hot 100 in the spring of 1994. That same year, SWV released The Remixes, which went gold by the end of the year. In the summer of 1995, the trio lent vocal harmonies to Blackstreet's Top 40 R&B hit "Tonight's the Night". SWV also recorded the track, "All Night Long", which appeared on the Waiting to Exhale: Original Soundtrack Album in late 1995.

=== 1996–1997: New Beginning, Release Some Tension and A Special Christmas ===
Released on April 23, 1996, New Beginning was the second album from SWV. The first single, "You're the One", became one of their signature songs peaking at number five on the Billboard Hot 100 and topped the Hot R&B/Hip-Hop Singles chart. The second single, "Use Your Heart", saw the debut of the super producers The Neptunes. This song peaked at twenty-two on the Hot 100 and number six on the R&B chart. The last single, "It's All About U", found Taj taking most of the lead as opposed to Coko. The album was certified platinum for shipping 1,000,000 copies in the U.S. alone.

Release Some Tension is SWV's third album. It arrived on July 29, 1997. Guest appearances are made by E-40, Puff Daddy, Missy Elliott, Foxy Brown, Lil' Cease, Lil' Kim, Snoop Doggy Dogg, and Redman. The album features hits like "Rain" (which samples Jaco Pastorius's classic "Portrait of Tracy"), "Someone", "Can We" (which was originally included on the soundtrack for the Jamie Foxx film Booty Call), and canceled single "Lose My Cool". "Someone", although featuring one of the biggest producers/artists of the year, Puff Daddy, only reached No. 19 on the Billboard charts which sampled The Notorious B.I.G.'s "Ten Crack Commandment's and Les McCann's "Valantra". "When U Cry" also sampled Tyrone Davis' "In The Mood". The album was certified gold for shipping 500,000 copies in the U.S. alone. A Special Christmas, a holiday album featuring both cover versions and original material, was released in the United States on November 18, 1997, by RCA Records. A Special Christmas would be the penultimate album the trio recorded together before they disbanded the following year.

=== 1998–2010: Hiatus and reuniting of SWV ===
The group split in 1998. Shortly after SWV disbanded, the members began leading their own careers. Coko went on to release her first solo album under RCA, titled Hot Coko, in August 1999. The first single, "Sunshine", which was dedicated to her son Jazz, reached the Top 40 position in the R&B charts that summer. However, neither the album nor the singles gathered the same mainstream success as Coko did with SWV. Coko began working on a second solo album titled Music Doll in early 2001, but RCA closed the black music division and the project was shelved. Since then, she has concentrated more on her family. She eventually married gospel producer and drummer for Israel and New Breed, Mike "Big Mike" Clemmons, the father of her second son, Jaylen. She currently resides in Virginia Beach, Virginia. In 2001, Coko and her mother, Lady "Clyde" Tibba Gamble, did a remake of the song "Tears in Heaven" (originally recorded by Eric Clapton) on the album Rhythm and Spirit: "Love Can Build a Bridge". The album featured other artists such as Jennifer Holliday, Patti LaBelle, and Tramaine Hawkins. Clemons sang on the Brent Jones & TP Mobb single "Midnite" in 2002. She also appeared on Youthful Praise's 2003 gospel album Thank You for the Change singing lead on "Up There".

Coko's full gospel solo debut, Grateful, was released in the United States on October 31, 2006 and debuted at No. 5 on Billboard's Top Independent albums chart. Grateful includes an all-star cover of The Clark Sisters' "Endow Me" which features R&B singers Faith Evans, Fantasia Barrino and Lil Mo. An alternate version, minus Faith Evans was performed on BET's Celebration of Gospel '07. A special edition of Grateful only available through Wal-Mart includes two bonus tracks "I Wish" and Brent Jones' "Midnite" featuring Coko on lead vocals. Coko was reported to have joined an all-black touring cast performing the critically acclaimed play The Vagina Monologues, along with Sherri Shepherd, Star Jones, Vanessa L. Williams, and others. Coko performed in Japan for the Billboard Live Tour. She sang some of her solo hits "Sunshine", "Clap Your Hands", and the SWV song "Right Here/Human Nature".

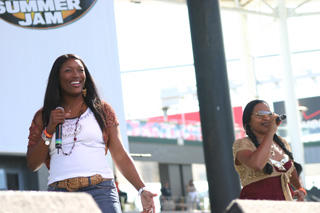
SWV members Taj and Lelee performing in 2005

In 2005, SWV reunited and announced plans to record a new album the following year, which did not materialize. In 2007, the group performed dates with After 7, Bobby Brown, New Edition, and Blackstreet. Also in 2007, Taj appeared in the TV One reality series I Married a Baller which documented her life with husband Eddie George, former NFL player and present Nashville entrepreneur. SWV members Coko and Lelee (who sing the theme song along with Taj) appear in a couple of the show's episodes. On June 24, 2008, during a performance by Alicia Keys at the BET Awards 2008, SWV made a special appearance with the original line up from En Vogue and TLC. SWV sang "Weak" with Alicia and later performed "Waterfalls" with the two other R&B girl groups. Taj was a contestant on Survivor: Tocantins, in which she came in fourth place. She was blindsided by her former alliance of J.T. Thomas and Stephen Fishbach. She became the sixth Jury Member. She participated in a 2009 national tour of The Vagina Monologues with an all-black cast, most of whom are also former reality show contestants. SWV appeared on The Mo'Nique Show on February 2, 2010, performing Patti LaBelle's "If Only You Knew". Lelee and Coko provided the lead vocals.

=== 2011–present: I Missed Us, reality show and Still ===
In 2011, SWV signed a record deal with Mass Appeal Entertainment and E1 Entertainment. On June 10, SWV was featured on the official remix of Chris Brown's remake of their "Right Here/Human Nature" song, "She Ain't You". SWV released "Co-Sign" on December 15, 2011, via iTunes as the first single from their fourth studio album, I Missed Us. VH1 ranked SWV No. 88 on their 100 Greatest: Women in Music list. Billboard named SWV the No. 7 R&B Act and the No. 2 Top Selling/Airplay R&B Female Group of the 1990s. The track listing for SWV's I Missed Us was released on Amazon.com. The album was released on April 17, 2012, via eOne Music and Mass Appeal Entertainment.

SWV appeared on the television talk show The Wendy Williams Show on April 17, 2012, to promote the release of I Missed Us and to perform the hit song "Co-Sign". The album then went to No. 1 on the iTunes R&B albums chart. On June 1, 2012, SWV announced that their next single from I Missed Us would be "Love Unconditionally". On June 28, 2012, the song "I'm So into You" from the triple-platinum album It's About Time was ranked at No. 18 on VH1's 40 Greatest R&B Songs of the '90s.

On November 4, 2012, SWV performed on Black Girls Rock!, an organization founded to inspire young black girls, on BET. On July 7, 2013, during the Essence Music Festival, SWV announced that We TV green-lit a reality series that would detail their lives as a group and individually, professionally and personally. It would also address their 1998 breakup and their subsequent reunion. SWV Reunited premiered on January 16, 2014, with a six-episode season. A twelve-episode second season followed later that August. As promised, the show has documented the trust issues the groupmates have with one another from their acrimonious split and their attempt to rebuild their friendships and their brand. It also showcased their professional endeavors and struggles, including touring and recording a comeback album, trying to get out of a record contract and disputes with their road manager, Cory Taylor. Subplots included Coko's reluctance to record secular music after her foray into gospel, Taj's health issues and Lelee's tumultuous relationship with her daughter. A song that the group was shown recording on SWV Reunited, titled "Ain't No Man", was released to iTunes as a promotional single on August 7, 2015.

On November 6, 2015, it was officially announced via Coko's official Instagram account that SWV Reunited had been canceled by WE tv. In the same post, she stated that SWV's long-delayed fifth studio album would be titled Still and was set to be released on February 5, 2016. On December 10, 2015, while making a surprise appearance on the television talk show, The View, Taj announced that "Still" was available for pre-order along with that came a second single titled "MCE (Man Crush Everyday)".

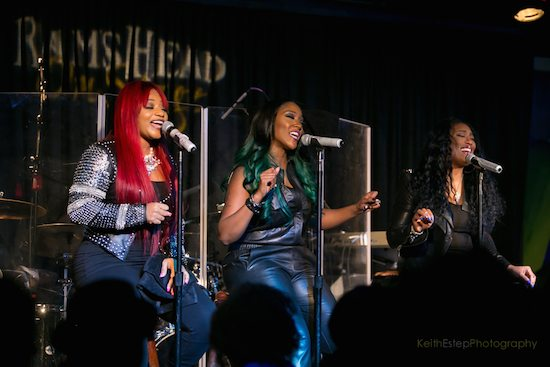
SWV performing in 2018

In 2017, SWV collaborated with Bell Biv DeVoe on the song "Finally" which was released as the second single off their album Three Stripes. They were also awarded the "Lady of Soul Award" at the 2017 Soul Train Music Awards.

In 2019, SWV announced they had partnered with hip-hop trio Salt-N-Pepa in the creation of a new reality series called Ladies Night. The show premiered on BET on April 30, 2019.

As part of their virtual artist battles birthed in 2020, Verzuz hosted a pre-Mother's day event, featuring both SWV and Xscape, on May 8, 2021. Both DJs, AONE and Spinderella, were responsible for music play for both groups.

== Members ==
- Cheryl "Coko" Gamble (born June 13, 1970, The Bronx, New York) is the Soprano and lead singer of the group, known for her distinctive high tone and vocal acrobatics. Coko lives in Virginia Beach. Her son is rapper Lil Tracy.
- Tamara "Taj" Johnson-George (born April 29, 1971, Brooklyn, New York) is the group's Mezzo-Soprano who has a more jazzy and blues sound. Taj lives in Nashville.
- Leanne "Lelee" Lyons (born July 17, 1973, The Bronx, New York) is also a Soprano and despite being the lightest voice of the three, sings the alto or lower parts. Lelee lives in Atlanta.

== Discography ==
Studio albums

- It's About Time (1992)
- New Beginning (1996)
- Release Some Tension (1997)
- A Special Christmas (1997)
- I Missed Us (2012)
- Still (2016)

== Tours ==
- Weak (1993 in the UK)
- Budweiser Superfest 1993 with BBD, Silk, Shai, MC Lyte & Intro in the US)
- SWV Live (1994 in the UK, South Africa, Canada, US)
- SWV World Tour (1996 in the US, Europe, South Africa, Asia, New Zealand)
- Release Some Tension (1998 in the US)
- New Jack Swing Tour (2005 in the US and Canada)
- Billboard Live Tour (June 16–21, 2008 in Japan)
- Billboard Live Tour (January 12–13, 2009 in Japan)
- SWV and Faith Evans (December 5–10, 2010 in the United Kingdom)
- Fresh Music Festival (May–July 2012, US)
- SWV Comeback Tour (2013 in London and US)
- Ladies Night Tour (With Salt-N-Pepa) (2018, US) Canceled
- Summer Block Party (with Jodeci and Dru Hill) (2023, US)
- Queens of R&B Tour (2024)

Opening Act

- 2017: Three Stripes Tour (for Bell Biv DeVoe with En Vogue)
- 2018: The Great Xscape Tour (for Xscape)
- 2019: As Long as I Live Tour (for Toni Braxton)

== Awards and nominations ==
Year	Result	Award	Category
1993	Nominated	American Music Awards	Favorite New Artist – Pop/Rock
1993	Nominated	American Music Awards	Favorite Band, Duo or Group – Soul/Rhythm & Blues
1993	Nominated	American Music Awards	Favorite Album – Soul/Rhythm & Blues for It's About Time
1993	Nominated	American Music Awards	Favorite New Artist – Soul / Rhythm & Blues
1993	Nominated	Kids Choice Awards	Female Group of the Decade
1993	Nominated	Billboard Music Awards	Top Hot 100 Single Artist – Duo/Group
1993	Nominated	Billboard Music Awards	Top R&B Artist – Duo/Group
1993	Nominated	Billboard Music Awards	Top R&B Single Artist – Duo/Group
1993	Nominated	Billboard Music Awards	Top Pop Artists – Duo/Group
1993	Nominated	Billboard Music Awards	Top New Pop Artist
1993	Nominated	Billboard Music Awards	Top Hot 100 Single Artist
1993	Nominated	Billboard Music Awards	Top Hot 100 Airplay Track for "Weak"
1993	Nominated	Billboard Music Awards	Top R&B Artist
1993	Nominated	Billboard Music Awards	Top New R&B Artist (Won)
1993	Nominated	Billboard Music Awards	Top R&B Album Artist – Duo/Group
1993	Nominated	Billboard Music Awards	Top R&B Single Artist
1994	Nominated	Billboard Music Awards	Top R&B Singles Artist – Duo/Group
1994	Nominated	Billboard Music Awards	Top R&B Artist – Duo/Group
1994	Nominated	Grammy Awards	Best New Artist
1998	Nominated	Soul Train Awards	Best Soul/R&B Single by a Group, Band or Duo
2012	Nominated	Soul Train Awards	Best Independent R&B/Soul Artist or Group
2013	Nominated	Grammy Awards	Best Traditional R&B Performance for "If Only You Knew"
2017	Won	Soul Train Awards	Soul Train Lady of Soul Award

== See also ==
- List of bestselling music artists
- Top Heatseekers
- List of artists who reached number one in the United States
- List of performers on Top of the Pops
- Girl group
