= Someone (SWV song) =

1997 single by SWV

Single by SWV featuring Puff Daddy

from the album Release Some Tension
- B-side: "Love Like This"
- Released: June 24, 1997
- Length: 4:05 (album version); 3:49 (single version)
- Label: RCA
- Songwriters: Harve "Joe Hooker" Pierre; Jeremy A. Graham; Kelly Price
- Producers: Jay Dub; Sean "Puffy" Combs

SWV singles chronology
"Can We" (1997)	"Someone" (1997)	"Lose My Cool" (1997)

Puff Daddy singles chronology
"I'll Be Missing You" (1997)	"Someone" (1997)	"Mo Money Mo Problems" (1997)

"Someone" is a song by American R&B group SWV, released as the second single from their third studio album Release Some Tension on June 24, 1997. It features a guest appearance from American rapper and producer Sean Combs. The song samples "Ten Crack Commandments" and "The World Is Filled..." both by The Notorious B.I.G. from his album Life After Death.

"Someone" peaked at number five on the US Billboard Hot R&B Singles chart and number 19 on the Billboard Hot 100, receiving a gold certification from the Recording Industry Association of America (RIAA). In Canada and New Zealand, the single reached number 28, and in the United Kingdom, it debuted at number 34; as of 2026, it is SWV's last charting single in all three countries.

== Music video ==
A music video was released for the single, shot in New York City and directed by Joseph Kahn.

== Track listings ==
US CD

1. Someone (LP version) – 4:05
2. Love Like This (LP version) – 3:46

UK CD

1. Someone (LP version) – 4:05
2. Someone (instrumental) – 4:55
3. Someone (a cappella) – 4:52
4. Right Here (Demolition mix) – 4:58

== Charts ==
=== Weekly charts ===
Chart (1997)	Peak position
Australia (ARIA)	146
Canada Top Singles (RPM)	28
Canada Dance/Urban (RPM)	9
Canada (Nielsen SoundScan)	16
Europe (Eurochart Hot 100)	97
New Zealand (Recorded Music NZ)	28
Scottish Singles Sales (Official Charts)	85
UK Singles (Official Charts)	34
UK Dance (Official Charts)	8
UK Hip Hop/R&B (Official Charts)	9
US Billboard Hot 100	19
US Dance Singles Sales (Billboard)	3
US Hot R&B/Hip-Hop Songs (Billboard)	5
US Rhythmic Airplay (Billboard)	35

=== Year-end charts ===
Chart (1997)	Position
UK Urban (Music Week)	3
US Billboard Hot 100	88
US Hot R&B Singles (Billboard)	45
US Maxi-Singles Sales (Billboard)	39

== Certifications ==
Region	Certification	Certified units/sales
United States (RIAA)	Gold	500,000^{^}
^{^} Shipments figures based on certification alone.

== Release history ==
Region	Date	Format(s)	Label(s)	Ref.
United States	June 24, 1997	Rhythmic contemporary radio; urban contemporary radio	RCA	
United States	July 3, 1997	CD	RCA	
Japan	September 3, 1997	CD	BMG Victor	
