= Can We =

1997 single by SWV

Single by SWV

from the album Release Some Tension and Booty Call: The Original Motion Picture Soundtrack
- Released: February 11, 1997
- Studio: Master Sound (Virginia Beach, Virginia)
- Length: 4:51 (album version); 4:19 (radio edit)
- Label: RCA; Jive
- Songwriters: Melissa Elliott; Timothy Mosley
- Producer: Timbaland

SWV singles chronology
"It's All About U" (1996)	"Can We" (1997)	"Someone" (1997)

Missy Elliott singles chronology
"Cold Rock a Party" (1996)	"Can We" (1997)	"The Rain (Supa Dupa Fly)" (1997)

Music video
- "Can We" on YouTube

"Can We" is a song by American R&B trio SWV featuring guest vocals from Missy Elliott and production by Timbaland. It heavily samples the intro of "Do the Funky Chicken" by Rufus Thomas. The song was eventually included on SWV's third album, Release Some Tension (1997), but was originally a hit earlier in the year when it was included on the soundtrack to the 1997 film, Booty Call.

"Can We" received major airplay on urban radio stations in the United States, topping the R&B/Hip-Hop Airplay chart for a week and peaking at #3 on the Rhythmic Airplay chart but was not released as a cassette or CD single domestically. However, because of a 12-inch vinyl single release, "Can We" was able to chart on Billboard Hot 100, reaching number 75. Outside the US, the song topped the New Zealand Singles Chart and peaked at number 18 on the UK Singles Chart.

== Music video ==
A music video for the single was directed by Jesse Vaughan and premiered on music video stations in February 1997. The synopsis of the video primarily focuses on SWV, dressed in cheetah-print attire, dancing in front of matching backgrounds with their love interests. Missy Elliott is also featured in the video, where she is seen dancing in a newspaper-covered background.

== Track listings ==
US and UK 12-inch single

A1. "Can We" (LP version) – 4:51
A2. "Can We" (instrumental) – 4:49
A3. "Can We" (a cappella) – 4:49
B1. "Can We" (radio edit No. 1) – 4:15
B2. "Can We" (radio edit No. 2) – 4:15
B3. "Can We" (no rap radio) – 3:56

UK and Australian CD single

1. "Can We" (radio edit No. 1) – 4:15
2. "Can We" (radio edit No. 2) – 4:15
3. "Can We" (no rap radio) – 3:56
4. "Can We" (LP version) – 4:51
5. "Can We" (instrumental) – 4:49
6. "Can We" (a cappella) – 4:49

UK cassette single

1. "Can We" (LP version) – 4:51
2. "Can We" (radio edit No. 1) – 4:15

== Charts ==
=== Weekly charts ===
Chart (1997)	Peak position
Australia (ARIA)	174
Europe (Eurochart Hot 100)	76
New Zealand (Recorded Music NZ)	1
Scottish Singles Sales (Official Charts)	67
UK Singles (Official Charts)	18
UK Dance (Official Charts)	8
UK Hip Hop/R&B (Official Charts)	5
US Billboard Hot 100	75
US Dance Singles Sales (Billboard)	26
US R&B/Hip-Hop Airplay (Billboard)	1
US Hot R&B/Hip-Hop Songs (Billboard)	31
US Rhythmic Airplay (Billboard)	3

=== Year-end charts ===
Chart (1997)	Position
New Zealand (RIANZ)	16
UK Urban (Music Week)	16
US Rhythmic Top 40 (Billboard)	14

== Certifications ==
Region	Certification	Certified units/sales
New Zealand (RMNZ)	Gold	5,000^{*}
^{*} Sales figures based on certification alone.
