= Ain't No Man (SWV song) =

Single by SWV

from the album Still
- Released: August 7, 2015
- Recorded: 2015
- Genre: R&B
- Length: 3:33
- Label: Entertainment One Music
- Songwriters: Derrick "Bigg D" Baker; Ayanna Howard; Cainon Lamb; Dennis Lambert; Brian Potter
- Producers: Bigg D, Lamb

SWV singles chronology
"Co-Sign" (2011)	"Ain't No Man" (2015)	"MCE (Man Crush Everyday)" (2015)

"Ain't No Man" is a song by American R&B group SWV taken from their fifth studio album "Still" (2016). The song was released digitally on August 7, 2015, through Entertainment One. The song was written by Derrick "Bigg D" Baker, Ayanna Howard, Cainon Lamb, Dennis Lambert and Brian Potter.

== Music video ==
The music video was released to SWV's VEVO account on October 3, 2015, and was directed by Derek Blanks.

== Commercial performance ==
On November 14, 2015, the song charted at number thirteen on the Billboard Adult R&B Songs chart

== Track listing ==
Digital download
No.	Title	Length
1.	"Ain't No Man"	3:33

== Charts ==
Chart (2015)	Peak position
US Adult R&B Songs	13

== Release history ==
Region	Date	Format	Label	Ref
Worldwide	August 7, 2015	Digital Download	Entertainment One Music	
