= A Special Christmas =

Studio album / Christmas album by SWV
- Released: November 18, 1997
- Genre: Christmas
- Length: 42:20
- Label: RCA
- Producer: Michael J. Powell; Rex Rideout; Phil Temple

SWV chronology
Release Some Tension (1997)	A Special Christmas (1997)	Greatest Hits (RCA) (1999)

A Special Christmas is the fourth studio album and first Christmas album released by American female R&B trio SWV that was released in the United States on November 18, 1997, by RCA Records. The album follows the release of their third album Release Some Tension (1997) which was released four months earlier. It is a holiday album featuring cover versions. A Special Christmas would be the penultimate album the trio recorded together before they disbanded in 1998.

== Critical reception ==
Professional ratings
Review scores
Source	Rating
AllMusic	3/5 stars
Entertainment Weekly	C−

Jose F. Promis, writing for Allmusic senior editor Stephen Thomas Erlewine write that "the endearing, sleek, soulful set finds the Sisters With Voices covering a sweet selection of holiday standards, and it differs from their previous albums because all three gals handle lead vocals [...] This album works because they treat the standards with respect and reverence, while still managing to put the SWV stamp on the recordings, and the sole new track is a highlight, instead of a bore, which many contemporary Christmas songs tend to be. A sweet, endearing, soulful set"

== Track listing ==
No.	Title	Writer(s)	Producer(s)	Length
1.	"Intro"			0:41
2.	"The Christmas Song (Chestnuts Roasting on an Open Fire)"	Robert Wells; Mel Tormé	Michael J. Powell	4:27
3.	"This Christmas"	Donny Hathaway; Nadine McKinnor	Powell	3:56
4.	"Have Yourself a Merry Little Christmas"	Hugh Martin; Ralph Blane	Powell	4:28
5.	"Christmas Ain't Christmas (Without the One You Love)"	Gamble and Huff	Powell	3:15
6.	"Give Love on Christmas Day"	Berry Gordy Jr.; Alphonzo Mizell	Powell	3:49
7.	"White Christmas"	Irving Berlin	Powell	3:33
8.	"Silent Night"	Franz Xaver Gruber; Joseph Mohr	Powell	5:00
9.	"Silver Bells"	Jay Livingston; Ray Evans	Phil Temple; Rex Rideout	5:34
10.	"O Holy Night"	Adolphe Adam; John Sullivan Dwight	Powell	3:30
11.	"My Favorite Things"	Rodgers and Hammerstein	Powell	4:07

== Charts ==
Chart (1997)	Peak position
US Top R&B/Hip-Hop Albums (Billboard)	85
