= Coko =

American singer (born 1970)

Cheryl "Coko" Gamble
- Also known as: Coko; Cheryl Clemons
- Born: Cheryl Elizabeth Gamble; June 13, 1970 (age 56); The Bronx, New York City, U.S.
- Genres: R&B; hip hop soul; soul; new jack swing; urban contemporary gospel
- Occupations: Singer; songwriter; record producer; actress; television personality
- Instrument: Vocals
- Years active: 1988–present
- Labels: RCA; Light/Artemis
- Member of: SWV
- Website: cokosplace.com
- Spouse: Mike "Big Mike" Clemons (m. 2003; div. 2018)
- Children: 2, including Lil Tracy

Cheryl Elizabeth Gamble (formerly Clemons; born June 13, 1970), known professionally as Coko, is an American singer-songwriter best known as the lead singer of the R&B vocal trio Sisters With Voices (SWV). Aside from her R&B career, Gamble also has a solo gospel career. As a member of SWV, Coko has sold over 5.4 million albums worldwide, a further 6.5 million singles in the United States, and is a four-time Grammy Award nominee.

== Early life ==
Cheryl Elizabeth Gamble was born in The Bronx, New York to gospel singer Mother Lady "Clyde" Tibba Gamble, Gamble was raised in the South Bronx section, Gamble also lived in Brooklyn before moving back to The Bronx. Gamble began singing at age 3.

== Career ==
She began her recording career as a choir member in Hezekiah Walker's Love Fellowship Crusade Choir.

=== Sisters With Voices (SWV) ===
From 1990 to 1998, Gamble sang with the platinum recording group, Sisters With Voices (SWV). Collectively the female trio released five albums - with their debut It's About Time (1992) selling over three million copies making SWV a big hit and earning the group numerous awards and accolades, including a nomination for the Grammy Award for Best New Artist at the 1994 Grammy Awards. After their 1997 Christmas album, SWV disbanded. To commemorate their tremendous success and huge contribution to the contemporary R&B genre in the early 1990s, six compilation albums were released compiling their best efforts. Gamble made the final decision to disband the group. In an interview, Gamble stated it was not a mutual decision, that many people tried to convince her to stay but it was inevitable. Gamble went on to say that she didn't feel appreciated, that there was no unity within the group and the communication was gone. Gamble did not speak to founding member Leanne "Lelee" Lyons for several years. SWV eventually reunited and released two albums in the 2010s.

=== Solo career ===
After SWV disbanded, Gamble went on to work with other artists such as Will Smith, most notably on his Grammy Award-winning hit single "Men in Black" from the blockbuster film of the same name (1997). Gamble went on to release her first solo album under RCA, titled Hot Coko, released in August 1999. The first single, "Sunshine," which was dedicated to her son Jazz, reached the Top 40 position in the R&B charts that summer. However, both the album and singles did not gather the same mainstream success as Gamble once did with SWV. Meanwhile, Gamble was working on a second solo album titled Music Doll in early 2001, but RCA closed the black music division and the project was shelved.

In 2001, Gamble and her Mother Lady "Clyde" Tibba Gamble did a remake of the song "Tears in Heaven" (originally recorded by Eric Clapton) on the album Rhythm and Spirit: "Love Can Build a Bridge". The album featured other artists such as Jennifer Holliday, Patti LaBelle, and Tramaine Hawkins. Gamble sang on the Brent Jones and the T. P. Mobb single "Midnight" in 2002. Gamble also appeared on Youthful Praise's 2003 gospel album Thank You for the Change singing lead on "Up There". Coko's full gospel solo debut, Grateful, was released in the United States on October 31, 2006 and debuted at #5 on Billboard's Top Independent albums chart. Grateful includes an all-star cover of The Clark Sisters' "Endow Me" which features R&B singers Faith Evans, Fantasia Barrino and Lil Mo. An alternate version, minus Faith Evans was performed on BET's Celebration of Gospel '07. A special edition of Grateful only available through Wal-Mart includes two bonus tracks "I Wish" and Brent Jones' "Midnite" featuring Gamble on lead vocals. Gamble was reported to have joined an all-black touring cast performing the critically acclaimed play The Vagina Monologues, along with Sherri Shepherd, Star Jones, Vanessa L. Williams, and others. In June 2008, Coko performed in Japan for the Billboard Live Tour. Gamble sang some of her solo hits "Sunshine", "Clap Your Hands", and the SWV song "Right Here/Human Nature".

=== Reuniting with SWV ===
Gamble reunited with SWV and performed during their first live performance in eight years in Los Angeles for urban radio station KKBT 100.3 "The Beat"'s Summerjam concert on August 20, 2005. They also appeared on the 2006 New Jack Reunion Tour. SWV was featured in the XXL where they discussed single releases from their debut album It's About Time. In the interview, Gamble mentioned that the group would no longer perform sexually-explicit songs such as "Downtown" and "Can We" anymore out of a new respect for her beliefs as a Christian. The group's final performance took place in Toronto in late June 2007. On April 4, 2008, Coko returned with SWV to perform some of their hits for the local DJ Kid Kutts' birthday. As SWV was in the midst of new shows for early 2011, Gamble posed for a shoot in Jackson, Mississippi with photographer Will Sterling. The photos were in fashionable gowns, set against the natural beauty of the Mississippi Delta.

== Personal life ==
Coko has a son, Jazz, with Digable Planets member Ishmael Butler. Jazz is better known by his professional name, Lil Tracy.

Gamble married gospel producer and drummer for Israel and New Breed, Mike "Big Mike" Clemons on October 19, 2003. They have a son, Jalen Clemons, who is also known as a singer under the stage name Jayye Michael. The couple divorced in 2018 after 15 years of marriage.

Gamble currently resides in Virginia Beach, Virginia. She is an honorary member of Zeta Phi Beta, inducted during the organization's International Grand Boule in Nashville, Tennessee on July 11, 2026.

== Discography ==
=== Studio albums ===
List of albums, with selected chart positions, sales figures and certifications
Title	Album details	Peak chart positions			
Title	Album details	US	US R&B	US Indie	US Gospel
Hot Coko	Released: August 10, 1999; Label: RCA Records	68	14	—	—
Grateful	Released: October 31, 2006; Label: Light Records, Artemis	—	40	21	5
A Coko Christmas	Released: October 14, 2008; Label: Light	—	—	—	—
The Winner in Me	Released: July 14, 2009; Label: Light, Intersound	—	55	38	4

=== Compilation albums ===
List of albums, with selected chart positions
Title	Album details	Peak chart positions
Title	Album details	US Gospel
Always Coko	Released: May 22, 2012; Label: E1 Music	44

=== Singles ===
Year	Single	Chart positions				Album
Year	Single	US Hot	US R&B	US Gospel	UK	Album
1997	"Men in Black" (with Will Smith)^{1}	—	1	—	1	Men in Black: The Album
1999	"Sunshine"	70	19	—	—	Hot Coko
1999	"Triflin'" (with Eve)	—	69	—	—	Hot Coko
2006	"I Get Joy" (with Kirk Franklin)	—	—	20	—	Grateful
2006	"Clap Your Hands"	—	—	—	—	Grateful
2006	"Endow Me" (with Fantasia, Faith Evans, and Lil' Mo)	—	—	—	—	Grateful
2009	"Wait" (featuring Youthful Praise)	—	—	—	—	The Winner in Me
2010	"The Winner in Me"	—	—	29	—	The Winner in Me
2014	"At Your Feet"	—	—	21	—	TBA

^{1}U.S. Airplay charts

=== Other performances ===
- LSG: "All the Times (featuring Faith Evans, Coko, & Missy Elliott)" (Elektra, 1997)
- Johnny Gill & Coko: "Fire and Desire" Booty Call Soundtrack (Jive, 1997)
- Jon B., Coko and Jay-Z: "Keep It Real" Hav Plenty soundtrack (Yab Yum, 550 Music, 1998)
- Coko, Missy Elliott: "He Be Back" Why Do Fools Fall In Love Soundtrack (Elektra, 1999)
- Tevin Campbell: "Everything You Are" (Qwest, 1999)
- "Got A Hold Over Me (Easy Lover)" Urban Renewal: The Songs of Phil Collins (Atlantic, 2001)
- Brent Jones and the T. P. Mobb: "Midnite" (EMI Gospel, 2002)
- Bishop Eric Mcdaniels "Somehow Someway" We Are Healed Butterfly (2003)
- Youthful Praise: "Up There" (Evidence Gospel, 2003)
- Onitsha: "My Life" (featuring Mary Mary and Deborah Cox) (Stillwaters Records, 2007)
- Case & Coko: "Face ro Face" Tyler Perry's Meet the Browns soundtrack (Atlanta Records, 2008)
- George Huff: "Destiny" featuring Tasha Collins George Huff (Koch Records, 2009)
- Keith Sweat: My Valentine (KDS Entertainment Inc & Entertainment One Us, 2011)
- Jeff Bradshaw "So Thankful" (Hidden Beach Records, 2012)
- Donald Lawrence: "Might God" (Quietwater Entertainment, 2013)
- MC Lyte featuring Faith Evans: "Last Time" Legend (Sunni Gyrl, 2015)
- Charles Butler & Trinity: "Bless Your Name" (Anointed Sound Records LLC, 2016)
- Travis Malloy: "World Go Round" (Malloy Entertainment, 2020)
- Charles Butler & Trinity: "By My Spirit" (Red Alliance Media/Fair Trade Services, 2020)
- Brian Dunlap & 1 Purpose: "Testimony" (D-Lap Productions/KingsBridge Ent LLC 2023)
- E Will Featuring K-Ci " Crazy For Your Love" (WeRockin Ent 2024)
